= List of compositions by Johann Sebastian Bach printed during his lifetime =

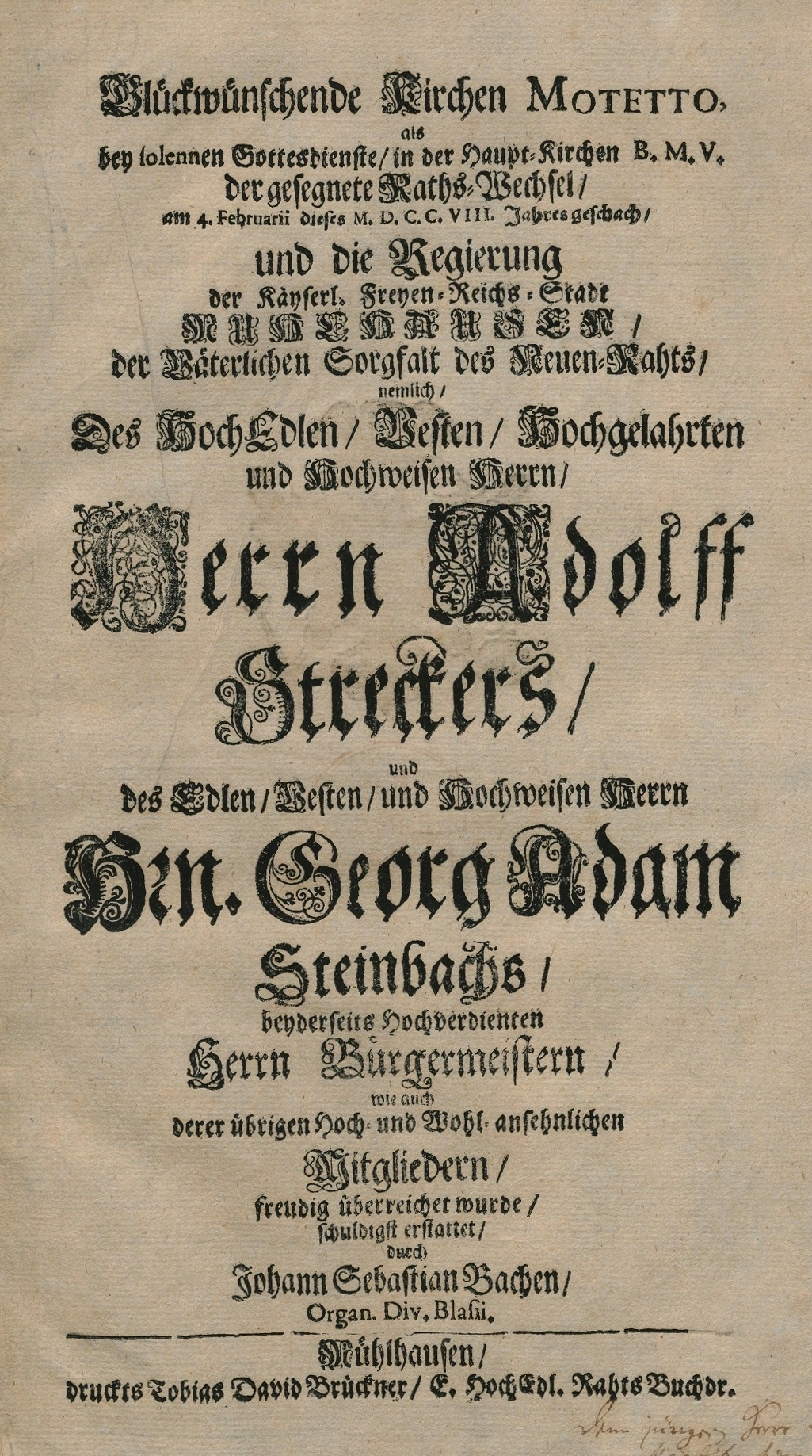
Title page of the oldest ascertained publication of a work by Bach: Gott ist mein König, BWV 71 (1708).

Compositions by Johann Sebastian Bach printed during his lifetime (1685–1750) include works for keyboard instruments, such as his Clavier-Übung volumes for harpsichord and for organ, and to a lesser extent ensemble music, such as the trio sonata of The Musical Offering, and vocal music, such as a cantata published early in his career. Other works, such as several canons, were printed without an indication by which instruments they were to be performed.

No more than a few works by Johann Sebastian Bach were printed during his lifetime. Extended works for choir and instrumentalists were not printed very often in his day. Bach selected mostly keyboard compositions for publication, which conformed to such contemporary practices, and was instrumental in establishing him as a keyboard composer. His works not only circulated in print: also manuscripts were copied and transmitted. Whether or not a work was selected for print was independent of the quality of the music.

== Context ==
Whereas earlier composers such as Palestrina, Monteverdi, Praetorius and Schütz had their works printed to ensure that the entire range of their music became more widely known, this was not the case with Bach. Bach only had a small proportion of his works printed. Christoph Wolff has suggested three reasons: firstly the financial support from municipal councils or noble patrons available to previous generations had diminished in Germany as a result of the Thirty Years War; secondly the expense of printing contrapuntal keyboard music which, at that time in Germany, was more often typeset than engraved; and lastly the low number of potential customers for works that were often technically difficult and unconventional.

Counting by BWV numbers, less than ten percent of the composer's output was printed during his lifetime. Especially the choral works, less than half a percent of over 400 BWV numbers, are under-represented. This was however not exceptional for Bach's time when larger works for chorus and orchestra were less often printed. Bach's own efforts to get his works printed concentrated mostly on his keyboard compositions, which contributed to the fact that, at least until the 19th-century Bach Revival, he was mainly regarded as a keyboard composer. Whether or not a work was selected for print was independent of the quality of the music.

Compositions by Johann Sebastian Bach printed during his lifetime
| BWV | Work | Print |
|---|---|---|
| 71 | Council election cantata Gott ist mein König | 1708 |
| 439–507 | songs and arias in Musicalisches Gesang-Buch | 1736 |
| 552 | Prelude and Fugue in E♭ for organ in Clavier-Übung III | 1739 |
| 645–650 | chorale preludes for organ (Schübler Chorales) | 1747–1748 |
| 669–689 | chorale preludes for organ in Clavier-Übung III | 1739 |
| 769 | Canonic Variations on "Vom Himmel hoch" for organ | 1747–1748 |
| 802–805 | duets for keyboard instrument in Clavier-Übung III | 1739 |
| 825–830 | partitas for harpsichord in Clavier-Übung I | 1726–1730, 1731 |
| 831 | French Overture for harpsichord in Clavier-Übung II | 1735 |
| 971 | Italian Concerto for harpsichord in Clavier-Übung II | 1735 |
| 988 | Goldberg Variations for harpsichord (Clavier-Übung IV) | 1741–1742 |
| 1074 | Canon a 4 | 1728, 1739, 1747 |
| 1076 | Canon triplex a 6 | 1747 |
| 1079 | The Musical Offering for diverse instruments | 1747–1749 |
| 1080 | The Art of Fugue | 1751, 1752 |
| 1138.1 | Council election cantata for Mühlhausen #2 (lost) | 1709 |
| 1138.2 | Council election cantata for Mühlhausen #3 (lost) | 1710 |

Most of the prints of Bach's music which appeared during his lifetime were commissioned by the composer. Bach's personal copies, often containing handwritten corrections or additions, have been recovered for several of his printed works. The German expression for personal copy, Handexemplar, also appears in English-language Bach-scholarship, and is used in the list below when referring to prints once contained in the personal library of Johann Sebastian Bach.

During Bach's lifetime his compositions were mostly distributed amongst his immediate musical associates through manuscript copies. After his death in 1750, manuscript copies of keyboard and vocal works were made by professional copyists and distributed by musical publishing firms, especially Breitkopf (Leipzig), Traeg (Vienna) and Westphal (Hamburg). This in turn led to the appearance of printed editions of his works, beginning with the publication of Bach's four-part chorales in the second half of the eighteenth century. The fact that Bach had published representative samples of his music for keyboard instruments contributed to his fame, and to an increased demand for such works after his death.

In his 1732 Musicalisches Lexicon, Johann Gottfried Walther listed all keyboard compositions by Johann Sebastian Bach which had been printed up to that point, that is, the six partitas of Clavier-Übung I. In Bach's obituary, which was published four years after the composer's death, printed and unprinted works are listed separately: the list of engraved compositions contains eight items, all of them instrumental works, and concludes with The Art of Fugue, which had been printed shortly after the composer's death. A comparable list, starting with the same eight items, appeared half a century later in Johann Nikolaus Forkel's Bach-biography. In 1937 Georg Kinsky published an extensive study of Bach's original publications.

== Printed music ==
The eight publications listed in Bach's obituary included The Art of Fugue which was in fact published shortly after the composer's death. Further, two publications with vocal music and two canons are extant.

=== Mühlhausen council election cantatas ===
Gott ist mein König, BWV 71, Bach's council election (Ratswahl) cantata composed for Mühlhausen in 1708, was printed that same year at the expense of the town council. Also in 1709 and 1710 Bach wrote the council election cantatas for Mühlhausen, which likewise would have been printed. These cantatas, BWV 1138.1 and 1138.2, are however lost: neither a print nor a manuscript survives.

Publication
The Mühlhausen council commissioned the publication of the Ratswahl cantatas. The parts and libretto of the Gott ist mein König cantata, printed in Mühlhausen in 1708, are extant.

Handexemplar
Mus. 11495 of the Berlin State Library, one of the surviving prints of the BWV 71 cantata, has a handwritten note by Bach on the front page.

=== Clavier-Übung I ===
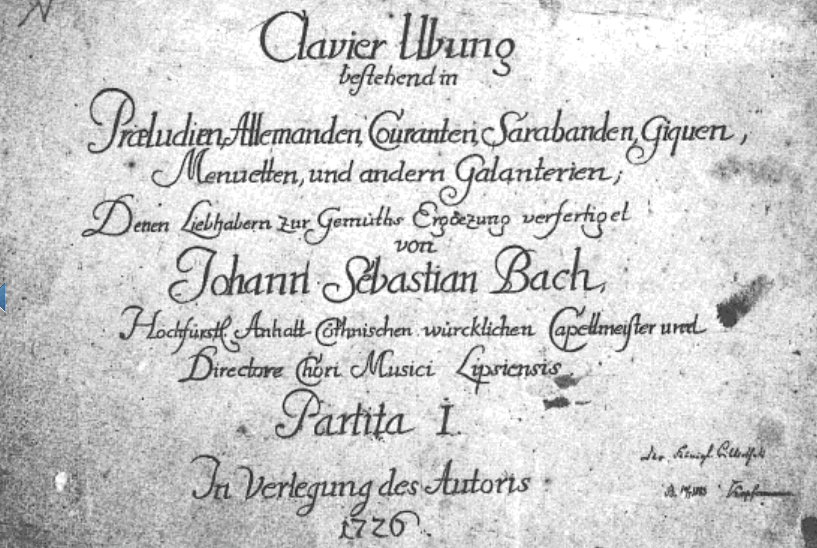
Title page of the 1726 edition of BWV 825, the first of six partitas that would be grouped into Clavier-Übung I in 1731

Bach's Six Partitas, BWV 825–830, for harpsichord, were published in instalments from 1726 to 1730:

1. Autumn 1726: Partita No. 1 in B♭ major, BWV 825.
2. Easter 1727: Partita No. 2 in C minor, BWV 826.
3. Michaelmas 1727: Partita No. 3 in A minor, BWV 827.
4. 1728: Partita No. 4 in D major, BWV 828.
5. 1730: Partita No. 5 in G major, BWV 829.
6. 1730: Partita No. 6 in E minor, BWV 830.

In 1731 these partitas were collectively published as Clavier-Übung ("Keyboard Exercise").

Publication
According to an announcement published in May 1730, it was originally planned to publish seven suites.

Handexemplar
In 1774 Carl Philipp Emanuel Bach, son of Johann Sebastian, sold a print of Clavier-Übung I from his father's personal library to Johann Nikolaus Forkel. In 2008 Andrew Talle identified SH J. S. Bach 56 of the Austrian National Library as the Handexemplar that changed hands in 1774. Previously, Bach scholars had (tentatively) identified Bach's Handexemplar of Clavier-Übung I as either 3.3.B2 Case of the Music Division of the Library of Congress (e.g. Peter Wollny in 1996) or Hirsch III. 37 of the British Library (e.g. Walter Emery in 1952, and Richard D. P. Jones in 1978, 1988 and 1997).

=== Canon a 4 ===
Bach's "Canon mit 4" (canon for four voices), BWV 1074, was published in Georg Philipp Telemann's Der getreue Music-Meister in 1728. This canon was also published with two solutions in Johann Mattheson's Der vollkommene Capellmeister in 1739, and with three solutions in Volume 3 of Lorenz Christoph Mizler's Musikalische Bibliothek in 1747.

=== Clavier-Übung II ===
The second volume of the Clavier-Übung was first published in 1735, soon followed by a reprint with several corrections. It contained two compositions, specified for performance on a two-manual harpsichord:

- Concerto nach Italienischen Gusto (Italian Concerto), BWV 971
- Ouvertüre nach Französischer Art (French Overture), BWV 831

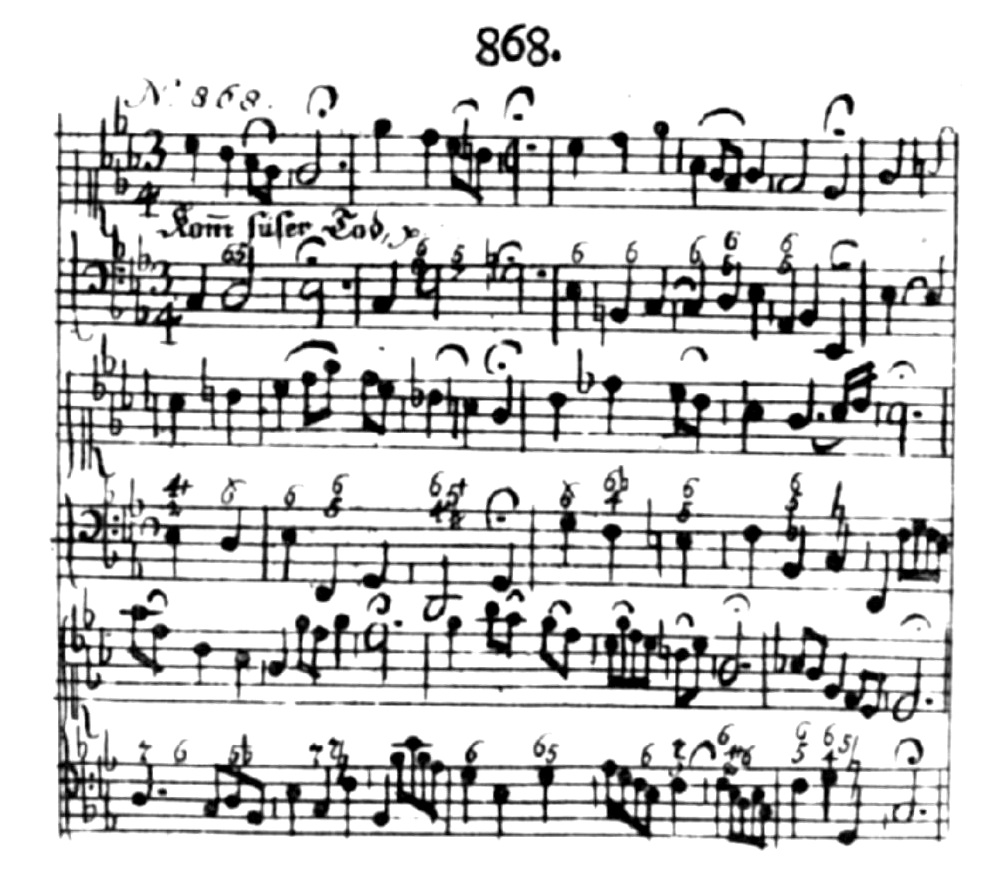
"Komm, süßer Tod", BWV 478, No. 868 in Schemelli's Musicalisches Gesang-Buch

Publication
Clavier-Übung II was printed in Nürnberg by Christoph Weigel. In the second printing pages 20 to 22 were replaced by new engravings.

Handexemplar
K.8.g.7 from the British Library was Bach's Handexemplar: it is a copy from the first print run with more than hundred corrections in Bach's hand.

=== Spiritual songs and arias from Schemelli's Musicalisches Gesang-Buch ===
Georg Christian Schemelli's Musicalisches Gesang-Buch (musical songbook), commonly known as Schemellis Gesangbuch, contains 954 song texts, 69 of which, BWV 439–507, are printed with a setting for singing voice and thoroughbass. Not all 69 melodies were composed by Bach, but he provided (or "improved") an accompaniment for all of them. Schemellis Gesangbuch was published in 1736, and contains some of Bach's probably least known compositions.

=== Clavier-Übung III ===
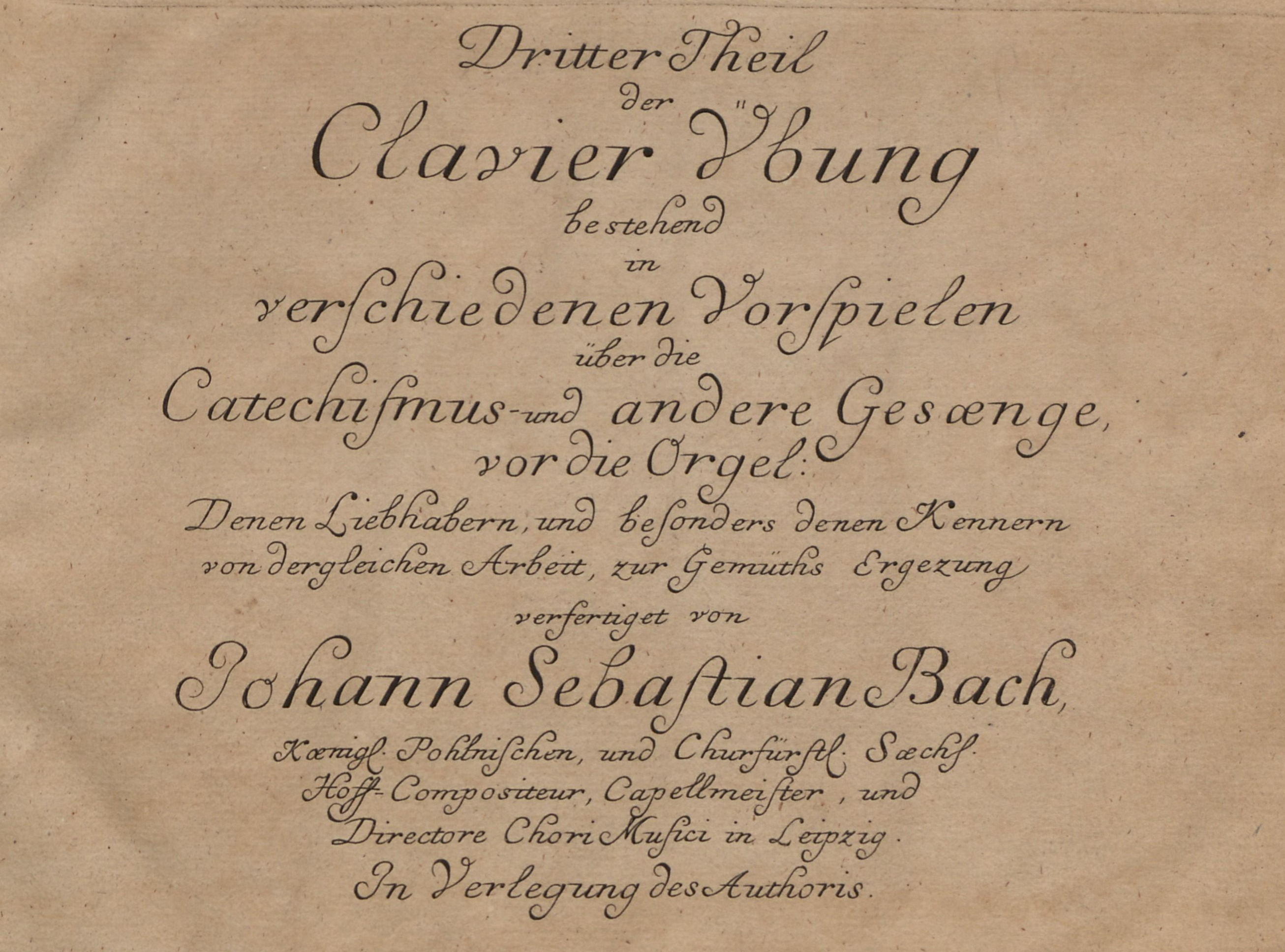
Title page of Clavier-Übung III

For organ, containing:

- Prelude in E♭ major, BWV 552/i
- German Kyrie and Gloria settings, BWV 669–677
- Catechism chorales, BWV 678–689
- Four duets, BWV 802–805
- Fugue E♭ major, BWV 552/ii

The Prelude and Fugue were published separately as a pair by C. F. Peters in 1845 in Volume III of the Organ Works of J. S. Bach, with the fugue listed in the contents as the "St Annen-Fuge".

=== Clavier-Übung IV ===
In 1741 or 1742 another Clavier-Übung volume was published, the Aria with diverse variations for double manual harpsichord, later known as the Goldberg Variations, BWV 988. Not thus numbered in the print it was the fourth Clavier-Übung publication. This publication does not carry a reference to Johann Gottlieb Goldberg: the music was published over half a century before the perhaps exaggerated anecdote involving Goldberg was printed in Forkel's biography of Bach.

Publication
The work was published by Balthasar Schmid in Nürnberg.

Handexemplar
Ms. 17669 is at the Bibliothèque nationale de France (BnF). It contains corrections by Bach as well as the autograph manuscript of the canons BWV 1087.

=== Canon triplex a 6 ===
The Canon triplex a 6, BWV 1076, which had appeared on Elias Gottlob Haussmann's portrait of Bach in 1746, was printed in 1747.

=== Canonic Variations on "Vom Himmel hoch da komm' ich her" ===
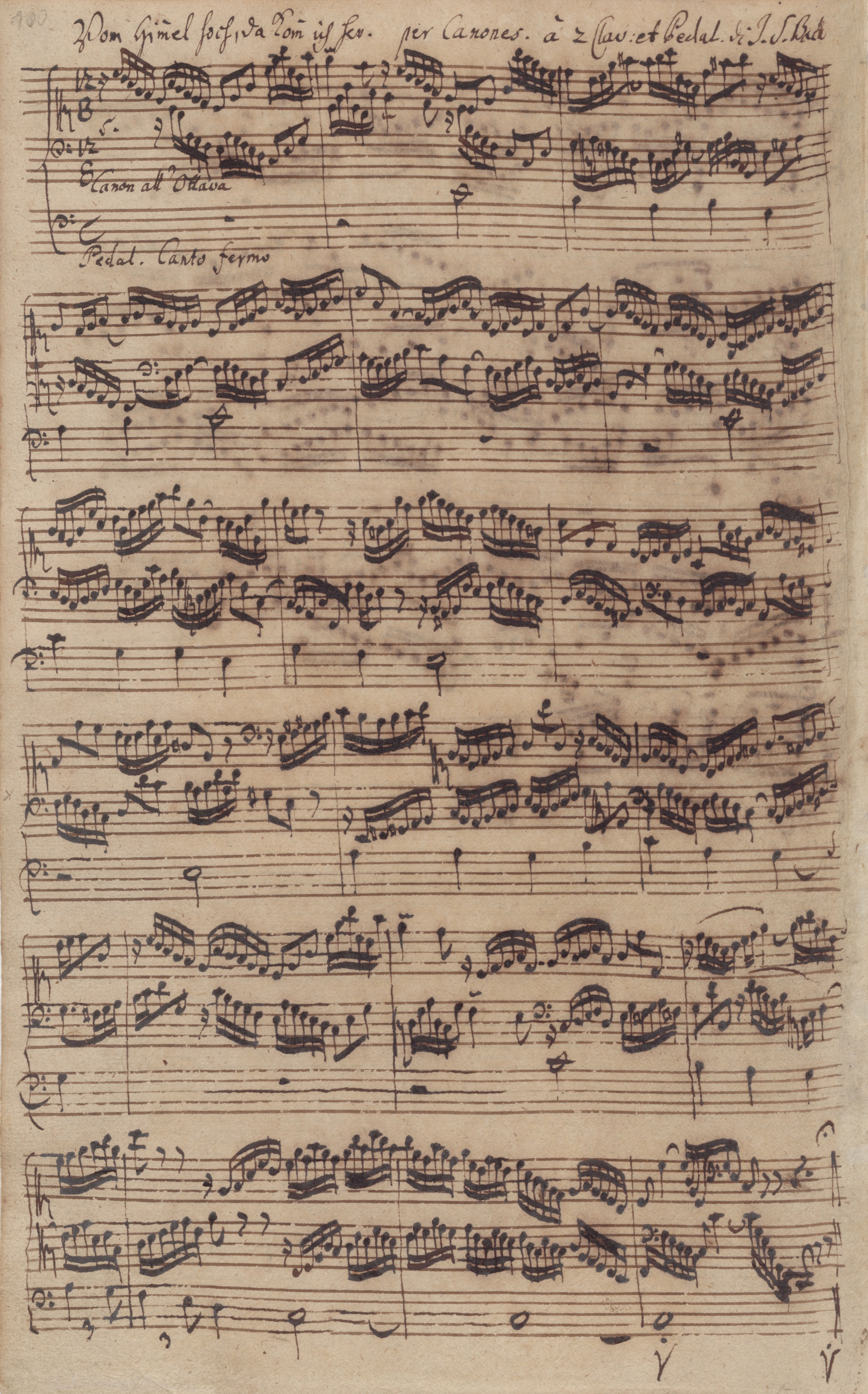
Autograph manuscript of second version of first Canonic Variation

The Canonic Variations on "Vom Himmel hoch da komm' ich her", BWV 769, for organ, were published on the occasion of Bach's admission to Mizler's "Society of the Musical Sciences" in 1747.

=== Musikalisches Opfer ===
The Musical Offering, BWV 1079, was published in 1747, after Bach's visit to Frederick the Great in Potsdam. The work contains a trio sonata for flute, violin and continuo.

=== Schübler Chorales ===
The Schübler Chorales, BWV 645–650, is a set of chorale preludes for organ, published around 1748 as Sechs Chorale von verschiedener Art (Six Chorales of Various Kinds) by Johann Georg Schübler.

Publication
There is some doubt whether Bach commissioned the publication, which mainly, perhaps even exclusively, consists of arrangements of cantata movements which he had composed a few decades earlier. The work was published in Zella Melsi, and the engraver apparently prepared the print unsupervised by the composer. It is likely that Bach at least chose the six pieces, determined their sequence in the publication, and gave some instruction on the organ registration to be employed.

Handexemplar
Bach's Handexemplar is part of the Scheide Library at Princeton University Library. It contains several corrections by Bach, but misses the title page and the first page of music.

=== Kunst der Fuge ===
In preparation for print when the composer died (1750): The Art of Fugue, BWV 1080. The printed versions (1751 and 1752) contain BWV 668a, a variant of the chorale prelude "Wenn wir in höchsten Nöten sein", BWV 668.

== Sources ==
=== Music prints ===
- Bach, Johann Sebastian (1708). Glückwünschende Kirchen Motetto, als bey solennen Gottesdienste in der Haupt-Kirchen B. M. V. der gesegnete Raths-Wechsel am 4. Februarii dieses M.D.C.C.VIII. Jahres geschach (in German). Mühlhausen: Tobias David Brückner. RISM 990003393 – facsimile: Mus. 11495 R at Berlin State Library (D-B Mus. 11495 at Bach Digital website).
- Bach, Johann Sebastian (1726). Clavier Ubung bestehend in Praeludien, Allemanden, Couranten, Sarabanden, Giquen, Menuetten, und andern Galanterien; Denen Liebhabern zur Gemüths Ergoezung verfertiget: Partita I. Leipzig. RISM 990003430.
- Bach, Johann Sebastian (1727a). Clavier Ubung bestehend in Praeludien, Allemanden, Couranten, Sarabanden, Giquen, Menuetten, und andern Galanterien; Denen Liebhabern zur Gemüths Ergoezung verfertiget: Partita II. Leipzig. RISM 990003431.
- Bach, Johann Sebastian (1727b). Clavier Ubung bestehend in Praeludien, Allemanden, Couranten, Sarabanden, Giquen, Menuetten, und andern Galanterien; Denen Liebhabern zur Gemüths Ergoezung verfertiget: Partita III. Leipzig. RISM 990003432.
- Bach, Johann Sebastian (1728). Clavier Ubung bestehend in Praeludien, Allemanden, Couranten, Sarabanden, Giquen, Menuetten, und andern Galanterien; Denen Liebhabern zur Gemüths Ergoezung verfertiget: Partita IV. Leipzig. RISM 991013402.
- Bach, Johann Sebastian (1730). Clavier Ubung bestehend in Praeludien, Allemanden, Couranten, Sarabanden, Giquen, Menuetten, und andern Galanterien; Denen Liebhabern zur Gemüths Ergoezung verfertiget: Partita V. Leipzig. RISM 990003433.
- Bach, Johann Sebastian (1731). Clavir Ubung bestehend in Praeludien, Allemanden, Couranten, Sarabanden, Giguen, Menuetten, und andern Galanterien; Denen Liebhabern zur Gemüths Ergoetzung verfertiget: Opus 1. Leipzig. RISM 990003434 – facsimiles: D-LEb Peters PM 1402 at Bach Digital website; Kenny 2274 at Baldwin Wallace University; 2 B122p 1731 at Juilliard School; Mus.2405.T.46 at SLUB.
- Bach, Johann Sebastian (1735). Zweyter Theil der Clavier Übung bestehend in einem Concerto nach italienischem Gusto und einer Overture nach Französischer Art, vor ein Clavicymbel mit zweyen Manualen: Denen Liebhabern zu Gemüths-Ergötzung verfertiget. Nürnberg: Christoph Weigel Jr. RISM 990003441 – facsimile (2nd printing, c. 1736): DMS 224676(2) at Berlin State Library (D-B DMS 224676 (2) Rara at Bach Digital website).
- Bach, Johann Sebastian (1739). Dritter Theil der Clavier Übung bestehend in verschiedenen Vorspielen über die Catechismus- und andere Gesaenge, vor die Orgel: Denen Liebhabern, und besonders denen Kennern von dergleichen Arbeit, zur Gemüths Ergezung. Leipzig. RISM 990003442 – facsimiles: D-LEb Peters PM 1403 and US-PRu M 3.1. B2 C5. 1739q (Ex.) at Bach Digital website; SA.82.F.15 at Austrian National Library (A-Wn SA.82.F.15 at Bach Digital website).
- Bach, Johann Sebastian (1741–1742). Clavier Ubung bestehend in einer Aria mit verschiedenen Veraenderungen vors Clavicimbal mit 2 Manualen: Denen Liebhabern zu Gemüths-Ergetzung verfertiget. Nürnberg: Balthasar Schmid. RISM 990003445 – facsimiles: MS-17669 at Gallica (Handexemplar, BnF 39780493d); D-LEb Peters PM 1400 at Bach Digital website; Kenny 548 at Baldwin Wallace University.
- Bach, Johann Sebastian (1747). Canon triplex a 6 Voci. Facsimile: MS64460-4° R/XVIII/Bach/2 at Austrian National Library (A-Wn MS 64460 at Bach Digital website).
- Bach, Johann Sebastian (1747–1748). Einige canonische Veraenderungen über das Weynacht-Lied: Vom Himmel hoch da komm ich her. vor die Orgel mit 2. Clavieren und dem Pedal. Nürnberg: Balthasar Schmid. RISM 990003419 – facsimiles: Am.B. 80 at Berlin State Library; M3.3 .B118v at University of Rochester; Kenny 1512 at Baldwin Wallace University; mu 6406.1830 H. & Fr. Rungs Musik-Arkiv No 1535, U 20 and mu 6407.2832 Weyses Samling, U 20 at Royal Library, Denmark; Ohki N-7 (4) at Nanki Music Library, Tokyo.
- Bach, Johann Sebastian (1747–1749). Musicalisches Opfer (in German). Johann Georg Schübler. RISM 990003474 – facsimiles: Am.B 73 at Berlin State Library (D-B Am.B 73, Fascicle 1 and Fascicle 2 at Bach Digital website); Am.B 74 at Berlin State Library (D-B Am.B 74 at Bach Digital website); BWV 1079 at Baldwin Wallace University.
- Bach, Johann Sebastian (c. 1748). Sechs Chorale von verschiedener Art auf einer Orgel mit 2 Clavieren und Pedal vorzuspielen. Zella: Johann Georg Schübler. RISM 990003418 – facsimiles: D-LEb Peters PM 5694 at Bach Digital website; DMS O. 80758 at Berlin State Library (D-B DMS O. 80758 Rara at Bach Digital website); SH.J.S.Bach.40 at Austrian National Library (A-Wn SH J. S. Bach 40 at Bach Digital website).
- Bach, Johann Sebastian (1751–1752). Die Kunst der Fuge (in German). RISM 991013428 (first edition, 1751) and RISM 991013429 (second edition, with preface by Marpurg, 1752) – facsimiles: mu 6406.2030 H. & Fr. Rungs Musik-Arkiv No 226A, U 315 at Royal Library, Denmark (1751 edition, DK-Kk mu 6406.2030 H. & Fr. Rungs Musik-Arkiv No 226A, U 315 at Bach Digital website); Mus. O. 17364 at Berlin State Library (1752 edition, D-B Mus. O. 17364 Rara at Bach Digital website); BWV 1080 at Baldwin Wallace University (1752 edition, US-BER Kenney 1814, Vault: M 24.B2 at Bach Digital website).
- Mattheson, Johann (1739). Der vollkommene Capellmeister (in German). Hamburg: Herold.
- Mizler, Lorenz Christoph (1747). Musikalische Bibliothek ... Des dritten bandes Dritter Theil. Mit zwölf Kupfertafeln. Musikalische Bibliothek (in German). Vol. III, 3. Leipzig: Mizler.
- Schemelli, Georg Christian (1736). Musicalisches Gesang-Buch, Darinnen 954 geistreiche, sowohl alte als neue Lieder und Arien, mit wohlgesetzten Melodien, in Discant und Baß, befindlich sind: Vornehmlich denen Evangelischen Gemeinen im Stifte Naumburg-Zeitz gewidmet (in German). Leipzig: Bernhard Christoph Breitkopf. RISM 990003407 – facsimiles: 1077430 Liturg. 1372 o at Bavarian State Library; szMJMq_zmygC at Google Books; Musicalisches Gesang-Buch (Schemelli, Georg Christian): Scores at the International Music Score Library Project.
- Telemann, Georg Philipp (1728). Der getreue Music-Meister (in German). Hamburg.. RISM 990063956 – facsimiles: VM7-3878 at Gallica (BnF 397929328); Mus.2392.B.1 at SLUB; M B/4987 at Staats- und Universitätsbibliothek Hamburg. Der getreue Music-Meister

=== Other ===
- Bach, Carl Philipp Emanuel; Agricola, Johann Friedrich (1754). "C. Der dritte und letzte ist der im Orgelspielen Weltberühmte HochEdle Herr Johann Sebastian Bach, Königlich-Pohlnischer und Churfürstlich Sächsicher Hofcompositeur, und Musikdirector in Leipzig". In Mizler, Lorenz Christoph (ed.). Musikalische Bibliothek ... Des vierten bandes Erster Theil. Mit vier Kupfertafeln. Musikalische Bibliothek (in German). Vol. IV, 1. Leipzig: Mizler. pp. 158–176.
- Breig, Werner (2010). "Introduction" (PDF). Complete Organ Works – Breitkopf Urtext (New Edition in 10 Volumes), Vol. 6: Clavierübung III / Schübler-Choräle / Canonische Veränderungen über "Vom Himmel hoch". Breitkopf & Härtel. pp. 14–20.
- Emans, Reinmar; Hiemke, Sven (2015), "Editionen der Werke Johann Sebastian Bachs", in Emans, Reinmar; Krämer, Ulrich (eds.), Musikeditionen im Wandel der Geschichte (in German), Walter de Gruyter, pp. 227–260, ISBN 978-3110434354
- Forkel, Johann Nikolaus (1802). Ueber Johann Sebastian Bachs Leben, Kunst und Kunstwerke. Leipzig: Hoffmeister und Kühnel.
- Forkel, Johann Nikolaus; Terry, Charles Sanford (1920). Johann Sebastian Bach: His Life, Art and Work – translated from the German, with notes and appendices. New York: Harcourt, Brace and Howe.
- Schneider, Max [in German] (1907). "Verzeichnis der bis zum Jahre 1851 gedruckten (und der geschrieben im Handel gewesenen) Werke von Johann Sebastian Bach". Bach-Jahrbuch 1906. Bach-Jahrbuch (in German). Breitkopf & Härtel. pp. 84–113.
- Talbot, Michael (2011). "Bach, Johann Sebastian". The Vivaldi Compendium. Boydell Press. pp. 28–29. ISBN 978-1843836704.
- Talle, Andrew (2008). "A Print of Clavierübung I from J.S. Bach's Personal Library". In Stauffer, George; Butler, Gregory (eds.). About Bach. University of Illinois Press. pp. 157–168. ISBN 978-0-252-03344-5.
- Walther, Johann Gottfried (1732). "Bach (Joh. Sebastian)". Musicalisches Lexicon (in German). Leipzig: W. Deer. p. 64. Musicalisches Lexicon oder Musicalische Bibliothec
- Williams, Peter [in German] (2016). Bach: A Musical Biography. Cambridge University Press. ISBN 978-1316531389.
- Wolff, Christoph (1991). Bach: Essays on His Life and Music. Harvard University Press. ISBN 0674059263.
- Wolff, Christoph (2002). "At the Blasius Church in Mühlhausen". Johann Sebastian Bach: The Learned Musician. Norton. pp. 102–115. ISBN 9780199248841.
- Wollny, Peter (1996). "Zur Überlieferung der Instrumentalwerke Johann Sebastian Bachs: Der Quellenbesitz Carl Philipp Emanuel Bachs" [On the transmission of instrumental compositions by Johann Sebastian Bach: the sources owned by Carl Philipp Emanuel Bach]. In Schulze, Hans-Joachim; Wolff, Christoph (eds.). Bach-Jahrbuch 1996 [Bach Yearbook 1996]. Bach-Jahrbuch (in German). Vol. 82. Neue Bachgesellschaft. Leipzig: Evangelische Verlagsanstalt. pp. 7–21. doi:10.13141/bjb.v1996. ISBN 3-374-01630-8. ISSN 0084-7682 – via Qucosa.
