= Clavier-Übung =

German for "keyboard exercise"

Clavier-Übung, in more modern spelling Klavierübung, is German for "keyboard exercise". In the late 17th and early 18th centuries this was a common title for keyboard music collections: first adopted by Johann Kuhnau in 1689, the term later became mostly associated with Johann Sebastian Bach's four Clavier-Übung publications.

The following composers published works under the title Clavier-Übung:

- Johann Sebastian Bach:
  - Clavier-Übung I: six partitas, published separately 1726–1730, then grouped in one volume in 1731
  - Clavier-Übung II: Italian Concerto and French Overture (1735)
  - Clavier-Übung III: also known as the German Organ Mass (1739)
  - Clavier-Übung IV: Aria with Diverse Variations, known as the Goldberg Variations (1741)
- Ferruccio Busoni
  - Klavierübung (1918–1925)
- Christoph Graupner:
  - Leichte Clavier-Übungen (c.1730)
- Johann Ludwig Krebs
  - Clavier Ubung Bestehend in verschiedenen vorspielen und veränderungen einiger Kirchen Gesaenge Nürnberg, J.U. Haffner, c. 1744)
  - Clavier-Ubung bestehet in einer [...] Suite [...] Zweyter Theil (Nürnberg, J.U. Haffner, c. 1744)
  - Clavier-Ubung bestehend in sechs Sonatinen … IIIter Theil (Nürnberg, J.U. Haffner, c. 1744)
- Johann Philipp Kirnberger
  - Clavierübungen mit der bachischen Applicatur, four volumes, 1761–1766
- Johann Krieger
  - Anmuthige Clavier-Übung (1698)
- Johann Kuhnau:
  - Neuer Clavier-Übung, erster Theil (1689)
  - Neuer Clavier-Übung, anderer Theil (1692)
- Vincent Lübeck
  - Clavier Übung (1728)
- Georg Andreas Sorge
  - Clavier Übung in three parts, 18 sonatas for harpsichord (1738–c.1745)
  - Clavier Übung in two parts, 24 preludes for organ or clavichord (1739–42)

== Sources ==
- Wolff, Christoph (1991), "Chapter 15: The Clavier-Übung Series", Bach: essays on his life and music, Harvard University Press, ISBN 0-674-05926-3
- Boyd, Malcolm (2006), Bach, The Master Musicians Series (3 ed.), Oxford University Press, ISBN 0-19-530771-2
