= Clavier-Übung (Bach) =

There are four Clavier-Übung (keyboard practice) volumes by Johann Sebastian Bach, all of them published during his lifetime:

1. Clavier-Übung I, for harpsichord, contains six partitas, BWV 825–830, which were published separately from 1726 to 1730, and then grouped into one publication in 1731
2. Clavier-Übung II, for harpsichord with two manuals, contains the Italian Concerto, BWV 971 and the Overture in the French style, BWV 831, and was published in 1735
3. Clavier-Übung III, for organ, contains the Prelude and Fugue in E flat major, BWV 552, 21 chorale preludes, BWV 669–689, and the Four Duets, BWV 802–805, and was published in 1739
4. Clavier-Übung IV, better known as the Goldberg Variations, for harpsichord with two manuals, was published in 1741
