= Pascal Dubreuil =

French harpsichordist

- Born: 1970
- Origin: France
- Occupation: Specialist of musical rhetoric.

Pascal Dubreuil (born c. 1970) is a French harpsichordist, a teacher and a specialist of musical rhetoric.

== Biography ==
After several years study with Yannick le Gaillard, Pascal Dubreuil was awarded diplomas in both harpsichord and basso continuo from the Conservatoire National Supérieur de Musique in Paris. He continued his studies with various teachers, notably Kenneth Gilbert, and especially Gustav Leonhardt. He also studied orchestral direction with Nicholas Brochot.

He was a prizewinner at the Competition Musica Antiqua Bruges (MAfestival Brugge) in 1997.

He has appeared throughout Europe as a harpsichordist, but also on the clavichord and fortepiano. This has been both as soloist and chamber musician, particularly with Musica Aeterna Bratislava, and as continuo-player with various ensembles such as Ensemble vocal de l'Abbaye aux Dames de Saintes and Ensemble Sagittarius, as well as with soloists such as Claire Michon (recorder), Patrick Ayrton (as a harpsichord duo), François Fernandez (baroque violin), Marie Rouquié (baroque violin), Bruno Boterf (tenor) and Ricardo Rapoport (bassoon).

Pascal Dubreuil is invited for festivals such as the Printemps des Arts, the Académies musicales de Saintes, the Festival de Música Antiga in Barcelona, the festival Dni starej hudby in Bratislava or the Klavier Festival Ruhr.

In 2009 Pascal Dubreuil founded the ensemble Il Nuovo Concerto, of which he is the artistic director. Il Nuovo Concerto specialises in 17th- and 18th-century music.

In 2011 he founded the festival Baroque... et vous ?, the first festival of baroque music in Rennes (Brittany).

== Recordings ==
Pascal Dubreuil has recorded with the labels Le Chant du Monde, K 617 and Arion. Now he records with the German label Ramée.

- 2013: Johann Sebastian Bach, Fait pour les Anglois, The English suites BWV 806–811, Ramée 1207.
- 2010: Johann Sebastian Bach, Clavier-Übung II, Ramée 1001 : Italian Concerto BWV 971, Overture in the French style BWV 831, Prelude, Fugue & allegro BWV 998, Chromatic fantasy and fugue BWV 903.
- 2008: Johann Sebastian Bach, Clavier-Übung I, Six Partitas, BWV 825-830, Ramée 0804.
- 2007: Antoine Dard, Sonates pour le basson, Six Sonatas for bassoon and basso continuo, with Ricardo Rapoport, bassoon, Ramée 0702, world premiere.

== Musical rhetoric ==
As a soloist or together with the ensemble Il Nuovo Concerto, Pascal Dubreuil has been working on musical rhetoric for years. His research led him to co-publish the first complete French translation of Joachim Burmeister's 1606 treatise Musica Poetica, as well as important extracts from two of Burmeister's other treatises, Hypomnematum musicae poeticae (1599) and Musica autoschédiastikè (1601).

== Teaching ==
Pascal Dubreuil teaches harpsichord, basso continuo and chamber music at the early music department of the Rennes Conservatoire.

He also teaches harpsichord, basso continuo and musical rhetoric (Bachelor/Master) at the Centre d'Études Supérieures de Musique et de Danse in Poitiers.

Pascal Dubreuil is also often invited as a member of juries for exams and competitions, and to lead masterclasses, both in France and Europe.

== Links ==
- Pascal Dubreuil's official website
- Centre d'études supérieures musique et danse de Poitiers
- Preview of the book Joachim Burmeister, Musica poetica (1606) augmentée des plus excellentes remarques tirées de Hypomnematum musicae poeticae (1599) et de Musica autoschédiastikè (1601), introduction, Latin text and French translation, notes and lexicon by Agathe Sueur and Pascal Dubreuil, Wavre, Mardaga, 2007
