= Partitas for keyboard (Bach) =

Collection of keyboard works by Johann Sebastian Bach

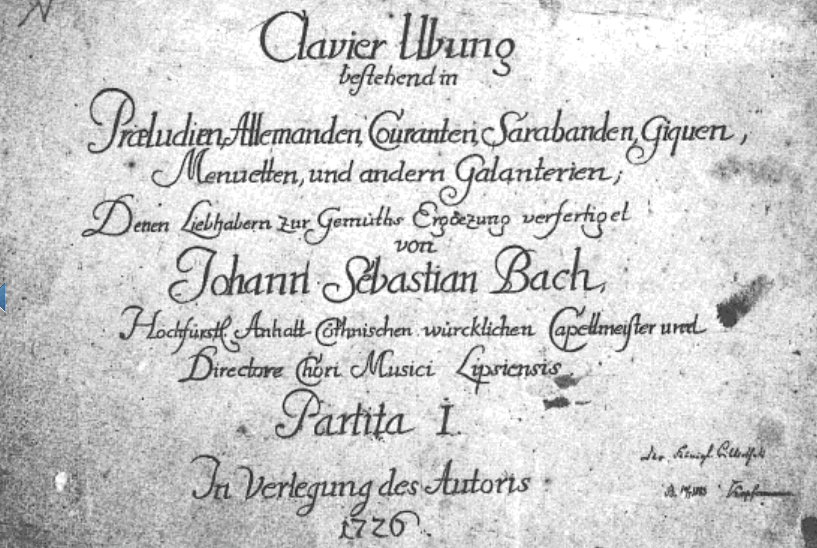
Title page of the first partita, printed in 1726 by Balthasar Schmid of Nuremberg

The Partitas, BWV 825–830, are a set of six keyboard suites written by Johann Sebastian Bach, published individually beginning in 1726, then together as Clavier-Übung I in 1731, the first of his works to be published under his own direction. They were, however, among the last of his keyboard suites to be composed, the others being the six English Suites, BWV 806-811 and the six French Suites, BWV 812-817, as well as the Overture in the French style, BWV 831.

== History ==
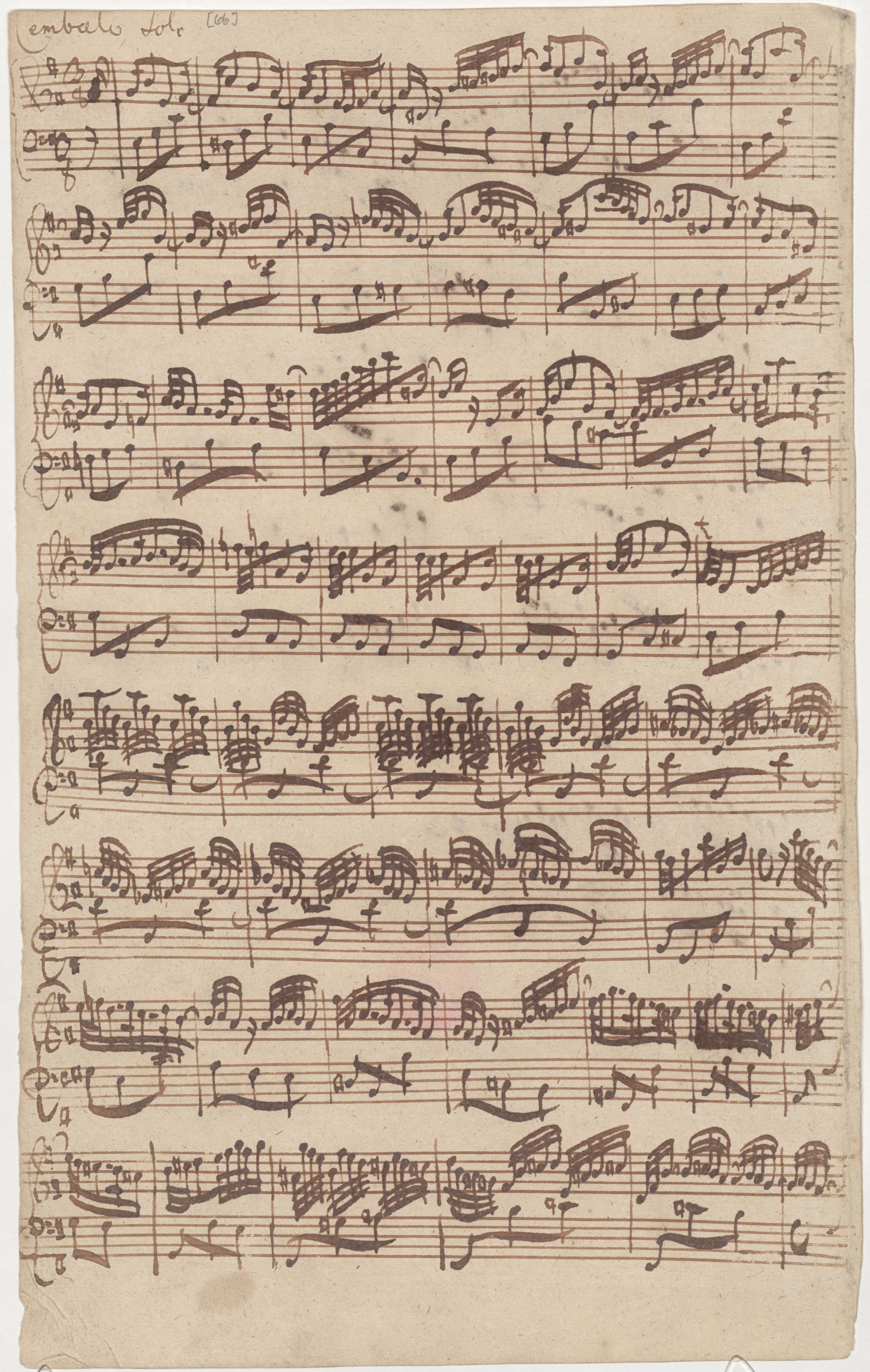
Autograph manuscript (1725) of Allegro for solo harpsichord from first version of Bach's sixth sonata for obbligato harpsichord and violin, BWV 1019a, later incorporated as Corrente in sixth partita, BWV 830.

The six partitas for keyboard form the last set of suites that Bach composed and are the most technically demanding of the three. They were composed between 1725 and 1730 or 1731. As with the French and English Suites, the autograph manuscript of the Partitas is no longer extant.

In keeping with a 19th-century naming tradition that labelled Bach's first set of Suites English and the second French, the Partitas are sometimes referred to as the German Suites. This title, however, is a publishing convenience; there is nothing particularly German about the Partitas. In comparison with the two earlier sets of suites, the Partitas are by far the most free-ranging in terms of structure. Unlike the English Suites, for example, wherein each opens with a strict prelude, the Partitas feature a number of different opening styles including an ornamental Overture and a Toccata.

Although each of the Partitas was published separately under the name Clavier-Übung (Keyboard Practice), they were subsequently collected into a single volume in 1731 with the same name, which Bach himself chose to label his Opus 1. Unlike the earlier sets of suites, Bach originally intended to publish seven Partitas, advertising in the spring of 1730 upon the publication of the fifth Partita that the promised collected volume would contain two more such pieces. The plan was then revised to include a total of eight works: six Partitas in Part I (1731) and two larger works in Part II (1735), the Italian Concerto, BWV 971, and the Overture in the French style, BWV 831. The second of these is an eight-movement partita, the largest such keyboard work Bach ever composed, and may in fact be the elusive "seventh partita" mentioned in 1730. The Overture in the French style was originally written in C minor, but was transposed a half step down for publication to complete the tonal scheme of Parts I and II as described below.

== Keys ==
The tonalities of the six Partitas (B♭ major, C minor, A minor, D major, G major, E minor) may seem to be random, but in fact they form a sequence of intervals going up and then down by increasing amounts: a second up (B♭ to C), a third down (C to A), a fourth up (A to D), a fifth down (D to G), and finally a sixth up (G to E). This suggests the theme of the "Wedge" Fugue in E minor for organ, which Bach composed around the same period as the Partitas.

This key sequence continues into Clavier-Übung II (1735) with the two larger works: the Italian Concerto, a seventh down (E to F), and the Overture in the French style, an augmented fourth up (F to B♮). Thus this sequence of tonalities customary for 18th-century keyboard compositions is complete, beginning with the first letter of his name (B in German is Bach's "home" key of B♭) and ending with the last letter (H in German is B♮) while including both A and C along the way.

== Six partitas ==
The six Partitas and their movements are shown below.

1. Partita No. 1 in B♭ major, BWV 825
  1. Praeludium
  2. Allemande
  3. Corrente
  4. Sarabande
  5. Menuet I–II–I
  6. Giga
2. Partita No. 2 in C minor, BWV 826
  1. Sinfonia (Grave adagio – Andante)
  2. Allemande
  3. Courante
  4. Sarabande
  5. Rondeaux
  6. Capriccio
3. Partita No. 3 in A minor, BWV 827
  1. Fantasia
  2. Allemande
  3. Corrente
  4. Sarabande
  5. Burlesca
  6. Scherzo
  7. Gigue
4. Partita No. 4 in D major, BWV 828
  1. Ouvertüre
  2. Allemande
  3. Courante
  4. Aria
  5. Sarabande
  6. Menuet
  7. Gigue
5. Partita No. 5 in G major, BWV 829
  1. Praeambulum
  2. Allemande
  3. Corrente
  4. Sarabande
  5. Tempo di Minuetta
  6. Passepied
  7. Gigue
6. Partita No. 6 in E minor, BWV 830
  1. Toccata
  2. Allemanda
  3. Corrente
  4. Air
  5. Sarabande
  6. Tempo di Gavotta
  7. Gigue

== Notable recordings ==
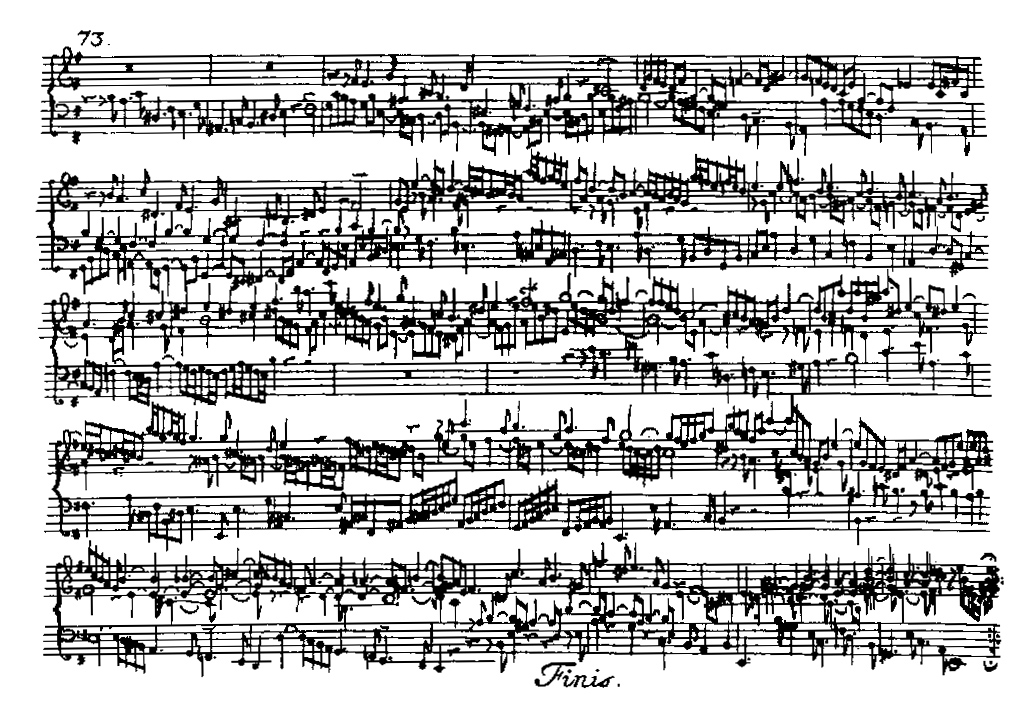
Close of final Gigue from Partita No. 6, BWV 830, first edition, 1731

=== On clavichord ===
- Richard Troeger (Lyrichord Discs, 2000) first recorded the partitas on clavichord.
- Menno van Delft (Resonus Classics, 2018)

=== On harpsichord ===
- Wanda Landowska (1935 or 1936)
- Ralph Kirkpatrick (1958)
- Helmut Walcha (EMI, 1962)
- Gustav Leonhardt (Deutsche Harmonia Mundi, 1964–70 and Virgin, 1986)
- Martin Galling (1964)
- Karl Richter (TELDEC Telefunken-Decca, 1960, SAWT9913-B SAWT9914-B)
- Blandine Verlet (Philips, 1978 and Naïve, 2001)
- Kenneth Gilbert (Harmonia Mundi, 1985)
- Trevor Pinnock (Archiv, 1985 and Hänssler, 1998–99)
- Huguette Dreyfus (Denon, 1986)
- Scott Ross (Erato, 1988)
- Christophe Rousset (L'Oiseau-Lyre, 1992)
- Andreas Staier (Deutsche Harmonia Mundi, 1993)
- Siegbert Rampe (EMI Music Germany, 2000)
- Masaaki Suzuki (BIS, 2001)
- Zuzana Růžičková (Supraphon, 1984)
- Pascal Dubreuil (Ramée, 2008)
- Benjamin Alard (Alpha, 2010)
- Peter Watchorn (Musica Omnia, 2013)
- Martin Gester (Ligia, 2015)
- Mireille Lagacé (Calliope, 2015)
- Jory Vinikour (Sono Luminus, 2016)
- Colin Tilney (Music and Arts, 2020)
- Giulia Nuti (Arcana, 2024)

=== On piano ===
- Rosalyn Tureck (1949/50; Philips, 1956)
- Dinu Lipatti (BWV 825), (EMI Classics, 1950)
- Glenn Gould (Sony 1957–1963; 1980)
- Friedrich Gulda (Philips, 1972)
- Tatiana Nikolayeva (Melodija 1981)
- Jean Louis Steuerman (Philips, 1984)
- András Schiff (Decca Classics, 1985)
- Maria Tipo (EMI, 1991)
- Wolfgang Rübsam (Naxos, 1992)
- Risto Lauriala (Alba, 1992)
- Maria João Pires (DGG 447 894-2, 1995)
- Sergey Schepkin (Ongaku, 1996–97)
- Angela Hewitt (Hyperion, 1997)
- Richard Goode (Nonesuch, 2003)
- Gianluca Luisi (OnClassical, 2005–07)
- Martha Argerich (Verbier Festival, 2008)
- Murray Perahia (Sony, 2008 and 2009)
- Vladimir Ashkenazy (Decca, 2010)
- Andres Carciente (Noromusic, 2012)
- Igor Levit (Sony, 2014)
- Yuan Sheng (Piano Classics, 2017)
- Christian Zacharias (MDG, 2021)
- Tingshuo Yang (Luxembourg Classics, 2024)

=== On guitar ===
- Judicael Perroy Partita no.2 (Naxos Records, 2011)

== See also ==
- Works for keyboard by Johann Sebastian Bach
- English Suites, BWV 806-811
- French Suites, BWV 812-817
- List of compositions by Johann Sebastian Bach printed during his lifetime
