= Bach's Nekrolog =

1754 obituary of Johann Sebastian Bach

First page of Bach's Nekrolog, p. 158 in Mizler's Musikalische Bibliothek, Volume IV Part 1 (1754). In English the full title reads: "(Chapter) VI: Memorial of three deceased members of the Society of Musical Sciences; (section) C: The third and last is the one in organ-playing World-famous Highly-esteemed Mr. Johann Sebastian Bach, Royal-Polish and Prince-electoral Saxonian court composer, and music director in Leipzig."

The 1754 obituary of Johann Sebastian Bach is usually called the "Nekrolog." It was published four years after his death.

== Publication ==
The "Nekrolog" appeared in Lorenz Christoph Mizler's Musikalische Bibliothek, a series of publications appearing from 1736 to 1754, reporting on and criticising music. As such it was the organ of Mizler's Musical Society, of which Bach had been a member from 1747. Bach's "Nekrolog" appeared in its last installment, Volume 4, Part 1 in 1754, as the third of three obituaries of former members of the Musical Society. Although no author is indicated in the article, its authors are known to be Carl Philipp Emanuel, Bach's son, and Johann Friedrich Agricola, one of Bach's students.

== Content ==
The "Nekrolog" contains basic data about Bach's family and where he lived, lists compositions, and elaborates a few scenes, notably the young Bach secretly copying a score owned by his eldest brother, the story about a musical competition which Bach "won" by his competitor fleeing the town, and the visit to Frederick the Great in Sanssouci in the later years of his life. The last pages of the "Nekrolog" contain verse in memory of the composer.

=== Ancestors and musicians in the Bach family ===
The "Nekrolog" sets out with tracing some of Bach's forefathers, listing previous composers of the Bach family, and elaborating on their work (pp. 158–160).

=== Eisenach – Ohrdruf – Lüneburg ===
Follows a description of Bach's early youth in Eisenach, the stay with his eldest brother Johann Christoph in Ohrdruf after their parent's death, and the period when he was a student and chorister in Lüneburg (pp. 160–162).

More than a page is devoted to the episode of the secret copying of his brother's manuscript (pp. 160–161). According to the "Nekrolog", Bach went to Lüneburg after his brother's death; however, later research pointed out that Johann Christoph lived at least another 20 years.

=== 1703–1723 ===
Next Bach is followed through his first positions as a musician (pp. 162–166). Again there is an anecdote that is elaborated over more than one page: the failed competition with Louis Marchand in Dresden, while the latter had left the town in the early morning of the day when the competition was scheduled (pp. 163–165).

=== Leipzig ===
The description of Bach's last position as Thomascantor is relatively short, with most attention going to his visit to Potsdam in 1747, and the composer's death in 1750 (pp. 166–167).

=== Lists of works ===
Follows a list of the compositions printed during the composer's life, which however omits the cantata(s) printed in Mühlhausen and songs and arias printed in Schemelli's Gesangbuch (pp. 167–168). The list of unpublished works that follows is all but detailed (pp. 168–169), and seems to exaggerate in numbers and/or indicates that a great number of Bach compositions went lost.

=== Marriages and children ===
The next paragraphs are devoted to Bach's two marriages, and his children (pp. 169–170).

=== Significance as composer ===
The narrative of the "Nekrolog" ends with a sketch of Bach as a musician, and his significance as a composer, with, in its last paragraph, a few sentences on the composer's character (pp. 170–173).

=== Poetry ===
As an epilogue to the "Nekrolog" pp. 173–176 contain poetry in remembrance of Bach.

== Reception ==
The "Nekrolog" played a determining role for the biographies of the composer that were written after it. In the introduction to his normative 19th-century biography of Johann Sebastian Bach, Philipp Spitta names the "Nekrolog" as one of a very few earlier biographies he trusts. Even in the 20th century Bach biographers name the "Nekrolog" as a direct source for their work.

An English translation of the "Nekrolog" is included in The New Bach Reader.

== Sources ==
- Carl Philipp Emanuel Bach and Johann Friedrich Agricola. "Nekrolog" (full title: "VI. Denkmal dreyer verstorbenen Mitglieder der Societät der musikalischen Wissenschafften; C. Der dritte und letzte ist der im Orgelspielen Weltberühmte HochEdle Herr Johann Sebastian Bach, Königlich-Pohlnischer und Churfürstlich Sächsicher Hofcompositeur, und Musikdirector in Leipzig"), pp. 158–176 in Lorenz Christoph Mizler's Musikalische Bibliothek, Volume IV Part 1. Leipzig, Mizlerischer Bücherverlag, 1754.
- A.-E. Cherbuliez. Johann Sebastian Bach: Sein Leben und sein Werk. Olten: Otto Walter, 1946.
- Johann Nikolaus Forkel, translation with notes and appendices by Charles Sanford Terry. Johann Sebastian Bach: His Life, Art, and Work. New York: Harcourt, Brace and Howe; London: Constable. 1920. (e-version at Gutenberg.org)
- Philipp Spitta. Johann Sebastian Bach.
  - Erster Band (Book I–IV). Leipzig: Breitkopf & Härtel. 1873.
    - Third print (1921) at Archive.org
  - Zweiter Band (Book V–VI). Leipzig: Breitkopf & Härtel. 1880.
    - Third print (1921) at Archive.org
  - Johann Sebastian Bach: His Work and Influence on the Music of Germany, 1685–1750 in three volumes. Translated by Clara Bell and J. A. Fuller Maitland. Novello & Co. 1884–1885.
    - 1899 edition: Vol. 1 (Book I–III) – Vol. 2 (Book IV–V) – Vol. 3 (Book VI) at Archive.org
    - 1992 republication of the 1952 Dover edition (with "Bibliographical Note" by Saul Novack): Vol. 1 (Book I–III)
