= József Eötvös (musician) =

Hungarian musician

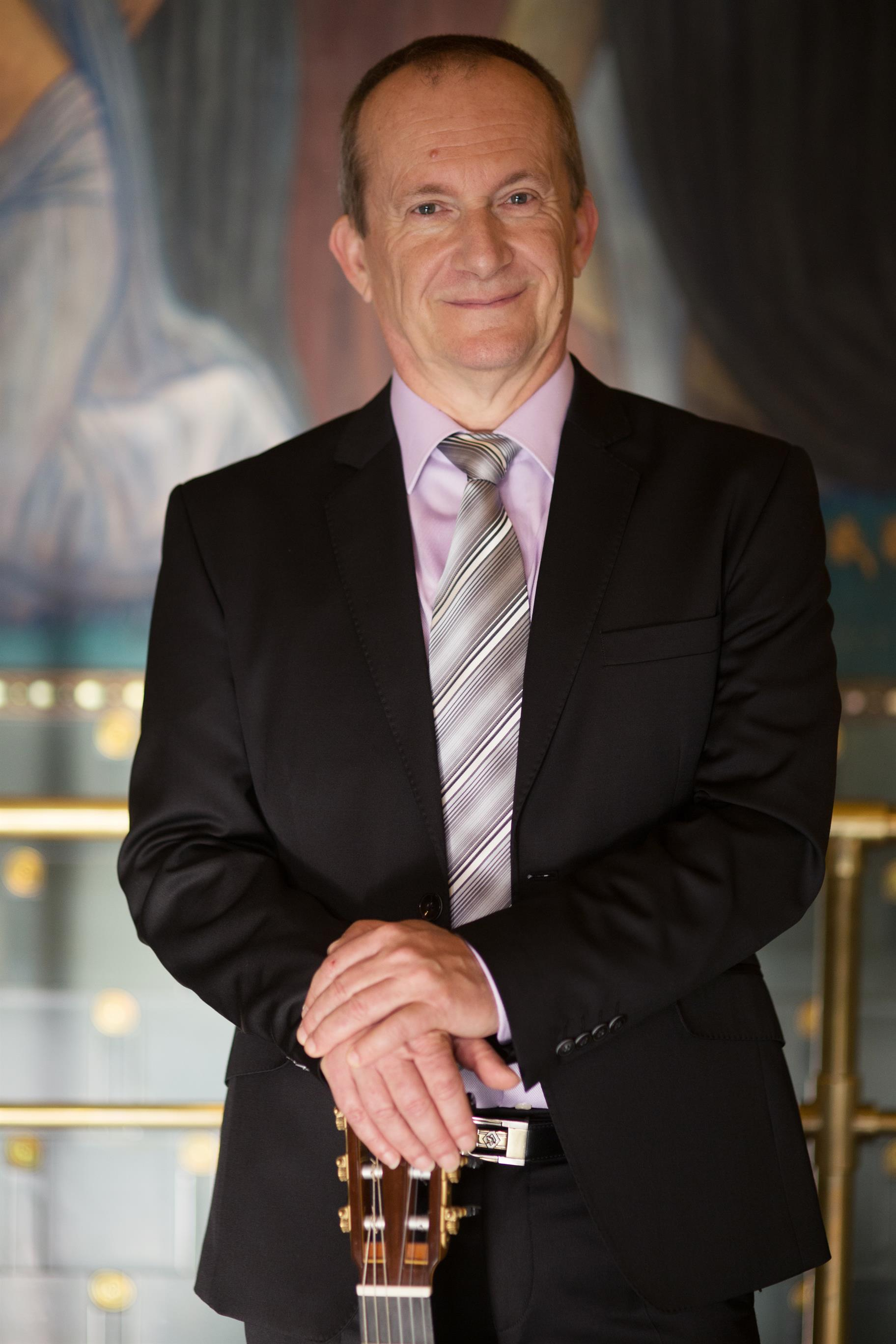

József Eötvös (born 1962, Pécs) is a classical guitarist, from Pécs, Hungary. Eötvös studied with Roland Zimmer and Franz Just at the Hochschule für Musik "Franz Liszt", Weimar. He won several international competitions between 1985 and 1988. He has since toured extensively through Europe, including concerts in Austria, Bohemia, Germany, Greece, Lithuania, Romania, Sweden, and Slovakia. Eötvös is credited with the transcription and first ever recording of the Goldberg Variations in the original key, previously considered a most daunting cross-over from Bach's keyboard works.

Since the Goldbergs, Eötvös has recorded the Art of the Fugue for two eight-string guitars, in addition to transcribing many lute-works of Bach. The Goldbergs and Art of Fugue along with two volumes of Chopin's piano works and Brahms' Hungarian Dances, have helped to expand the repertoire of the classical guitar.

Eötvös has taught numerous master classes, and has often been a member of international juries at guitar competitions. He is the artistic director of the International Guitar Festivals of both Esztergom and Balatonfüred (Hungary).

He has been a teacher at the Franz Liszt Academy of Music in Budapest since 2002 and he was the first in Hungary to establish a guitar faculty at a university (music academy) level.

In 2002 he was given the Artisjus Prize for the introduction and popularization of contemporary Hungarian musical pieces and he was awarded with the Franz Liszt Prize in 2004 in recognition of his work.

Eötvös is also an accomplished composer. His compositions, which are written on the guitar and other instruments as well, are also published, such as the Willow Variations (Editions Orphée, Columbus Ohio 1991), the Five Aphorisms (Trekel Verlag, Hamburg 1997) and the Featherlets (Trekel Verlag, Hamburg 2000).
