= Caroline von Keyserling =

German painter (1727–1791)

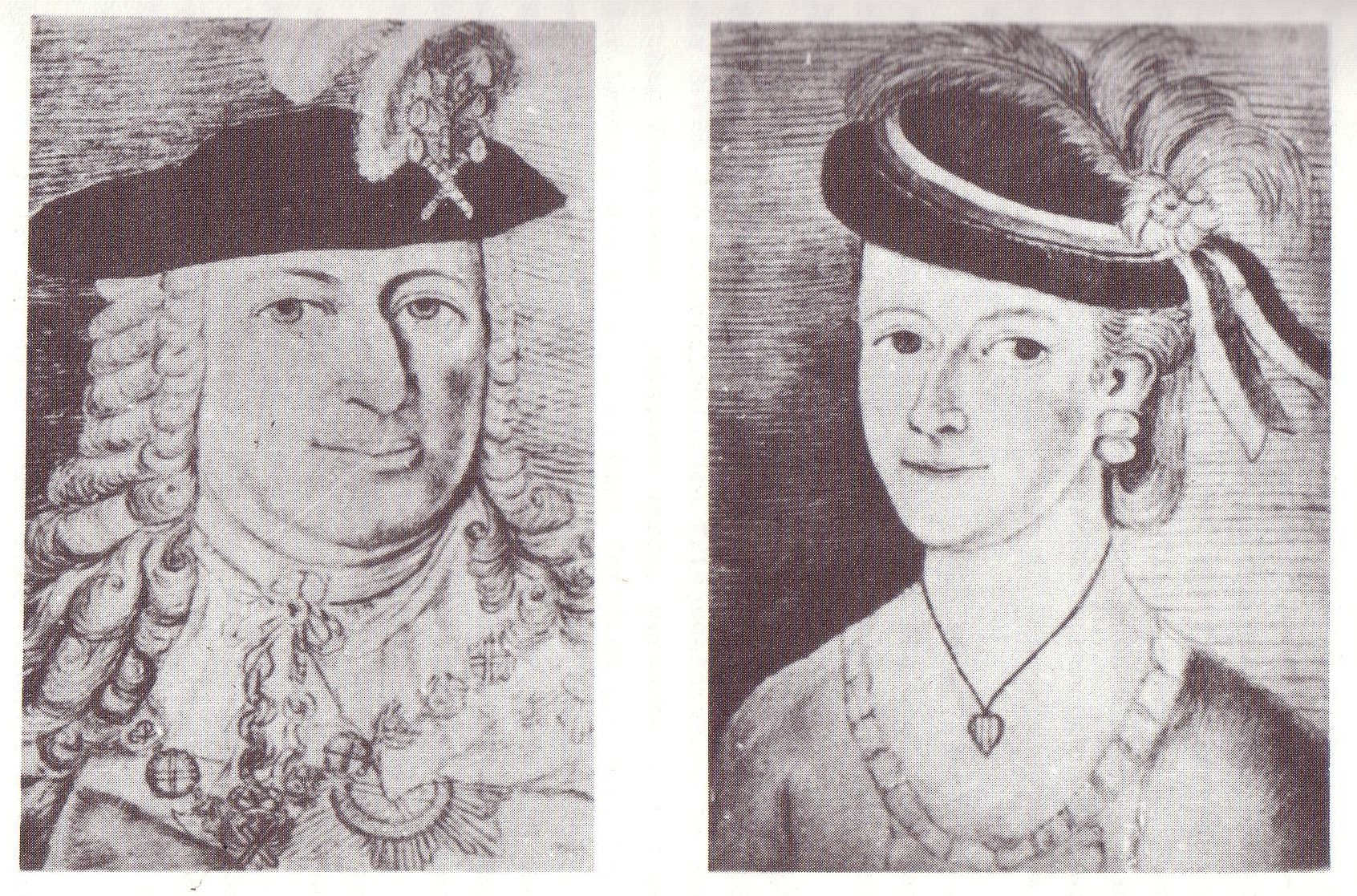
Drawings after oil paintings of Count Heinrich von Keyserling and Countess Caroline Amalie von Keyserling by an unknown painter (Königsberg, 1925)

Countess Charlotte Caroline Amalie von Keyserling (1727–1791) was an Honorary Member of the Prussian Academy of Arts in Berlin.

== Early life and family ==
She was the daughter of Carl Ludwig from the princely House of Waldburg and Countess Sophie Charlotte of Wylich and Lottum. In 1744, she married Count Gebhardt Johann von Keyserling. In 1763, she married the nephew of her late spouse, Count Heinrich Christian von Keyserling, the only son and heir of Count Herman Karl von Keyserling.

== Career ==
From 1755, she held a literary salon in her residence, the Schliebensche Palace on the Vorderroßgarten in Königsberg, which became a culture center of East Prussia. Among her guests were Immanuel Kant, Johann Georg Hamann, Theodor Gottlieb von Hippel, philosopher and political scientist Kraus, Professor history and poetry Mangelsdorf, the war and Domänenrat Scheffner; it was also an aristocratic center, among the guests of that category being the Prince of Hesse-Kassel, the Landgrave of Hesse-Darmstadt, the Russian Grand Duke Paul Petrovich and the future King Frederick William II of Prussia. At her receptions, theater and concerts were performed.

She is described as a talented dilettante artist: she painted portraits, scuppered busts, and played several musical instruments. She was an educated autodidact and highly interested in the sciences. From the 1750s onward, she wrote and published various translations, writings and essays in scientific subjects. She was known to be active in this regard, but her works were published anonymously.
