= French overture =

Musical form from the Baroque period

Le Bourgeois gentilhomme – Ouverture
Composed by Jean-Baptiste Lully (1670), performed by the Advent Chamber Orchestra

Suite 2 – Ouverture
Composed by Georg Muffat, performed by the Advent Chamber Orchestra

Cello Suite 5, BWV 1011 – Prelude
Composed by Johann Sebastian Bach, performed on a viola by Elias Goldstein

Messiah – Overture
Composed by George Frideric Handel, conducted by Hermann Scherchen

Concert Suite in D major for orchestra and viola da gamba, TWV 55:D6 – Overture
Composed by Georg Philipp Telemann, performed by the Advent Chamber Orchestra with cellist Stephen Balderston

The French overture is a musical form widely used in the Baroque period. Its basic formal division is into two parts, which are usually enclosed by double bars and repeat signs. They are complementary in style (slow in dotted rhythms and fast in fugal style), and the first ends with a half-cadence (i.e., on a dominant harmony) that requires an answering structure with a tonic ending. The second section often but not always ends with a brief recollection of the first, sometimes even repeating some of its melodic content.

The form is first encountered in Jean-Baptiste Lully's ballet overtures from the 1650s. Later examples can be found as the opening movement of each of Johann Sebastian Bach's orchestral suites, Partita in D major, BWV 828, C minor Cello Suite, BWV 1011, and as an opening to many operas, oratorios, and some concerti grossi by George Frideric Handel (including Messiah and Giulio Cesare). The 16th of Bach's Goldberg Variations is a miniature French overture.

The French overture should not be confused with the Italian overture, a three-part quick-slow-quick structure.
