= Hermann Karl von Keyserling =

Russian diplomat (1695–1764)

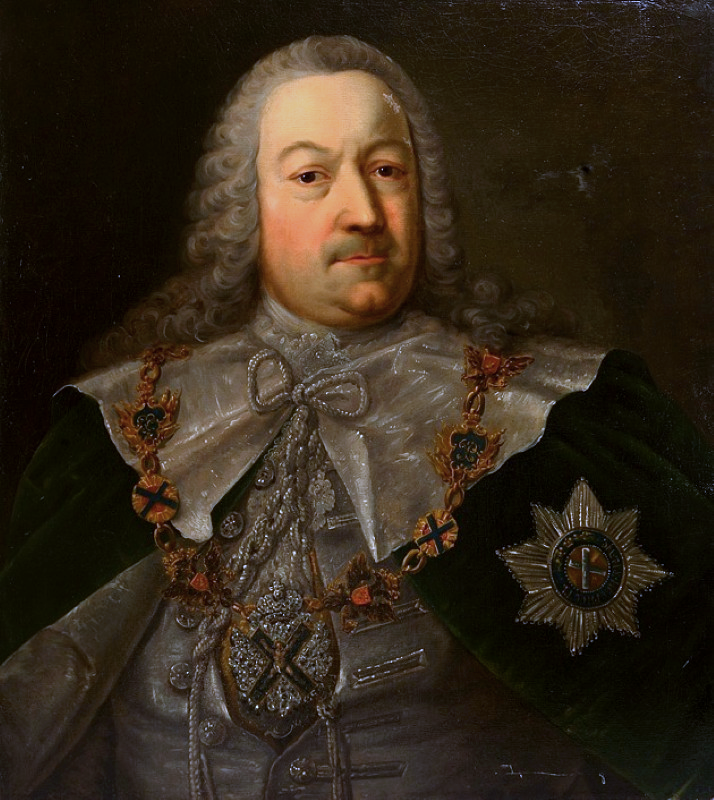
- Portrait by Michael Christoph Hagelgans
- Born: 1695; Blīdene manor, Duchy of Courland and Semigallia
- Died: 30 September 1764 (aged 68–69); Warsaw, Polish–Lithuanian Commonwealth
- Father: Otto Ernst von Keyserling
- Mother: Anna Sibilla von Manteuffel-Szoege

Count Hermann Karl von Keyserling (Russian: Герман Карл фон Кейзерлинг, romanized: German Karl fon Keyzerling; 1697 – 30 September 1764) was a Russian diplomat from the Keyserlingk family of Baltic German nobility based in the Duchy of Courland and Semigallia.

== Life ==
In 1733, the nobility of Courland sent Keyserling to Saint Petersburg in order to inform Ernst Johann von Biron that he had been elected Duke of Courland. Biron was so pleased with the news that he had Keyserlingk appointed President of the Saint Petersburg Academy of Sciences.

A year later, Keyserling was appointed Ambassador of the Russian Empire at the court of August III in Dresden and Warsaw. He kept this position until his death. As the Russian ambassador to the imperial court in Vienna he was made an imperial count in 1744.

Johann Sebastian Bach was said by his first biographer, Johann Nikolaus Forkel, to have composed the Goldberg Variations for Count Keyserling as a sleep aid. The work takes its name from Johann Gottlieb Goldberg, a musician in the service of Count Keyserling.

His son Heinrich Christian von Keyserling was the wealthiest aristocrat of Königsberg, whose palace was frequented by the likes of Immanuel Kant and Johann Gottfried Herder. His marriage to Caroline von Keyserling was childless.

Hermann Karl's daughter Anna von Medem was the great-grandmother of geologist Alexander Keyserling.

== Sources ==
- "Кейзерлинг, Герман-Карл" . Brockhaus and Efron Encyclopedic Dictionary (in Russian). 1906.
