= Goldberg Variations =

Keyboard work by Johann Sebastian Bach

Goldberg-Variationen Goldberg Variations
- BWV 988
- by J. S. Bach
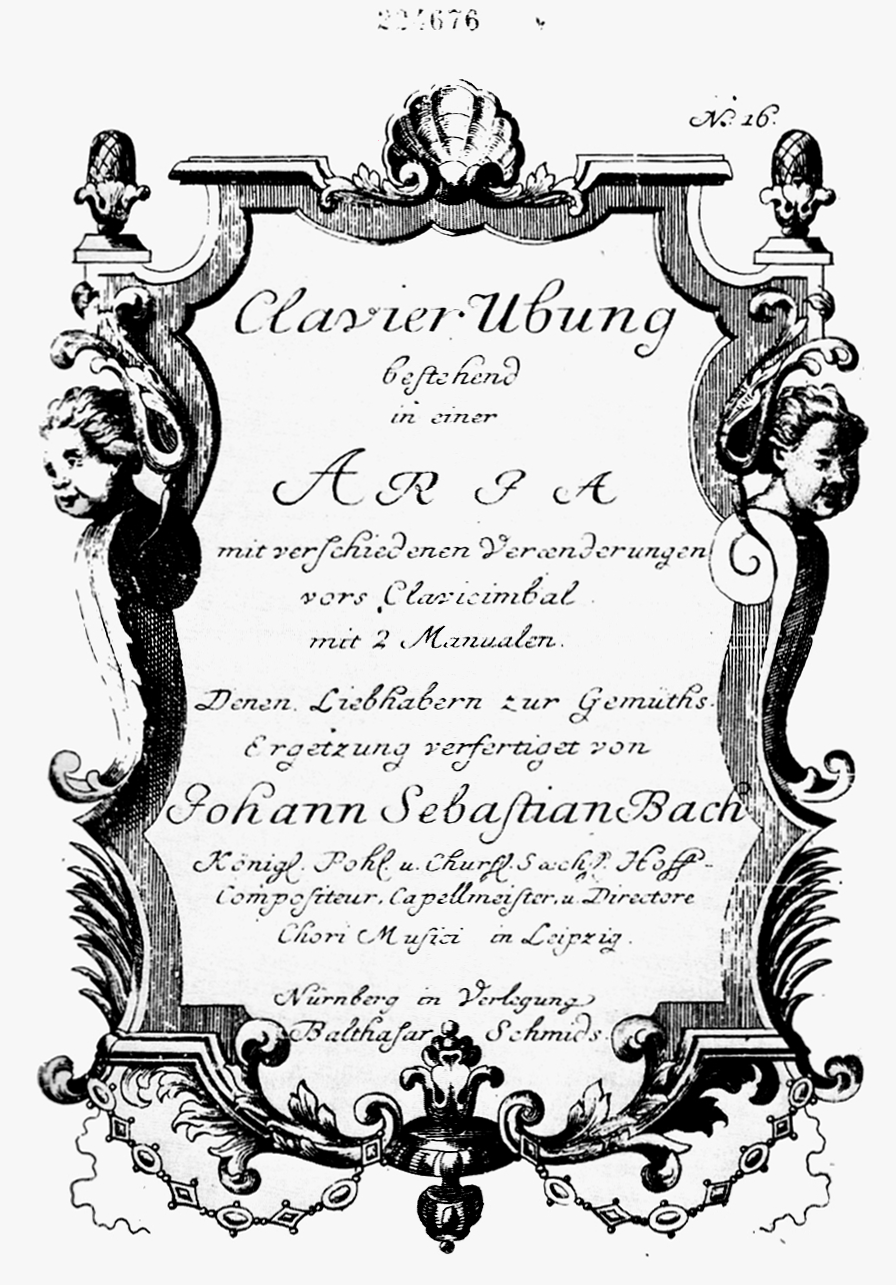
- Cover page of the first edition
- Key: G major
- Dedication: Hermann Karl von Keyserling
- Published: 1741, Nuremberg
- Publisher: Balthasar Schmid
- Movements: Aria + 30 variations

The Goldberg Variations (German: Goldberg-Variationen), BWV 988, is a musical composition for keyboard by Johann Sebastian Bach, consisting of an aria and a set of thirty variations. First published in 1741, it is named after Johann Gottlieb Goldberg, who may also have been the first performer of the work.

== Composition ==
The story of how the variations came to be composed comes from an early biography of Bach by Johann Nikolaus Forkel:

[For this work] we have to thank the instigation of the former Russian ambassador to the electoral court of Saxony, Count Kaiserling, who often stopped in Leipzig and brought there with him the aforementioned Goldberg, in order to have him given musical instruction by Bach. The Count was often ill and had sleepless nights. At such times, Goldberg, who lived in his house, had to spend the night in an antechamber, so as to play for him during his insomnia. ... Once the Count mentioned in Bach's presence that he would like to have some clavier pieces for Goldberg, which should be of such a smooth and somewhat lively character that he might be a little cheered up by them in his sleepless nights. Bach thought himself best able to fulfill this wish by means of Variations, the writing of which he had until then considered an ungrateful task on account of the repeatedly similar harmonic foundation. But since at this time all his works were already models of art, such also these variations became under his hand. Yet he produced only a single work of this kind. Thereafter the Count always called them his variations. He never tired of them, and for a long time sleepless nights meant: "Dear Goldberg, do play me one of my variations." Bach was perhaps never so rewarded for one of his works as for this. The Count presented him with a golden goblet filled with 100 Louis d'or. Nevertheless, even had the gift been a thousand times larger, their artistic value would not yet have been paid for.

Forkel wrote his biography in 1802, more than 60 years after the events related, and its accuracy has been questioned. The lack of dedication on the title page also makes the tale of the commission unlikely. Goldberg's age at the time of publication (14 years) has also been cited as grounds for doubting Forkel's tale, although it must be said that he was known to be an accomplished keyboardist and sight-reader. Williams (2001) contends that the Forkel story is entirely spurious.

Arnold Schering has suggested that the aria on which the variations are based was not written by Bach. More recent scholarly literature (such as the edition by Christoph Wolff) suggests that there is no basis for such doubts.

== Publication ==
Aria to Variation 9

Variations 10 to 22

Variations 23 to Aria Da Capo
Performed by David Ezra Okonşar

Rather unusually for Bach's works, the Goldberg Variations were published in his own lifetime, in 1741. The publisher was Bach's friend Balthasar Schmid of Nuremberg. Schmid printed the work by making engraved copper plates (rather than using movable type); thus the notes of the first edition are in Schmid's own handwriting.

The title page, shown in the figure above, reads in German:

Clavier Ubung / bestehend / in einer ARIA / mit verschiedenen Verænderungen / vors Clavicimbal / mit 2 Manualen. / Denen Liebhabern zur Gemüths- / Ergetzung verfertiget von / Johann Sebastian Bach / Königl. Pohl. u. Churfl. Sæchs. Hoff- / Compositeur, Capellmeister, u. Directore / Chori Musici in Leipzig. / Nürnberg in Verlegung / Balthasar Schmids	Keyboard exercise, consisting of an ARIA with diverse variations for harpsichord with two manuals. Composed for connoisseurs, for the refreshment of their spirits, by Johann Sebastian Bach, composer for the royal court of Poland and the Electoral court of Saxony, Kapellmeister and Director of Choral Music in Leipzig. Nuremberg, Balthasar Schmid, publisher.

The term "Clavier Ubung" (modern spelling "Klavierübung") had been assigned by Bach to some of his previous keyboard works. Klavierübung part 1 was the six partitas, part 2 the Italian Concerto and French Overture, and part 3 a series of chorale preludes for organ framed by a prelude and fugue in E♭ major. Although Bach also called his variations "Klavierübung", he did not specifically designate them as the fourth in this series.

Nineteen copies of the first edition survive. Of these, the most valuable is the Handexemplar (Bach's personal copy of the published score), discovered in 1974 in Strasbourg by the French musicologist Olivier Alain and now kept in the Bibliothèque nationale de France, Paris. This copy includes printing corrections made by the composer and additional music in the form of fourteen canons on the Goldberg ground (see below). The nineteen printed copies provide virtually the only information available to modern editors trying to reconstruct Bach's intent, as the autograph (handwritten) score has not survived. A handwritten copy of just the aria is found in the 1725 Notebook for Anna Magdalena Bach. Christoph Wolff suggests on the basis of handwriting evidence that Anna Magdalena copied the aria from the autograph score around 1740; it appears on two pages previously left blank.

== Instrumentation ==
On the title page, Bach specified that the work was intended for harpsichord. It is widely performed on this instrument today, though there are also a great number of performances on the piano. The piano was rare in Bach's day and there is no indication that Bach would have either approved or disapproved of performing the variations on this instrument.

Bach's specification is, more precisely, a two-manual harpsichord, and he indicated in the score which variations ought to be played using one hand on each manual: Variations 8, 11, 13, 14, 17, 20, 23, 25, 26, 27 and 28 are specified for two manuals, while variations 5, 7 and 29 are specified as playable with either one or two. With greater difficulty, the work can nevertheless be played on a single-manual harpsichord or piano.

== Form ==
After a statement of the aria at the beginning of the piece, there are thirty variations. The variations do not follow the melody of the aria, but rather use its bass line and chord progression. The bass line is notated by harpsichordist and musicologist Ralph Kirkpatrick in his performing edition as follows.

The digits above the notes indicate the specified chord in the system of figured bass; where digits are separated by comma (stacked vertically in a proper figured bass), they indicate seventh chords in first inversion.

Every third variation in the series of 30 is a canon, following an ascending pattern. Thus, variation 3 is a canon at the unison, variation 6 is a canon at the second (the second entry begins the interval of a second above the first), variation 9 is a canon at the third, and so on until variation 27, which is a canon at the ninth. The final variation, instead of being the expected canon in the tenth, is a quodlibet, discussed below.

As Kirkpatrick has pointed out, the variations that intervene between the canons are also arranged in a pattern. If we leave aside the initial and final material of the work (specifically, the Aria, the first two variations, the Quodlibet, and the aria da capo), the remaining material is arranged as follows. The variations found just after each canon are genre pieces of various types, among them three Baroque dances (4, 7, 19); a fughetta (10); a French overture (16); two ornate arias for the right hand (13, 25); and others (22, 28). The variations located two after each canon (5, 8, 11, 14, 17, 20, 23, 26, and 29) are what Kirkpatrick calls "arabesques"; they are variations in lively tempo with a great deal of hand-crossing. This ternary pattern—canon, genre piece, arabesque—is repeated a total of nine times, until the Quodlibet breaks the cycle.

All the variations are in G major, apart from variations 15, 21, and 25, which are in G minor.

At the end of the thirty variations, Bach writes Aria da Capo e fine, meaning that the performer is to return to the beginning ("da capo") and play the aria again before concluding.

=== Aria ===
The aria is a sarabande in 3/4 time, and features a heavily ornamented melody:

Aria
Performed by Kimiko Douglass-Ishizaka on piano

The French style of ornamentation suggests that the ornaments are supposed to be parts of the melody; however, some performers (for example Wilhelm Kempff on piano) omit some or all ornaments and present the aria unadorned.

Williams opines that this is not the theme at all, but actually the first variation (a view emphasising the idea of the work as a chaconne rather than a piece in true variation form).

=== Variatio 1. a 1 Clav. ===
Variatio 1. a 1 Clav.
Performed by Kimiko Douglass-Ishizaka on piano, also other variations

This sprightly variation contrasts markedly with the slow, contemplative mood of the aria. The rhythm in the right hand forces the emphasis on the second beat, giving rise to syncopation from bars 1 to 7. Hands cross at bar 13 from the upper register to the lower, bringing back this syncopation for another two bars. In the first two bars of the B part, the rhythm mirrors that of the beginning of the A part, but after this a different idea is introduced.

Williams sees this as a sort of polonaise. The characteristic rhythm in the left hand is also found in Bach's Partita No. 3 for solo violin, in the A♭ major prelude from the first book of The Well-Tempered Clavier, and in the D minor prelude of the second book. Heinz Niemüller also mentions the polonaise character of this variation.

=== Variatio 2. a 1 Clav. ===
Variatio 2. a 1 Clav.

This is a simple three-part contrapuntal piece in 2/4 time, two voices engage in constant motivic interplay over an incessant bass line. As such, Variation 2 can be regarded as a kind of trio sonata. Each section has an alternate ending to be played on the first and second repeat.

=== Variatio 3. Canone all'Unisono. a 1 Clav. ===
Variatio 3. a 1 Clav. Canone all'Unisuono

The first of the regular canons, this is a canon at the unison: the follower begins on the same note as the leader, a bar later. As with all canons of the Goldberg Variations (except the 27th variation, canon at the ninth), there is a supporting bass line. The time signature of 12/8 and the many sets of triplets suggest a kind of a simple dance.

=== Variatio 4. a 1 Clav. ===
Variatio 4. a 1 Clav.

Like the passepied, a Baroque dance movement, this variation is in 3/8 time with a preponderance of quaver rhythms. Bach uses close but not exact imitation: the musical pattern in one part reappears a bar later in another (sometimes inverted).

Each repeated section has alternate endings for the first or second time.

=== Variatio 5. a 1 ô vero 2 Clav. ===
Variatio 5. a 1 ô vero 2 Clav.

This is the first of the hand-crossing, two-part variations; the title means "for one or two manuals". The movement is written in 3/4 time. A rapid melodic line predominantly in sixteenth notes is accompanied by another melody with longer note values, which features very wide leaps:

The Italian type of hand-crossing such as is frequently found in the sonatas of Scarlatti is employed here, with one hand constantly moving back and forth between high and low registers while the other hand stays in the middle of the keyboard, playing the fast passages.

=== Variatio 6. Canone alla Seconda. a 1 Clav. ===
Variatio 6. a 1 Clav. Canone alla Seconda

The sixth variation is a canon at the second: the follower starts a major second higher than the leader. The piece is based on a descending scale and is in 3/8 time. Kirkpatrick describes this piece as having "an almost nostalgic tenderness". Each section has an alternate ending to be played on the first and second repeat.

=== Variatio 7. a 1 ô vero 2 Clav. al tempo di Giga ===
Variatio 7. a 1 ô vero 2 Clav. al tempo di Giga

The variation is in 6/8 meter, suggesting several possible Baroque dances. In 1974, when scholars discovered Bach's own copy of the first printing of the Goldberg Variations, they noted that over this variation Bach had added the heading al tempo di Giga. But the implications of this discovery for modern performance have turned out to be less clear than was at first assumed. In his book The Keyboard Music of J. S. Bach the scholar and keyboardist David Schulenberg notes that the discovery "surprised twentieth-century commentators who supposed gigues were always fast and fleeting." However, "despite the Italian terminology [giga], this is a [less fleet] French gigue." Indeed, he notes, the dotted rhythmic pattern of this variation (pictured) is very similar to that of the gigue from Bach's second French suite and the gigue of the French Overture. This kind of gigue is known as a "Canary", based on the rhythm of a dance which originated from the Canary islands.

He concludes, "It need not go quickly." Moreover, Schulenberg adds that the "numerous short trills and appoggiaturas" preclude too fast a tempo.

The pianist Angela Hewitt, in the liner notes to her 1999 Hyperion recording, argues that by adding the al tempo di giga notation, Bach was trying to caution against taking too slow a tempo, and thus turning the dance into a forlane or siciliano. She does however argue, like Schulenberg, that it is a French gigue, not an Italian giga and does play it at an unhurried tempo.

=== Variatio 8. a 2 Clav. ===
Variatio 8. a 2 Clav.

This is another two-part hand-crossing variation, in 3/4 time. The French style of hand-crossing such as is found in the clavier works of François Couperin is employed, with both hands playing at the same part of the keyboard, one above the other. This is relatively easy to perform on a two-manual harpsichord, but quite difficult to do on a piano.

Most bars feature either a distinctive pattern of eleven sixteenth notes and a sixteenth rest, or ten sixteenth notes and a single eighth note. Large leaps in the melody occur. Both sections end with descending passages in thirty-second notes.

=== Variatio 9. Canone alla Terza. a 1 Clav. ===
Variatio 9. Canone alla Terza. a 1 Clav.

This is a canon at the third, in 4/4 time. The supporting bass line is slightly more active than in the previous canons.

=== Variatio 10. Fughetta. a 1 Clav. ===
Variation 10 is a four-voice fughetta, with a four-bar subject heavily decorated with ornaments and somewhat reminiscent of the opening aria's melody.

The exposition takes up the whole first section of this variation (pictured). First the subject is stated in the bass, starting on the G below middle C. The answer (in the tenor) enters in bar 5, but it's a tonal answer, so some of the intervals are altered. The soprano voice enters in bar 9, but only keeps the first two bars of the subject intact, changing the rest. The final entry occurs in the alto in bar 13. There is no regular counter-subject in this fugue.

Variatio 10 a 1 Clav. Fughetta

The second section develops using the same thematic material with slight changes. It resembles a counter-exposition: the voices enter one by one, all begin by stating the subject (sometimes a bit altered, like in the first section). The section begins with the subject heard once again, in the soprano voice, accompanied by an active bass line, making the bass part the only exception since it doesn't pronounce the subject until bar 25.

=== Variatio 11. a 2 Clav. ===
Variatio 11 a 2 Clav.

This is a virtuosic two-part toccata in 12/16 time. Specified for two manuals, it is largely made up of various scale passages, arpeggios and trills, and features much hand-crossing of different kinds.

=== Variatio 12. a 1 Clav. Canone alla Quarta in moto contrario ===
Variatio 12. Canone alla Quarta

This is a canon at the fourth in 3/4 time, of the inverted variety: the follower enters in the second bar in contrary motion to the leader.

In the first section, the left hand accompanies with a bass line written out in repeated quarter notes, in bars 1, 2, 3, 5, 6, and 7. This repeated note motif also appears in the first bar of the second section (bar 17, two Ds and a C), and, slightly altered, in bars 22 and 23. In the second section, Bach changes the mood slightly by introducing a few appoggiaturas (bars 19 and 20) and trills (bars 29–30).

=== Variatio 13. a 2 Clav. ===
Variatio 13 a 2 Clav.

This variation is a slow, gentle and richly decorated sarabande in 3/4 time. Most of the melody is written out using thirty-second notes, and ornamented with a few appoggiaturas (more frequent in the second section) and a few mordents. Throughout the piece, the melody is in one voice, and in bars 16 and 24 an interesting effect is produced by the use of an additional voice. Here are bars 15 and 16, the ending of the first section (bar 24 exhibits a similar pattern):

=== Variatio 14. a 2 Clav. ===
Variatio 14. a 2 Clav.

This is a rapid two-part hand-crossing toccata in 3/4 time, with many trills and other ornamentation. It is specified for two manuals and features large jumps between registers. Both features (ornaments and leaps in the melody) are apparent from the first bar: the piece begins with a transition from the G two octaves below middle C, with a lower mordent, to the G two octaves above it with a trill with initial turn.

Bach uses a loose inversion motif between the first half and the second half of this variation, "recycling" rhythmic and melodic material, passing material that was in the right hand to the left hand, and loosely (selectively) inverting it.

Contrasting it with Variation 15, Glenn Gould described this variation as "certainly one of the giddiest bits of neo-Scarlatti-ism imaginable."

=== Variatio 15. Canone alla Quinta. a 1 Clav.: Andante ===
Variatio 15 a 1 Clav. Canone alla Quinta

This is a canon at the fifth in 2/4 time. Like Variation 12, it is in contrary motion with the leader appearing inverted in the second bar. This is the first of the three variations in G minor, and its melancholic mood contrasts sharply with the playfulness of the previous variation. Pianist Angela Hewitt notes that there is "a wonderful effect at the very end [of this variation]: the hands move away from each other, with the right suspended in mid-air on an open fifth. This gradual fade, leaving us in awe but ready for more, is a fitting end to the first half of the piece."

Glenn Gould said of this variation, "It's the most severe and rigorous and beautiful canon ... the most severe and beautiful that I know, the canon in inversion at the fifth. It's a piece so moving, so anguished—and so uplifting at the same time—that it would not be in any way out of place in the St. Matthew's Passion; matter of fact, I've always thought of Variation 15 as the perfect Good Friday spell."

=== Variatio 16. Ouverture. a 1 Clav. ===
Variatio 16 a 1 Clav. Ouverture

The entire set of variations can be seen as being divided into two halves, clearly marked by this grand French overture, commencing with particularly emphatic opening and closing chords. It consists of a slow prelude with dotted rhythms with a following fugue-like contrapuntal section. Here Bach follows his custom of beginning the second half of a major collection with a movement in French style, as with the earlier Clavier-Übung volumes, in both parts of the Well-Tempered Clavier, in the Musical Offering (#4 of the numbered canons) and in the early version of the Art of Fugue (#7 of P 200).

=== Variatio 17. a 2 Clav. ===
Variatio 17 a 2 Clav.

This variation is another two-part virtuosic toccata. Peter Williams sees echoes of Antonio Vivaldi and Domenico Scarlatti here. Specified for two manuals, the piece features hand-crossing. It is in 3/4 time and usually played at a moderately fast tempo. Rosalyn Tureck is one of the very few performers who recorded slow interpretations of the piece. In making his 1981 re-recording of the Goldberg Variations, Glenn Gould considered playing this variation at a slower tempo, in keeping with the tempo of the preceding variation (Variation 16), but ultimately decided not to because "Variation 17 is one of those rather skittish, slightly empty-headed collections of scales and arpeggios which Bach indulged when he wasn't writing sober and proper things like fugues and canons, and it just seemed to me that there wasn't enough substance to it to warrant such a methodical, deliberate, Germanic tempo."

=== Variatio 18. Canone alla Sesta. a 1 Clav. ===
Variatio 18 a 1 Clav. Canone alla Sexta

This is a canon at the sixth in 2/2 time. The canonic interplay in the upper voices features many suspensions. Commenting on the structure of the canons of the Goldberg Variations, Glenn Gould cited this variation as the extreme example of "deliberate duality of motivic emphasis ... the canonic voices are called upon to sustain the passacaille role which is capriciously abandoned by the bass." Nicholas Kenyon calls Variation 18 "an imperious, totally confident movement which must be among the most supremely logical pieces of music ever written, with the strict imitation to the half-bar providing ideal impetus and a sense of climax."

=== Variatio 19. a 1 Clav. ===
Variatio 19. a 1 Clav.

This is a dance-like three-part variation in 3/8 time. The same sixteenth note figuration is continuously employed and variously exchanged between each of the three voices. This variation incorporates the rhythmic model of variation 13 (complementary exchange of quarter and sixteenth notes) with variations 1 and 2 (syncopations).

=== Variatio 20. a 2 Clav. ===
Variatio 20 a 2 Clav.

This variation is a virtuosic two-part toccata in 3/4 time. Specified for two manuals, it involves rapid hand-crossing. The piece consists mostly of variations on the texture introduced during its first eight bars, where one hand plays a string of eighth notes and the other accompanies by plucking sixteenth notes after each eighth note. To demonstrate this, here are the first two bars of the first section:

=== Variatio 21. Canone alla Settima ===
Variatio 21 Canone alla Settima

The second of the three minor key variations, variation 21 has a tone that is somber or even tragic, which contrasts starkly with variation 20. The bass line here is one of the most eloquent found in the variations, to which Bach adds chromatic intervals that provide tonal shadings. This variation is a canon at the seventh in 4/4 time; Kenneth Gilbert sees it as an allemande despite the lack of anacrusis. The bass line begins the piece with a low note, proceeds to a slow lament bass and only picks up the pace of the canonic voices in bar 3:

A similar pattern, only a bit more lively, occurs in the bass line in the beginning of the second section, which begins with the opening motif inverted.

=== Variatio 22. a 1 Clav. alla breve ===
Variatio 22 a 1 Clav.

This variation features four-part writing with many imitative passages and its development in all voices but the bass is much like that of a fugue. The only specified ornament is a trill which is performed on a whole note and which lasts for two bars (11 and 12).

The ground bass on which the entire set of variations is built is heard perhaps most explicitly in this variation (as well as in the Quodlibet) due to the simplicity of the bass voice.

=== Variatio 23. a 2 Clav. ===
Variatio 23 a 2 Clav.

Another lively two-part virtuosic variation for two manuals, in 3/4 time. It begins with the hands chasing one another, as it were: the melodic line, initiated in the left hand with a sharp striking of the G above middle C, and then sliding down from the B one octave above to the F, is offset by the right hand, imitating the left at the same pitch, but a quaver late, for the first three bars, ending with a small flourish in the fourth:

This pattern is repeated during bars 5–8, only with the left hand imitating the right one, and the scales are ascending, not descending. We then alternate between hands in short bursts written out in short note values until the last three bars of the first section. The second section starts with this similar alternation in short bursts again, then leads to a dramatic section of alternating thirds between hands.

=== Variatio 24. Canone all'Ottava. a 1 Clav. ===
Variatio 24 a 1 Clav. Canone all Ottava

This variation is a canon at the octave, in 9/8 time. The leader is answered both an octave below and an octave above; it is the only canon of the variations in which the leader alternates between voices in the middle of a section.

=== Variatio 25. a 2 Clav.: Adagio ===
Variatio 25. a 2 Clav.

Variation 25 is the third and last variation in G minor; it is marked adagio in Bach's own copy and is in 3/4 time. The melody is written out predominantly in sixteenth and thirty-second notes, with many chromaticisms. This variation generally lasts longer than any other piece of the set.

Wanda Landowska famously described this variation as "the black pearl" of the Goldberg Variations. Williams writes that "the beauty and dark passion of this variation make it unquestionably the emotional high point of the work", and Glenn Gould said that "the appearance of this wistful, weary cantilena is a master-stroke of psychology." In an interview with Gould, Tim Page described this variation as having an "extraordinary chromatic texture"; Gould agreed: "I don't think there's been a richer lode of enharmonic relationships any place between Gesualdo and Wagner."

=== Variatio 26. a 2 Clav. ===
Variatio 26 a 2 Clav

In sharp contrast with the introspective and passionate nature of the previous variation, this piece is another virtuosic two-part toccata, joyous and fast-paced. Underneath the rapid arabesques, this variation is basically a sarabande. Two time signatures are used, 18/16 for the incessant melody written in sixteenth notes and 3/4 for the accompaniment in quarter and eighth notes; during the last five bars, both hands play in 18/16.

=== Variatio 27. Canone alla Nona. a 2 Clav. ===
Variatio 27 a 2 Clav

Variation 27 is the last canon of the piece, at the ninth and in 6/8 time. This is the only canon where two manuals are specified not due to hand-crossing difficulties, and the only pure canon of the work, because it does not have a bass line.

=== Variatio 28. a 2 Clav. ===
Variatio 28 a 2 Clav.

This variation is a two-part toccata in 3/4 time that employs a great deal of hand crossing. Trills are written out using thirty-second notes and are present in most of the bars. The piece begins with a pattern in which each hand successively picks out a melodic line while also playing trills. Following this is a section with both hands playing in contrary motion in a melodic contour marked by sixteenth notes (bars 9–12). The end of the first section features trills again, in both hands now and mirroring one another:

The second section starts and closes with the contrary motion idea seen in bars 9–12. Most of the closing bars feature trills in one or both hands.

=== Variatio 29. a 1 ô vero 2 Clav. ===
Variatio 29 a 1 ovvero 2 Clav.

This variation consists mostly of heavy chords alternating with sections of brilliant arpeggios shared between the hands. It is in 3/4 time. A rather grand variation, it adds an air of resolution after the lofty brilliance of the previous variation. Glenn Gould states that variations 28 and 29 present the only case of "motivic collaboration or extension between successive variations."

=== Variatio 30. a 1 Clav. Quodlibet ===
Variatio 30. Quodlibet. a 1 Clav.

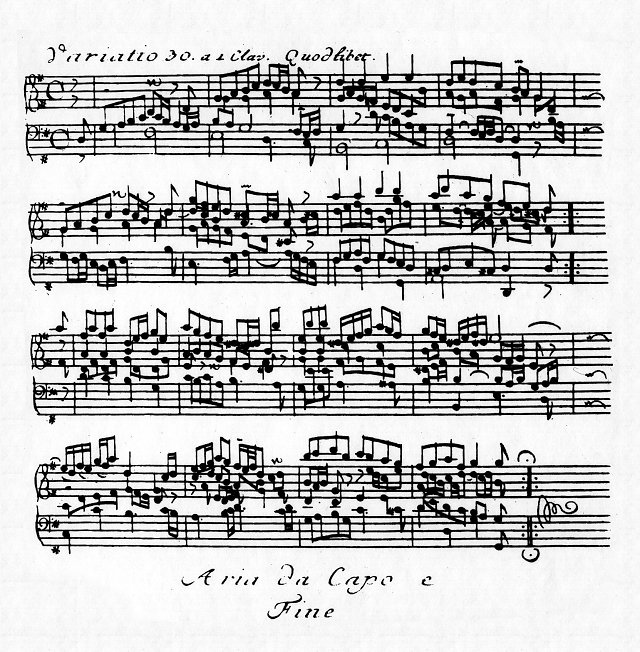
The Quodlibet as it appears in the first edition

The final variation is titled after the quodlibet tradition, in which multiple popular songs are played at once or in succession. According to Forkel, the many musicians of the Bach family practiced this tradition at gatherings:

As soon as they were assembled a chorale was first struck up. From this devout beginning they proceeded to jokes which were frequently in strong contrast. That is, they then sang popular songs partly of comic and also partly of indecent content, all mixed together on the spur of the moment. ... This kind of improvised harmonizing they called a Quodlibet, and not only could laugh over it quite whole-heartedly themselves, but also aroused just as hearty and irresistible laughter in all who heard them.

Though Bach never noted the sources of Variation 30, Forkel's anecdote led to the belief that it is composed from German Volkslied melodies, as if to evoke the Bach gatherings.

Since folk tunes commonly shared melodies, music alone does not identify the songs intended. For example, part of Variation 30 traces back to the melody of the Italian Bergamask dance, which not only gave rise to compositions by many musicians (such as Dieterich Buxtehude, under the title of La Capricciosa, for his thirty-two partite in G major, BuxWV 250), but is even sung to various words in regions such as Iceland today.

A handwritten note found in a collector's copy of the Clavier Ubung claims that Bach's student, Johann Christian Kittel, identified two folk tunes making up Variation 30 by their first lines. Siegfried Dehn of the Prussian royal library later appended purported full texts to this note:

- Ich bin solang nicht bei dir g'west, ruck her, ruck her ("I have so long been away from you, come closer, come closer") and
- Kraut und Rüben haben mich vertrieben, hätt mein' Mutter Fleisch gekocht, wär ich länger blieben ("Cabbage and turnips have driven me away, had my mother cooked meat, I'd have opted to stay"), ascribed to the Bergamask theme.

Dehn's texts, though unsourced, stand as the only historical evidence for the provenance of Bach's Quodlibet and are commonly quoted. Today, the identity of "Kraut und Rüben..." is uncontroversial, since multiple versions of the text, including some explicitly set to the Bergamask theme, are preserved. In contrast, the "Ich bin solang..." text is much more obscure, and these words have not been found in any Volkslied archives.

Other bars of Variation 30 can be heard as incipits of yet more songs, though none have been identified.

=== Aria da Capo ===
Aria da Capo

A note-for-note repeat of the aria at the beginning. Williams writes that the work's "elusive beauty ... is reinforced by this return to the Aria. ... no such return can have a neutral Affekt. Its melody is made to stand out by what has gone on in the last five variations, and it is likely to appear wistful or nostalgic or subdued or resigned or sad, heard on its repeat as something coming to an end, the same notes but now final."

== Canons on the Goldberg ground, BWV 1087 ==
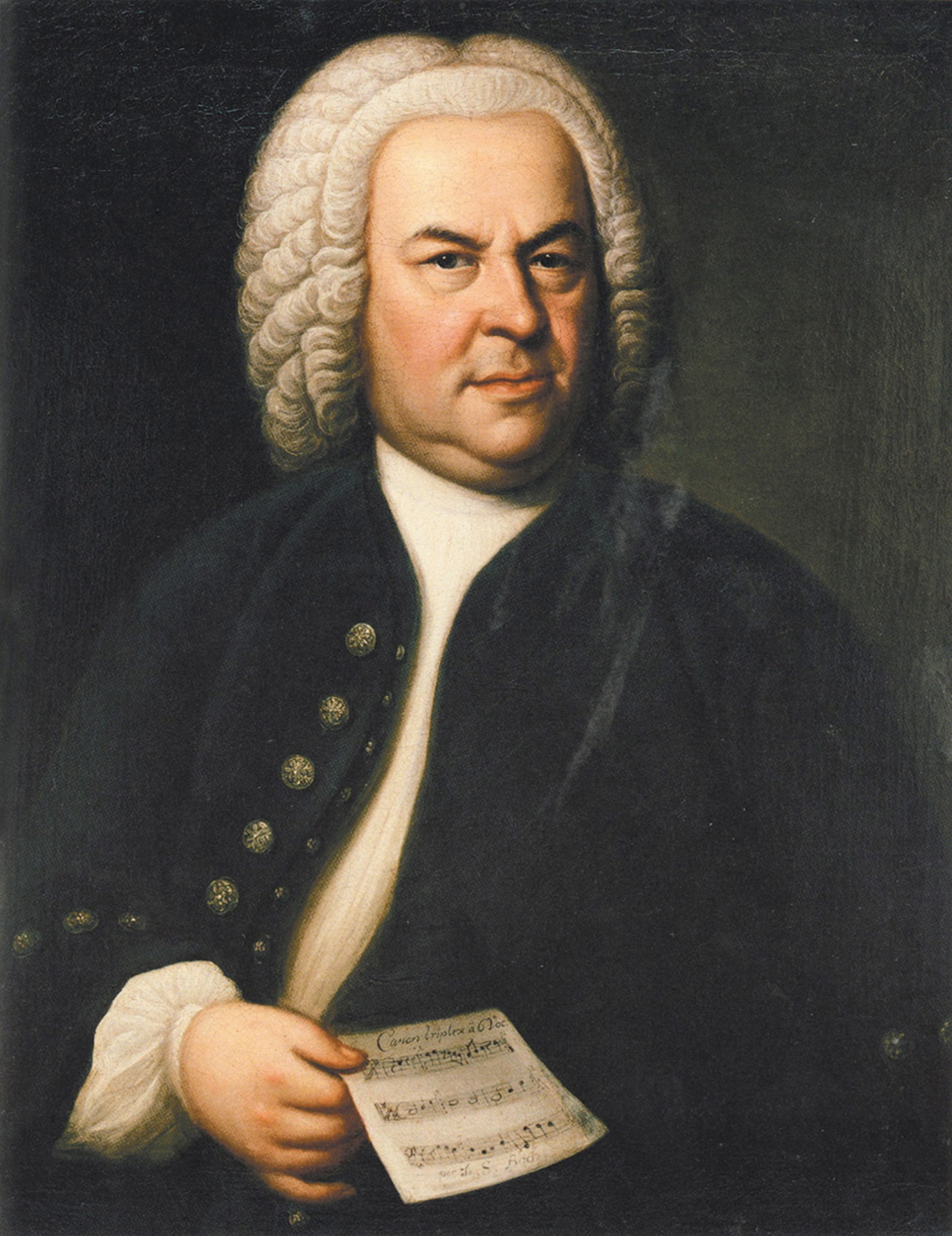
Haussmann's portrait of Bach depicts him holding the manuscript to BWV 1076, which is also the thirteenth canon in the Goldberg Canon cycle.

When Bach's personal copy of the printed edition of the Goldberg Variations (see above) was discovered in 1974, it was found to include an appendix in the form of fourteen canons built on the first eight bass notes from the aria. It is speculated that the number 14 refers to the ordinal values of the letters in the composer's name: B(2) + A(1) + C(3) + H(8) = 14. Among those canons, the eleventh and the thirteenth are first versions of BWV 1077 and BWV 1076; the latter is included in the famous portrait of Bach painted by Elias Gottlob Haussmann in 1746.

== Transcribed and popularized versions ==
The Goldberg Variations have been reworked freely by many performers, changing either the instrumentation, the notes, or both. The Italian composer Busoni prepared a greatly altered transcription for piano. According to the art critic Michael Kimmelman, "Busoni shuffled the variations, skipping some, then added his own rather voluptuous coda to create a three-movement structure; each movement has a distinct, arcing shape, and the whole becomes a more tightly organized drama than the original." Other arrangements include:

- 1883: Josef Rheinberger, transcription (tr.) for two pianos, Op. 3 (rev. Max Reger)
- 1938: Józef Koffler, tr. for orchestra / string orchestra
- 1975: Charles Ramirez and Helen Kalamuniak, tr. for two guitars
- 1982: Lynn Harting-Ware, aria and variations 1, 2, 4, 13, 19, 9, 7, 15, 27, and 30 for guitar (in the order she plays them on her Forest Scenes album).
- 1984: Dmitry Sitkovetsky, tr. for string trio (rev. in 2009; he also made an arrangement for string orchestra in 1992)
- 1987 (year of recording): Stefan Hussong, tr. for classical accordion
- 1987: Jean Guillou, tr. for organ
- 1988: Joel Spiegelman, tr. for Kurzweil 250 Digital Synthesizer
- 1997: József Eötvös, tr. for guitar
- 2000: Jacques Loussier, arrangement (arr.) for jazz trio
- 2000: Uri Caine, arr. for various ensembles
- 2003: Karlheinz Essl, Gold.Berg.Werk, arr. for string trio and live electronics
- 2009: Catrin Finch, complete tr. for harp
- 2010: David Maslanka, tr. for saxophone quartet
- 2011: James Strauss, complete tr. for flute and harpsichord/flute and piano
- 2011: Dan Tepfer, Goldberg Variations/Variations, each original variation followed by a jazz improvisation based on that variation
- 2012: Karlheinz Essl, Gold.Berg.Werk arr. for piano, transducer and live-electronics
- 2016: Mika Pohjola, arr. for piano, harpsichord and string quartet
- 2017: Rinaldo Alessandrini and Concerto Italiano, Variations on Variations, arr. for ensemble
- 2018: Caio Facó, orchestration for chamber orchestra
- 2024: Mateusz Zubik and Marek Chołoniewski, "(A)INSOMNIA - a performance about sleep, Goldberg Variations, pink meringues and artificial intelligence" ("(A)INSOMNIA - performans o śnie, Wariacjach Goldbergowskich, różowych bezach i sztucznej inteligencji”), performance in Krakow (SILENCE Music Festival)
- 2025: Mathieu Gaulin, tr. for saxophone quartet

== Jerome Robbins ballet ==
In 1971, the New York City Ballet premiered a ballet choreographed by Jerome Robbins and danced to the entire score played on the piano.

== Editions of the score ==
- Ralph Kirkpatrick. New York/London: G. Schirmer, 1938. Contains an extensive preface by the editor and a facsimile of the original title page.
- Hans Bischoff. New York: Edwin F. Kalmus, 1947 (editorial work dates from the nineteenth century). Includes interpretive markings by the editor not indicated as such.
- Christoph Wolff. Vienna: Wiener Urtext Edition, 1996. An urtext edition, making use of the new findings (1975) resulting from the discovery of an original copy hand-corrected by the composer. Includes suggested fingerings and notes on interpretation by the harpsichordist Huguette Dreyfus.
- Reinhard Böß. München: edition Text+Kritik, 1996. Verschiedene Canones ... von J. S. Bach (BWV 1087). ISBN 3-88377-523-1 Edition of the canons in BWV 1087 only. The editor suggests a complete complement of all fourteen canons.
- Werner Schweer, 2012. The Goldberg Variations, MuseScore Edition created for the Open Goldberg Variations Project and released as public domain. Available online at MuseScore.com

== See also ==
- Goldberg Variations discography
- Goldberg Variations, a satirical play by George Tabori

== Notes ==
Sources

- Gould, Glenn and Page, Tim (2002). A State of Wonder, disc 3. Sony.
- Kirkpatrick, Ralph (1938). J.S. Bach, The Goldberg Variations, Piano or Harpsichord. Schirmer's Library of Musical Classics. Vol. 1980. New York City: G. Schirmer, Inc. ISBN 978-0-7935-2245-3.
- Schulenberg, David (2006). The Keyboard Music of J. S. Bach. New York and Oxford: Routledge. pp. 369–388. ISBN 0-415-97400-3.
- Williams, Peter (2001). Bach: The Goldberg Variations. Cambridge: Cambridge University Press. ISBN 0-521-00193-5.
- Wolff, Christoph (Summer 1976). "Bach's Handexemplar of the Goldberg Variations: A New Source". Journal of the American Musicological Society. 29 (2): 224–241. doi:10.2307/831018. JSTOR 831018.
