= Johann Gottlieb Goldberg =

German musician (1727–1756)

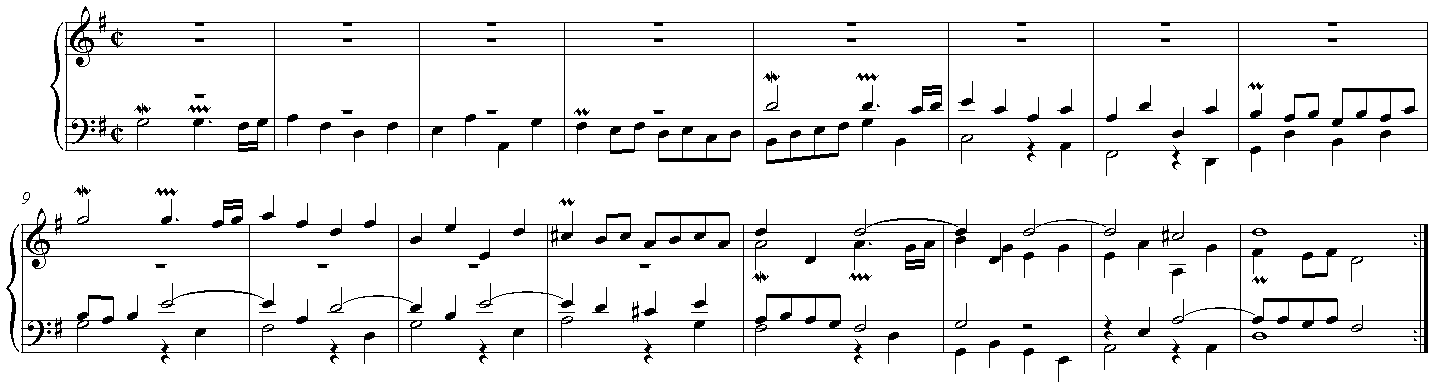
Bach Goldberg variation 10

Johann Gottlieb Goldberg (German: [ˈɡɔltbɛɐ̯k]; baptized 14 March 1727 – 13 April 1756) was a German virtuoso harpsichordist, organist, and composer of the late Baroque and early Classical period. He is best known for lending his name, as the probable original performer, to the renowned Goldberg Variations of J. S. Bach.

== Life ==
Goldberg was born in Danzig (Gdańsk), part of the Crown of Poland, and was baptized there on 14 March 1727 at St. Mary's Church. Little is known for certain about his childhood, other than that he was an exceptionally talented performer, attracting the attention of Hermann Karl von Keyserling, the Russian ambassador to Saxony, around 1737. Goldberg was reported to have studied with both Johann Sebastian and Wilhelm Friedemann Bach, Bach's eldest son, though the periods of study are not known; Goldberg may have studied with J. S. Bach as early as 1737, shortly after Keyserling recognized his talent in Danzig, and Goldberg may have studied with W. F. Bach at any time before 1745, since W. F. Bach was in Dresden throughout Keyserling's tenure there as ambassador.

The most famous part of Goldberg's life is the portion, probably in 1741, recounted by J. S. Bach's biographer Johann Nikolaus Forkel, concerning the composition of a set of variations by Bach to help the insomniac Count Keyserling pass sleepless nights. Keyserling's favorite chamber harpsichordist was the 14-year-old Goldberg, whose technical accomplishments were so spectacular that they made it possible for him to perform a work of such extraordinary difficulty. According to Forkel, writing in 1802, sixty years after the event:

...[the count] ... often stopped in Leipzig and brought there with him the aforementioned Goldberg, in order to have him given musical instruction by Bach. The count was often ill and had sleepless nights. At such times, Goldberg, who lived in his house, had to spend the night in an antechamber, so as to play for him during his insomnia. ... Once the count mentioned in Bach's presence that he would like to have some clavier pieces for Goldberg, which should be of such a smooth and somewhat lively character that he might be a little cheered up by them in his sleepless nights. Bach thought himself best able to fulfill this wish by means of Variations, the writing of which he had until then considered an ungrateful task on account of the repeatedly similar harmonic foundation. But since at this time all his works were already models of art, such also these variations became under his hand. Yet he produced only a single work of this kind. Thereafter the count always called them his variations. He never tired of them, and for a long time sleepless nights meant: 'Dear Goldberg, do play me one of my variations.' Bach was perhaps never so rewarded for one of his works as for this. The count presented him with a golden goblet filled with 100 louis-d'or. Nevertheless, even had the gift been a thousand times larger, their artistic value would not yet have been paid for.

The accuracy of the story recounted by Forkel has often been questioned, and indeed may have been embellished by Bach's enthusiastic biographer. However, Goldberg was known as a virtuoso performer at the time, when he was also in the employ of Keyserling, and was also most likely in Leipzig, based on the similarity of the cantatas he composed to those by Bach; a teacher–student relationship has been suggested by many scholars on the similarity of the cantatas alone.

Goldberg's presence in Leipzig can also be verified due to the presence of performance parts for one of his cantatas, Durch die herzliche Barmherzigkeit.

Goldberg remained with Count Keyserling until around 1745, and disappears from the historical record until around 1750, when he was included in a concert described by W. F. Bach in a letter of 1767. In 1751 Goldberg was hired by Count Heinrich von Brühl, who had previously employed Gottlob Harrer. He remained in the employ of Brühl for the rest of his short life. He died of tuberculosis at the age of 29 and was buried in Dresden on 15 April 1756.

== Works ==
Goldberg's works, while much less famous than the composition by Bach that used his name, varied widely in style, showing influences from most of the musical trends during that transitional period in music history. His earlier works are similar to those of J. S. Bach, and suggest that the story he studied with the famous composer may be true; his later works show that he was sensitive to the popular tastes of the Dresden court, especially in his use of the galant style. Some of his last works, especially the concertos, use a sophisticated harmonic language akin to that of Bach's son Carl Philipp Emanuel, and were probably written for the musicians of Heinrich von Brühl. Syncopation, chromaticism, and melodies with a wide range are characteristic of these later works.

He wrote cantatas while a student of Bach, for instance, around 1745–46, Durch die herzliche Barmherzigkeit, a church cantata for the feast of St. John the Baptist. His output also includes six trio sonatas (among which BWV 1037 previously attributed to Bach); keyboard music, including 24 polonaises, one in each of the major and minor keys; concertos for harpsichord; and a set of chorale preludes which has been lost.
