= Lorenz Christoph Mizler =

German music historian and polymath (1711–1778)

Lorenz Christoph Kolof
- Born: July 26, 1711; Heidenheim, Principality of Ansbach
- Died: May 8, 1778 (aged 66); Warsaw, Kingdom of Poland
- Other name: Lorenz Christoph Mizler von Kolof (from 1768)
- Occupations: Physician, historian, printer, mathematician, composer

First page of Johann Sebastian Bach's "Nekrolog" as published in Mizler's Musikalische Bibliothek, volume IV, part 1 (1754)

Lorenz Christoph Mizler von Kolof (also known as Wawrzyniec Mitzler de Kolof and Mitzler de Koloff; 26 July 1711 – 8 May 1778) was a German physician, historian, printer, mathematician, Baroque music composer, and precursor of the Enlightenment in Poland.

== Family of origin ==
Lorenz Christoph Mizler was born in Heidenheim, Middle Franconia to Johann Georg Mizler, a court clerk to the Margrave of Ansbach at Heidenheim, and Barbara Stumpf, of St. Gallen, Switzerland.

== Education ==
His first teacher was N. Müller, a minister from Obersulzbach, Lehrberg, from whom Mizler learned the flute and violin. From 1724 to 1730, Mizler studied at the Ansbach Gymnasium with Rector Oeder and Johann Matthias Gesner, who became director of the St. Thomas School, Leipzig, from 1731 to 1734.

Mizler enrolled at Leipzig University on 30 April 1731, where he studied theology. His teachers there included Gesner, Johann Christoph Gottsched, and Christian Wolff. He earned a BS in December 1733 and a MS in March 1734. During this time, he also pursued the study of composition and had some association with Johann Sebastian Bach, whom, he wrote, he had the honor to call his "good friend and patron."

Mizler moved to Wittenberg in 1735 to study law and medicine; returning to Leipzig in 1736.

== Career ==
From May 1737, Mizler began lecturing on music history and Johann Mattheson's Neu-eröffnete Orchestre [Newly Published Orchestra] he was the first to lecture on music at a German university in 150 years. He also began a monthly publication, the Neu eröffnete musikalische Bibliothek [Newly Published Musical Library] in 1738.

At about this time, Mizler began a music publishing business; and he returned school to take a doctorate of medicine at Erfurt University in 1747.

=== Move to Poland ===
In 1743 he left Leipzig and settled permanently in Poland. Mitzler de Kolof (his nom de guerre in Poland) became secretary, teacher, librarian and court mathematician to Count Małachowski of Końskie, from whom he learned Polish and with whom he studied Polish history and literature.

In 1747 Mizler moved to Warsaw. Mitzler also began a medical practice, which included consulting as a court physician to King August III. When he became court physician, this afforded him time to study the natural sciences.

Mizler established the publishing house 'Mizlerischer Bücherverlag, Warschau und Leipzig' in 1740.

== Honors ==
Mitzler became a member of the Erfurt Academy of Sciences in 1755, and received Polish nobility in 1768.

== Publisher ==
In association with the Załuski Library, Mitzler published and edited Poland's first scientific periodicals: Warschauer Bibliothek (1753–55), Acta Litteraria... (1755–56), Nowe Wiadomości Ekonomiczne i Uczone [Economic and Learned News], 1758–61 and 1766–67). From 1765 he published the Monitor (1765–85), which had been founded at the initiative of King Stanisław August Poniatowski, from 1773 until 1777 as its editor. In 1756 he set up a printing establishment, which in 1768 he conveyed (together with a type foundry) to Warsaw's Corps of Cadets, while retaining the business' directorship. At this printing establishment, Mitzler published scholarly editions of historic sources (a collection of chronicles, Collectio magna, 1761–71), literary works, and textbooks for the Corps of Cadets. He also operated a bookstore.

Mitzler de Kolof promoted new ideas, including the emancipation of Poland's townspeople. From 1743 he was the chief advocate, in Poland, of Christian Wolff's philosophical doctrines.

== Death ==
Mitzler died in Warsaw in 1778.

== Music ==
Mitzler, an amateur composer, was deeply interested in music theory, advocating the establishment of a musical science based firmly on mathematics; philosophy; and the imitation of nature in music. He translated Johann Joseph Fux's Gradus ad Parnassum into German (the original was in Latin), having written of it that "this methodical guide to musical composition [is] among all such works the best book that we have for practical music and its composition."

Mitzler was a polymath: his interests encompassed music, mathematics, philosophy, theology, law, and the natural sciences. He was influenced in philosophy by the ideas of Wolff, Gottfried Leibniz, and Gottsched.

The journal Musikalische Bibliothek [musical library], which he published between 1736 and 1754, is an important document of the musical life in Germany at the time, and includes reviews of books on music written from 1650 up to its publication. Mizler himself contributed commentaries and criticisms on the writings of Wolfgang Printz, Leonhard Euler, Johann Adolf Scheibe, Johann Samuel Schroeter, Meinrad Spieß, Gottsched, and Mattheson; especially the latter two's Critische Dichtkunst (1729) and Vollkommene Capellmeister (1739). His essays were detailed and perceptive and offer a useful musicological resource for present-day scholars of Baroque music.

=== Musical society ===
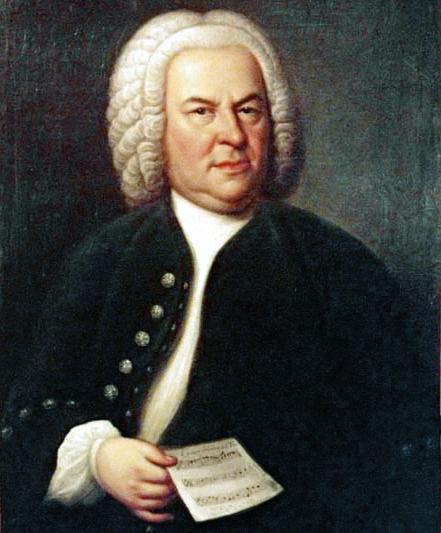
The portrait of Bach commissioned for his entry into Mizler's Sozietät der Musicalischen Wissenschaften

He founded the Correspondierende Societät der musicalischen Wissenschaften [Corresponding Society of the Musical Sciences] in 1738. Its aim was to enable musical scholars to circulate theoretical papers in order to further musical science by encouraging discussion of the papers via correspondence. Many of the papers appear in the Musikalische Bibliothek. The entry requirements of this society resulted in both the famous 1746/1748 Haussmann portrait of Bach and his Canonic Variations on "Vom Himmel hoch da komm' ich her" for organ, BWV 769.

Membership was limited to twenty. Belonging to the society were:

- 1738:
  - Giacomo de Lucchesini
  - L. C. Mizler (permanent secretary)
  - Georg Heinrich Bümler
- 1739
  - Christoph Gottlieb Schröter
  - Heinrich Bokemeyer
  - G. P. Telemann
  - G. H. Stölzel
- 1742:
  - Georg Friedrich Lingke
- 1743:
  - Meinrad Spieß
  - Georg Venzky
- 1745:
  - G. F. Handel
  - Udalricus Weiss
- 1746:
  - C. H. Graun
- 1747:
  - J. S. Bach
  - G. A. Sorge
  - Johann Paul Kunzen
- 1748:
  - J. C. F. Fischer
- 1751:
  - Johann Christian Winter
- 1752:
  - Johann Georg Kaltenbeck
- 1755:
  - L. Mozart (invitation declined)

=== Compositions ===
- Sammlung auserlesener moralischer Oden, zum Nutzen und Vergnügen der Liebhaber des Claviers I (Leipzig, 1740), II (Leipzig, 1741), III (Leipzig, 1743). Facsimiles published (Leipzig, 1971)

== Writings ==
- Dissertatio quod musica ars sit pars eruditionis philosophicae (Leipzig, 1734)
- Lusus ingenii de praesenti bello (Wittenberg, 1735)
- De usu atque praestantia philosophiae in theologia, jurisprudentia, medicina (Leipzig, 1736)
- Neu eröffnete musikalische Bibliothek, oder Gründliche Nachricht nebst unpartheyischem Urtheil von musikalischen Schriften und Büchern (Leipzig, 1739)
- Musikalischer Staarstecher, in welchem rechtschaffener Musikverständigen Fehler bescheiden angemerket, eingebildeter und selbst gewachsener sogenannter Componisten Thorheiten aber lächerlich gemachet werden (Leipzig, 1739–1740)
- Anfangs-Gründe des General-Basses nach mathematischer Lehr-Art abgehandelt (Leipzig, 1739)
- Gradus ad Parnassum, oder Anführung zur regelmässigen Composition, aus dem Lateinischen ins Deutsche übersetzt, und mit Anmerkungen versehen (Leipzig, 1742), translation of J. J. Fux: Gradus ad Parnassum (Vienna, 1725)

== See also ==
- History of philosophy in Poland
