= Partita for keyboard No. 4, BWV 828 =

1728 keyboard suite by Johann Sebastian Bach

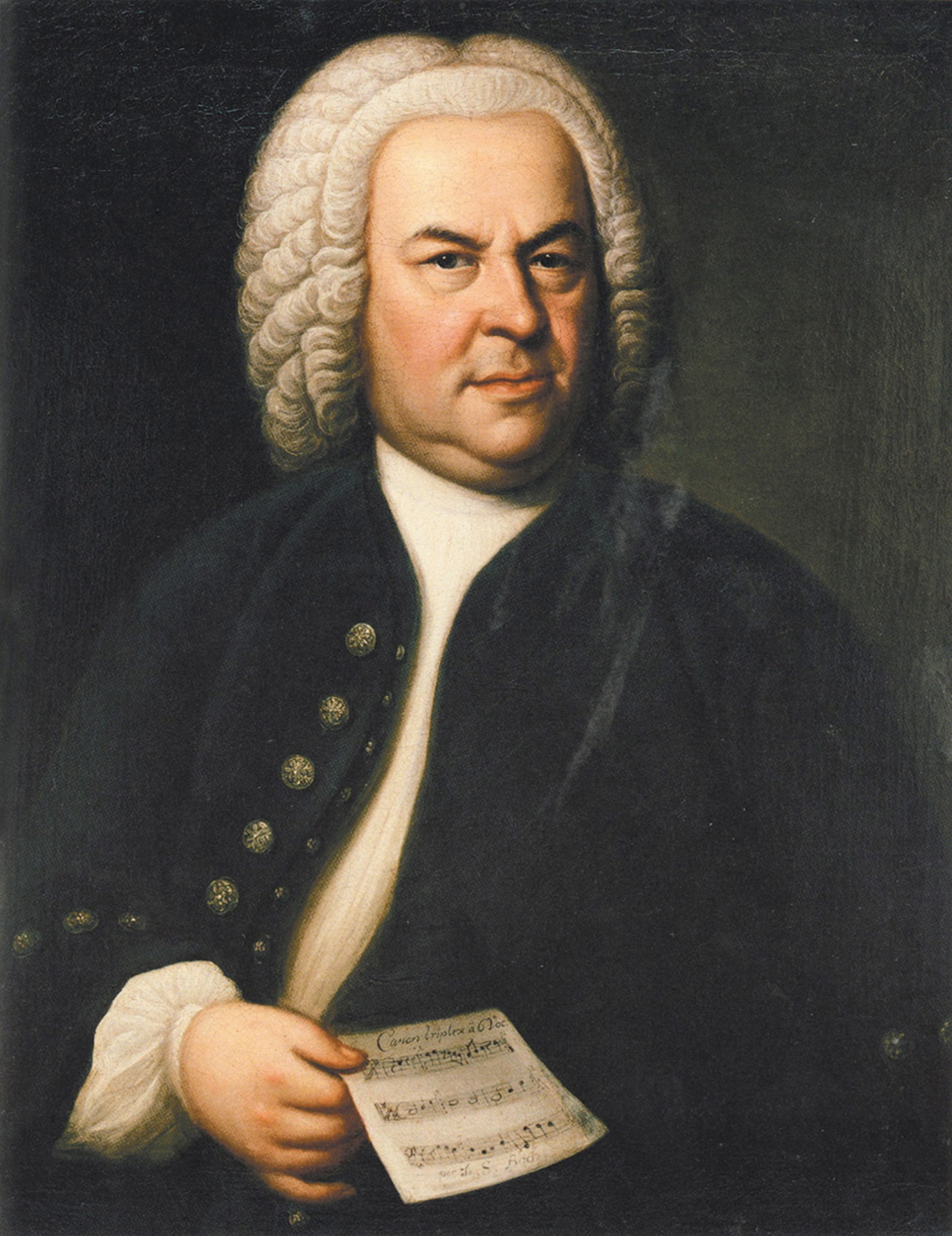
Johann Sebastian Bach

Partita for keyboard No. 4 in D major, BWV 828, is a keyboard suite by Johann Sebastian Bach, originally dated 1728. It is the fourth suite in his Clavier-Übung I.

== Structure ==
This partita consists of seven movements all in D major.

1. Ouvertüre. The beginning of this movement is alla breve (2/2) and the rest of the movement is in 9/8.
2. Allemande
3. Courante
4. Aria
5. Sarabande
6. Menuet
7. Gigue
