= Clavier-Übung II =

Collection of harpsichord compositions by Johann Sebastian Bach

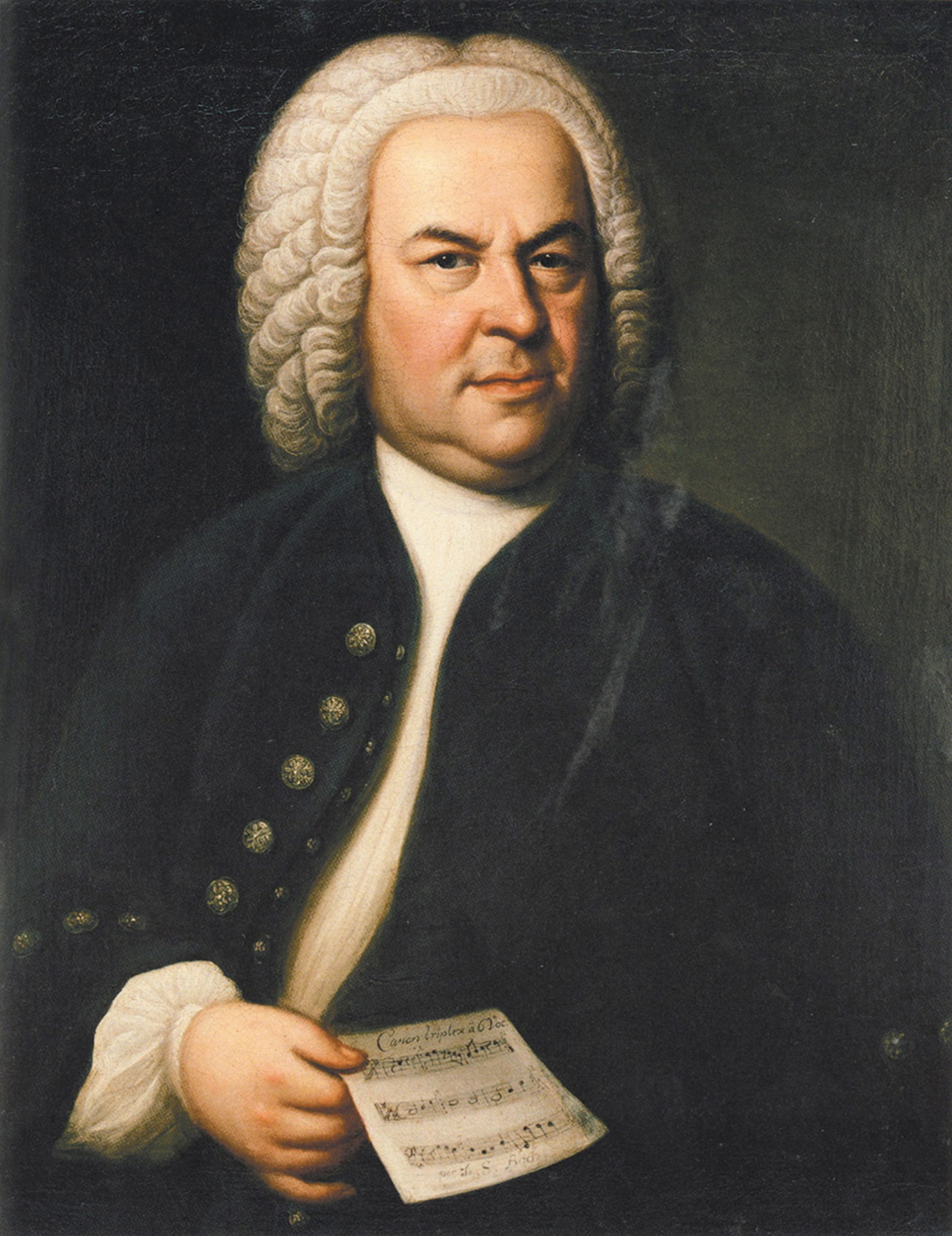
1748 portrait of J.S. Bach

Clavier-Übung II is a collection of harpsichord compositions by Johann Sebastian Bach. It was published in 1735. Written for performance on a two-manual harpsichord, it contrasts the Italian style of that time with the French style. While the Italian style is represented by the Italian Concerto, BWV 971, the French style is represented by the suite Overture in the French style, BWV 831.

== History ==
The French Overture had previously been written down in C minor; for the publication of 1735 Bach transposed it to B minor and made slight changes to the musical text, for example in the rhythms of the first movement. The reason for the transposition is not known: one speculation is that the aim was to increase the contrast between the two works. F major is a "flat" key and B minor is a "sharp" key, and the keynotes are related by a tritone, which is the most distant modulation. Another possible motivation is that out of the eight German note names A, B (B♭), C, D, E, F, G, H (B♮), six had already been used as keynotes in the Partitas, thus only F and H remained.

The keys of the Partitas (B♭ major, C minor, A minor, D major, G major, E minor) may seem like an irregular sequence, but in fact they form a sequence of intervals going up and then down by increasing amounts: a second up (B♭ to C), a third down (C to A), a fourth up (A to D), a fifth down (D to G), and finally a sixth up (G to E). The sequence continues into Clavier-Übung II with the Italian Concerto, a seventh down (E to F), and the French Ouverture, an augmented fourth up (F to B-natural). Thus the sequence of customary tonalities for 18th-century keyboard compositions is complete, extending from the first letter of his name (Bach's "home" key, B♭, in German is B) to the last letter of his name (B♮ in German is H).
