= Overture in the French style, BWV 831 =

Keyboard composition by Johann Sebastian Bach

The Overture in the French style, BWV 831, original title Ouvertüre nach Französischer Art, also known as the French Overture and published as the second half of the Clavier-Übung II in 1735 (paired with the Italian Concerto), is a suite in B minor for a two-manual harpsichord written by Johann Sebastian Bach.

== Terminology and structure ==
The term overture refers to the fact that this suite starts with an overture movement, and was a common generic name for French suites (his orchestral suites were similarly named). This "overture" movement replaces the allemande found in Bach's other keyboard suites. Also, there are optional dance movements both before and after the Sarabande. In Bach's work optional movements usually occur only after the sarabande. All three of the optional dance movements are presented in pairs, with the first one repeated after the second, but without the internal repeats. Also unusual for Bach is the inclusion of an extra movement after the Gigue, the "Echo," a piece meant to exploit the terraced loud and soft dynamics of the two-manual harpsichord. Other movements also have dynamic indications (piano and forte), which are not often found in keyboard suites of the Baroque period, and indicate here the use of the two keyboards of the harpsichord. With eleven movements, the French Overture is the longest keyboard suite ever composed by Bach. It usually has a duration of around 30 minutes if all the repeats in every movement are taken.

== Place in the Clavier-Übung ==
Bach wrote an earlier version of the work, in the key of C minor (BWV 831a) later transposed to B minor to complete the cycle of tonalities in Parts One and Two of the Clavier-Übung. The keys of the six Partitas (B♭ major, C minor, A minor, D major, G major, E minor) of Clavier-Übung I form a sequence of intervals going up and then down by increasing amounts: a second up (B♭ to C), a third down (C to A), a fourth up (A to D), a fifth down (D to G), and finally a sixth up (G to E). The key sequence is continued in Clavier-Übung II (1735) with two larger works: the Italian Concerto, a seventh down (E to F), and the French Overture, an augmented fourth up (F to B♮). Thus a sequence of customary tonalities for 18th-century keyboard compositions is complete, beginning with the first letter of Bach's name (B♭, in German is B) and ending with the last (B♮ in German is H).

== Movements ==
1. Ouvertüre
2. Courante
3. Gavotte I/II
4. Passepied I/II
5. Sarabande
6. Bourrée I/II
7. Gigue
8. Echo

== Style ==
The style of this work is similar to that of composers like Jean-Baptiste Lully and François Couperin, but it also bears similarities with German composers like Johann Caspar Ferdinand Fischer and Georg Philipp Telemann. Such suites with an introducing overture were normally composed for orchestral settings, but rarely for solo instruments.
