= Italian Concerto (Bach) =

1735 harpsichord work by J. S. Bach

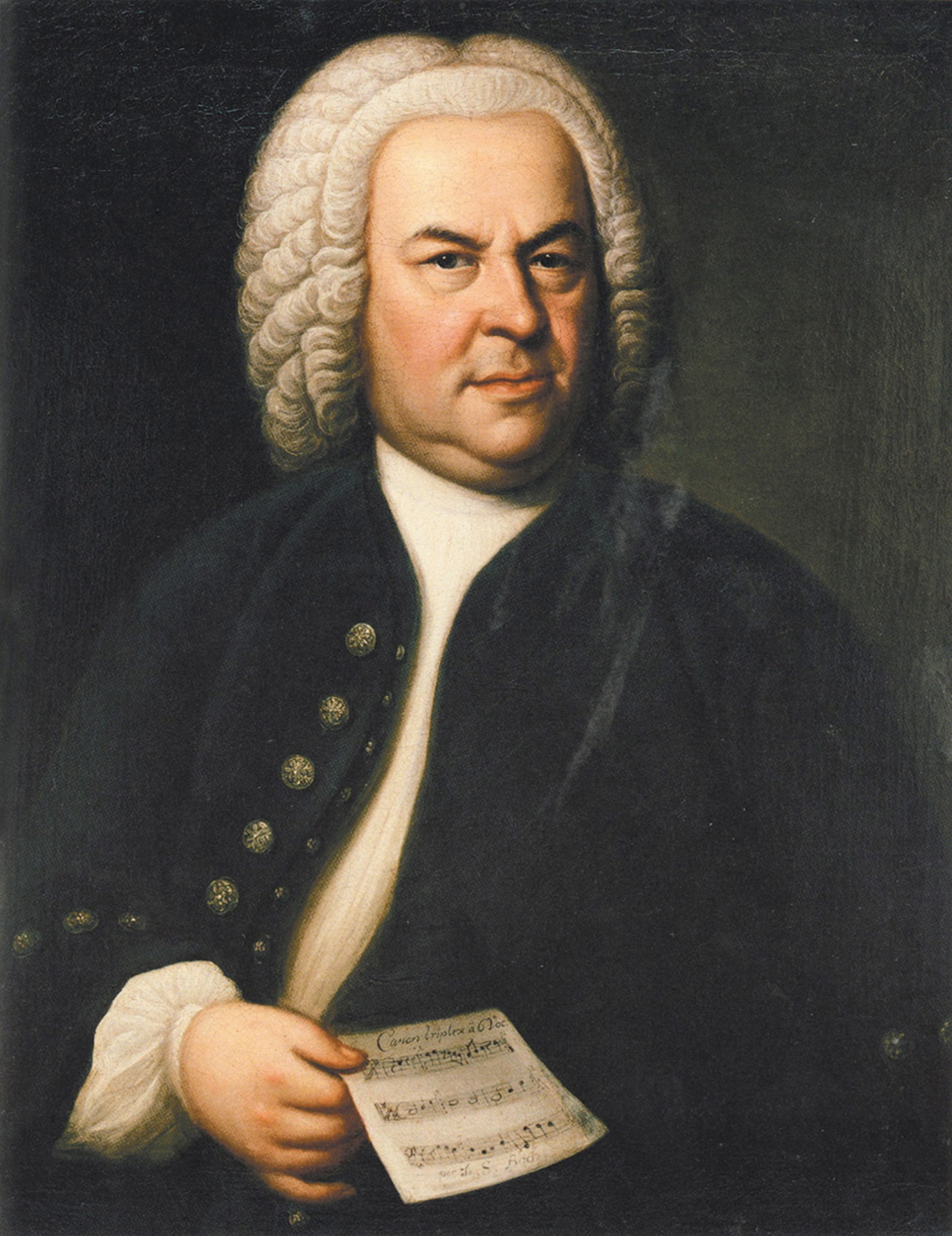
1748 portrait of Bach

The Italian Concerto, BWV 971, originally titled Concerto nach Italiænischen Gusto (Concerto in the Italian taste), is a three-movement concerto for two-manual harpsichord solo composed by Johann Sebastian Bach and published in 1735 as the first half of Clavier-Übung II (the second half being the French Overture). The Italian Concerto has become popular among Bach's keyboard works, and has been widely recorded both on the harpsichord and piano.

== Context ==
An Italian concerto relies upon the contrasting roles of different groups of instruments in an ensemble; Bach imitates this effect by creating contrasts using the forte and piano manuals of a two-manual harpsichord throughout the piece.

=== Related works ===
Along with the French Overture and some of the Goldberg Variations, this is one of the few works by Bach which specifically require a 2-manual harpsichord. However, it is not unusual in being a solo keyboard work based on Italian concertos. Long before the publication of the Italian Concerto, Bach produced a number of concerto transcriptions while working at Weimar. These are of music by Vivaldi and others, reflecting the court's interest in Italian music. They are for harpsichord (BWV 972–987), and for organ or pedal harpsichord (BWV 592–596).

== Movements ==
I. [Allegro]

II. Andante

III. Presto
Performed by Martha Goldstein (harpsichord)

I. [Allegro]

II. Andante

III. Presto
Performed by Radek Materka (piano)

The Italian Concerto consists of three movements:

1. [Allegro]
2. Andante
3. Presto

The two lively F major outer movements, in ritornello style, frame a florid arioso-style movement in D minor, the relative minor.

== Discography ==
=== Harpsichord ===
- Wanda Landowska recorded the first movement in 1908.
- George Malcolm recorded the work twice in the 1950s.

=== Piano ===
- Alfred Brendel included the work in a Bach album he recorded for Decca.
- Andras Schiff has also recorded the work for Decca.
