= Joh. Seb. Bach's Werke =

Collection of works by Bach

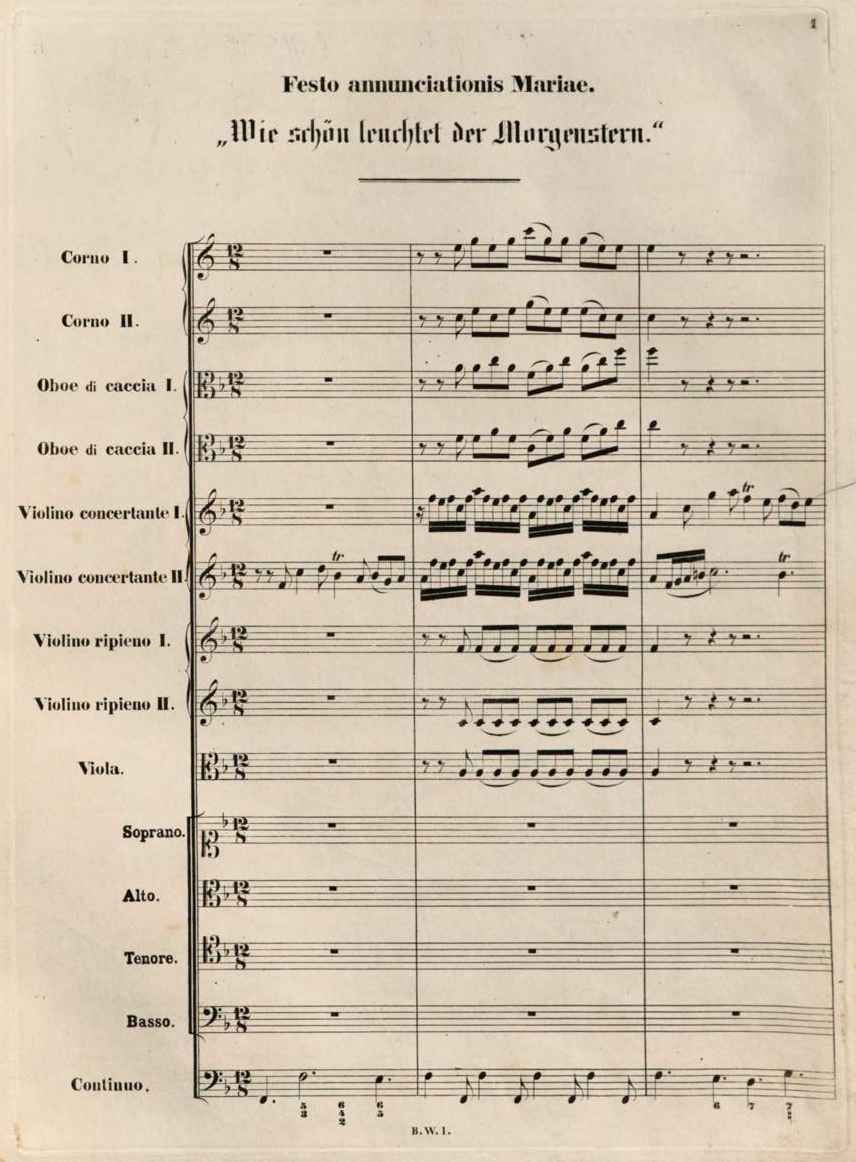
Bach Gesellschaft edition Vol. 1, p. 1: start of the score of BWV 1.

Joh. Seb. Bach's Werke (lit. 'Joh. Seb. Bach's works') is the Bach Gesellschaft's collected edition of Johann Sebastian Bach's compositions, published in 61 volumes in the second half of the 19th century. The series is also known as Bach-Gesellschaft edition (German: Bach-Gesellschaft Ausgabe; BGA), or as Bach-Gesamtausgabe (BG; lit. 'Bach complete edition'). It is a German-language edition: title pages and notes by editors are exclusively in German.

A supplemental volume was published in 1926, a quarter of a century after the Bach Gesellschaft's dissolution. Another late addition to the series was Max Schneider's 1935 revision of the fourth volume. All volumes, including the 20th-century additions, were published by Breitkopf & Härtel. As a complete edition of Bach's works it was succeeded by the New Bach Edition, published between 1954 and 2007.

== Volumes ==
The year (Yr.) in the second column refers to the volume's date of publication, that is the date of the editor's Vorwort ('Preface') if different from the date on the title page.

Volumes of Joh. Seb. Bach's Werke
V.	Yr.	Title	Editor	Content
1	1851	Kirchencantaten I	Hauptmann	Church cantatas BWV 1–10
2	1852	Kirchencantaten II	Hauptmann	Church cantatas BWV 11–20
3	1853	Clavierwerke I	Becker	Keyboard music BWV 552, 669–689, 772–805, 825–831, 910–911, 944, 971, 988
4	1854	Passionsmusik: Matthäus	Rietz	St Matthew Passion
5.1	1855	Kirchencantaten III	Rust	Church cantatas BWV 21–30
5.2	1856	Weihnachts-Oratorium	Rust	Christmas Oratorio
6.1	1856	Messe H moll	Rietz	Mass in B minor
6.2	1857	Messe H moll: 2^{te} Hälfte	Rietz	Mass in B minor II–IV (revised)
7	1857	Kirchencantaten IV	Rust	Church cantatas BWV 31–40
8	1858	Messen	Hauptmann	Kyrie–Gloria masses BWV 233–236
9	1860	Kammermusik I	Rust	Chamber music BWV 1014–1019, 1025, 1027–1032, 1037–1039
10	1860	Kirchencantaten V	Rust	Church cantatas BWV 41–50
11.1	1862	Magnificat D dur; 4 Sanctus	Rust	Magnificat BWV 243; Sanctus BWV 237–240
11.2	1862	Kammermusik für Gesang I	Rust	Secular cantatas BWV 201–205
12.1	1863	Passionsmusik: Johannes	Rust	St John Passion
12.2	1863	Kirchencantaten VI	Rust	Church cantatas BWV 51–60
13.1	1864	Trauungs-Cantaten	Rust	Church cantatas for weddings BWV 195–197, 250–252 (Three Wedding Chorales)
13.2	1865	Clavierwerke II	Espagne	Keyboard music BWV 806–817 (English Suites; French Suites)
13.3	1865	Trauer-Ode	Rust	Mourning Ode, BWV 198
14	1866	Clavierwerke III	Kroll	Keyboard music BWV 846–893 (The Well-Tempered Clavier)
15	1867	Orgelwerke I	Rust	Organ music BWV 525–539, 541–548, 564–566, 582
16	1868	Kirchencantaten VII	Rust	Church cantatas BWV 61–70
17	1869	Kammermusik II	Rust	Chamber music BWV 1044, 1052–1058
18	1870	Kirchencantaten VIII	Rust	Church cantatas BWV 71–80
19	1871	Kammermusik III	Rust	Chamber music BWV 1046–1051 (Brandenburg Concertos)
20.1	1872	Kirchencantaten IX	Rust	Church cantatas BWV 81–90
20.2	1873	Kammermusik für Gesang II	Rust	Secular cantatas BWV 206–207.2
21.1	1874	Kammermusik IV	Rust	Chamber music BWV 1041–1043, 1045
21.2	1874	Kammermusik V	Rust	Chamber music BWV 1060–1062
21.3	1874	Oster-Oratorium	Rust	Easter Oratorio
22	1875	Kirchencantaten X	Rust	Church cantatas BWV 91–100
23	1876	Kirchencantaten XI	Rust	Church cantatas BWV 101–110
24	1876	Kirchencantaten XII	Dörffel	Church cantatas BWV 111–120
25.1	1878	Die Kunst der Fuge	Rust	The Art of Fugue
25.2	1878	Orgelwerke II	Rust	Chorale preludes BWV 599–668
26	1878	Kirchencantaten XIII	Dörffel	Church cantatas BWV 121–130
27.1	1879	Kammermusik VI	Dörffel	Chamber music BWV 1001–1012 (Sonatas and Partitas for Violin; Cello Suites)
27.2	1879	Verzeichniss I	Dörffel	Catalogue BWV 1–120
28	1881	Kirchencantaten XIV	Rust	Church cantatas BWV 131–140
29	1881	Kammermusik für Gesang III	Waldersee	Secular cantatas BWV 134.1, 208–212; Church cantata BWV 194
30	1884	Kirchencantaten XV	Waldersee	Church cantatas BWV 141–150
31.1	1885	Orchesterwerke	Dörffel	Orchestral suites BWV 1066–1069; Sinfonia BWV 1046.1
31.2	1885	Musikalisches Opfer	Dörffel	The Musical Offering
31.3	1885	Kammermusik VII	Waldersee	Chamber music BWV 1063–1064
32	1886	Kirchencantaten XVI	Naumann	Church cantatas BWV 151–160
33	1887	Kirchencantaten XVII	Wüllner	Church cantatas BWV 161–170
34	1887	Kammermusik für Gesang IV	Waldersee	Secular cantatas BWV 30.1, 36.1, 36.3, 173.1, 207.2, 213–215
35	1888	Kirchencantaten XVIII	Dörffel	Church cantatas BWV 171–180
36	1890	Clavierwerke IV	Naumann	Keyboard music BWV 818–822 (suites); various pieces in the BWV 841–999 range
37	1891	Kirchencantaten XIX	Dörffel	Church cantatas BWV 181–190
38	1891	Orgelwerke III	Naumann	Organ music BWV 131a, 549–551, 553–563, 567–580, 583, 585, 587–595, 598
39	1892	Motetten, Choräle, Lieder	Wüllner	Motets BWV 225–231, Anh. 159; Four-part chorales and songs BWV 253–518
40	1893	Orgelwerke IV	Naumann	Chorale preludes BWV 690–771
41	1894	Kirchenmusikwerke	Dörffel	Church music BWV 34.2, 120.2, 178, 191–193, 197.1, 199.2, 217–220, 241–242
42	1894	Clavierwerke V	Naumann	Keyboard music BWV 592a; various pieces in the BWV 821–1006.2 range
43.1	1894	Kammermusik VIII	Waldersee	Chamber music BWV 1023, 1026, 1033–1035, 1065
43.2	1894	Notenbüchern A. M. Bach	Waldersee	Notebooks for Anna Magdalena Bach
44	1895	Handschrift	Kretzschmar	Manuscript facsimiles
45.1	1897	Instrumentalwerke	Dörffel	Instrumental music BWV 806–817 (rev.); Canons; Klavierbüchlein W. F. Bach; etc.
45.2	1898	Passionsmusik: Lucas	Dörffel	St Luke Passion
46	1899	Verzeichniss II	Kretzschmar	Catalogue BWV 121ff
—	1926	Die Kunst der Fuge	Graeser	The Art of Fugue (revised)
—	1935	Passionsmusik: Matthäus	Schneider	St Matthew Passion (revised)

== Reception ==
Gustav Mahler owned 59 of the 61 volumes of the Bach-Gesamtausgabe, and used them for his arrangements of some of Bach's compositions.

== Sources ==
- Dürr, Alfred; Kobayashi, Yoshitake, eds. (1998). Bach Werke Verzeichnis: Kleine Ausgabe – Nach der von Wolfgang Schmieder vorgelegten 2. Ausgabe [Bach Works Catalogue: Small Edition – After Wolfgang Schmieder's 2nd edition] (in German). Kirsten Beißwenger (collaborator). (BWV^{2a} ed.). Wiesbaden: Breitkopf & Härtel. ISBN 978-3-7651-0249-3. Preface in English and German.
- Terry, Charles Sanford (1920). "Appendix III: The Bachgesellschaft Editions of Bach's Works". Johann Sebastian Bach: His Life, Art, and Work. New York: Harcourt, Brace and Howe. pp. 225–286.
