= Wie schön leuchtet der Morgenstern, BWV 1 =

Church cantata by Johann Sebastian Bach

Wie schön leuchtet der Morgenstern
- BWV 1
- Chorale cantata by J. S. Bach
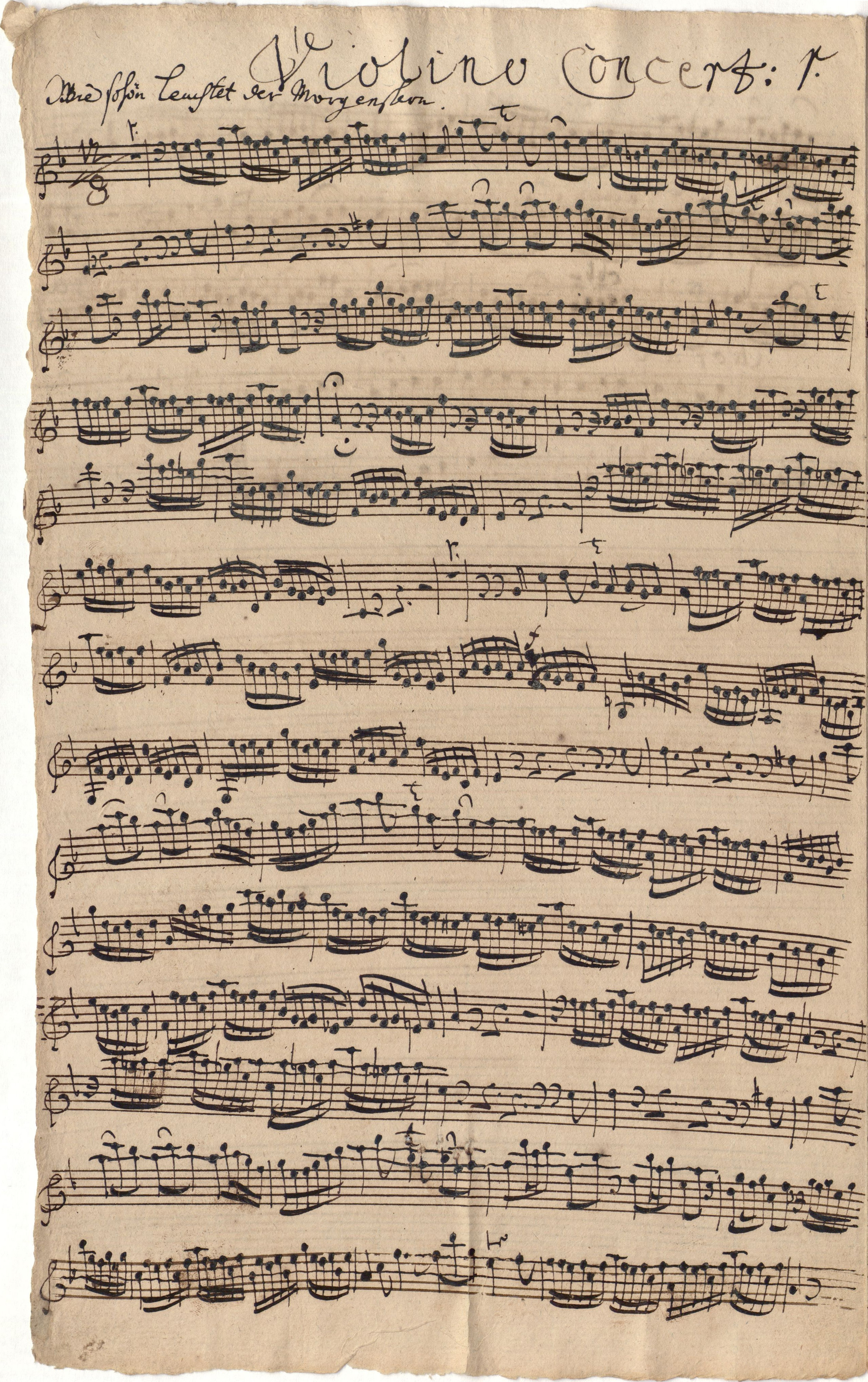
- First solo violin part, as used for the first performance of the cantata
- Key: F major
- Occasion: Annunciation; Palm Sunday
- Chorale: "Wie schön leuchtet der Morgenstern" by Philipp Nicolai
- Performed: 25 March 1725: Leipzig
- Movements: 6
- Vocal: soprano, tenor and bass soloists; SATB choir
- Instrumental: 2 horns; 2 oboes da caccia; 2 solo violins; strings; continuo

Wie schön leuchtet der Morgenstern ('How beautifully the morning star shines'), BWV 1, is a church cantata for Annunciation by Johann Sebastian Bach. In 1725, when the cantata was composed, the feast of the Annunciation (25 March) coincided with Palm Sunday. Based on Philipp Nicolai's hymn "Wie schön leuchtet der Morgenstern" (1599), it is one of Bach's chorale cantatas. Bach composed it in his second year as Thomaskantor in Leipzig, where the Marian feast was the only occasion during Lent when music of this kind was permitted. The theme of the hymn suits both the Annunciation and Palm Sunday occasions, in a spirit of longing expectation of an arrival. As usual for Bach's chorale cantata cycle, the hymn was paraphrased by a contemporary poet who retained the hymn's first and last stanzas unchanged, but transformed the themes of the inner stanzas into a sequence of alternating recitatives and arias.

Wie schön leuchtet der Morgenstern is the last chorale cantata of Bach's second cantata cycle, possibly because the librettist who provided the paraphrases for the middle movements of these cantatas was no longer available. Bach scored the work for three vocal soloists, a four-part choir and a Baroque instrumental ensemble of two horns, two oboes da caccia, two solo violins, strings and continuo. The chorale melody of Nicolai's hymn appears in the opening and closing choral movements of the cantata. All instruments play in the opening festive chorale fantasia, in which the soprano sings the hymn tune, and the two solo concertante violins represent the morning star. An oboe da caccia accompanies the vocal soloist in the first aria. The strings, including the solo violins, return in the second aria. An independent horn part crowns the closing chorale.

The original performance parts of the cantata, partly written by the composer, are conserved in Leipzig. Commentators writing about the cantata, such as Carl von Winterfeld in the 19th century and W. Gillies Whittaker in the 20th century, were particularly impressed by its opening chorus. The Bach-Gesellschaft published the cantata in 1851 as first work in the first volume of their complete edition of Bach's works. From then on known as Bach's Cantata No. 1, it retained that number in the Bach-Werke-Verzeichnis, published in 1950, and its recording appeared, in 1971, as first work of the first album of Teldec's complete Bach cantata recordings by Harnoncourt and Leonhardt.

== Background ==
In 1723, Bach was appointed as Thomaskantor and director musices in Leipzig, which made him responsible for the music at four churches. He provided church music for the two main churches, St. Thomas and St. Nicholas, and occasionally also for two others, the New Church and St. Peter. Bach took office in the middle of the liturgical year, on the first Sunday after Trinity.

In Leipzig, cantata music was expected on Sundays and on feast days, except during the tempus clausum ("silent periods") of Advent and Lent. Lutheran Leipzig observed several Marian feasts, including Annunciation on 25 March, nine months before Christmas. In 1725, the feast fell on Palm Sunday. Annunciation was the only occasion for festive music during Lent. The prescribed readings were, as the epistle, Isaiah's prophecy of the birth of the Messiah (Isaiah 7:10–16), and from the Gospel of Luke, the angel Gabriel announcing the birth of Jesus (Luke 1:26–38).

=== Cantata cycles ===
In his first twelve months in office, Bach decided to compose new works for almost all liturgical occasions. These works became known as his first cantata cycle. In his second year in office, Bach composed a cycle of chorale cantatas, with each cantata based on one Lutheran hymn, for the liturgical occasions. The choice of hymn for each of the cantatas was probably made according to the wishes of a local minister, who based the choices upon the prescribed readings and his plans for sermons. Compared to the first cycle, the music has less emphasis on biblical texts, but more on the use of chorale text and melody.

Bach's earliest extant chorale cantata, Christ lag in Todes Banden, BWV 4, written more than a decade before arriving in Leipzig, followed the per omnes versus principle, that is, it adopted the text of all stanzas of the hymn without modification, the hymn's melody being used throughout. Most of the chorale cantatas Bach wrote in his second year in Leipzig, including Wie schön leuchtet der Morgenstern, were formatted differently. In this structure, the outer stanzas of the hymn, and its melody, were retained in the outer movements of the cantata: typically the first stanza was set as an opening chorale fantasia, and the last as a closing four-part chorale. The inner stanzas of the hymn were rephrased into recitatives and arias for the cantata's inner movements, their setting mostly not based on the hymn tune.

=== Hymn ===
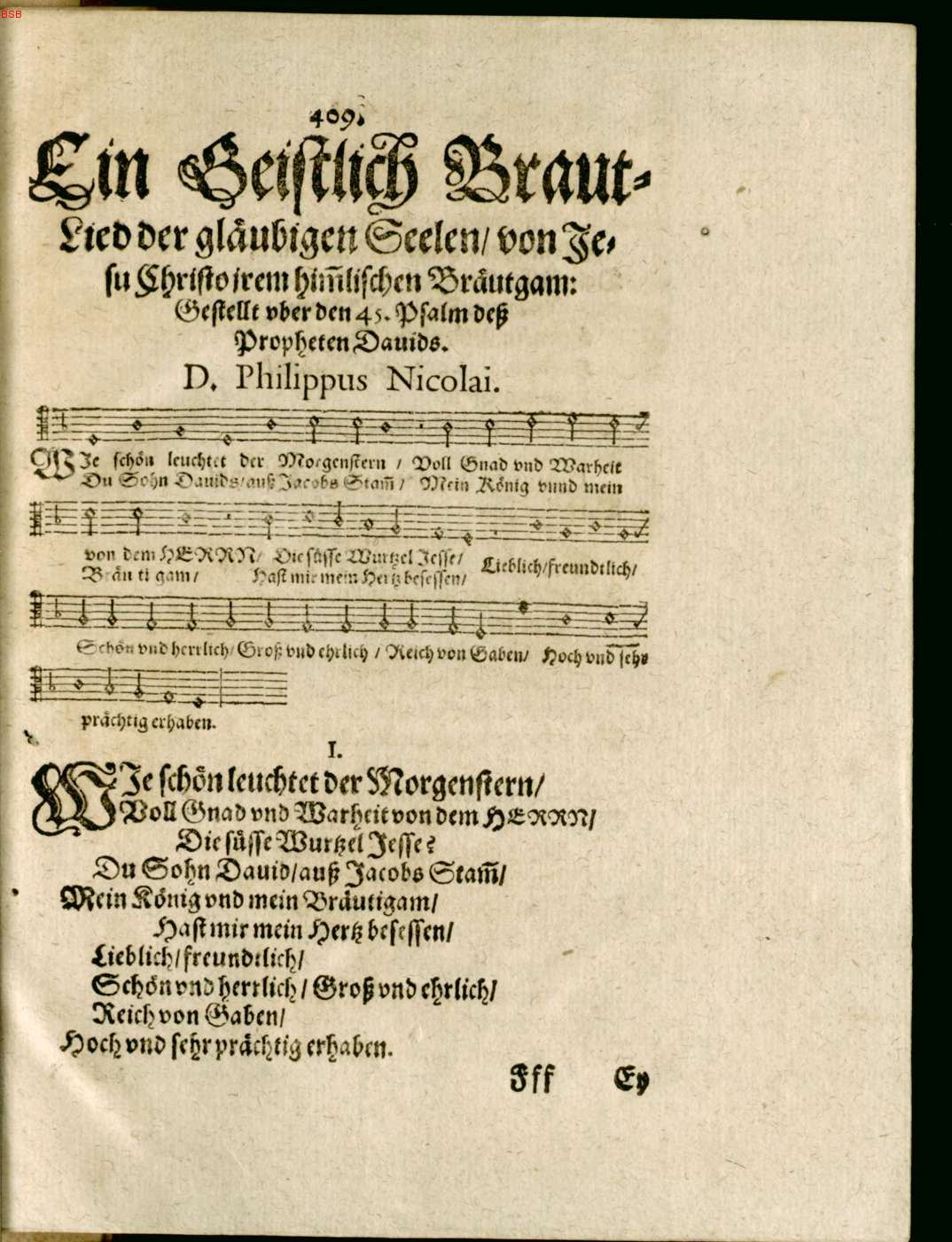
First publication of the hymn in Nicolai's 1599 Frewdenspiegel deß ewigen Lebens

Bach's cantata Wie schön leuchtet der Morgenstern is based on Philipp Nicolai's hymn with the same name. Nicolai wrote the hymn when he was pastor in Unna and faced an outbreak of the plague, intending it to project a view of a heavenly world as counterpoint to pain and suffering in the real world. Nicolai published the hymn in 1599 as part of a collection titled Frewdenspiegel deß ewigen Lebens ('Mirror of the joys of eternal life') in 1599. The hymn tune with which Nicolai published his text, Zahn No. 8359, is reminiscent of a 1538 melody published in the Strasbourg Psalter in 1539 with the song "Jauchzet dem Herren alle Land", possibly by Jakob Dachser, Zahn No. 1705.

The image of the morning star is taken from Revelation 22:16 ("I am the root and the offspring of David, and the bright and morning star."). In its title, Nicolai indicated the hymn as Brautlied ('Bridal song') of the soul addressing Jesus as its heavenly bridegroom, which refers to Psalm 45, described as a bridal song in the Luther Bible, and to the Song of Songs. Nicolai did not write a paraphrase of the biblical texts, but used elements from them for the seven stanzas of his hymn. He also alludes to the nativity.

The hymn was associated with Epiphany but also with the Annunciation. Expressing the longing for the arrival of the Saviour, it can be connected to the reading about Jesus' birth being announced to Mary. The theme of arrival was also fitting for Palm Sunday, when the arrival of Jesus in Jerusalem is celebrated.

=== Libretto ===
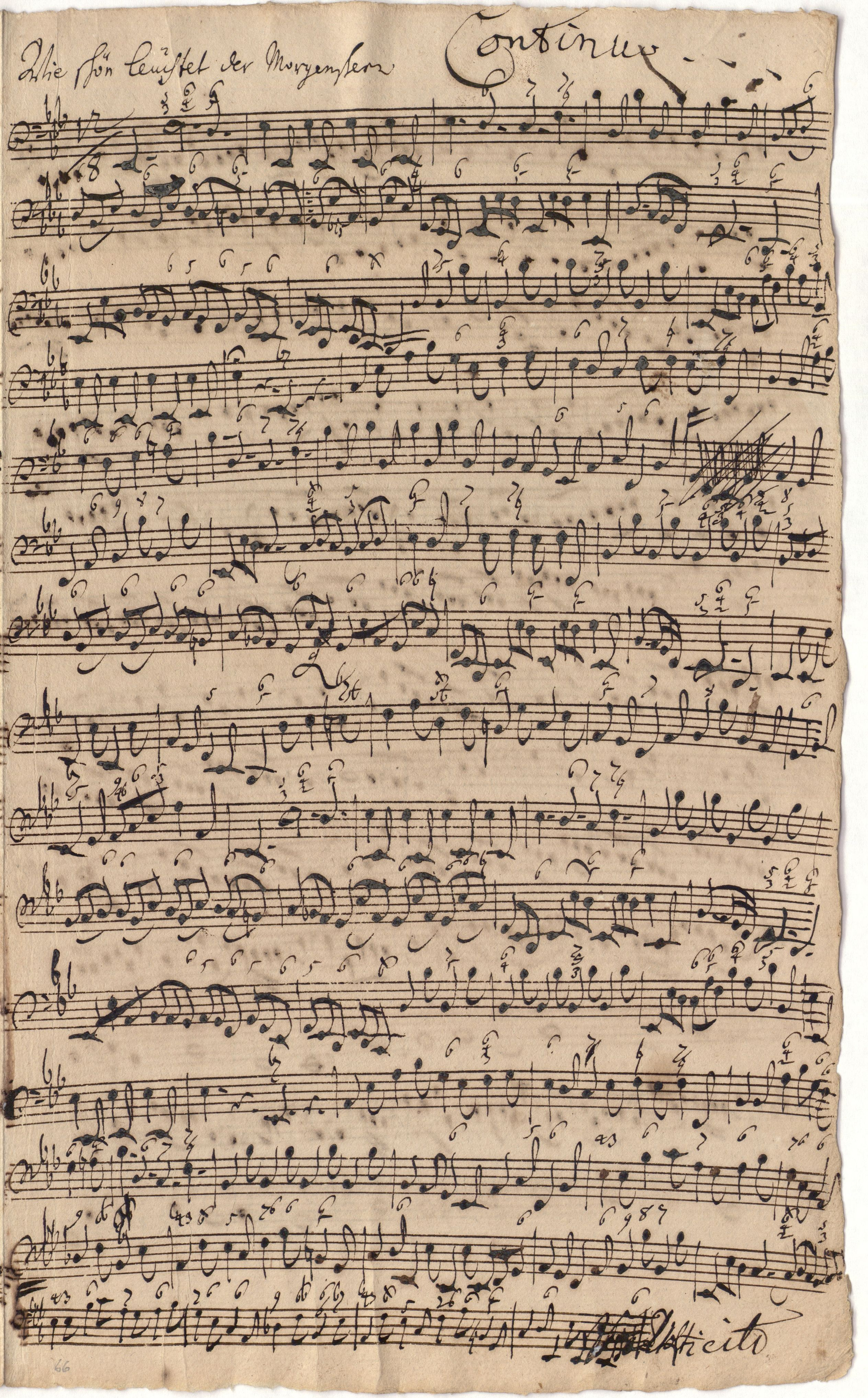
Original continuo performance part, with bass figures written by the composer

A librettist retained the first and last stanzas of the hymn and paraphrased the other stanzas, using the second stanza for the first recitative, the third stanza for the first aria, the fourth stanza and part of the fifth for the second recitative, and the sixth stanza for the second aria. Bach scholar Alfred Dürr wrote: "The librettist must be credited with the empathy he shows for that fervour which characterises Nicolai's poem and which has made his hymns into an enduring possession of the Protestant Church."

While the identity of the librettist, a "poetically and theologically competent specialist", is not certain, scholars have suggested Andreas Stübel, a Leipzig intellectual who held controversial theological views.

=== First performance ===
For the first performance of the cantata, on 25 March 1725, Bach helped copy out his composition score for the musicians participating in the premiere. Johann Andreas Kuhnau, a main copyist of Bach at the time, produced most of this performance material, that is, all performance parts, except the figured bass part (partly written by the composer) and one of the oboe da caccia parts (written by the composer's son Wilhelm Friedemann).

Wie schön leuchtet der Morgenstern was to be the last newly composed chorale cantata of Bach's second cantata cycle. If Stübel was the librettist, his death in January 1725 would explain the end of the chorale cantatas in the second cycle, because Bach lost a competent collaborator and source of inspiration. Bach returned to other texts for the remaining liturgical times of Easter, Pentecost and Trinity. The completion of the cycle of chorale cantatas was so important to him that he included the early chorale cantata for Easter, Christ lag in Todes Banden, in 1725, and over the following decade added a few chorale cantatas for some missing occasions.

== Music ==
The title page of the extant 18th-century set of performance parts of BWV 1, written around 1750 by an unknown scribe, mentions the occasion (Annunciation), the cantata's title (incipit) and scoring, and its composer.

=== Scoring and structure ===
Bach structured the cantata in six movements. Both text and tune of the hymn are retained in the outer choral movements, a chorale fantasia and a four-part closing chorale, which frame a sequence of alternating recitatives and arias. Bach scored the work for three vocal soloists (soprano (S), tenor (T) and bass (B)), a four-part choir, and a Baroque instrumental ensemble of two horns (Co), two oboes da caccia (Oc), two solo violins (Vs), strings consisting of two violin parts (Vl) and one viola part (Va), and basso continuo. A festive scoring like this, including brass, was usually employed on holidays. The duration of the cantata is given as 25 minutes.

In the following table of the movements, the scoring, keys and time signatures are taken from Dürr. The continuo, which plays throughout, is not shown.

Movements of Wie schön leuchtet der Morgenstern
No.	Title	Text	Type	Vocal	Winds	Strings	Key	Time
1	Wie schön leuchtet der Morgenstern	Nicolai	Chorale fantasia	SATB	2Co 2Oc	2Vs 2Vl Va	F major	12/8
2	Du wahrer Gottes und Marien Sohn	anon.	Recitative	T				common time
3	Erfüllet, ihr himmlischen göttlichen Flammen	anon.	Aria	S	Oc		B-flat major	common time
4	Ein irdscher Glanz, ein leiblich Licht	anon.	Recitative	B				common time
5	Unser Mund und Ton der Saiten	anon.	Aria	T		2Vs 2Vl Va	F major	3/8
6	Wie bin ich doch so herzlich froh	Nicolai	Chorale	SATB	2Co 2Oc	2Vl Va	F major	common time

=== Movements ===
Bach provided a rich orchestration. The sparkle of the morning star is illustrated by two solo violins, first in the first chorus, and reappearing with the other strings in the second aria. The sound of the oboe da caccia, first heard in the opening chorus, returns in the first aria. In the closing chorale, the four-part harmony setting of the hymn tune, performed by choir and colla parte instruments, is complemented by a counter-melody played by the second horn. The scoring is reminiscent of Sie werden aus Saba alle kommen, BWV 65, written for Epiphany 1724. Bach would later use the pair of horns in Part IV of his Christmas Oratorio, dealing with the naming of Jesus as announced to Mary.

==== 1 ====
The first movement, "Wie schön leuchtet der Morgenstern" ('How beautifully the morning star shines'), is a stately, richly coloured chorale fantasia for the chorus. The cantus firmus of the chorale melody is sung in long notes of dotted minims by the sopranos. A substantial orchestral 12-bar ritornello or sinfonia begins the movement, with the solo instruments in the foreground; its wide harmonic range contrasts with the chorale, which remains mostly in the tonic key of F major. Bach achieves "unusual animation" by setting the hymn not in common time but 12/8. The scintillating semiquaver passagework of two solo concertante violins illustrate the sparkle of the morning star. A baroque pastoral imagery is established by the addition of two other pairs of solo instruments which play pronouncedly below the range of the higher solo violin bariolage, resulting in a transparent multilayered musical texture: the two pairs of horns and oboes da caccia, all associated with the hunt and nature, evoking a bucolic landscape.

The text of the hymn is reflected in the music iconography: the horn calls signify the majesty of the king, while the virtuosic concertante violin passagework signifies the morning star and joy in the universe. Musical analysis of the chorale fantasia makes specific references to the 10 lines of the hymn text; an English metrical translation is given here as an ad hoc composite, combining two early 18th-century sources, the Lyra Davidica and the Psalmodia Germanica, as well as a late 19th-century translation by M. Woolsey Stryker.

Wie schön leuchtet der Morgenstern
Voll Gnad und Wahrheit von dem Herrn,
Die süße Wurzel Jesse!
Du Sohn David aus Jakobs Stamm,
Mein König und mein Bräutigam,
Hast mir mein Herz besessen,
Lieblich,
Freundlich,
Schön und herrlich, groß und ehrlich, reich von Gaben,
Hoch und sehr prächtig erhaben.

— Philipp Nicolai
Translation:

How fairly shines the morning star,
with God's full grace and truth afar,
sweet Jesse's offspring royal.
O David's son of Jacob's line,
thou art my king and spouse divine,
thou hast my heart true loyal.
Lovely,
kindly,
fair and glorious, great and righteous, rich in wonder,
high and most sublime in splendour.

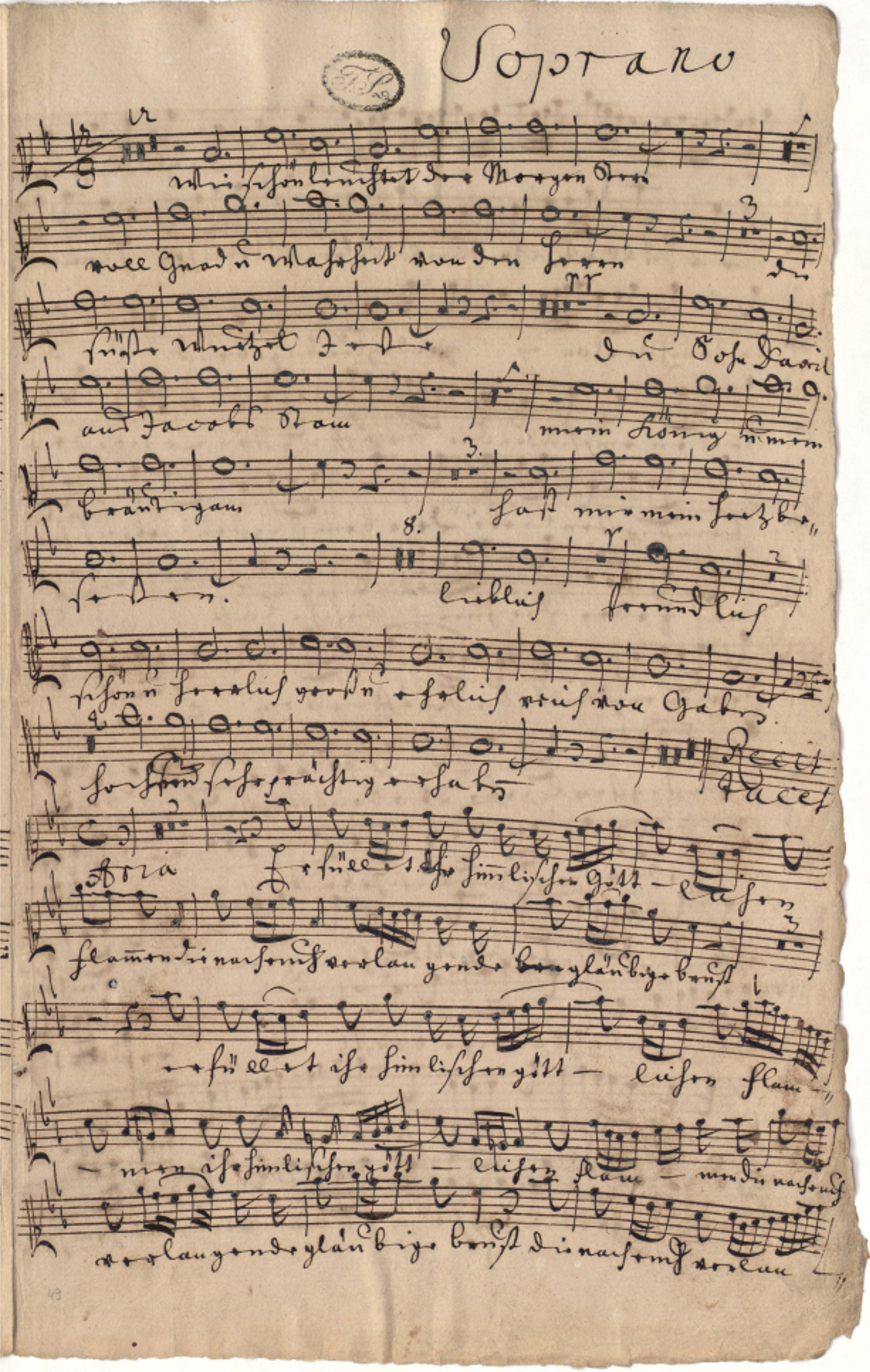
The cantus firmus in the soprano part, as used for the first performance of the cantata (copyist J. A. Kuhnau)

The 12-bar sinfonia is based on themes that are derived directly from the cantus firmus (notated here in the soprano clef); in particular the leap of a fifth in the opening theme and the recurring triads. Thus, as conductor John Eliot Gardiner notes, the movement begins intimately with a phrase of the second solo violin, with an orchestral tutti as response. The phrase is reprised a fifth higher by the first solo violin, again answered by the full orchestra. An inversion of the last three quavers in the first theme provides a second theme, which is heard amongst the three different solo instrumental groups—horns, oboes da caccia and violins—and is echoed individually, before an orchestral tutti on a cadence, heralding the entrance of the soprano. The sinfonia is similar in structure to a concerto grosso where different pairs of solo instruments compete against each other.

After the sinfonia, the first line of the soprano cantus firmus is countered by the lower voices with a version of the first theme, doubled by instruments. Throughout the fantasia, whenever the cantus firmus is exposed, it is doubled by the horn. The other nine lines are punctuated by instrumental episodes of differing lengths. Some are quite short, where other pairs of instruments briefly play the first theme. For line 2, the tenor, followed by the alto, sing the cantus firmus in diminution, i.e. sung at twice the speed, with dotted crotchets instead of minims. Line 5 is similar, but this time the alto is followed by the tenor. In the episode between lines 2 and 3, the second themes are heard. Between lines 3 and 4 there is a recurrence of the sinfonia with different solo instruments allocated to the parts. Between lines 4 and 5, there is a two bar episode with the first theme; and between lines 5 and 6, the second theme is heard again. The vocal lines 4–6 are a repetition of lines 1–3, reflecting the over-arching bar form of the movement.

The extended instrumental passage between lines 6 and 7 features a duet between the two concertante violins, with the first theme countering the semiquaver bariolage. In line 7 the word "lieblich" ('lovely') is sung to plain chords in the choir, punctuated by one bar of the first theme; in line 8 the same happens for the word "freundlich" ('kindly'). After a two-bar episode similar to the violin duet, the whole orchestra and chorus are heard in line 9, with rolling quavers, in contrary motion. A 4-bar episode for the concertante violins leads to fugal entries in the lower voices and the climactic tenth line: with animated accompaniment from the entire orchestra and lower voices, the sopranos sing a descending scale to the words "Hoch und sehr prächtig erhaben" ('high and most sublime in splendour'). The orchestral ritornello closes the movement.

Dürr and Richard Jones write that the chorale fantasia is "a movement of jubilant splendour, colourful profusion, and Advent joy". W. Gillies Whittaker describes the long movement as "one of the most unforgettable pictures in musical art" with "kaleidoscopic changes of the fascinating material".

==== 2 ====
The tenor expresses in secco recitative the belief "Du wahrer Gottes und Marien Sohn" ('You, very son of God and Mary'). The text is crafted paraphrasing the second stanza of the hymn, and also alludes to the annunciation from the Gospel reading.

==== 3 ====
In the first aria, the soprano renders "Erfüllet, ihr himmlischen göttlichen Flammen" ('Fill utterly, you divine celestial flames'), accompanied by an obbligato oboe da caccia, an instrument in alto range. The instruments illustrate the celestial flames in coloraturas. Two oboe parts exist for the obbligato instrument, one in the normal clef for an oboe da caccia, the other in a "fingering notation". Ulrich Leisinger, editor of a publication by Carus, noted that it is unclear if the latter was meant to help a player not experienced in the instrument, or if actually two players alternated, which would make breathing easier.

==== 4 ====
In another secco recitative, "Ein irdscher Glanz, ein leiblich Licht rührt meine Seele nicht" ('No earthly gloss, no fleshly light could ever stir my soul'), the bass contrasts earthly light with heavenly light. The terms "Freudenschein" ('joyful radiance') and "Erquickung" ('refreshment') are emphasised by a melisma. Editor Leisinger summarised: "Nothing worldly pleases the soul, only that semblance of joy which is sent by God alone (for which the morning star can evidently serve as an image)".

==== 5 ====
The text of the fifth movement, "Unser Mund und Ton der Saiten" ('Our mouths and the tones of strings'), paraphrases the stanza "Zwingt die Saiten in Cythara" ('Pluck the strings of the cittern'). The aria is sung by the tenor who, following the text, is accompanied by strings only, including the two solo violins from the first movement. An expression of thanks and praise, it is intensified by a dance-like motion, described as "graceful minuet pulse" by Bach scholar Klaus Hofmann. The soloist sings coloraturas on the repeated word "Gesang" ('singing').

==== 6 ====
The closing chorale, "Wie bin ich doch so herzlich froh" ('How heartily glad I am indeed'), is complemented by an independent part of the second horn, while the other instruments play colla parte with the four-part chorale sung by the choir. Thus, the last chorale cantata in the second cantata cycle reaches an "air of baroque festive splendour".

== Reception ==
When the composer died in 1750, the autograph composition scores of the chorale cantata cycle presumably went with Friedemann, Bach's eldest son, to Halle, where they were later sold: most of these manuscripts, including that of Wie schön leuchtet der Morgenstern, went lost without further trace. Bundles of original performance parts of the chorale cantatas, including Wie schön leuchtet der Morgenstern, were briefly owned by the composer's widow, Anna Magdalena, who sold them to the St. Thomas School. Apart from Bach's motets, these chorale cantatas were the only works of the composer which were performed with some continuity in Leipzig between the composer's death and the 19th-century Bach Revival. Over a century later, the St. Thomas School deposited the original performance part manuscripts of the chorale cantata cycle in the Bach Archive in Leipzig, for conservation.

Carl von Winterfeld's description of the cantata, published in 1847, focuses mostly on the composition's opening movement. Writing in the second half of the 19th century, Philipp Spitta listed 35 Bach chorale cantatas in alphabetical order in the second volume of his biography Johann Sebastian Bach, but assumed that all these works were composed late in Bach's career. He wrote: "In these thirty-five cantatas a series of the most beautiful and the best known Protestant chorales of the sixteenth and seventeenth centuries is subjected to elaborate treatment." He noted that in Wie schön leuchtet der Morgenstern, the chorale, which was not originally written for the occasion of the Annunciation, had to be connected by expanded poetry to the topic of the feast. Building on Spitta's educated guesswork about the time of origin of Bach's church cantatas—which was later proven to be largely mistaken—Reginald Lane Poole listed the cantata as the last one composed by Bach, thus ranging it as a very mature work.

In the 1906 Bach-Jahrbuch, the third yearbook of the Neue Bachgesellschaft, Woldemar Voigt wrote about the cantata:

Ein kostbares Stück, und wohl wert, die Gesamtausgabe der Werke S. Bachs zu eröffnen. Insbesondere gehört der einleitende figurierte Choral nach Stimmungsgehalt und Farbenreichtum zu den schönsten, und man wird trotz der unbestreitbaren Länge keinen Takt entbehren.

Translation:

A precious work, and well worth opening the complete edition of Bach's works. In particular, the introductory chorale fantasia is among the most beautiful in terms of mood and richness of colour, and one will not want to miss a single measure of it despite its considerable length.

The same Bach-Jahrbuch volume presents an overview of performances of Bach's works between late 1904 and early 1907: two are listed for Wie schön leuchtet der Morgenstern, one in Leipzig, and one at the Bethlehem Bach Festival in Pennsylvania. Albert Schweitzer, in his book J. S. Bach, published in 1908 and translated in 1911, still dated the chorale cantatas to 1734 and later. Schweitzer wrote in a short passage about the first movement of Wie schön leuchtet der Morgenstern that Bach's "music converts the text into an expression of mystical exuberance. In the orchestral accompaniment the themes of the separate hues of the chorale are largely employed as motives."

In 1950, the cantata was listed as BWV 1 in the Bach-Werke-Verzeichnis. Dürr's comprehensive study of the chronology of Bach's cantatas was first published in the late 1950s: in it, the cantata's time of origin was fixed to Bach's second year in Leipzig. In preparation of the 2018 Bachfest Leipzig, three Bach experts were asked to name their favourites among Bach's cantatas: Gardiner, Michael Maul (then the festival's new director), and Peter Wollny, the director of the Bach Archive. 15 cantatas appeared in the lists of all three, including Wie schön leuchtet der Morgenstern.

=== Publication ===
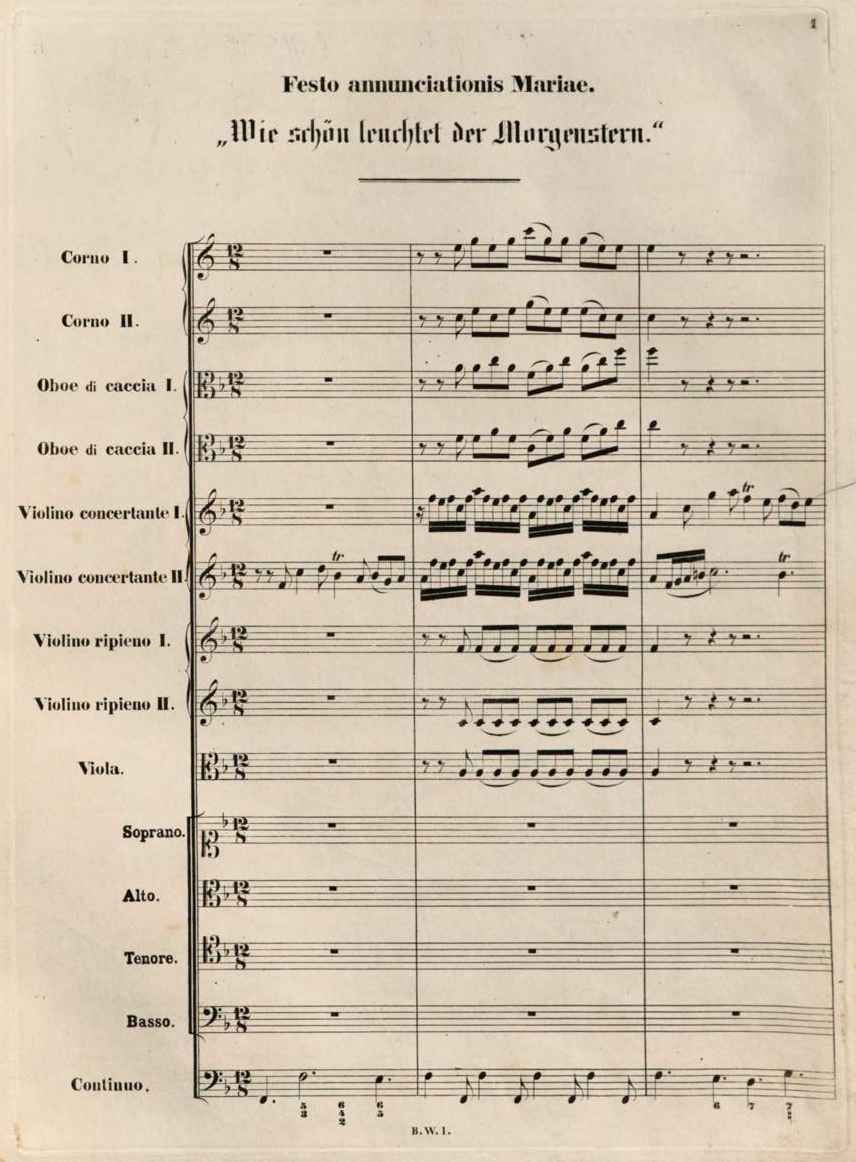
First page of the first volume of the Bach Gesellschaft edition (1851)

The Bach-Gesellschaft chose Wie schön leuchtet der Morgenstern as first composition in the first volume of the Bach-Gesellschaft Ausgabe (BGA). Robert Schumann, the publisher of the Neue Zeitschrift für Musik, Thomaskantor Moritz Hauptmann and philologist Otto Jahn had initiated this first complete edition of Bach's works a century after the composer's death. Its first volume was published in 1851, edited by Hauptmann. Leisinger mentioned three reasons why the Gesellschaft's choice to open their edition with this cantata made sense:

- The text of the cantata consisted of words and thoughtful paraphrases of a traditional chorale, countering mid-19th-century views that "wretched" late Baroque lyrics were an obstacle for reviving Bach's vocal music.
- The cantata's designation for a Marian feast could make it attractive for a Catholic audience too, thus helping to establish the nationwide importance of the BGA edition.
- Choosing a particularly well-crafted and mature composition, like this cantata, would add to the prestige of its composer, confirming the perception he had composed nothing but masterpieces.

Gustav Rösler prepared a vocal score for a publication by Edition Peters in Leipzig in 1875. Breitkopf & Härtel, the publisher of the BGA, began a series of vocal scores of Bach's cantatas, titled Joh. Seb. Bachs Kirchenkantaten, with this cantata appearing around 1890. They published another version in the same series around 1932, with an English text by Mevanwy Roberts, All glorious doth the day-star shine, a French text by Henriette Fuchs, Brillante étoile du matin, and a piano reduction by Günter Raphael. Possibly in 1928, a score of the cantata was published in the series Eulenburgs kleine Partitur-Ausgabe by Eulenburg in Leipzig; Arnold Schering had revised the BGA, based on the original vocal parts.

An English version was published in London as a vocal score, as part of Novello's Original Octavo Edition, possibly in 1927. The translation, titled How Brightly Shines yon Star of Morn was made by Paul England, and the piano reduction prepared by John E. West. In the U.S., a vocal score appeared in Philadelphia around 1947, titled How Bright and Fair the Morning Star, as No. 88 of the Choral Series of the Association of American Choruses. The New Bach Edition (Neue Bach-Ausgabe, NBA) published the work in 1995, edited by Matthias Wendt, with critical commentary added the same year. Carus published a critical edition in German and English as part of its Stuttgarter Bach-Ausgaben in 1998, edited by Reinhold Kubik. In the 21st century, Bach Digital published high-resolution facsimile images of the manuscript parts from the first quarter of the 18th century.

=== Recordings ===
The conductor Fritz Lehmann recorded Bach's cantatas with the Berliner Motettenchor and the Berliner Philharmoniker with Deutsche Grammophon in the early 1950s. The recordings of nine cantatas, including Wie schön leuchtet der Morgenstern, were reissued in 2018. Fritz Werner recorded around 50 of Bach's church cantatas with the Heinrich-Schütz-Chor Heilbronn and the Pforzheim Chamber Orchestra, mostly in the 1960s, including Wie schön leuchtet der Morgenstern.

In 1971, Wie schön leuchtet der Morgenstern was the first cantata recorded for the Teldec series—a project aiming to record all church cantatas by Bach on period instruments in historically informed performances, conducted by Nikolaus Harnoncourt and Gustav Leonhardt. All vocalists were male singers, as during Bach's tenure in Leipzig. Harnoncourt conducted the first four cantatas (BWV 1 to 4), with the Wiener Sängerknaben and the Concentus Musicus Wien, with a soprano soloist from the boys' choir and a countertenor for the alto part. Helmuth Rilling, who began a recording of all Bach cantatas in 1969 and completed it in 1985, recorded Wie schön leuchtet der Morgenstern in 1980, with the Gächinger Kantorei and Bach-Collegium Stuttgart.

Pieter Jan Leusink conducted all Bach church cantatas with the Holland Boys Choir and the Netherlands Bach Collegium in historically informed performance, but with women for the solo soprano parts. Gardiner, who in 2000 conducted the Bach Cantata Pilgrimage with the Monteverdi Choir, performing and recording Bach's church cantatas on the occasion for which they written, recorded Wie schön leuchtet der Morgenstern at St Peter's Church, Walpole St Peter. Masaaki Suzuki, who studied historically informed practice in Europe, began recording Bach's church cantatas with the Bach Collegium Japan in 1999, at first not aiming at a complete cycle, but completing all in 2017. They released Wie schön leuchtet der Morgenstern in 2007.

== Cited sources ==
By title

- "Annunciation: Christianity". Britannica. 6 February 2018.
- "D-LEb Thomana 1". Bach Digital. 13 January 2020.
- "Wie schön leuchtet der Morgenstern BWV 1". Bach Digital. 2 December 2020.
- "Wie schön leuchtet der Morgenstern". Hymns and Carols of Christmas. 19 March 2019.

By author

- Ambrose, Z. Philip. "BWV 1 Wie schön leuchtet der Morgenstern". University of Vermont.
- Cantagrel, Gilles (2010). "Wie schön leuchtet der Morgenstern" [Comme elle resplendit, l’étoile du matin !]. Les cantates de J.-S.Bach : textes, traductions, commentaires (in French). Fayard. pp. 1166–1172. ISBN 978-2-213-66075-2.
- Dahn, Luke (2019). "BWV 1.6". bach-chorales.com.
- Dellal, Pamela. "BWV 1 – 'Wie schön leuchtet der Morgenstern'". Emmanuel Music.
- Dörffel, Alfred, ed. (1878). Thematisches Verzeichniss der Kirchencantaten No. 1–120. Bach-Gesellschaft Ausgabe (in German). Vol. 27. Leipzig: Breitkopf & Härtel. pp. V–IX.
- Dürr, Alfred (1958). "Zur Chronologie der Leipziger Vokalwerke J. S. Bachs". In Dürr, Alfred; Neumann, Werner (eds.). Bach-Jahrbuch 1957. Bach-Jahrbuch (in German). Vol. 44. Neue Bachgesellschaft. Berlin: Evangelische Verlagsanstalt. pp. 5–162. doi:10.13141/bjb.v19571520 – via Qucosa.
- Dürr, Alfred; Jones, Richard D. P. (2006). "3.2 The Feast of the Annunciation (25 March)". The Cantatas of J. S. Bach: With Their Librettos in German-English Parallel Text. Oxford: Oxford University Press. pp. 666–670. ISBN 978-0-19-969628-4.
- Fischer, Michael (2006). "Wie schön leuchtet der Morgenstern". Freiburger Anthologie Lied und Lyrik (in German). Archived from the original on 2012-03-09.
- Freeman-Attwood, Jonathan (April 2001). "Bach Cantatas, Volume 9 / The end of a series recorded on a shoestring but still containing many beautiful offerings". Gramophone.
- Fulker, Rick (12 June 2018). "Music / Everything you need to know about the Bach cantatas". Deutsche Welle.
- Gardiner, John Eliot (2006). Johann Sebastian Bach 1685–1750 / Cantatas Vol 21: Cambridge/Walpole St Pete (PDF) (Media notes). Monteverdi Choir. pp. 21–22.
- Gardiner, John Eliot (2013). Music in the Castle of Heaven: A Portrait of Johann Sebastian Bach. London: Penguin Books. pp. 256–257. ISBN 978-1-84-614721-0.
- Henahan, Donal (12 December 1971). "J. S. Bach: As He Originally Was". The New York Times. p. 31.
- Hofmann, Klaus (2006). "Wie schön leuchtet der Morgenstern / How beautifully shines the morning star, BWV 1". Bach, Johann Sebastian (1685–1750) / Cantatas 34 · Leipzig 1725 (liner notes). BIS Records. pp. 5–6.
- Jones, Richard D. P. (2007). "Leipzig Cycle II: chorale cantatas". The Creative Development of Johann Sebastian Bach, Volume II: 1717–1750. Oxford: Oxford University Press. pp. 142–157. ISBN 978-0-19-816440-1.
- Kemp, Lindsay (18 April 2017). "Recording Bach's Cantatas, with Masaaki Suzuki and Bach Collegium Japan". Gramophone.
- Kenney, Sylvia W., ed. (1960). "Cantatas". Catalog of the Emilie and Karl Riemenschneider Memorial Bach Library. New York City: Columbia University Press. pp. 56–57.
- Kenyon, Sir Nicholas (2011). "Leipzig Cycle II: chorale cantatas". The Faber Pocket Guide to Bach. London: Faber and Faber. p. 268. ISBN 978-0-57-127200-6.
- Lehmann, Fritz (2018). Bach: Nine Sacred Cantatas (CD). Eloquence. 4827642. 8133493 at jpc.
- Leisinger, Ulrich (1998). Johann Sebastian Bach / Wie schön leuchtet der Morgenstern / How beauteous is the morning star / BWV 1 (PDF). Translated by Kosviner, David. Stuttgart: Carus-Verlag. pp. 3–4.
- Marissen, Michael (2014). Tainted Glory in Handel's Messiah: The Unsettling History of the World's Most Beloved Choral Work. Yale University Press. ISBN 978-0-300-20699-9.
- Marshall, Robert L. (January 1973). "Review of Records / Johann Sebastian Bach: The Complete Cantatas, Volume 1". The Musical Quarterly. 59 (1): 145–159. doi:10.1093/mq/LIX.1.145. JSTOR 741467.
- Neue Bachgesellschaft, ed. (1906). "Übersicht der Aufführungen J. S. Bachscher Werke von Ende 1904 bis Anfang 1907". Bach-Jahrbuch 1906 [Bach-Yearbook 1906]. Bach-Jahrbuch (in German). Vol. 3. Leipzig: Breitkopf & Härtel. pp. 115–129. doi:10.13141/bjb.v19061048.
- Poole, Reginald Lane (1882). "A List of Church Cantatas in Presumed Order of Production". Sebastian Bach. London: Sampson Low, Marston, Searle, & Rivington. pp. 131–138.
- Quinn, John (November 2004). "Review of Records / Johann Sebastian Bach: The Complete Cantatas, Volume 1". musicweb-international.com.
- Rilling, Helmuth (1981). Herr Jesu Christ, Wahr' Mensch und Gott: BWV 127 – Wie schön leuchtet der Morgenstern: BWV 1 (LP). Hänssler. OCLC 313016652.
- Schmieder, Wolfgang, ed. (1950). Thematisch-systematisches Verzeichnis der musikalischen Werke von Johann Sebastian Bach: Bach-Werke-Verzeichnis [Thematic-Systematic Catalogue of the Musical Works of Johann Sebastian Bach: Bach-Works-Catalogue] (in German) (BWV^{1} ed.). Leipzig: Breitkopf & Härtel. OCLC 963027464.
- Schweitzer, Albert (1911). J. S. Bach. Translated by Newman, Ernest. London: A & C Black. p. 362.
- Spitta, Philipp (1884). "III: The later Chorale Cantatas". Johann Sebastian Bach: His Work and Influence on the Music of Germany, 1685–1750. Translated by Bell, Clara; Fuller Maitland, J. A. London: Novello & Co. pp. 64–108.
- Stalmann, Joachim (2000). "Wie schön leuchtet der Morgenstern". In Hahn, Gerhard; Henkys, Jürgen (eds.). Liederkunde zum Evangelischen Gesangbuch (in German). Göttingen: Vandenhoeck & Ruprecht. pp. 42–52. ISBN 978-3-52-550325-6.
- Suzuki, Masaaki (2007). J.S. Bach – Cantatas, Vol.34 (BWV 1, 126, 127) (SACD Hybrid). BIS Records. Archived from the original on 2021-10-16.
- Voigt, Woldemar (1906). "Erfahrungen und Ratschläge bezüglich der Aufführung Bachscher Kirchenkantaten". In Neue Bachgesellschaft (ed.). Bach-Jahrbuch 1906 [Bach-Yearbook 1906]. Bach-Jahrbuch (in German). Vol. 3. Leipzig: Breitkopf & Härtel. pp. 1–42. doi:10.13141/bjb.v19061043.
- Vopelius, Gottfried (1682). Neu Leipziger Gesangbuch. Leipzig: Klinger. p. 814.
- Whittaker, W. Gillies (1978). "Cantata No. 1". The Cantatas of Johann Sebastian Bach: Sacred and Secular. Vol. II (Reprint ed.). Oxford: Oxford University Press. pp. 104–110. ISBN 978-0-19-315238-0.
- Winterfeld, Carl von (1847). Der Evangelische Kirchengesang im achtzehnten Jahrhunderte. Der evangelische Kirchengesang und sein Verhältniss zur Kunst des Tonsatzes (in German). Vol. III. Leipzig: Breitkopf & Härtel. pp. 337–339.
- Wolff, Christoph (2002). Johann Sebastian Bach: The Learned Musician. Oxford: Oxford University Press. ISBN 978-0-393-32256-9.
- Zahn, Johannes (1892). Die Melodien der deutschen evangelischen Kirchenlieder (in German). Vol. V. Gütersloh: Bertelsmann.
