= Ich freue mich in dir, BWV 133 =

1724 church cantata by Johann Sebastian Bach

Ich freue mich in dir
- BWV 133
- Chorale cantata by J. S. Bach
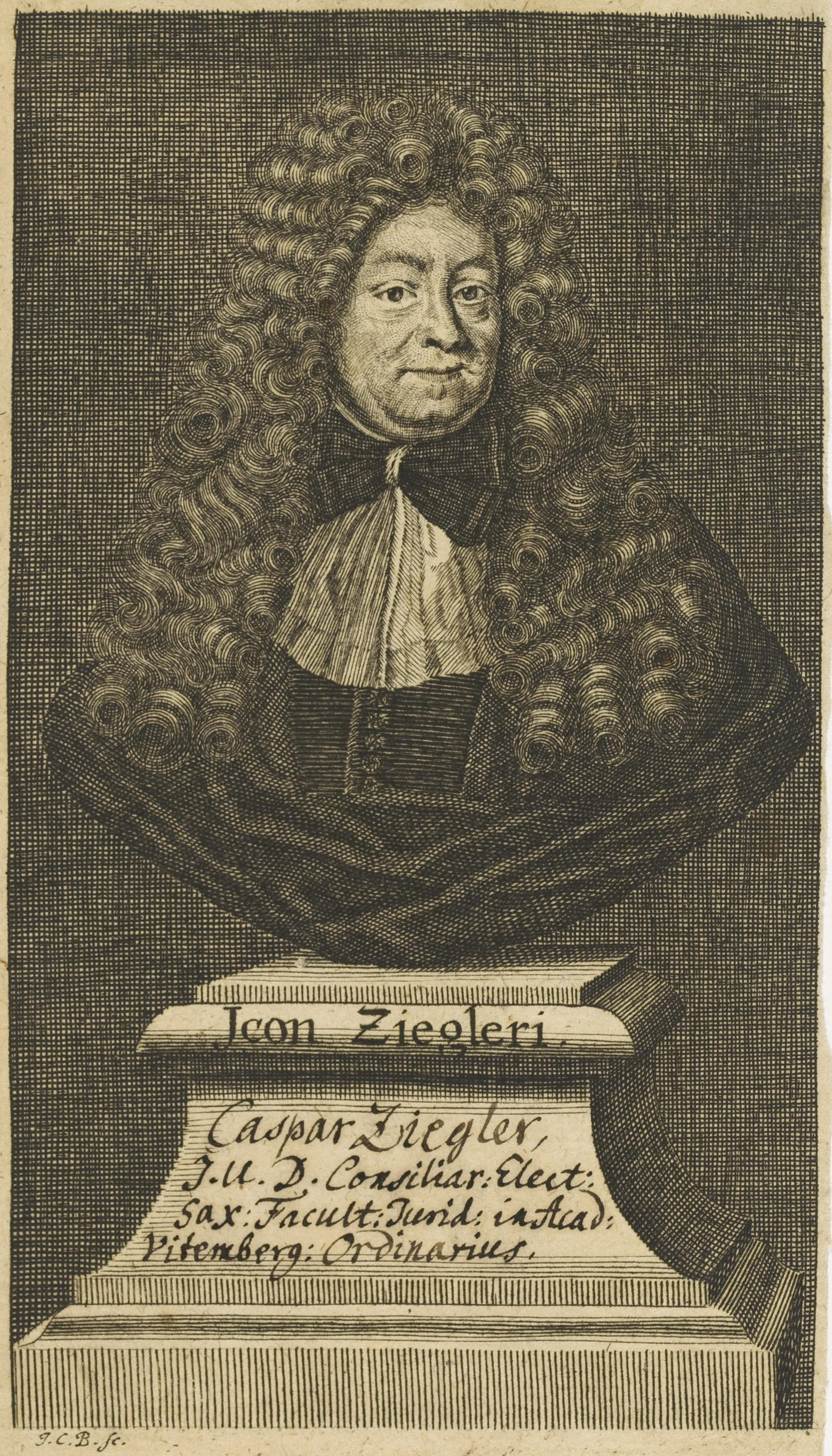
- Engraving of Ziegler who wrote the chorale text
- Occasion: Third Day of Christmas
- Chorale: "Ich freue mich in dir by Caspar Ziegler
- Performed: 27 December 1724: Leipzig
- Movements: 6
- Vocal: SATB choir and solo
- Instrumental: cornett; 2 oboes d'amore; 2 violins; viola; continuo

Ich freue mich in dir (I rejoice in You), BWV 133, (Note: "BWV" is Bach-Werke-Verzeichnis, a thematic catalogue of Bach's works.) is a church cantata by Johann Sebastian Bach. He composed the Christmas cantata in Leipzig in 1724 for the Third Day of Christmas and first performed it on 27 December 1724. It is based on the 1697 hymn of the same name by Caspar Ziegler. The cantata is part of Bach's chorale cantata cycle, the second cycle during his tenure as Thomaskantor that began in 1723. The hymn is among the most modern that Bach used within the cycle. Instead of dealing with the nativity story it is focused on an intimate relationship of the individual believer and the Christ child.

In the style of the chorale cantata cycle, an unknown poet retained the outer stanzas for framing choral movements and paraphrased the middle stanza into four movements for soloists, alternating arias and recitatives. In this case, two recitatives also end in the exact wording from the chorale.

Bach scored the work for four soloists, a four-part choir and a Baroque instrumental ensemble of a cornetto to reinforce the chorale tune, two oboes d'amore, strings and basso continuo. The choir has only a rather small part, explained by the two demanding new cantatas first performed the two previous days.

== History and words ==
Bach wrote the chorale cantata in his second year as Thomaskantor in Leipzig, as part of his second cantata cycle, the chorale cantata cycle, for the Third Day of Christmas. The prescribed readings for the feast day were from the Epistle to the Hebrews, Christ is higher than the angels, (Hebrews 1:1–14) and the prologue of the Gospel of John, also called Hymn to the Word (John 1:1–14). The cantata is based on the chorale in four stanzas Ich freue mich in dir (1697) by Caspar Ziegler. It is one of the newest of the chorales which served as a base for the cycle, whereas Bach otherwise preferred the beloved hymns of poets such as Martin Luther and Paul Gerhardt. In the format of the cycle, the unknown poet of the cantata text retained the first and the last stanzas for choral movements, and paraphrased the inner stanzas closely to a sequence of arias and recitative. Two movements were formed from the ideas of the second stanza, and the following two movements were derived from the third stanza. The librettist retained several lines as part of the recitatives, and Bach highlighted them by arioso treatment. The text has no reference to the readings nor to the feast of John the Evangelist. It expresses the intimate joy of the individual believer about the presence of God in the Jesus child.

Bach led the Thomanerchor in the first performance of the cantata on 27 December 1724. Bach's Thomaskantor successor Gottlob Harrer performed the cantata after Bach's death.

== Music ==
=== Scoring and structure ===
Bach structured Ich freue mich in dir in six movements. Both the text and the tune of the hymn are retained in the outer movements, a chorale fantasia and a four-part closing chorale. Bach scored the work for four vocal soloists (soprano (S), alto (A), tenor (T) and bass (B)), a four-part choir, and a Baroque instrumental ensemble of a cornett (Ct) to double the chorale melody, two oboes d'amore (Oa), two violin parts (Vl), one viola part (Va), and basso continuo. The duration of the cantata is given as 20 minutes.

In the following table of the movements, the scoring, keys and time signatures are taken from Alfred Dürr's standard work Die Kantaten von Johann Sebastian Bach. The continuo, which plays throughout, is not shown.

Movements of Ich freue mich in dir
No.	Title	Type	Vocal	Winds	Strings	Key	Time
1	Ich freue mich in dir	Chorus	SATB	Ct 2Oa	2Vl Va	D major	common time
2	Getrost! es faßt ein heil'ger Leib	Aria	A	2Oa		A major	cut time
3	Ein Adam mag sich voller Schrecken	Recitative	T				common time
4	Wie lieblich klingt es in den Ohren	Aria	S		2Vl Va	B minor	12/8
5	Wohlan, des Todes Furcht und Schmerz	Recitative	B				common time
6	Wohlan, so will ich mich	Chorale	SATB	Ct 2Oa	2Vl Va	D major	common time

=== Movements ===
The chorale is sung on a variant of a melody of O Gott, du frommer Gott. This melody was probably new to Bach who noted it in the score of the Sanctus, which he also composed for Christmas in 1724 and later made part of his Mass in B minor. The song became part of the Leipzig hymnal only after 1730.

While Bach's Weimar cantata Christen, ätzet diesen Tag, BWV 63, expressed a communal joy in two choral movements and two duets, a sequence of four movements for a single voice reflects the joy of the individual believer.

==== 1 ====
In the opening chorale fantasia, "Ich freue mich in dir und heiße dich willkommen" (I rejoice in you and bid you welcome), the cornetto plays the cantus firmus with the soprano, the oboes play in unison with violin II and viola, whereas violin 1 "shines above the rest". The orchestra carries the expression of joyful excitement. The lower voices are set mostly in homophony, with the exception of expressing "Der große Gottessohn" (the great son of God). The voices thus have little work, which can be explained by this cantata being the third new cantata performed on three consecutive days.

John Eliot Gardiner, who conducted the Bach Cantata Pilgrimage in 2000, summarised: "I find it hard to imagine music that conveys more persuasively the essence, the exuberance and the sheer exhilaration of Christmas than the opening chorus of BWV 133".

==== 2 ====
The alto aria, "Getrost! es faßt ein heil'ger Leib des Höchsten unbegreiflichs Wesen." (Be comforted! A holy body contains the unfathomable being of the Highest), is accompanied by the two oboes d'amore. Motifs of runs as in the opening still occur in the aria, but it is dominated by a repeated call of the oboes, in "rhythmically accented ascending interval leaps", that the voice sings to the word "Getrost".

==== 3 ====
The tenor recitative, "Ein Adam mag sich voller Schrecken vor Gottes Angesicht im Paradies verstecken" (An Adam might well, filled with terror, from God's countenance hide himself in Paradise), is marked adagio twice for text quoted from the original chorale, once to stress "Der allerhöchste Gotte kehrt selber bei uns ein" (Almighty God Himself here visits us), and the conclusion, "Wird er ein kleines Kind und heißt mein Jesulein" (He has become a little child and is called my little Jesus). In these highlighted passages, the music is close to the chorale tune but not an exact quote.

==== 4 ====
The soprano aria, "Wie lieblich klingt es in den Ohren, dies Wort: mein Jesus ist geboren" (How beautifully it rings in my ears, this word: my Jesus is born), is accompanied by the strings. It begins and ends in an even time in the outer sections; the first violin alone begins with a run. In the middle section the time shifts to a siciliano, the tempo to adagio, and it is unusually played without continuo, just a trio of the soprano, the first violin and the lower strings in unison. It illustrates the beautiful sounds of which the text speaks, and also, by lack of a bass, the denial of Jesus from the inn.

==== 5 ====
The bass recitative, "Wohlan, des Todes Furcht und Schmerz erwägt nicht mein getröstet Herz." (Indeed, my encouraged heart will not dwell upon the fear and pain of death), expresses no more fear of death. Formally it is similar to the first recitative, quoting from the chorale in the end, highlighted musically as arioso with a melody similar but not identical to the chorale tune.

==== 6 ====
The cantata is closed by a four-part setting of the last chorale stanza, "Wohlan, so will ich mich an dich, o Jesu, halten" (Indeed, thus I will cling to you, O Jesus).

== Manuscripts and publication ==
Bach's autograph score of the cantata and the original parts, which he revised himself, are extant. The score and a set of duplicate parts were inherited by his son Wilhelm Friedemann Bach. In 1827, the score was sold at auction in Berlin with several other Bach cantata autographs and manuscripts to Carl Pistor. Pistor invited Mendelssohn to catalog the auction materials, which became the original autographs in the vast Rudorff collection; in return Pistor gifted the autograph of BWV 133 to Mendelssohn. It went finally to the Royal Library in Berlin. The original parts were inherited by Bach's widow Anna Magdalena Bach who quickly sold them to the Thomasschule.

The cantata was first published in 1881 in the first complete edition of Bach's work, the Bach-Gesellschaft Ausgabe. The volume in question was edited by Wilhelm Rust. In the Neue Bach-Ausgabe it was published in 2000, edited by Andreas Glöckner.

== Recordings ==
A list of recordings is provided on the Bach Cantatas Website. Instrumental groups playing period instruments in historically informed performances are marked by green background.

Recordings of Ich freue mich in dir
Title	Conductor / Choir / Orchestra	Soloists	Label	Year	Instr.
J. S. Bach: Cantatas BWV 122 & BWV 133	Michael Gielen Wiener Kammerchor Vienna State Opera Orchestra	Margit Opawsky; Hilde Rössel-Majdan; Waldemar Kmentt; Harald Hermann	Vanguard Bach Guild	1952	
Die Bach Kantate Vol. 64	Helmuth Rilling Gächinger Kantorei Bach-Collegium Stuttgart	Arleen Augér; Doris Soffel; Aldo Baldin; Philippe Huttenlocher	Hänssler	1980	
J. S. Bach: Das Kantatenwerk • Complete Cantatas • Les Cantates, Folge / Vol. 7	Gustav Leonhardt Knabenchor Hannover Concentus Musicus Wien	Soloist of the Knabenchor Hannover; René Jacobs; Marius van Altena; Max van Egmond	Teldec	1973	Period
Bach Edition Vol. 4 – Cantatas Vol. 1	Pieter Jan Leusink Holland Boys Choir Netherlands Bach Collegium	Ruth Holton; Sytse Buwalda; Knut Schoch; Bas Ramselaar	Brilliant Classics	1999	Period
J. S. Bach: Complete Cantatas Vol. 13	Ton Koopman Amsterdam Baroque Orchestra & Choir	Deborah York; Franziska Gottwald; Paul Agnew; Klaus Mertens	Antoine Marchand	2000	Period
Bach Cantatas Vol. 15: New York / For the 3rd Day of Christmas	John Eliot Gardiner Monteverdi Choir English Baroque Soloists	Katharine Fuge; Robin Tyson; James Gilchrist; Peter Harvey	Soli Deo Gloria	2000	Period
J. S. Bach: Christmas Cantatas from Leipzig	Philippe Herreweghe Collegium Vocale Gent	Dorothee Mields; Ingeborg Danz; Mark Padmore; Peter Kooy	Harmonia Mundi	2001	Period
J. S. Bach: Cantatas Vol. 31	Masaaki Suzuki Bach Collegium Japan	Yukari Nonoshita; Robin Blaze; Gerd Türk; Peter Kooy	BIS	2004	Period
