= Friedrich Wilhelm Rust =

German violinist, pianist and composer (1739–1796)

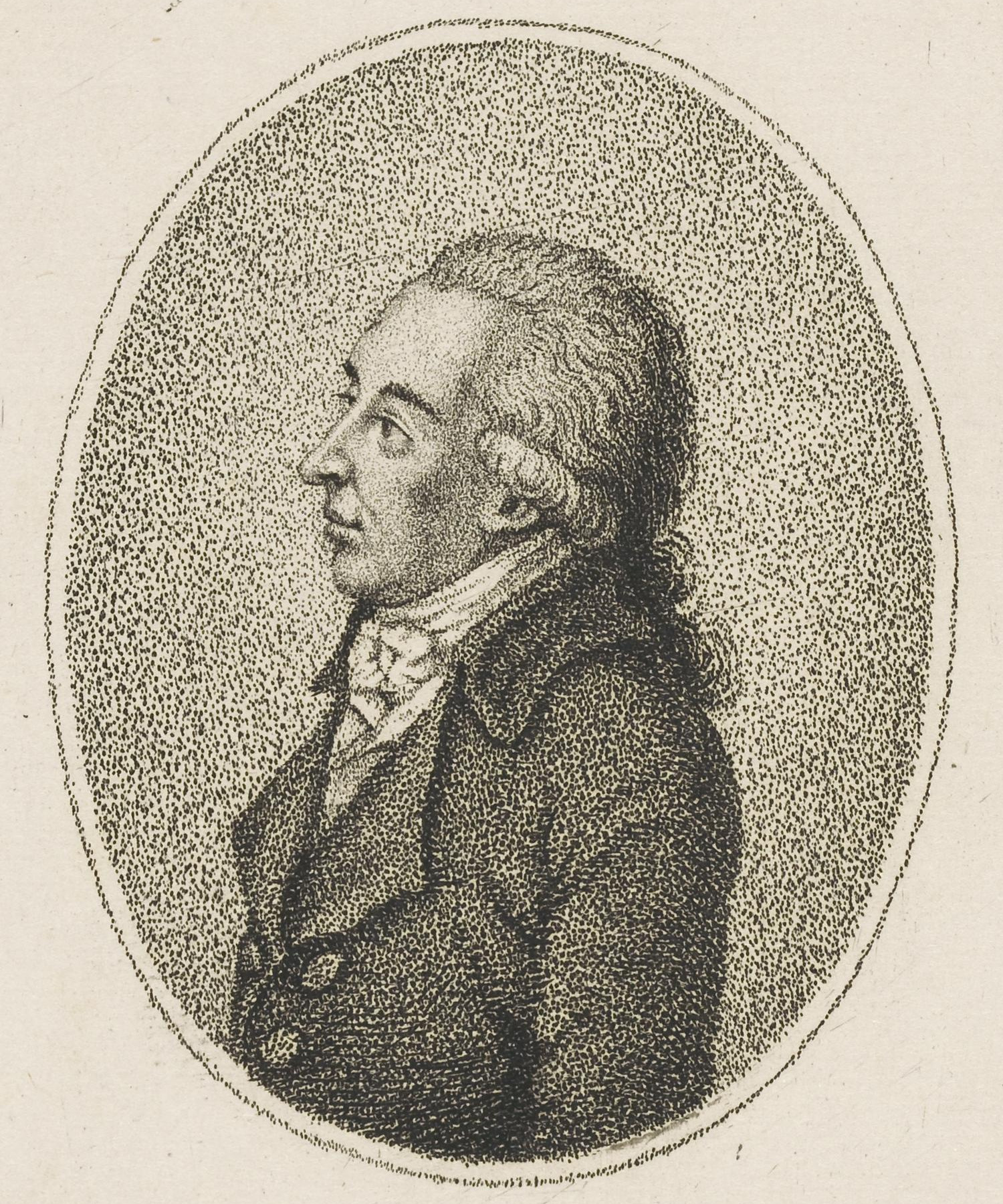
- Born: Friedrich Wilhelm Rust; 6 July 1739; Wörlitz, Anhalt-Dessau, Holy Roman Empire
- Died: 28 February 1796 (aged 56); Wörlitz, Holy Roman Empire
- Spouse: Henriette Niedhart

Friedrich Wilhelm Rust (6 July 1739 – 28 February 1796) was a German violinist, pianist and composer. He hailed from a renowned musical family in Germany. He was the father of the pianist and organist Wilhelm Karl Rust and the grandfather of Thomaskantor, composer and Bach scholar Wilhelm Rust.

== Life ==
He was born in Wörlitz in Anhalt-Dessau (now in Saxony-Anhalt) on 6 July 1739. Encouraged to study violin, Rust was taught early on by his older brother, Johann Ludwig Anton, who was an accomplished musician with J.S. Bach's orchestra and played as a violinist in Leipzig. Rust also studied piano, particularly the works of Johann Sebastian Bach; he was able to play his collection of preludes and fugues in all keys Das Wohltemperierte Clavier from memory at the age of 13 or 16, according to other sources. His father, a princely Kammerrat and bailiff, died in 1751, and he moved with his mother and brother to Gröbzig. He attended the Lutheran gymnasium in Cöthen beginning in 1755, and from 1758 took law at University of Halle. During this period, he studied composition and organ with Wilhelm Friedemann Bach, who he described as "stingy with his art". From 1762, he took music lessons with Carl Höckh in Zerbst, and with Carl Philipp Emanuel Bach and Franz Benda in Berlin and Potsdam.

In 1765–66, he accompanied Leopold III, Duke of Anhalt-Dessau, on a trip to Italy. While there, he trained with Giovanni Battista Martini, Pietro Nardini, Gaetano Pugnani, Giuseppe Tartini and Georg Benda. He also became interested in the viola d'amore, for which he would compose at least nine pieces.

In 1766, he returned to Dessau, where he worked as an educator and music organizer. He created a subscription concert series in 1769, and on September 24, 1774, he founded an opera theatre. In 1774, Rust was made court music director and married Henriette Niedhardt, a former pupil, who was a singer, with whom he had eight children. His eldest son died in a drowning accident and his youngest son, Wilhelm Karl, became a well known music instructor. He met Goethe in 1776, who was "deeply impressed" by the composer. His Sonata per il Clavicordio all imitazione de Timpani del Salterio e del Liuto (1792) was considered interesting in part because of its imitation of the timpani by the tremolo effect.

Rust died in Dessau on 28 February 1796, aged 56.

== Legacy ==
After his death, Rust's music was largely unknown and unrecognized. In 1882, W. Hofäus and Dr. E. Prieger published a pamphlet titled "F.W. Rust, ein Vorgänger Beethovens", with a monograph. Rust re-emerged in the public consciousness after 1885, when his grandson Wilhelm Rust edited and republished fourteen of his sonatas. Wilhelm claimed that his grandfather deserved to be recognized as a key precursor to Romantic music, although some critics challenged his assessment because of a lack of clarity over what elements in the edited works were original and which were added by Wilhelm. The sonatas were of interest as they appeared to be advanced for Rust's time, incorporating harmonic changes as well as counterpoint and even measures. Vincent d'Indy was also a proponent of Rust's work. He suggested that Rust was "the connecting link between Haydn and Mozart on the one hand, Beethoven on the other". Edmund van der Straeten wrote on "Some Unpublished Compositions of F. W. Rust" in 1896 and "The Violin Sonatas of Frederic Wilhelm Rust" in 1926. Two recitals of Rust's compositions were presented in Paris in 1897 by Marie-Aimée Roger-Miclos.

Wilhelm bequeathed his grandfather's autograph manuscripts to the Royal Library of Berlin. Rust also had a large collection of works by J.S. Bach, which Wilhelm used in his edited publications for the Bachgesellschaft (Bach Society). His collection contained handwritten transcripts, copies of other contemporaries, as well as printed copies, of more than 90 individual works (including BWV 525–530, 802–805, 846–869), and exclusively instrumental works, mainly for keyboard. After Rust's death, the collection was initially owned by the family and is now part of the Johann-Sebastian-Bach-Institut in Göttingen.

== Works ==
Rust's oeuvre comprises every genre of the time except symphony. He wrote several large choral works, 100 lieder, and pieces for clavichord, viola d'amore, harp, lute, and "nail violin". His cantatas, included Herr Gott, wir loben dich and Allgnädiger, in allen Höhen, and songs included Goethe's Wanderers Nachtlied. He composed a Schäferspiel, Korylas und Lalage, and technically demanding violin and piano works (including six sonatas). During the last twelve years of his life he composed more sacred music. His musical forte covered psalm settings for solo, chorus and orchestra, duodramas and monodramas. He also composed music for dramas and operas.
