= Caspar Ziegler =

German jurist, poet and composer (1621–1690)

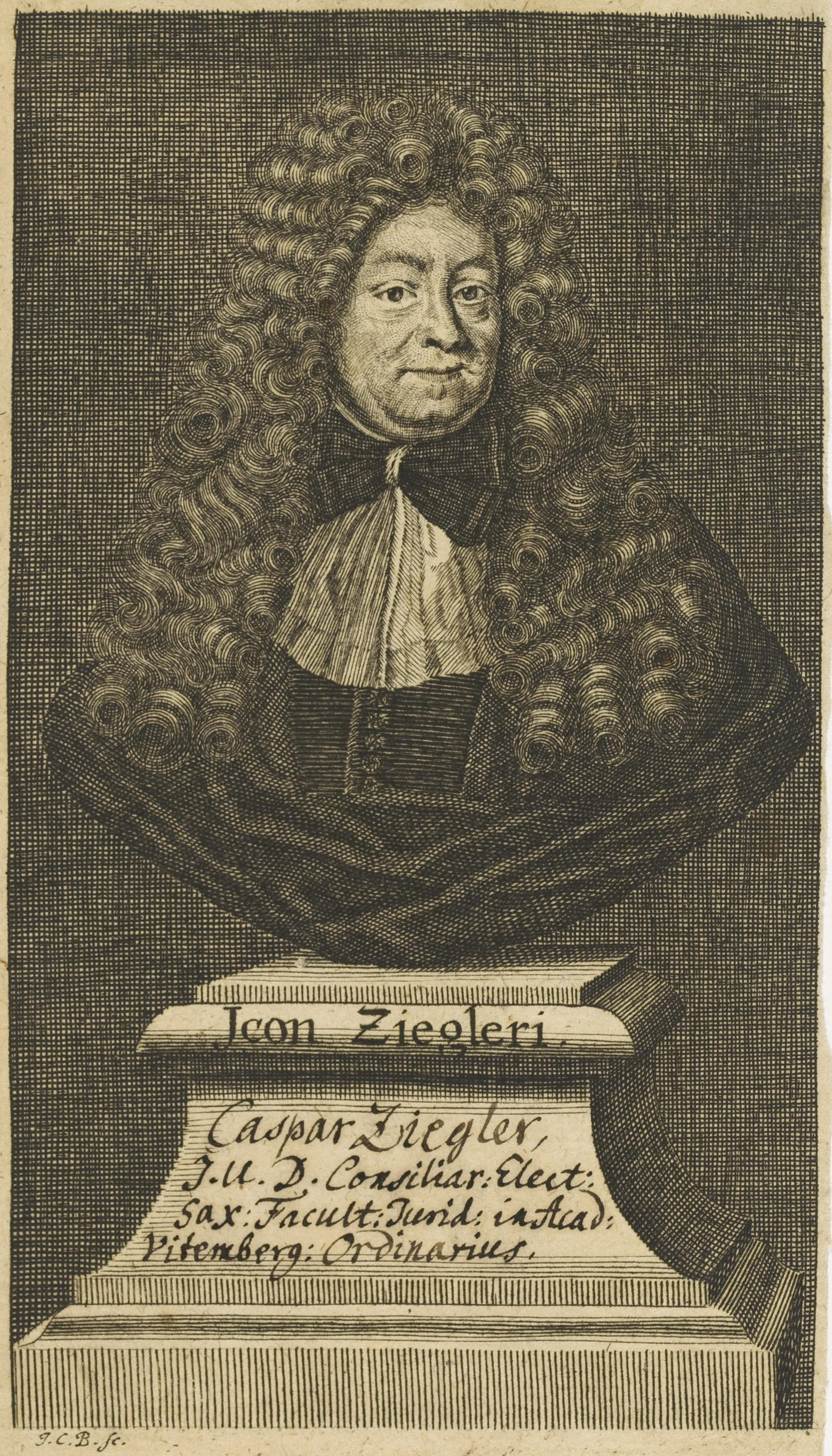
- Engraving of Ziegler
- Born: 15 September 1621; Leipzig
- Died: 17 April 1690 (aged 68); Wittenberg
- Education: University of Leipzig; University of Wittenberg
- Occupations: Jurist; Poet; Hymnwriter; Composer; University director
- Organization: University of Wittenberg

Caspar Ziegler, also Kaspar Ziegler, (15 September 1621 – 17 April 1690) was a German jurist, poet, hymnwriter and composer. He was the Rektor of the University of Wittenberg.

== Career ==
Ziegler was born in Leipzig the son of Caspar Ziegler sr., a lawyer and Prokonsul in the town council, and his wife Anna (née Walter, the widow of Johann Kürsten). He studied at the University of Leipzig.

In 1638, Ziegler was a Baccalaureus of philosophy, permitted to lecture at the university. His father requested him to move to the University of Wittenberg in 1641, where he heard lectures by August Buchner, Johannes Scharff, Johann Sperling and Nikolaus Pompejus. As his parents wished him to study theology, he also studied with Hieronymus Kronmeyer and Johann Hülsemann. In November 1652, he began to study law in Leipzig with Polycarp Wirth and Andreas Eckholt. In 1655, he received the doctor's degree in law.

In 1654, he was appointed professor at the University of Wittenberg, at the same to the court. In 1661, he was appointed Rektor (director) of the University. He reorganized its library which had been destroyed during the Thirty Years' War.

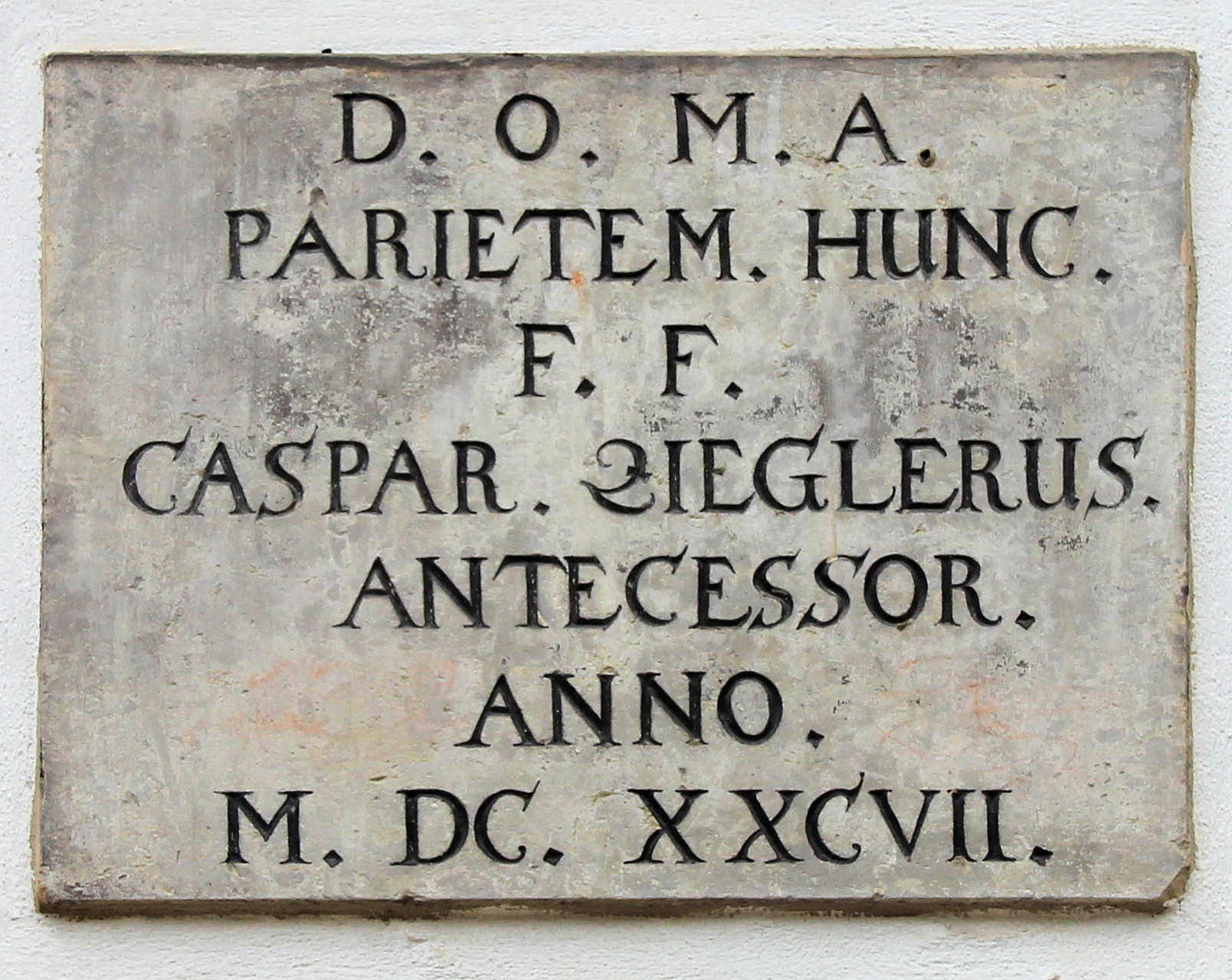
Memorial plaque at the house Markt 4 in Wittenberg

He died in Wittenberg after an infection from a broken leg, and was buried in the Schlosskirche on 24 April 1690.

== Works ==
Some poems by Ziegler were set to music. He was a friend of the composers Johann Rosenmüller and Heinrich Schütz and collaborated with them. Ziegler wrote a treatise about madrigals, Von den Madrigalen, published in 1653, as requested by Schütz His poem "Ich freue mich in dir" (I rejoice in you) became a hymn and was the basis for Johann Sebastian Bach's chorale cantata for Christmas Ich freue mich in dir, BW 133.

Among his works are:

- Jesus oder zwanzig Elegien über Geburth, Leiden u. Auferstehung unseres Herrn. Leipzig 1648
- Von den Madrigalen ... Leipzig 1653, Wittenberg 1685 Online, Frankfurt am Main 1971
- De dote ecclesiae – diatribe canonica
- De iuribus Majestatis Wittenberg 1681
- Rabulistica sive de artibus rabulariis. Dresden 1685
- Notae et animadversiones Wittenberg 1686

== Bibliography ==
- Christian von Bar, Peter Dopffel (ed.): Deutsches internationales Privatrecht im 16. Und 17. Jahrhundert. vol. 1, p. 561 Digitalisat
- Walther Killy: (1992) Literaturlexikon: Autoren und Werke deutscher Sprache. Gütersloh München: Bertelsmann-Lexikon-Verl vol. 12, p. 487 ISBN 3-570-04682-6
- Walter Friedensburg: Geschichte der Universität Wittenberg. Niemeyer, Halle/Saale 1917
- Fritz Roth: Restlose Auswertungen von Leichenpredigten und Personalschriften für genealogische und kulturhistorische Zwecke. vol. 6, R 5095
- Max von Waldberg (1900). "Ziegler, Kaspar" . Allgemeine Deutsche Biographie (in German). Vol. 45. Leipzig: Duncker & Humblot. pp. 184–187.
- Ziegler, Caspar ein Doctor der Rechten auf der Universität zu Wittenberg Grosses vollständiges Universal-Lexicon, vol. 62, Leipzig 1749, col. 559–574.
