= Wilhelm Karl Rust =

German pianist (1787–1855)

- Born: 29 April 1787; Dessau, Germany
- Died: 18 April 1855 (aged 67)
- Occupation: Classical pianist

Wilhelm Karl Rust (29 April 1787 – 18 April 1855) was a German pianist.

Rust was born in Dessau to Friedrich Wilhelm Rust, a prominent musician and composer. He was praised for his precocious musical abilities, being dubbed "A New Musical Child Prodigy" by the Berliner musikalische Zeitung in 1793. He studied under D.G. Türk while taking philosophy at Halle, and after completing his studies in 1807 he moved to Vienna. There he drew the attention of Ludwig van Beethoven, who was impressed by his performance of works by Johann Sebastian Bach. He served as a church organist from 1819 to 1827 before moving back to Dessau to teach piano. Rust's students included Dorothea von Ertmann and his nephew Wilhelm Rust. He also became friends with Felix Mendelssohn.
