= Carl Höckh =

German violinist and composer (1707–1773)

Carl Höckh (22 January 1707 – 25 November 1773) was a German violinist and composer.

== Biography ==
Carl Höckh was born in January 1707 to Christoph and Magdalena Höckh of Ebersdorf. He studied violin with his father and voice with Ferdinand Dorfmüller. He was then taught by Michael Schade before becoming a military oboist. As a member of the Franz Paul Graf Weilli regiment, he spent two years in Temesvár and Orsova before leaving to travel through Poland with Franz Benda, Georg Zarth and Wilhelm Weidner. All four became musicians for Sukascheffski Szaniawsky, governor of Warsaw; Höckh played violin and horn. In 1734, he became music director at Zerbst on the recommendation of Benda, teaching and performing violin. His students included Friedrich Wilhelm Rust, Johann Wilhelm Hertel, and Carl Friedrich Christian Fasch.

== Works ==
Höckh is considered "one of the founders of the German school of violin playing" – he wrote extensively and idiomatically for the instrument, incorporating more advanced techniques than most of his contemporaries. His works include eleven symphonies, seventeen violin concertos, seven partitas, twenty-seven violin sonatas, and thirty-four capricetti.
