= Gottfried Wilhelm Becker =

German physician and writer (1778–1854)

- Born: 22 February 1778; Leipzig
- Died: 17 January 1854; Leipzig
- Occupations: Medical doctor, author, translator, writer

Gottfried Wilhelm Becker (22 February 1778 – 17 January 1854) was a German medical doctor and writer.

== Biography ==
Becker was born and died in Leipzig. He translated some of Cooper's novels and My Prisons by Silvio Pellico. By his literary labors he accumulated $40,000. His son Karl Ferdinand, an organist and writer on musical topics, added a house worth $7,000 to this sum, and the whole was dedicated to the establishment of an educational and charitable institution for the blind in Leipzig.
