= Carl Ferdinand Becker =

German musician (1804–1877)

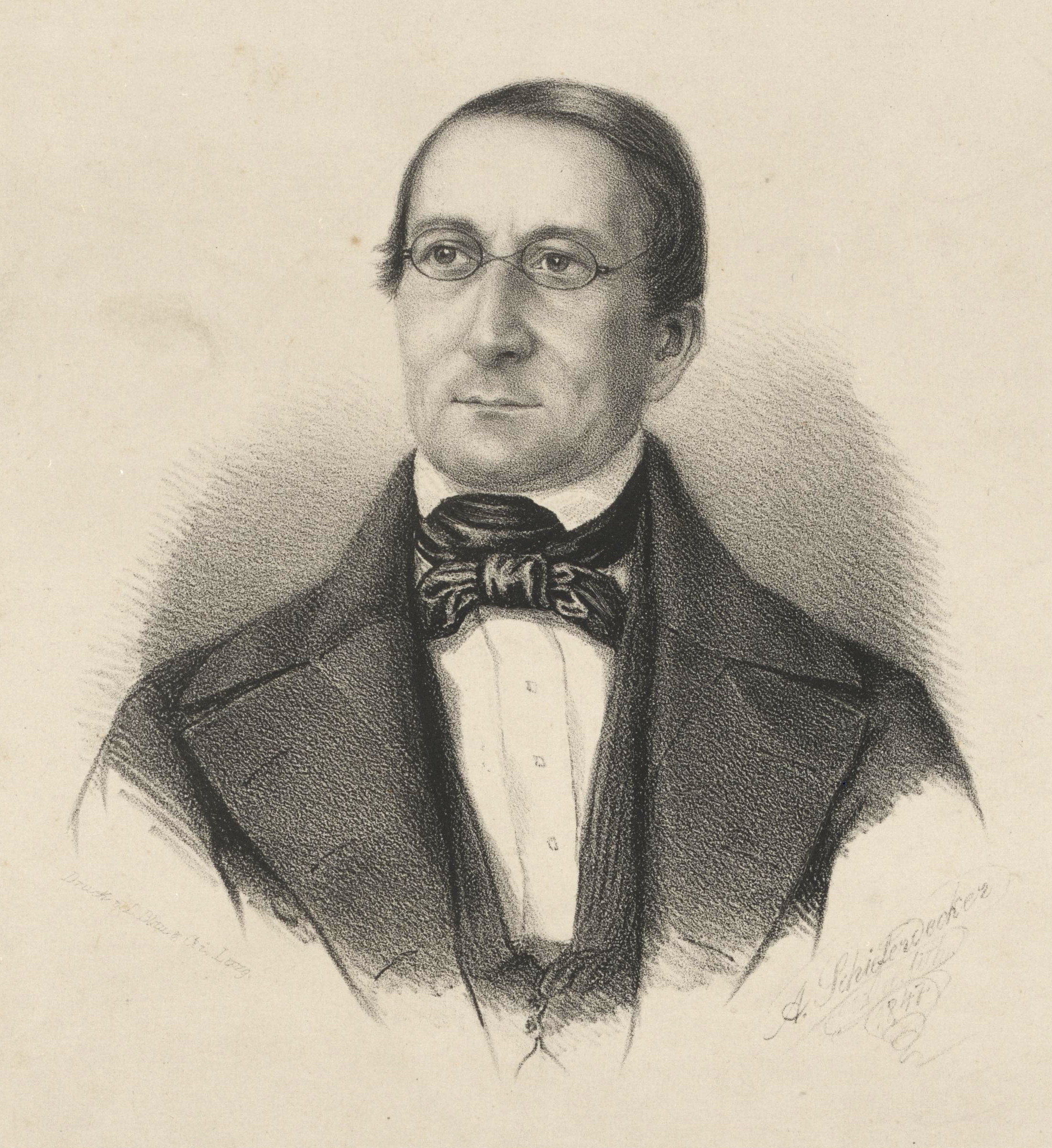
Karl Ferdinand Becker

Karl Ferdinand Becker (17 July 1804 Leipzig – 26 October 1877 Plagwitz section of Leipzig), was a German writer on music, composer and an organist.

== Biography ==
Becker was the son of physician and writer Gottfried Wilhelm Becker. He attended the Thomasschule in Leipzig in his early years, where his teachers Johann Gottfried Schicht and Friedrich Schneider trained him in music. He made his debut as a pianist at 14. From 1820 to 1833, he was a violinist in the Leipzig Gewandhaus Orchestra. In 1825, he became an organist in the Peterskirche and then in 1837 at the St. Nicholas Church. In 1846, he became an instructor of organ and music history at the University of Music and Theatre at Leipzig. He was one of the founders of the Leipzig Bach Gesellschaft in 1850.

== Works ==
His works on the history of music place him in the same rank with Raphael Georg Kiesewetter and Carl von Winterfeld. Among his works are:

- Rathgeber für Organisten (Advisor for organists; Leipzig, 1828)
- Systematisch-chrologische Darstellung der musikalischen Litteratur (Systematic chronological representation of musical literature; Leipzig, 1836)
- Die Hausmusik in Deutschland im 16. 17. und 18. Jahrhundert (Household music in Germany in the 16th, 17th and 18th centuries; Leipzig, 1840)
- Die Tonkünstler des 19. Jahrhunderts (Composers of the 19th century; 1847)
- Die Tonwerke des 16. und 17. Jahrhunderts (1847), an index of musical works published in the 16th and 17th centuries
- Lieder und Weisen vergangener Jahrhunderte (Songs and melodies of past centuries; 2d ed., Leipzig, 1852)

He was among the most active contributors to Robert Schumann's Neue Zeitschrift für Musik. Other journals he contributed to were Caecilia (edited by Gottfried Weber), Eufonia, Tageblatt, and Zeitgenossen.

== Scores ==
- IMSLP Organ music.
