= Jiří Čart =

Bohemian composer, violinist and flautist

Jiří Čart (German: Georg Czarth, Zarth, Czard, Szarth, Tzarth, or Zardt; 8 April 1708 – c. 1780) was a Bohemian composer, violinist and flautist of the late baroque period.

== Life ==
Georg Czarth was born in Vysoká. He received his first musical instruction from his father, Lukas Lorenz, cantor in Havlíčkův Brod and teacher of Johann Stamitz. After attending school in Vysoká, Czarth furthered his musical education in Prague and then, at the age of 17, in Vienna. In Vienna he received violin instruction from the Royal Court musicians Franz Josef Timmer and Johann Otto Rosetter (1690–1752); and from Biarelli he learned the flute. In Vienna he also met the violinist Franz Benda and in 1729 the two musicians left Vienna. After being joined in Breslau (today Wrocław) by the violinist Carl Höckh and the hornist Wilhelm Weidner they searched for better employment opportunities in Poland. In Warsaw, Czarth and the three other musicians were taken into the employment of the Starosta Jan Suchorzewski and formed part of a small orchestra of around nine musicians. After the departure of Benda in 1732, Czarth became the concertmaster of Suchorzewski's orchestra, but later that year followed Benda into the Royal Polish Chapel at the Saxon Court in Warsaw.

In 1734, following the death of August II and the dissolution of the Polish Chapel, Czarth and Benda entered into the service of the crown prince Friedrich of Prussia in Ruppin and a year later in Rheinsberg. Upon the ascent of Friedrich to the throne of Prussia in 1740, the two musicians were transferred to Berlin, where they were employed in the newly founded Court Orchestra.

In 1758 the careers of Czarth and Benda diverged when Czarth left Berlin for a position in the Mannheim Court Orchestra. During his time there he was mentioned in the travel diary of Leopold Mozart after a meeting between the two. Czarth remained in this position until 1778 when the Court orchestra was moved to Munich. Czarth stayed in Mannheim and died shortly after, although the exact date of his death is unknown. An official Mannheim Court document gives his death year as 1780.

== Works ==
Most of Czarth's works were composed during his time in Berlin and are highly representative of the Empfindsamer Stil. He composed many sinfonias (all presumed lost), concertos for flute, concertos for violin, a concerto for flute and bassoon, and numerous solo and trio sonatas for various instruments. In 1753 six flute sonatas (premier œuvre), and six violin sonatas (IIe œuvre) were published in Paris.
