= Ernst Naumann =

German musician (1832–1910)

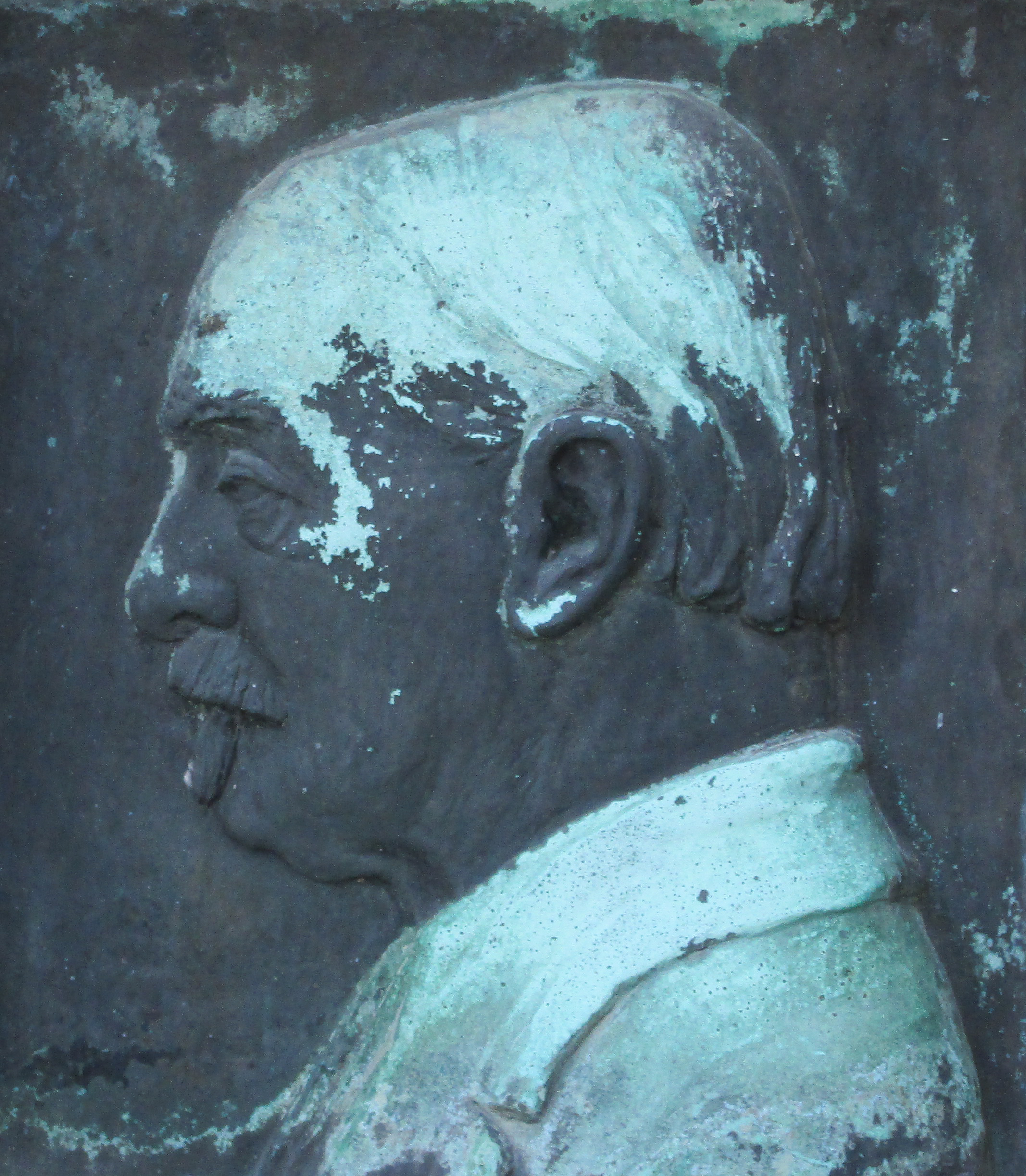
Portrait

Carl Ernst Naumann (15 August 1832 – 15 December 1910) was a German organist, composer, conductor, editor, arranger and musicologist. He is best known now as an arranger and editor of the music of J.S. Bach, Mozart and Mendelssohn. He was a friend of Schumann and Brahms, and conducted the first performance of the latter's Alto Rhapsody in 1870.

== Biography ==
Carl (or Karl) Ernst Naumann was born in Freiberg in Saxony in 1832, the son of mineralogist Carl Friedrich Naumann. He was a cousin of Emil Naumann (1827–1888) and grandson of Johann Gottlieb Naumann (1741–1801), both composers.

Ernst Naumann studied the organ with Johann Gottlob Schneider junior (1789–1864) and composition with Moritz Hauptmann and Ernst Richter. He published a treatise, Über die verschiedenen Bestimmungen der Tonverhältnisse und die Bedeutung des pythagoräischen oder reinen Quinten-Systems für unsere heutige Musik (The Various Definitions of Pitch Proportions and the Meaning of the Pythagorean Perfect Fifths System for Music Today) (Leipzig, 1858).

From 1860 until his death 50 years later he was organist and kapellmeister in Jena; from 1877 professor.

He made arrangements of the music of Bach, Beethoven, Mendelssohn, Mozart, Schumann, and published editions of Bach, Handel and Vivaldi. He prepared six volumes of Bach's cantatas and keyboard pieces for publication as well as a nine-volume edition of his organ works. He did not complete his edition of Haydn's string quartets.

Naumann was friendly with Brahms and Schumann. The similarity of Brahms’s music to that of late Beethoven was first noted in a letter from Albert Dietrich to Ernst Naumann on 5 November 1853. Naumann was one of the people Dietrich wrote to in March 1854, following Schumann's suicide attempt in late February.

On 3 March 1870, with the Akademischer Gesangverein of Jena, Naumann conducted the first public performance of Brahms's Alto Rhapsody, with Pauline Viardot as soloist.

He died in 1910 in Jena, aged 78.

== Compositions ==
Naumann wrote in no large forms such as symphonies or operas, but confined himself to chamber music and vocal music. His original compositions include:

- Sonata in G minor for viola and piano, Op. 1 (1854)
- 4 Stücke (4 Pieces) for violin and piano, Op. 2 (c.1859)
- 5 Lieder von Joseph von Eichendorff for voice and piano, Op. 3 (c.1860); words by Joseph von Eichendorff

1. Morgen: „Fliegt der erste Morgenstrahl“
2. Nachtwanderer: „Ich wand're durch die stille Nacht“
3. Erinnerung: „Die fernen Heimathöhen“
4. Wehmut: „Ich irr' in Tal und Hainen“
5. „Grün war die Weide, der Himmel blau“

- Three Fantasiestücke (3 Fantasy Pieces) for cello (or viola) and piano, Op. 4 (1861)
- Three Fantasiestücke (3 Fantasy Pieces) for viola (or violin) and piano, Op. 5 (1861)
- String Quintet No. 1 in C major for 2 violins, 2 violas and cello, Op. 6 (1862)
- Trio in F minor for violin, viola and piano, Op. 7 (1863)
- 5 Impromptus for piano 4-hands, Op. 8 (1865)
- String Quartet in B-flat major [G minor?], Op. 9
- Serenade in A major, Nonet for flute, oboe, bassoon, horn, 2 violins, viola, cello and double bass, Op. 10 (1872)
- Romanze from the Nonet for violin and piano, Op. 10 (published 1874)
- Four Lieder for four-part male chorus a cappella, Op. 11 (1873)

1. Im Frühling: „Lerchen singen in der Luft“
2. An den Vollmond: „Vollmond, schaust so klar hernieder“
3. Die Perle des Jahres: „Blau ist der Himmel, klar ist die Luft“
4. Freundschaft und Gesang: „Was in der Töne Weihestunden“

- String Trio in D major, Op. 12 (published 1883; violin, viola and cello)
- String Quintet No. 2 in E♭ major for 2 violins, 2 violas and cello, Op. 13 (published 1880)
- Salvum fac regem for male chorus a cappella, Op. 14
- 3 Lieder for voice and piano, Op. 15 (1879); words by Julius Altmann

1. Abendwolke: „Gold'ne Wolk in stiller Höh'“
2. Trauer: „Ich kann kein Lied jetzt singen“
3. Strandlied: „Fahr' ich hin mit leichtem Kahn“

- Pastorale for chamber orchestra, Op. 16 (flute, 2 oboes, 2 clarinets in B-flat, 2 bassoons, 2 horns in F, 2 violins, viola, cello, bass)
- Ehre sei Gott in der Höhe for mixed chorus a cappella
- String Quartet in D minor

== Recordings ==
Ernst Naumann's music has been recorded on CD:

- Three Fantasiestücke for Viola and Piano, Op. 5; Ilya Hoffman (viola), Sergey Koudriakov (piano)
- String Trio in D major, Op. 12; Dresdner Streichtrio
