= Carl von Winterfeld =

German musicologist

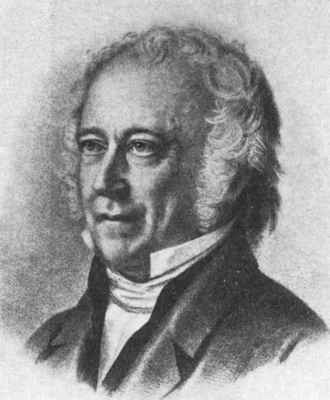
Carl von Winterfeld

Carl Georg Vivigens von Winterfeld (28 January 1784 – 19 February 1852) was a German lawyer and musicologist. He studied music from the 16th to 18th centuries, and was instrumental in reviving it, especially the music by Heinrich Schütz.

== Life ==
Winterfeld was born in Berlin. His parents were Karl Friedrich Gotthilf von Winterfeldt (17 May 1757 - 14 September 1824) and his wife Sophie Elisabeth Helene Wilhelmine von Köhler (28 March 1754 – 13 April 1821).

Winterfeld studied law at the University of Halle from 1803, and was appointed as a judge in Breslau in 1816. After his return to Berlin in 1832, he was appointed Obertribunalrat, and in 1839 became an honorary member of the Prussian Academy of Arts. Winterfeld was a founding member of the Bach-Gesellschaft and since 1835 a member of the Gesetzlose Gesellschaft zu Berlin.

Winterfeld is credited with the rediscovery of Heinrich Schütz, publishing works by Schütz in his work about Gabrieli in 1834. In 1812, he undertook a journey to Italy, where he made copies of compositions from the 16th to 18th centuries. He found more music from the period in Breslau. His collection is kept in the Berlin State Library. Winterfeld was a patron of August Heinrich Hoffmann von Fallersleben, who dedicated the song collection "Siebengestirn gevatterlicher Wiegen-Lieder für Frau Minna von Winterfeld" to him in gratitude, or to his wife Wilhelmine "Minna" von Winterfeld and their children.

== Family ==
Winterfeld married Wilhelmine von Thümen (20 June 1789 – 1 November 1845). The couple had several children, including

- Sigismund, Hoffmann von Fallersleben's godfather
- Rudolf (22 March 1829 – 23 July 1894), married to Pauline von Roeder (5 January 1845 – 15 August 1914)

== Publications ==
- Giovanni Pierluigi da Palestrina. Breslau 1832.
- Giovanni Gabrieli und sein Zeitalter. Berlin 1834 (Part 1 is available for free viewing and download at the Internet Archive; Part 2 is available for free viewing and download at the Internet Archive; Teil 3 (Notenanhang) is available for free viewing and download at the Internet Archive).
- Dr. Martin Luther's deutsche geistliche Lieder. Leipzig 1840.
- Der evangelische Kirchengesang und sein Verhältniss zur Kunst des Tonsatzes Leipzig 1843–47.
  - Part 1: Der Evangelische Kirchengesang im ersten Jahrhunderte der Kirchenverbesserung. Breitkopf und Härtel, Leipzig 1843 (Numerized at Google Books).
  - Part 2: Der Evangelische Kirchengesang im siebzehnten Jahrhunderte. Breitkopf und Härtel, Leipzig 1845 (Numerized at Google Books).
  - Part 3: Der Evangelische Kirchengesang im achtzehnten Jahrhunderte. Breitkopf und Härtel, Leipzig 1847 (Numerized).
- Zur Geschichte heiliger Tonkunst. Leipzig 1850–52.
