= Bach Gesellschaft =

Defunct group that published Bach's works

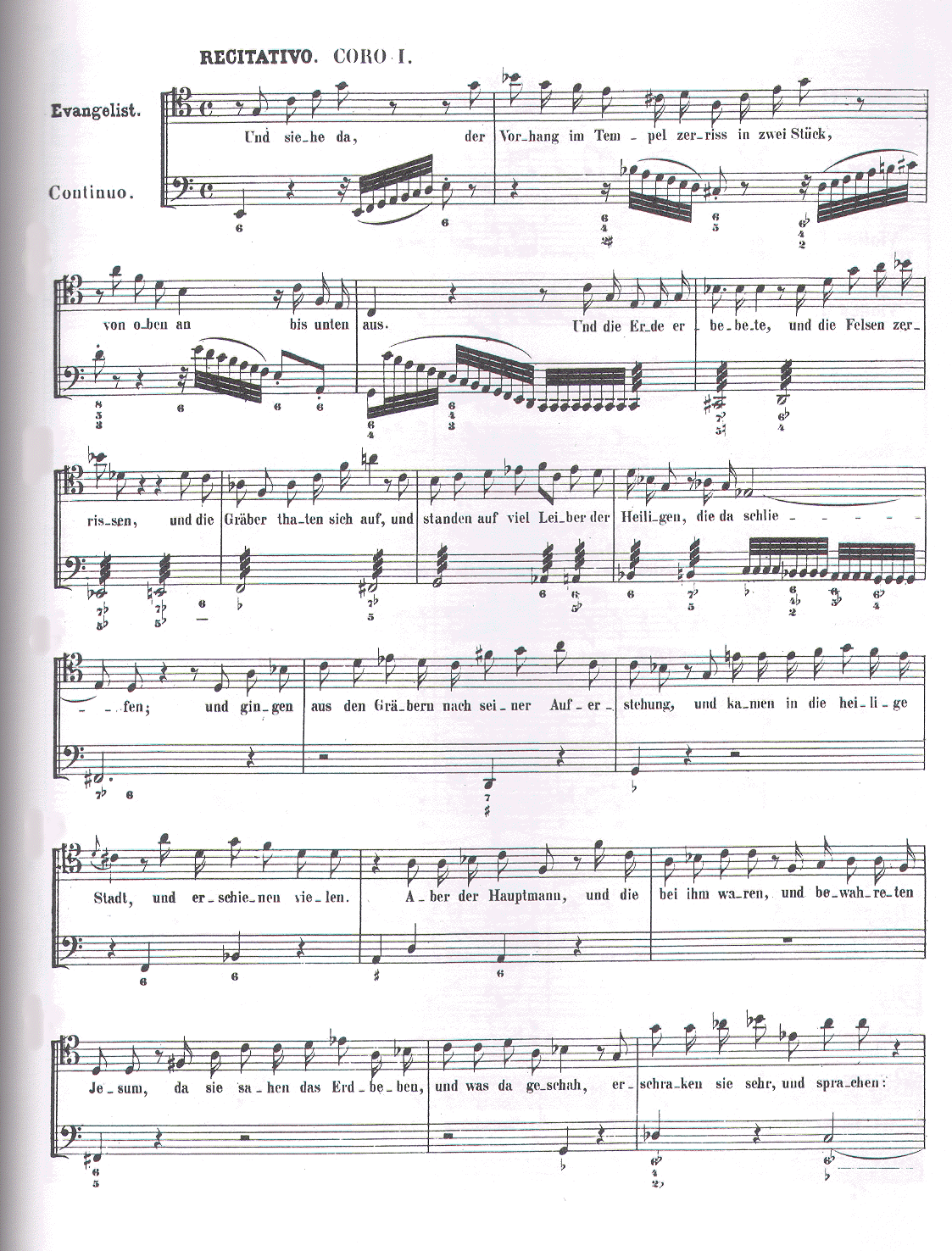
A page from the Bach-Gesellschaft edition of J. S. Bach's St Matthew Passion, BWV 244, as published in 1856

The German Bach-Gesellschaft (Bach Society) was a society formed in Leipzig in 1850 for the express purpose of publishing the complete works of Johann Sebastian Bach without editorial additions. The collected works are known as the Bach-Gesellschaft-Ausgabe. On completion of the project, the Society dissolved itself.

The nineteenth-century society should be distinguished from its successor, the Neue Bachgesellschaft (New Bach Society), founded in 1900.

== Origins of the Bach-Gesellschaft ==
The founders of the society were Moritz Hauptmann, cantor of the St. Thomas Church, Leipzig, (and thus a successor of Bach); Otto Jahn, author of a famous biography of Mozart; Carl Ferdinand Becker, teacher at the Leipzig Conservatory; and the composer Robert Schumann.

== Publication history ==
The Bach-Gesellschaft began publishing Bach's works in 1851 with a volume that started with BWV 1, the cantata Wie schön leuchtet der Morgenstern, BWV 1. It completed publication in 1900 with its forty-sixth volume. However, the edition of The Art of Fugue by Wolfgang Graeser, published in 1926, is sometimes counted as "Volume 47" and was issued as a supplement to the Bach-Gesellschaft publication by Breitkopf & Härtel, publishers of the original series. Additionally, Vol. 45, part 1 includes a revised edition ("Neue berichtigte Ausgabe") of the English Suites and French Suites that had previously been published in Vol. 13.

Among the editors was Alfred Dörffel. Johannes Brahms was one of the subscribers to the project and also served on the editorial board. A list of subscribers was printed in each volume.

== Quality of the edition ==
The volumes varied somewhat in editorial quality and accuracy; Bach scholar Hans T. David particularly criticized Vol. 31's presentation of The Musical Offering for numerous incorrect readings, and the 1911 Encyclopædia Britannica calls the edition as a whole "of very unequal merit." Britannica both lauds the editing of Wilhelm Rust for the edition and notes a deterioration of standards after his death, including a volume in which "the bass and violin are a bar apart for a whole line" (apparently a reference to sloppy editing). In his edition of the Goldberg Variations, Ralph Kirkpatrick also calls attention to several "mistakes of the Bachgesellschaft edition" that he has corrected, particularly with regard to the presentation of ornaments. (The Bach-Gesellschaft volume containing the Goldbergs was one of the first to be published—Vol. 3, which appeared in 1853.)

Nevertheless, the Bach-Gesellschaft's volumes were a groundbreaking achievement and contributed greatly to the study and appreciation of Bach's music. They remained the standard edition of Bach's complete works until the publication of the Neue Bach-Ausgabe by Bärenreiter and the Deutscher Verlag für Musik (1954–2007).
