= Moritz Hauptmann =

German music theorist, teacher and composer (1792–1868)

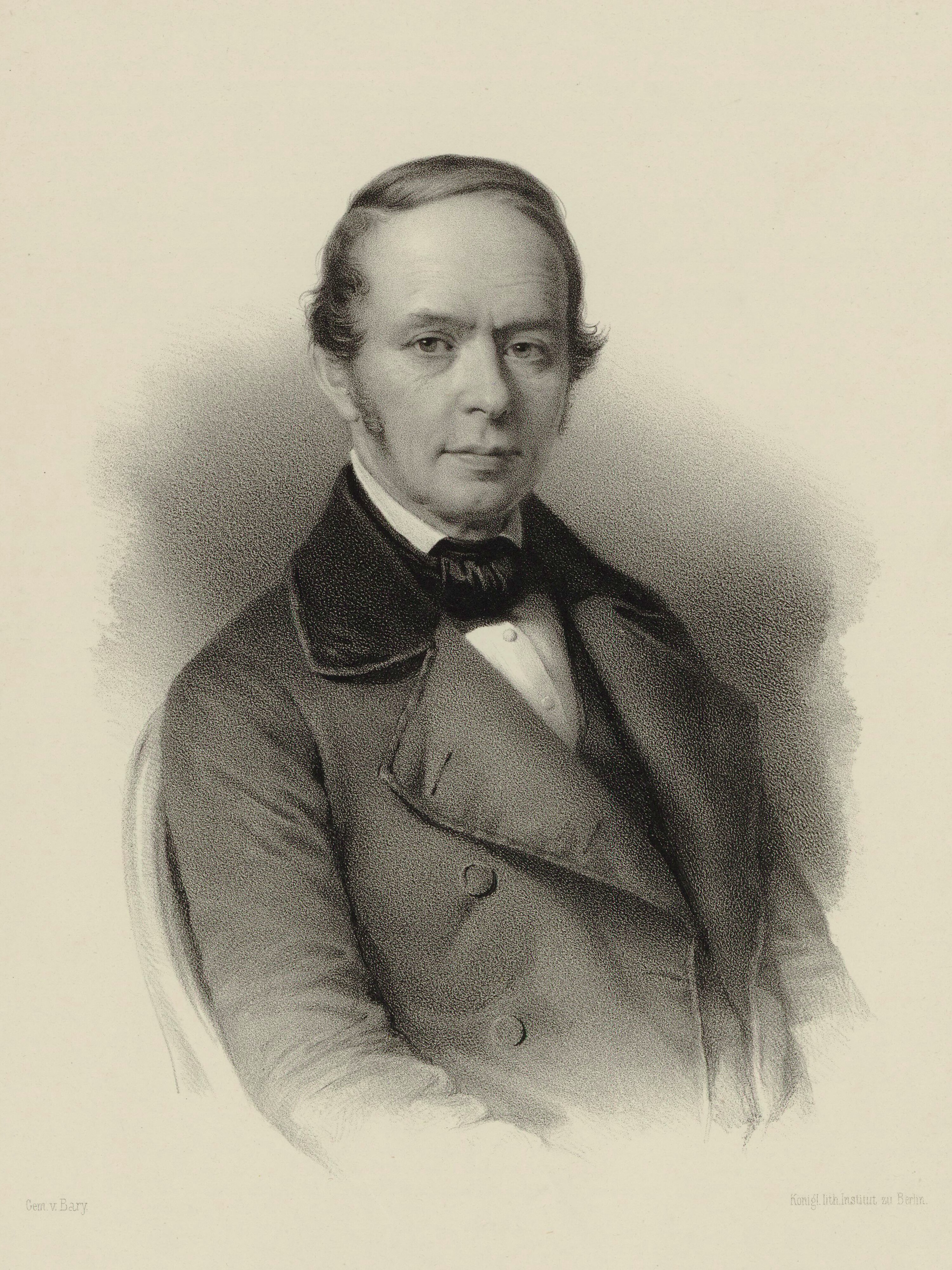
Engraving of Hauptmann, 1840

Moritz Hauptmann (13 October 1792, Dresden – 3 January 1868, Leipzig), was a German music theorist, teacher and composer. His principal theoretical work is the 1853 Die Natur der Harmonie und der Metrik explores numerous topics, particular the philosophy of music.

== Biography ==
Hauptmann was born in Dresden, and studied violin under Scholz, piano under Franz Lauska, composition under Grosse and Francesco Morlacchi (who was a rival in Dresden of Carl Maria von Weber). He completed his education as a violinist and composer under Louis Spohr, and until 1821 held various appointments in private families. In addition, he studied mathematics and acoustics.

Hauptmann was initially employed as an architect before finding success as a musician. Notable in his early musical output is a grand tragic opera, Mathilde. He joined the orchestra of Kassel in 1822 under Spohr's direction. There, he first taught composition and music theory. His pupils included Ferdinand David, Friedrich Burgmüller, Gustav Graben-Hoffmann, Charles Edward Horsley, Friedrich Kiel, Ernst Naumann, Oscar Paul, Isidor Seiss and others.

In 1842, Hauptmann became Thomaskantor in Leipzig (a post once held by Johann Sebastian Bach) as well as professor of music theory at the newly founded conservatoire at the invitation of Felix Mendelssohn. In this capacity, his unique gift as a teacher developed and it was readily acknowledged by his enthusiastic and quite-often distinguished pupils.

== Compositions ==
Hauptmann's compositions are marked by symmetry and craftsmanship rather than spontaneous invention. His vocal output includes two masses, choral songs for mixed voices (Op. 32, 47) and numerous part songs.

== Literary work ==
He was a founding member and editor of the Bach Gesellschaft edition of the complete works of Bach, where he edited the first two volumes of church cantatas and the Lutheran Masses.

His musical philosophy is embodied in his book Die Natur der Harmonie und der Metrik (The Nature of Harmony and Meter, 1853), in which he attempted a philosophic explanation of musical form. His theory is described as "Hegelian" and he emphasized concepts of unity, opposition, and reunion, which he finds in chords, scales, key relationships, and meter. He conceived of minor and major triads as opposite. This theory influenced "harmonic dualists" including Hugo Riemann. He also advocated just intonation and considered enharmonic progressions unnatural. In this sense, he could be considered a conservative in relation to the compositional trends of his time. He displayed a taste for classical proportion, formal order, metrical clarity, and tonal logic. Unlike the Romantic trends of continuous legato, he considered any "metrical first" (i.e. downbeat – implied or actual) to be automatically accented.
