= Alfred Dörffel =

German pianist, music publisher and librarian

- Born: 24 January 1821; Waldenburg, Saxony, Germany
- Died: 22 January 1905 (aged 83); Leipzig, Germany
- Occupations: Music publisher; Librarian
- Organizations: Bach Gesellschaft; Breitkopf & Härtel; Edition Peters

Alfred Dörffel (24 January 1821 – 22 January 1905) was a German pianist, music publisher and librarian.

== Career ==
Dörffel was born in Waldenburg, Saxony, the son of August Friedrich Dörffel and his wife Christiane Charlotte, née Kröhne. He received his first musical training by the Waldenburg organist Johann Adolf Trube. He later studied in Leipzig with Gottfried Wilhelm Fink, Felix Mendelssohn and Robert Schumann.

Dörffel was editor for Breitkopf & Härtel and Edition Peters. He published a Führer durch die musikalische Welt (Guide to the musical world), translated the Instrumentationslehre (Instruction on scoring) by Hector Berlioz, published in 1864. He edited several volumes of the first complete edition of the Works of Johann Sebastian Bach by the Bach-Gesellschaft, known as the Bach-Gesellschaft-Ausgabe, beginning with cantatas in 1876 and ending with the St Luke Passion (then attributed to Bach) in 1898. He wrote reviews for the Neue Zeitschrift für Musik and the Musikalisches Wochenblatt (Musical weekly). In 1881, Dörffler wrote the review of 100 years Gewandhaus for the centenary of the concert hall, Festschrift zur hundertjährigen Jubelfeier der Einweihung des Concertsaales im Gewandhause zu Leipzig, including a statistic of the concerts during this period.

Dörffler founded a library for literature on music, which became part of the Musikbibliothek Peters, opened in 1894. He also worked as curator for the music section of the Stadtbibliothek Leipzig (Leipzig municipal library).

The Universität Leipzig awarded him an honorary doctorate in 1885. Gustav Flügel dedicated his Drei Klavierstücke, Op. 38 (1856, Leipzig, Merseburger) to Dörffel.

Dörffler was a member of the Masonic Lodge Balduin zur Linde from 1842 and composed several works for their meetings, often on texts by Gotthard Oswald Marbach. He was married to Charlotte Louise Benigna, née Trabert, they had several children. He died in Leipzig.
