= Wilhelm Rust =

German musicologist and composer (1822–1892)

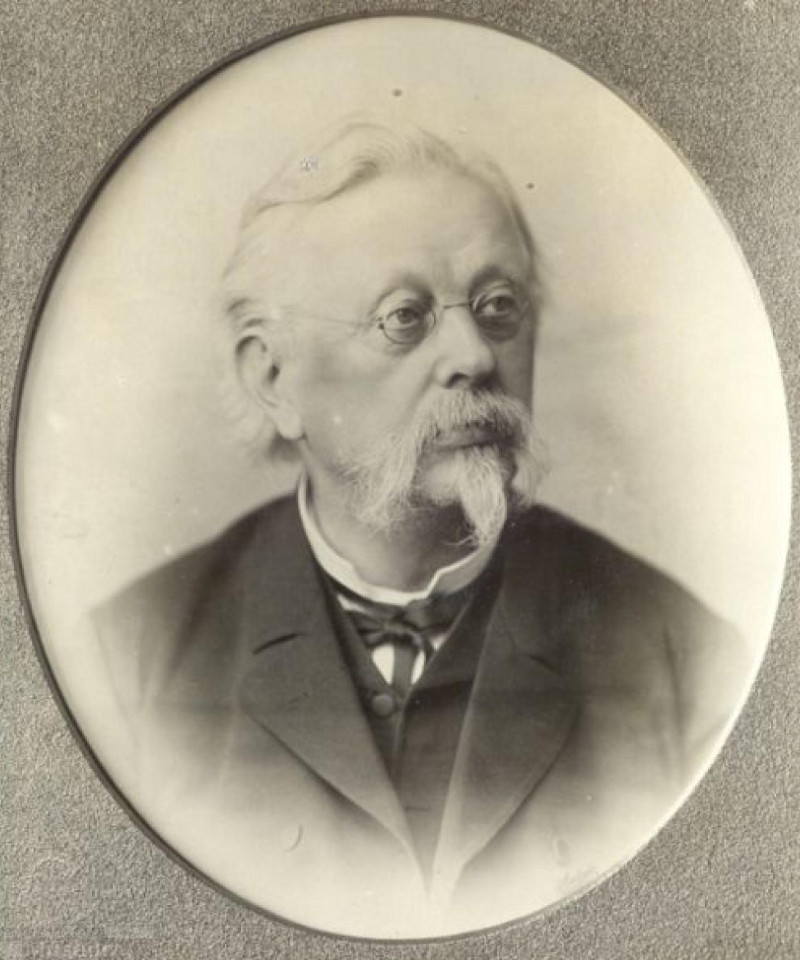
Wilhelm Rust in 1885

Wilhelm Rust (15 August 1822 – 2 May 1892) was a German musicologist and composer. He is most noted today for his substantial contributions to the Bach Gesellschaft edition of the works of Johann Sebastian Bach.

Born in Dessau, Rust studied piano and organ with his uncle Wilhelm Karl Rust, and later under Friedrich Schneider (1843–1846). From 1845 to 1848 he was music teacher in a Hungarian nobleman's family. He went to Berlin in 1849, where he taught and joined the Singakademie in 1850. He joined the Leipzig Bach-Verein in 1850, and played in numerous concerts. He became organist of St. Luke's in 1861, conductor of the Berlin Bach-Verein from 1862 to 1874, and Royal Music Director in 1864. He received an honorary D.Phil. from the University of Marburg in 1868. In 1870, he became teacher of theory and composition at the Stern Conservatory. In 1878 he moved to Leipzig, where he became a teacher at the Leipzig Conservatory and organist at the Thomaskirche. In 1880 he succeeded Ernst Richter as Cantor of the Thomasschule zu Leipzig and director of the Thomanerchor.

== See also ==
- Wo Gott der Herr nicht bei uns hält, BWV 1128
