= Johann Ludwig Bach =

German composer

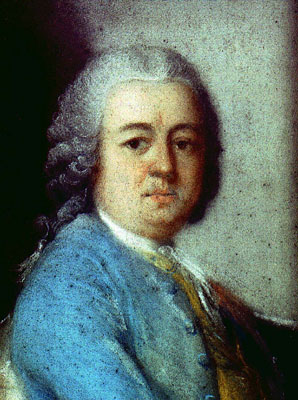
Johann Ludwig Bach.

Johann Ludwig Bach (14 February [O.S. 4 February] 1677 – 1 May 1731) was a German composer and violinist.

He was born in Thal (Ruhla) near Eisenach on 4 February 1677. At the age of 22 he moved to Meiningen eventually being appointed cantor there, and later Kapellmeister. He wrote a large amount of music and regularly oversaw performances, both at Meiningen and neighbouring courts.

He was a third cousin of Johann Sebastian Bach, who made copies of several of his cantatas and performed them at Leipzig. The cantata Denn du wirst meine Seele nicht in der Hölle lassen, BWV 15, once thought to be by Johann Sebastian, and listed as BWV 15 in Wolfgang Schmieder's catalogue of his works, is now thought to be by Johann Ludwig.

Bach died on 1 May 1731 in Meiningen.

== Works, editions and recordings ==
The earliest lists of compositions by Johann Ludwig Bach appeared in the 19th century: Johann Theodor Mosewius listed 16 of his cantatas in 1852, and Alfred Dörffel listed 17 cantatas and the Mass in E minor, with their incipits, in Vol. 41 of the Bach-Gesellschaft Ausgabe (1894). The Johann-Ludwig-Bach-Verzeichnis (catalogue of compositions by Johann Ludwig Bach, abbreviated JLB) contains 39 compositions, starting, in the same sequence, with the 17 cantatas listed by Dörffel:

1. Gott ist unser Zuversicht, sacred cantata for the fourth Sunday after Epiphany. Scored for soprano, alto, tenor and bass soloists (satb) and choir (SATB), with an accompaniment consisting of 2 violin parts and one viola part (Str), and basso continuo (Bc). Performed in Leipzig on 3 February 1726.
2. Der Gottlosen Arbeit, sacred cantata for the fifth Sunday after Epiphany. Scored for satbSATB, Str and Bc. Performed in Leipzig on 10 February 1726.
3. Darum will ich auch erwählen, sacred cantata for the third Sunday before Lent (Septuagesima). Scored for satbSATB, two oboes (2Ob), Str and Bc. Performed in Leipzig on 17 February 1726.
4. Darum säet euch Gerechtigkeit, sacred cantata for the second Sunday before Lent (Sexagesima). Scored for satbSATB, Str and Bc. Performed in Leipzig on 24 February 1726.
5. Ja, mir hast du Arbeit gemacht, sacred cantata for the last Sunday before Lent (Estomihi). Scored for satbSATB, Str and Bc. Performed in Leipzig on 3 March 1726. Movements:
  Part I
  Aria (bass): "Ja, mir hast du Arbeit gemacht" (Yes, you rather burden me, Isaiah 43:24–25) – Recitative (tenor): "Der Herr der Herrlichkeit" (The Lord of blessedness) – Duet (alto, tenor): "Ach, der Sünden Greul und Wust" (O, confusing sinfulness) – Recitative (bass): "Sehet, wir gehen hinauf" (Come now, we journey the path)
  Part II
  Aria (soprano): "Fließt, ihr Lieb- und Trauertränen" (Flow, my tears of love and mourning!, Luke 18:31–33) – Recitative (soprano): "Dies ist das Reis'geschenk" (With tears I follow you) – Arioso (alto): "O wundergroße Lieb" (O wondrous loving heart) – Chorus: "Zieh, teurer Jesus, hin" (My precious Lord, alas), concluding with two stanzas from Johannes Heermann's "Herzliebster Jesu, was hast du verbrochen" (tune by Johannes Crüger)
6. Wie lieblich sind auf den Bergen, sacred cantata for the first Sunday after Easter (Quasimodogeniti). Scored for satbSATB, Str and Bc. Performed in Leipzig on 28 April 1726.
7. Ich will meinen Geist, sacred cantata for the sixth Sunday after Trinity. Scored for satbSATB, two natural horns (2Hn), Str and Bc. Performed in Leipzig on 28 July 1726. Movements:
  1. Duet (soprano, alto): "Ich will meinen Geist in euch geben"
  2. Recitative (bass): "Das Gute, das ich kann"
  3. Aria (bass): "Lass mich deine Hilfe spüren"
  4. Arioso (alto, tenor): "An dem merken wir, dass wir ihn kennen"
  5. Aria (soprano): "Seele, wilst du Christum kennen"
  6. Recitative (soprano): "Dies ist die Prob', die er von dir begehrt"
  7. Chorus: "Hilf Jesu, hilf" – Chorale: "Die Werke kommen wahrlich her"
8. Die mit Tränen säen, sacred cantata for the third Sunday after Easter (Jubilate). Scored for satbSATB, Str and Bc. Performed in Leipzig on 12 May 1726. Movements:
  1. Chorus: "Die mit Tränen säen" (Who has sorrow planting, Psalms 126:5–6)
  2. Recitative (alto): "Bei unverdrossnem Schweiß" (Alone by work and care)
  3. Aria (alto): "Tau und Tränen feuchten Saat und Herzen an" (Dew and weeping water seeds and faithful hearts)
  4. Duet (tenor, bass): "Denn ich halte es dafür" (This I strongly do maintain, Romans 8:18)
  5. Aria (soprano): "Dringt, ihr Qualen auf mich her" (Come, o torments, over me)
  6. Recitative (soprano): "Es kann die Seel kein besser Glück genießen" (The soul can know no higher satisfaction)
  7. Chorus: "O angenehmer Tausch" (O wonderful exchange), concluding with three stanzas from "Kommt her zu mir" by Georg Grünwald
9. Mache dich auf, werde licht, sacred cantata for the feast of Purification. Scored for satbSATB, 2Ob, Str and Bc. Performed in Leipzig on 2 February 1726. Movements:
  Part I
  Aria (bass): "Mache dich auf, werde licht" (Rise up and shine, be a light) – Duet (soprano, tenor): "Und die Heiden" (And the nations) – Recitative (alto): "Siehst du, verdüstert Aug'" (See now, most darkened eye) – Aria (soprano): "Weicht, ihr Schatten" (Flee, dark shadows) – Aria (tenor): "Herr, nun lässet du deinen Diener" (Lord, you let now your faithful servant)
  Part II
  Aria (alto): "Herr, dein Wort, das ist geschehen" (Lord, your word has been fulfilled now) – Recitative (soprano, alto, tenor, bass): "Dein Reich ist ja den Menschen zubereitet" (Your kingdom, Lord, is meant for ev'rybody) – Chorus: "Laß, Höchster, diesen Wunsch" (Most highest, may this wish)
10. Er ist aus der Angst und Gericht genommen, sacred cantata for Easter Monday. Scored for satbSATB, 2Ob, Str and Bc. Performed in Leipzig on 22 April 1726.
11. Er machet uns lebendig, sacred cantata for Easter Tuesday. Scored for satbSATB, Str and Bc. Performed in Leipzig on 23 April 1726. Movements:
  1. Chorus: "Er machet uns lebendig"
  2. Recitative: "Du hast gesiegt"
  3. Aria: "Soll ich vor dir, Herr"
  4. Duet: "So sind wir nun mit ihm begraben"
  5. Aria: "Geerbte Schuld"
  6. Recitative: "Nimm, Heiland, hin den Dank"
  7. Chorale: "Hilf, daß ich mit diesem Morgen"
12. Und ich will ihnen einen einigen Hirten, sacred cantata for the second Sunday after Easter (Misericordias Domini). Scored for satbSATB, Str and Bc. Performed in Leipzig on 5 May 1726.
13. Der Herr wird ein Neues im Lande, sacred cantata for the feast of Visitation. Scored for satbSATB, 2Ob, Str and Bc. Performed in Leipzig on 2 July 1726. Movements:
  1. Chorus: "Der Herr wird ein Neues im Lande erschaffen"
  2. Recitative (alto): "Hat Gott nicht alles gut gemacht?"
  3. Aria (alto): "Evens Kinder aus der Schuld zu reißen"
  4. Aria (soprano): "Meine Seele erhebt den Herrn"
  5. Arioso (tenor, bass): "Gesegnet ist der Leib, der Jesum hat getragen"
  6. Recitative (alto, tenor, bass): "Muss alle Welt die Mutter selig preisen"
  7. Chorus: "Verschmähe nicht den Preis" – Chorale: "Nun lob', mein Seel', den Herren"
14. Die Weisheit kömmt nicht, sacred cantata for the fourth Sunday after Easter (Cantate). Scored for sabbSATB, 2Ob, Str and Bc. Performed in Leipzig on 19 May 1726. Movements:
  1. Chorus: "Die Weisheit kömmt nicht in eine boshafte Seele"
  2. Recitative (tenor): "Wie stehen Tag und Finsternis zusammen"
  3. Aria (tenor): "Licht und Recht muss die Brust der Seelen weisen"
  4. Arioso (bass): "Wenn derselbige kommt, der die Welt wird strafen"
  5. Aria (soprano): "Streu ein Fünklein reiner Flammen"
  6. Recitative (soprano): "Wie kann ich sonst vor seinem Recht bestehn?"
  7. Chorale (chorus): "O du allersüß'ste Freude"
15. Durch sein Erkenntnis, sacred cantata for the 11th Sunday after Trinity. Scored for satbSATB, 2Ob, Str and Bc. Performed in Leipzig on 1 September 1726.
16. Ich aber ging für dir über, sacred cantata for the 13th Sunday after Trinity. Scored for satbSATB, 2Ob, Str and Bc. Performed in Leipzig on 15 September 1726.
17. Siehe, ich will meinen Engel senden, sacred cantata for the feast of St. John the Baptist. Scored for satbSATB, 2Ob, Str and Bc. Performed in Leipzig on 24 June 1726.
18. Klingt vergnügt, ihr holden Saiten, secular cantata.
19. O Herr, ich bin dein Knecht, funeral music (Trauermusik) for Ernst Ludwig I, Duke of Saxe-Meiningen (died 24 November 1724). Movements:
  Part I:
  "O Herr, ich bin dein Knecht" (Chorus) – Recitative: "Du Gottes Ebenbild" (Soprano) – Aria: "Ach ja, die Ketten" (Soprano) – Recitative: "Dein Will kann nicht das?" (Alto) – Aria: "O Herr, ich bin dein Knecht" (Alto) – Recitative: "So kannstu aus dem Diensthaus" (Tenor) – Aria: "Ob gleich aller Treiber Wut" (Tenor) – Recitative: "Ja, der, dem alle Macht" (Bass) – "Meine Bande sind zurissen" (Chorus)
  Part II:
  Duet and Aria: Ich suche nur das Himmelleben (Soprano, Alto, Bass) – Chorale: Herr Jesu Christ (Chorus) – Duet: Drum will ich auch Dankopfer bringen (Alto, Tenor) – Aria: Das, was ich meinem Gott versprochen (Bass) – Chorale: Herr Jesu Christ (Chorus) – Duet: Drum Welt, ade, ich bin dein müde (Soprano, Alto) – Aria and Chorale: Jerusalem, ich tu verlangen (Tenor, Bass, Chorus)
  Part III:
  Dir Will Ich Dank Opfern (Chorus) – Recitative: Was Ist Der Mensch, Herr (Alto) – Aria: Dies Macht Dein Sohn (Alto) – Recitative: Befreit Mich Nun Der Sohn (Tenor) – Aria: Lob Und Dank Zum Opfer Geben (Tenor) – Recitative: Doch Eines Weiss Ich Noch (Soprano) – Aria: Da, Da Will Ich Dir Bezahlen (Soprano) – Accompagnato: Die Herrschaft, Welche Nur (Bass) – So Viel Gnadengaben (Bass) – Finale: In Dir, Jerusalem (Chorus) – Chorale: Preis, Lob, Ehr, Ruhm, Dank, Kraft Und Macht (Chorus)
20. Ouvertüre à 4 in G major.
21. Denn du wirst meine Seele nicht in der Hölle lassen, sacred cantata for Easter, in two parts. Performed in Leipzig on 21 April 1726, and for some time misattributed to Johann Sebastian Bach (BWV 15).
22. Küsset den Sohn, daß er nicht zürne.
23. Siehe, ich will viel Fischer aussenden.
24. Du sollst lieben Gott deinen Herrn, sacred cantata for the 13th Sunday after Trinity.
25. Es wird des Herren Tag kommen, sacred cantata.
26. Gehet, ihr Sorgen, gehet hin, for H. Anton Ulrich, 17 October 1728.
27. Gott sei uns gnädig, motet.
28. Das ist meine Freude, motet.
29. Uns ist ein Kind geboren, motet.
30. Die richtig für sich gewandelt haben, motet.
31. Ich will auf den Herren schauen, motet.
32. Wir wissen so unser irdisches Haus, motet.
33. Unsere Trübsal die zeitlich und leicht ist, motet.
34. Das Blut Jesu Christi, motet.
35. Sei nun wieder zufrieden, motet.
36. Gedenke meiner, mein Gott, funeral motet.
37. Ich habe dich ein klein Augenblick verlassen, motet.
38. Kyrie–Gloria Mass in E minor, Missa super cantilena "Allein Gott in der Höh sei Ehr", a.k.a. BWV Anh. 166, formerly attributed to Johann Nicolaus Bach. Short addition by J. S. Bach in his Leipzig copy of this composition. The text of the Gloria is partly in German: it intersperses the Latin text of the Gloria with, as cantus firmus, all four stanzas of "Allein Gott in der Höh sei Ehr" (which is itself a paraphrase of the Gloria), a Lutheran hymn by Nicolaus Decius and Joachim Slüter. Movements:
  Kyrie:
  "Kyrie eleison" – "Christe eleison" – "Kyrie eleison"
  Gloria:
  "Gloria in excelsis" – "Laudamus te" – "Domine Fili unigenite" – "Quoniam tu solus sanctus" – "Cum Sancto Spiritu"
39. Concerto for two violins and orchestra in D major.

Further there is a sacred cantata for the second Sunday after Trinity, Kommet, es ist alles bereit, JLB deest, with a manuscript dated 1719.

Compositions that are sometimes attributed to Johann Ludwig Bach:

- BWV Anh. 25 – Kyrie–Gloria Mass in C major, copied & performed by J. S. Bach c.1740–1742.
- BWV Anh. 167 – Kyrie–Gloria Mass for double choir in G major, according to 21st-century scholarship attributable to Christoph Bernhard, Johann Philipp Krieger or David Pohle. Older scholarship attributed the mass to Antonio Lotti or Johann Ludwig Bach, after it had been considered Johann Sebastian Bach's up to the middle of the 19th century.

=== Score publications ===
In 1852 Denn du wirst meine Seele nicht in der Hölle lassen, JLB 21, was published as J. S. Bach's 15th cantata by the Bach-Gesellschaft. Carus Verlag published the Kyrie-Gloria Mass (JLB 38), the Suite in G major (JLB 20), the motets, and a few cantatas (JLB 5, 8 and 9). Facsimiles of several 18th-century manuscripts containing Johann Ludwig Bach's works are available at the Bach Digital website. Ulrich Leisinger's edition of the Trauermusik, JLB 19, was published by Hofmeister.

=== Recordings ===
Sacred cantatas JLB 1–17:

- JLB 5, 8, 9 and 11: Barbara Schlick, Mary Nichols, Wilfried Jochens, Jugendkantorei Dormagen and Das Kleine Konzert conducted by Hermann Max (1981)
- JLB 7, 13 and 14: Maria Zadori, Kai Wessel, David Cordier, Wilfried Jochens, Hans-Georg Wimmer, Stephan Schreckenberger, Harry van der Kamp, Rheinische Kantorei, Das Kleine Konzert, conducted by Max (2004)
- JLB 8: Susanne Gorzny, Steve Wächter, Michael Zabanoff, Biederitzer Kantorei, Telemann-Consort-Magdeburg, conducted by Michael Scholl (2007)

Trauermusik, JLB 19:

- Maria Zadori, Lena Susanne Norin, Guy de Mey, Klaus Mertens, Veronika Winter, Gundula Anders, Hans Jörg Mammel, Hans-Joachim Weber, Annette Schneider, the Rheinische Kantorei and The Kleine Konzert conducted by Max (1997)

Overture in G major, JLB 20:

- Musica Antiqua Köln conducted by Reinhard Goebel (2012)
- Freiburg Baroque Orchestra conducted by Thomas Hengelbrock

Sacred cantata, JLB 21 (see also Denn du wirst meine Seele nicht in der Hölle lassen#Recordings):

- Mona Spägele, Harry Van Berne, Stephan Schreckenberger, Christiane Iven, Bremen Baroque Orchestra, Alsfelder Vokalensemble, Gesualdo Consort Amsterdam and others conducted by Wolfgang Helbich (before 2014)

Motets, JLB 27–37:

- JLB 27, 29, 31, 32, 34, 35, 36 and 37: Maria Zadori, Lena Susanne Norin, Guy de Mey, Klaus Mertens, Veronika Winter, Gundula Anders, Hans Jörg Mammel, Hans-Joachim Weber, Annette Schneider, Rheinische Kantorei and Das Kleine Konzert conducted by Max
- JLB 27, 28, 29, 30, 31, 32, 34, 35, 36 and 37: Ex tempore Gent, Orpheon Consort Wien, Florian Heyerick (2006)
- JLB 28 and 33: Choir of Clare College, Cambridge, conducted by Timothy Brown (2013)
- JLB 28, 32 and 33: Leipziger Cantorey conducted by Gotthold Schwarz (2015)
- JLB 34: Cantus Cölln conducted by Konrad Junghänel (2015)

Kyrie-Gloria Mass, JLB 38:

- Gächinger Kantorei and Bach-Collegium Stuttgart, conducted by Helmuth Rilling (1976–77, reissued 2013)
- Maria Zadori, Kai Wessel, David Cordier, Wilfried Jochens, Hans-Georg Wimmer, Stephan Schreckenberger, Harry van der Kamp, Rheinische Kantorei and Das Kleine Konzert conducted by Max (2004)
- Ex Tempore, conducted by Florian Heyerick (2012)

Concerto, JLB 39:

- Reinhard Goebel, Stephan Schardt and Musica Antiqua Köln (2012)

Kyrie–Gloria Masses BWV Anh. 25 and 167:

== Sources ==
- Beißwenger, Kirsten (2000). "Missa (Kyrie und Gloria) G-Dur (BWV Anh. 167)" [Mass (Kyrie and Gloria) G major (BWV Anh. 167)]. Lateinische Kirchenmusik, Passionen: Werke zweifelhafter Echtheit, Bearbeitungen fremder Kompositionen (Kritischer Bericht) [Latin Church Music, Passions: Works with Doubtful Authenticity, Arrangements of Music from other Composers (Critical Commentary)]. New Bach Edition (in German). Vol. II/9. Bärenreiter. ISMN 9790006494927. BA 5095-41.
- Bitter, Karl Hermann (1865). "F. Die lateinischen kurzen Messen" [F. The Latin short masses]. Johann Sebastian Bach (in German). Vol. II (1st ed.). Berlin: Schneider. pp. 111–134.
- Dörffel, Alfred (1894). Kirchenmusikwerke: Ergänzungsband [Church music: Complementary volume]. Bach-Gesellschaft Ausgabe (in German). Vol. 41. Breitkopf & Härtel.
- Dürr, Alfred; Kobayashi, Yoshitake; Beißwenger, Kirsten, eds. (1998). Bach Werke Verzeichnis: Kleine Ausgabe – Nach der von Wolfgang Schmieder vorgelegten 2. Ausgabe [Bach Works Catalogue: Small Edition – After Wolfgang Schmieder's 2nd edition] (in German and English) (BWV^{2a} ed.). Wiesbaden: Breitkopf & Härtel. ISBN 9783765102493.
- Forkel, Johann Nikolaus; Terry, Charles Sanford (1920). Johann Sebastian Bach: His Life, Art and Work – translated from the German, with notes and appendices. New York: Harcourt, Brace and Howe.
- Hilgenfeldt, Carl L. (1850). "D. Missen" [D. Masses]. Johann Sebastian Bach's Leben, Wirken und Werke: ein Beitrag zur Kunstgeschichte des achtzehnten Jahrhunderts [Johann Sebastian Bach's Life, Work and Works: A Contribution to Art History of the Eighteenth Century] (in German). Leipzig: Friedrich Hofmeister. pp. 115–117.
- Schicht, Johann Gottfried, ed. (1805). Messa a 8 voci reali e 4 ripiene coll'accompagnamento di due Orchestre, composta da Giov. Sebast. Bach: Partitura, copiata dalla partitura autografa dell' Autore [Mass in eight real voices and four additional voices, accompanied by two Orchestras, composed by Joh. Sebast. Bach: Score, copied from the autograph score of the Author] (in Italian and Latin). Leipzig: Breitkopf & Härtel. Harvard Digital Collections.
- Spitta, Philipp (1899). Johann Sebastian Bach: His Work and Influence on the Music of Germany, 1685–1750. Translated by Bell, Clara; Fuller Maitland, John Alexander. Novello & Co.
  - volume I
  - volume II
  - volume III
- Wollny, Peter (2015). "Vom „apparat der auserleßensten kirchen Stücke" zum „Vorrath an Musicalien, von J. S. Bach und andern berühmten Musicis": Quellenkundliche Ermittlungen zur frühen Thüringer Bach-Überlieferung und zu einigen Weimarer Schülern und Kollegen Bachs". Bach-Jahrbuch 2015 [Bach Yearbook 2015]. Bach-Jahrbuch (in German). Vol. 101. Leipzig: Evangelische Verlagsanstalt. ISBN 978-3-374-04320-0. ISSN 0084-7682.
