= Kyrie–Gloria Mass for double choir, BWV Anh. 167 =

Sacral composition of uncertain authorship

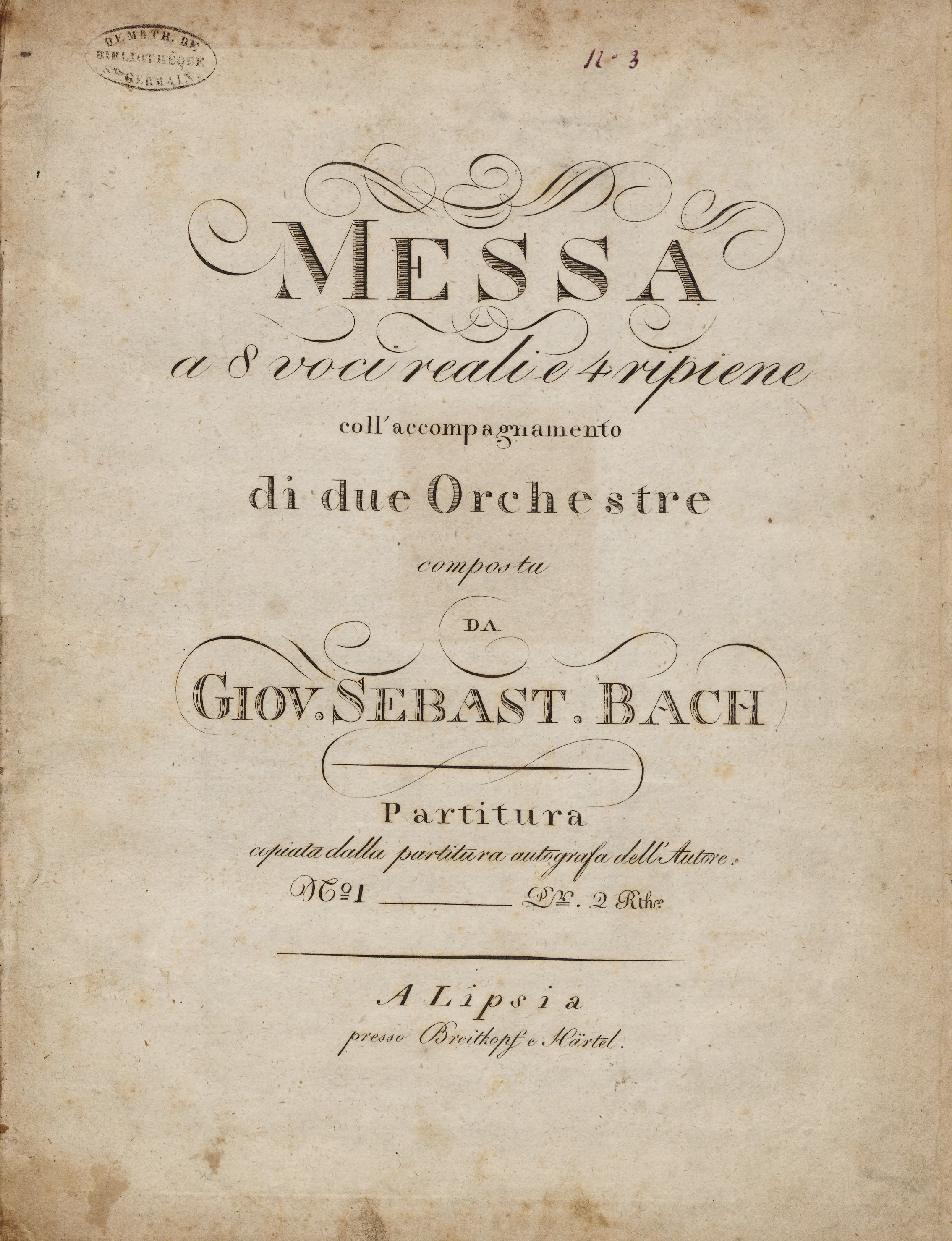
Title page of the 1805 edition of the Missa, BWV Anh. 167 – then attributed to Johann Sebastian Bach.

The Kyrie–Gloria Mass for double choir, BWV Anh. 167, is a mass composition in G major by an unknown composer. The work was likely composed in the last quarter of the 17th century. The composition has two sections, a Kyrie and a Gloria, each subdivided in three movements. It has twenty-two parts for performers: twelve parts for singers, and ten for instrumentalists, including strings, wind instruments and organ. Johann Sebastian Bach may have encountered the work around 1710, when he was employed in Weimar. In the 1730s he produced a manuscript copy of the Mass.

The Mass played an important role in Bach reception of the early 19th century; at the time it was published and performed as one of the composer's significant works. Scholarship published in the second half of the 19th century contested the work's attribution to Bach, proposing Antonio Lotti, or alternatively Johann Ludwig Bach, as possible composer of the work. In the 20th-century Bach-Werke-Verzeichnis (BWV; lit. 'Bach Works Catalogue'), it was initially listed as a composition spuriously attributed to Bach, while later being classified as a doubtful composition by the composer. The work was recorded in the 21st century, and, in scholarship, Christoph Bernhard, Johann Philipp Krieger or David Pohle were mentioned as its possible composer.

== History ==
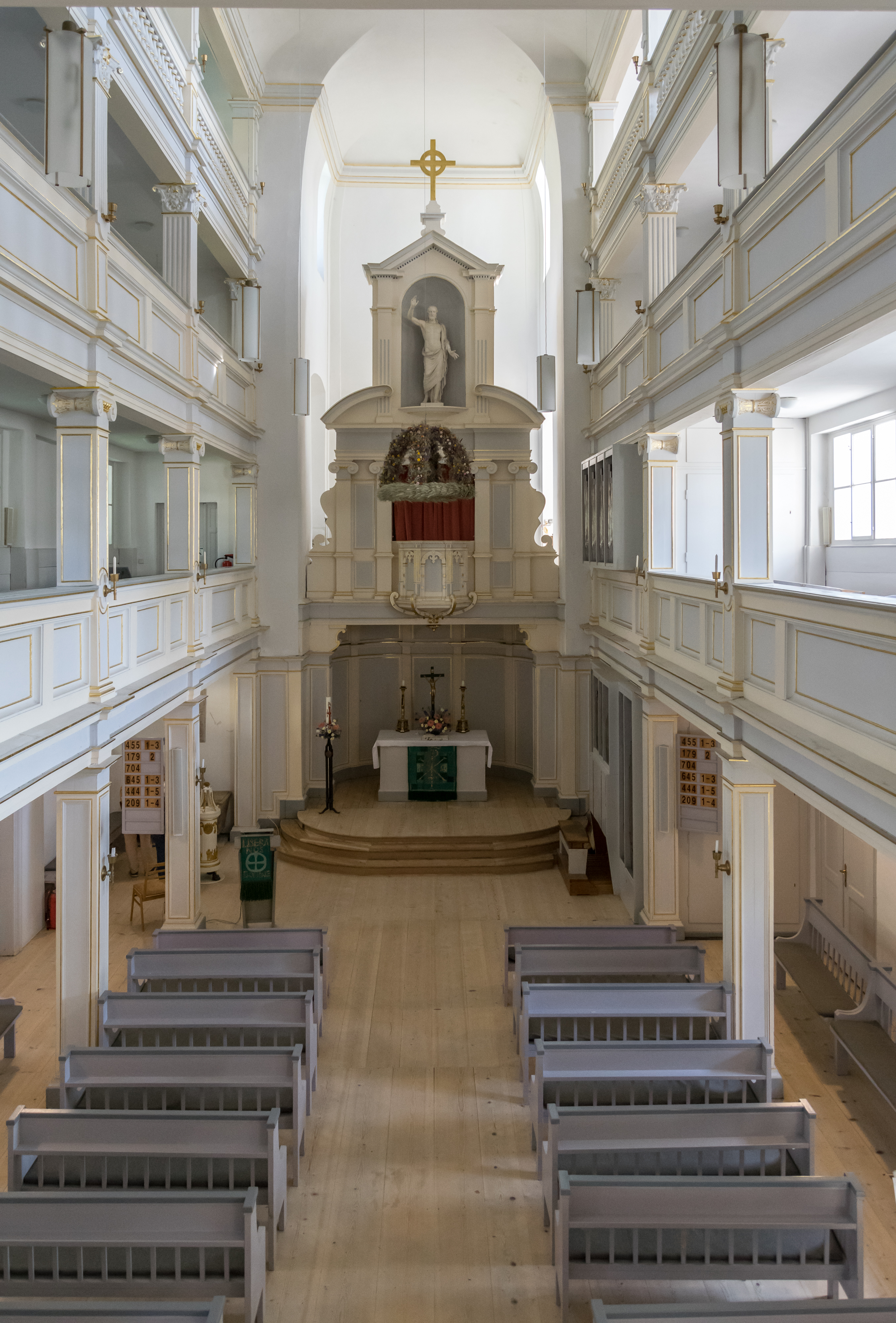
St Jacob's Church in Weimar, where the Mass BWV Anh. 167 may have been performed under Johann Sebastian Bach's direction in 1713.

The Kyrie–Gloria Mass for double choir, BWV Anh. 167, BNB I/An/3, was likely composed in the last quarter of the 17th century. The oldest extant source of its music is a manuscript score dating from the 1730s, which was partially written by Johann Sebastian Bach.

=== Weimar ===
Peter Wollny assumes that a copy of the work may have been brought back from the Spanish Netherlands by Ernest Augustus of Saxe-Weimar in 1707. A year later, he employed Bach for his court in Weimar. The Mass may have been performed under Bach's direction at the inauguration of Weimar's St Jacob's Church on 6 November 1713. When Bach left the duchy of Saxe-Weimar in 1717, he may have taken performance parts of the Mass with him, leaving the score from which he had derived these in Weimar.

=== Bach's manuscript ===
Bach's extant manuscript of the Mass originated in the 1730s: the copy is a score likely derived from performance parts. The first part of the manuscript was written by one of Bach's scribes, who started the copy around 1732–35, while Bach himself completed the handwritten score around 1738–39. The faded original header of the manuscript carries no (clearly discernible) composer indication. The indication "J. S. Bach" found in the header is a later addition. Bach's copy is classified as Mus.ms. Bach P 659 at the Berlin State Library. It is considered an original source in Bach scholarship.

=== Authorship ===
Up to the middle of the 19th century Bach was seen as the composer of the work. In the second half of that century, Johann Sebastian's authorship was rejected, or at least questioned, in scholarship, and Antonio Lotti and Johann Ludwig Bach were mentioned as possible composers of the Mass. By the end of the 20th century, the same two composers were still mentioned as the possible authors of the work. In the 21st century, Christoph Bernhard (1628–1692), Johann Philipp Krieger (1649–1725) or David Pohle (1624–1695) were mentioned as probable composers of the work, indicating that the work was likely composed in the last quarter of the 17th century.

== Structure and scoring ==
The Mass BWV Anh. 167 consists of two sections: a Kyrie and a Gloria, and is thus a Missa brevis in a format customary of 17th- and 18th-century Protestantism. All movements of the composition are in G major. Except for the wind instruments, written down in B♭ major, the score is notated in G Mixolydian:

The monumental work is written for double choir, consisting of two groups of SATB singers, and each of these groups of singers are accompanied by a group of instrumentalists, with the instrumentalist groups each consisting of five independent voices:

- Choir I: SATB singers and a string ensemble consisting of two parts for violins, two parts for violas, and one part for violone.
- Choir II, consisting of:
  - SATB singers, three oboes (in A), a taille (in A) and violone/basso continuo.
  - SATB ripieno singers and organ.

The ripieno singers and organ are sometimes seen as a separate choir: some of the older descriptions of the Mass refer to it as a Mass for triple choir (German: Dreichörige Messe). According to Johann Kirnberger, the ripieno voices double melody lines of other singers, with there thus being no independent voices: they provide variety and are intended as a reinforcement of the second choir. According to the same author, the B♭ major key signature for the oboe parts implies that the intended instruments for these parts are in fact oboes d'amore. According to 21st-century scholarship, the B♭ major notation of the four wind instruments (three oboes and taille) is due to these instruments being tuned in Kammerton, while singers and strings follow the high Chorton of the organ, a minor third higher than the Kammerton, as was customary in Johann Sebastian Bach's Weimar. According to Wollny, the wind instruments in the original 17th-century composition were likely cornetts and trombones, with the transcription of the music for these instruments to oboes and taille being due to Bach.

=== Kyrie ===
The Kyrie of the Mass has the usual subdivisions:

1. Kyrie I: (adagio – presto).
2. Christe: (allabreve).
3. Kyrie II: 3/2.

=== Gloria ===
The eldest extant manuscript of the Mass has no written out intonation for the "Gloria in excelsis Deo" opening words of the Gloria (indicated as "Gloria tacet" in the manuscript), thus the music starts with "Et in terra pax". The music of the Gloria section has these subdivisions:

1. Et in terra pax:.
2. Gratias agimus tibi: 3/2.
3. Domine Deus: (adagio).

== Reception ==
Several copies of the Kyrie–Gloria Mass for double choir were manufactured in the second half of the 18th century. As far as extant, these indicate Bach as its composer. Kirnberger, who had been a student of Bach, saw great qualities in the composition:

Diese von Joh. Seb. Bach für zwey Chöre componirte Meße ... ist ein vollkommenes Muster sich danach in dieser Gattung zu belehren.
1) wegen der Abwechslung beyder Chöre und
2) bey der Vereinigung beider Chöre eine Belehrung wegen des vielstimmigen Sazes.

— Johann Kirnberger
Translation:

This Mass, composed for two choirs by Joh. Seb. Bach, ... is a perfect example of a work of this type, to be studied,

1. for the variety of both choirs, and,
2. when both choirs join, an instruction because of its polyphonic setting.

— Translation

A further manuscript copy of the Mass was produced around 1800.

=== First half of the 19th century ===
The Mass played a significant role in Bach reception of the early 19th century, when it was seen as one of his main works. In his biography of Bach, Johann Nikolaus Forkel listed the work among Bach's vocal compositions:

3) Eine zweychörige Misse. Der erste Chor ist mit Saiten- und der zweyte mit Blase-Instrumenten begleitet.

— Johann Nikolaus Forkel (1802)
Translation:

3. A Mass for double chorus, the first being accompanied by Strings and the second by wind instruments.

— Translated by Charles Sanford Terry (1920)

A few years later, in March 1805, the Mass was performed as Bach's in the Gewandhaus in Leipzig. The next month, Johann Friedrich Rochlitz described his impressions of the work performed at the concert in the Allgemeine musikalische Zeitung:

... wie ein aus den Ruinen der grauen Vorzeit herausgegrabener Obelisk ... erfüllte das Gemüth mit einem Schauer der Ehrfurcht gegen die Kraft und Gewalt der Vorfahren, u. gegen das Grosse und Heilige ihrer Kunst ... nicht etwa, wie Viele befürchten möchten, finster, überkünstlich, nur gelehrt, sondern, bey aller Tiefe und allem Reichthum, äusserst einfach, klar und so gearbeitet sind, dass man ihnen, bey Empfänglichkeit und Aufmerksamkeit, überall sehr gut folgen kann.

— Johann Friedrich Rochlitz (1805)
Translation:

... as an obelisk, unearthed from the ruins of a grey prehistory ... filled the mind with a shudder of respect for the force and power of the ancestors, and for what is great and sacred in their art ... not something, as many might fear, dark, artificial, only learned, but, with all its depth and richness, extremely uncomplicated, clear, and executed thus that someone who is susceptible and attentive can follow it very well everywhere.

— Translation

Later that same year the Mass was published by Breitkopf & Härtel as Messa a 8 voci reali e 4 ripiene coll'accompagnamento di due Orchestre, composta da Giov. Sebast. Bach: Partitura, copiata dalla partitura autografa dell' Autore. Although the title suggests that Johann Gottfried Schicht, the editor of this publication, closely followed the P 659 manuscript, he amended it in several ways, including:

- The figuration of the basso continuo was completed where lacking in the original manuscript.
- Parts for bassoon complemented and/or replaced parts written for other instruments in both choirs.
- A Gloria intonation, based on the opening measures of the Kyrie, was inserted as a replacement of the "Gloria tacet" opening of the Gloria section.

In 1812, Danish composer Peter Grønland produced performance material for the Mass, apparently based on the 1805 print. Around 1821–30, Carl Friedrich Zelter produced a copy, with his own modifications, of the Mass: this score, once in the archive of the Berliner Singakademie, went missing in the Second World War. Carl L. Hilgenfeld listed the Mass as a composition by Bach in his 1850 biography of the composer.

=== Second half of the 19th century ===
In 1858, the Bach Gesellschaft considered whether the work should be included in their edition of the complete works of Bach (Bach-Gesellschaft Ausgabe, BGA). Wilhelm Rust explains, in his preface to Vol. 11.1 of that edition, why he considers the work inauthentic, despite Kirnberger's favourable testimony:

Kirnberger's Autorität haben wir freilich in dieser Frage gegen uns. Allein, ..., müssen wir annehmen, dass ... hier ein Irrthum obwaltet. Bach's Antheil an dem Werke ist vielleicht ein ähnlicher, wie bei dem für vier Clavieren arrangirten Vivaldi'schen Concerte. Dagegen findet sich selbst in seinen kleinsten und schwächsten Werken kein Satz, wie z. B. das Allegro des ersten Kyrie, welches, volkommen homophon, 40 Takte lang bei einem ebenso oft wiederkehrenden monotonen Rhythmus beharrt.

— Wilhelm Rust (1862)
Translation:

Admittedly, we have Kirnberger's authority against us in this question. Only ..., we must suppose that ... an error is apparent. Bach's contribution to the work is probably comparable to that of his arrangement for four keyboards of Vivaldi's concerto. By contrast, even in his most insignificant and weakest works, there is no movement as, for instance, the Allegro of the first Kyrie, which soldiers on, completely homophonic, in a monotonous rhythm, 40 measures long.

— Translation

In 1865, Karl Hermann Bitter suggested Lotti as composer of the work. 15 years later, Philipp Spitta did the same, although, according to this author, the style of the work is not completely compatible with Lotti's and he thinks it may, alternatively, have been composed by another Italian, or by a German composer writing in the Italian style. In 1894 Alfred Dörffel returned to the issue in a BGA preface, suggesting Johann Ludwig Bach as possible composer of the work. Also the volume with which the BGA closes in 1899 mentions the work in its preface, which was written by Hermann Kretzschmar, reconfirming that the work can not be attributed to Johann Sebastian.

=== 20th century ===
In 1920, Charles Sanford Terry wrote that it was generally held that the Mass was not by Bach, asserting that it had been attributed to Johann Ludwig Bach. Wolfgang Schmieder followed Dörffel's and Kretzschmar's judgements about the inauthenticity of the work in his 1950 first edition of the Bach-Werke-Verzeichnis (BWV), where it is classified as No. 167 in the third Anhang, that is the Annex of spurious works, hence its full BWV number: BWV Anh. III 167. In his 1990 second edition of the BWV, Schmieder kept the work listed in Anh. III. According to Schmieder the work is attributed to Johann Ludwig Bach or Antonio Lotti.

In the 1998 edition of the BWV (known as BWV^{2a}), edited by Alfred Dürr and Yoshitake Kobayashi, the positions of several doubtful and spurious works were reshuffled in the Anhang sections, following a new methodology explained in the preface of this edition. For BWV Anh. 167, this meant that it was repositioned in Anh. II, that is the Anhang section of the doubtful works, instead of formerly in Anh. III (spurious works). Like its predecessor, the BGA, also the New Bach Edition (NBE) decided, in the second half of the 20th century, not to include BWV Anh. 167 in its publication of all works by Johann Sebastian Bach. In the Critical Commentary of the ninth volume of its second series (Masses, Passions, Oratorios), Kirsten Beißwenger describes the Mass.

=== 21st century ===
The Missa in G major, BWV Anh. 167, is included, with a recording time of 13:31, in Apocryphal Bach Masses II, cpo 777561-2, by Wolfgang Helbich conducting the Alsfelder Vokalensemble (recorded 2009, released 2012). In 2014, this recording was re-issued in the eight CD Box The Sacred Apocryphal Bach. In the Bach-Jahrbuch of 2015, Wollny published an article detailing some particulars of the composition, including a tentative attribution of the composition to Bernhard, Krieger or Pohle.

== Sources ==
=== By title ===
- "Am.B 4a". Berlin State Library (in German). 4 March 2013.
- "Apocryphal Bach Masses II". ArkivMusic. 709036. Archived from the original on 18 September 2020.
- "Apocryphal Bach Masses II". Muziekweb. DBX10365.
- "D-B Am.B 4". Bach Digital. Leipzig: Bach Archive; et al. 2017-11-20.
- D-B Am.B 4. 452502955 – via RISM.
- "D-B Am.B 4a". Bach Digital. Leipzig: Bach Archive; et al. 2020-06-17.
- D-B Am.B 4a. 452502956 – via RISM.
- "D-B Mus.ms. Bach P 659". Bach Digital. Leipzig: Bach Archive; et al. 2021-03-04.
- D-B Mus.ms. Bach P 659. 467065900 – via RISM.
- "D-B Mus.ms. Bach P 660". Bach Digital. Leipzig: Bach Archive; et al. 2020-01-12.
- "DK-A R 141". Bach Digital. Leipzig: Bach Archive; et al. 2018-09-17.
- DK-A R 141. 150203364 – via RISM.
- "H. Baron, Catalogue No. 167". Bach Digital. Leipzig: Bach Archive; et al. 2017-11-08.
- "Missa (Kyrie and Gloria), G BWV Anh. 167". Bach Digital. Leipzig: Bach Archive; et al. 2021-03-04.
- "Mus.ms. Bach P 659". Berlin State Library (in German). 5 September 2016.
- "The Sacred Apocryphal Bach". ArkivMusic. 1153384.

=== By author ===
- Beißwenger, Kirsten (1992). Johann Sebastian Bachs Notenbibliothek [Johann Sebastian Bach's musical library]. Catalogus musicus (in German). Vol. XIII. Bärenreiter. ISBN 9783761810361. OCLC 680040660.
- — (2000). "Missa (Kyrie und Gloria) G-Dur (BWV Anh. 167)" [Mass (Kyrie and Gloria) G major (BWV Anh. 167)]. Lateinische Kirchenmusik, Passionen: Werke zweifelhafter Echtheit, Bearbeitungen fremder Kompositionen (Kritischer Bericht) [Latin Church Music, Passions: Works with Doubtful Authenticity, Arrangements of Music from other Composers (Critical Commentary)]. New Bach Edition (in German). Vol. II/9. Bärenreiter. ISMN 9790006494927. BA 5095-41.
- Bitter, Karl Hermann (1865). "F. Die lateinischen kurzen Messen" [F. The Latin short masses]. Johann Sebastian Bach (in German). Vol. II (1st ed.). Berlin: Schneider. pp. 111–134.
- Dörffel, Alfred (1884). "Statistik der Concerte im Saale des Gewandhauses zu Leipzig" [Statistic of the concerts in the Gewandhaus hall in Leipzig]. Geschichte der Gewandhausconcerte zu Leipzig vom 25. November 1781 bis 25. November 1881: Im Auftrage der Concert-Direction verfasst [History of the Gewandhaus concerts in Leipzig from 25 November 1781 to 25 November 1881: As commissioned by the concert direction] (in German). Leipzig: Gewandhaus.
- — (1894). "Vorwort" [Preface]. Kirchenmusikwerke: Ergänzungsband [Church music: Complementary volume] (in German). Vol. 41. Bach Gesellschaft. Breitkopf & Härtel. pp. XIII–XL.
- Dürr, Alfred; Kobayashi, Yoshitake, eds. (1998). Bach Werke Verzeichnis: Kleine Ausgabe – Nach der von Wolfgang Schmieder vorgelegten 2. Ausgabe [Bach Works Catalogue: Small Edition – After Wolfgang Schmieder's 2nd edition] (in German). Kirsten Beißwenger (collaborator). (BWV^{2a} ed.). Wiesbaden: Breitkopf & Härtel. ISBN 9783765102493. Preface in English and German.
- Ebata, Nobuaki, ed. (2018-03-05). "Lost Sing-Akademie BWV Anh. 167". Bach Digital. Leipzig: Bach Archive; et al.
- Forkel, Johann Nikolaus (1802). Ueber Johann Sebastian Bachs Leben, Kunst und Kunstwerke: Für patriotische Verehrer echter musikalischer Kunst (in German). Leipzig: Hoffmeister & Kühnel.
- — (1920). Johann Sebastian Bach: His Life, Art and Work – translated from the German, with notes and appendices. Translated by Terry, Charles Sanford. New York: Harcourt, Brace and Howe.
- Hilgenfeldt, Carl L. (1850). "D. Missen" [D. Masses]. Johann Sebastian Bach's Leben, Wirken und Werke: ein Beitrag zur Kunstgeschichte des achtzehnten Jahrhunderts [Johann Sebastian Bach's Life, Work and Works: A Contribution to Art History of the Eighteenth Century] (in German). Leipzig: Friedrich Hofmeister. pp. 115–117.
- Kretzschmar, Hermann (1899). "Vorwort" [Preface]. Schlussband: Bericht and Verzeichnisse [Closing volume: Notice and catalogues] (in German). Vol. 46. Bach Gesellschaft. Breitkopf & Härtel. pp. XVII–LXIII.
- Rimbach, Evangeline (2005). "The Sacred Vocal Music of Johann Kuhnau". In Messerli, Carlos R. (ed.). Thine the Amen: Essays on Lutheran Church Music in Honor of Carl Schalk. Marty, Martin E. (Foreword). Kirk House Publishers. pp. 83–110. ISBN 9781932688115.
- Rochlitz, Johann Friedrich, ed. (24 April 1805). "Nachrichten" [Messages]. Allgemeine musikalische Zeitung (in German). VII (30). Leipzig: Breitkopf & Härtel.
- Rust, Wilhelm (1862). "Vorwort" [Preface]. Magnificat D dur und vier Sanctus [Magnificat in D major and four Sanctuses] (in German). Vol. 11. Bach Gesellschaft. Breitkopf & Härtel. pp. XIII–XXI. MDZ: bsb11131456
- Schicht, Johann Gottfried, ed. (1805). Messa a 8 voci reali e 4 ripiene coll'accompagnamento di due Orchestre, composta da Giov. Sebast. Bach: Partitura, copiata dalla partitura autografa dell' Autore [Mass in eight real voices and four additional voices, accompanied by two Orchestras, composed by Joh. Sebast. Bach: Score, copied from the autograph score of the Author] (in Italian and Latin). Leipzig: Breitkopf & Härtel. Harvard Digital Collections.
- Schmieder, Wolfgang, ed. (1990). Thematisch-systematisches Verzeichnis der musikalischen Werke von Johann Sebastian Bach: Bach-Werke-Verzeichnis – 2. überarbeitete und erweiterte Ausgabe [Thematic-Systematic Catalogue of the Musical Works of Johann Sebastian Bach: Bach-Works-Catalogue – 2nd reworked and enlarged edition] (in German) (BWV^{2} ed.). Wiesbaden: Breitkopf & Härtel. ISBN 9783765102554.
- Spitta, Philipp (1880). Johann Sebastian Bach (in German). Vol. II. Leipzig: Breitkopf & Härtel.
- — (1899). Johann Sebastian Bach: His Work and Influence on the Music of Germany, 1685–1750 (in German). Translated by Bell, Clara; Fuller Maitland, John Alexander. Novello & Co. Vol. I, Vol. II, Vol. III – via Internet Archive
- Wollny, Peter (2015). "Vom "apparat der auserleßensten kirchen Stücke" zum "Vorrath an Musicalien, von J. S. Bach und andern berühmten Musicis": Quellenkundliche Ermittlungen zur frühen Thüringer Bach-Überlieferung und zu einigen Weimarer Schülern und Kollegen Bachs". Bach-Jahrbuch 2015. Bach-Jahrbuch (in German). Vol. 101. Neue Bachgesellschaft. Leipzig: Evangelische Verlagsanstalt. pp. 99–154. doi:10.13141/bjb.v2015. ISBN 978-3-374-04320-0. ISSN 0084-7682 – via Qucosa.
