= Biographies of Johann Sebastian Bach =

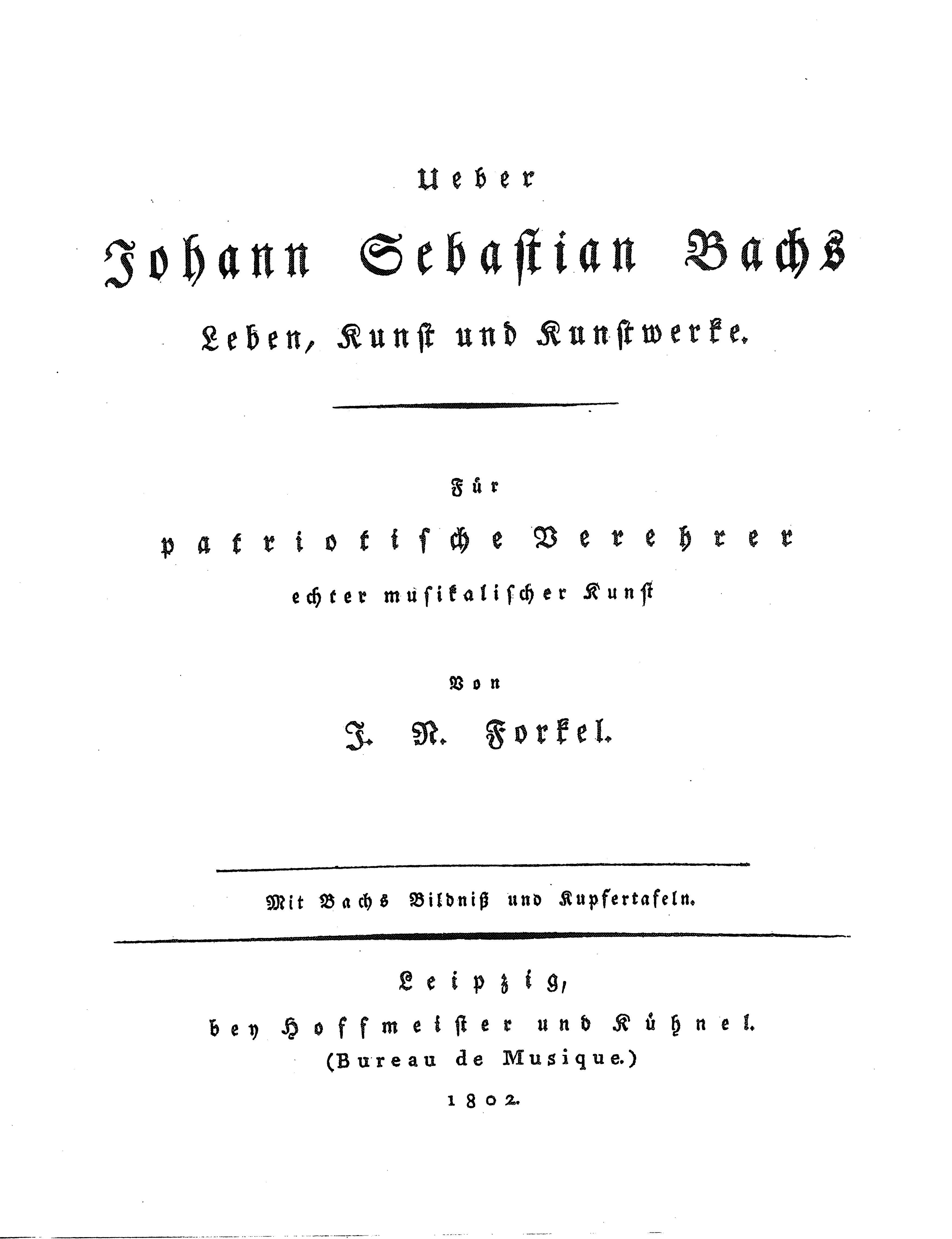
Title page of Johann Nikolaus Forkel's 1802 biography of Johann Sebastian Bach

The first major biographies of Johann Sebastian Bach, including those by Johann Nikolaus Forkel and Philipp Spitta, were published in the 19th century. Many more were published in the 20th century by, among others, Albert Schweitzer, Charles Sanford Terry, Christoph Wolff and Klaus Eidam.

== 18th century ==
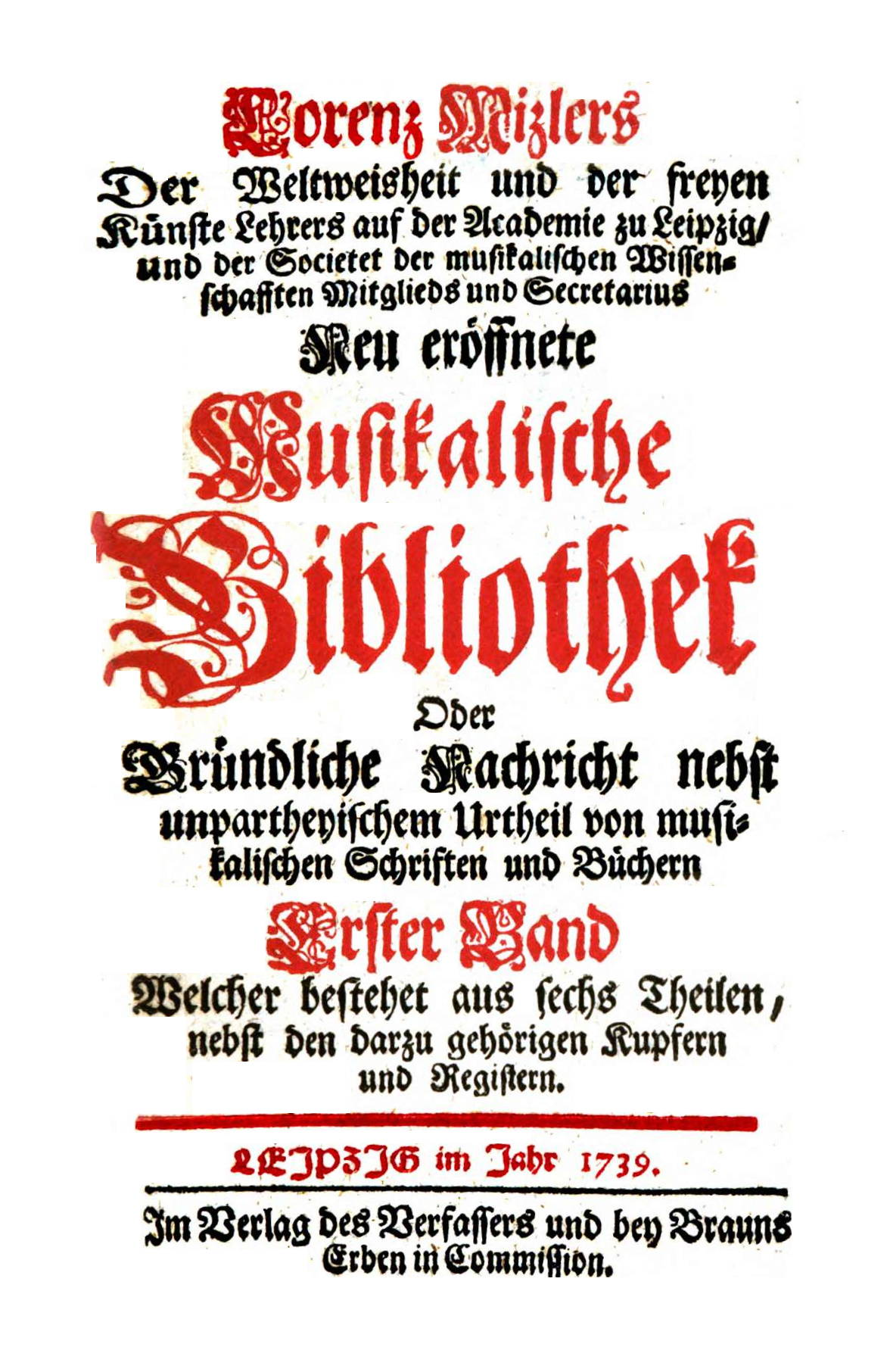
Title page of the first volume of Mizler's Musikalische Bibliothek (1739). Its fourth part (first published in April 1738) contained an article defending Bach's art against the criticism Johann Adolph Scheibe had published in May 1737. The 1754 last volume of the Musikalische Bibliothek (IV, 1) contained Bach's obituary.

Little was published about Bach's life in the 18th century, his "Nekrolog" (obituary) being the most extended biographical note about the composer's life.

=== Contemporary biographical sources ===
No writings by Johann Sebastian Bach were published during his lifetime. He declined Johann Mattheson's invitation to write an autobiographical sketch for inclusion in the Ehrenpforte. There is little biographical material to be found in the compositions published during his lifetime: the glimpse perceived from the dedication of The Musical Offering to Frederick the Great being a small exception. There are however some letters by the composer in which he gives autobiographical detail, including the letter he wrote in 1730 to Georg Erdmann, and the letter he had joined to the score of his Mass for the Dresden court in 1733. Other contemporary sources include archived reports, like those of the decisions of the Leipzig city council.

Contemporary publications, like Johann Mattheson's Beschützte Orchestre, Johann Adolph Scheibe's Critischer Musicus and Lorenz Christoph Mizler's Musikalische Bibliothek, rather write about Bach's music than about his life. Bach's entry in Johann Gottfried Walther's 1732 Lexikon is a rare exception in giving biographical information on the composer.

=== Bach's obituary ===
Bach's "Nekrolog" was published in 1754 in the fourth volume of Mizler's Musikalische Bibliothek. With less than 20 pages it is the most comprehensive 18th-century publication on the composer's life.

=== Other 18th century biographical material ===
For the remainder of the century short biographies of the composer appeared in reference works like Johann Adam Hiller's Lebensbeschreibungen berühmter Musikgelehrten und Tonkünstler neurer Zeit, Ernst Ludwig Gerber's Historisch-biographisches Lexikon der Tonkünstler and Friedrich Carl Gottlieb Hirsching's Historisch-literarisches Handbuch. The descriptions in such biographical articles were nearly exclusively based on the "Nekrolog", often copied with errors.

Occasionally Bach appears in other writings, like Johann Friedrich Köhler's 1776 manuscript on the history of schools in Leipzig, which gives a short account of Bach falling out with Johann August Ernesti, conrector of the St. Thomas School. In print Bach is mentioned as teacher of some musicians of the next generation, for instance Christoph Nichelmann.

== 19th century ==
Forkel's biography was published shortly after the 50th anniversary of the composer's death, and concentrated mostly on an analysis of his compositions. The first biography based on an extensive research of primary sources was published by Spitta in the second half of the 19th century.

=== Forkel's biography ===
Johann Nikolaus Forkel's Ueber Johann Sebastian Bachs Leben, Kunst und Kunstwerke (Johann Sebastian Bach: His Life, Art, and Work) appeared in Leipzig in 1802. Its biographical material expands what is already in the "Nekrolog" with details Forkel collected from Bach's eldest sons. An English translation, expanded with updates in footnotes and appendices, was published in 1920 by Charles Sanford Terry.

=== Centennial biographies ===
A century after the composer's death two short biographies were published. Joh. Carl Schauer published Joh. Seb. Bach's Lebensbild : Eine Denkschrift auf seinem 100 jährigen Todestag, den 28. Jul. 1850, aus Thüringen, seinem Vaterlande, and Carl L. Hilgenfeldt published Johann Sebastian Bach's Leben, Wirken und Werke: ein Beitrag zur Kunstgeschichte des achtzehnten Jahrhunderts (Johann Sebastian Bach's life, influence and works: a contribution to the art history of the 18th century) "als Programm zu dem am 28. Julius 1850 eintretenden Säculartage des Todes von Johann Sebastian Bach" (as a program for the centennial days of Johann Sebastian Bach's death, starting 28 July 1850).

=== Bitter's multi-volume biography ===
In 1865 Karl Hermann Bitter published a two-volume Bach biography. The biography contains some documents from Bach's time that had not been published before, presented with a wealth of historical inferences and personal reflections. An abridged English translation of the biography appeared in 1873. Shortly after becoming Prussian minister of finance in 1879, Bitter published an enlarged reworking in four volumes of the biography.

=== Spitta's comprehensive biography ===
Philipp Spitta's Johann Sebastian Bach was published in Leipzig in two volumes, in 1873 and 1880 respectively. Its English translation was published by Novello in three volumes.

In his introduction Spitta dismisses all previous biographies apart from the "Nekrolog", Forkel, and part of Gerber. He is particularly harsh on Bitter. Spitta's biography went down in history as "... the most ... comprehensive and important single work on Johann Sebastian Bach". It eclipsed the previous biographies and laid down premises and methodology for future Bach scholarship.

=== Bach-biography in English ===
In the United Kingdom the 19th-century Bach Revival was inscribed in existing traditions respecting baroque music. The Bach-biographies that were published in English were throughout the century largely based on German examples. An amateurish translation of Forkel had appeared in London in 1820. Edward Francis Rimbault had published his Hilgenfeldt/Forkel adaptation in 1869. An abridged version of Bitter's first edition had appeared in 1873. In 1882 the first original English biography appeared, Reginald Lane Poole's Sebastian Bach. Lane Poole bases the biographical data entirely on Spitta, and adds a chronological list of 200 church cantatas by Bach. By the mid-1880s the translation of Spitta's volumes was complete.

=== 1890s ===
Richard Batka published his biography of the composer in 1892, as part of the Musiker-Biographien series.

== 20th century ==
New biographies were written by Schweitzer and Terry in the first half of the 20th century. Only by the end of the century, quarter of a millennium after the composer's death, new major biographies appeared by Eidam and Wolff.

=== First Decade ===
By the end of the 19th century the Bach Gesellschaft had completed its task of publishing all known works by Bach. The first decade of the new century brought new significant biographies of the composer.

==== Schweitzer ====
Albert Schweitzer's Johann Sebastian Bach, le musicien-poète appeared in 1905. It analyses Bach's works primarily from a religious perspective. Its 1908 German edition was enlarged, and more content was added to the 1911 English version.

==== Pirro ====
In 1906 André Pirro published a Bach-biography in France. The biography became available in English in 1957, based on the 1949 enlarged French edition.

==== Parry ====
In 1909 a new English-language biography of Bach appeared, written by Hubert Parry. In its preface the author pays his homage to Spitta and excuses him for his specialised technicalities: for his new biography Parry proposes a more condensed survey of the topic. Parry shows Bach chauvinism by designating everything what was composed in the 17th century as immature.

=== Biographical fiction ===
In 1925 Esther Meynell published The Little Chronicle of Magdalena Bach, fictitiously telling the story of Bach's life through the eyes of his second wife Anna Magdalena Bach. The Chronicle of Anna Magdalena Bach, a 1968 film featuring Gustav Leonhardt as Johann Sebastian Bach, took the same perspective.

=== Terry ===
Charles Sanford Terry's Bach biography of 1928 focusses on the places where Bach lived. It is the first biography that contains biographical documents not yet included in Spitta's.

=== Gurlitt ===
Bach's 250th birthday was remembered with a short biography by Wilibald Gurlitt, "Niederschrift des Jubiläumsvortrages bei der Bach-Feier des Ev. Studentenpfarramtes der Universität Freiburg i.Br. im Sommersemester 1935" (written out version of the jubilee speech at the Bach feast of the evangelical student community of the university of Freiburg im Breisgau, in the summer semester of 1935). Published in 1936, it was translated in English in 1957. An enlarged German edition was published in 1980.

=== From 1945 to the 1970s ===
In 1950, two centuries after the composer's death, Wolfgang Schmieder published the BWV catalogue. The decades following World War II also saw the publication of a number of biographical works.

==== Bach Reader ====
Hans Theodor David and Arthur Mendel published The Bach Reader: A Life of Johann Sebastian Bach in Letters and Documents in 1945. It was revised as The New Bach Reader by Christoph Wolff in 1998.

==== Cherbuliez ====
Swiss musicologist Antoine-Elisée Cherbuliez (1888–1964) derives the biographical material for his 1946 Bach biography essentially from the "Nekrolog", and the biographies by Forkel, Spitta and Terry.

==== Neumann – Bach Archive ====
Werner Neumann, from 1951 director of the East-German section of the Neue Bach-Ausgabe (NBA), published several biographies of the composer. In 1953 Auf den Lebenswegen Johann Sebastian Bachs, acclaimed by Alfred Dürr, the director of the West-German section of the NBA. An enlarged German edition was issued in 1962. In 1960 Bach: eine Bildbiographie was published. These two works were translated as Bach and his world and Bach: A Pictorial Biography

Under Neumann's direction, from its founding in 1950 until he retired in 1973, the Leipzig Bach Archive published biographical material about Bach, for instance in 1970 the Kalendarium zur Lebensgeschichte Johann Sebastian Bachs (time table to the history of Johann Sebastian Bach's life). Hans-Joachim Schulze, Neumann's successor as director of the Archive, revised this Kalendarium for its second edition in 1979.

==== Miles ====
In 1962 Russell Hancock Miles published Johann Sebastian Bach: an Introduction to His Life and Works.

==== Geiringer ====
In 1966 Karl and Irene Geiringer published Johann Sebastian Bach: The Culmination of An Era.

==== 1970s essay collections ====
Walter Blankenburg published an essay collection, with contributions by scholars such as Dürr and David, in 1970. In 1976 Barbara Schwendowius and Wolfgang Dömling published a collection of eleven essays by, among others, Wolff and Dürr under the title Johann Sebastian Bach : Zeit, Leben, Wirken. The next year the book was translated as Johann Sebastian Bach: Life, Times, Influence.

=== Basso ===
Around 1980 Alberto Basso published the two volumes of his Italian Bach-biography Frau Musika. The biography largely follows Spitta's model, with updates to intermediate research.

=== Around Bach's 300th birthday ===
In the years leading up to Bach's 300th birthday in 1985 some new biographies were published. Malcolm Boyd's Bach appeared in 1983. Denis Arnold's Bach appeared the next year, as well as a new French biography by Roland de Candé, and a German one by Werner Felix. That last one was translated into English in 1985. Piero Buscaroli's Italian biography appeared in 1985.

=== Turn of the century ===
Around the 250th anniversary of Bach's death (2000) several new biographies were published, along with reprints and revised editions of earlier publications.

==== Butt ====
John Butt collaborated to several publications on Bach. In 1997 he was the editor of the Cambridge Companion to Bach, with chapters written by Malcolm Boyd, Ulrich Siegele, Robin A. Leaver, Stephen A. Crist, Werner Breig, Richard D. P. Jones, Laurence Dreyfus, Stephen Daw, George B. Stauffer and Martin Zenck.

==== Eidam ====
Klaus Eidam's 1999 Das Wahre Leben des Johann Sebastian Bach (The True Life of Johann Sebastian Bach) tries to correct some misconceptions that crept in the biographical writing on the composer, based on a new perusal of primary sources.

==== Wolff ====
Christoph Wolff, a Bach scholar, wrote his major biographical work on Bach, Johann Sebastian Bach: The Learned Musician, in 2000. In 1998 Wolff had revised David and Mendel's Bach Reader into The New Bach Reader. In 1999 a compilation of Bach-related essays Wolff wrote between 1963 and 1988 had its fourth reprint.

==== Geck ====
Also in 2000 Martin Geck published Bach: Leben und Werk, six years later translated as Johann Sebastian Bach: Life and Work. A previous shorter work by Geck, with a focus on illustrative material, was translated as Bach in 2000.

==== 't Hart ====
Maarten 't Hart's biography, focussing on Bach's cantatas, appeared in Dutch and German in 2000.

== 21st century ==
In the 21st century a sizeable portion of biographical material on Johann Sebastian Bach became available on-line, including full scans of older biographies that were no longer copyrighted. Andreas Glöckner's revised edition of the 1970s Kalendarium was published in 2008. This, in turn, formed the basis for the jsbach website, presenting data about Bach's life in time table format. New biographies were written by Williams and Gardiner.

=== Williams ===
In 2004 a new English biography of Bach, written by Peter Williams, was published by the Cambridge University Press. In 2007 Williams published J. S. Bach: A Life in Music. Williams's Bach: A Musical Biography was published posthumously in September 2016.

=== Gardiner ===
John Eliot Gardiner's Music in the castle of heaven was published in 2013.

=== Schulenberg ===
David Schulenberg's biography, Bach, was published in 2020.

== Partial biographies ==
Apart from the biographies that take the reader from Bach's birth in 1685 to his death in 1750, several studies highlight specific aspects of the composer's life.

== Filmed biography ==
Johann Sebastian Bach's life was the subject of several films.

Original title	English title	Date	Director	Actor playing Bach	Comments
The Chronicle of Anna Magdalena Bach	The Chronicle of Anna Magdalena Bach	1968	Jean-Marie Straub; Danièle Huillet	Gustav Leonhardt	Story told from the perspective of Anna Magdalena Bach; The New York Times: "While this 'Chronicle' ... is a testament to [Bach's] ever-living music, it is, unfortunately, lifeless as biography"
Johann Sebastian Bach		1985	Lothar Bellag	Ulrich Thein	East-German TV biopic in four parts. Klaus Eidam collaborated to the script.
Bach's Fight for Freedom	Bach's Fight for Freedom	1995	Stuart Gillard	Ted Dykstra	Bach's last year in Weimar (1717)
Mein Name ist Bach	My Name Is Bach	2003	Dominique de Rivaz	Vadim Glowna	Swiss film about Bach's 1747 visit to Potsdam, meeting Frederick the Great.
Sebastian (Bach - the animated series)	Sebastian (Bach - the animated series)	2018-2025	Fielding, Peter	Fielding, Peter	Italian series of cartoons about Bach's life.

== Biographies ==
- Denis Arnold. Bach. Oxford University Press, 1984. ISBN 019287554X
- Bach-Archiv Leipzig. Kalendarium zur Lebensgeschichte Johann Sebastian Bachs. 1970.
  - Revised edition by Andreas Glöckner. 2008. ISBN 9783899480948
- Carl Philipp Emanuel Bach and Johann Friedrich Agricola. "Nekrolog" (full title: "VI. Denkmal dreyer verstorbenen Mitglieder der Societät der musikalischen Wissenschafften; C. Der dritte und letzte ist der im Orgelspielen Weltberühmte HochEdle Herr Johann Sebastian Bach, Königlich-Pohlnischer und Churfürstlich Sächsicher Hofcompositeur, und Musikdirector in Leipzig"), pp. 158–176 in Lorenz Christoph Mizler's Musikalische Bibliothek, Volume IV No. 1. Leipzig, Mizlerischer Bücherverlag, 1754.
- Alberto Basso. Frau Musika: La vita e le opere di J. S. Bach. Turin, EDT:
  - Volume 1: Le origini familiari, l'ambiente luterano, gli anni giovanili, Weimar e Köthen (1685–1723). 1979. ISBN 88-7063-011-0
  - Volume 2: Lipsia e le opere de la maturità (1723–1750). 1983. ISBN 88-7063-028-5
- Batka, Richard [in German] (1892). J. S. Bach. Musiker-Biographien (in German). Vol. 15. Leipzig: Reclam.
- Karl Hermann Bitter. Johann Sebastian Bach. Berlin: Schneider, 1865. Vol. 1 – Vol. 2
  - Abridged translation by Janet Elizabeth Kay-Shuttleworth. London: Houlston. 1873.
  - Second revised and enlarged edition in 4 volumes. Berlin: Baensch, 1880. OCLC 318374312
    - 1881 print (Baensch). Vol. 1 – Vol. 2 – Vol. 3 – Vol. 4
    - 1978 DDR/Bärenreiter reprint in 2 volumes + facsimiles. OCLC 679929712, 680128546
- Walter Blankenburg, editor. Johann Sebastian Bach. Darmstadt: Wissenschaftliche Buchgesellschaft, 1970. OCLC 1060904
- Malcolm Boyd. Bach. London: J. M. Dent, 1983. ISBN 9780460044660
  - Oxford Press republication (2006)
- Piero Buscaroli. Bach. Milano: A. Mondadori, 1985. OCLC 13499133
- John Butt, editor. The Cambridge companion to Bach. Cambridge University Press, 1997. ISBN 9780521587808.
- Roland de Candé. Jean-Sébastien Bach. Paris: Seuil, 1984. ISBN 9782020085052
- A.-E. Cherbuliez. Johann Sebastian Bach: Sein Leben und sein Werk. Olten: Otto Walter, 1946.
- Hans Theodore David and Arthur Mendel, editors. The Bach Reader: A Life of Johann Sebastian Bach in Letters and Documents. New York: W. W. Norton, 1945. OCLC 219802687
  - Revised as The New Bach Reader: A Life of Johann Sebastian Bach in Letters and Documents by Christoph Wolff. 1998. ISBN 9780393045581
- Klaus Eidam. Das wahre Leben des Johann Sebastian Bach. Piper, 1999. ISBN 3492040799
  - Translated as The True Life of Johann Sebastian Bach. New York: Basic Books, 2001. ISBN 9780465018611
- Werner Felix. Johann Sebastian Bach. Leipzig: Deutscher Verlag für Musik, 1984. OCLC 750950924
  - English translation. London: Orbis; New York: W. W. Norton. 1985.
- Johann Nikolaus Forkel. Ueber Johann Sebastian Bachs Leben, Kunst und Kunstwerke: Für patriotische Verehrer echter musikalischer Kunst Leipzig: Hoffmeister und Kühnel. 1802.
  - English translation with notes and appendices by Charles Sanford Terry: Johann Sebastian Bach: His Life, Art, and Work. New York: Harcourt, Brace and Howe; London: Constable. 1920. (e-version at Gutenberg.org)
  - Edited by Max Friedrich Schneider (notes and appendices based on, among others, Terry's Bach biography): Über Joh. Seb. Bachs Leben, Kunst und Kunstwerke. Basel: Hardimann. 1946. OCLC 884470080, 600527458
- John Eliot Gardiner. Music in the castle of heaven. 2013.
  - UK: Music in the Castle of Heaven: A Portrait of Johann Sebastian Bach. Penguin UK. ISBN 9781846147210; London: Allen Lane. ISBN 9780713996623
  - US: Bach: Music in the Castle of Heaven. New York: Alfred A. Knopf. ISBN 9780385351980
- Martin Geck. Johann Sebastian Bach : mit Selbstzeugnissen und Bilddokumenten. Rowohlt, 1993. ISBN 9783499505119
  - Translation by Anthea Bell based on the 6th German edition (2000), with an introduction by John Butt: Bach. London: Haus Publishing. 2003. ISBN 9781904341161
- Martin Geck. Bach: Leben und Werk. Rowohlt, 2000. ISBN 9783498024833
  - Translated by John Hargraves. Johann Sebastian Bach: Life and Work. Houghton Mifflin Harcourt, 2006. ISBN 9780151006489
- Karl and Irene Geiringer. Johann Sebastian Bach: The Culmination of An Era. New York: Oxford University Press; London: George Allen & Unwin. 1966
- Wilibald Gurlitt. Johann Sebastian Bach: der Meister und sein Werk. Berlin: Furche, 1936. OCLC 612001760
  - English translation: Concordia, 1957. OCLC 742170817
    - Reprinted by Da Capo (1986). ISBN 9780306762628
  - Enlarged 5th edition: Deutscher Taschenbuch-Verlag, 1980. ISBN 9783761815342
- Maarten 't Hart. Johann Sebastian Bach. De Arbeiderspers, 2000. ISBN 9789029576840
- Carl L. Hilgenfeldt. Johann Sebastian Bach's Leben, Wirken und Werke: ein Beitrag zur Kunstgeschichte des achtzehnten Jahrhunderts. Leipzig: Friedrich Hofmeister, 1850
- Reginald Lane Poole. Sebastian Bach. London: Sampson Low, Marston, Searle, & Rivington, 1882.
  - In the early 20th century republished by Sampson Low, Marston & Co. as Johann Sebastian Bach, 1685-1750, with a foreword by Francesco Berger. OCLC 317890815, 5526964
  - Republished: Nabu Press, 2012. ISBN 978-1278440545
- Esther Meynell. The Little Chronicle of Magdalena Bach. London: Chatto & Windus; New York: Doubleday, Page & Co., 1925. OCLC 613081920
- Russell Hancock Miles. Johann Sebastian Bach: an Introduction to His Life and Works. Prentice-Hall, 1962
- Werner Neumann. Auf den Lebenswegen Johann Sebastian Bachs. Berlin: Verlag der Nation, 1953. OCLC 715957084
  - Fourth improved German edition (1962). OCLC 253348932
- Werner Neumann. Bach: Eine Bildbiographie. Berlin: Deutsche Buch-Gemeinschaft, 1960. OCLC 5116231
  - Revised edition. München: Kindler, 1961. OCLC 271067638
  - Translated by Stefan de Haan:
    - Bach: A Pictorial Biography. New York: Viking Press; London: Thames and Hudson. 1961.
    - Bach and his World. London: Thames and Hudson, 1961.
    - From 1969 revised editions (under both titles), e.g. Thames & Hudson, 1970
- Hubert Parry. Johann Sebastian Bach: The Story of the Development of a Great Personality. New York: G. P. Putnam's Sons; London: The Knickerbocker Press. 1909.
- André Pirro. J.-S. Bach. Paris: Félix Alcan, 1906. OCLC 842307554
  - Third edition (1910)
  - Revised edition (1949) OCLC 459516149
  - Translated by Mervyn Savil: J. S. Bach. New York: Orion Press, 1957. OCLC 16448996
- Edward Francis Rimbault. Johann Sebastian Bach: his life and writings. Adapted from the German of Hilgenfeldt and Forkel. With additions from original sources. London, Metzler & co., 1869.
- Joh. Carl Schauer. Joh. Seb. Bach's Lebensbild: Eine Denkschrift auf seinem 100 jährigen Todestag, den 28. Jul. 1850, aus Thüringen, seinem Vaterlande. Jena, F. Luden. 1850.
- Barbara Schwendowius and Wolfgang Dömling, editors. Johann Sebastian Bach: Zeit, Leben, Wirken. Bärenreiter, 1976. ISBN 9783761805466
  - Translated as Johann Sebastian Bach: Life, Times, Influence. Kassel: Bärenreiter, 1977. ISBN 9783761805893
- David Schulenberg. Bach. Oxford University Press. 2000.
- Albert Schweitzer. J. S. Bach, le musicien-poète. Preface by Charles Marie Widor. Leipzig: Breitkopf & Härtel. 1905.
  - Enlarged German edition: J. S. Bach. Leipzig: Breitkopf & Härtel. 1908.
  - English translation in two volumes by Ernest Newman (based on the 1908 German edition, with alterations and additions by Schweitzer): J. S. Bach. London: Breitkopf & Härtel. 1911. Volume 1 – Volume 2
    - Reissued in 1923 by A. & C. Black, reprinted 1935: Volume 1 – Volume 2
- Philipp Spitta. Johann Sebastian Bach.
  - Erster Band (Book I–IV). Leipzig: Breitkopf & Härtel. 1873.
    - Third print (1921) at Archive.org
  - Zweiter Band (Book V–VI). Leipzig: Breitkopf & Härtel. 1880.
    - Third print (1921) at Archive.org
  - Johann Sebastian Bach: His Work and Influence on the Music of Germany, 1685–1750 in three volumes. Translated by Clara Bell and J. A. Fuller Maitland. Novello & Co. 1884–1885.
    - 1899 edition: Vol. 1 (Book I–III) – Vol. 2 (Book IV–V) – Vol. 3 (Book VI) at Archive.org
    - 1992 republication of the 1952 Dover edition (with "Bibliographical Note" by Saul Novack): Vol. 1 (Book I–III)
- Charles Sanford Terry. Bach: A Biography. Oxford University Press, 1928. OCLC 912873095, 893564008, 902573683
  - Second and revised edition (1933) at HathiTrust
  - Many reprints, including Kessinger 2010 (ISBN 9781161377859) and Literary Licensing 2013 (ISBN 9781494101183)
- Peter Williams. The Life of Bach. Cambridge University Press, 2004. ISBN 9780521533744
- Peter Williams. J. S. Bach: A Life in Music. Cambridge University Press, 2007. ISBN 9781139461191
- Christoph Wolff. Bach: Essays on His Life and Music. Cambridge, Massachusetts: Harvard University Press, 1991. ISBN 9780674059269 (4th reprint, 1999)
- Christoph Wolff. Johann Sebastian Bach: The Learned Musician. Oxford University Press, 2000. ISBN 0-393-04825-X
