= David Heidenreich =

David Heidenreich may refer to:

- David Elias Heidenreich (1638–1688), German poet, dramatist, librettist and translator
- David Heidenreich (footballer) (born 2000), Czech footballer
