= Johann Sebastian Bach: His Life, Art, and Work =

1802 biography by Johann Nikolaus Forkel

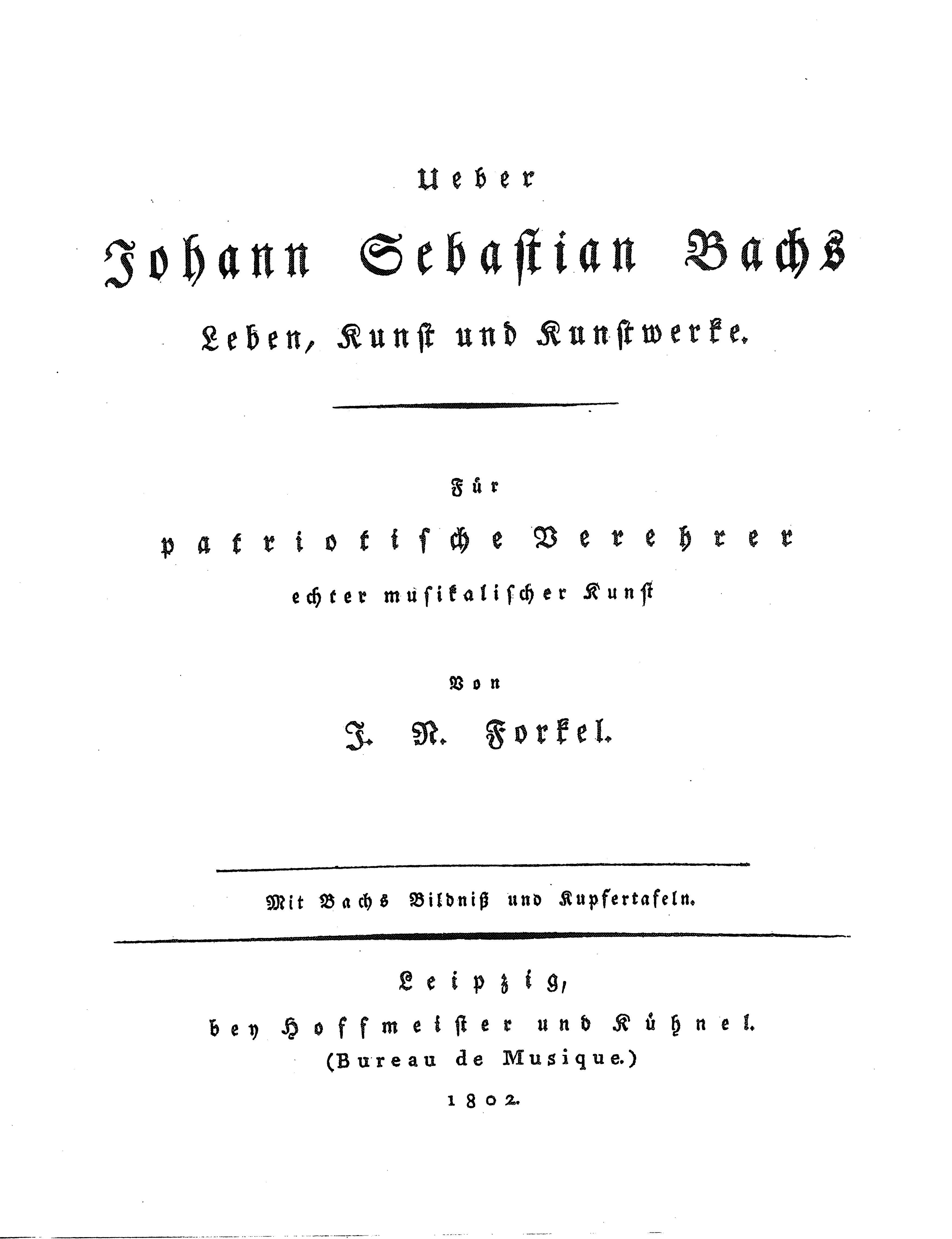
Title page of the first edition of Forkel's Ueber Johann Sebastian Bachs Leben, Kunst und Kunstwerke

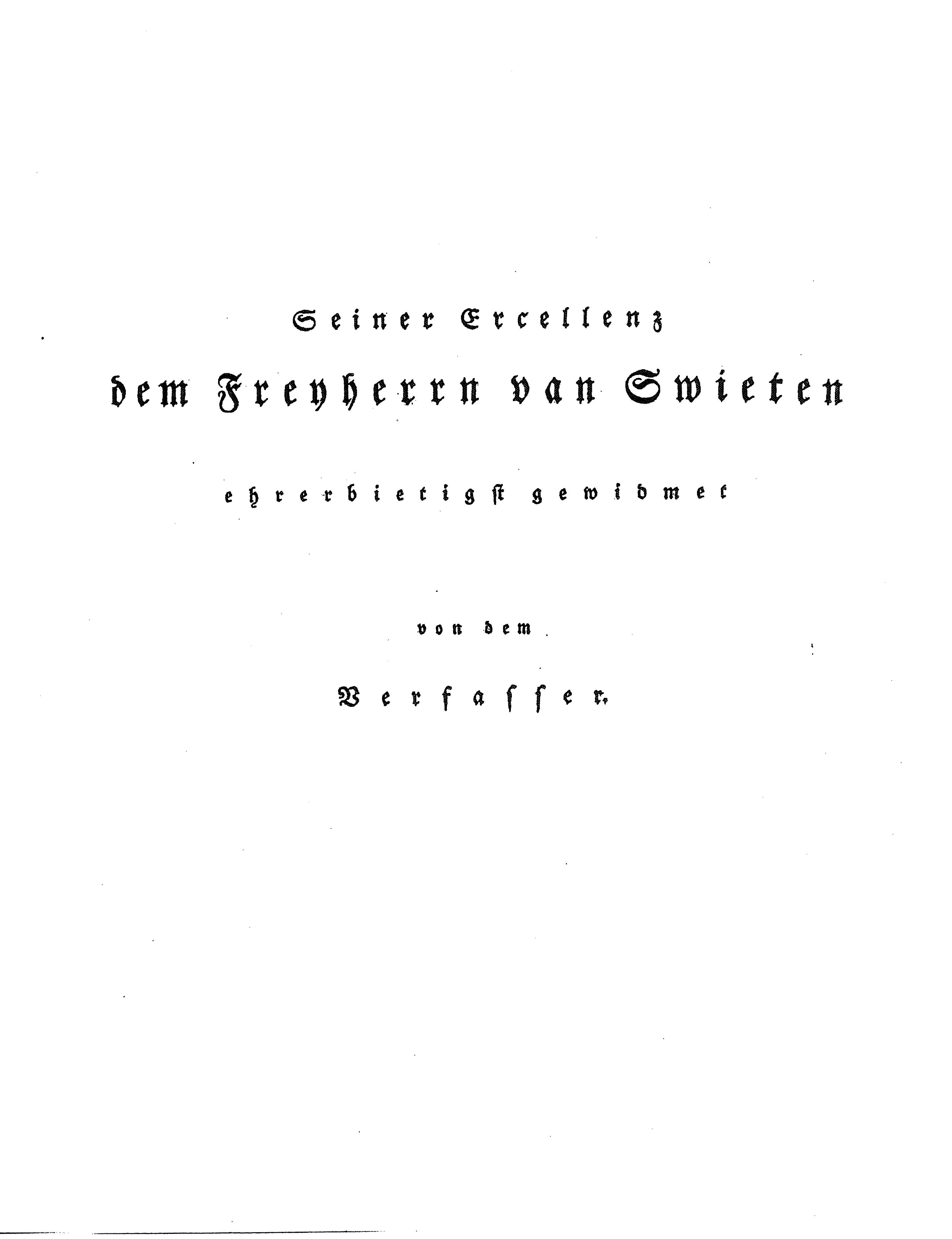
Dedication to Freiherr van Swieten

Johann Sebastian Bach: His Life, Art, and Work (Note: First published in German: Ueber Johann Sebastian Bachs Leben, Kunst und Kunstwerke: Für patriotische Verehrer echter musikalischer Kunst, lit. 'On Johann Sebastian Bach's Life, Art, and Artwork: For Patriotic Admirers of True Musical Art') is an early 19th-century biography of Johann Sebastian Bach, written in German by Johann Nikolaus Forkel, and later translated by, among others, Charles Sanford Terry. When Forkel published it in 1802, it was the first biography of the composer published as a separate book. Forkel dedicated the work to Gottfried van Swieten. Van Swieten was an early Bach adept, for instance making Mozart familiar with the baroque composer.

== Bach biography before Forkel ==
The best known predecessor of Forkel's biography was Bach's Obituary, the "Nekrolog", an article of less than 20 pages published a few years after the composer's death in 1750. Short biographies in reference works that appeared before Forkel's biography mostly derived from the "Nekrolog".

== Content ==
For the content of his biography, Forkel relied on the "Nekrolog", and on material he had obtained from Bach's sons Carl Philipp Emanuel and Wilhelm Friedemann. To that Forkel added his own interpretations and evaluations of Bach's art. Forkel saw his biography also as a vehicle for German nationalist feelings.

Forkel gives most attention to Bach's keyboard music. The biographical description of Bach's last tenure in Leipzig is almost entirely neglected, and no attention is given to the church music Bach wrote in the first two decades of that period.

== Editions and translations ==
The first edition of Forkel's biography on Johann Sebastian Bach was published by Hoffmeister and Kühnel. An early English translation of Forkel's work, published in 1820, had many deficiencies.

A second edition of Forkel's biography was issued by Peters in 1855. By the early 20th century, when Charles Sanford Terry produced his translation of the biography, scholarship on Bach had progressed, so Terry supplemented his translation with extensive footnotes, clarifications and appendices, and even expanded the text of some of the chapters.

In the second quarter of the 20th century new German editions with updated clarifications were produced. A new English translation was included in the New Bach Reader.

== Reception ==
Forkel's biography was instrumental in making Bach known to a broad public. Many inaccuracies were pointed out in Forkel's biography, but nonetheless later biographers relied on it.

== Sources ==
- Carl Philipp Emanuel Bach and Johann Friedrich Agricola. "Nekrolog" (full title: "VI. Denkmal dreyer verstorbenen Mitglieder der Societät der musikalischen Wissenschafften; C. Der dritte und letzte ist der im Orgelspielen Weltberühmte HochEdle Herr Johann Sebastian Bach, Königlich-Pohlnischer und Churfürstlich Sächsicher Hofcompositeur, und Musikdirector in Leipzig"), pp. 158–176 in Lorenz Christoph Mizler's Musikalische Bibliothek, Volume IV No. 1. Leipzig, Mizlerischer Bücherverlag, 1754.
- Johann Nikolaus Forkel. Ueber Johann Sebastian Bachs Leben, Kunst und Kunstwerke: Für patriotische Verehrer echter musikalischer Kunst. Leipzig: Hoffmeister und Kühnel. 1802.
  - First published translation: Life of John Sebastian Bach: with a Critical View of his Compositions. By J. N. Forkel, Author of The Complete History of Music, etc., etc. Translated from the German. London: Printed for T. Boosey and Co., Holles-Street, Cavendish-Square. 1820. OCLC 6676153
  - Second German edition: Leipzig: C. F. Peters, 1855. (at HathiTrust)
  - English translation with notes and appendices by Charles Sanford Terry: Johann Sebastian Bach: His Life, Art, and Work New York: Harcourt, Brace and Howe; London: Constable. 1920. (e-version at Gutenberg.org)
  - Edited by Josef M. Müller-Blattau (introduction, extensive epilogue): Bärenreiter, 1925. OCLC 867532087
  - Edited by Max Friedrich Schneider (notes and appendices based on, among others, Terry's Bach biography): Über Joh. Seb. Bachs Leben, Kunst und Kunstwerke. Basel: Hardimann. 1946. OCLC 884470080, 600527458
  - Translated as "On Johann Sebastian Bach's Life, Genius, and Works" in The New Bach Reader: A Life of Johann Sebastian Bach in Letters and Documents, edited by Hans T. David, Arthur Mendel and Christoph Wolff. W. W. Norton, 1999. ISBN 9780393319569
- Michael Kassler, "The English Translations of Forkel's Life of Bach", in Michael Kassler (ed.), "The English Bach Awakening: Knowledge of J. S. Bach and his Music in England 1750-1830", Aldershot, Ashgate, 2004, pp. 169-209.
