= Denn du wirst meine Seele nicht in der Hölle lassen =

Church cantata by Johann Ludwig Bach II

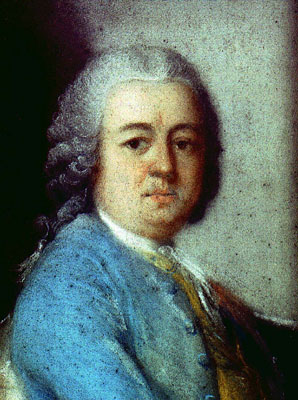
Johann Ludwig Bach

Denn du wirst meine Seele nicht in der Hölle lassen (For you shall not leave my soul in hell), JLB 21, BWV 15, is a church cantata spuriously attributed to Johann Sebastian Bach but most likely composed by Johann Ludwig Bach.

== History and text ==
The piece was initially thought to be an early work of Johann Sebastian Bach. However, Bach scholars reattributed the piece to his cousin, Johann Ludwig Bach. The piece was likely composed in Meiningen in 1704 for the first day of Eastertide, known as Easter Sunday. There is some evidence that it may have been performed again under the aegis of Johann Sebastian Bach on 21 April 1726 in Leipzig. The prescribed readings for the day are 1 Corinthians 5:6–8 and Mark 16:1–8.

=== Libretto ===
It has been proposed that the text may have been authored by Christoph Helm (as suggested by W. Blankenburg) or by Herzog Ernst Ludwig von Sachsen-Meinigen (as suggested by K. Kuester, a suggestion that gets more traction in recent scholarship).

== Scoring and structure ==
The piece is scored for three natural trumpets, timpani, violins, violas, basso continuo, four vocal soloists (soprano, altus, tenor, and bassus) and four-part choir.

It is in two parts, totalling ten movements:

Part one

1. Arioso: "Denn du wirst meine Seele nicht in der Hölle lassen" for bass.
2. Recitative: "Mein Jesus ware tot" for soprano.
3. Aria (Duetto): "Weichet, weichet, Furcht und Schrecken" for soprano and alto.
4. Aria: "Entsetzet euch nicht" for tenor.
5. Aria: "Auf, freue dich, Seele, du bist nun getröst'" for soprano.

Part two

6. Terzetto: "Wo bleibet dein Rasen du höllischer Hund" for altus, tenor & bass.
7. Aria (Duet): "Ihr klaget mit Seufzen, ich jauchze mit Schall" for soprano & alto.
8. Sonata for instrumental tutti.
9. Recitative for tenor & bass – Quartet: "Drum danket dem Höchsten, dem Störer des Krieges".
10. Chorale: "Weil du vom Tod erstanden bist" for choral and instrumental tutti.

== Recordings ==
- Alsfelder Vokalensemble and I Febiarmionici. The Apocryphal Bach Cantatas II. Radio Bremen, 2001.
- Children's Choir of the Royal Danish Academy of Music. I'm laughing and shouting for joy from Cantata BWV 15. Point Records, 1994.
- NDR Chor and NDR Sinfonieorchester. Cantata BWV 15. Tonträger, 1956.
