= David Pohle =

German composer

- Born: 1624; German
- Died: 20 December 1695 (aged 70–71)
- Occupation: Composer

David Pohle (1624 – 20 December 1695) was a German composer of the Baroque era. His surname is also spelled Pohl, Pohlen, Pole, Pol or Bohle.

== Biography ==
Pohle was born in Marienberg into a family of civic musicians. He was a pupil of Heinrich Schütz in Dresden. He and his brother Samuel joined the Kapelle of Christian I, Duke of Saxe-Merseburg as instrumentalists. From 1650 to 1652 his presence at Kassel is documented. From 1653 he was at the Holstein-Gottorp court in Schleswig.

In a baptismal record of 1660 he is named as "Concertmeister to the prince of Magdeburg", namely Augustus, Duke of Saxe-Weissenfels. Pohle became the Kapellmeister for the Duke's court at Halle that same year, succeeding Philipp Stolle. The poet and dramatist David Elias Heidenreich worked in the Saxon courts as an official, and provided the libretti for a number of the Singspiel operas that Pohle composed. Christian Ritter was also at Halle, as organist, for some years up to 1677, when Ritter was succeeded in the post of Kammerorganist by Johann Philipp Krieger. From 1674 to 1677 Pohle also worked at the secundogeniture courts at Saxe-Weissenfels and Saxe-Zeitz.

When the court at Halle moved to Weissenfels in 1680, Krieger, who had already become deputy Kapellmeister at the court, replaced Pohle as Kapellmeister. From 1678 to 1682 Pohle held the post of Kapellmeister at Zeitz, a role he shared with Heinrich Gottfried Kühnel. Violinist Christian Heinrich Aschenbrenner was also at Zeitz during that time. When the Zeitz Kapelle was disbanded, in 1682, Pohle became Kapellmeister for the secundogeniture court at Saxe-Merseburg. He was accompanied there by Aschenbrenner. Pohle remained at Merseburg till he died in 1695.

His earliest surviving compositions are Lieder in strophic form, settings of odes by Paul Fleming. He dedicated these in 1650 to William VI, Landgrave of Hesse-Kassel. Between 1663 and 1664 he wrote a cycle of cantatas for the church year. In each one of these, in addition to biblical verse there is a strophic aria, for which Pohle set odes by David Elias Heidenreich. Only one work from this cycle survives, Siehe, es hat überwunden der Löwe.

In his sacred vocal works the influence of Heinrich Schütz is noticeable. Pohle's vocal works provide a link between Heinrich Schütz and Johann Sebastian Bach in the development of the Protestant cantata. His preference for middle and lower voices, and above all his experimentation with form in his instrumental music, create a distinctive style which reveals itself despite the limited scope of his works.

None of Pohle's works were published during his lifetime. Only manuscripts survived, and much was lost. However, recent years have seen some of his works published.

== Works ==
=== Opera ===
==== Singspiel ====
(all lost; libretti mostly by David Elias Heidenreich)

- Liebe krönt Eintracht (1669)
- Der singende Hof-Mann Daniel (1671)
- Der glückselige Liebes-Fehl Prinz Walrams aus Sachsen (1673)
- Der verliebte Mörder Herodes (1673)
- Aspasia (1672)
- Das ungereimte Paar Venus und Vulcanus (1679)

=== Vocal ===
==== Sacred Latin ====
- Amo te Deus for 3 voices, 3 instruments and continuo
- Benedicam Dominum for 2 voices, 3 instruments and continuo
- Benedicam Dominum (other version) for 2 voices, 3 instruments and continuo
- Bonum est confiteri for 3 voices and continuo
- Diligam te Domine for soprano, 2 instruments and continuo
- Domine, ostende mihi for 5 voices, 6 instruments and continuo
- Domine, quis habitat for 4 voices, 5 instruments and continuo
- In te Domine speravi for 3 voices, 3 instruments and continuo
- Jesu chare for alto, 2 instruments and continuo
- Jesus auctor clementiae for 3 voices, 3 instruments and continuo
- Miserere mei Deus for 5 voices, 5 instruments ad lib. and continuo
- Nascitur Immanuel for 5 voices, 5 instruments and continuo
- Oculi mei for 3 voices, 2 instruments and continuo
- Paratum cor meum for tenor, 2 instruments and continuo
- Te sanctum Dominum for 5 voices, 7 instruments and continuo
- Tulerunt Dominum for 6 voices, 6 instruments and continuo
- Vox Domini for bass, 2 instruments and continuo

In the 21st century Pohle was suggested as one of three possible composers of the Kyrie–Gloria Mass for double choir, BWV Anh. 167.

==== Sacred German ====
- Der Engel des Herrn for 4 voices, 4 instruments and continuo
- Es wird ein Stern aus Jacob aufgehen for 4 voices, 3 instruments and continuo
- Herr, wenn ich nur dich habe for alto, 5 instruments and continuo
- Herr, wenn ich nur dich habe (other version) for 3 voices, 3 instruments and continuo
- Ihr Völker bringet her for 3 voices, 3 instruments and continuo
- Jesu, meine Freude for 4 voices, 3 instruments and continuo
- Nur in meines Jesu Wunden for 6 voices, 6 instruments and continuo
- Siehe, es hat überwunden der Löwe for 5 voices, 7 (8 ad lib.) instruments and continuo
- Wie der Hirsch schreiet for tenor, 3 instruments and continuo

==== Secular German ====
- 12 arias after the fifth book of odes by Paul Fleming, for 2 voices, 2 instruments and continuo
- Kein Augenblick vergeht for 3 voices and continuo
- Marindgen, du siehst hold und schöne for 2 voices, 5 instruments and continuo
- Weiss und Schwarz for 2 voices, 2 instruments and continuo

=== Instrumental ===
- 20 sonatas for 5 to 8 instruments
- Sonata a 3
- Sonata a 4
- 2 sonatas a 4
- Sonata a 5
- 3 sonatas a 6
- Sonata a 8
- 2 suites a 4
- Le Testament du Sr. Belleville et Courante et Sarabande
- Ballet
- Sonata a 2 Violini (lost, mentioned in Codex Rost, No. 24)

== Recordings ==
- Wie der Hirsch schreyet: Diligam te Domine; In te Domine speravi; Benedicam Dominum; Jesu chare; Paratum cor meum. Sonatas a 6 No.23–25, 29; Sonatas a 6 in F. Monika Mauch, David Erler, Hansjörg Mammel, L'arpa festante, Rien Voskuilen, Carus, DDD, 2004
- Complete Sonatas & Ballet Music. Brice Sailly, Stéphanie de Failly, Ensemble Clematis, Ricercar RIC 460, 2024

== Sources ==
- Baron, John H. "Stolle, Philipp". Grove Music Online. Oxford University Press.(subscription required)
- Baselt, Bernd (1993). "Brandenburg-Prussia and the Central German Courts". In Buelow, George J (ed.). The Late Baroque Era. Basingstoke, Hampshire: Macmillan. pp. 230–253. ISBN 0-333-51603-6.
- Bergunder, Karl-Ernst. "Aschenbrenner, Christian Heinrich". Grove Music Online. Oxford University Press.(subscription required)
- Snyder, Kerala J. "Pohle, David". Grove Music Online. Oxford University Press.(subscription required)
- Wollny, Peter (2015). "Vom „apparat der auserleßensten kirchen Stücke" zum „Vorrath an Musicalien, von J. S. Bach und andern berühmten Musicis": Quellenkundliche Ermittlungen zur frühen Thüringer Bach-Überlieferung und zu einigen Weimarer Schülern und Kollegen Bachs". Bach-Jahrbuch 2015 [Bach Yearbook 2015]. Bach-Jahrbuch (in German). Vol. 101. Neue Bachgesellschaft. Leipzig: Evangelische Verlagsanstalt. ISBN 978-3-374-04320-0. ISSN 0084-7682.
