= Christoph Bernhard =

German Baroque composer and musician

- Born: 1 January 1628; Kolberg, Pomerania, Germany
- Died: 14 November 1692 (aged 64); Dresden, Germany
- Era: Baroque

Christoph Bernhard (German pronunciation: [ˈkʁɪstɔf ˈbɛʁnhaʁt]; 1 January 1628 – 14 November 1692) was born in Kolberg, Pomerania, and died in Dresden. He was a German Baroque composer and musician. He studied with former Sweelinck-pupil Paul Siefert in Danzig (now Gdańsk) and in Warsaw. By the age of 20, he was singing at the electoral court in Dresden under Heinrich Schütz and composed some of the music for the Master's funeral. He then spent a year in Copenhagen to study singing with Agostino Fontana.

After his appointment as assistant kapellmeister in Dresden in 1655, Bernhard made two sojourns to Italy to further his musical education. When he was 35, he moved to Hamburg to work as the director of music for the Johanneum and for civic musical events. The next ten years were a golden age in the musical tradition of Hamburg: Bernhard and his good friend Matthias Weckmann performed together and directed the latest compositions from Italy and Vienna, as well as composing an important collection of music in finely-wrought counterpoint.

The Elector of Saxony recalled Bernhard to Dresden in 1674, where he returned as assistant kapellmeister. Six years later, the large - and primarily Italian - musical establishment in the city was greatly reduced, until Bernhard remained the only kapellmeister at court. He continued composing, directing and caring for the music library in Dresden until his death in 1692, at the age of 64. Bernhard left behind many sacred vocal works, a few secular compositions, and three important treatises on music, the most famous of which is the Tractatus compositionis augmentatus (ca. 1657), which was the source of the term passus duriusculus.

In the 21st century Bernhard was suggested as one of three possible composers of the Kyrie–Gloria Mass for double choir, BWV Anh. 167.

== Sources ==
- Wohl dem, der den Herren fürchtet [Blessed is the man who fears the Lord], by Christoph Bernhard (Garri Editions, Frankfurt am Main, 2005) Dr. Alejandro Garri, Ed.
- Wollny, Peter (2015). "Vom „apparat der auserleßensten kirchen Stücke" zum „Vorrath an Musicalien, von J. S. Bach und andern berühmten Musicis": Quellenkundliche Ermittlungen zur frühen Thüringer Bach-Überlieferung und zu einigen Weimarer Schülern und Kollegen Bachs". Bach-Jahrbuch 2015 [Bach Yearbook 2015]. Bach-Jahrbuch (in German). Vol. 101. Neue Bachgesellschaft. Leipzig: Evangelische Verlagsanstalt. ISBN 978-3-374-04320-0. ISSN 0084-7682.
