= David Elias Heidenreich =

German poet, dramatist and librettist

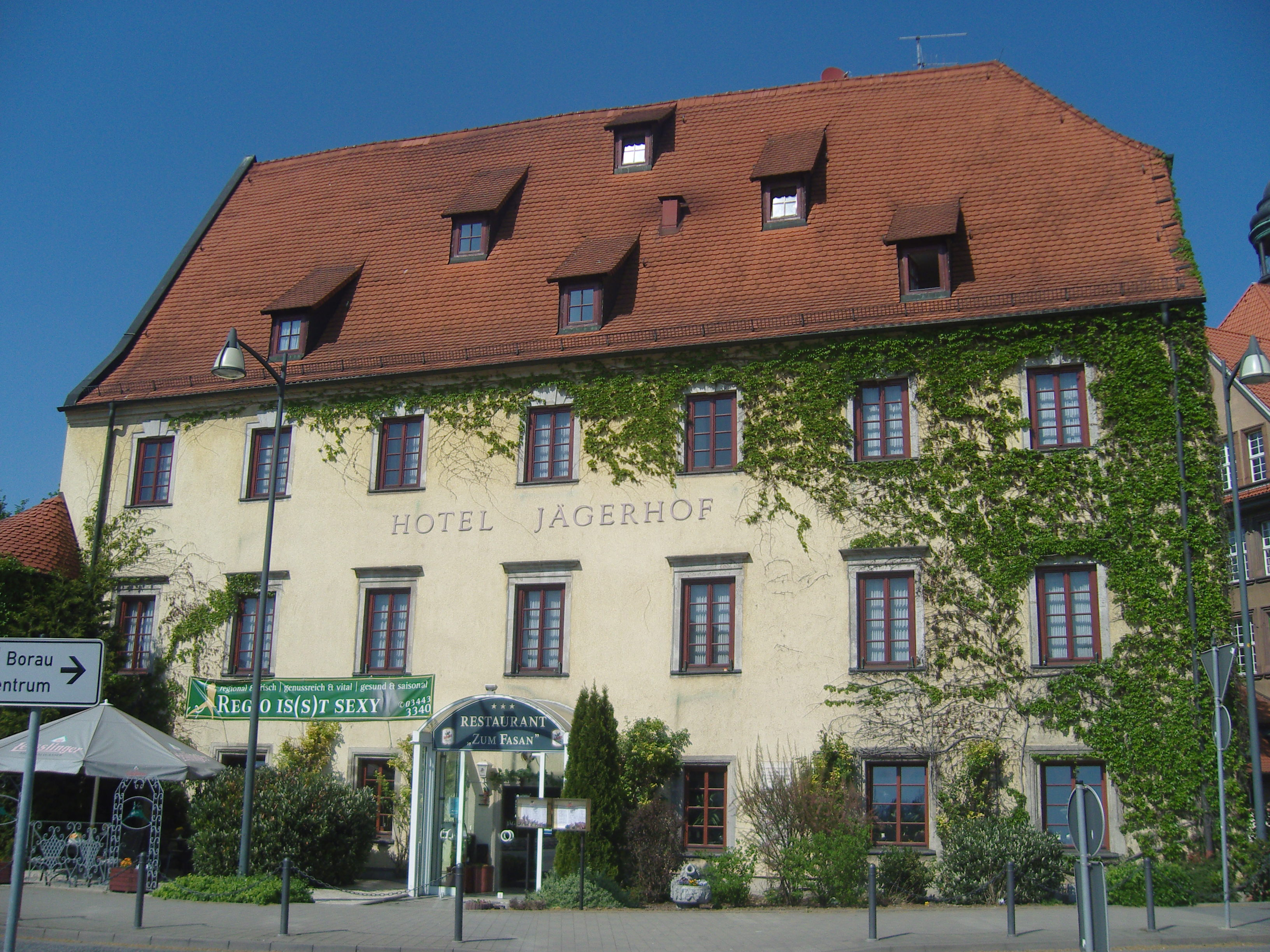
Heidenreich's house in Weißenfels

David Elias Heidenreich (21 January 1638 – 6 June 1688) was a German poet, dramatist, librettist and translator of the Baroque era.

== Biography ==
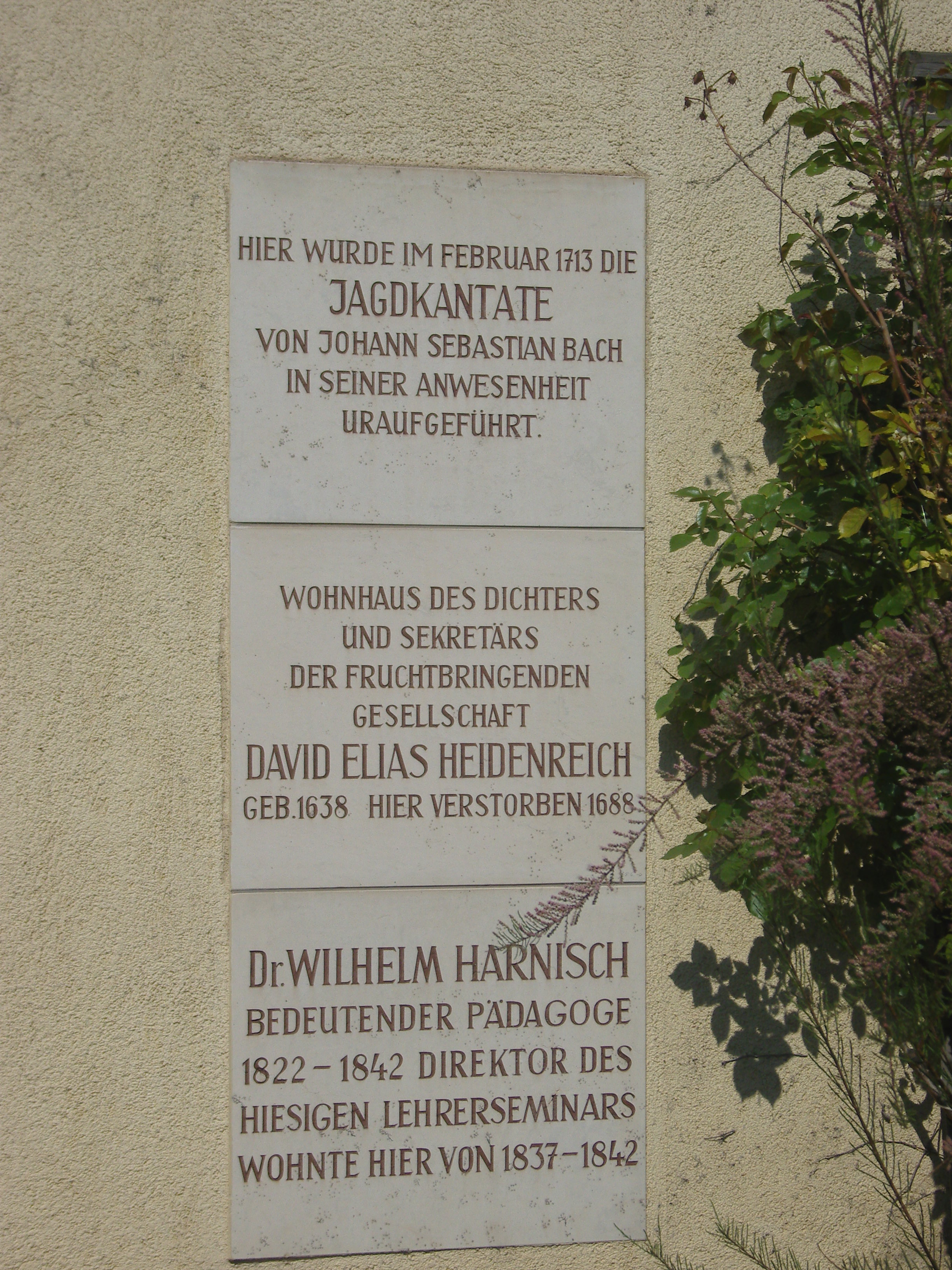
Memorial plaques on the house

Born in Leipzig, he was the son of the prominent lawyer Tobias Heidenreich and his wife, who was a daughter of the famous poet and printer Gregor Ritzsch. Although Heidenreich followed his father into a legal career, his poetic talent soon revealed itself. After his father's death, he spent 13 years in Dresden in the home of Bürgermeister (mayor) and poet Christian Brehme.

Later he attended the Gymnasium in Halle. In 1655 he registered as a student at the faculty of law in Wittenberg, where he earned a living through translation work and occasional poetry. After completing his studies he went to work at the court in Weißenfels, where he made a career in the court and consistory administrations, and where his numerous theatrical works were premiered.

The composer David Pohle, a pupil of Heinrich Schütz, was Kapellmeister at the Saxon courts of Halle and Weißenfels. Heidenreich provided him with the libretti for a number of the Singspiel operas that he composed. Heidenreich's 1665 Geistliche Oden (Sacred Odes) were also set to music by Pohle.

In 1672 Heidenreich became a member of the Fruitbearing Society, under the name der Willige ("the Willing"). He died in Weißenfels in 1688.

== Works ==
Selected works include:

- Horatz oder Gerechtfertigter Schwester-Mord, translation after Pierre Corneille (1662, Leipzig)
- Rache zu Gibeon, translation after Joost van den Vondel (1662, Leipzig)
- Geistliche Oden auf die fürnehmsten Feste und alle Sonntage des gantzen Jahres (1665, Halle)
- Heyrath macht Friede, oder Der erkannte Tuisco. Trauer-Freuden-Spiel (1669, Halle)
- Der verliebte Mörder Herodes, der Große (1673, Halle)

== Sources ==
- Snyder, Kerala J. "Pohle, David". Grove Music Online. Oxford University Press.
