= Alberto Basso =

Italian musicologist and librarian (born 1931)

Alberto Basso (born Turin, 21 August 1931) is an Italian musicologist and librarian.

He started his activity in 1952 with a monograph on Stravinsky. In 1956 he graduated in law at the University of Turin but his activity was then fully devoted to music. From 1961 to 1974 he taught history of music at the Conservatory of Turin, where he was also librarian from 1974 to 1993. From 1973 to 1979 and from 1994 to 1997 he was president of the Italian Society of Musicology. In 1986 Basso founded the Istituto per i Beni Musicali in Piemonte (Institute for Musical Heritage of Piedmont). In 1982 he became a member of the Accademia Nazionale di Santa Cecilia. Basso is also a member of Accademia Filarmonica Romana (from 1986), Accademia Filarmonica di Bologna (from 1996) and honorary member of the Reial Acadèmia Catalana de Belles Arts de Sant Jordi (from 2000). In 2004 he received an honorary degree from the Autonomous University of Barcelona. In 1984 Basso was appointed knight of the Order of Merit of the Italian Republic.

From 1961 Basso has worked in the musicology section of the Turin publishing company UTET. For UTET he edited many important collective publications: La Musica (1966–1971), Storia dell'opera (1977), Dizionario Enciclopedico Universale della Musica e dei Musicisti (DEUMM, 1983–2005), Musica in scena. Storia dello spettacolo musicale (1995–1996).

For the French music publishing company Opus 111 Basso created the series Tesori del Piemonte (Treasures of Piedmont, started in 1985), which includes the Vivaldi Edition, a complete edition of all the compositions by Antonio Vivaldi (about 450) owned by the Turin National University Library.

== Works ==
- Il corale organistico di J.S. Bach, in L'Approdo Musicale, Anno IV nn. 14-15, 1961
- Il Conservatorio di Musica «G. Verdi» di Torino. Storia e documenti dalle origini al 1970, Turin, UTET, 1971
- L'età di Bach e di Händel, volume V of Storia della musica, Società Italiana di Musicologia, Turin, EDT, 1976
- Il Teatro della Città dal 1788 al 1936, volume II of Storia del Teatro Regio di Torino, Turin, Cassa di Risparmio di Torino, 1976
- Frau Musika. La vita e le opere di J. S. Bach, 2 Volumes, Turin, EDT (volume I: 1979; volume II: 1983)
- Sui sentieri della musica. Appunti per una rassegna iconografica, with Luciano Berio and Alberto Conforti, Milan, IdeaLibri, 1985
- J. S. Bach. Tracce di una vita profonda, Turin, Lioness Club, 1985
- L'invenzione della gioia. Musica e massoneria nell'età dei Lumi, Milan, Garzanti, 1994
- Storia della musica (dalle origini al XIX secolo), 3 Volumes, Turin, UTET, 2004–05 (in the fourth section of DEUMM)
- I Mozart in Italia, Rome, Accademia Nazionale di Santa Cecilia, 2006

Basso was also editor of the following publications:

- La Musica: Enciclopedia storica (4 Volumes, 1966) and Dizionario (2 Volumes, 1971), Turin, UTET
- Storia del Teatro Regio di Torino, 6 Volumes, Turin, Cassa di Risparmio di Torino, 1976–1991
- Storia dell'opera, 3 Volumes, Turin, UTET, 1977
- Dizionario Enciclopedico Universale della Musica e dei Musicisti (DEUMM), 22 Volumes in four sections, Turin, UTET, 1983–2005
- L'arcano incanto. Il Teatro Regio di Torino, 1740–1990 (catalogue of the homonymous exhibition), Milan, Electa, 1991
- Compact Enciclopedia della musica, Novara, De Agostini, 1995
- Musica in scena. Storia dello spettacolo musicale, 6 Volumes, Turin, UTET, 1995–1996

== Sources ==
- "Basso, Alberto". DEUMM. Le Biografie (in Italian). Vol. 1. Turin: UTET. 1985. pp. 348–349. Update: Appendice 2005, p. 33, 2004.
- Moffa, Rosy; Saccomani, Sabrina, eds. (2007). Musica se extendit ad omnia. Studi in onore di Alberto Basso in occasione del suo 75º compleanno (2 Volumes). Lucca: LIM. ISBN 978-88-7096-456-1.
- Gianturco, Carolyn; Gialdroni, Teresa M. (2001). "Basso, Alberto". The New Grove Dictionary of Music and Musicians.
