= Arthur Mendel =

American musicologist (1905–1979)

Arthur Mendel (June 6, 1905 – October 14, 1979) was an American musicologist. His editions and studies of Johann Sebastian Bach's life and works, and his editions of Bach's St. John Passion (1951, 1974), brought him recognition as the foremost American Bach scholar of his day.

== Education ==
Born in Boston, he graduated from Harvard University in 1925 before going to study with Nadia Boulanger in Paris.

== Career ==
Mendel was an editor at G. Schirmer, Inc. (1930-1938), the journal of the American Musicological Society (1940-1943) and Associated Music Publishers (1941-1943). He also conducted the Cantata Singers in New York and taught at the Dalcroze School of Music and the Diller-Quaile School.

For 31 years, Mendel taught at Princeton University. He was chaired the music department from 1952 to 1967, and subsequently held the Henry Putnam University Professorship from 1969 until he retired in 1973.

He died of leukemia in Newark, New Jersey in 1979.

== Literary works ==
- music critic at The Nation (1930–1933)
- editor of "The Bach Reader", 1945 (with H. T. David)
- Studies in the History of Musical Pitch, 1968
- With Nathan Broder, translator of Mozart: His Character, His Work by Alfred Einstein
- Translator of 'Mozart's Choice of Keys' by Alfred Einstein
