= Johann Nikolaus Forkel =

German musicologist (1749–1818)

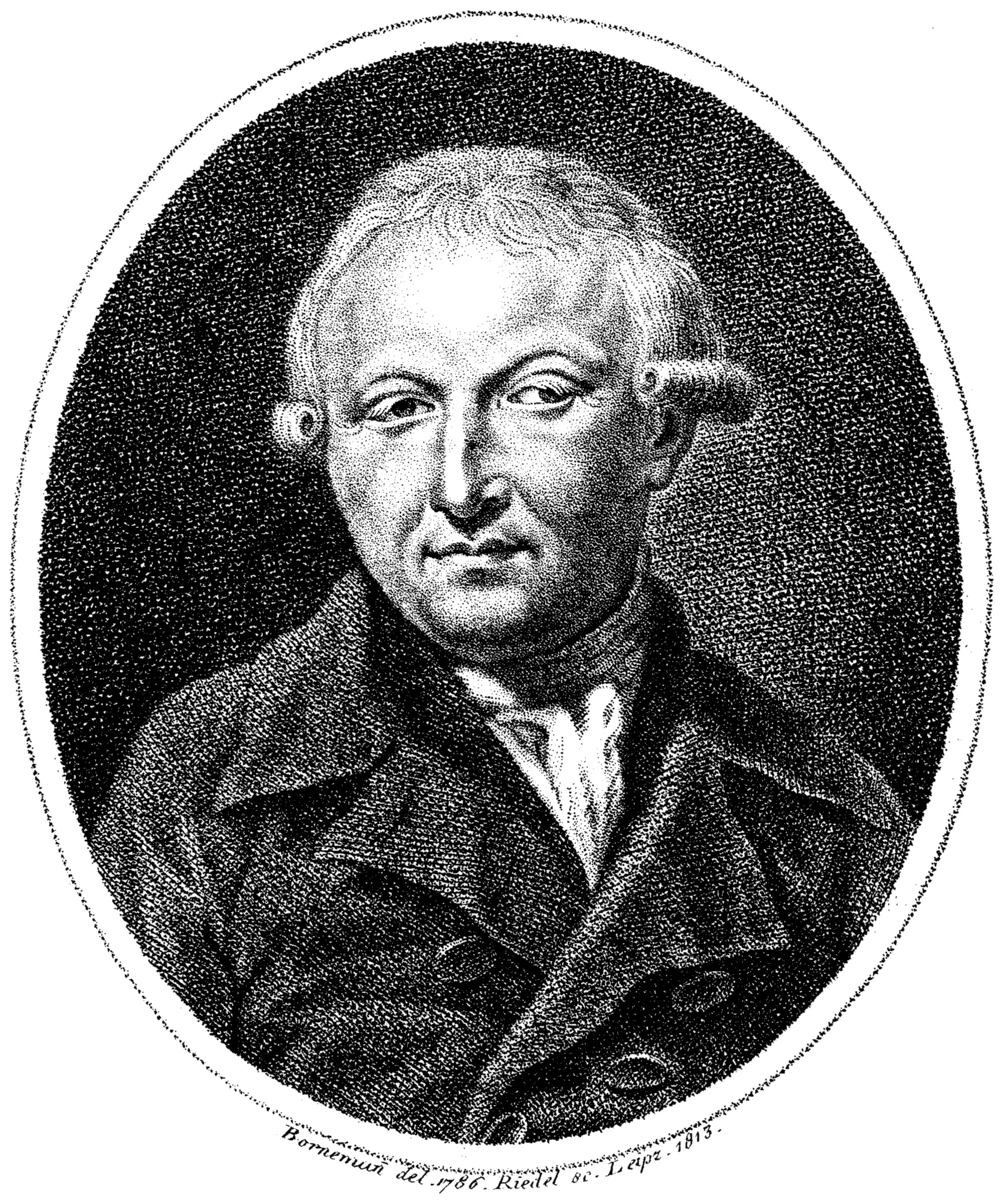
- Forkel in a 1813 engraving by Carl Traugott Riedel
- Born: Johann Nikolaus Forkel; 22 February 1749
- Died: 20 March 1818 (aged 69)

Johann Nikolaus Forkel (22 February 1749 – 20 March 1818) was a German musicologist and music theorist, generally regarded as among the founders of modern musicology. His publications include the two-volume Allgemeine Geschichte der Musik (General History of Music), among the first attempts at a history of Western music and the "ground-breaking music bibliography" Allgemeine Litteratur der Musik. (Note: Forkel's original intention to cover a global history of music (in both the history and bibliography) was unrealizd. The musicologist Vanessa Agnew explains that "the best we are left with are references to non-Western music in Forkel's music bibliography and some stray comments in the universal history.") He also authored Johann Sebastian Bach: His Life, Art, and Work, the first substantial survey on the life and works of Johann Sebastian Bach.

== Biography ==
He was born at Meeder in Coburg in the Holy Roman Empire on 22 February 1749. He was the son of a cobbler, and received early musical training, especially in keyboard playing, from Johann Heinrich Schulthesius, who was the local Kantor. In other aspects of his music education he was self-taught, especially in regards to theory. As a teenager he served as a singer in Lüneburg, and studied law for two years at the University of Göttingen; he remained associated with the university for more than fifty years, where he held varied positions, including instructor of music theory, organist, keyboard teacher, and eventually director of all music at the university. In 1787 he received an honorary doctorate of philosophy from the institution.

Forkel is often regarded as the founder of Historical Musicology, for it is with him that the study of music history and theory became an academic discipline with rigorous standards of scholarship.

He was an enthusiastic admirer of Johann Sebastian Bach, whose music he did much to popularize. He also wrote the first biography of Bach (in 1802), one which is of particular value today, as he was still able to correspond directly with Bach's sons Carl Philipp Emanuel Bach and Wilhelm Friedemann Bach, and thereby obtained much valuable information that would otherwise have been lost.

His library, which was accumulated with care and discrimination at a time when rare books were cheap, forms a valuable portion of the Berlin State Library and also of the library of the Königliche Institut für Kirchenmusik.

He died at Göttingen.

== Selected works ==
Forkel's writings include:

- Über die Theorie der Musik (Göttingen, 1777)
- Musikalisch kritische Bibliothek (Gotha, 1778)
- Allgemeine Geschichte der Musik (Leipzig, 1788, 1801)
- Allgemeine Litteratur der Musik: oder, Anleitung zur Kenntniss musikalischer Bücher, welche von den ältesten bis auf die neusten Zeiten bey den Griechen, Römern und den meisten neuern europäischen Nationen sind geschrieben worden; systematisch geordnet, und nach Veranlassung mit Anmerkungen und Urtheilen begleitet (Leipzig 1792), known in English as Dictionary of Musical Literature
- Ueber Johann Sebastian Bachs Leben, Kunst und Kunstwerke. Für patriotische Verehrer echter musikalischer Kunst (Leipzig, 1802)

To his musical compositions, which are numerous, little interest is to be attached today. However, he wrote variations on "God Save the King" for the clavichord, and that Georg Joseph Vogler wrote a sharp criticism on them, which appeared at Frankfurt in 1793 together with a set of variations as he conceived they ought to be written.
