= Charles Sanford Terry (historian) =

English musicologist (1864–1936)

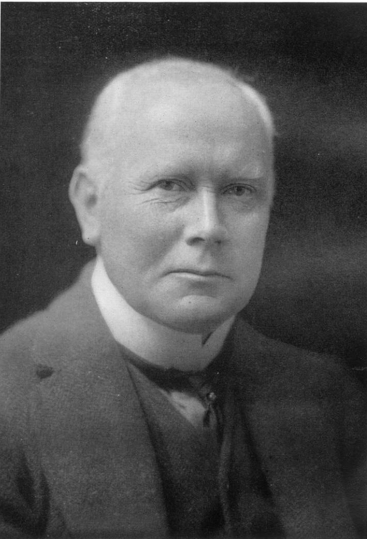
Charles Sanford Terry

Charles Sanford Terry (24 October 1864, in Newport Pagnell – 5 November 1936, in Aberdeen) was an English historian and musicologist who published extensively on Scottish and European history as well as the life and works of J. S. Bach.

== Career ==
A man who has not got a hobby to jostle with his profession is a man to be pitied, and I take off my hat to St. Paul's for the many years of happiness in a pursuit of which my school-days there laid the foundation.

— Charles Sanford Terry

Terry was the eldest son of Charles Terry, a physician, and Ellen Octavia Prichard. After attending St Paul's Cathedral School, King's College School, and Lancing College, he was an undergraduate at Clare College, Cambridge, where he obtained a B.A. in history (2nd class) in 1886 and an M.A. in 1891. He held lectureships in history at Durham College of Science (now part of the University of Newcastle-upon-Tyne), the University of Aberdeen and the University of Cambridge. In 1901 he married Edith Mary Allfrey of Newport Pagnell, daughter of Francis Allfrey, a brewer; the marriage was childless. He was appointed Burnett-Fletcher Professor of History and Archaeology at the University of Aberdeen from 1903 until his retirement in 1930. He served as president of the Association of Scottish History. Terry was also known as a composer and amateur musician. In 1898 he became conductor of the Aberdeen University Choral and Orchestral Society, with roughly 150 singers and 70 instrumentalists; and in 1909 he founded the Aberdeen and North East of Scotland Music Festival.

Terry had a close professional and personal association with Edward Elgar, both being involved in the Three Choirs Festival in the cathedrals of Hereford, Gloucester and Worcester. Terry arranged for Elgar to receive an honorary doctorate from the University of Aberdeen in 1906 and four years later helped with the proofreading of the original manuscript of the violin concerto, which Elgar later bequeathed to him. Terry later gifted this volume to his colleague at the University of Aberdeen Sir John Marnoch

== Works ==
Terry published extensively on several aspects of Scottish history, and wrote a Short History of Europe (1806–1915). He published many books on the life and works of J. S. Bach between 1915 and 1932 and became known as an authority on Bach; his works have become classics in Bach scholarship.

== Honours ==
- Honorary Doctor of Music, University of Oxford, University of Edinburgh
- Doctor of Laws, University of Durham, University of Glasgow and University of Aberdeen
- Honorary Ph.D., University of Leipzig, 1935, to mark the 250th anniversary of the birth of J. S. Bach
- Honorary fellow of Clare College, Cambridge, 1929
- Honorary fellow of the Royal College of Music

== Selected bibliography ==
- The Life and Campaigns of Alexander Leslie, First Earl of Leven. Longmans, Green and Co. (1899)
- The Rising of 1745: with a bibliography of Jacobite history 1689-1788, David Nutt (1903)
- John Graham of Claverhouse, Viscount of Dundee. Archibald Constable and company (1905)
- A Short History of Europe, From the Fall of the Roman Empire to the Fall of the Eastern Empire (1911)
- Bach's Chorals, Vol.I (1915), Vol.II (1917), Vol.III (1921)
- Johann Sebastian Bach, Harcourt, Brace and Howe, New York (1920)
- Bach: the Cantatas and Oratorios, Oxford University Press (1925)
- Bach: the Mass in B Minor, Oxford University Press (1926)
- Bach Cantata Texts, Sacred and Secular With a Reconstruction of the Leipzig Liturgy of His Period, Constable (1926)
- Bach: A Biography, Oxford University Press (1928)
- The Four-Part Chorales of J.S. Bach, Oxford University Press (1929)
- John Christian Bach, Oxford University Press (1929)
- The Music of Bach: an introduction, Dover Publications, Inc. (1928 & 1933)
- The pianist's book of Bach chorals: 100 chorals harmonised by J.S. Bach, chosen from the collection of Terry by A.B. Ashby, Oxford University Press (1937)
