= Reconstruction of music by Johann Sebastian Bach =

Lost versions of compositions by Johann Sebastian Bach can be reconstructed on the basis of extant versions of similar music. Reasons for such reconstructions include extension of the repertoire and testing hypotheses about the genesis history of known pieces. For instance, in the late 19th century it was discovered that Bach likely transcribed his Concerto for two harpsichords in C minor, BWV 1060, from a lost earlier version for violin and oboe. Reconstructions of BWV 1060 to its presumed original version, published from the 1920s, extended the Bach repertoire for oboists.

A more elaborate undertaking was the reconstruction of Bach's lost St Mark Passion, BWV 247: its libretto, printed in 1732, survived without music. Bach's two surviving Passions (St Matthew and St John) are among the composer's most often performed vocal works, and Bach's most popular oratorio, the Christmas Oratorio, written in the early 1730s like the St Mark Passion, was apparently to a large extent based on earlier compositions by Bach: a similar assumption was made for the St Mark. From the second half of the 20th century, there were several attempts to reconstruct the St Mark based on extant material from Bach's music library.

Since the 19th century, a violin concerto model has been suggested for Bach's first Harpsichord Concerto, BWV 1052: the violin concertos resulting from various reconstruction attempts seem to indicate, at least according to Peter Wollny, that for this harpsichord concerto there was likely no violin concerto model. In the 1980s Peter Williams suggested that the well-known Toccata and Fugue in D minor, BWV 565, for organ, may have been based on piece for violin: in this case the violin version reconstruction appeared to be more convincing. In the introduction of the 1990 second edition of the Bach-Werke-Verzeichnis (BWV), Wolfgang Schmieder suggested to indicate reconstructions by the addition of a "R" to the BWV number of the extant version of the composition on which the reconstruction was based, thus, e.g. the violin and oboe version of the BWV 1060 concerto would be numbered BWV 1060R.

== Vocal music ==
Reconstructions of Bach's vocal music are often based on surviving lyrics, such as librettos, which show similarities with those of extant music, so that the variant text can be combined with the known music.

In vocal music, recitatives are often a particularly difficult challenge for reconstruction: when Bach parodied his own vocal music, he reused music of arias, duets and choruses for the new work, but recitatives with different lyrics were less suitable for such transcriptions. For example, when he adapted Vereinigte Zwietracht der wechselnden Saiten, BWV 207, one of his secular cantatas, into Auf, schmetternde Töne der muntern Trompeten, BWV 207a, for a different occasion, he reused the music of all movements except the music of the recitative movements 2, 4 and 6: he composed new music for the recitatives of the later work. An exception appears to have been when he parodied the Michaelmas cantata BWV 248a, recitatives and all, into the sixth part of his Christmas Oratorio: how exactly he proceeded with this adaptation can however not be ascertained while the text of the BWV 248a cantata went lost. Reconstruction of recitatives may depend on borrowing music of recitatives with somewhat similar lyrics (e.g. Simon Heighes 1995), or re-composing recitatives in the style of Bach (e.g. Ton Koopman 2000).

Reconstruction of chorale movements of lost church music is helped by the fact that hundreds of Bach's four-part chorales survive, including separate chorales such as BWV 253–438 and 1122–1126, which are most likely nearly exclusively chorale settings from otherwise lost larger vocal works. With some educated guesswork Bach scholars such as Friedrich Smend and Klaus Häfner have coupled extant chorale settings with hymn verses in librettos of otherwise lost works.

=== Cantatas ===
Bach likely composed around 300 church cantatas, of which around 200 are extant. In other words, nearly two of his five cantata cycles were lost: the larger part of what is conventionally indicated as his fourth and fifth cycles is lost. For his secular cantatas, less than half of the around 50 known works are fully extant. Several dozens of Bach cantata librettos survive without music, many of these by Picander, published in his Ernst-Schertzhaffte und Satyrische Gedichte: a few of these are at least partially reconstructible based on known works.

Examples of at least partially reconstructed Bach cantatas include:

- Steigt freudig in die Luft, BWV 36a
- Die Freude reget sich, BWV 36b
- Der Himmel dacht auf Anhalts Ruhm und Glück, BWV 66a
- Erwählte Pleißenstadt, BWV 216a
- Entfliehet, verschwindet, entweichet, ihr Sorgen, BWV 249a
- Entfernet euch, ihr heitern Sterne, BWV Anh. 9
- Böse Welt, schmäh immerhin, the cantata for Judica of Picander's 1728–29 libretto cycle, a 1983 reconstruction by Gustav Adolf Theill, based on music of the secular cantata BWV 209.

=== Passions, oratorios, and church music in Latin ===
Reconstructions range from small repairs (e.g. the last measures of laudes "D" of the Magnificat in E-flat major, BWV 243a), to reconstructions of entire Passions (e.g. several reconstructions of the St Mark Passion, BWV 247).

== Instrumental music ==
Schmieder's suggestion to add a "R" to a BWV number to indicate a reconstruction was, in practice, nearly only applied to some of the concerto reconstructions.

=== Solo pieces ===
Reconstructions of Bach's instrumental music include the recasting of the Toccata and Fugue in D minor, BWV 565, for organ, as a surmised anterior version for solo violin.

=== Concertos ===
Reconstructions based on Bach's harpsichord concertos include:

- BWV 1050a: the early version of the fifth Brandenburg Concerto, BWV 1050, has only been incompletely transmitted. For instance, the violone part of the last two movements of that early version went missing. Alfred Dürr reconstructed the violone part based on a spurious cello part for the later version of the concerto.
- BWV 1052R: based on BWV 1052, 1052a and/or on cantata movements BWV 146/1 (Sinfonia) and /2 (Chorus), and/or on what is known regarding the lost opening Sinfonia of BWV 188 (a variant of the third movement of BWV 1052 scored for oboe, strings and obligato organ):
  - Violin Concerto in D minor
  - Organ Concerto in D minor
- BWV 1053R: based on BWV 1053 and/or cantata movements BWV 169/1 (Sinfonia), /5 (Aria) and 49/1 (Sinfonia):
  - Oboe d'amore Concerto in D major
  - Oboe Concerto in F major
  - Organ Concerto in D major
- BWV 1055R: based on BWV 1055:
  - Oboe d'amore Concerto in A major
- BWV 1056R: based on BWV 1056 and/or (for the middle movement) BWV 156/1 (Sinfonia):
  - Violin Concerto in G minor
  - Oboe Concerto in G minor
- BWV 1059R: based on the BWV 1059 fragment and on cantata movements BWV 35/1 (Sinfonia of Part I), 156/1 (Sinfonia) or 35/2 (Aria), and 35/5 (Sinfonia of Part II):
  - Harpsichord Concerto in D minor
  - Oboe Concerto in D minor
  - Organ Concerto in D minor
- BWV 1060R: based on BWV 1060:
  - Concerto for Violin and Oboe in C minor
  - Concerto for Violin and Oboe in D minor
  - Concerto for Two Violins in C minor
- BWV 1063R: based on BWV 1063:
  - Concerto for Violin, Oboe and Flute in D minor
  - Concerto for Three Violins in D minor
- BWV 1064R: based on BWV 1064:
  - Concerto for Three Violins in D major

Legend to the table
column		content
1	BWV	Bach-Werke-Verzeichnis (lit. 'Bach-works-catalogue'; BWV) numbers. Anhang (Annex; Anh.) numbers are indicated as follows: preceded by I: in Anh. I (lost works) of BWV^{1} (1950 first edition of the BWV); preceded by II: in Anh. II (doubtful works) of BWV^{1}; preceded by III: in Anh. III (spurious works) of BWV^{1}; preceded by N: new Anh. numbers in BWV^{2} (1990) and/or BWV^{2a} (1998)
2	^{2a}	Section in which the composition appears in BWV^{2a}: Chapters of the main catalogue indicated by Arabic numerals (1-13); Anh. sections indicated by Roman numerals (I–III); Reconstructions published in the NBE indicated by "R"
3	Date	Date associated with the completion of the listed version of the composition. Exact dates (e.g. for most cantatas) usually indicate the assumed date of first (public) performance. When the date is followed by an abbreviation in brackets (e.g. JSB for Johann Sebastian Bach) it indicates the date of that person's involvement with the composition as composer, scribe or publisher.
4	Name	Name of the composition: if the composition is known by a German incipit, that German name is preceded by the composition type (e.g. cantata, chorale prelude, motet, ...)
5	Key	Key of the composition
6	Scoring	See scoring table below for the abbreviations used in this column
7	BG	Bach Gesellschaft-Ausgabe (BG edition; BGA): numbers before the colon indicate the volume in that edition. After the colon an Arabic numeral indicates the page number where the score of the composition begins, while a Roman numeral indicates a description of the composition in the Vorwort (Preface) of the volume.
8	NBE	New Bach Edition (German: Neue Bach-Ausgabe, NBA): Roman numerals for the series, followed by a slash, and the volume number in Arabic numerals. A page number, after a colon, refers to the "Score" part of the volume. Without such page number, the composition is only described in the "Critical Commentary" part of the volume. The volumes group Bach's compositions by genre: 1. Cantatas (Vol. 1–34: church cantatas grouped by occasion; Vol. 35–40: secular cantatas; Vol. 41: Varia); 2. Masses, Passions, Oratorios (12 volumes); 3. Motets, Chorales, Lieder (4 volumes); 4. Organ Works (11 volumes); 5. Keyboard and Lute Works (14 volumes); 6. Chamber Music (5 volumes); 7. Orchestral Works (7 volumes); 8. Canons, Musical Offering, Art of Fugue (3 volumes); 9. Addenda (approximately 7 volumes)
9	Additional info	may include: "after" – indicating a model for the composition; "by" – indicating the composer of the composition (if different from Johann Sebastian Bach); "in" – indicating the oldest known source for the composition; "pasticcio" – indicating a composition with parts of different origin; "see" – composition renumbered in a later edition of the BWV; "text" – by text author, or, in source; Provenance of standard texts and tunes, such as Lutheran hymns and their chorale melodies, Latin liturgical texts (e.g. Magnificat) and common tunes (e.g. Folia), are not usually indicated in this column. For an overview of such resources used by Bach, see individual composition articles, and overviews in, e.g., Chorale cantata (Bach)#Bach's chorale cantatas, List of chorale harmonisations by Johann Sebastian Bach#Chorale harmonisations in various collections and List of organ compositions by Johann Sebastian Bach#Chorale Preludes.
10	BD	Bach Digital Work page

Legend for abbreviations in "Scoring" column
Voices (see also SATB)
a	A	b	B	s	S	t	T	v			V	
alto (solo part)	alto (choir part)	bass (solo part)	bass (choir part)	soprano (solo part)	soprano (choir part)	tenor (solo part)	tenor (choir part)	voice (includes parts for unspecified voices or instruments as in some canons)			vocal music for unspecified voice type	
Winds and battery (bold = soloist)
Bas	Bel	Cnt	Fl	Hn	Ob	Oba	Odc	Tai	Tbn	Tdt	Tmp	Tr
bassoon (can be part of Bc, see below)	bell(s) (musical bells)	cornett, cornettino	flute (traverso, flauto dolce, piccolo, flauto basso)	natural horn, corno da caccia, corno da tirarsi, lituo	oboe	oboe d'amore	oboe da caccia	taille	trombone	tromba da tirarsi	timpani	tromba (natural trumpet, clarino trumpet)
Strings and keyboard (bold = soloist)
Bc		Hc	Kb	Lu	Lw	Org	Str	Va	Vc	Vdg	Vl	Vne
basso continuo: Vdg, Hc, Vc, Bas, Org, Vne and/or Lu		harpsichord	keyboard (Hc, Lw, Org or clavichord)	lute, theorbo	Lautenwerck (lute-harpsichord)	organ (/man. = manualiter, without pedals)	strings: Vl I, Vl II and Va	viola(s), viola d'amore, violetta	violoncello, violoncello piccolo	viola da gamba	violin(s), violino piccolo	violone, violone grosso

Reconstructions published in the New Bach Edition
BWV	^{2a}	Date	Name	Key	Scoring	BG	NBE	Additional info	BD
1052R	R	1970	Concerto	D min.	**Vl** Str Bc		VII/7: 3	by Fischer; after BWV 1052	01236
1055R	R	1970	Concerto	A maj.	**Oba** Str Bc		VII/7: 33	by Fischer; after BWV 1055	01240
1056R	R	1970	Concerto	G min.	**Vl** Str Bc		VII/7: 59	by Fischer; after BWV 1056	01241
1060R	R	1970	Concerto	C min.	**Vl** **Ob** Str Bc		VII/7: 75	by Fischer; after BWV 1060	01245
1064R	R	1970	Concerto	D maj.	**3Vl** Str Bc		VII/7: 103	by Fischer; after BWV 1064	01250

== Sources ==
- Butt, John (2015). Bach Violin Concertos (PDF) (liner notes). Cecilia Bernardini, Dunedin Consort. Hyperion. CKD519.
- Glöckner, Andreas (2000). "Eine Michaeliskantate als Parodievorlage für den sechsten Teil des Bachschen Weihnachts-Oratoriums?" [A Michaelmas cantata as model for Part VI of Bach's Christmas Oratorio?]. In Schulze, Hans-Joachim; Wolff, Christoph (eds.). Bach-Jahrbuch 2000 [Bach Yearbook 2000]. Bach-Jahrbuch (in German). Vol. 86. Neue Bachgesellschaft. Leipzig: Evangelische Verlagsanstalt. pp. 317–326. doi:10.13141/bjb.v2000. ISBN 3-374-01828-9. ISSN 0084-7682.
- Schmieder, Wolfgang, ed. (1990). Thematisch-systematisches Verzeichnis der musikalischen Werke von Johann Sebastian Bach: Bach-Werke-Verzeichnis – 2. überarbeitete und erweiterte Ausgabe [Thematic-Systematic Catalogue of the Musical Works of Johann Sebastian Bach: Bach-Works-Catalogue – 2nd reworked and enlarged edition] (in German) (BWV^{2} ed.). Wiesbaden: Breitkopf & Härtel. ISBN 9783765102554.
- Schneider, Max [in German], ed. (1924). Joh. Seb. Bach: Konzert in D moll für Violine, Oboe oder für zwei Violinen und Streichorchester aus der Fassung für zwei Klaviere und Streichorchester C moll zurückübertragen. Breitkopf & Härtel. OCLC 22853563.
- Seiffert, Max, ed. (1920). Konzert C moll für Violine und Oboe oder für zwei Violinen mit Klavierbegleitung von J. S. Bach. C. F. Peters. OCLC 760029773.
- Voigt, Woldemar (1886). Chrysander, Friedrich; Spitta, Philipp; Adler, Guido (eds.). "Über die Originalgestalt von J. S. Bach's Konzert für zwei Klaviere in Cmoll (Nr. 1)". Vierteljahrsschrift für Musikwissenschaft (in German). II. Leipzig: Breitkopf & Härtel: 482–487.
- Wollny, Peter (2015). "Harpsichord Concertos". Johann Sebastian Bach: Harpsichord Concertos (PDF) (liner notes). Andreas Staier, Freiburger Barockorchester. Harmonia Mundi. pp. 6–7. HMC 902181.82. Archived from the original (PDF) on 2015-09-22.
