= Concerto for two harpsichords in C minor, BWV 1060 =

Composition by Johann Sebastian Bach

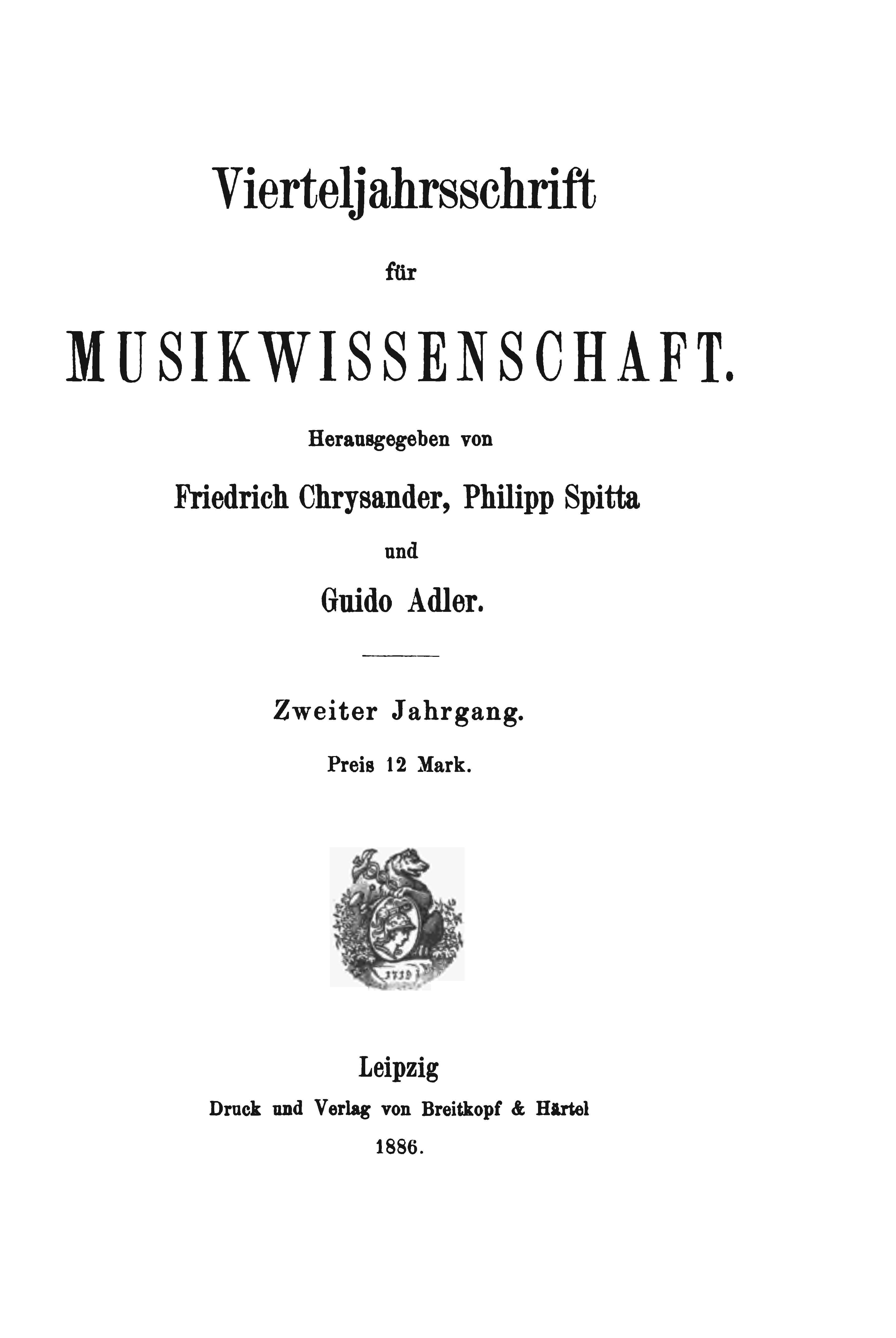
Title page of the 1886 volume of Vierteljahrsschrift für Musikwissenschaft, in which Woldemar Voigt argued that the model for Bach's concerto for two harpsichords in C minor, BWV 1060, would have been a lost concerto for oboe and violin.

The concerto for two harpsichords in C minor, BWV 1060, is a concerto for two harpsichords and string orchestra by Johann Sebastian Bach. It is likely to have originated in the second half of the 1730s as an arrangement of an earlier concerto, also in C minor, for oboe and violin. That conjectural original version of the concerto, which may have been composed in Bach's Köthen years (1717–1723), is lost, but has been reconstructed in several versions known as BWV 1060R.

== History ==
While the extant 18th-century manuscripts present the concerto in a form for two harpsichords and strings, the assumption that it originated as concerto for violin and oboe has become widely accepted since the late 19th century. The precise date for this earlier concerto is unknown, but it is believed to have been in existence from the early 1720s. The version for two harpsichords likely originated in or around 1736. A broader estimate for the time of origin of the version for two harpsichords is 1735–1740.

== Structure ==
The concerto is scored for two harpsichords (cembalo concertato I and II), two violin parts (violin I and II), viola and basso continuo. The difference in texture and figuration of both solo instruments is clearest in the outer Allegro movements. In these movements, the melody lines of the cembalo II part are generally more lyrical and less agile than those of the cembalo I part. The Adagio middle movement, where the melody lines of both solo instruments imitate one another without distinction in texture and figuration, has been likened to the middle movement of Bach's double violin concerto, BWV 1043.

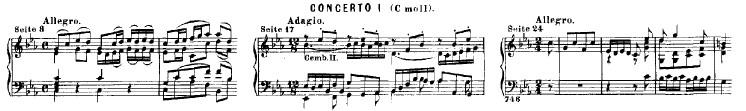
I. Allegro	II. Adagio	III. Allegro

Length: c. 14 minutes for the recording in § Reconstructed versions

=== I. Allegro ===
The theme with which the first Allegro movement opens is transformed in various ways, returning in its original form only at the end of the movement.

=== II. Adagio ===
Concerto for oboe and violin, BWV 1060R
II. Adagio
Performed by the University of Washington Sinfonietta, conducted by Vilem Sokol, with Laila Storch (oboe) and Martin Friedmann (violin)

The Adagio middle movement has a cantabile melody which is treated imitatively by both solo instruments, accompanied by the string orchestra. 18th-century manuscripts contain two versions for the accompaniment: in one version the string instruments play with bows (arco), in the other pizzicato.

=== III. Allegro ===
The ritornello of the last movement has an up-tempo bourrée-like theme, on which also the episodes for the soloists are almost entirely based.

== Reception ==
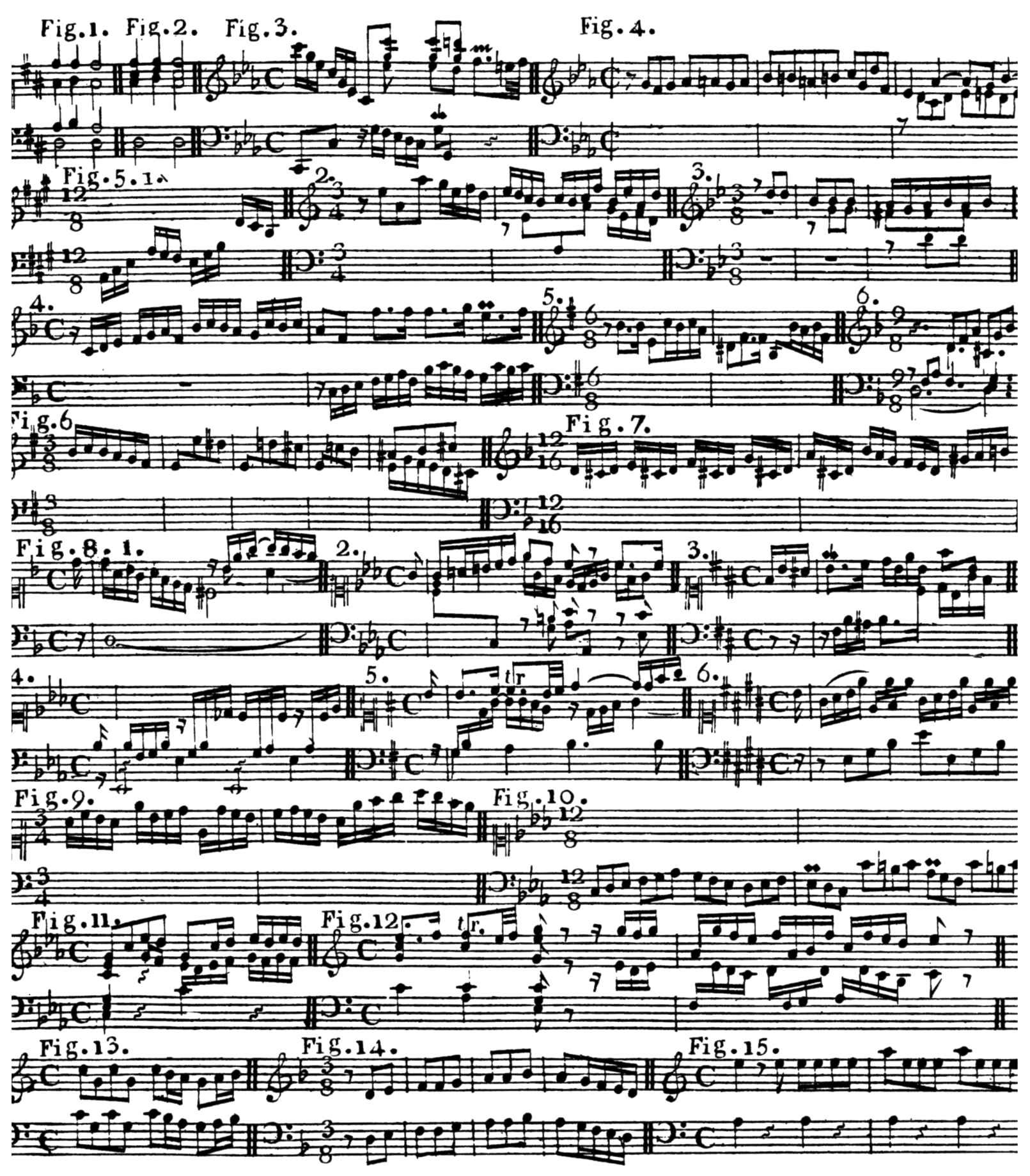
First page of music examples in Forkel's 1802 biography of Johann Sebastian Bach: the incipit of BWV 1060 is Fig. 11 on this page.

In his early 19th-century Bach biography, Johann Nikolaus Forkel described the concerto as "very old", by which he probably meant he found its style antiquated. The concerto was published in 1848, edited by Friedrich Konrad Griepenkerl.

In the 1874 preface to the Bach Gesellschaft edition of the concerto for two harpsichords, Wilhelm Rust had suggested that the original version of the concerto would have been for two violins. In 1886 Woldemar Voigt wrote that the original instrument for the part of the second harpsichord was more likely an oboe, and that the original of the concerto could almost certainly be identified with a lost concerto for oboe and violin mentioned in a 1764 Breitkopf catalogue.

=== Reconstructed versions ===
Concerto for two violins, BWV 1060R
I. Allegro

II. Adagio

III. Allegro
Performed by the Advent Chamber Orchestra with David Perry and Roxana Pavel Goldstein (violins)

Max Schneider's reconstruction as a concerto for two violins in D minor was performed in 1920 at the Leipzig Bach Festival. According to Max Seiffert it makes more sense to keep the same key as the keyboard version, that is C minor, when reconstructing the concerto for violin and oboe soloists.

In his preface to the 1990 second edition of the Bach-Werke-Verzeichnis (BWV), Wolfgang Schmieder proposed to add a capital "R" to a BWV number to indicate a reconstructed version of a composition that is only extant in a later version, hence a reconstruction of a conjectured earlier version of the BWV 1060 concerto can be indicated as BWV 1060R. Schmieder used the 1060R catalogue number for a reconstruction in C minor, for oboe and violin soloists, in the 1990 version of the BWV.

Published reconstructions:

- Seiffert, Max, ed. (1920). Konzert C moll für Violine und Oboe oder für zwei Violinen mit Klavierbegleitung von J. S. Bach. C. F. Peters. OCLC 760029773.
- Schneider, Max [in German], ed. (1924). Joh. Seb. Bach: Konzert in D moll für Violine, Oboe oder für zwei Violinen und Streichorchester aus der Fassung für zwei Klaviere und Streichorchester C moll zurückübertragen. Breitkopf & Härtel. OCLC 22853563.
- Fischer, Wilfried, ed. (1970). "Konzert für Oboe und Violine c-moll, Rekonstrunktion nach dem Konzert für 2 Cembali BWV 1060". Lost Solo Concertos in Reconstructions. Johann Sebastian Bach: New Edition of the Complete Works. Vol. Series VII: Orchestral Works, Vol. 7. Bärenreiter. ISMN 9790006462094.
- Hofmann, Klaus, ed. (1997). Doppelkonzert d-moll rekonstruiert nach BWV 1060. Breitkopf & Hartel. ISMN 9790004210307.

=== Recordings ===
On CD recordings, BWV 1060R is often combined with Bach's violin concertos BWV 1041–1043.

Recordings of BWV 1060(R)
Yr.	Sol.	k	Performers	Issued
1950	Ob•Vn	c/R	Tabuteau, Stern; Prades Festival Orchestra, Casals	Sony SMK 58982
1956	2Pno	c	Appleton, Field; Castle Hill Festival Orchestra, Brief	CMD 318
1958	2Hps	c	Dart, Vaughan; Philomusica of London	OL 50165
1960	2Hps	c	Veyron-Lacroix, Beckensteiner; Orchestre de chambre J.-F. Paillard, Paillard	Erato LDE3124
1962	Ob•Vn	d/R	Goossens, Menuhin; Bath Festival Orchestra, Menuhin	EMI 2536642
1962	2Hps	c	Leonhardt, Müller; Leonhardt Consort	Teldec 6.35049
1963	Ob•Vn	d/R	Shann, Büchner; Münchener Bach-Orchester, Richter	Archiv 198 321
1963	2Hps	c	Richter, Bilgram; Münchener Bach-Orchester	Archiv 198 321
1967	2Pno	c	Casadesus, R. & G.; Zurich Chamber Orchestra, de Stoutz	CBS 61 140
1970	Ob•Vn	d/R	Holliger, Grumiaux; New Philharmonia Orchestra, de Waart	Philips 420 700-2
1982	Ob•Vn	c/R	Killmer, Zukerman; Saint Paul Chamber Orchestra, Zukerman	CBS MK37278
1985	2Pno	c	Eschenbach, Frantz; Hamburger Philharmoniker	DG 415 655-2
1985	Ob•Vn	c/R	Boyd, Accardo; Chamber Orchestra of Europe, Accardo	Philips 416 414-1
1988	Ob•Vn	d/R	Black, Zimmermann; English Chamber Orchestra, Tate	EMI CDC 7498622
1989	2Pno	c/A	Pekinel sisters; James	CBS MK45579
1989	Ob•Vn	c/R	Goodwin, Wallfisch; The King's Consort, King	Hyperion CDH55347
1992	2Hps	c	Schornsheim, Thalheim; Neues Bachisches Collegium Musicum, Glaetzner	Brilliant 99360/7
1996	2Vn	d/R	Manze, Podger; Academy of Ancient Music	HMU 907155
1998	2Pno	c/A	Pekinel sisters; Jacques Loussier Trio	Teldec 8573-80823-2
2000	Ob•Vn	d/R	Goritzki, Poppen; Bach-Collegium Stuttgart, Rilling	HC 92.131
2000	Ob•Vn	d/R	Kreeft, Heberlin; Netherlands Bach Ensemble, Koetsveld	Brilliant 99360/9
2000	Ob•Vn	d/R	Mayer, Kennedy; Berliner Philharmoniker	EMI 6290572
2003	2Pno	c	Pekinel sisters; Zurich Chamber Orchestra, Griffiths	Warner 2564 61950-2
2004	Ob•Vn	c/R	Löffler, Seiler; Akademie für Alte Musik Berlin, Mai	HMC 901876
2008	Ob•Vn	c/R	Rubtsov, Fischer; Academy of St Martin in the Fields	Decca 478 0650
2010	Tr•Vn	c/A	Boldoczki, Baráti; Franz Liszt Chamber Orchestra	Sony 88697724182
2011	Ob•Vn	c/R	Abberger, Lamon; Tafelmusik Baroque Orchestra, Lamon	AN 29878
2011	Ob•Vn	c/R	Torunczyk, Kraemer; Concerto Copenhagen, Mortensen	cpo 777 904-2
2011	2Hps	c	Mortensen, Pinnock; Concerto Copenhagen	cpo 777 681-2
2012	Hps•Vn	c/A	Dantone, Mullova; Accademia Bizantina	Onyx 4114
2013	Ob•Vn	c/R	Puskunigis, Venslovaitė; St. Christopher Chamber Orchestra, Katkus	Brilliant 94991
2013	Ob•Vn	c/R	Ruiz, Huggett; Portland Baroque Orchestra	AV 2324
2014	Ob•Vn	c/R	Leleux, Batiashvili; Kammerorchester des Bayerischen Rundfunks, Szulc	DG 479 2479
2014	Ob•Vn	c/R	Bernardini, A. & C.; Dunedin Consort, Butt	Hyperion CKD519
2015	Ob•Vn	c/R	Barocksolisten München, Seel	HC 16006
2015	Ob•Vn	c/R	Hamann, Zukerman; National Arts Centre Orchestra, Zukerman	AN 28783
2017	2Hps	c	Hantaï, Häkkinen; Helsinki Baroque Orchestra	AE-10087
2017	2Vn	d/R	Zimmermann, F. P. & S.; Berliner Barock Solisten	HC 17046

The slow movement of Karl Richter's recording, with Hedwig Bilgram and the Münchener Bach-Orchester, also features in the soundtrack of Stanley Kubrick's Barry Lyndon (1975).

== Sources ==
- Bach, Johann Sebastian (1848). Griepenkerl, Friedrich Konrad [in German] (ed.). Concert (en Ut mineur) pour deux clavecins avec deux violons, viola et basse. Compositions pour le piano-forte sans et avec accompagnement par Jean Sébastien Bach: Edition nouvelle, soigneusement revue, corrigée, métronomisée et doigtée; enrichie de notes sur l'exécution et accompagnée d'une préface – Oeuvres complettes. Vol. 13. Leipzig: C. F. Peters. hdl:2027/mdp.39015007904116.
- Boyd, Malcolm (1993). Bach: The Brandenburg Concertos. Cambridge University Press. ISBN 0521387132.
- Butt, John (1999). "Harpsichord Concertos". In Boyd, Malcolm; Butt, John (eds.). J.S. Bach. Oxford Composer Companions. Oxford University Press. ISBN 978-0-19-866208-2.
- Butt, John (2015). Bach Violin Concertos (PDF) (liner notes). Cecilia Bernardini, Dunedin Consort. Hyperion. CKD519.
- Clements, Dominy (2015). "Johann Sebastian Bach: Violin Concertos". www.musicweb-international.com.
- Forkel, Johann Nikolaus (1802). Ueber Johann Sebastian Bachs Leben, Kunst und Kunstwerke. Leipzig: Hoffmeister und Kühnel.
- Forkel, Johann Nikolaus (1920). Johann Sebastian Bach: His Life, Art, and Work. Translated from the German, with notes and appendices, by Charles Sanford Terry. New York: Harcourt, Brace and Howe.
- Jones, Richard D. P. (2013). "Concertos for two harpsichords". The Creative Development of Johann Sebastian Bach: Music to Delight the Spirit. Vol. II: 1717–1750. Oxford University Press. pp. 254–257. ISBN 9780199696284.
- King, Robert (1989). Bach: Violin Concertos (PDF) (liner notes). Catherine Mackintosh, Elizabeth Wallfisch, Paul Goodwin, The King's Consort. Hyperion. CDH55347.
- Rust, Wilhelm (1874). "Vorwort". Joh. Seb. Bach's Kammermusik, Fünfter Band: Drei Concerte für zwei Claviere mit Orchesterbegleitung. Bach-Gesellschaft Ausgabe (in German). Vol. 21.2. Breitkopf & Härtel. pp. V–X.
- Schmieder, Wolfgang (1990). Bach-Werke-Verzeichnis (2nd ed.). Wiesbaden: Breitkopf & Härtel. ISBN 9783765102554.
- Schneider, Max [in German] (1907). "Verzeichnis der bis zum Jahre 1851 gedruckten (und der geschrieben im Handel gewesenen) Werke von Johann Sebastian Bach". Bach-Jahrbuch 1906. Bach-Jahrbuch (in German). Breitkopf & Härtel. pp. 84–113.
- Seiffert, Max (1920). "Preface". Konzert C moll für Violine und Oboe oder für zwei Violinen mit Klavierbegleitung von J.S. Bach. Edition Peters. hdl:2027/pst.000056850000.
- Spitta, Philipp (1899). Johann Sebastian Bach: His Work and Influence on the Music of Germany, 1685–1750. Vol. III. Translated by Clara Bell; J. A. Fuller Maitland. Novello & Co.
  - Volume III
- Voigt, Woldemar (1886). Chrysander, Friedrich; Spitta, Philipp; Adler, Guido (eds.). "Über die Originalgestalt von J. S. Bach's Konzert für zwei Klaviere in Cmoll (Nr. 1)". Vierteljahrsschrift für Musikwissenschaft (in German). II. Leipzig: Breitkopf & Härtel: 482–487.
