= Geschwinde, geschwinde, ihr wirbelnden Winde, BWV 201 =

Bach cantata, BWV 201

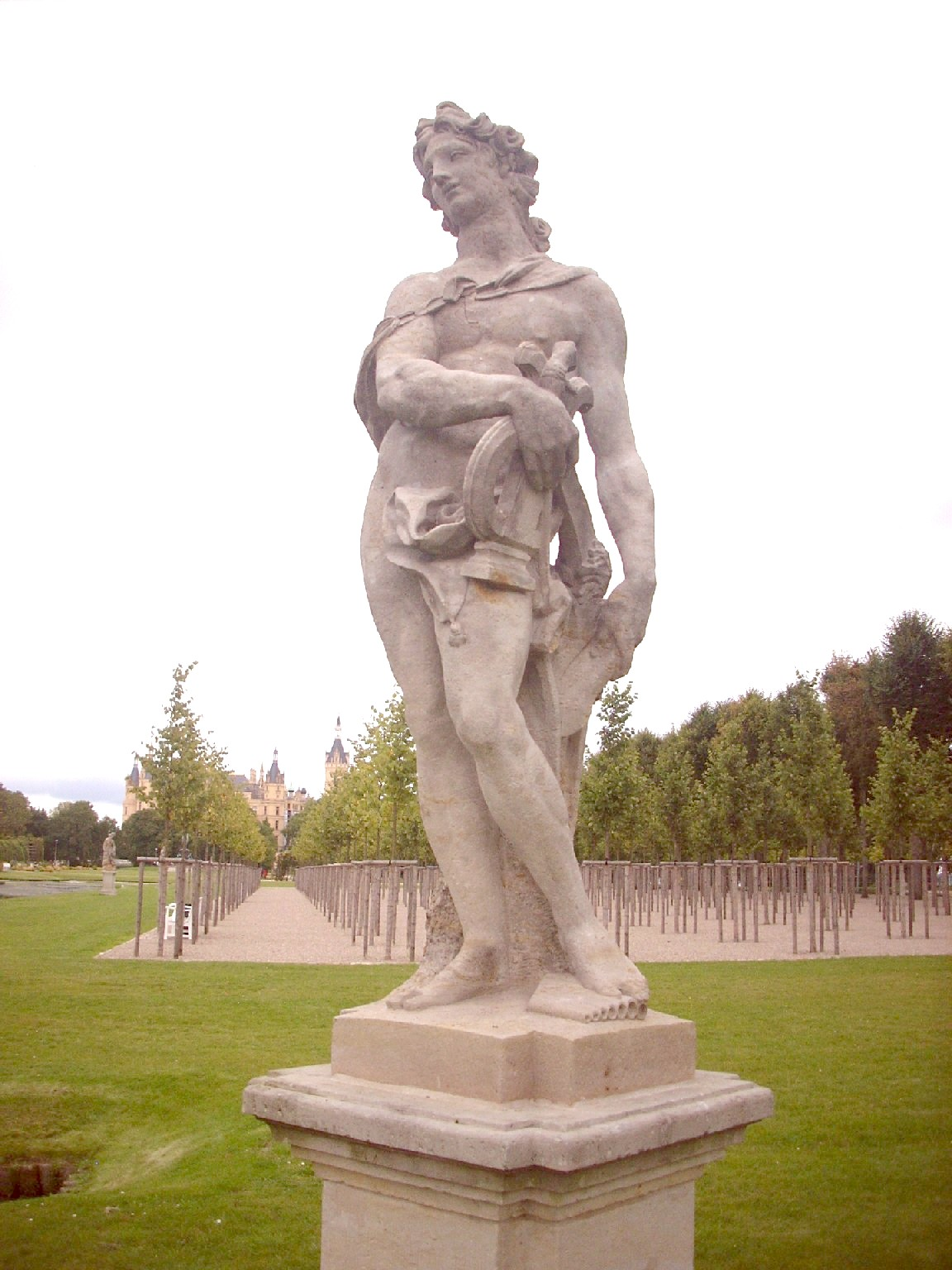
Phoebus Apollo with the lyre, having defeated Pan in musical competition, with Pan's flute under his foot; sculpture in the Schlossgarten of Schwerin, Germany, 1720

Geschwinde, geschwinde, ihr wirbelnden Winde (Swift, swift, you swirling winds), BWV 201, is a secular cantata by Johann Sebastian Bach, on a libretto by Picander (pen name of Christian Friedrich Henrici). It is a dramma per musica, likely composed for a public performance in 1729, around which time its oldest extant printed libretto was published. The text, titled Der Streit zwischen Phoebus und Pan (The Contest between Phoebus and Pan), is based on the "Ears of a Donkey" story in Ovid's Metamorphoses, and mocks unsophisticated music in favour of a more intelligent composition style.

The music is scored for SATTBB singers, and a baroque orchestra which includes trumpets, timpani, traversos, oboes, strings and continuo. The cantata has been recorded several times from the 1950s to the 21st century.

== History ==
Geschwinde, geschwinde, ihr wirbelnden Winde was likely composed for Leipzig's autumn fair of 1729, or, in that year, for a weekly concert outside the periods of Leipzig's fairs. Its oldest extant separately printed libretto, which can not be dated exactly, was published around this time, its full title being Der Streit Zwischen PHOEBUS und PAN in einem DRAMATE aufgeführet Von J. S. Bach (The Contest between Phoebus and Pan performed as a drama by J. S. Bach). Likely the work was first performed in Zimmermann's coffeehouse or coffee garden by the Collegium Musicum that had come under Bach's direction in March 1729.

According to Philipp Spitta, the cantata is part of the early stages of the controversy between Bach and Johann Adolph Scheibe. That controversy, best known for the polemic that followed Scheibe's publication of a criticism of J. S. Bach in 1737, would have had its origin in Scheibe's failed attempt to become an organist at one of Leipzig's churches in 1729, where Bach had been one of the judges who preferred another candidate above Scheibe. In that version of the events, Phoebus would have been a character representing Bach, while Midas represented Scheibe. This interpretation by Spitta was later doubted: an analysis published by Arnold Schering in 1941 showed that Spitta had some of the facts wrong. For instance, Scheibe was competing for a different position than the one described by Spitta. More importantly, in 1731 Bach wrote a very favourable letter of recommendation to help Scheibe get an assignment, so it seems unlikely he would have been mocking Scheibe in his 1729 cantata.

Picander included a print of the cantata's libretto in the 1732 third volume of his Ernst-Schertzhaffte und Satyrische Gedichte. In the publication, the text incipit reads Geschwinde, ihr wirbelnden Winde (Swift, you swirling winds). The work appears to have been performed again in Leipzig in the 1730s. Bach's sons Johann Christian and Johann Christoph Friedrich produced a handwritten copy of the cantata's libretto in 1749, which indicates a repeat performance of the work in that year. This version of the libretto contains a few text adaptations which seem to indicate that Bach made the cantata applicable to a controversy which his student (and later successor) Johann Friedrich Doles, then living in Freiberg, was subjected to by his superior, Johann Gottlieb Biedermann.

== Plot, scoring and structure ==
The plot of The Contest between Phoebus and Pan, BWV 201, is based on the "Ears of a Donkey" (Latin: Midae aures, lit. 'Midas's Ears') part of Midas's story, as found in the eleventh book of Ovid's Metamorphoses. In the ancient story there is an interaction of four characters: Pan, playing a pan flute, and Apollo (a.k.a. Phoebus), playing a lyre (or: cithara), have a musical contest of which the mountain god Tmolus is the arbiter. Tmolus decides in favour of the charming melody produced by Apollo, a judgement which is contested by Midas, who prefers Pan's rustic sounds. Tmolus punishes Midas for his stupidity by turning his ears into the ears of a donkey. In Picander's libretto there are two additional characters: Mercury, god of commerce, and Momus, god of mockery. Both Mercury and Apollo were symbolical representations of Leipzig: Mercury of its business aspect (exemplified e.g. by its fairs), and Apollo of its learning (exemplified e.g. by its university).

The work has six arias, one for each of the six characters. Bucolic arias (Momus, Pan, Midas) alternate with lyrical ones (Phoebus, Tmolus, Mercury). Each aria is preceded and followed by a recitative, which gives a total of seven recitatives. In the opening and closing movements all six voices of the characters sing as a chorus. Together with these two movements the total number of movements is 15.

Arias and characters in BWV 201
#	Character	Aria	Voice (abbr.)
3	Momus	Patron, das macht der Wind!	Soprano (S)
5	Phoebus	Mit Verlangen drück ich deine zarten Wangen	Bass I (BI)
7	Pan	Zu Tanze, zu Sprunge	Bass II (BII)
9	Tmolus	Phoebus, deine Melodei	Tenor I (TI)
11	Midas	Pan ist Meister, lasst ihn gehn!	Tenor II (TII)
13	Mercury	Aufgeblasne Hitze, aber wenig Grütze	Alto (A)

The orchestral accompaniment consists of three trumpets (TrI, TrII, TrIII), timpani (Ti), two traversos (TraI, TraII), two oboes (ObI, ObII), oboe d'amore (Oba), strings (Str) and basso continuo, which plays throughout. The string section consists of first violins (VnI), second violins (VnII) and a part for viola(s) (Va). All the instruments, except the oboe d'amore, join in the initial and final tutti choruses.

In the opening chorus, the winds are summoned to recede, so that an environment without background noise will make the sounds of what will follow clearer, and make an unhampered echo possible. The first recitative starts with Phoebus disputing that Pan's song would excel his own, and Pan boasting about his own musical qualities. Momus starts to mock Pan, and continues to do so in his ensuing aria. In the second recitative, Mercury suggests that the two contestants each choose a judge, so Tmolus and Midas are chosen by Phoebus and Pan respectively. Then Mercury bids to give attention, after which Apollo sings his aria, a love song to Hyacinth. In the recitative following that aria Momus invites Pan to step up: Pan obliges and sings his dance aria, employing some of the effects customary in comic opera – the over-all effect of the aria being a musical joke. Bach later re-used the music of this aria in the Peasant Cantata. Bach's music does not refer to the instruments associated with Phoebus and Pan in their respective arias, i.e. a lute-like instrument for Apollo and some sort of flute for Pan.

In the fourth recitative, Mercury invites the judges to speak out: Tmolus begins, and sings an aria in favour of Apollo. Then Pan invites Midas to do the same, who, in his aria, declares Pan to be the victor. Where Midas sings about his ears, an instrumental donkey's bray resounds, prefiguring his punishment. Then follows a recitative in which all singers participate: Momus, Mercury, Tmolus and Phoebus reproach Midas his ill judgement. After a short plea for mercy, Phoebus and Mercury punish him with the ears of an ass. After Pan's and Midas's retorts Mercury sings his aria about whom earned the fool's cap. The last recitative is for Momus, who sends Midas to the woods, declaring he belongs in the company of those who judge too quickly, and invites Phoebus to song. The final chorus praises the sounds of strings, as belonging to the gods.

Movements of Der Streit zwischen Phoebus und Pan
#	Incipit	Movement	Signature		Scoring
1	Geschwinde, ihr wirbelnden Winde	Chorus	3/8	D major	tutti
2	Und du bist doch so unverschämt und frei	Recitative	common time		S BI BII
3	Patron, das macht der Wind!	Aria	2/4	G major	S
4	Was braucht ihr euch zu zanken?	Recitative	common time		A BI BII
5	Mit Verlangen drück ich deine zarten Wangen	Aria	3/8	B minor	BI TraI Oba Str(muted)
6	Pan, rücke deine Kehle nun	Recitative	common time		S BII
7	Zu Tanze, zu Sprunge	Aria	3/8	A major	BII VnI&II(in unison)
8	Nunmehro Richter her!	Recitative	common time		A TI
9	Phoebus, deine Melodei	Aria	12/8	F# minor	TI Oba
10	Komm, Midas, sage du nun an	Recitative	common time		TII BII
11	Pan ist Meister, lasst ihn gehn!	Aria	cut time	D major	TII VnI&II(in unison)
12	Wie, Midas, bist du toll?	Recitative	common time		S A TI TII BI BII
13	Aufgeblasne Hitze, aber wenig Grütze	Aria	3/4	E minor	A TraI TraII
14	Du guter Midas, geh nun hin	Recitative	common time		S Str
15	Labt das Herz, ihr holden Saiten	Chorus	2/4	D major	tutti

== Recordings ==
- J.S. Bach: Cantata BWV 201, Schwäbischer Singkreis Stuttgart / Ton-Studio Orchestra Stuttgart (1952)
- J.S. Bach: Kantate Nr. 201, Thomanerchor Leipzig / Gewandhausorchester Leipzig (1953)
- J.S. Bach: Cantata BWV 201, Moscow Conservatoire Chamber Orchestra (1987)
- J.S. Bach: Cantate Profanes, RIAS-Kammerchor / Akademie für Alte Musik Berlin / René Jacobs (Harmonia Mundi, 1995)
- J.S. Bach: Secular Cantatas, Musica Antiqua Köln / Reinhard Goebel (Archiv, 1997)
- Bach: Complete Cantatas, Vol. 4, Amsterdam Baroque Orchestra & Choir / Ton Koopman (Erato, 1997)
- J.S. Bach: Secular Cantatas, Vol. 9, Bach Collegium Japan / Masaaki Suzuki (BIS, 2017)

== Sources ==
- "D-B Mus.ms. Bach P 175". Bach Digital. Leipzig: Bach Archive; et al. 2020-01-16.
- Dellal, Pamela. "BWV 201 – "Geschwinde, ihr wirbelnden Winde" – Der Streit zwischen Phoebus und Pan – (The Contest between Phoebus and Pan)". Emmanuel Music. Boston.
- "Geschwinde, geschwinde, ihr wirbelnden Winde BWV 201". Bach Digital. Leipzig: Bach Archive; et al. 2019-03-11.
- Henrici, Christian Friedrich (1732). "LXVII. Der Streit zwischen Phoebus und Pan in einem Dramate ausgeführt" [67. The Contest between Phoebus and Pan performed as a drama]. Ernst-Schertzhaffte und Satÿrische Gedichte [Serious-jocular and satirical poetry]. Ernst-Schertzhaffte und Satyrische Gedichte (in German). Vol. III. Leipzig: Joh. Theod. Boetii Tochter. pp. 501–506.
- Möller, Martin (2014). "Secular Cantata BWV201". J. S. Bach Complete Edition: Liner notes, sung texts, full tracklist (PDF). Translated by Knoll, Mark. Brilliant Classics. p. 48. 94940.
- Moonen, Marie (2013). De Scheibe-Bach-controverse: Onpartijdige bemerkingen bij een passage in Johann Adolph Scheibes Critischer Musikus (PDF) (Thesis) (in Dutch). KU Leuven. Archived from the original (PDF) on 2023-04-09.
- Neumann, Werner, ed. (2013). "Geschwinde, ihr wirbelnden Winde BWV 201: Der Streit zwischen Phoebus und Pan" [Swift, you swirling winds BWV 201: The Contest between Phoebus and Pan]. Hochzeitskantaten und Weltliche Kantaten verschiedener Bestimmung [Wedding cantatas and secular cantatas for different occasions] (Score). New Bach Edition (in German). Vol. I/40 (3rd ed.). Bärenreiter. pp. 117–192. ISMN 9790006462025. BA 5031-01.
- Ovidius Naso, Publius (1922). "Midae aures: The Musical Contest of Pan and Apollo". Metamorphoses. Vol. XI. Translated by More, Brookes. Boston: Cornhill Publishing. Perseus Project.
- Richter, G., ed. (2018-09-09). "RUS-SPsc 6.35.1.410". Bach Digital. Leipzig: Bach Archive; et al.
- Rust, Wilhelm, ed. (1862). Joh. Seb. Bach's Kammermusik für Gesang: Erster Band [Joh. Seb. Bach's sung chamber music: First volume]. Johann Sebastian Bach's Werke (in German). Vol. 11. Bach Gesellschaft. Leipzig: Breitkopf & Härtel.
- Schabalina, Tatjana (2008). "Texte zur Music in Sankt Petersburg: Neue Quellen zur Leipziger Musikgeschichte sowie zur Kompositions- und Aufführungstätigkeit Johann Sebastian Bachs" [Texte zur Music in Saint Petersburg: New sources on Leipzig's music history, including on Johann Sebastian Bach's compositional and performatory practices]. In Wollny, Peter (ed.). Bach-Jahrbuch 2008 [Bach Yearbook 2008]. Bach-Jahrbuch (in German). Vol. 94. Neue Bachgesellschaft. Leipzig: Evangelische Verlagsanstalt. pp. 33–98. doi:10.13141/bjb.v2008. ISBN 978-3-374-02668-5. ISSN 0084-7682.
- Spitta, Philipp (1880). Johann Sebastian Bach (in German). Vol. II. Leipzig: Breitkopf & Härtel.
- Spitta, Philipp (1899). Johann Sebastian Bach: His Work and Influence on the Music of Germany, 1685–1750. Translated by Bell, Clara; Fuller Maitland, John Alexander. Novello & Co. – volume I – volume II – volume III
- Terry, Charles Sanford (1933). "X. The Secular Cantatas". The Music of Bach: An Introduction. London: Oxford University Press. pp. 97–104.
- Wolff, Christoph (2002). "Director of the Collegium Musicum and Royal Court Composer". Johann Sebastian Bach: The Learned Musician (paperback ed.). Oxford University Press. pp. 351–372. ISBN 0199248842.
