= Schwingt freudig euch empor, BWV 36 =

Church cantata by Johann Sebastian Bach

Schwingt freudig euch empor
- BWV 36
- Church cantata by J. S. Bach
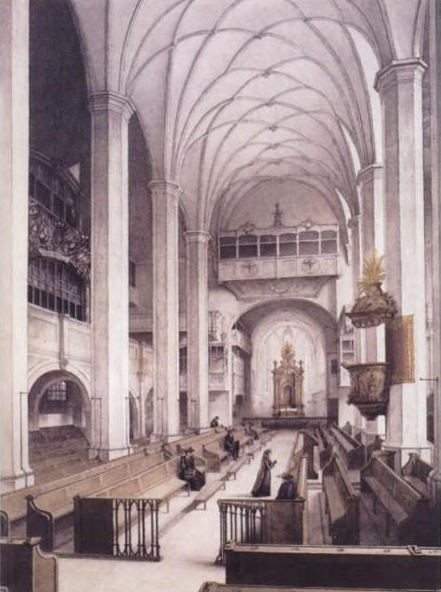
- Thomaskirche, Leipzig
- Related: based on BWV 36.1
- Occasion: First Sunday in Advent
- Cantata text: Picander?
- Chorale: "Nun komm, der Heiden Heiland"; "Wie schön leuchtet der Morgenstern"
- Performed: 2 December 1731: Leipzig
- Movements: 8
- Vocal: SATB choir and solo
- Instrumental: 2 oboes d'amore; 2 violins; viola; continuo

Johann Sebastian Bach composed the church cantata Schwingt freudig euch empor (Soar joyfully upwards), BWV 36, in Leipzig in 1731 for the first Sunday in Advent. He drew on material from previous congratulatory cantatas, beginning with Schwingt freudig euch empor, BWV 36.1 (1725). The Gospel for the Sunday was the Entry into Jerusalem, thus the mood of the secular work matched "the people's jubilant shouts of Hosanna". In a unique structure in Bach's cantatas, he interpolated four movements derived from the former works with four stanzas from two important Advent hymns, to add liturgical focus, three from Luther's "Nun komm, der Heiden Heiland" and one from Nicolai's "Wie schön leuchtet der Morgenstern". He first performed the cantata in its final form of two parts, eight movements, on 2 December 1731.

== History and words ==
Bach composed the cantata in 1731 in Leipzig, for the First Sunday of Advent, the beginning of the Lutheran church year. In Leipzig this was the only Sunday in Advent when a cantata was performed, whereas tempus clausum (quiet time) was observed on the other three Sundays. The prescribed readings for the Sunday were from the Epistle to the Romans, "night is advanced, day will come" (Romans 13:11–14), and from the Gospel of Matthew, the Entry into Jerusalem (Matthew 21:1–9).

Bach based parts of the music on a homage cantata of the same name, Schwingt freudig euch empor, BWV 36.1, which he had composed for the birthday of a Leipzig University teacher and first performed in spring 1725. The text was probably written by Picander, who modified it to a congratulatory cantata for Countess Charlotte Friederike Wilhelmine of Anhalt-Köthen, Steigt freudig in die Luft, BWV 36.2, first performed on 30 November 1726. Another version was a congratulatory cantata for a member of the Rivinius family from Leipzig, Die Freude reget sich, BWV 36.3, probably in 1735.

Bach transformed the secular music to a cantata for the first Sunday in Advent, first by combining four movements and simply adding a chorale, the final stanza of "Wie schön leuchtet der Morgenstern". The librettist of this adaptation, who stayed close to the secular cantata without reference to the readings, is unknown. Klaus Hofmann notes that the jubilant opening matches the Gospel of the entry into Jerusalem "with the people's jubilant shouts of Hosanna". The date of the adaptation is not certain, because the version is extant only in a copy by Bach's student Christoph Nichelmann.

Finally in 1731, Bach reworked the cantata considerably and wrote a new score. He interpolated the arias not with recitatives, but with three stanzas from Luther's hymn for Advent, "Nun komm, der Heiden Heiland". This main hymn for the first Sunday in Advent had already opened his cantata for the same occasion in 1714, Nun komm, der Heiden Heiland, BWV 61, and he had used it as the base for his chorale cantata Nun komm, der Heiden Heiland, BWV 62, in 1724. The hymn stanzas "serve to anchor the cantata to some extent in the Advent story, and to give it liturgical purpose and a clear focus". John Eliot Gardiner terms it "structurally unusual". Bach divided the cantata in two parts to be performed before and after the sermon, closing part I with a stanza from Nicolai's hymn. For context, he replaced stanza 7, which had closed the whole cantata, by stanza 6, and closed part II by the final stanza of Luther's hymn.

Bach first performed the cantata on 2 December 1731, one week after Wachet auf, ruft uns die Stimme, BWV 140.

== Scoring and structure ==
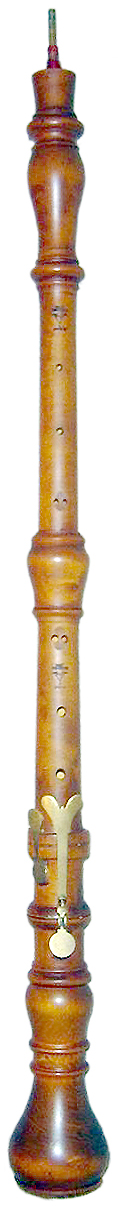
Baroque oboe d'amore

The cantata is scored for four soloists—soprano, alto, tenor and bass—a four-part choir, and a Baroque instrumental ensemble of two oboes d'amore, two violins, viola and basso continuo. It is structured in two parts of four movements each. Its interpolation of chorus and arias with chorales is unique in Bach's cantatas.

Movements of Schwingt freudig euch empor, Part 1, BWV 36
No.	Title	Type	Vocal	Winds	Strings	Key	Time
1	Schwingt freudig euch empor	Chorus	SATB	2ObDa	2Vl Va Bc	D major	3/4
2	Nun komm, der Heiden Heiland	Choral	Soprano, alto	1ObDa (col Soprano), 1 ObDa (coll'Alto)	Bc	F# minor	common time
3	Die Liebe zieht mit sanften Schritten	Aria	Tenor	1ObDa (solo)	Bc	B minor	3/8
4	Zwingt die Saiten in Cythara	Chorale	SATB	1ObDa (col Soprano), 1ObDa (coll'Alto)	1Vl (col Soprano), 1Vl (coll'Alto), Va (col Tenore), Bc	D major	common time

Movements of Schwingt freudig euch empor, Part 2, BWV 36
No.	Title	Type	Vocal	Winds	Strings	Key	Time
5	Willkommen, werter Schatz!	Aria	Bass		2Vl, Va, Bc	D major	common time
6	Der du bist dem Vater gleich	Choral	Tenor	2ObDa	Bc	B minor	3/4
7	Auch mit gedämpften, schwachen Stimmen	Aria	Soprano		1Vl (muted), Bc	G major	12/8
8	Lob sei Gott dem Vater ton	Chorale	SATB	1ObDa (col Soprano), 1ObDa (coll'Alto)	1Vl (col Soprano), 1Vl (coll'Alto), Va (col Tenore), Bc	B minor	common time

== Music ==
The cantata is unique in Bach's church cantatas in its structure of arias combined with chorale instead of recitatives. Performed one week after Wachet auf, ruft uns die Stimme, BWV 140, it shows Bach's emphasis on the chorale even beyond his second cycle of chorale cantatas, begun in 1724.

The opening chorus is opened by a ritornello, dominated by two contrasting motifs: the strings play a short rising figure in triplets, the oboes d'amore play an expansive melody. As in the secular model, the movement is in two similar parts, each consisting of two contrasting sections, "Schwingt freudig euch empor zu den erhabnen Sternen" (Soar joyfully upwards to the exalted stars) and "Doch haltet ein!" (Yet stop!). The bass voice, the lowest register, enters first, followed by the tenors, altos, and sopranos. This ascending sequence also reflects the text: "soaring aloft", literally "swinging upward".

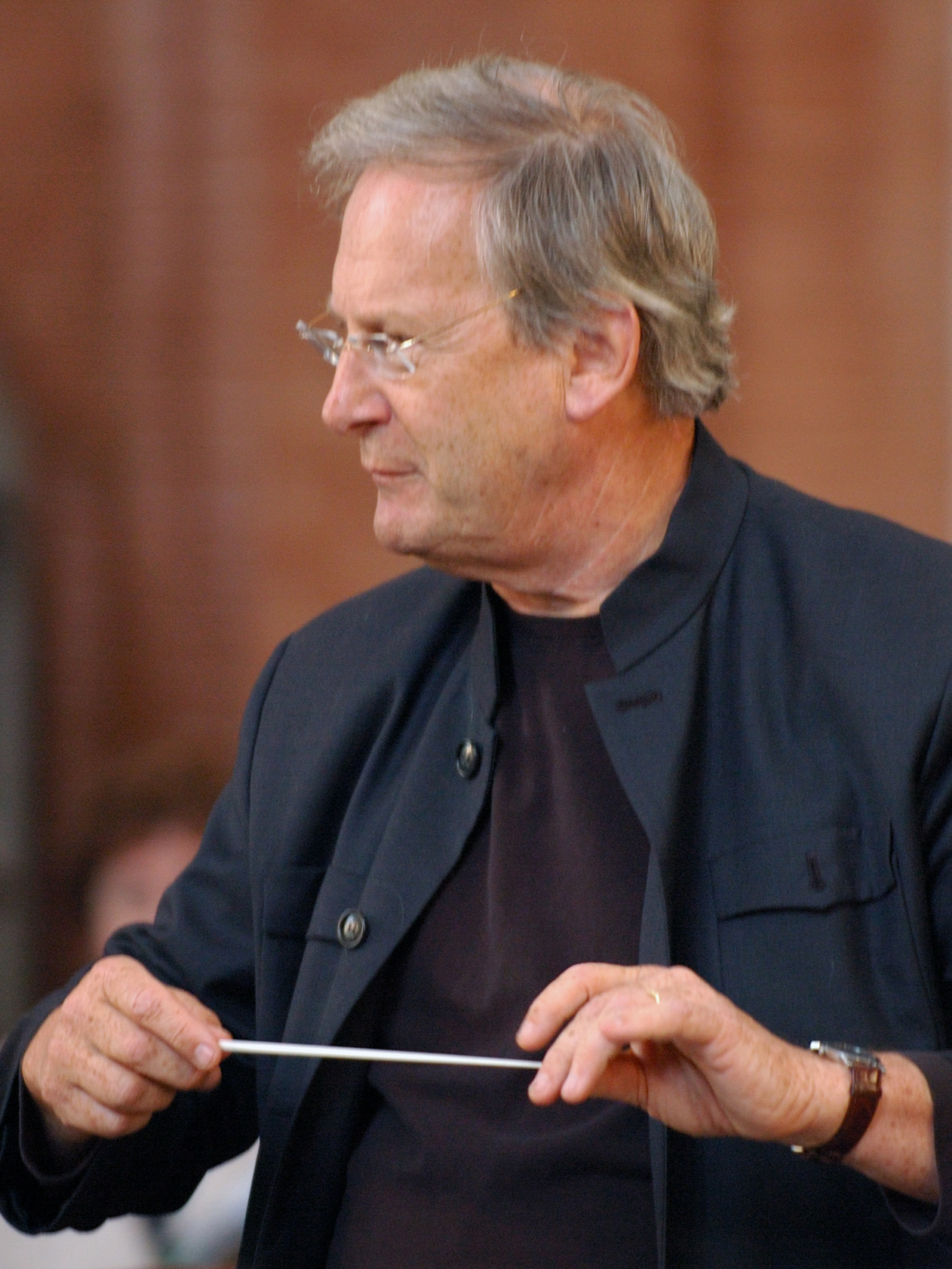
John Eliot Gardiner, 2007

Gardiner, who conducted the three cantatas for the first Sunday in Advent during the Bach Cantata Pilgrimage with the Monteverdi Choir in 2000, described the movement as a "spiritual madrigal – capricious, light-textured and deeply satisfying once all its virtuosic technical demands have been met: those tricky runs, divisions and chromatic intervals in all voices, and the chains of triplet figuration in the unison oboes d'amore and first violins". He compares the figures on "haltet ein!" (stop) in the middle section to "Wohin?" (where) in the aria "Eilt, eilt" in Bach's St John Passion.

All three settings of the stanzas from Luther's chorale are different, beginning with a duet for soprano and alto for the first stanza. The voices are doubled by the oboes d'amore and render the text in sections of different length, with sixteen measures for the final "Gott solch Geburt ihm bestellt" (that God had ordained such a birth for Him). Alfred Dürr notes the expressiveness of the music, especially in leaps of sixths on the urgent request "nun komm" (now come), syncopated rhythm on "des sich wundert alle Welt" (over whom the whole world marvels), and daring chromatic on the final line. The tenor aria reflects "Die Liebe zieht mit sanften Schritten" (Love approaches with gentle steps) with oboe d'amore as obbligato instrument, "the traditional musical symbol of love", alluding to the concept of Jesus as the bride-groom and the Soul as the bride, which is also the base for Nicolai's hymn that closes part I in a "rousing four-part harmonisation".

The bass aria beginning part II, "Willkommen, werter Schatz!" (Welcome, worthy treasure!) shows "echoes of the first movement" and avoids a regular da capo structure. The bass voice is the vox Christi, addressing the bride. The welcoming gesture from the secular cantata seems appropriate for the expressed sentiment. The next hymn stanza, "Der du bist dem Vater gleich" (You who are like the Father), the sixth stanza from Luther's hymn "dealing with the sins of the flesh and Christ's mission to redeem humankind", is marked "molt' allegro". The tenor sings the chorale melody unadorned as a cantus firmus, but the oboes d'amore play with "the urgent surging of semi-quaver activity". Dürr sees the expression of "Kampf und Sieg des Gottessohnes" (fight and victory of the Son of God) over "das krank Fleisch" (weak/sick flesh) of man. Gardiner compares it to a trio sonata movement. He terms the last aria "a berceuse of pure enchantment" and compares it to the "echo aria" from part IV of Bach's Christmas Oratorio. The text "Auch mit gedämpften, schwachen Stimmen" (Also with muted, weak voices) is illustrated by a muted (con sordino) solo violin. The closing choral, the final stanza of Luther's hymn, "Lob sei Gott dem Vater ton" (Praise be to God, the Father) is a four-part setting.

== Recordings ==
A list of recordings is provided by the Bach Cantatas Website. Choir with one voice per part (OVPP) and ensembles playing period instruments in historically informed performance are marked by green background.

Recordings of Schwingt freudig euch empor, BWV 36
Title	Conductor / Choir / Orchestra	Soloists	Label	Year	Choir type	Orch. type
Bach Made in Germany Vol. 1 – Cantatas I	Günther Ramin Thomanerchor Gewandhausorchester	Elisabeth Meinel-Asbahr; soloist of the Thomanerchor; Rolf Apreck; Johannes Oettel	Leipzig Classics	1952		
J. S. Bach: Cantatas BWV 36, BWV 64	Wilhelm Ehmann Westfälische Kantorei Deutsche Bachsolisten	Maria Friesenhausen; Andrea von Ramm; Johannes Feyerabend; Hartmut Ochs	Cantate	1969		
J. S. Bach: Das Kantatenwerk • Complete Cantatas • Les Cantates, Folge / Vol. 2	Nikolaus Harnoncourt: Wiener Sängerknaben; Chorus Viennensis; Concentus Musicus Wien	soloist of the Wiener Sängerknaben; Paul Esswood; Kurt Equiluz; Ruud van der Meer	Teldec	1974		Period
Bach Made in Germany Vol. 4 – Cantatas VIII	Hans-Joachim Rotzsch Thomanerchor Neues Bachisches Collegium Musicum	Arleen Auger; Peter Schreier; Siegfried Lorenz	Eterna	1981		
Die Bach Kantate Vol. 61	Helmuth Rilling Gächinger Kantorei Bach-Collegium Stuttgart	Arleen Auger; Gabriele Schreckenbach; Peter Schreier; Walter Heldwein	Hänssler	1982		
J. S. Bach: Advent Cantatas	John Eliot Gardiner Monteverdi Choir English Baroque Soloists	Nancy Argenta; Petra Lang; Anthony Rolfe Johnson; Olaf Bär	Archiv Produktion	1992		Period
J. S. Bach: Adventskantaten	Philippe Herreweghe Collegium Vocale Gent	Sibylla Rubens; Sarah Connolly; Christoph Prégardien; Peter Kooy	Harmonia Mundi	1996		Period
Bach Edition Vol. 14 – Cantatas Vol. 7	Pieter Jan Leusink Holland Boys Choir Netherlands Bach Collegium	Ruth Holton; Sytse Buwalda; Knut Schoch; Bas Ramselaar	Brilliant Classics	2000		Period
J. S. Bach: Complete Cantatas Vol. 18	Ton Koopman Amsterdam Baroque Orchestra & Choir	Sandrine Piau; Bogna Bartosz; James Gilchrist; Klaus Mertens	Antoine Marchand	2002		Period
J.S. Bach: Cantatas for the Complete Liturgical Year Vol. 9: "Nun komm, der Heiden Heiland" – Cantatas BWV 61 · 36 · 62 · 132	Sigiswald Kuijken La Petite Bande	Gerlinde Sämann; Petra Noskaiová; Christoph Genz; Jan van der Crabben	Accent	2008	OVPP	Period
Thomanerchor Leipzig – Das Kirchenjahr mit Bach, Vol. 1: Advent – Cantatas BWV 36, 61, 62	Georg Christoph Biller Thomanerchor Gewandhausorchester	soloists of the Thomanerchor; Christoph Genz; Andreas Scheibner	Rondeau Production	2009		
J. S. Bach: Cantatas Vol. 47	Masaaki Suzuki Bach Collegium Japan	Hana Blažíková; Robin Blaze; Satoshi Mizukoshi; Peter Kooy	BIS	2010		Period
