= Kindleinwiegen =

Custom for the nativity of Jesus

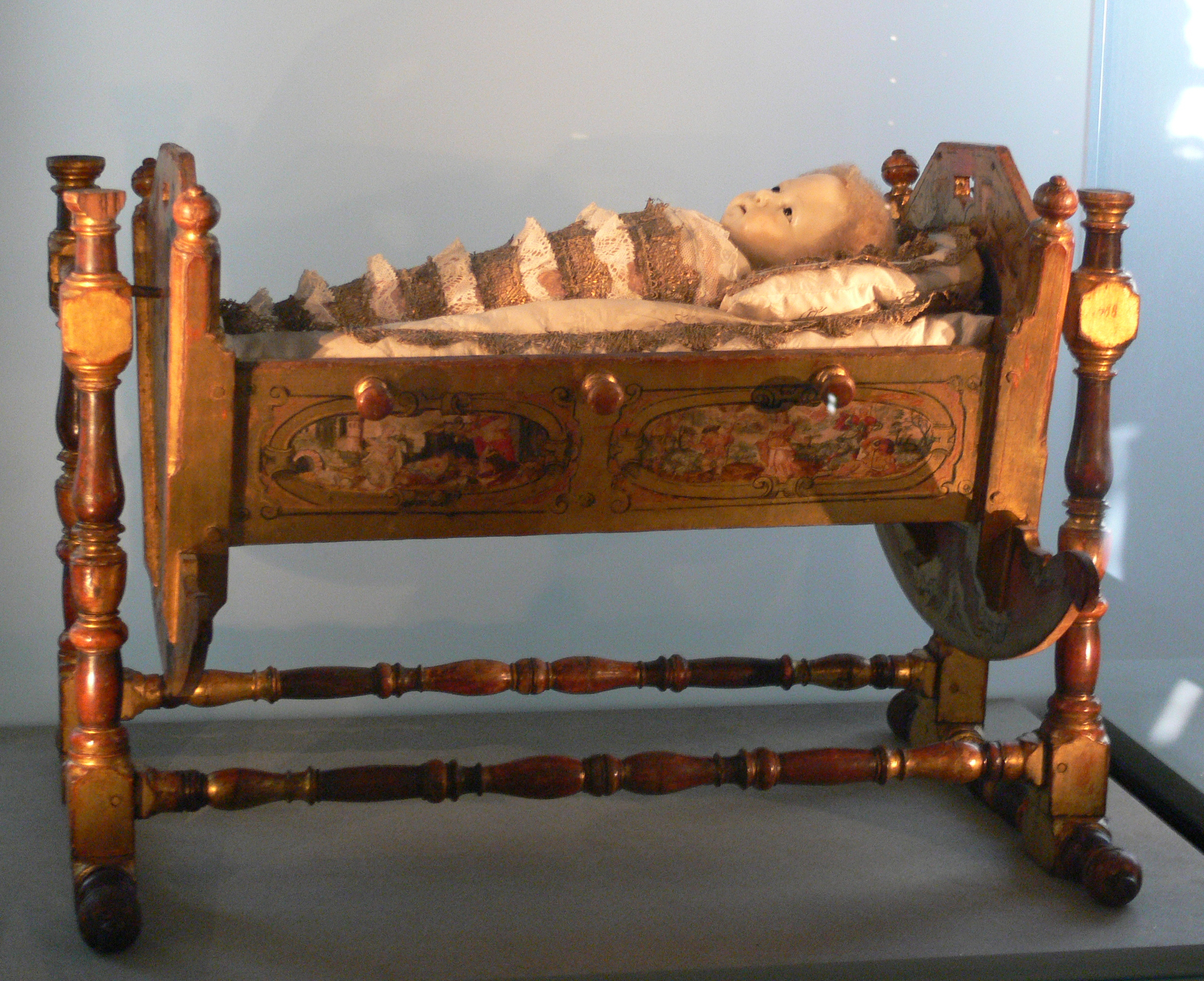
Crib used in the "Rocking the Christchild" drama-tradition (Southern Germany, ca. 1585)

Kindleinwiegen or Christkindlwiegen (Rocking the Christchild) is a tradition during the Nativity of Jesus celebrations which can be traced back to the liturgical dramas of the later medieval period. It is a tradition primarily from the German speaking parts of central Europe which appeared across the region in a variety of forms, chiefly though not exclusively, in monasteries and churches. It was at its most widespread between the fifteenth and nineteenth centuries, and survived more strongly in Roman Catholic regions than in those areas that switched to protestantism, following the interventions of Martin Luther and others.

The celebration involved a form of congregational dancing accompanied by singing around a picture of Jesus placed on a crib or adjacent altar. The performance was led by the priests, and the singing, at least initially, appears to have consisted of duet sung by two priests. The ceremony is still carried out, believed now to be uniquely, in the Church of St Mary of the Purification, Blidworth, Nottinghamshire, England, usually on the nearest Sunday to Candlemas, although if that Sunday falls in January it is usually enacted on the following Sunday, so that it is always the first Sunday in February. It was restored at Blidworth in 1922 so the service which took place on 6 February 2022 marked the centenary of its restoration.

== History ==
The first surviving record of a Kindelwiegenfeier appears in De investigatione Antichristi, produced in 1161/62 by Gerhoh of Reichersberg, provost of the Augustinian Cannons at Reichersberg Abbey in Upper Austria. According to Gerhoh's description, the location of the ceremony was a monastery church and the participants were monks or "secular" clerics. The ceremony consisted of the singing of several songs from the book of hours and other unspecified liturgical sources, enriched with various drama-actions by the participants. In later centuries a wider level of congregation participation became the norm.

=== Reformation ===
By the fifteenth century the custom had spread to practically all the churches in Germany. During the sixteenth century the more hardline protestant congregations began to reject it as one of the fruits of ("papist") superstition. Nevertheless, even in regions touched by the Protestant Reformation it took a long time for Christkindlwiegen to disappear entirely.

Bach biographer Philipp Spitta describes the customs regarding the Kindleinwiegen in Protestant Leipzig before and after the City Council formally abolished the practice in 1702. He starts with a comment on a hymn in German that also uses some Latin words (Virga Jesse floruit, as used by the Leipzig composers Johann Kuhnau and Bach for their Christmas compositions):

The Latin-German Christmas hymn ... is, in part at least, a lullaby sung at the cradle of Christ, and, since it was included by the Leipzig Cantor, Vopelius, in his Leipzig hymn book, it must have been in ordinary use there. It was an old Christian custom to place a manger in the church, and to perform the events of Christmas night as a drama or mystery. Boys represented the angels and proclaimed the birth of the Saviour, and then priests entered as the shepherds and drew near to the manger; others asked what they had seen there ...; they gave answer and sung a lullaby at the manger. Mary and Joseph were also represented: Mary asks Joseph to help her to rock the Child; he declares himself ready, and the shepherds sing a song. This custom of Kindleinwiegen, as it was called, ..., was in full force in the beginning of the [18th] century in Leipzig. It was one of the customs which the Council wished to abolish in the year 1702. ... their proposal met with but little favour ... This particular custom of Kindleinwiegen actually survived to Bach's day, for we find a lullaby in his Christmas Oratorio. ... the words put together by Kuhnau for a Christmas cantata and adopted by Bach reflect the simple old custom, still popular at that time in Leipzig, of representing dramatically in church the angelic message and the adoration of the shepherds; but in a more ideal way, being, as it were, its poetic and musical counterpart.

=== Counter-Reformation ===
There was throughout the centuries considerable variation concerning the details of the ceremony. Even in regions that remained staunchly catholic, as the Counter-Reformation took hold there was a reaction against some of the medieval jollity of the earlier celebrations, and the image of Jesus tended to be removed from the crib and placed instead on the altar, which was felt to be more respectful.

There was also increasingly use of "props" such as a Santa Claus doll to supervise proceedings. In another version, each of the young girls from the village dressed up and brought to church their own wax doll of the Baby Jesus. This provides a link to the Christmas nativity scene centred on the crib that became popular in the nineteenth century and remains a focus of Christmas decoration in many churches today. Another surviving link from the Christkindlwiegen custom is the Christmas song Joseph, lieber Joseph mein, still popular in German speaking areas, and believed to have originated as one of the songs that would have accompanied the old ceremony.

=== Revival ===
Although the Christkindlwiegen had generally fallen out of use by the start of the twentieth century, there have been revivals. On 7 January 2012 the Viennese medieval music expert Eberhard Kummer marked the 850th anniversary of the ceremony's first surviving recorded mention with a revival performance in St Gertrude's Church at Klosterneuburg, a short distance upstream of Vienna. Proceedings involved two altar girls rocking the "Christchild" in his crib, to the accompaniment of authentic dancing. The ceremony took place again at Klosterneuburg in January 2013 and January 2014.
