= Schwingt freudig euch empor, BWV 36c =

Secular cantata by Johann Sebastian Bach

Schwingt freudig euch empor (Soar joyfully aloft), BWV 36.1 (formerly BWV 36c), is a secular cantata by Johann Sebastian Bach. He composed it in Leipzig, most likely in 1725. There is evidence that the cantata was performed in April or May that year, and that it was re-staged six years later for the 40th birthday of Johann Matthias Gesner. Bach reused parts of the cantata in two other secular cantatas, and in a church cantata for the first Sunday in Advent, Schwingt freudig euch empor, BWV 36.

== History and text ==
Bach wrote several works for celebrations of the Leipzig University, Festmusiken zu Leipziger Universitätsfeiern. This cantata was originally probably composed as a homage to one of the composer's academic colleagues, but it is not known which. Johann Burckhard Mencke and Johann Heinrich Ernesti (the septuagenarian rector of the Thomasschule) have been suggested as possible recipients. The unmodified cantata was likely re-staged for Johann Matthias Gesner's 40th birthday (9 April 1731). Gesner had become rector at the Thomasschule in Leipzig in 1730 and had been acquainted with the composer since the 1710s when both worked in Weimar. Bach reworked this cantata in both secular and sacred versions:

- Secular cantatas:
  - Steigt freudig in die Luft, BWV 36.2 (composed before 30 November 1726)
  - Die Freude reget sich, BWV 36.3 (c. 1737-1738)
- Sacred cantata Schwingt freudig euch empor, BWV 36, in two versions:
  - BWV 36.4 (c. 1726-1730)
  - BWV 36.5 (2 December 1731)

The libretto is likely by Christian Friedrich Henrici (Picander), who published the Steigt freudig in die Luft version of the text in 1727, as a cantata for the birthday of the duchess of Anhalt-Köthen, which fell on 30 November. The duchess's birthday cantata was set by Bach (in 1726 or earlier), but the music is lost.

== Scoring and structure ==
The cantata is scored for three soloists—soprano, tenor and bass—a four-part choir, two oboes d'amore, two violins, viola, viola d'amore and basso continuo.

1. Coro: Schwingt freudig euch empor
2. Recitative (tenor): Ein Herz, in zärtlichem Empfinden
3. Aria (tenor): Die Liebe führt mit sanften Schritten
4. Recitative (bass): Du bist es ja
5. Aria (bass): Der Tag, der dich vordem gebar
6. Recitative (soprano): Nur dieses Einz'ge sorgen wir
7. Aria (soprano): Auch mit gedämpften, schwachen Stimmen
8. Recitative (tenor): Bei solchen freudenvollen Stunden
9. Chorus & Recitatives (soprano, tenor, bass): Wie die Jahre sich verneuen

== Music ==
The opening chorus is a "jolly" gavotte form, highlighting the oboe d'amore (which is also important in introducing the third movement). The recitatives are all secco and fairly short, with the tenor recitative being only six measures long.

== Recordings ==
- Bach made in Germany Vol. VII – Secular Cantatas I, Peter Schreier, Berliner Solisten, Kammerorchester Berlin, Edith Mathis, Peter Schreier, Siegfried Lorenz, Eterna
- Edition Bachakademie Vol. 139 – Congratulatory and Hommage Cantatas, Helmuth Rilling, Gächinger Kantorei, Bach-Collegium Stuttgart, Eva Oltiványi, Marcus Ullmann, Andreas Schmidt, Hänssler
- J.S. Bach: Kantate Nr. 36c, Kurt Thomas, Thomanerchor, Gewandhausorchester, Adele Stolte, Hans-Joachim Rotzsch, Theo Adam, Eterna
- J.S. Bach: Weltliche Kantaten · Secular Cantatas · Cantates Profanes, Reinhard Goebel, Ex Tempore, Musica Antiqua Köln, Dorothea Röschmann, Axel Köhler, Christoph Genz, Hans-Georg Wimmer. Archiv Produktion
- J.S. Bach: Secular Cantatas Vol. 3, Masaaki Suzuki, Bach Collegium Japan, Joanne Lunn, Hiroya Aoki, Makoto Sakurada, Roderick Williams, BIS 2013
