= Arthur Prüfer =

German musicologist (1860–1944)

Hermann Bernhard Arthur Prüfer (7 July 1860, Leipzig – 3 June 1944, Würzburg) was a German musicologist. He was a son of a businessman and later studied musicology in Leipzig and Berlin, especially under Philipp Spitta. Prüfer was the musicology instructor for the Polish composer and conductor, Mateusz Gliński, during his teachings the Leipzig Conservatory. As a musicologist, his noticeable contribution was the 1909 publication, the Work of Bayreuth (Das Werk von Bayreuth), that contains thoughts and ideas through the musical compositions by Richard Wagner.

== Bibliography ==
- Untersuchungen über den ausserkirchlichen Kunstgesang in den evangelischen Schulen des 16. Jahrhunderts. Dissertation Leipzig 1890.
- Johann Hermann Schein, 1895 (Reprint 1989, ISBN 3-7618-0936-0)
- Johann Hermann Schein und das weltliche Lied des 17. Jahrhunderts, 1903
- Das Werk von Bayreuth (Sammlung von Vorträgen über die Bayreuther Festspiele), 1909
- Musik als tönende Faust-Idee, 1920
- Die Meistersinger von Nürnberg in 3 Aufzügen (Vollständige Dichtung mit einer Einführung in das Werk), 1926
- Einführung in Richard Wagners Lohengrin, 2 editions 1937
