= Midori Seiler =

German-Japanese violinist (born 1969)

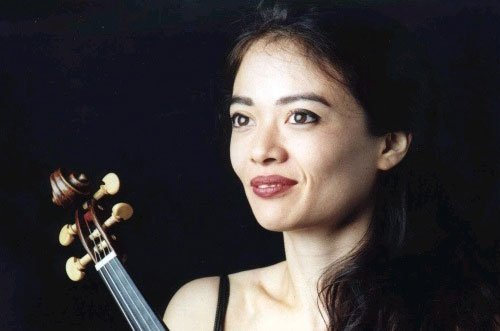
Midori Seiler in 2016

Midori Seiler (born 18 February 1969 in Osaka) is a German-Japanese violinist, specialising in baroque and classical music.

== Life and career ==
Midori Seiler is the daughter of a Japanese pianist and a Bavarian pianist. She grew up in Salzburg, where she began her music studies with Helmut Zehetmair and Sándor Végh. Further stages of her training took her to Switzerland to the Basler Adelina Oprean and the Schola Cantorum Basiliensis with Thomas Hengelbrock, to London with David Takeno and finally to Berlin, where she completed her studies with a concert exam under Eberhard Feltz.

During her time in Basel, she became concertmaster of the Swiss Youth Symphony Orchestra. Since 1991 she has been a member of the Akademie für Alte Musik Berlin (Akamus), a prestigious European baroque orchestra. Her recording of the seven great Viennese violin sonatas by Mozart for the French label Zig Zag was awarded the Diapason d'or of 2002 and the Choc de Classica award.

Seiler has performed violin concertos of the baroque and classical repertoire with the Akamus as well as with Anima Eterna, the orchestra of the Belgian fortepiano specialist Jos van Immerseel, at the Wigmore Hall London, the Concertgebouw (Amsterdam) Amsterdam, the Musikvereinssaal in Vienna and in many other European cities.

She led master classes in Bruges and Antwerp and was professor of Baroque violin and viola at the University of Music Franz Liszt Weimar from 2010 to 2013, and taught at the Mozarteum University Salzburg from 2014, returning to Weimar in 2017. Since April 2020, she has been teaching at the Folkwang University of the Arts in Essen.

From 2025 she is to take over the artistic direction of the Early Music Festival for the Centre for Early Music in Cologne.

== Awards ==
- 2002: Diapason d'or for her "Vienna Violin Sonatas" by Mozart
- 2002: Choc du Monde de la Musique by Classica
- Prize of the Locatelli Competition at the Amsterdam Concertgebouw

== Discography (selection) ==
- "Georg Philipp Telemann." Christus-Kirche Berlin-Oberschöneweide. With Harmonia Mundi/Lotus, 2001.
- Lust & Leben um 1700. With her Boreas Ensemble. On the Berlin label KammerTon, 1999.
- Johann Sebastian Bach: 4th Brandenburg Concerto. On Harmonia Mundi France
- Franz Schubert: Sonatas for violin and pianoforte. With Jos van Immerseel
