= Die Freude reget sich, BWV 36b =

1735 cantata by Johann Sebastian Bach

Die Freude reget sich
- BWV: 36.3; 36b
- Secular cantata by J. S. Bach
- Related: Schwingt freudig euch empor, BWV 36.1
- Composed: 1739?
- Vocal: SATB choir and solo
- Instrumental: 2 oboes d'amore; 2 violins; viola; continuo

Die Freude reget sich (Joy awakens), BWV 36.3, BWV 36b), is a secular cantata composed by Johann Sebastian Bach. The work appears to date from 1738–1740, when Bach was living in Leipzig. Bach drew on material he had composed more than a decade earlier for the cantata Schwingt freudig euch empor, BWV 36.1.

== History and text ==
Bach wrote several works for celebrations of the Leipzig University, Festmusiken zu Leipziger Universitätsfeiern. The text pays homage to Johann Florenz Rivinius, who was appointed Rector of Leipzig University in October 1735, and the cantata was likely written for his ceremonial appointment as the highest-ranking professor of the Faculty of Law at the University of Leipzig in May 1739.

In 1727 Christian Friedrich Henrici (Picander) had published an earlier version of the text, the birthday cantata Steigt freudig in die Luft, BWW 36.2, which was also set by Bach. Picander was probably the author of the adaptation for the university celebration.

== Scoring and structure ==
The cantata is scored for four soloists, soprano, alto, tenor and bass, a four-part choir, flauto traverso, two oboes d'amore, two violins, viola and basso continuo.

1. Chorus: Die Freude reget sich
2. Recitative (tenor): Ihr seht, wie sich das Glücke
3. Aria (tenor): Aus Gottes milden Vaterhänden
4. Recitative (alto): Die Freunde sind vergnügt
5. Aria (alto): Das Gute, das dein Gott beschert
6. Recitative (soprano): Wenn sich die Welt mit deinem Ruhme trägt
7. Aria (soprano): Auch mit gedämpften, schwachen Stimmen
8. Chorus and recitative (tenor, alto, soprano): Was wir dir vor Glücke gönnen

== Music ==
As in BWV 36.1, the first movement is cheerful in nature, and the tenor aria includes a significant oboe d'amore line. The final movement is a "jolly chorus with interpolated recitative".

There are also related sacred cantatas, two versions of the church cantata for the First Sunday in Advent, Schwingt freudig euch empor, BWV 36.

The cantata is unusual in being a secular work which was parodied as a sacred work and then, some five years later again as a secular work. Bach's parodies are usually secular to sacred rather than sacred to secular. The explanation given for the prevalence of secular to sacred parodies is that occasional secular works such as birthday cantatas had a single use and then Bach was able to reuse them as sacred works.

== Recordings ==
- Bach Kantaten, Wolfgang Unger, Leipziger Universitätschor, Pauliner Barockensemble, Linda Perillo, Matthias Koch, Nils Giesecke, Thorofon
- Edition Bachakademie Vol. 139 – Congratulatory and Hommage Cantatas, Helmuth Rilling, Gächinger Kantorei, Bach-Collegium Stuttgart, Christiane Oelze, Ingeborg Danz, Marcus Ullmann, Hänssler

== Sources ==
Scores

- Die Freude reget sich, BWV 36b: Scores at the International Music Score Library Project

General

- Cantata BWV 36b Die Freude reget sich history, scoring, sources for text and music, translations to various languages, discography, discussion, Bach Cantatas Website
- BWV 36b Die Freude reget sich English translation, University of Vermont
- BWV 36b Die Freude reget sich text, scoring, University of Alberta
