= Lars Ulrik Mortensen =

Danish harpsichordist and conductor (born 1955)

- Born: 9 November 1955 (age 70); Esbjerg, Denmark
- Genres: Early music, Baroque music
- Occupations: Artistic director, conductor, musician
- Instrument: Harpsichord

Lars Ulrik Mortensen (born 9 November 1955) is a Danish harpsichordist and conductor, mainly of Baroque solo music, chamber music and early music repertory. He was a professor in Munich in 1996–99 and has since then been artistic director of Concerto Copenhagen. He received the Léonie Sonning Music Prize in 2007.

== Early life and education ==
Lars Ulrik Mortensen was born in Esbjerg, Denmark. His father was the conductor Bent Mortensen. He studied with Karen Englund (harpsichord) and Jesper Bøje Christensen (figured bass) at The Royal Danish Academy of Music in Copenhagen and with Trevor Pinnock in London.

== Career ==
He has a career as a soloist and chamber musician in Europe, North and South America and Japan. From 1988 to 1990 he was harpsichordist in London Baroque, and from 1990 to 1993 he was a member of Collegium Musicum 90. He appears regularly with singer Emma Kirkby, violinist John Holloway and cellist and gambist Jaap ter Linden. He has recorded for Archiv Produktion (3rd harpsichord in Bach's 3- and 4-harpsichord concerti with The English Concert), harmonia mundi, Kontrapunkt and da capo and his recording of Bach's Goldberg Variations won him a Diapason d'Or. He is the artistic director of Concerto Copenhagen, and appears regularly directing opera at the Royal Theatre in Copenhagen. He is also the artistic director of the European Union Baroque Orchestra since 2004.

He was professor of harpsichord and performance practice at the Hochschule für Musik und Theater in Munich from 1996 to 1999. In 2007 he was awarded the Léonie Sonning Music Prize, Denmark's premier music award.

== Recordings ==
- Dietrich Buxtehude (chamber music)

"Buxtehude – Seven Sonatas, Op.1" (1994, Dacapo)
"Buxtehude – Seven Trio Sonatas, Op.2" (1994, Dacapo)
"Buxtehude – Six Sonatas" (1994, Dacapo)

- Dietrich Buxtehude (solo works)

"Dietrich Buxtehude – Harpsichord Music, Vol. 1" (1998, Dacapo)
"Dietrich Buxtehude – Harpsichord Music, Vol. 2" (1998, Dacapo)
"Dietrich Buxtehude – Harpsichord Music, Vol. 3" (1998, Dacapo)

- Dietrich Buxtehude (Vocal music)

"Dietrich Buxtehude – Vocal Music, Vol.1" (1996, Dacapo)

- Georg Philipp Telemann (Flute sonatas with accompaniment)

"Telemann: 6 Recorder Sonatas" (Kontrapunkt)

- Johann Adolph Scheibe, Martin Ræhs (flute Sonatas with accompaniment)

"Flute Sonatas" (2002, Dacapo)

- Johann Jacob Froberger (Solo works for cembalo)

"Johann Jacob Froberger – Harpsichord Music" (1990, Kontrapunkt)

- Johann Sebastian Bach (Solo works for cembalo)

"Bach: 8 suites in French style, BWV 812–819" (2005, Kontrapunkt)
"Bach: Clavierübung Zweiter Teil" (2005, Kontrapunkt)
"Bach: Goldberg Variations" (2005, Kontrapunkt)
