= Concerto Copenhagen =

Danish baroque orchestra

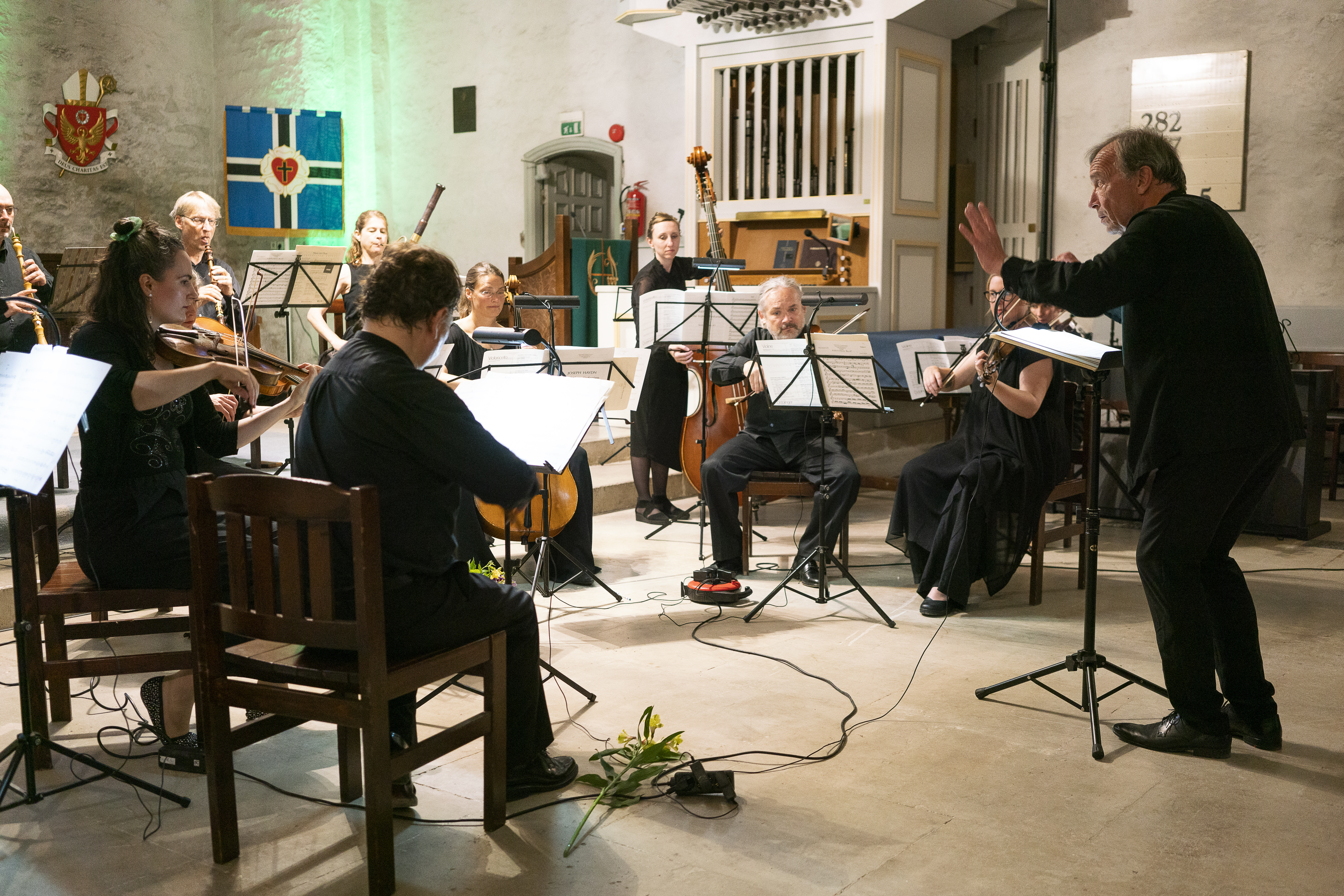
Concerto Copenhagen in Haapsalu Early Music Festival 2022

The Danish national baroque orchestra Concerto Copenhagen is one of the leading baroque orchestras in the world. The group debuted in 1991 and is supported by the Danish Arts Foundation. Since 1999 the orchestra has been directed by harpsichordist Lars Ulrik Mortensen.

== History ==
Danish National Baroque Orchestra Concerto Copenhagen played its first concerts in 1991 and has since developed into the leading baroque orchestra in Scandinavia.

The orchestra combines a repertoire of well known European music and lesser known works of Scandinavian origin.

Through the years Concerto Copenhagen has collaborated with many international artist like Emma Kirkby, Andreas Scholl, Anne Sofie von Otter, Sonia Prina, Vivica Genaux, Andrew Manze, Andrew Lawrence-King, Reinhard Goebel, Ronald Brautigam, Jordi Savall and Alfredo Bernardini. Between 2015 and 2017, Danish composer Karl Aage Rasmussen was linked to Concerto Copenhagen as composer-in-residence.

Concerto Copenhagen has released recordings on CPO, Deutsche Grammophon and BIS, as well as DVD productions on Harmonia Mundi and Decca.

The orchestra has toured USA, Japan, Brazil, Mexico, Australia and China.

== Discography ==
- J.S.Bach: The Overtures - original versions (CPO, 2021)
- K.AA. Rasmussen: The Four Seasons After Vivaldi (Dacapo, 2019)
- J.S. Bach: Brandenburg Concertos (CPO, 2018)
- Bo Holten: Gesualdo - Shadows (Dacapo, 2018)
- N.W. Gade: The Elf King's Daughter (Dacapo, 2018)
- J.S. Bach: Harpsichord Concertos Vol. 3 (CPO, 2015)
- J.S. Bach: Mass in B Minor (CPO, 2015)
- J.S. Bach: Violin Concertos BWV 1041–1043 & 1060R (CPO, 2014)
- G.F. Händel: Concerti Grossi, Op. 3 Nos. 1–6 (CPO, 2010)
- G.F. Händel: Partenope (Decca, 2009)
- J.S. Bach: Vocal Works (Deutsche Grammophon, 2009)
- G.F. Händel: Giulio Cesare (Harmonia Mundi, 2007)
- J.G.W. Palschau, J.A.P. Schulz: Harpsichord Concertos (Dacapo, 2007)
- J.S. Bach: Harpsichord Concertos Vol 2. (CPO, 2006)
- G. Gerson, F.L.Æ. Kunzen: Symphonies (CPO, 2005)
- J. Haydn: Keyboard Concertos (BIS, 2004)
- J.S. Bach: Harpsichord Concertos Vol. 1 (CPO, 2003)
- J.E. Hartmann: Complete Symphonies (CPO, 2003)
- C.E.F. Weyse: Symphonies 1 & 7 (Classico, 2002)
- J.A. Scheibe: Sinfonias (Chandos, 1994)
- Scheibe, Agrell & Hasse: Flute Concertos (Chandos, 1993)

== External references ==
- Concerto Copenhagens hjemmeside
- Concerto Copenhagen på Facebook
