= Steigt freudig in die Luft, BWV 36a =

Lost secular cantata by Johann Sebastian Bach

Steigt freudig in die Luft (Soar joyfully in the air), BWV 36.2 (formerly BWV 36a), is a lost secular cantata by Johann Sebastian Bach. He composed it in Leipzig and first performed it in Köthen on 30 November 1726.

== History and text ==
Bach composed the cantata while living in Leipzig. He retained a role as court composer to Leopold, Prince of Anhalt-Köthen, for whom he had worked full-time in the period 1717–1723. The cantata was written for the 24th birthday of the prince's second wife, Princess Charlotte Friederike Amalie of Nassau-Siegen on 30 November 1726, the date of the work's premiere.

The text, divided into nine movements, is by Christian Friedrich Henrici (Picander), who published it in his Ernst-Schertzhaffte und Satyrische Gedichte, Teil I of 1727. The text is adapted from an earlier congratulatory cantata, presumably authored by Picander, for which Bach's music survives.

1. Aria: Steigt freudig in die Lufft zu den erhabnen Höhen
2. Recitative: Durchlauchtigste
3. Aria: Die Sonne zieht mit sanfften Triebe
4. Recitative: Die Danckbarkeit
5. Aria: Sey uns willkommen, schönster Tag!
6. Recitative: Wiewohl das ist noch nicht genung
7. Aria: Auch mit gedämpfften schwachen Stimmen
8. Recitative: Doch ehe wir
9. Aria: Grüne, blühe, lebe lange

== Scoring and structure ==
Although the cantata is lost, we have some idea of what it sounded like. When Bach wrote for a one-off occasion such as a birthday, he sometimes recycled the music in another composition. In this case there appear to be several related works. The numbering of Steigt freudig in die Luft in the standard catalogue of Bach's works, the Bach-Werke-Verzeichnis, reflects a presumed relationship to extant cantatas, which use variants of Picander's celebratory text:

- the secular cantata Schwingt freudig euch empor, BWV 36.1 (performed in Leipzig, probably in 1725 a year before the Kothen version),
- the secular cantata Die Freude reget sich, BWV 36.3 (c. 1737-1738)
- two versions of the church cantata for the first Sunday in Advent, Schwingt freudig euch empor, BWV 36.

The extant cantatas use woodwinds and strings, and it is possible that the lost cantata was similarly scored, although the court's permanent band had been reduced since the time Bach was based at Köthen; he may have had fewer instrumentalists at his disposal than at Leipzig.

The piece has been reconstructed by Alexander Ferdinand Grychtolik, who has worked on other lost works by Bach such as Klagt, Kinder, klagt es aller Welt, BWV 244a. Grychtolik adapted the music from Schwingt freudig euch empor, BWV 36c and composed new recitatives. He performed his reconstruction at Köthen's Bach Festival in 2012, and released a recording (see recordings section below).

== Recordings ==
- Mitteldeutsche Hofmusik, Alexander Grychtolik. Ruhm und Glück. Rondeau, 2012. This album takes its title from the other work recorded, the birthday cantata of 1718, Der Himmel dacht auf Anhalts Ruhm und Glück, BWV 66a.

== Sources ==
Scores

- Steigt freudig in die Luft, BWV 36a: Scores at the International Music Score Library Project

General

- Cantata BWV 36a Steigt freudig in die Luft: history, scoring, sources for text and music, translations to various languages, discography, discussion, Bach Cantatas Website
- Steigt freudig in die Luft: history, scoring, Bach website (in German)
- BWV 36a Steigt freudig in die Luft: English translation, University of Vermont
- BWV 36a Steigt freudig in die Luft: text, scoring, University of Alberta (in German)
