= Spitta's Johann Sebastian Bach =

1873 biography by Philipp Spitta

Johann Sebastian Bach is a 19th-century biography of Johann Sebastian Bach by Philipp Spitta. The work was published in German in two volumes, in 1873 and 1880 respectively.

The English translation by Clara Bell and J. A. Fuller Maitland, Johann Sebastian Bach: His Work and Influence on the Music of Germany, 1685–1750, was published by Novello & Co in three volumes.

== Content and style ==
Spitta's Bach biography gives a chronological account. This includes the discussion of Bach's compositions: these are discussed within the chronological account at the time they were composed. Only for the sixth and last part, covering the last decennia of the Leipzig period, some compositions are grouped by type in subsections.

Spitta writes in long paragraphs and very few divisions in subsections. Coming from a Protestant background himself, he is able, like Albert Schweitzer after him, to give insight into the religious context of Bach's time.

Content of Spitta's Johann Sebastian Bach
German edition (3rd print: Breitkopf & Härtel 1921)			English edition (Novello & Co 1899)		
Vol.	pp.	Title	Vol.	pp.	Title
Preface
1	v–xx	Vorwort	1	i-xiv	Preface
Books
1	1–175	I. Die Forfahren	1	1–178	I. Bach's Ancestors
1	177–328	II. Kindheit und Ausbildungsjahre (1685–1707)	1	179–331	II. The Childhood and Early Years of Johann Sebastian Bach, 1685–1707
1	329–610	III. Erstes Jahrzehnt der Meisterschaft (1707–1717)	1	333–620	III. The First Ten Years of Bach's "Mastership"
1	611–784	IV. Cöthen (1717–1723)	2	1–178	IV. Cöthen, 1717–1723
2	1–479	V. Leipziger Jahre von 1723–1734	2	179–648	V. Leipzig, 1723–1734
2	481–763	VI. Die letzte Lebensperiode (1734–1750)	3	1–278	VI. The Final Period of Bach's Life and Work
Endnotes
1	787–846	Anhang A. Kritische Ausführungen	1	621–656	Appendix (A, to Vol. I)
1	787–846	Anhang A. Kritische Ausführungen	2	649–721	Appendix (A, to Vol. II)
2	767–846	Anhang A. Kritische Ausführungen	2	649–721	Appendix (A, to Vol. II)
2	767–846	Anhang A. Kritische Ausführungen	3	279–295	Appendix (A, to Vol. III)
Additional material
1	847–855	Anhang B. Mittheilungen aus den Quellen und Ergänzungen	3	296–360	Appendix B
2	847–978	Anhang B. Mittheilungen aus den Quellen	3	296–360	Appendix B
Errata			Translator's Postscript		
1	856	Berichtigungen	1	xv–xvi	Translator's Postscript
2	979-995	Nachträge und Berichtigungen	1	xv–xvi	Translator's Postscript
Index
2	996–1014	Namen- und Sachregister	3	407–419	Index
Musical supplement
1	5 pp.	Musikbeilagen	3	363–405	Musical Supplement
2	20 pp.	Musikbeilagen	3	363–405	Musical Supplement

== Significance for Bach studies ==
Spitta's biography went down in history as "... the most ... comprehensive and important single work on Johann Sebastian Bach". For over a hundred years after its publication biographers rarely revisited primary sources, they just took the facts from Spitta's work. Only by the late 20th century criticisms about Spitta's accuracy and interpretation were raised.

=== Spitta and prior Bach biography ===
Spitta blew the competition away, leaving only a small place for Bach's Nekrolog, and Johann Nikolaus Forkel's Ueber Johann Sebastian Bachs Leben, Kunst und Kunstwerke. Especially Karl Hermann Bitter's comprehensive Bach biography, published a few years before Spitta's, all but disappeared in the folds of history.

=== Spitta and later Bach scholarship ===
Until the late 20th century Spitta was regarded as an unquestionable authority. All later Bach biographers almost exclusively relied on Spitta for the basic facts of Bach's life. When Spitta had analysed a primary source it was largely deemed unnecessary to revisit it. It took quarter of a century after Spitta before Charles Sanford Terry was able to add some new biographical material to a Bach biography.

Also Spitta's interpretations were taken for granted: for example when Spitta gives little attention to Bach's planned competition with Louis Marchand (from which Marchand withdrew), a central anecdote in the Nekrolog, biographers after Spitta would do the same. Spitta's method of description, analysis and interpretation of source material became the new standard for Bach scholarship.

Papers on specific aspects of Bach's life or compositions invariably go from the assumption the reader is familiar with what Spitta wrote on the topic. For example, when such paper mentions Kindleinwiegen the concept is hardly ever explained, while it is assumed to be background knowledge from Spitta's treatment of the topic.

Even more popular descriptions of Bach's life and works carry Spitta's hallmark. For example, Bach's Magnificat is most often recorded without the Christmas interpolations, but liner notes accompanying such recordings will often give a detailed description of these interpolations, following Spitta's model of the description of the Magnificat.

=== Critical reassessment ===
Spitta's comprehensiveness and thoroughness made it difficult to come up with a competing view on any aspect of Bach's life or work. Biographers and scholars were hardly able to add something new to the vision on Bach's life and work as laid down in Spitta's biography. Apart from an occasional side-remark, like a 1952 comment that Spitta hadn't done much justice to Bitter, substantial criticism was not heard before the late 20th century.

==== Accuracy ====
A major development from the late 20th century is that high quality facsimiles of all kinds of primary sources regarding Johann Sebastian Bach became more readily available. Not only in print, like a new edition in color of Bach's autograph of the St Matthew Passion, but also online, like the Bach digital resource making hundreds of manuscripts, scores as well as writings, available at very high resolutions. It was no longer necessary to gain access to protected archived sources to make a detailed comparison between Spitta's writings and the artefacts he commented upon.

Occasionally re-evaluations of source material led to new insights. For example, Spitta wrote about the Magnificat that it was composed in the quiet time of Advent 1723. Later biographers repeated that without questioning, until in 2003 Andreas Glöckner published a new study about the first version of the Magnificat arguing that it was much more likely Bach had composed the Magnificat half a year earlier, in the first month of his tenure in Leipzig. The overpowering authority of Spitta can be seen from a number of authors who still keep to Spitta's chronology after the publication of Glöckner's paper.

==== Bach's character ====
From Spitta's biography Bach's character is evaluated rather negatively: choleric, aggressive, narrow-minded about a broader cultural context, religiously bigoted, stuck in an obsolete contrapuntal style, depressed with a negative impact on his output in the last years of his life, lacking modesty, frustrated about his presumed lack of success, in short, a man impossible to get along with. That image was reinforced by later biographers who kept to Spitta's analysis of, for example, Bach's attitude in his conflict with Johann August Ernesti. In the description of such conflicts Spitta is generally more understanding towards Bach's counterparts than towards the composer. This aspect of Spitta's writing received its first serious criticism in Klaus Eidam's 1999 Bach biography. This biographer gave more credence to the short character sketch in the Nekrolog that speaks about the moderation (Redlichkeit) of Bach's character, as testified by his friends and those who knew him. Eidam takes a new look at known and previously unmentioned sources from this perspective and finds support for his analysis there. He uncovers a Bach broadly acclaimed in his own time, composing without interruption when confronted with bigotry and well-aware of what was going on in cultural life.

== Sources ==
- Klaus Eidam. Das wahre Leben des Johann Sebastian Bach. Piper, 1999. ISBN 3492040799
  - Translated as The True Life of Johann Sebastian Bach. New York: Basic Books, 2001. ISBN 9780465018611
- Philipp Spitta. Johann Sebastian Bach.
  - Erster Band (Book I–IV). Leipzig: Breitkopf & Härtel. 1873.
    - Third print (1921) at Archive.org
  - Zweiter Band (Book V–VI). Leipzig: Breitkopf & Härtel. 1880.
    - Third print (1921) at Archive.org
  - Johann Sebastian Bach: His Work and Influence on the Music of Germany, 1685–1750 in three volumes. Translated by Clara Bell and J. A. Fuller Maitland. Novello & Co. 1884–1885.
    - 1899 edition: Vol. 1 (Book I–III) – Vol. 2 (Book IV–V) – Vol. 3 (Book VI) at Archive.org
    - 1992 republication of the 1952 Dover edition (with "Bibliographical Note" by Saul Novack): Vol. 1 (Book I–III)
