= Max Seiffert =

German musicologist (1868–1948)

Maximilian Seiffert (9 February 1868 – 15 April 1948) was a German musicologist and editor of Baroque music.

== Biography ==
Seiffert was born in Beeskow an der Spree, Kingdom of Prussia, the son of a teacher. He was first educated at the Joachimsthal Gymnasium, in Berlin, where he studied under Philipp Spitta, and then at the University of Berlin where he received a Ph.D. in 1891 for his dissertation J. P. Sweelinck und seine direkten deutschen Schüler (Jan Pieterszoon Sweelinck and his German pupils).

He died in Schleswig, Germany on the fifteenth, of April, 1948.

== Career ==
As well as producing modern editions of organ pieces by Bach and Buxtehude, Seiffert was responsible for the following:

- Making piano transcriptions of some of Bach's works (in association with Max Schneider).
- Assisting with the editing of the Händel-Gesellschaft.

In 1938 he received the Goethe Medal for Art and Science.
