= Wolfgang Schmieder =

German musicologist

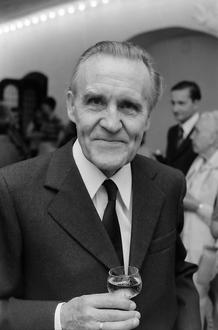
Wolfgang Schmieder

Wolfgang Schmieder (May 29, 1901 – November 8, 1990) was a German music librarian and musicologist.

Schmieder was born in Bromberg (now Bydgoszcz, Poland).

== Education and Career ==
Schmieder studied musicology, literary history, and art history at the University of Heidelberg, where he received his doctorate in 1927 and worked as an assistant at the Musicological Institute until 1930. In 1931, he passed the librarianship examination in Leipzig and then worked as a librarian at the Saxon State and University Library Dresden. From 1933 to 1942, he was an archivist and music librarian at the publishing house Breitkopf & Härtel in Leipzig. Schmieder served as the Special Advisor for Music in Frankfurt am Main at the Johann Christian Senckenberg University Library from April 1942 until his retirement in 1963. He lived in Freiburg im Breisgau until his death in November 1990 at the age of 89.

== His BWV catalog ==
Schmieder is best known for his Bach Works Catalogue (BWV), which he compiled between 1946 and 1950. In 1950, he published the BWV, ("Bach Works Catalogue"), a catalog of musical works by Johann Sebastian Bach. The numbering system used in the BWV has since become a nearly universal standard, used by scholars and musicians around the world. (BWV numbers are sometimes referred to as "Schmieder" numbers; the designations S 971 and BWV 971 therefore refer to the same thing, the Italian Concerto.)
