= Philipp Spitta =

German music historian and musicologist (1841–1894)

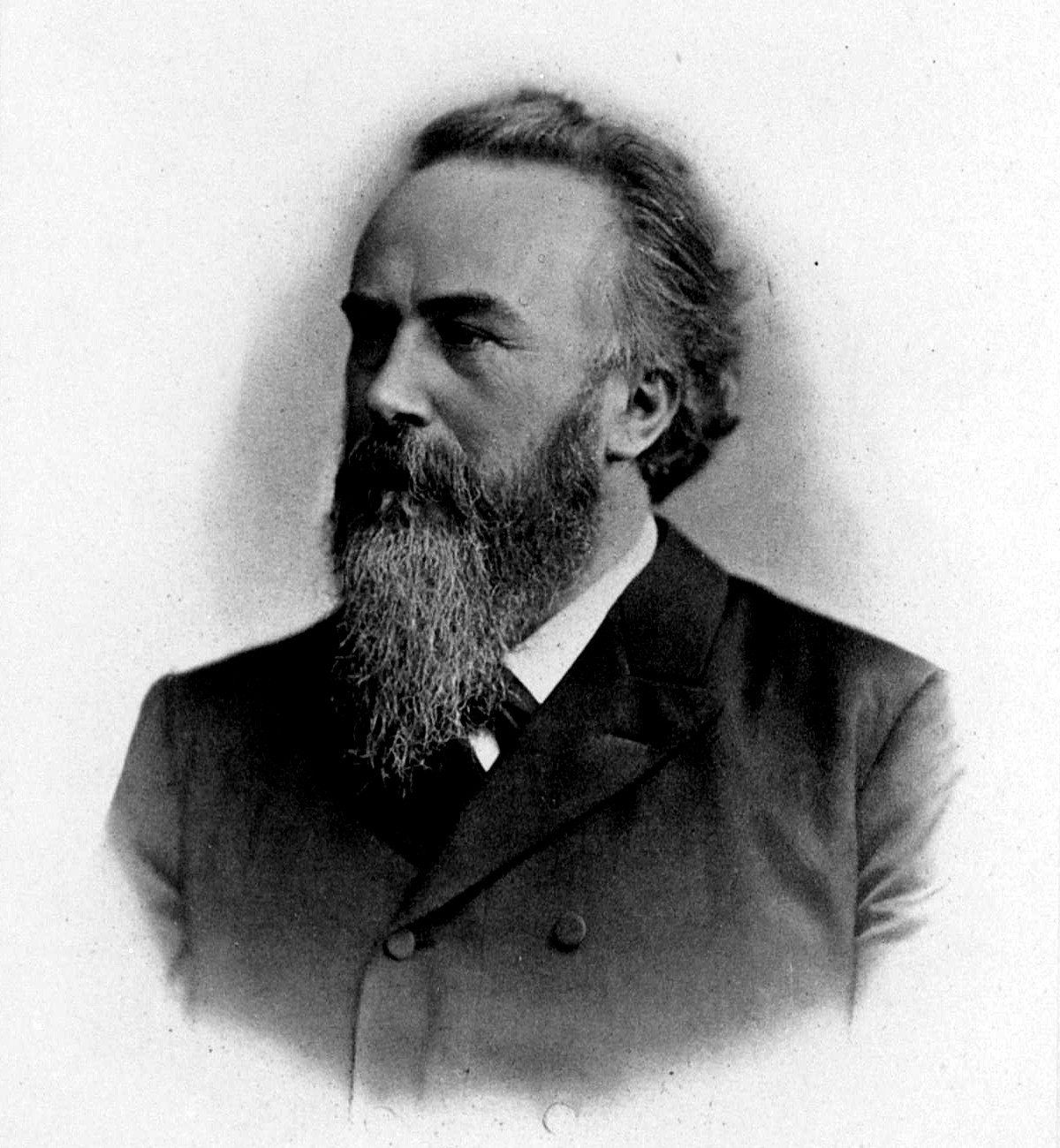
Philipp Spitta

Julius August Philipp Spitta (27 December 1841 – 13 April 1894) was a German music historian and musicologist best known for his 1873 biography of Johann Sebastian Bach.

== Life ==
He was born in Wechold, near Hoya, and his father, also called Philipp Spitta, was a theologian and wrote the Protestant collection of hymns entitled Psalter und Harfe. As a child, the younger Spitta learnt the piano, pipe organ, and musical composition. He studied theology and classical philology at the University of Göttingen from 1860, graduating in 1864 with a Ph.D. for a dissertation on Tacitus (Der Satzbau bei Tacitus, 1866). While at university, he composed, wrote a biography of Robert Schumann, and became friends with Johannes Brahms. He became a teacher of Ancient Greek and Latin language in, successively, Reval, Sondershausen, and Leipzig at the Old St Nicholas School (Alte Nikolaischule), while pursuing his interest in and lecturing on music history in general and Johann Sebastian Bach in particular.

His Bach study began to be published in 1873, and was followed by an appointment as professor of music history at the University of Berlin in 1875, and a further appointment as administrative director of the Berlin Hochschule für Musik, at which posts he remained for the rest of his life. The students he taught include Oskar Fleischer, Max Friedlaender, Carl Krebs, Max Seiffert, Agnes Tschetschulin, Emil Vogel, Peter Wagner, Johannes Wolf, and Arthur Prüfer. He founded one of the first scholarly music periodicals, the Vierteljahrsschrift für Musikwissenschaft, with Friedrich Chrysander and Guido Adler in 1885, and also had an important role in the publication of the Denkmäler deutscher Tonkunst.

== Work ==
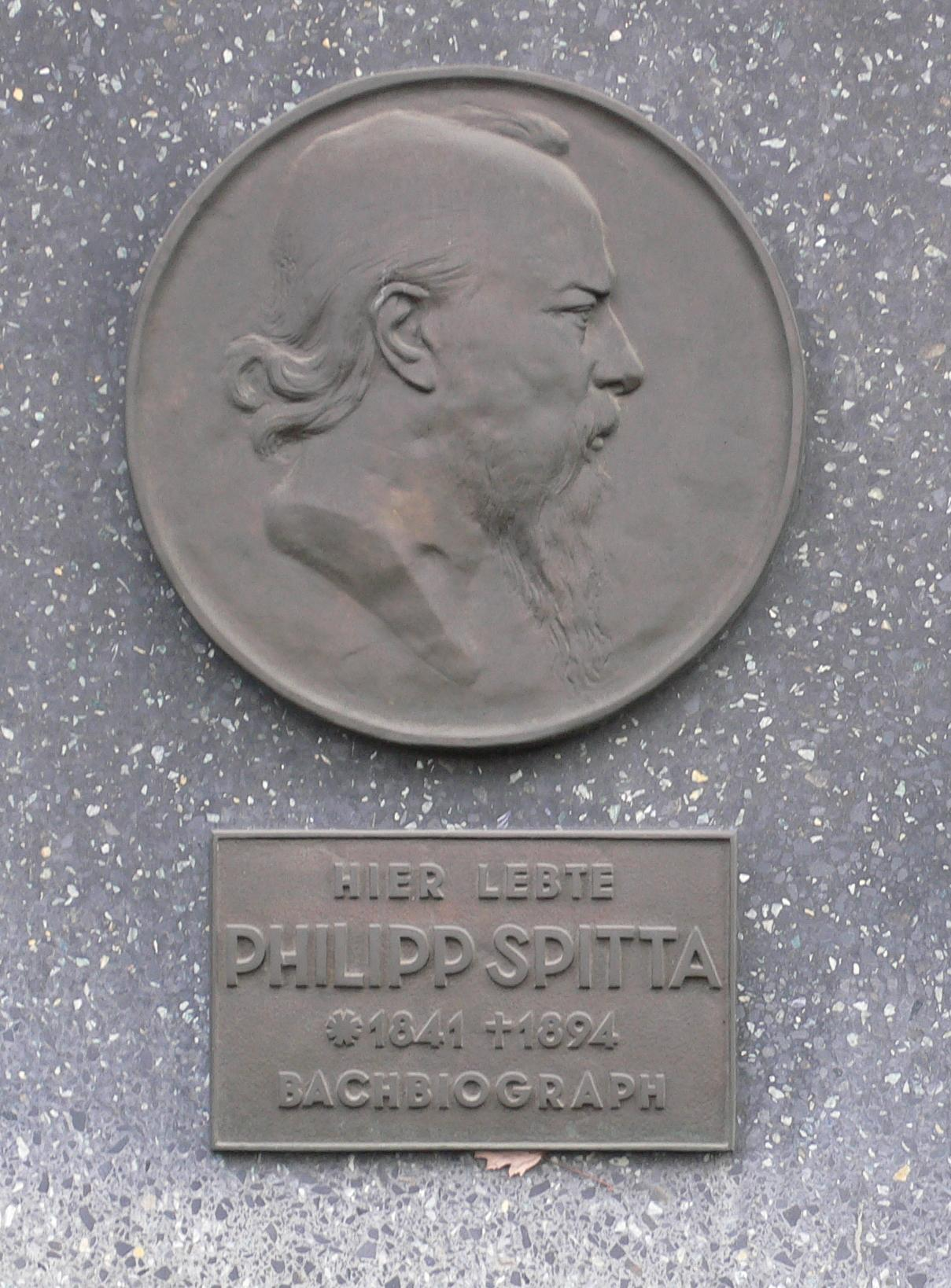
A commemorative plaque in Berlin

He left a strong influence on the new fields of historical criticism and musicology; his work spanned periods of music history from the early Middle Ages to his own time, and embraced research, teaching, writing, and editing of musical editions to a very rigorous degree, including the use of source-critical studies. He was influenced by neo-Kantian philosophy. In his Bach biography, he wrote the first major study of German choral and keyboard music of the 17th century (early baroque).

=== Books ===
Most of his papers are divided between the library of the Berlin Hochschule für Musik, the Staatsbibliothek zu Berlin, and the library of the University of Łódź. He contributed many scholarly articles to periodicals, and wrote articles on Schumann, Spontini, and Weber for Grove's Dictionary of Music and Musicians in 1886.

- Ein Lebensbild Robert Schumanns (Leipzig, 1862)
- Johann Sebastian Bach (Leipzig, 1873–1880, 1962; English translation: Johann Sebastian Bach. His Work and Influence on the Music of Germany, 1685 – 1750 (Clara Bell and J. A. Fuller-Maitland, transl.), 1884–1885, 1899)
- Musikalische Werke Friedrichs des Grossen (Leipzig, 1889)
- Zur Musik (Berlin, 1892) – 16 essays
- Musikgeschichtliche Aufsätze (Berlin, 1894) – collected essays

=== Editions ===
- Dietrich Buxtehude: Orgelwerke (Leipzig, 1876–1877)
- Heinrich Schütz: Sämtliche Werke (Leipzig, 1885–1894)

== Sources ==
- Christoph Wolff: 'Spitta, (Julius August) Philipp', Grove Music Online ed. L. Macy (Accessed 2007-06-13), http://www.grovemusic.com/
