= List of people from Erfurt =

This list contains people both born in Erfurt and notable residents of the city, ordered chronologically.

== Born in Erfurt, Germany ==
The following persons were born in Erfurt respectively within the current city borders.

=== 14th century ===
- Alexander Suslin (died before 1349), rabbi

=== 15th century ===
- Erhard Etzlaub (1460–1532), astronomer
- de:Johannes Lang (c. 1487–1548), theologian; the "Reformer of Erfurt"
- Henricus Grammateus (1495–1526), mathematician

=== 16th century ===
- Michael Altenburg (1584–1640), theologian, born in Alach
- Johannes Thesselius (1590–1643), composer

=== 17th century ===
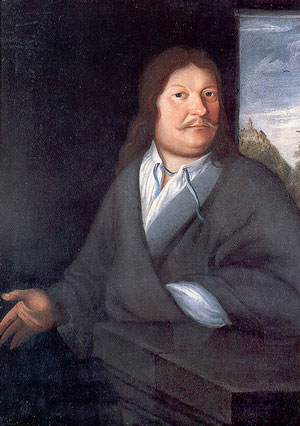
Johann Ambrosius Bach 1685

- Johannes Bach (1604–1673), composer
- Hiob Ludolf (1624–1704), orientalist
- Johann Michael Vansleb (1635–1679), theologian
- Maria Elisabeth Lämmerhirt (1644–1694), mother of Johann Sebastian Bach
- Johann Aegidius Bach (1645–1716), organist
- Johann Ambrosius Bach (1645–1695), musician
- Johann Christoph Bach (1645–1693), musician
- Johann Heinrich Buttstett (1666–1727), composer, born in Bindersleben
- Johann Christoph Bach (1671–1721), composer
- Johann Bernhard Bach (1676–1749), composer
- Johann Gottfried Walther (1684–1748), music theorist
- Wilhelm Hieronymus Pachelbel (1685–1764), composer
- Elias David Häusser (1687–1745), architect
- Amalia Pachelbel (1688–1723), painter
- Jakob Adlung (1699–1762), organist, born in Bindersleben

=== 18th century ===
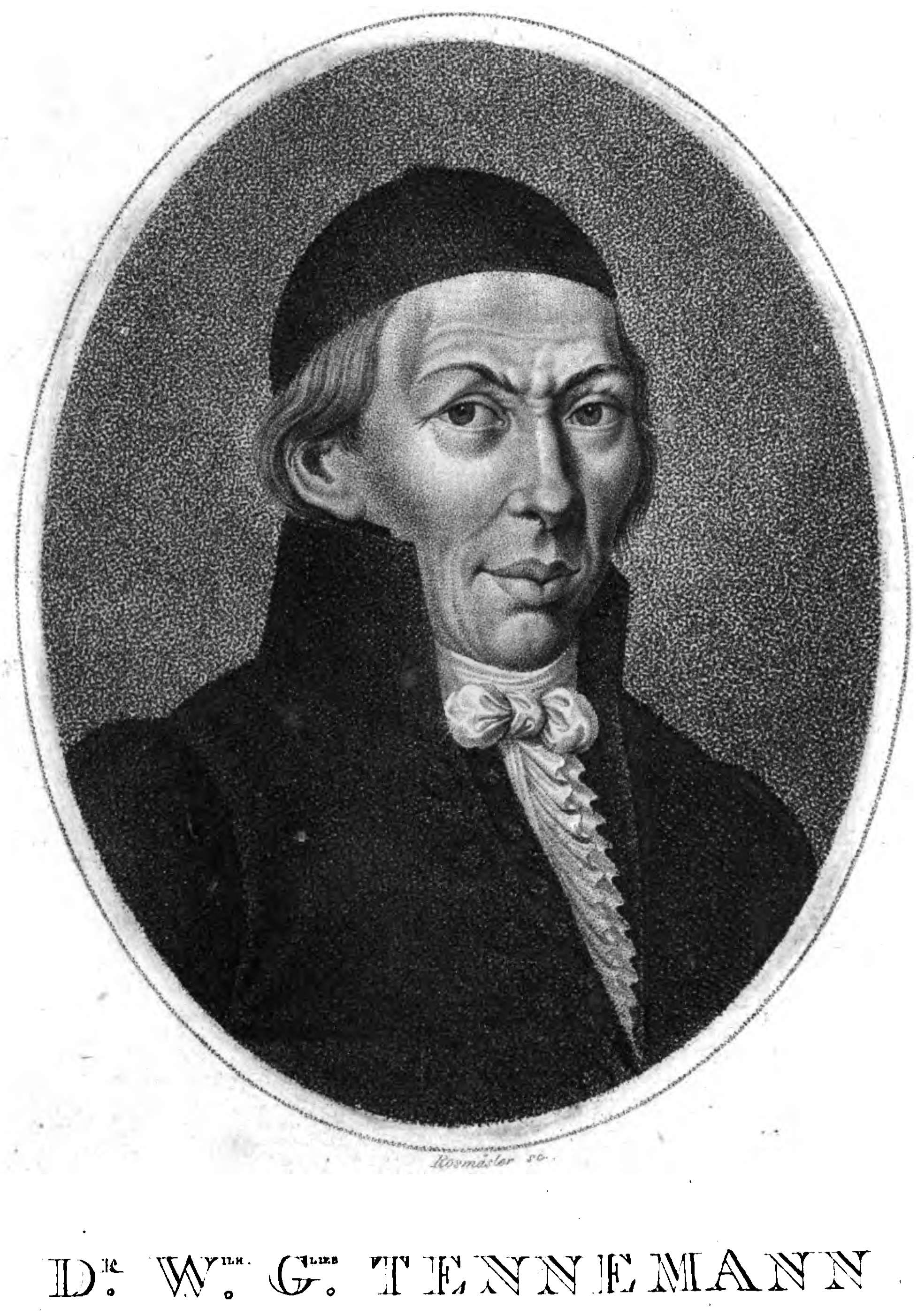
Wilhelm Gottlieb Tennemann 1817

- Johann Rudolf Engau (1708–1755), jurist
- Sidonia Hedwig Zäunemann (1711–1740), poet
- Johann Christian Kittel (1732–1809), composer
- Johann Hieronymus Schröter (1745–1816), astronomer
- Johann Wilhelm Hässler (1747–1822), composer
- Samuel Gottlieb Vogel (1750–1837), physician
- Rudolph Zacharias Becker (1752–1822), educator
- Johann Joachim Bellermann (1754–1842), theologist
- Wilhelm Gottlieb Tennemann (1761–1819), historian
- Johann Trommsdorff (1770–1837), chemist
- Johann Jakob Bernhardi (1774–1850), botanist
- Justus Hecker (1795–1850), physician

=== 19th century ===
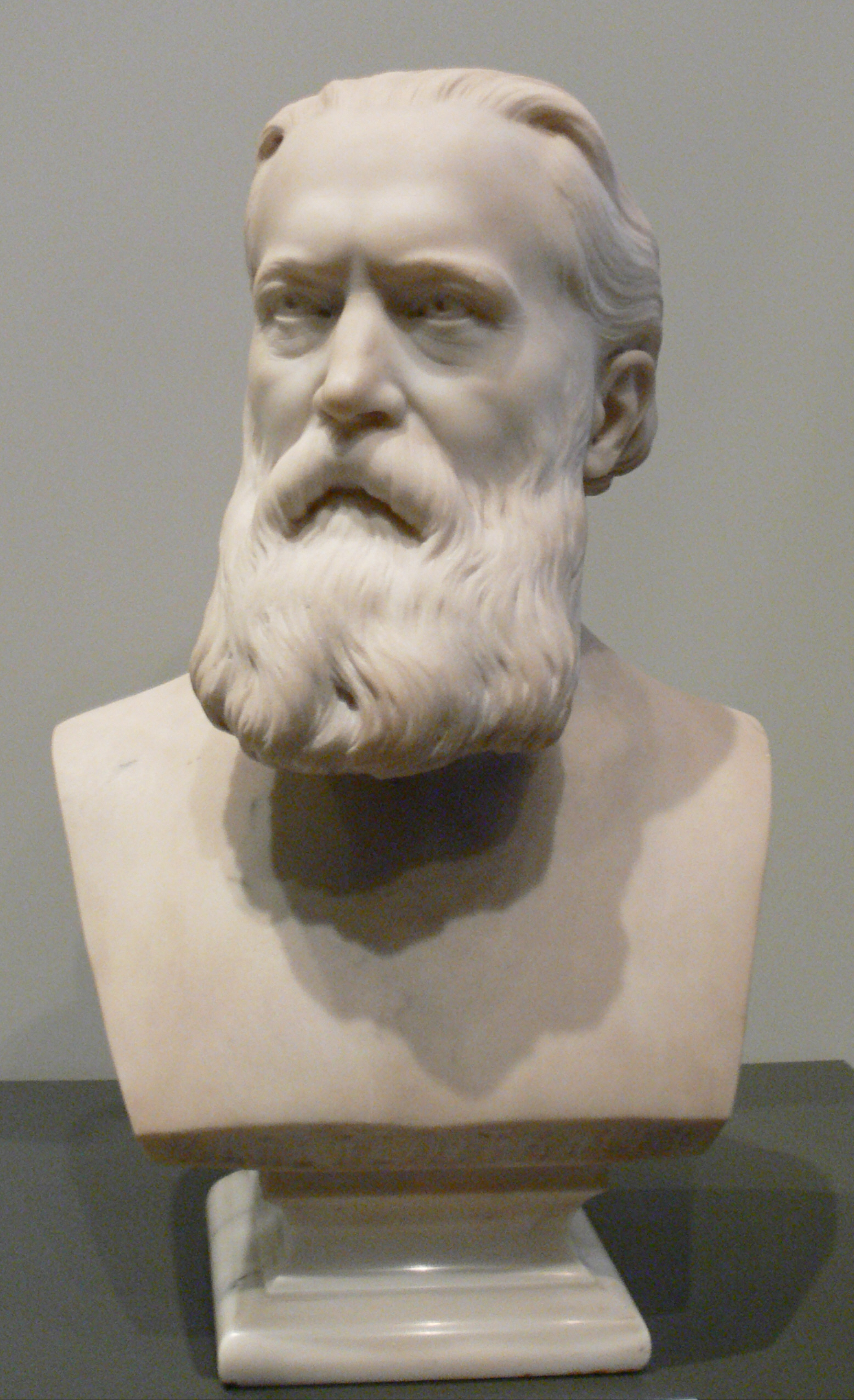
Carl Martin Reinthaler Bust by Kropp 1902

- August Soller (1805–1853), architect and Schinkel student
- Christian Eduard Langethal (1806–1878), botanist
- Hugo Rothstein (1810–1865), officer
- August Gottfried Ritter (1811–1885), composer and organist
- Anton Dominik Fernkorn (1813–1878), sculptor
- Eduard Gerhardt (1813–1888), painter, draftsman, printmaker, lithographer and architect
- Ferdinand Bellermann (1814–1889), landscape painter
- Fritz Müller (1821–1897), biologist, born in Windischholzhausen
- Carl Reinthaler (1822–1896), composer, conductor and director of the cathedral choir in Bremen
- Oskar Schade (1826–1906), philologist
- Otto Ribbeck (1827–1898), classical scholar
- Julius Grosse (1828–1902), writer and theater critic
- Alfred Kirchhoff (1838–1907), geographer
- Carl von Thieme (1844–1924), co-founder of two large German insurance companies Munich reinsurance company and Allianz AG
- Bernhard Ziehn (1845–1912), music theorist
- Paul von Kleist (1846–1926), Prussian lieutenant general
- Johann Heinrich Hübschmann (1848–1908), philologist
- Günther von Kirchbach (1850–1925), general
- Oskar von Hutier (1857–1934), General in World War I
- Max Weber (1864–1920), sociologist, lawyer, economist and social economist
- Johannes Franz Hartmann (1865–1936), astronomer
- Hermann Kiese (1865–1923), rosarian, born in Vieselbach
- Alfred Weber (1868–1958), economist, sociologist and cultural philosopher
- Paul Lipke (1870–1955), chess master
- Max E. Binner (born 1883), politician
- Hubert Weise (1884–1950), general
- Erich Zeigner (1886–1949) politician (SPD/SED), prime minister of Saxony 21 March to 29 October 1923
- Willi Münzenberg (1889–1940), communist, publisher and film producer
- Erika Glässner (1890–1959), actress
- Erich Köhler (1892–1958), politician (CDU), president of the Bundestag from 1949 to 1950
- Walter Zander (1898–1993), lawyer

=== 20th century ===
==== 1900s ====
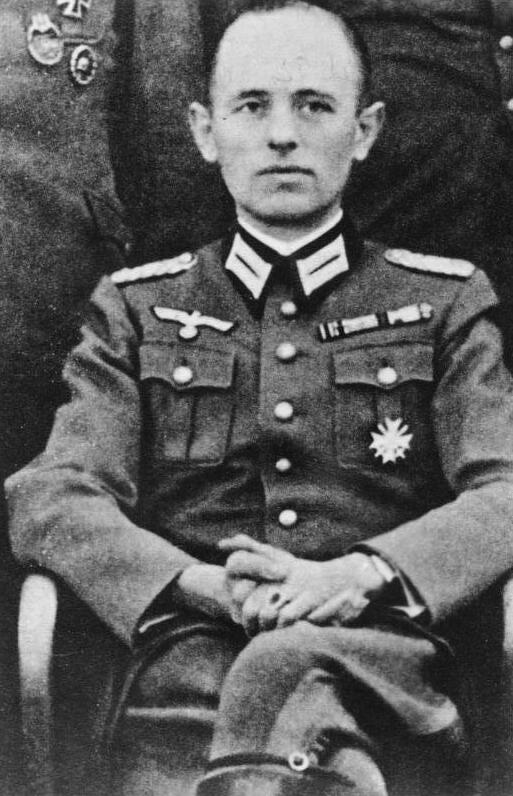
Reinhard Gehlen

- Werner Danckert (1900–1970), musicologist
- Reinhard Gehlen (1902–1979), German general, first president of Federal Intelligence Service
- Hans Hess (1907–1975), museologist
- Margaretha Reichardt (1907–1984), textile designer and Bauhaus alumni
- Hans Günther (1910–1945), policeman, Sturmbannführer and head of the Central office for Jewish emigration in Prague

==== 1910s ====
- Max Lackmann (1910–2000), ecumenist
- Heinrich Schonder (1910–1943), U-boat commander
- Hans Fleischhacker (1912–1992), anthropologist, born in Töttleben
- Käthe Menzel-Jordan (1916–2026), architect
- Gerhard Schöpfel (1912–2003), flying ace
- Rolf Günther (1913–1945), major in SS

==== 1920s ====
- Annemarie Schimmel (1922–2003), orientalist
- Wolf Schneider (1925–2022), journalist, nonfiction author and language critic
- Peer Schmidt (1926–2010), actor
- Gert Schramm (1928–2016), survivor of Buchenwald concentration camp
- Winfried Herz (born 1929), footballer
- Reinhard Lettau (1929–1996), writer

==== 1930s ====
- Johannes Wallmann (born 1930), professor of church history at the University of Bochum, pietism researcher
- Georg Stoltze (1931–2007), cyclist
- Wilhelm Brückner (born 1932), luthier
- Jutta Langenau (1933–1982), swimmer
- Lothar Stäber (born 1936), cyclist
- Lothar Ahrendt (born 1936), politician (SED), from 1989 to 1990 Minister of the Interior of the GDR
- Joachim Wendler (1939–1975), aquanaut

==== 1940s ====
- Paul Friedrichs (1940–2012), motorcycle racer
- Niels Lund Chrestensen (1940–2025), businessman and plant breeder
- Alexander Lang (1941–2024), director and actor
- Gerd Nauhaus (born 1942), musicologist
- Wolfgang Scheidel (born 1943), luger
- Boris Gulko (born 1947), Grandmaster in chess
- Christine Westermann (born 1948), television host and author
- Christel Augenstein (born 1949), politician, 2001-2009 mayor of Pforzheim
- Ralf Schulenberg (born 1949), footballer

==== 1950s ====
- Klaus Wunder (born 1950), footballer
- Jochen Babock (born 1953), bobsledder
- Ulrich Holbein (born 1953), writer
- Ute Lubosch (born 1953), actress
- Joachim Werneburg (born 1953), writer
- Evelyn Stolze (born 1954), swimmer

==== 1960s ====
- Sabine Busch (born 1962), athlete
- Carsten Sänger (born 1962), football player
- Stefan Böger (born 1966), football player and coach
- Axel Kühn (born 1967), bobsledder
- Maik Landsmann (born 1967), cyclist and Olympic champion
- Sybille Gruner (born 1969), handball player
- Thomas Luther (born 1969), Grandmaster in chess
- Eyck Zimmer (born 1969), award-winning chef

==== 1970s ====
- Thomas Rudolph (born 1970), luger
- Christoph Genz (born 1971), tenor
- Andreas Müller (born 1971), paralympic athlete
- Marco Weißhaupt (born 1972), footballer
- Steffen Wöller (born 1972), luger
- Katrin Apel (born 1973), biathlete
- Andreas Bausewein (born 1973), politician (SPD) and mayor of Erfurt (2006-2024)
- Alexander Beyer (born 1973), film actor (Good Bye Lenin, The Legend of Rita, Sonnenallee)
- André Korff (born 1973), cyclist
- Erik Niedling (born 1973), artist
- Sabine Völker (born 1973), speed skater
- Daniela Anschütz-Thoms (born 1974), speed skater and Olympic champion
- Franziska Schenk (born 1974), speed skater
- Marco Schreyl (born 1974), television host
- Matthias Höpfner (born 1975), bobsledder
- Carsten Schneider (born 1976), politician (SPD), Member of Bundestag since 1998
- Daniel Becke (born 1978), cyclist
- Anja Schneiderheinze-Stöckel (born 1978), bobsledder
- Stephan Schreck (born 1978), cyclist
- René Wolff (born 1978), cyclist
- Yvonne Catterfeld (born 1979), singer and actress
- Silvio Smalun (born 1979), figure skater

==== 1980s ====
- Clueso (born 1980) (a.k.a. Thomas Hübner), singer
- Clemens Fritz (born 1980), footballer
- Stefan Lindemann (born 1980), figure skater
- Andreas Pohle (born 1981), long jumper and triple jumper
- Janin Reinhardt (born 1981), television presenter and actress
- Judith Hesse (born 1982), speed skater
- Christian Müller (born 1982), cyclist
- Simon Schwartz (born 1982), illustrator and comic novel writer
- Robert Lehmann (born 1984), speed skater
- Elisabeth Pähtz (born 1985), Grandmaster in chess
- Martin Ullmann (born 1986), footballer
- Kristin Wieczorek (born 1986), figure skater
- Patrick Gretsch (born 1987), cyclist
- Stephanie Beckert (born 1988), speed skater
- Thomas Ströhl (born 1988), footballer
- Christian Beck (born 1988), football player

==== 1990s ====
- Patrick Beckert (born 1990), speed skater
- Denis Wieczorek (born 1991), figure skater
- Florian Wünsche (born 1991), actor
- Kevin Möhwald (born 1993), footballer
- Silvano Varnhagen (born 1993), footballer

== Notable residents of Erfurt ==
- Eoban (died 754), martyr, buried in Erfurt
- Eleazar of Worms (1176–1238), taldmudist, worked as hazzan in Erfurt
- Henry of Friemar the Elder (c. 1245–1340), an Augustinian friar, philosopher, theologian and aesthetic writer.
- Meister Eckhart (c.1260–1327), theologian, lived in Erfurt
- Henry of Friemar the Younger (c. 1285–1354) Augustinian friar and theologian
- Johannes de Indagine (c.1415–1475), Carthusian monk and theologian
- Jacob Weil (died before 1456), rabbinate in Erfurt
- Martin Luther (1483–1546), lived as student and later as an Augustinian friar in Erfurt
- Adam Ries (1492–1559), mathematician, worked in Erfurt between 1518 and 1522/23
- Justus Jonas (1493–1555), Lutheran theologian and Rector of University of Erfurt.
- Johannes Loersfeld (fl. 1520s), printer, worked in Erfurt in the 1520s
- Basil Faber (1520–1576), schoolmaster, worked in Erfurt between 1571 and 1576
- Christoph Bach (1613–1661), worked in Erfurt between 1642 and 1652
- Heinrich Bach (1615–1692), organist, worked in Erfurt
- Johann Pachelbel (1653–1706), composer and organist, worked in Erfurt between 1678 and 1690
- Andreas Armsdorff (1670–1699), composer, worked in Erfurt
- Karl Theodor Anton Maria von Dalberg (1744–1817), governor of Erfurt
- Paulus Stephanus Cassel (1821–1892), writer, lived in Erfurt
- Emil Büchner (1826–1908), conductor
- Moritz Callmann Wahl (1829–1887), writer, lived in Erfurt
- Ernst Dircksen (1831–1899), architect, lived in Erfurt since 1890
- Richard Wetz (1875–1935), composer, lived in Erfurt since 1906
- Joel Brand (1906–1964), zionist, grew up in Erfurt
- Walter Werneburg (1922–1999), artist, lived in Erfurt
- Hans-Joachim Göring (1923–2010), footballer, lived in Erfurt
- Joachim Meisner (1933-2017), cardinal
- Paul Friedrichs (1940–2012), motocross racer, lived in Erfurt
- Gunda Niemann-Stirnemann (born 1966), speed skater
- Marcus Urban (born 1971), footballer with FC Rot-Weiß Erfurt
