= Johann Bach =

Johann Bach may refer to:

- Johann Sebastian Bach (1685–1750), German composer and musician
- Johann Christian Bach (1735–1782), J.S. Bach's youngest son
- Johann Ambrosius Bach (1645–1695), J.S. Bach's father
- Johannes Bach (1604–1673), great-uncle of the former, also a composer

== See also ==
- Johann Christoph Bach (disambiguation)
