= Veit Bach =

Founder of musical Bach family

- Born: Vitus Bach c. 1550 or 1555; Possibly Pozsony, Kingdom of Hungary (modern Bratislava, Slovakia)
- Died: 8 March 1619; Wechmar, Saxe-Coburg (in modern Thuringia, Germany)
- Other name: Veit Bach
- Children: Johannes Bach I
- Relatives: Bach family; Johann Ambrosius Bach (great-grandson); Johann Sebastian Bach (great-great-grandson)

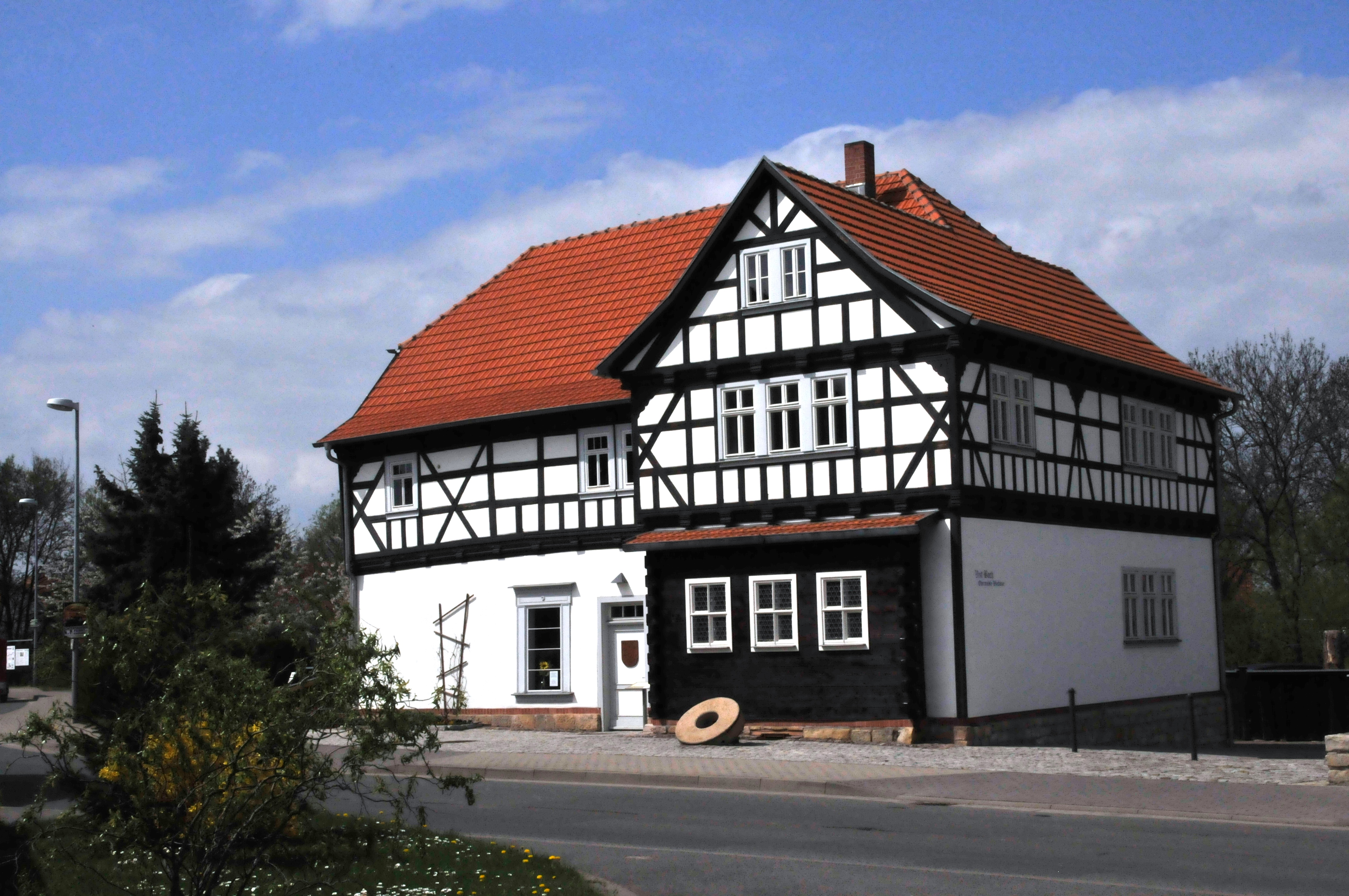
The Veit Bach Mill, at Wechmar.

Vitus "Veit" Bach (c. 1550 – 8 March 1619) was a German baker and miller who, according to Johann Sebastian Bach, founded the Bach family, which became one of the most important families in musical history.

== Life and family ==
Veit's son, Johannes Bach I (ca. 1580–1626), was the grandfather of Johann Ambrosius Bach, J.S. Bach's father, Veit therefore being Johann Sebastian's great-great-grandfather. Other theories hold that a different Veit Bach who died before 1578 in Erfurt was the father of Johann(es)/Hans, so was Johann Sebastian's great-great-grandfather.

Evading religious persecution in the Kingdom of Hungary, then under the control of the staunchly Roman Catholic Habsburgs, Bach, being a Protestant, settled in Wechmar, a village in the German state of Thuringia. His descendants continued to live there until Christoph Bach, grandfather of J. S. Bach, moved to Erfurt to take up a position as municipal musician or Stadtpfeifer (town piper). Bach's son Johannes Bach studied music with the town's head piper.

== Musicianship ==
In The Ursprung - Ursprung der musicalisch-Bachischen Familie (1735) - J.S. Bach placed Veit at the head of the Wechmar line of Bachs, and the earliest member of the family to show any musical proclivities. His hobby was playing the 'cythringen' (a small cittern). Bach adds an additional sentence: "this was, as it were, the beginning of music in his descendants", implying that none of his ancestors was a professional musician.

== In popular culture ==
Veit Bach is frequently referred to in the 2021 novel by Laszlo Krasznahorkai, Herscht 07769.

== See also ==
- Bach's Nekrolog
