= Bach family =

Family of notable musicians and composers

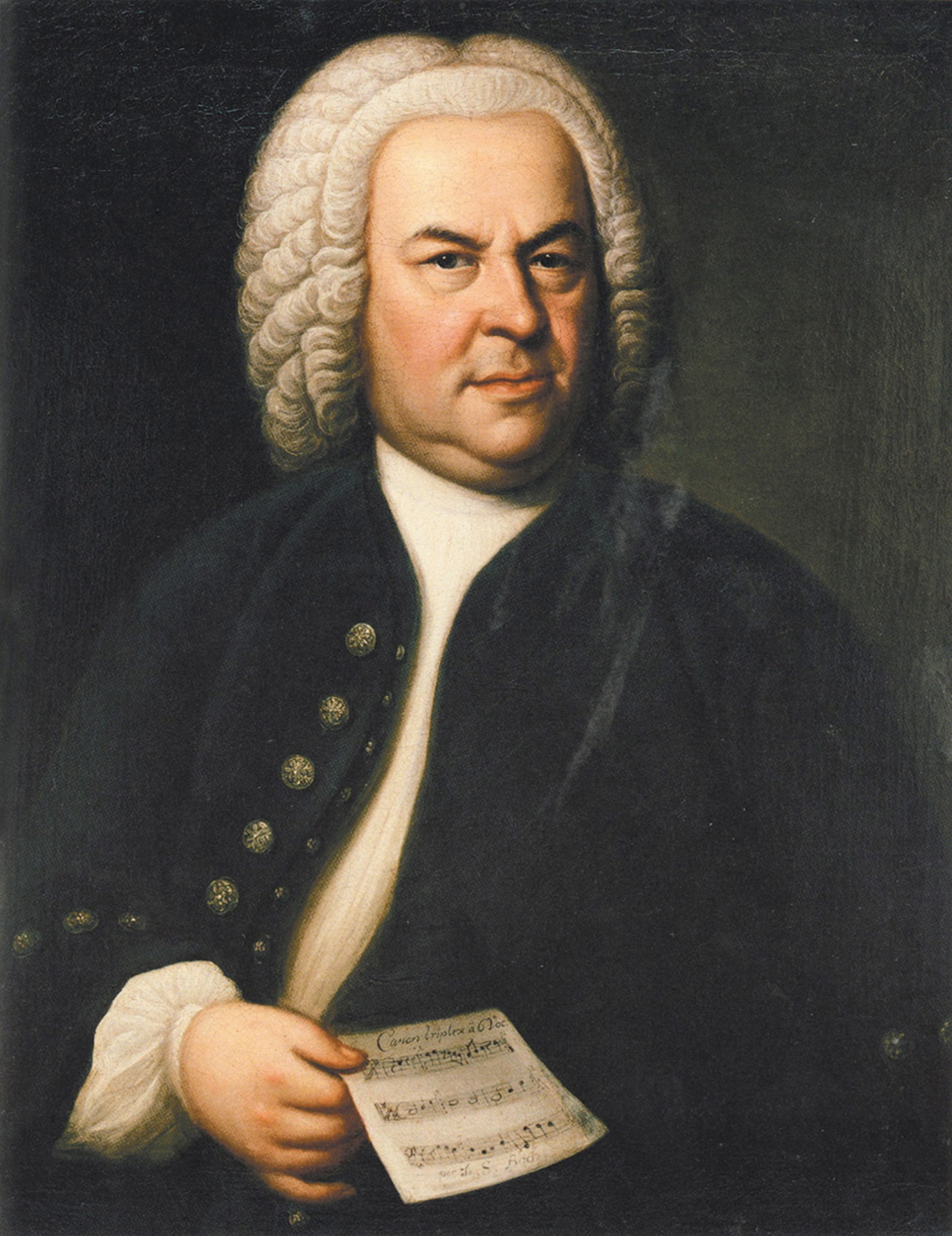
Portrait of Johann Sebastian Bach by E. G. Haussmann, 1748

The Bach family is a family of notable composers of the Baroque and Classical periods of music, the best-known of whom was Johann Sebastian Bach (1685–1750). There are surviving descendants of the Erfurt Line, such as the great-great-great-grandson of Frederich Leopold Bach or the daughters of Philip Frederick Bach, Susan Jean Weaver and Nancy Louis Hertzog Bach. A family genealogy was drawn up by Johann Sebastian Bach himself in 1735 when he was 50 and was continued by his son Carl Philipp Emanuel Bach.

== Descendants of Johann Sebastian Bach ==
Of the seven children that Johann Sebastian Bach had with his first wife Maria Barbara Bach (1684–1720), his second cousin, four survived into adulthood: Catharina Dorothea Bach (1708–1774); Wilhelm Friedemann (1710–1784); Carl Philipp Emanuel (the "Berlin Bach", later the "Hamburg Bach") (1714–1788); and Johann Gottfried Bernhard (1715–1739). All four were musically talented, and Wilhelm Friedeman and Carl Philipp Emanuel had significant musical careers of their own.

After his first wife died, Johann Sebastian Bach married Anna Magdalena Wilcken (1701–1760), a gifted soprano and daughter of the court trumpeter of Prince Saxe-Weissenfels. They had 13 children, of whom Johann Christoph Friedrich (the "Bückeburg Bach") (1732–1795) and Johann Christian (the "London Bach") (1735–1782) became significant musicians. A further four survived into adulthood: Gottfried Heinrich (1724–1763); Elisabeth Juliane Friederica (1726–1781), who married Bach's pupil Johann Christoph Altnickol (1719–1759); Johanna Carolina (1737–1781); and Regina Susanna (1742–1809).

Of Bach's surviving children, only five married. Of these, Johann Christian had no children from his marriage to the soprano Cecilia Grassi. Carl Philipp Emanuel, who married Johanna Maria Dannemann, had three surviving children. Of these children the youngest, Johann Sebastian (1748–1778) was a gifted painter who died young. None of Emanuel's children married or had offspring, with his bloodline dying out with the death of his daughter Anna Carolina Philippina (1747–1804).

Elisabeth Juliane Friederica, known as Liesgen, had three surviving children with Altnickol. Their only son, Johann Sebastian, died in infancy in 1749. The elder daughter, Augusta Magdalena (1751–1809) married Ernest Friedrich Ahlefeldt (1746–1787) and had four daughters, of whom only one, Christiane Johanne (1780–1816) survived. From her marriage to Paul Johann Müller, a daughter, Augusta Wilhelmina (1809–1818) was born, though she died as an infant, ending this line of Bach's descendants.

Of the next generation, Wilhelm Friedrich Ernst Bach, also known as William Bach (24 May 1759 – 25 December 1845) was the eldest son of Johann Christoph Friedrich Bach and the only grandson of Johann Sebastian Bach to gain fame as a composer. He was music director to Frederick William II of Prussia. His only son died in infancy. The first born of his three daughters, Caroline Augusta Wilhelmine, lived the longest. She died in 1871 – the last of Bach's descendants to hold the Bach name.

Bach has living descendants via two granddaughters born to Friedemann and Johann Christoph Friedrich, respectively. Anna Philippine Friederike (1755–1804), sister of Wilhelm Friedrich Ernst, married Wilhelm Ernst Colson (1746–1795), a lieutenant in an artillery regiment. They had five sons and a daughter. Whereas this bloodline was traditionally assumed to have died out with this generation, one of her sons, Johann Christoph Friedrich (1778–1831), married and had offspring with progeny to the modern day.

Friedemann married Dorothea Elisabeth Georgi and had two sons and a daughter. Both sons died in infancy. During the 20th-century, scholarship has uncovered several children born to his daughter Friederica Sophia (b. 1757), who were hitherto unknown. In 1793, Friederica Sophia married Johann Schmidt, a foot soldier, shortly after the birth of an illegitimate daughter. Little is known about this child and her sister. In 1780, she had given birth to an illegitimate son, about whom nothing else is known. Friederica Sophia appears to have left her husband for a man by the name of Schwarzschulz, with whom she had an illegitimate daughter, Karoline Beata (b. 1798), whose descendants eventually emigrated to Oklahoma.

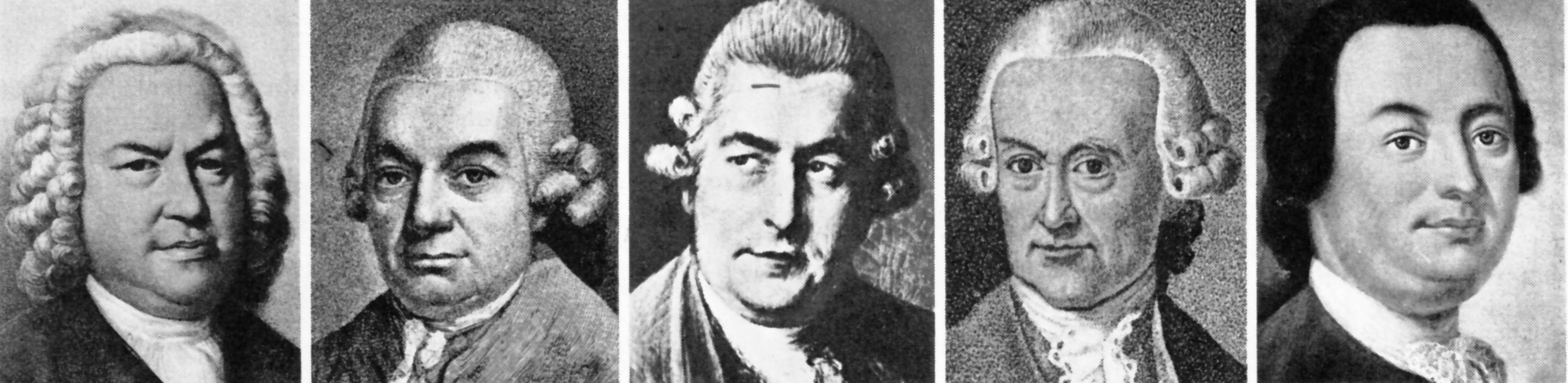
Johann Sebastian Bach and his sons Carl Philipp Emanuel, Johann Christian, Wilhelm Friedemann, and Johann Christoph Friedrich

== Expanded genealogy ==
- Hans Friderich von der Bach (1500–1564) married Anna von der Bach née Messerer (1502–1568)
  - (Gothofid “Hans” Bach ) (c. 1508–1591), married Brigitta Müllers (1512–1594) (parents of Veit Bach)
    - Veit Bach (c. 1550–1619)
      - Johannes Bach I (d. 1626) (son of Veit Bach)
        - Johann(es) Bach III (1604–1673) – the so-called Erfurt Line or the Surviving Erfurt Line
          - Johann Christian Bach I (1640–1682)
            - Johann Jacob Bach II (1668–1692)
            - Johann Christoph Bach IV (1673–1727)
              - Johann Samuel Bach (1694–1720)
              - Johann Christian Bach II (1696–?)
              - Johann Günther Bach II (1703–1756)
          - Johann Egidius Bach I (1645–1716)
            - Johann Balthasar Bach (1673–1691)
            - Johann Bernhard Bach I (1676–1749)
              - Johann Ernst Bach II (1722–1777)
              - Johann Georg Bach I (1751–1797)
            - Johann Christoph Bach VI (1685–1740)
              - Johann Friedrich Bach II (1706–1743)
                - Johann Christoph Bach IX (1736–1808)
                  - Johann Friderich Nikolas Bach (1760–1827)
                    - Johann Karl Friderich Bach aka Charles Frederik Bach(1790–1859)
                      - Frederich Léopold Bach (1835–1901)
                        - Henrietta Louise Janie Oakes (1870–1940)
                          - Hazel I. Stone (1903–1970)
                            - Catherine Stone (1943–1999) married Kent McLachlan
                              - Kyle MacLachlan (1959–), actor, married Desiree Gruber (1963–)
                                - Callum Lyon MacLachlan (2006–)
                    - Johnann August Reinhold Bach (1799–1880)
                      - Adolph Matthias Bach (1860–1950)
                        - Philip Frederik Bach (1928–2008)
                          - Debra Ellen Carpenter Bach (1954–)
                          - Susan Jeanne Weaver Bach (1957–)
                          - Nancy Louisse Hertzog Bach (1958–)
                      - Reynold Henry Bach (1868–1934)
                        - Constance Lucille Bach (1909–2007)
              - Johann Egidius Bach II (1709–1746)
          - Johann Nicolaus Bach I (1653–1682)
            - Johann Nicholaus Bach Jr. (1682–1738)
              - Johann Jacob Bach (1724–1790)
        - Christoph Bach (1613–1661)
          - Georg Christoph Bach (1642–1697)
            - Johann Valentin Bach (1669–1720)
              - Johann Lorenz Bach (1695–1773)
              - Johann Elias Bach (1705–1755)
                - Johann Michael Bach III (1745–1820) – the music theorist
                  - Johann Georg Bach II (1786–1874)
                  - Georg Friedrich Bach (1792–1860)
          - Johann Christoph Bach II (1645–1693)
            - Johann Ernst Bach I (1683–1739)
            - Johann Christoph Bach VII (1689–1740)
          - Johann Ambrosius Bach (1645–1695) married Maria Elisabetha Lämmerhirt (1644–1694)
            - Johann Rudolf Bach (1670–1670)
            - Johann Christoph Bach III (1671–1721)
              - Johann Andreas Bach (1713–1779)
                - Johann Christoph Georg Bach (1747–1814)
                - Johann Bernhard Bach II (1700–1743)
            - Johann Christoph Bach VIII (1702–1756)
                - Ernst Carl Gottfried Bach (1738–1801)
                - Ernst Christian Bach (1747–1822)
                - Philipp Christian Georg Bach (1734–1809)
            - Johann Jacob Bach III (1682–1722)
            - Johann Sebastian Bach (1685–1750) – wed in his first marriage to second cousin Maria Barbara Bach (1684–1720); in second marriage 1721 to Anna Magdalena Bach née Wilke (1701–1760)
              - Catharina Dorothea Bach (1708–1774)
              - Wilhelm Friedemann Bach (1710–1784) – the so-called "Dresden Bach" or "Halle Bach"
              - Carl Philipp Emanuel Bach(1714–1788) – the so-called “Hamburg Bach"/"Berlin Bach"/"CPE" Bach
                - Johann Sebastian Bach (1748–1778) – painter
              - Johann Gottfried Bernhard Bach (1715–1739)
              - Gottfried Heinrich Bach (1724–1763)
              - Johann Christoph Friedrich Bach (1732–1795) – the so-called "Bückeburg Bach"
                - Wilhelm Friedrich Ernst Bach (1759–1845) – the so-called "Minden Bach"
                  - Carolina Augusta Wilhelmine Bach (1800–1871)
              - Johann Christian Bach III (1735–1782) – the so-called "Milan Bach" or "London Bach"
                - Johnannes Peter Bach (1779–1830)
                  - Johnann Christoph Bach (1815–1863)
                    - Susanna Bach (1850–1923)
        - Heinrich Bach (1615–1692) – the so-called Arnstadt Line or the Nearly Surviving ‘Arnstadt Line’
          - Johann Christoph Bach (1642–1703)
            - Johann Nicolaus Bach (1669–1753)
            - Johann Christoph Bach Jr. (1676–1738)
              - Johann Heinrich Bach (1709–1789)
              - Johann Wilhelm Bach (1722–1794)
            - Johann Friedrich Bach (1682–1730)
            - Johann Michael Bach (1685–)
          - Johann Michael Bach (1648–1694)
            - Maria Barbara Bach (1684–1720) – married Johann Sebastian Bach (1685–1750)
            - Johann Günther Bach (1653–1683)
        - Philippus "Lips" Bach (1590–1620) – son of Veit Bach
          - Wendel Bach (1619–1682)
            - Jacob Bach (1655–1718)
              - Nicolaus Ephraim Bach (1690–1760)
                - Georg Michael Bach (1703–1771)
                  - Johann Christian Bach IV (1743–1814)
              - Johann Ludwig Bach (1677–1731) – the so-called "Meininger Bach", composer
                - Gottlieb Friedrich Bach (1714–1785) – court organist, court painter, Meinigen
                  - Johann Philipp Bach (1752–1846) – musician, painter
                    - Friderich Carl Edward Bach(1815-1903)
                      - Karl Bernhard Paul Bach(1878-1968)
                        - Annalies Bach(1915-2004), married architect Rudolf Ortner (1911-1997)
                - Samuel Anton Bach (1713–1781)
        - Johann Bach IV (1621–1686) – nephew of Lips Bach
          - Johann Stephan Bach (1665–1717)
    - Casper Bach I (1570–1640) (brother of Veit Bach)
      - Casper Bach II (1600–1674)
      - Heinrich "Blinder Jonas" Bach (1599−1635)
      - Johann(es) Bach II (1612–1632)
      - Melchior Bach (1603–1634)
      - Nicolaus Bach (1619–1637)
    - Hans “der Hoffnar” Bach (1550–1615) (2nd brother of Veit Bach)

== See also ==
- P. D. Q. Bach
- List of musical families (classical music)
