= Henry of Friemar =

Henry of Friemar may refer to:

- Henry of Friemar the Elder (c. 1245 – 1340), Augustinian theologian
- Henry of Friemar the Younger (c. 1285 – 1354), Augustinian theologian
