= Johann Sebastian Bach (disambiguation) =

Johann Sebastian Bach (1685–1750) was a German Baroque composer.

Johann Sebastian Bach may also refer to:

- Johann Sebastian Bach (painter) (1748–1778), German painter, grandson of the composer
- Johann Sebastian Bach (TV series), a 1985 TV series

== See also ==
- Johann Christoph Bach (disambiguation)
