= Johannes Bach I =

Founder of musical Bach family

Johannes Bach
- Also known as: Hans Bach
- Born: 1550 or 1580; Wechmar, Germany
- Died: December 26, 1626
- Occupations: Piper, carpet weaver

Johannes Bach (1550 or 1580 – December 26, 1626) was a German piper and carpet weaver. He was the son of Veit Bach, the founder of the Bach family of musicians. He was the great-grandfather of Johann Sebastian Bach.

== Life ==
Johannes was born in Wechmar, Germany, the son of baker and miller Veit Bach.

Johannes did an apprenticeship as a town piper in Gotha and stayed here for a while as a town piper before he returned to Wechmar. He died of the plague during the Thirty Years' War. Johannes Bach had three sons, Johann Bach, Christoph Bach (Johann Sebastian Bach's grandfather) and Heinrich Bach.

Johann Sebastian Bach wrote about his great-grandfather in his family chronicle written in 1735:

“Johannes Bach, the previous son, initially took up the Becker profession. But because he had a special affection for music, the Stadtpfeiffer in Gotha took him on as an apprentice. At that time, the old Grimmenstein Castle was still standing, and according to the custom at the time, his master lived at the Thurme Castle. With whom he was still in good condition for some time after the years of apprenticeship had been completed; but after the destruction of the castle (as happened in Anno 15..) and since his father Veit died in the meantime, he went to Wechmar and there Jfr. Anna Schmiedin, an innkeeper's daughter from Wechmar, married and took possession of her father's estate. Since he was here he has often gone to Gotha, Arnstadt, Erffurth, Eisenach, Schmalkalden and Suhl to help the StadtMusicis there been prescribed. Died in 1626 in then rampant contagion time. But his wife lived nine years after his death as a widow, and died in 1635."

According to Karl Geiringer, Johannes Bach's teacher in Gotha, who is not mentioned by name in the quote from the family chronicle, was the Gotha town piper at the time, Caspar Bach, a relative (probably an uncle or brother). However, it is questionable whether Johannes Bach really once lived in Grimmenstein Castle, since it was finally demolished in 1567. Geiringer also doubts the statement that Johannes Bach is said to have married Anna Schmied only after the death of his father Veit Bach in Wechmar, since Veit Bach did not die until 1619, but Johannes Bach's eldest son Johann Bach was already born in 1604. Johannes Bach probably returned to Wechmar a long time before his father Veit died.

On the other hand, these chronological discrepancies would be resolved according to Christoph Wolff's theory, according to which Johannes Bach and his father Veit were each born about a generation earlier than previously thought. Johannes Bach would then have been born around 1550 and could very well have lived at Grimmenstein Castle. His teacher there was not a Bach name bearer, but Matz Zisecke. Wolff also assumes that Veit Bach died before 1577/78, so that Johannes Bach could well have gone to Wechmar only after his father's death. For example, Johannes Bach was mentioned as the owner of a house in Wechmar in 1577, so he had already taken possession of his father's estate by that time. According to this theory, however, he would only have started a family at a relatively old age, since he would have been around 50 when his eldest son was born in 1604.

In the death register of Wechmar, Johannes Bach appears in 1626 as "Hanss Bach ein Spielmann". The funeral sermon given by J.G. Olearius in 1692 for Johannes Bach's son Heinrich Bach (1615–1692) shows that Johannes Bach also worked as a carpet weaver.

== See also ==
- Bach's Nekrolog
