= Werneburg =

Werneburg is a surname. Notable people with the surname include:

- Joachim Werneburg (born 1953), German poet
- Adolf Werneburg (1813–1886), German local scientist and scientist of forestry
