= John of Sterngassen =

German Dominican philosopher (c.1280–c.1340)

- Born: c. 1280; Cologne, Germany
- Died: c. 1340

John of Sterngassen (c. 1280 – c. 1340) was a German Dominican Thomist philosopher, the brother of Gerhard of Sterngassen. He was a contemporary of Henry of Friemar the Elder. He wrote a commentary on Peter Lombard's Sentences. His sermons shows the influence of Meister Eckhart.
