= Christoph Bach =

Christoph Bach may refer to:

- Christoph Bach (musician) (1613–1661), German musician, grandfather of Johann Sebastian Bach
- Christoph Bach (actor) (born 1975), German actor
