= St. Augustine's Monastery (Erfurt) =

Augustinian Complex, Germany, began 1277

- Augustinerkloster
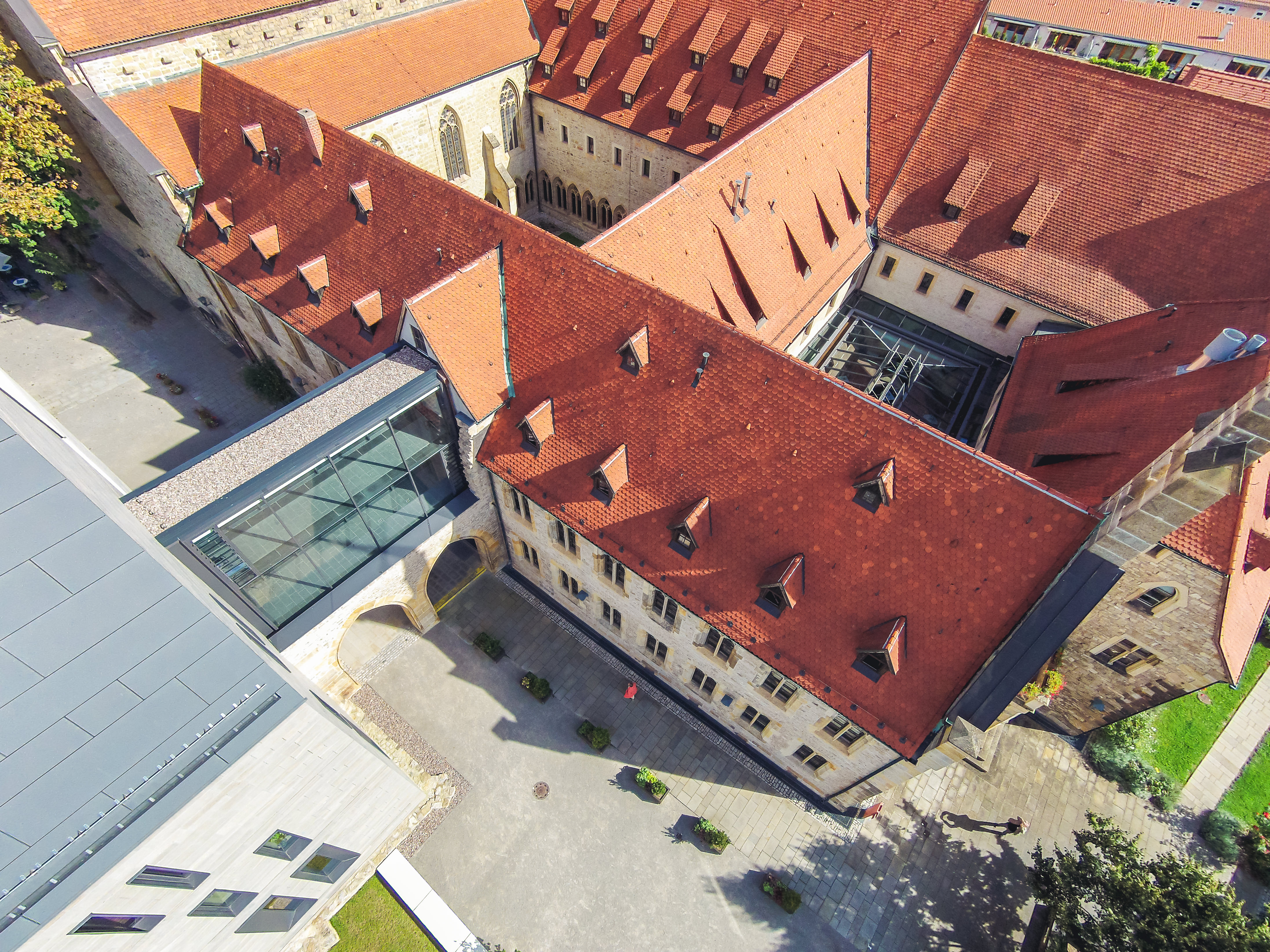

- Location within Thuringia Location within Germany
- Interactive map of St. Augustine's Monastery

Monastery information
- Order: Augustinians
- Denomination: Lutheran previously Catholic
- Established: 13th century
- Controlled churches: Augustinerkirche

People
- Important associated figures: Martin Luther; Johannes Lang; Henry of Friemar the Elder; Henry of Friemar the Younger

Architecture
- Status: Priory
- Heritage designation: Kulturdenkmal in Thuringia

Site
- Location: Erfurt, Thuringia
- Country: Germany
- Coordinates: 50°58′53.25″N 11°1′48.02″E
- Website: augustinerkloster.de

St. Augustine's Monastery (German: Augustinerkloster) in Erfurt, central Germany, is a former church and friary complex dating from the 13th century. The site is almost one hectare (2.5 acres) in size. It was built by Augustinian friars, an order of the Catholic Church. It is most well known as the former home of Martin Luther (1483–1546), the father of the Reformation, who lived there as a friar from 1505 until 1511.

About 74 ordained and 70 lay brothers lived at the friary at its peak in the early 16th century. After the Reformation, from 1525 the friary church was used by the local Lutheran congregation. The site became the property of Erfurt city council after the last friar died in 1556. It was secularised in 1559, but was later reconsecrated in 1854. It now belongs to the Evangelical Church in Central Germany.

Parts of the complex were destroyed in a British air raid in 1945, in which 267 people sheltering on the site were killed. Today the complex has a mixture of medieval and modern buildings. It is now used as a place of worship and as a meeting and conference centre. Music concerts are performed in the church, which has a Walcker organ, built in 1938. It also provides simple accommodation for travellers and for retreats.

In February 2016, an application was made to have St. Augustine's Monastery, along with 11 other sites, added to the UNESCO World Heritage Site designated "Luther Sites in Central Germany". Because of their role in the Reformation, all of these sites are considered to "represent one of the most important events in the religious and political history of the world".

== History ==
=== Establishment and expansion ===
Augustinians had lived in Erfurt since 1266. After some disputes with the city, they were temporarily expelled in 1273, but were allowed to return permanently in 1276. The construction of the church and friary complex began in 1277, funded by donations given to the friars and the sale of indulgences.

Building work continued, with the construction of the St. Katherine's chapel (German: Katharinenkapelle), the chapter house, the church tower, a cloister, and a longhouse and a new priory. The stained glass windows of the church, which were created between 1310 and 1340, are particularly noteworthy.

In 1482, two Woad houses (German: Waidhäuser) were built. One was used to store cereal grains and the other for processing the woad plant to produce valuable blue indigo dye, for which Erfurt was renowned in the Middle Ages. The friars relied on trading woad to help support their livelihood.

The friary also had a notable Studium generale, an early form of university, led by Henry of Friemar the Elder (c.1245–1340), an Augustinian friar, philosopher, theologian and aesthetic writer.

The construction of the library began in 1506 and took until 1518 to complete.

=== Martin Luther ===
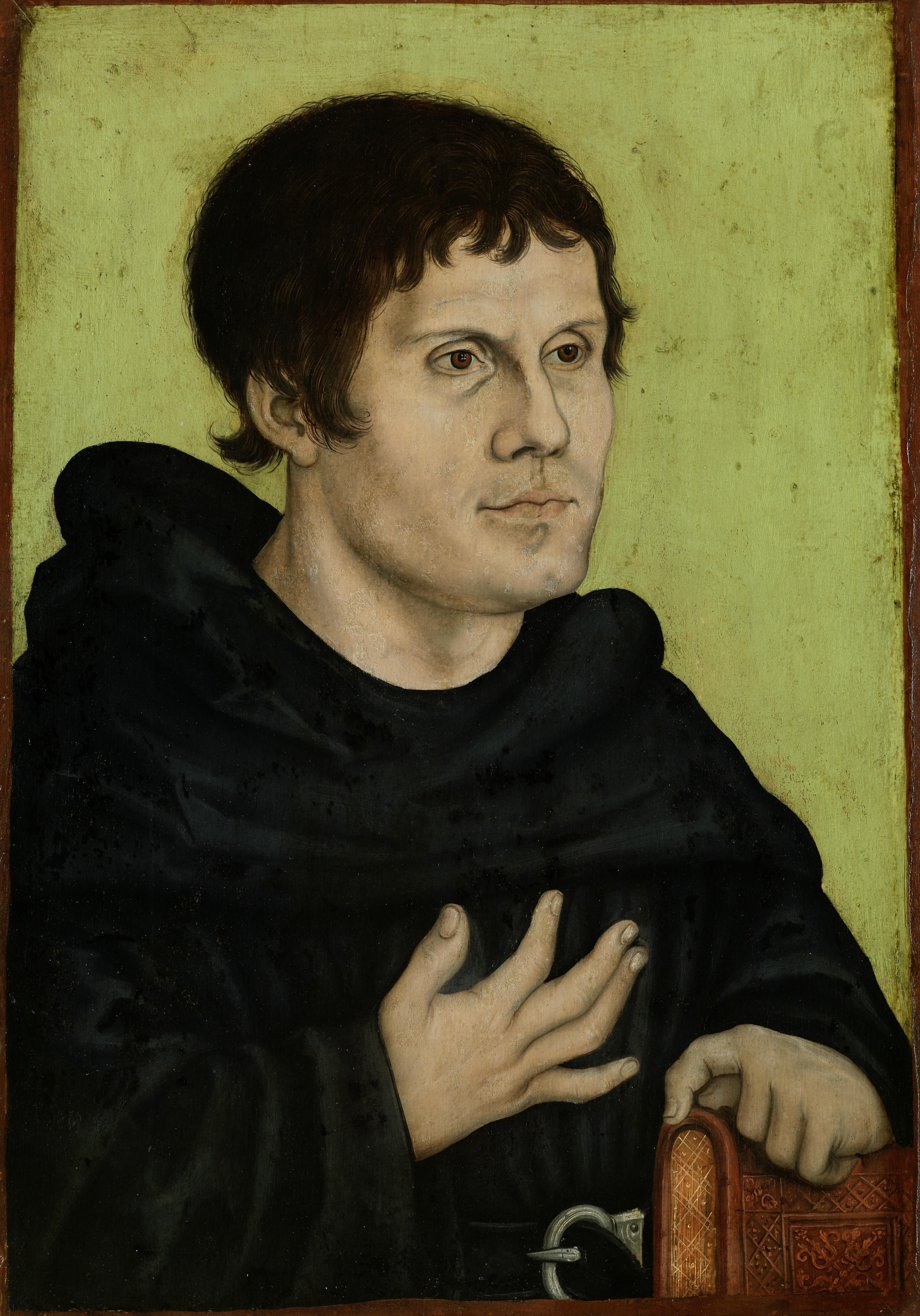
Portrait of Martin Luther as an Augustinian Monk

Martin Luther enrolled at the University of Erfurt in 1501, aged 17, and studied law and philosophy. He had a religious conversion on 2 July 1505 when he was returning to university after a visit to his parents in Eisleben during a violent thunderstorm. As he was passing through Stotternheim, on the outskirts of Erfurt, lightning struck. He was terrified that he would die and cried out "Help me, St. Anne, and I will become a monk." He survived the storm and kept his vow, immediately leaving university and joining St. Augustine's Monastery as a novice friar on 17 July 1505.

On 3 April 1507 he was ordained as a priest in Erfurt Cathedral, and said his first mass on 2 May 1507 in St Augustine's Church. In September 1508 Luther was sent to teach and study at Wittenberg University. He returned to St Augustine's in September 1509. In November 1510 Luther and another friar were sent to Rome. They walked the over 1300 km journey in about four weeks, reaching Rome in early December. They returned to St Augustine's in March 1511 and in September 1511 Luther left the friary permanently, to teach at Wittenberg.

In his later role as the provincial vicar of Saxony and Thuringia, from 1515, Luther continued to pay visits to St Augustine's and other monasteries. He delivered an historic sermon against the theology of the Catholic Church and the papacy to a crowd in St Augustine's Church on 7 April 1521, on his way to the Diet of Worms, an assembly to which he had been summoned to account for his teachings. He was declared a heretic on 26 May 1521.

==== The Luther Cell ====
The present-day 'Luther Cell' is a reconstruction of what is thought to be the third or fourth monastic cell that Luther had at St Augustine's, and the one he used after returning from Rome. Not long after his death in 1546, the cell became a site of veneration and pilgrimage. A fire in 1872 destroyed the interior of the upper storey of the former dormitory where the cell is located, but it was rebuilt in keeping with historical accuracy soon afterwards.

The cell was also damaged in World War II bombing. It was not repaired until after the war, by which time it had become damaged by water leaks. It was dismantled and rebuilt, with the window being made smaller.

=== The Reformation and after ===
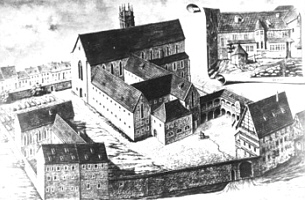
Augustinian Monastery, Erfurt in the 16th century

The Prior of the monastery from 1516 to 1522 was Johannes Lang (c. 1487–1548). He was one of Luther's closest collaborators and known as the 'Reformer of Erfurt', as it was he who prepared Erfurt and the surrounding districts for the Reformation, distributing Luther's texts and promoting his teachings. The city council supported the Reformation and the area was an early adopter of Protestantism. In 1522 together with many of the friars, Lang left the Order. In 1525, the Church of St. Augustine was withdrawn from the friary and used by the congregation of the newly formed Lutheran-Protestant church. The last of the friars died in 1556 and the friary became the property of Erfurt city council.

From 1561 the west wing of the friary and the priory were used as a school, which remained there until 1820. The friar's dormitory was converted into accommodation for the pupils. The monastic library lost material in the course of the Reformation, but in 1646, the Lutheran Library of the Evangelical Ministry moved into the building. A Protestant orphanage used part of the former monastery from 1669. In the middle of the 17th century, Augustinian friars settled in Erfurt again, but they lived at a different site. That friary closed in 1822.

=== 19th century ===
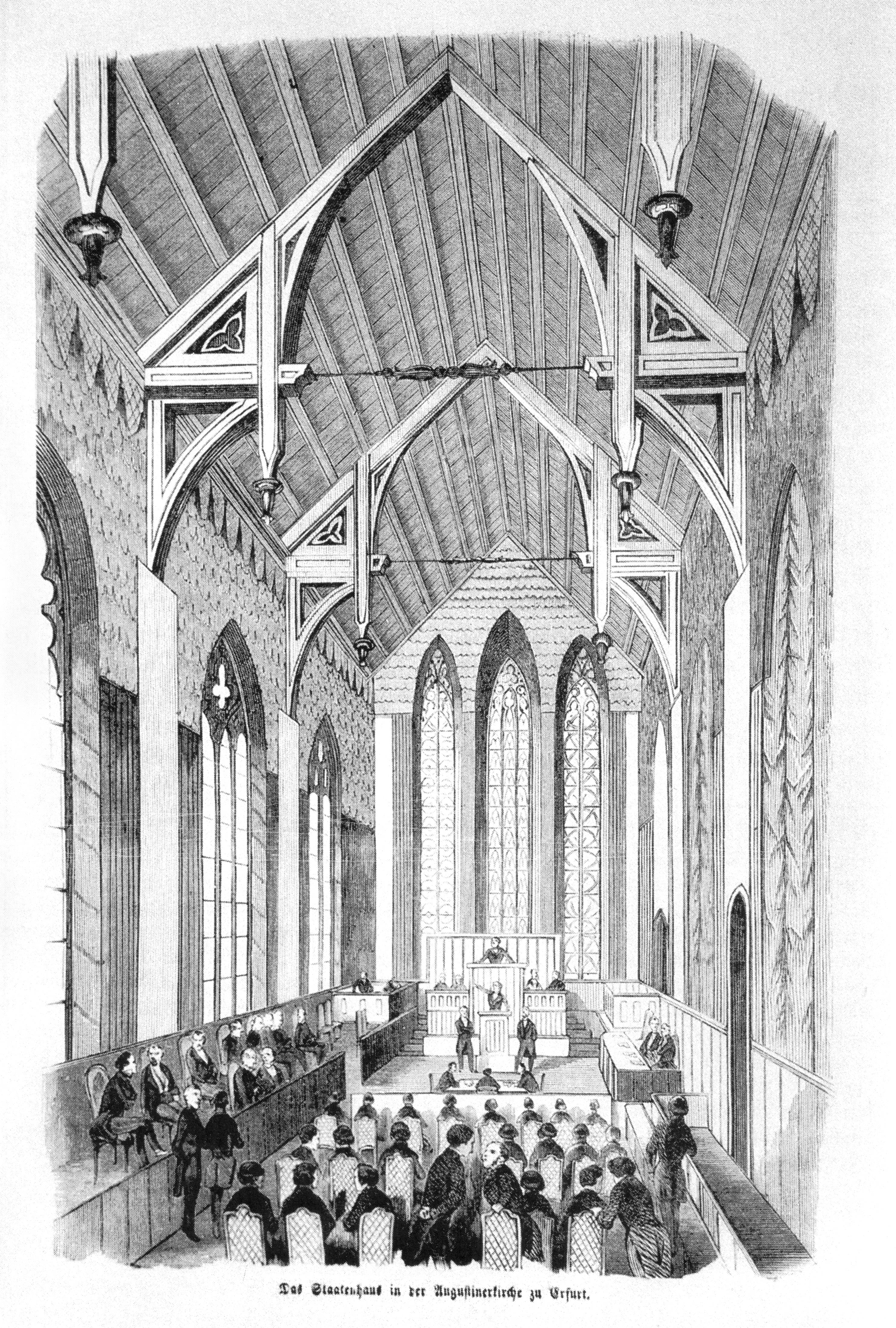
Erfurt Union Parliament in St. Augustine's church

The new priory building (which dated from the 14th century) was demolished in 1821, as it was dilapidated and there were no funds available to restore it. From this time the west wing of the monastery, together with the old priory, the library and the woad houses were used by the St. Martin's foundation, (German: the Martinsstift), a charity for the education of orphans and neglected children.

From 1840 to 1846, the western wing and the priory were renovated with architectural plans by Karl Friedrich Schinkel, which created a connection between the west wing and the library. This renovation and modernization was done in a rather piecemeal fashion; St. Augustine's Church itself had to be closed in 1844 due to dilapidation. A successful petition was made to King Frederick William IV of Prussia, who was a Lutheran, for funds to repair the church. In 1848 it was reconstructed in the neo-Gothic style.

From 20 March until 29 April 1850, the church was used for meetings of the parliament of the Erfurt Union, an unsuccessful attempt at a federation of German states. The unification of Germany did not happen until 1871.

The church was reconsecrated in 1854. In 1872, a fire destroyed the interior of upper story of the friar's dormitory, but the damage was repaired shortly afterwards.

=== 20th century ===
Between 1936 and 1938, reconstruction work was carried out on the 14th-century church and part of the friary under the direction of the architect Theo Kellner.

Towards the end of World War II, on 25 February 1945, the friary complex was considerably damaged in a British air raid. The library building and the woad houses were directly hit and destroyed. The blast of air pressure from the explosions caused all the remaining buildings, including the Augustinian church itself, to lose their roofs, windows and doors.

The four valuable 14th-century stained glass windows from the church were preserved, as they had been removed and stored in the village church in Hohenfelden, Bavaria. Likewise, many of the valuable books from the library had been stored for safety in village churches.

The basement of the friary library was a public air raid shelter, and many people were seeking refuge there at the time of the attack. There were 267 people who died in the air raid, including the church pastor.

From 1946 to 1957, the church, the cloister, the east wing and the guesthouse (the former friar's dormitory) were restored. In 1947, the four medieval church windows were reinstated. The organ was restored with spare parts from West Germany.

In 1960, the Evangelische Predigerschule, a Lutheran seminary, moved to the site, and remained there until 1993. In 1996, the first four sisters of the evangelical Communität Casteller Ring moved into rooms of the monastery, returning the building to a usage similar to what it had in the Middle Ages. However, the community withdrew from Erfurt at Easter 2011.

=== 21st century ===
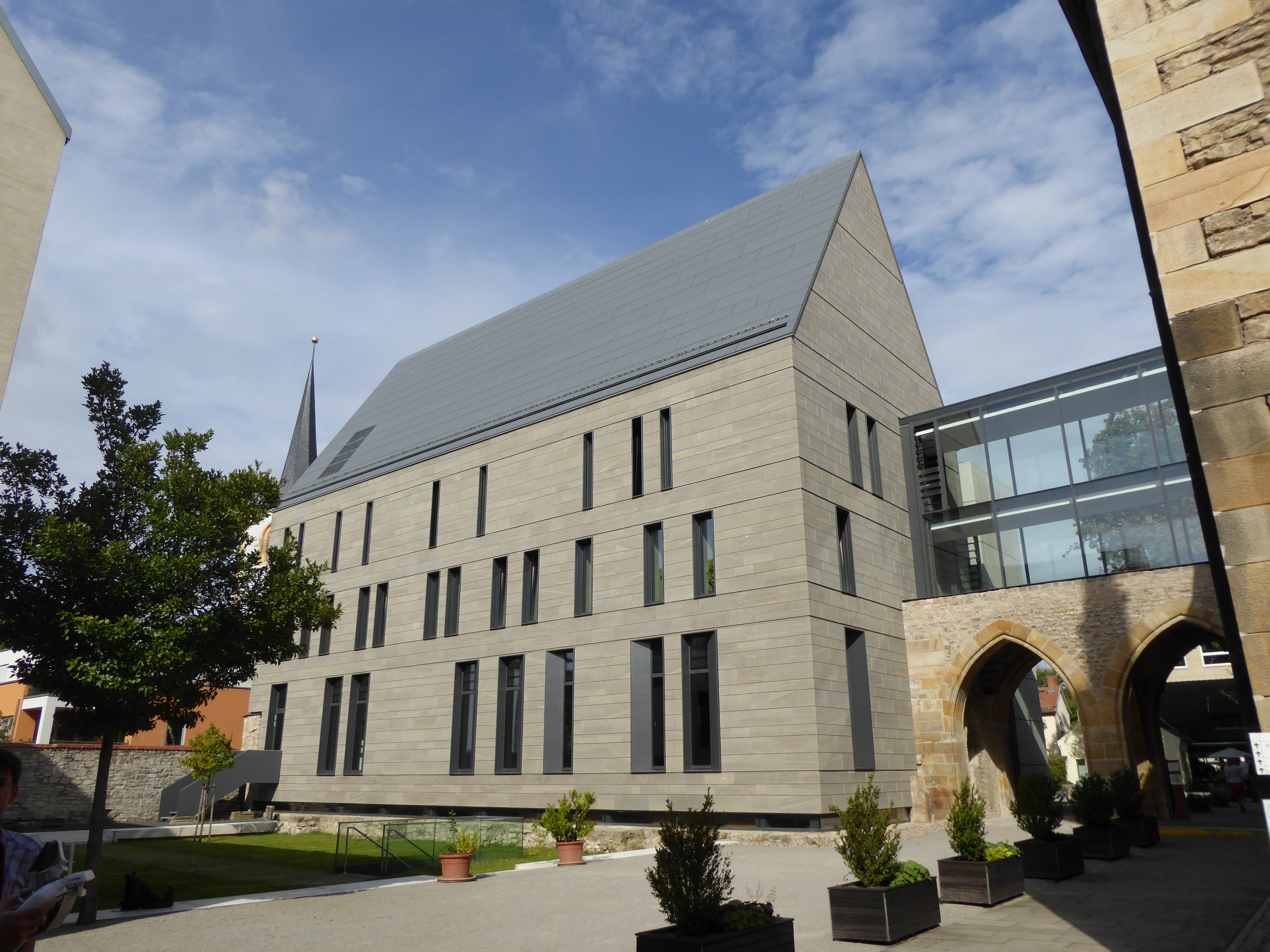
New library building at St. Augustine's Monastery, Erfurt

The Charitable Foundation of St. Augustine's Monastery in Erfurt (Stiftung Augustinerkloster zu Erfurt) was established in November 2003 by the Deutsche Stiftung Denkmalschutz. Its purpose is manage the preservation, restoration and reconstruction of the buildings. In the same year the extensive restoration of the cloister was completed.

In 2003, several scenes of the feature film Luther, starring Joseph Fiennes, were shot in the buildings of the monastery.

Work to restore the foundations of buildings destroyed in 1945 and expose their basements began in November 2006. In February 2008, the foundation stone was laid for the new library, which cost 5 million Euros. The building was officially opened on 27 August 2010. The Library of the Evangelical Ministry, with 60,000 volumes, one of the most important ecclesiastical collections in Germany, is housed in the monastery's former dormitory.

A "room of silence" in the basement of the new building recalls the 267 victims of the British air raid in February 1945. The building of the modern 'Waidhaus' on the foundations and cellar of the medieval Woad houses that were destroyed in World War II was done in consultation with the Thuringia department for monument protection and archaeology. It was opened on 14 September 2008 and contains 17 guest rooms and a meditation/training space in the former medieval cellar.

On 23 September 2011, Pope Benedict XVI visited the former Augustinian monastery as part of his papal visit to Germany.

In February 2016 an application was made to have St. Augustine's Monastery, along with 11 other sites, added to the UNESCO World Heritage Site designated 'Luther Sites in Central Germany'. The designation was initially awarded in December 1996 to the Luther sites in Eisleben and Wittenberg. A decision is pending.

== Gallery ==
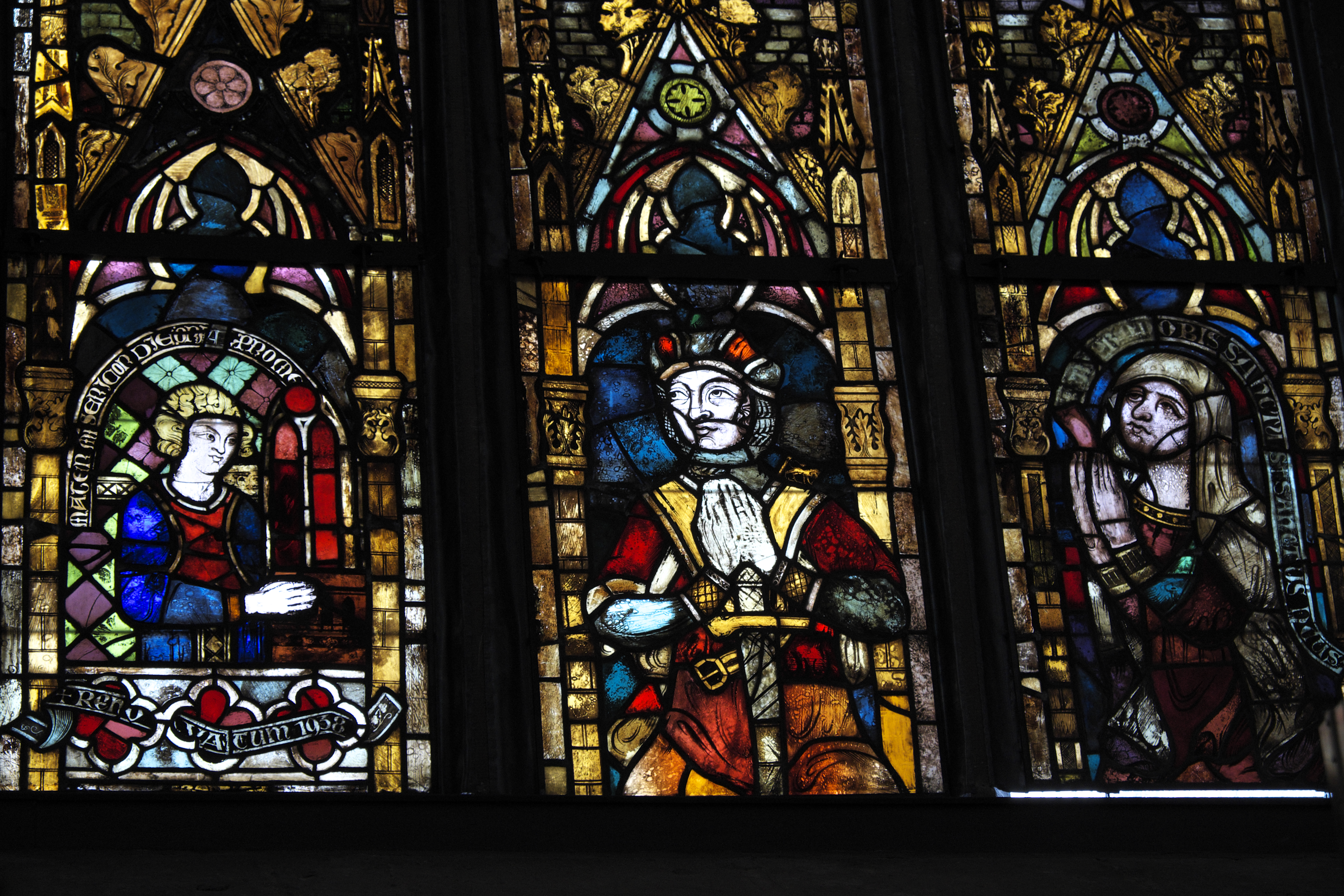
Stained glass windows c.1310-1340, St. Augustine's Church

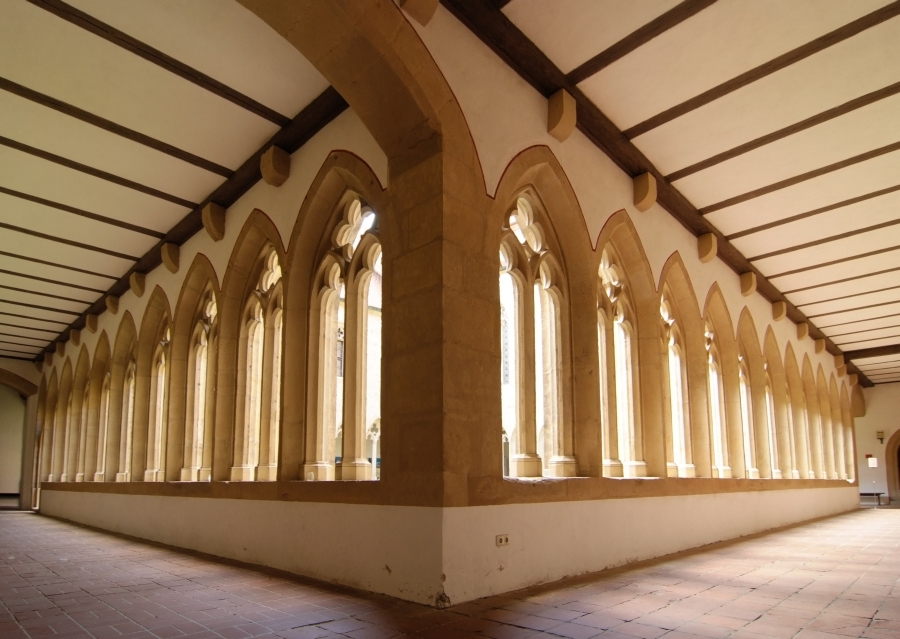
Cloister at St. Augustine's, Erfurt

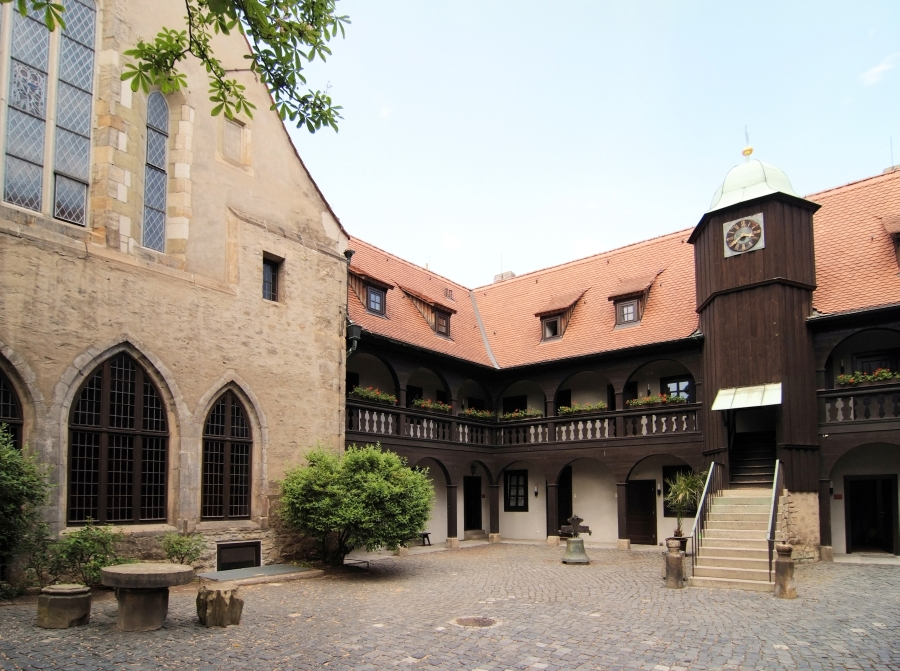
A courtyard at St. Augustine's, Erfurt, by Martina Nolte

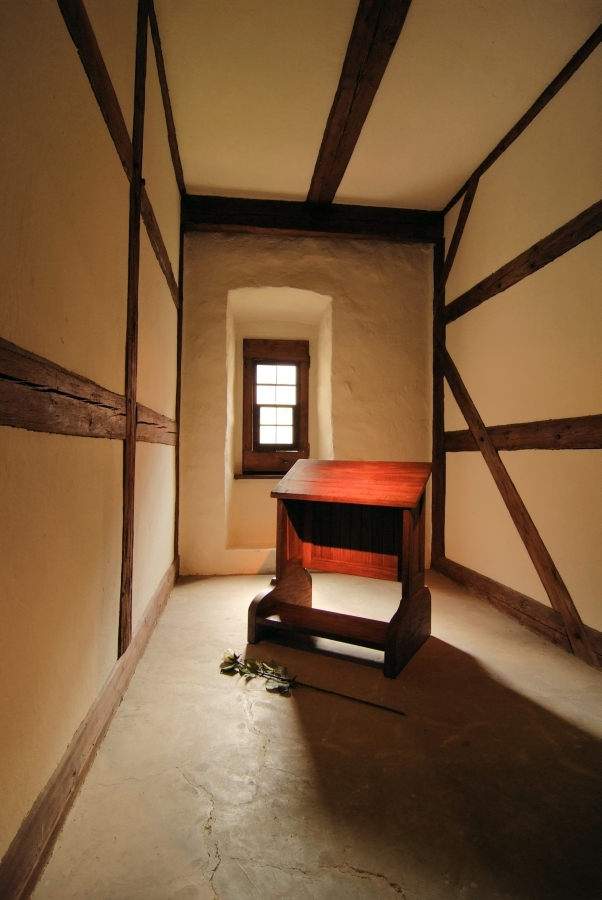
The 'Luther cell' at St. Augustine's, Erfurt by Martina Nolte

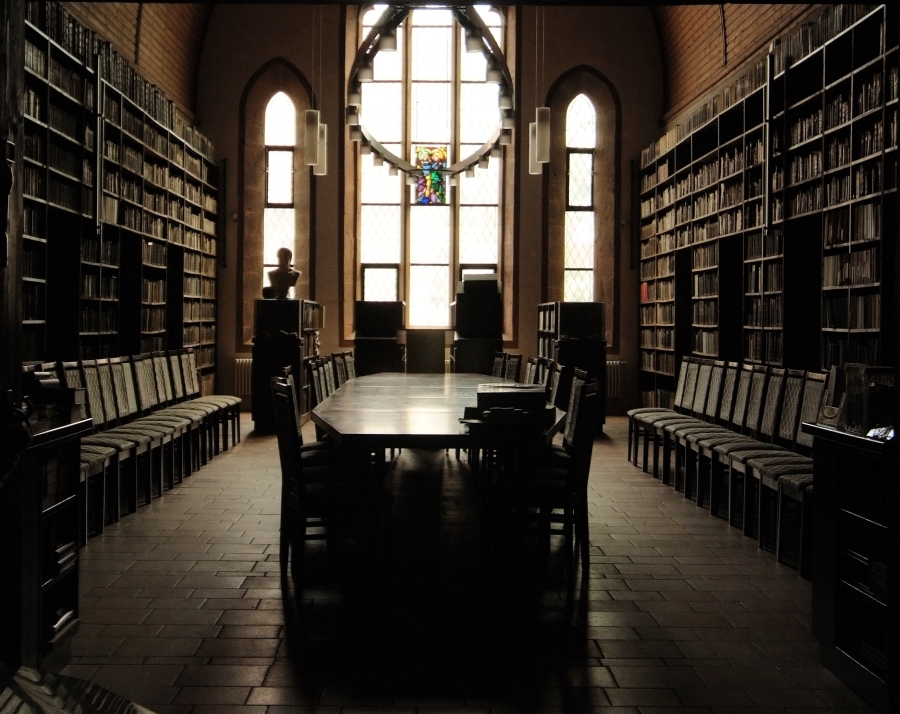
The historical library of the Evangelical Ministry, by Martina Nolte

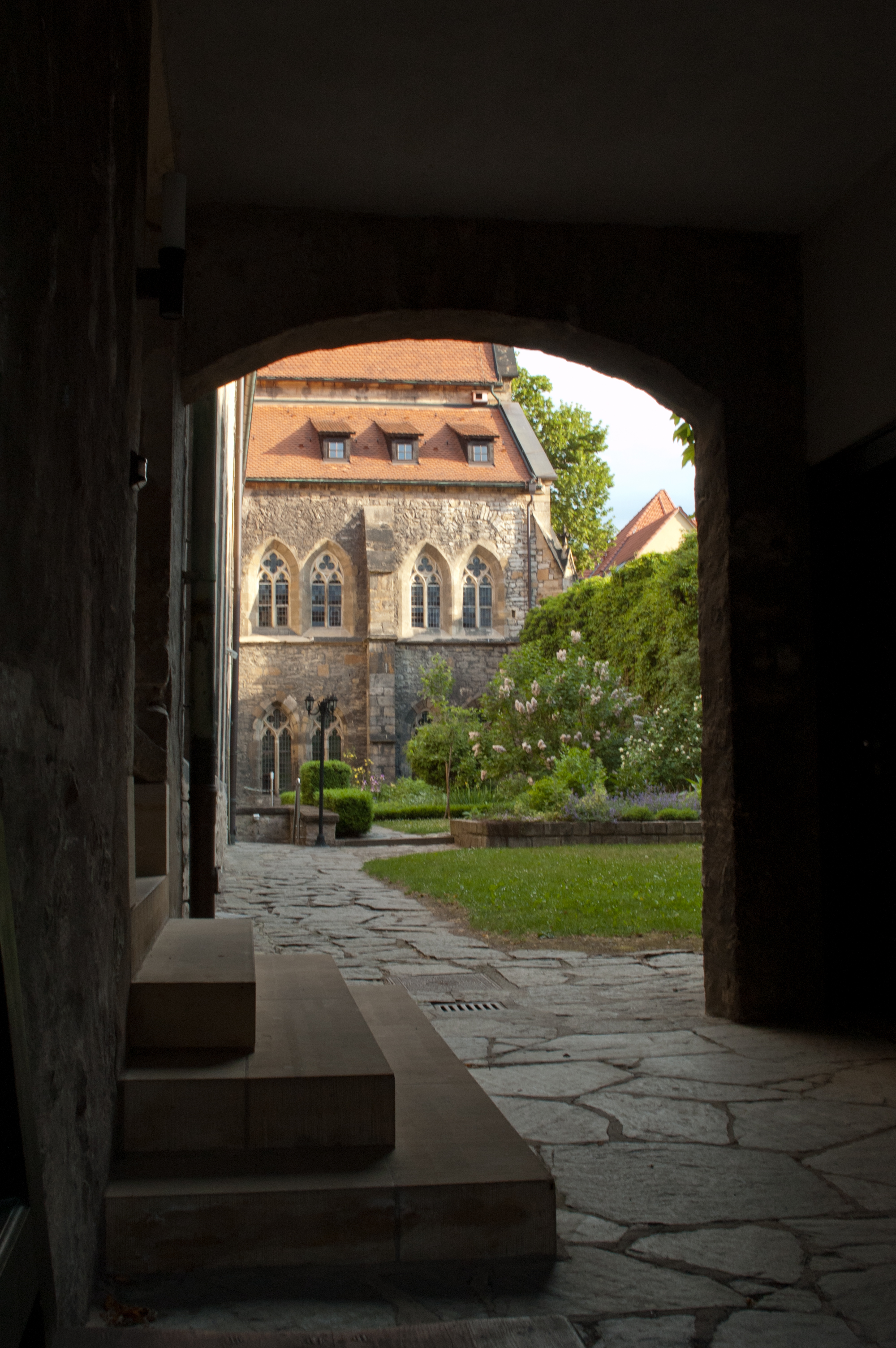
Portal, St. Augustine's, Erfurt

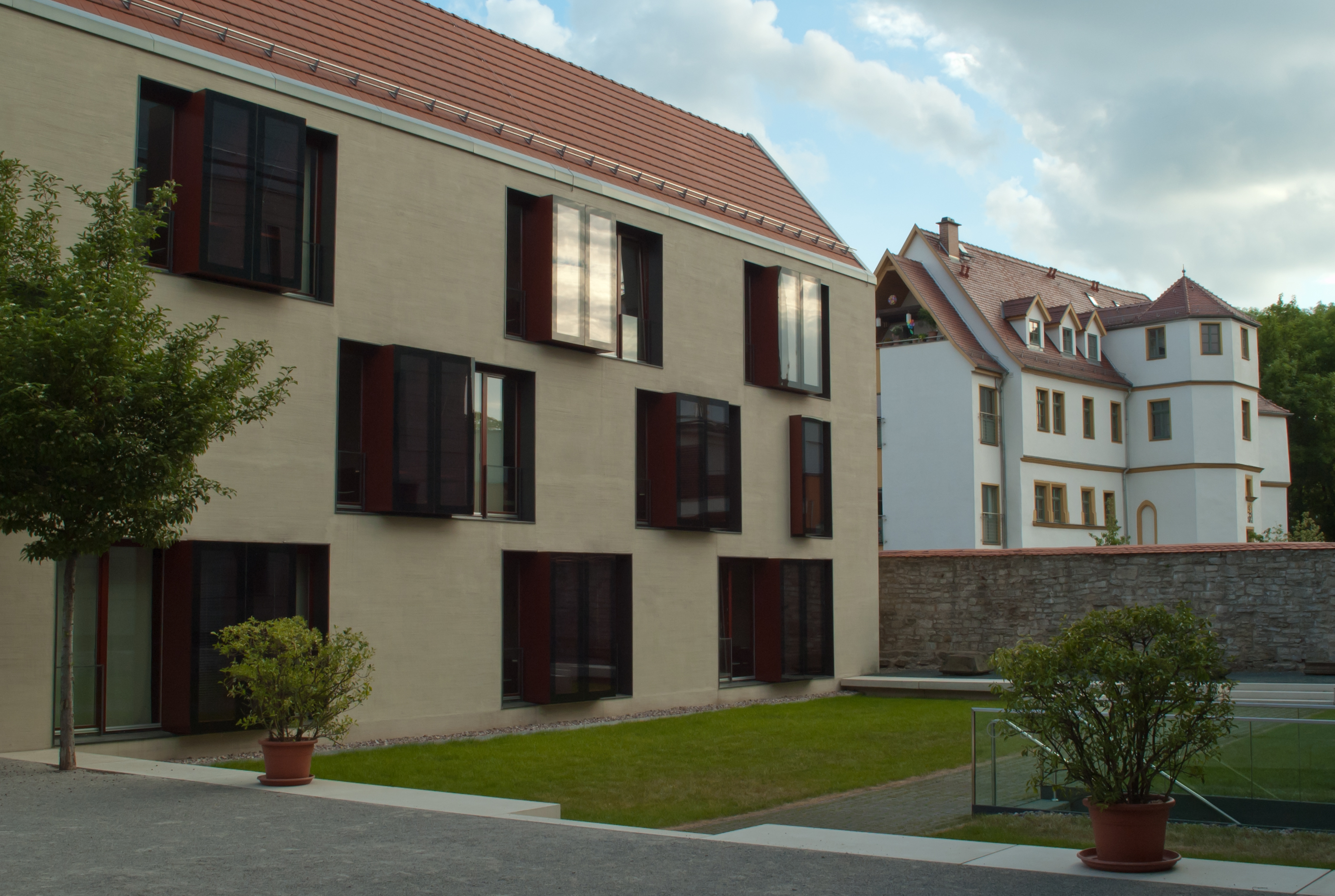
'Waidhaus' Guest House, St. Augustine's, Erfurt

== See also ==
- Henry of Friemar the Younger
