= Möller manuscript =

The Möller manuscript is a compilation of keyboard music made by Johann Christoph Bach (1671–1721), the eldest brother of Johann Sebastian Bach and organist in Ohrdruf. It is named after its former owner, Johann Gottfried Möller (1774–1833), born in Ohrdruf. It is one of two extant compilations of J. C. Bach, the other being the Andreas-Bach-Buch. It is written in careful calligraphy, a smaller part in keyboard tablature.

Johann Christoph Bach took Johann Sebastian and his older brother Johann Jacob into his home after they were orphaned in 1695, and was Johann Sebastian's first keyboard teacher.

The knowledge of the early keyboard works of Johann Sebastian Bach has come to a considerable extent from this manuscript, together with the Andreas-Bach-Buch. It is archived in the Staatsbibliothek in Berlin. It was compiled in the years 1704-1707, and contains 12 pieces by the young J. S. Bach, written in the early years of the 18th century, as well as music by some of the most famous German composers of the time, such as Georg Böhm, Nicolaus Bruhns, Dietrich Buxtehude, Johann Adam Reinken and Friedrich Wilhelm Zachow. In addition there are transcriptions of orchestral music by, for example, the 17th century French master Jean-Baptiste Lully.

Johann Sebastian likely had a considerable influence on the way the collection was put together. Therefore, the manuscript gives insight into the kind of music that he was interested in and which influenced his composing.

Some of the pieces in the manuscript are not known from any other source, such as the short 'Gigue belle' by Werner Fabricius. Also for some of J. S. Bach's works the manuscript is the only source, and in some cases it is the most reliable source of pieces which are otherwise only extant in copies of a much later date.
