= Gerhard of Sterngassen =

German Thomist philosopher

Gerhard of Sterngassen was a German Thomist philosopher. He was the brother of John of Sterngassen.
