= Johann Christoph Bach (disambiguation) =

Johann Christoph Bach (1642–1703) was a German composer and organist of the Baroque period.

Johann Christoph Bach may also refer to:

- Johann Christoph Bach (musician at Arnstadt) (1645–1693), musician, J.S. Bach's uncle
- Johann Christoph Bach (organist at Ohrdruf) (1671–1721), J.S. Bach's eldest brother
- Johann Christoph Friedrich Bach (1732–1795), composer, son of J.S. Bach
