= Andreas-Bach-Buch =

Early 18th-century manuscript collection

Andreas-Bach-Buch (Andreas Bach Book), named after one of its owners, Johann Andreas Bach is a manuscript collection of 57 keyboard pieces, compiled by Johann Christoph Bach from Ohrdruf, the elder brother of Johann Sebastian Bach. The collection dates from the years 1704 to 1714, but includes older pieces. It is held in the music library of the Stadtbibliothek Leipzig (Municipal Library Leipzig).

This manuscript contains 15 compositions by J. S. Bach and is one of the important sources for many North German composers, for example Johann Adam Reincken, Dieterich Buxtehude and Georg Böhm who are the great masters in the training of Bach. Johann Christoph Bach left another collection, the Möller manuscript (Möllersche Handschrift) after its owner, Johann Godfried Möller (1774–1833) – born in Ohrdruf – and which contains almost as many pieces, copied between 1704 and 1707. These manuscripts are together the two main sources for Bach's early compositions and contain the only sources of some works, including six by Buxtehude.
