= Georg Christoph Bach =

German composer (1642–1697)

Georg Christoph Bach (6 September 1642 – 27 April 1697) was a German composer. He was the son of Christoph Bach and the elder brother of Johann Sebastian Bach's father Johann Ambrosius Bach.

== Life ==
Georg Christoph Bach was born in Erfurt, Germany, in 1642. He was trained in music in Arnstadt and attended the Casimirianum in Coburg and later Leipzig University. In 1668, he became cantor and organist in Themar, and from 1688 until his death he was the cantor at St. Johannis in Schweinfurt, where his uncles Johann and Heinrich Bach had been organists.

== Works ==
His most well known work is Siehe, wie fein und lieblich ist es for two tenors, bass, violin, three gambas and continuo. It was composed on his 47th birthday and a visit to Schweinfurt by his two younger twin brothers. Four of his chorale cantatas are extant, on the hymns "Vom Himmel hoch, da komm ich her", "O wie selig seid ihr doch, ihr Frommen", "O Haupt voll Blut und Wunden", and "Meinen Jesum laß ich nicht". A Schweinfurt inventory of 1689 lists three other vocal works: Gott ist unsere Zuversicht, Wie lieblich sind auf den Bergen and Wohl her, lasset uns wohl leben.

== See also ==
- Bach family
- Altbachisches Archiv
