= Johann Georg Bach =

German organist

Johann Georg Bach (30 September 1751 – 12 April 1797) was a German organist.

A member of the Bach family, he was born in Eisenach, the son of Johann Ernst Bach. From 1777 he was organist at Georgenkirche in Eisenach, where he died.
