= Christoph Bach (musician) =

German musician, grandfather of J. S. Bach

- Born: 29 April [O.S. 19 April] 1613; Wechmar, Saxe-Weimar, Holy Roman Empire
- Died: 22 September [O.S. 12 September] 1661
- Occupation: Musician
- Spouse: Maria Magdalena Grabler

Christoph Bach (29 April [O.S. 19 April] 1613 – 22 September [O.S. 12 September] 1661) was a German musician of the Baroque period. He was the grandfather of Johann Sebastian Bach.

According to information provided by Johann Sebastian Bach in his genealogy Origin of the Musical Bach Family written in 1735, Christoph Bach was the second son of Johannes Bach I. His brothers, Johann Bach and Heinrich Bach, were also composers.

He was born in Wechmar, Germany, where he became a court musician. He also held town musician posts in Erfurt and in Arnstadt. Christoph Bach married Maria Magdalena Grabler. They had three sons, who were all musicians: Georg Christoph Bach (1642–1697), and the twins Johann Ambrosius Bach (1645–1695), who was Johann Sebastian Bach's father, and Johann Christoph Bach (1645–1693). Christoph Bach died in Arnstadt.

== See also ==
- Bach Family
