= Maria Elisabeth Lämmerhirt =

Mother of Johann Sebastian Bach (1644–1694)

Maria Elisabeth Lämmerhirt (24 February 1644, Erfurt – 1 May 1694, Eisenach) was the mother of Johann Sebastian Bach.

== Life and career ==
She was a daughter of Valentin Lämmerhirt (or Lemmerhirt, 1605–1665), a furrier and coachman in Erfurt, and Eva Barbara Lämmerhirt (d. 1673). On 8 April 1668, she married her friend since childhood, Johann Ambrosius Bach. The couple were devout Lutherans. Her high social position in the city was said to benefit her husband's musical career. The couple left Erfurt in 1671 and settled in Eisenach, where in 1685 their eighth son, Johann Sebastian Bach, was born. In addition to taking care of her family, there were also generally three music apprentices between the ages of 15-20 in the home.

Although Bach biographers typically highlight the father's Bach family musical lineage, his mother's Lämmerhirt side also produced several musicians, including Johann Heinrich Buttstett (a distant relative) and music theorist Johann Gottfried Walther (a cousin via Lämmerhirt's half-sister Martha Dorothea).
