= Henry of Friemar the Younger =

Henry of Friemar the Younger (born at Friemar, a small town near Gotha in Thuringia c. 1285, died 21 April 1354 in Erfurt) was a German Augustinian theologian. He should be distinguished from Henry of Friemar the Elder (c. 1245-1340).

At an early age he entered the Order of Hermits of Saint Augustine, and was sent to the University of Paris. He graduated from there in 1321, and then worked as a Provincial from 1328 to 1336 for Thuringia and Saxony. Later (1342-1350) he served as Magister regens in the monastery of St. Thomas, Prague. Until his death in 1354 he lived, together with his namesake Heinrich von Friemar (the elder), in St. Augustine's Monastery in Erfurt.

His printed works are:

- Opus Sermonum Exactissimorum De Sanctis
- De Quadruplici Instinctu, Divino, Angelico, Diabolico, et Humano (Venice, 1498; Parma, 1514) (Treatise on the Four Impulses)
- Additiones Ad Libros Sententiarum (Cologne, 1513)
- De Spiritibus, Eorumque Discretione
- Tractatus De Beatae, Mariae Virginis Conceptione (Louvain, 1664)
- De Origine Fratrum Eremitarum Sancti Augustini.
