= Johann Gottfried Bernhard Bach =

German organist, child of J.S. Bach (1715–1739)

Johann Gottfried Bernhard Bach (11 May 1715 – 27 May 1739) was a German musician. It is not known whether he composed, and his career as an organist is not in itself notable, but his life throws light on his famous father, Johann Sebastian Bach. Johann Gottfried was the fourth child of Johann Sebastian and Maria Barbara Bach to reach adulthood.

== Early life ==
He was born in Weimar, where his father was employed until 1717, when the family moved to Köthen. His mother died in Köthen in 1720 and his father remarried the next year.

== Education ==
In 1723, J.S. Bach was appointed Thomaskantor in Leipzig. He is believed to have moved to Leipzig partly because of the educational opportunities there for his sons. J.G.B. Bach attended the Thomasschule, where his father was responsible for the musical education that was an important part of the curriculum. He also studied privately with his father.

== Musical career ==
In contrast to his elder brothers Wilhelm Friedemann and Carl Philipp Emanuel, Johann Gottfried did not get the opportunity to study at Leipzig University after finishing school. Like his father before him, he auditioned for posts as a musician. He first served as organist at the Marienkirche, the largest church in Mühlhausen in 1735. His father had been employed at Divi Blasii, Mühlhausen's other main church in 1707–1708, and, despite the brevity of his stay, was well regarded by the town council, carrying out commissions for them after moving to Weimar. He was succeeded as organist by one of his cousins.

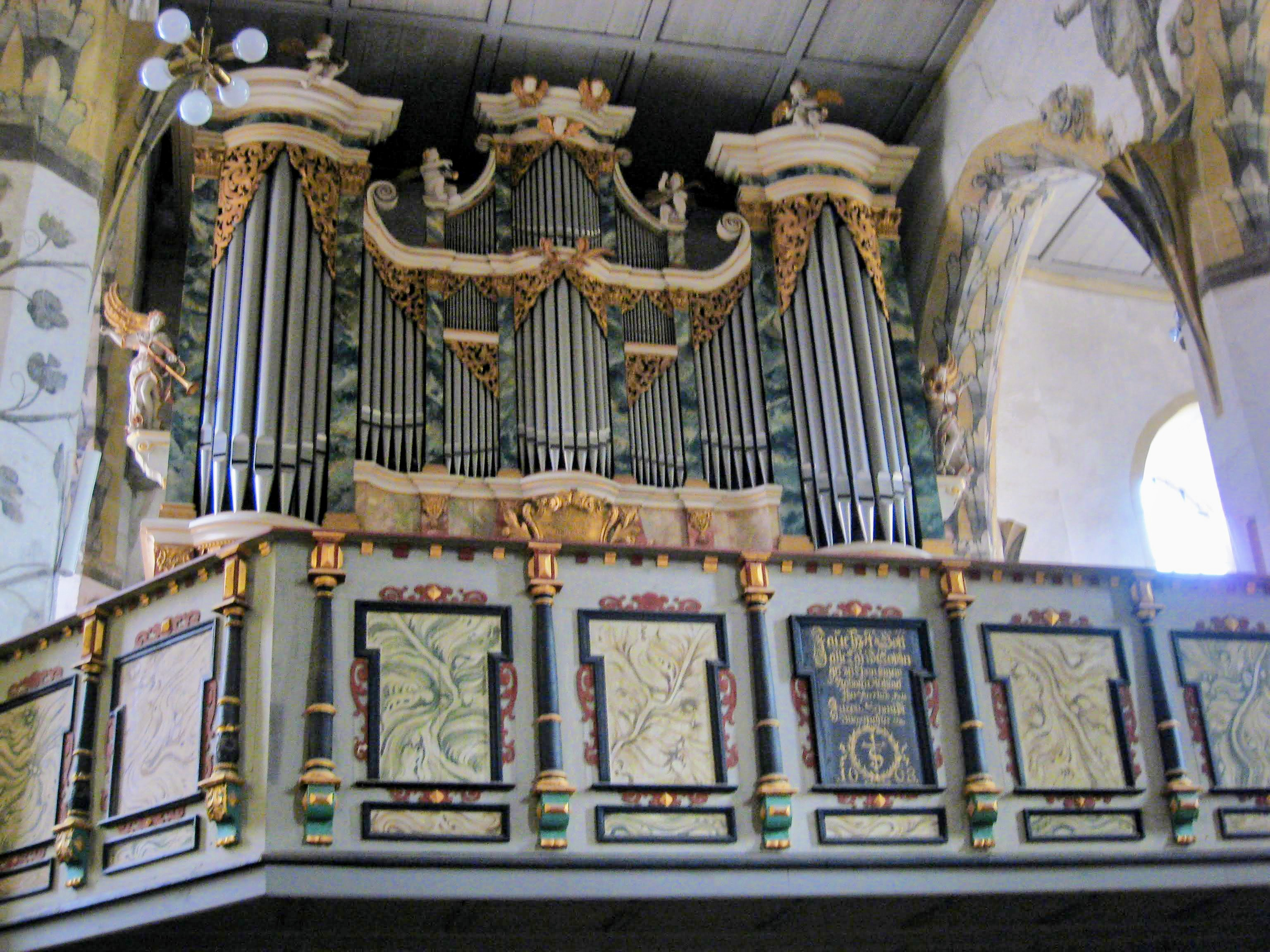
The organ of the Jakobikirche in Sangerhausen

Johann Gottfried also only spent a short time in Mühlhausen, moving in 1737 to find a new engagement as organist at the Jakobikirche in Sangerhausen. It was a post for which his father had applied as a young man. A new organ by Zacharias Hildebrandt had since been installed.

By 1738, Johann Gottfried was burdened with debt and abandoned his musical career to study law in Jena. There he died prematurely at age 24.
