= Johann Aegidius Bach =

Johann Aegidius Bach (9 February 1645 – November 1716) was a German organist, violist, and municipal orchestra director of Erfurt. He was Johann Sebastian Bach's 1st cousin once removed, Johannes Bach's son, and the father of composer Johann Bernhard Bach. He was a viola player and performer in the Stadtmusikanten Kompagnie (municipal musicians band) in Erfurt. He was organist at the Kaufmannskirche and the Michaeliskirche; on 30 June 1682 he was named the director of the Ratsmusik (city council music).

== See also ==
- Bach family
