= Johann Nicolaus Bach (violist) =

German violist (1653–1682)

Johann Nicolaus Bach (baptised February 5, 1653 in Erfurt, Germany) was the son of Johann(es) [Hans] Bach. He died of the plague in Erfurt, Germany, on July 30, 1682, at the age of 29. He died just one month before the birth of his only son, Johann Nicolaus Bach Jr., who was born on August 31, 1682.

He was a Baroque musician and virtuoso Viola De Gamba player.

From 1673 until his death, he was a very active musician in his hometown of Erfurt, Germany. Bach was hired to play the Viol, or Viola De Gamba, an instrument he was said to be a prodigy on.
