= Johann Christoph Bach (organist at Ohrdruf) =

German musician (1671–1721)

Johann Christoph Bach (16 June 1671 – 22 February 1721) was a musician of the Bach family. He was the eldest of the brothers of Johann Sebastian Bach who survived childhood.

== Life ==
Christoph was born in Erfurt, on 16 June 1671, a few months before the family moved to Eisenach, where Johann Sebastian was born fourteen years later as the last child. In 1686, Johann Christoph was sent to Erfurt to study under Johann Pachelbel for the next three years. By the end of his apprenticeship he was organist in the St. Thomas church in that town for a short time, followed by some months at Arnstadt where several Bach relatives lived.

In 1690, Johann Christoph became organist at the Michaeliskirche at Ohrdruf. In October 1694, he married Dorothea von Hof. His mother Maria Elisabeth Lämmerhirt had died earlier that year, and his father Johann Ambrosius Bach died in March the next year. Two younger brothers, Johann Jacob and Johann Sebastian, who up till then had been living with their father in Eisenach, came to live with Johann Christoph's family in Ohrdruf. At the time, Johann Jacob was thirteen, and Johann Sebastian not even ten. Johann Christoph's five sons were born between 1695 and 1713.

Johann Christoph became his youngest brother's keyboard teacher, or, at least, Johann Sebastian "laid the foundations of his [own] keyboard technique" under the guidance of his eldest brother. An anecdote is told by Johann Sebastian's early biographers:

The most renowned Clavier composers of that day were Froberger, Fischer, Johann Caspar Kerl, Pachelbel, Buxtehude, Bruhns, and Böhm. Johann Christoph possessed a book containing several pieces by these masters, and [Johann Sebastian] Bach begged earnestly for it, but without effect. Refusal increasing his determination, he laid his plans to get the book without his brother's knowledge. It was kept on a book-shelf which had a latticed front. Bach's hands were small. Inserting them, he got hold of the book, rolled it up, and drew it out. As he was not allowed a candle, he could only copy it on moonlight nights, and it was six months before he finished his heavy task. As soon as it was completed he looked forward to using in secret a treasure won by so much labour. But his brother found the copy and took it from him without pity, nor did Bach recover it until his brother's death soon after.

The brother had however not died "soon after". Having stayed with his brother for five years Johann Sebastian left Ohrdruf, joining the choir of St. Michael's Convent at Lüneburg. Around the time Johann Sebastian left Lüneburg a few years later he composed a Capriccio in E major in honor of his eldest brother, BWV 993. In the years that followed, Johann Christoph copied several compositions by his younger brother, such as those in the Andreas Bach Book, kept by one of his sons, and the Möller Manuscript.

All of Johann Christoph's sons became musicians, three of them at Ohrdruf. He died on 22 February 1721, aged 49, in Ohrdruf.

== Family ==
Johann Christoph Bach was married Dorothea von Hof. They had nine children:

- Tobias Friedrich Bach (1695–1768), Court cantor in Gandersheim, organist in Pferdingsleben, 1722–1768 Cantor in Udestedt), in 1722 got married Susanna Elisabeth Wolckner (1699–1753), had four children.
- Christiana Sophia Bach (1697–1725), in 1722 got married Johann Christian Happe (1689–1761)
- Johann Bernhard Bach (1700–1743); organist at St. Michaelis in Ohrdruf
- Johann Christoph Bach (1702–1756); teacher and cantor in Ohrdruf
- Johanna Maria Bach (1705–1742)
- Johann Heinrich Bach (1707–1783); organist and teacher in Öhringen
- Magdalena Elisabetha Bach (1710–1789), was married Ludwig Gottfried Möller (1700–1777)
- Johann Andreas Bach (1713–1779); teacher and organist in Ohrdruf

== Sources ==
- Charles Sanford Terry. Johann Sebastian Bach: His Life, Art, and Work. Translated from the German of Johann Nikolaus Forkel. With notes and appendices by Charles Sanford Terry. New York: Harcourt, Brace and Howe. 1920.
- Philipp Spitta. Johann Sebastian Bach: His Work and Influence on the Music of Germany (1685–1750), translated by Clara Bell and J. A. Fuller Maitland. Volume I, 1899.
