= Maria Barbara Bach =

First wife of composer Johann Sebastian Bach

Maria Barbara Bach (30 October [O.S. 20 October] 1684 – buried 7 July 1720) was a German singer and the first wife of composer Johann Sebastian Bach. She was also the daughter of his father's cousin Johann Michael Bach.

== Life ==
Maria Barbara Bach was born at Gehren, Schwarzburg-Sondershausen, to Catherina (d. 1704) and Michael Bach (1648–1694). Her father was organist and town scribe at Gehren. Her older sister, Barbara Catherina, gave testimony on Johann Sebastian's behalf in the famous "Geyersbach" incident, in which Bach was struck in the face by a student, and defended himself by drawing his sword. Her godparents were Martin Feldhaus, a merchant and burgomaster in Arnstadt, and Magarethe Wedermann (daughter of the Arnstadt town scribe Johann Wedemann), with whom she lived after her mother's death in 1704.

Maria Barbara married Johann Sebastian Bach when she was twenty-three years old. The extended Bach family was closely knit, and as Maria Barbara was his second cousin, it is fairly safe to assume that they knew each other at least casually from childhood. They became close during Bach's tenure as organist of Mühlhausen's St. Blasius Church, and were able to marry at Dornheim on 17 October 1707, thanks to an inheritance of fifty gulden (more than half his annual salary) which he received from his maternal uncle, Tobias Lämmerhirt. Little is known of her life or their marriage, except that they were contented.

According to the Nekrolog ("obituary") co-authored by Carl Philipp Emanuel and Bach student Johann Friedrich Agricola, Maria Barbara's death in 1720 was sudden and unexpected. Bach was at the Carlsbad spa accompanying his employer, Prince Leopold of Anhalt-Köthen, when she died. When Bach left Köthen, Maria Barbara was in perfectly good health; but when he returned two months later, he was shocked to learn that she had died and been buried on 7 July. The cause of her death is undocumented. Professor Helga Thoene proposed that Bach's famous Violin Partita No. 2 (especially the final "Chaconne" movement) was written as a tombeau for Maria Barbara. However, these claims are controversial.

Johann and Maria Barbara had seven children, three of whom died in infancy:

- Catharina Dorothea (28 December 1708 – 14 January 1774)
- Wilhelm Friedemann (22 November 1710 – 1 July 1784)
- Johann Christoph (23 February 1713 – 23 February 1713)
- Maria Sophia (23 February 1713 – 15 March 1713), twin of Johann Christoph
- Carl Philipp Emanuel (8 March 1714 – 14 December 1788)
- Johann Gottfried Bernhard (11 May 1715 – 27 May 1739)
- Leopold Augustus (15 November 1718 – 29 September 1719)

Anna Magdalena Wilcke became Johann's second wife 17 months after Maria Barbara's death and raised her stepchildren along with her own children with Johann Sebastian Bach.
