= Johann Christoph Bach (musician at Arnstadt) =

German composer (1645–1693)

Johann Christoph Bach (22 February 1645 in Erfurt – 7 September [O.S. 28 August] 1693 in Arnstadt) was a German musician of the Baroque period.

He was the third son of Christoph Bach and the twin brother of Johann Ambrosius Bach. At the age of 16, he was orphaned due to the death of his father and was sent to Erfurt to live with his uncle Johannes Bach. Shortly thereafter, Johann was appointed to the town band his father had belonged to. In 1671, Johann Christoph received an appointment as court violinist at the Arnstadt court. Disputes arose within the Stadmusikus Gräder (city musicians) due to Bach's frequent tendency to anger the older musicians, and he was promptly fired. Shortly after, the sovereign Anton Günther I died, which induced a ban on all public music. Bach found himself in great need. However, at the beginning of 1682, he was reinstated at court by the new ruler Count Günther von Schwarzburg – Arnstadt. He was the uncle of Johann Sebastian Bach, and is credited with introducing him to the organ. He married Martha Elisabeth Eisentraut (1654–1719). In 1693, Johann died at age 48.

The funeral aria Nun ist alles überwunden is commonly attributed to him.
