= Günthersleben-Wechmar =

Former municipality and part of Drei Gleichen, Gotha, Thuringia, Germany

- Municipality
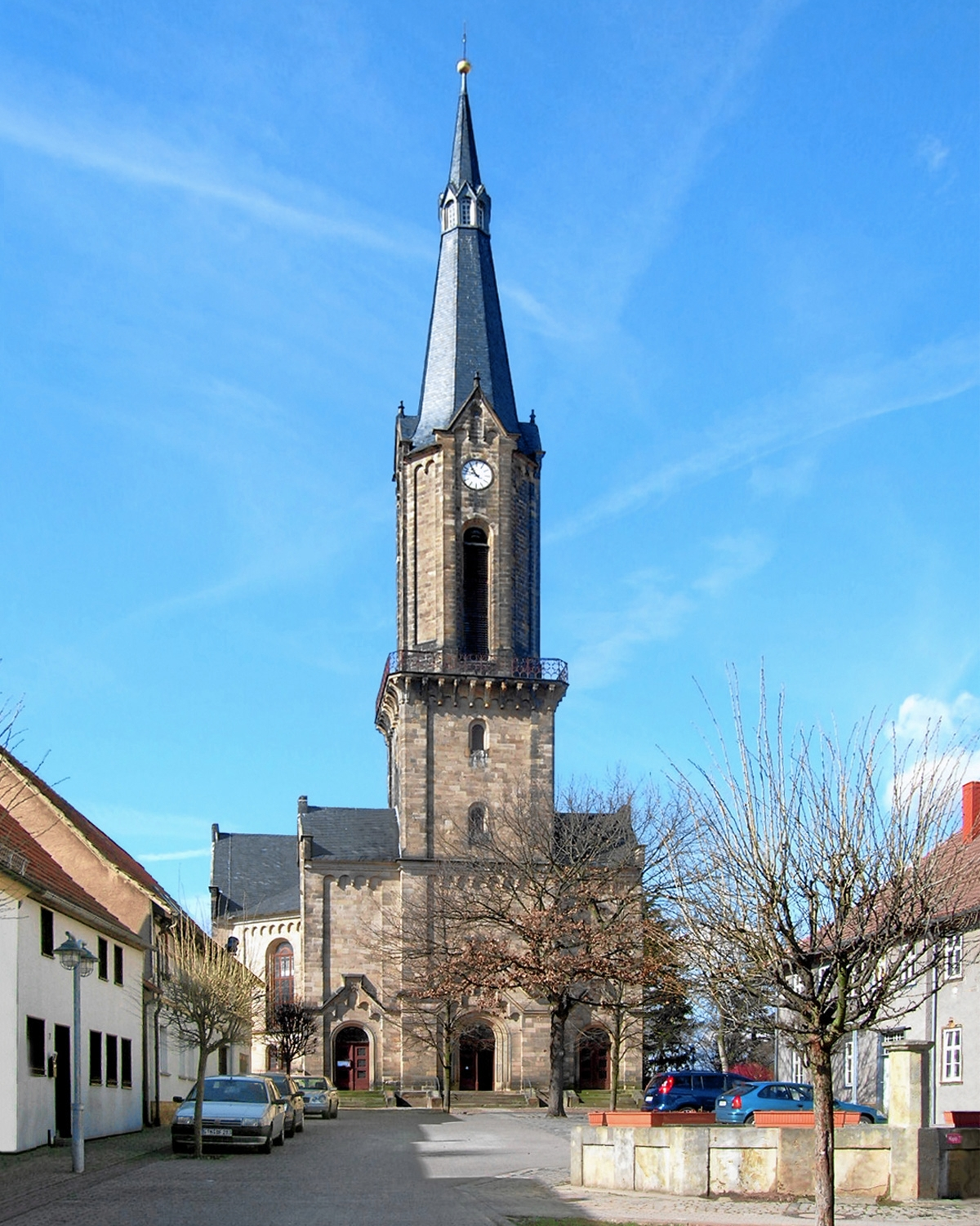

- Coat of arms
- Interactive map of Günthersleben-Wechmar
- Location within Germany Location within Thuringia
- Coordinates: 50°54′0″N 10°46′30″E
- Country: Germany
- State: Thuringia
- District: Gotha
- Disbanded: 2018

Area
  - Total: 26.80 km^{2} (10.35 sq mi)
- Elevation: 303 m (994 ft)

Population (2016-12-31)
  - Total: 2,999
  - Density: 111.9/km^{2} (289.8/sq mi)
- Time zone: UTC+01:00 (CET)
  - Summer (DST): UTC+02:00 (CEST)
- Postal codes: 99869
- Dialling codes: 036256
- Vehicle registration: GTH
- Website: www.wechmar-bach.de

Günthersleben-Wechmar is a former municipality in the German state (Bundesland) of Thuringia in the district of Gotha. Since July 2018, it is part of the municipality Drei Gleichen. The village of Wechmar is notable for having been the home of the Bach family of musicians and composers.

== Geography ==
The A4, one of Germany's primary east-to-west Autobahnen, is located adjacent to Günthersleben-Wechmar. Its proximity to the nearby district capital of Gotha, which itself is one of a whole chain of cities and towns following the former Via Regia from Frankfurt to the east, makes it easily accessible and has contributed to the prosperity of its two constituent villages, Günthersleben and Wechmar.

== History ==
The oldest extant document referring to both villages is the brevarium lulli, an inventory of possessions of the abbey of Hersfeld. In this document, dating from 786, they are referred to as Wehemare and Gonresleibin.

Up to the late Middle Ages, no specifically noteworthy historical events took place.

Sometime between 1590 and 1600, however, Veit Bach settled in Wechmar, who is seen by most as the "founding father" of the Bach musical family. The most prominent person in this lineage is, of course, Johann Sebastian Bach, who was the great-great-grandson of Veit Bach and whose grandfather Christoph Bach grew up in Wechmar before taking a position as city musician in Erfurt. Based on these facts, the Village of Wechmar proudly calls itself "Home of the founding fathers of the Bach musical family" (Urväterheimat der Musikerfamilie Bach). As of 2006, there are once again some descendants of the Bach family living in Wechmar.

During World War II several men and women were brought to the area as forced labour. A family with five children worked on the Swaine family farm in Günthersleben and 70 prisoners of war from Poland on Willy Hesse's estate. Men and women from Ukraine, Poland, and Russia, as well as military prisoners from Italy, were forced to work in the Thüringer Machine factory in Gothaer Straße. A Polish forced labourer was publicly hanged. A stone monument to his memory was erected in 2002..

== Famous Residents ==
The family of the Freiherren von Wechmar can also trace its origins to the village of Wechmar. The former President of the UN General Assembly and former German ambassador to the UN, Rüdiger von Wechmar, who is also an honorary citizen of Wechmar, is currently their most prominent member.

== Tourist attractions ==
Buildings in any way connected to the Bach family are, of course, the primary attractions, including the house of Veit Bach and the mill at which members of the Bach family worked as millers. There are, however, quite a few other places in both Günthersleben and Wechmar worth noticing:

- The Landhaus Studnitz, with its rococo hall, famous for its ornately painted ceiling
- The churches of St Vitus in Wechmar, St. Peter in Günthersleben
- The remains of a moated castle in Günthersleben, a rather beautiful artificial island
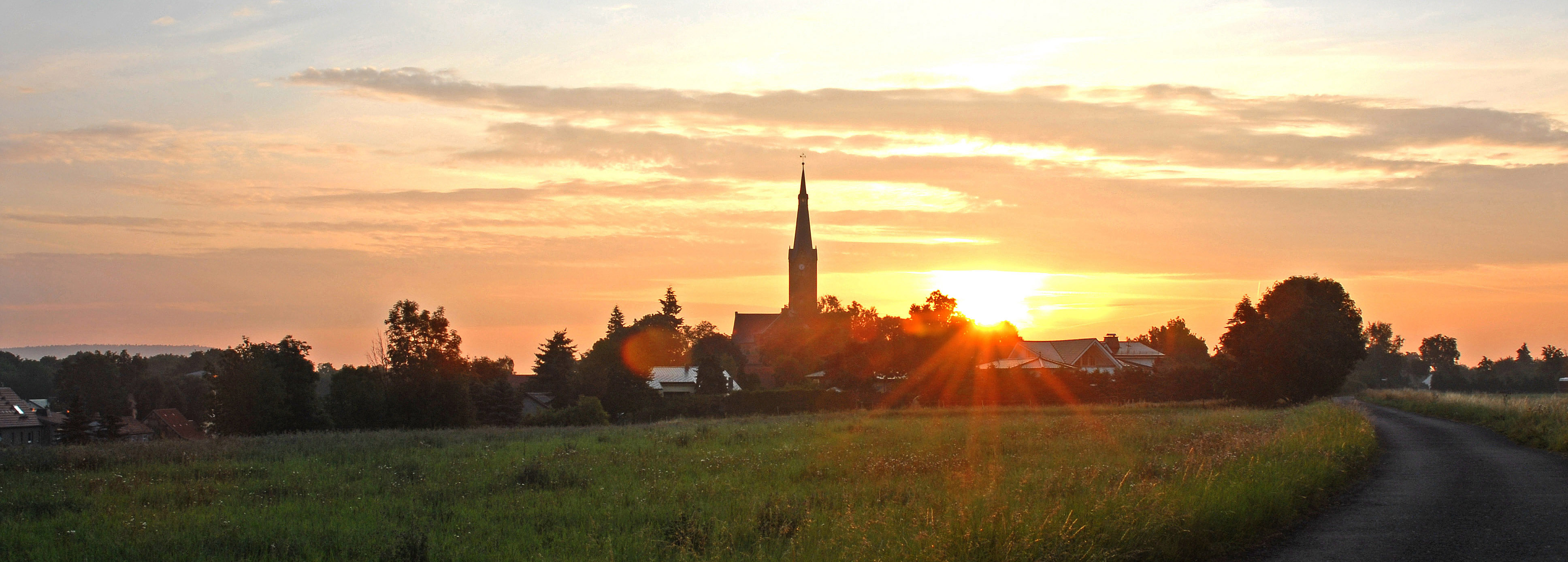
Sunrise in Wechmar

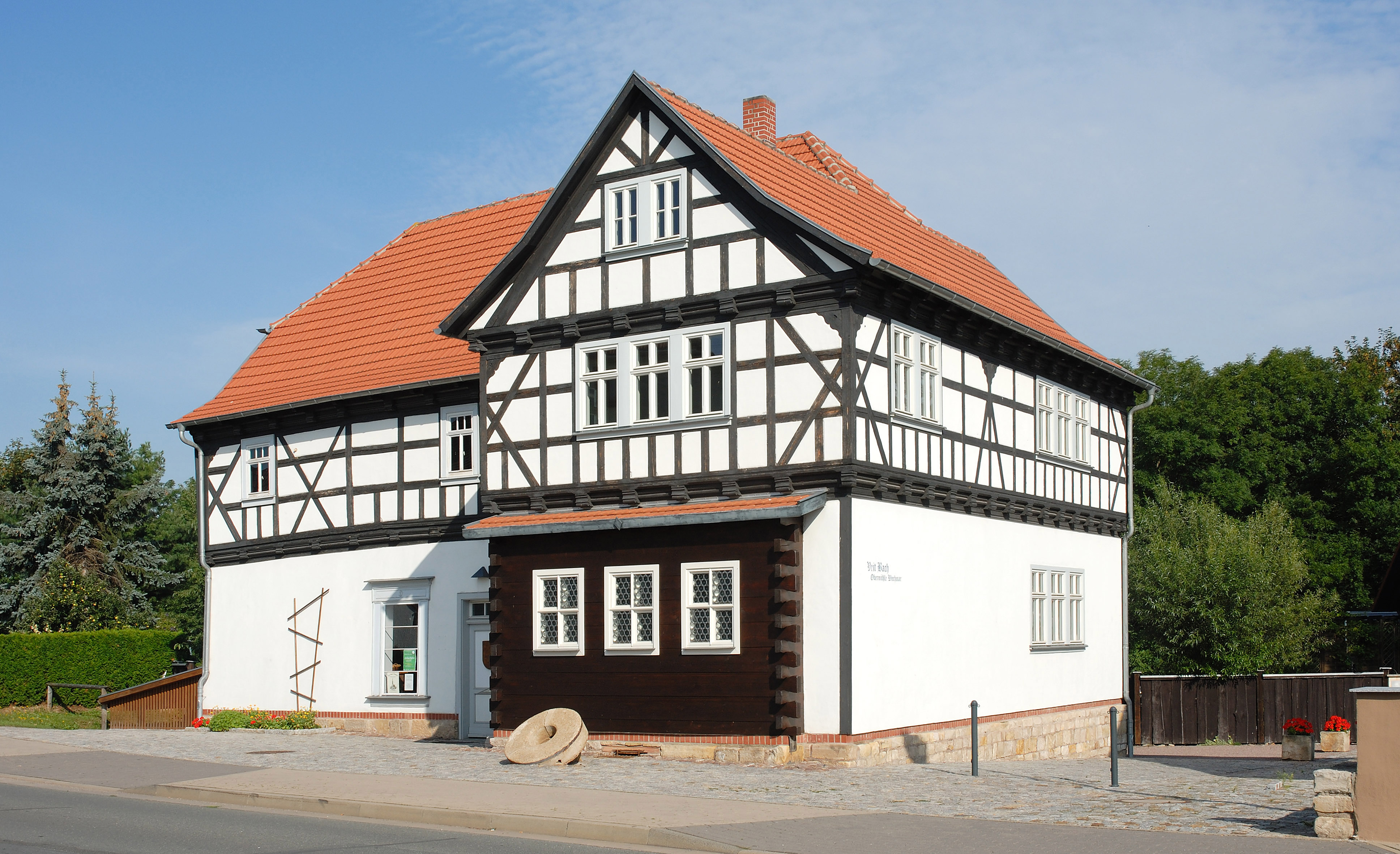
Veit Bach Mill

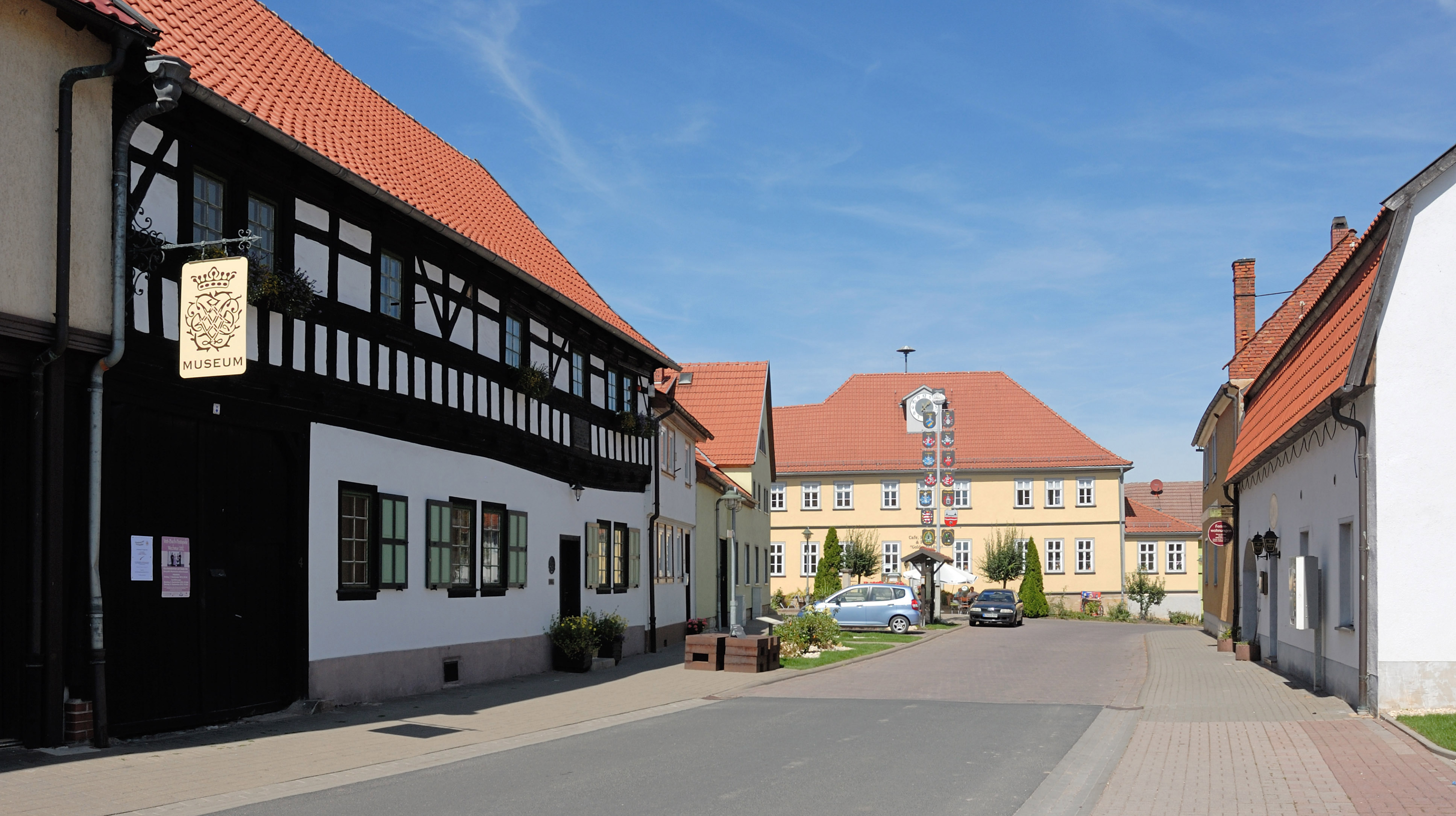
Bach House + Bach Museum

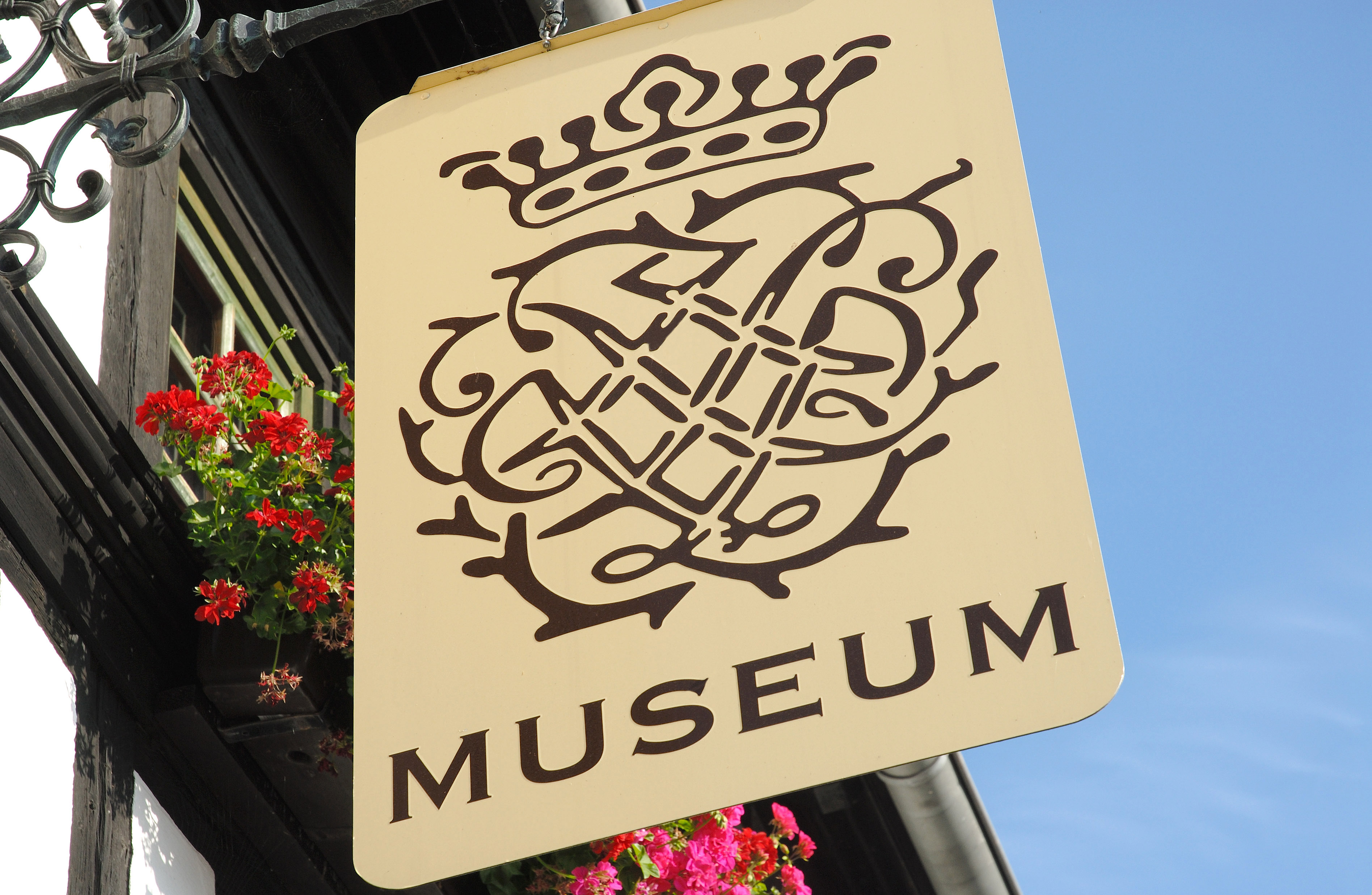
Johann Sebastian Bach Logo at the Bach Museum
