= Johann Sebastian Bach (painter) =

German painter, grandson of the composer (1748–1778)

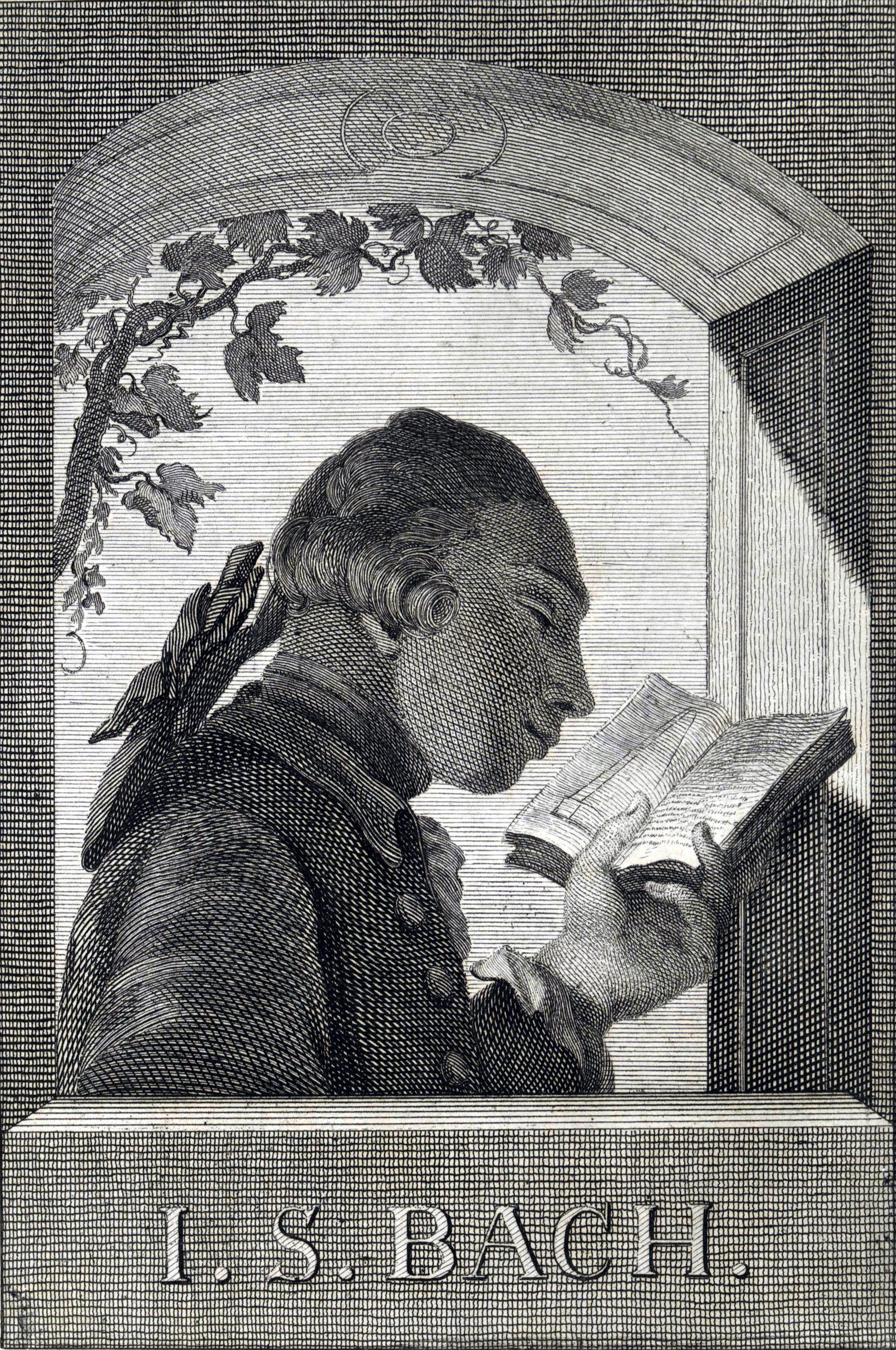
Johann Sebastian Bach the Younger

Johann Sebastian Bach (26 September 1748 – 11 September 1778) was a German painter. He was the son of composer Carl Philipp Emanuel Bach and the grandson of composer Johann Sebastian Bach.

Born in Berlin, Bach studied under Adam Friedrich Oeser in Leipzig. In May 1773, he moved to Dresden, and in February 1776, he relocated to Hamburg, where his father served as Director of Music. In September 1776, he embarked on a study trip to Rome. However, he became seriously ill shortly after his arrival in February 1777 and died in 1778 at the age of 29 from an unknown ailment.

Bach primarily created brush drawings of idyllic landscapes bustling with figures, showing a clear influence from Salomon Gessner. Toward the end of his life, he began focusing on representations of people, producing historical and mythological scenes. He also created vignettes and illustrated works by Gottlieb Rabener and Christian Felix Weiße.

Collections of his works are preserved in Coburg, Dresden, Hamburg, Leipzig, and Vienna.
