= Joachim Werneburg =

German writer (born 1953)

Joachim Werneburg (born July 15, 1953 in Erfurt, East Germany) is a German writer who publishes lyric-epic texts and short prose.

== Life ==
Joachim Werneburg is the son of the artist Walter Werneburg. From 1973 to 1977, he studied theoretical electrical engineering at Technische Universität Ilmenau and was a member at circle of writing students. From 1977 to 1990, he performed a double life as poet and engineer at a microelectronics company in Erfurt. After the Peaceful Revolution in Eastern Germany, he was working at an environment association and, from 1997 to 2019, as government employee.

== Oeuvre ==
Still in GDR-times, a mythology of Thuringia – including geology, plant, and animal beings – was written in the volume "Thüringer Meer" (Thuringian Sea). One aspect of this book is the creative conflict between the Slavic immigration (Wends) and the western conquests (by the Merowingians). A response to the zeitgeist of GDR-times can be found in sharp-tongued epigrams.

By the end of the 1980th, free adaptations from the work of the Chinese poet Pe-lo-thien were written (Bai Juyi, 772–846, Tang dynasty). These are particularly characterized by bewitching images of nature combined with social critics. Werneburg recognized Pe-lo-thien as a kindred spirit and discovered comparable existential experiences (in: "Die Reise nach Südost", Journey to South-East).

The lyric-epic poems of Werneburg written since 1980 belong to a Great Cycle, a world-poem. The Cantos of Ezra Pound served the paragon for such an approach. Of about 100 planned poet cycles, four-fifths are already present. The poem-books published since 2002 illustrate cultural landscapes of the Provence, Cornwall, and portray the mythical conflict between the antique Mediterranean or the ancient Celtic Wales. An Andalusian poem cycle refers to Islamic motifs. Pulsatively, Werneburg returns to Thuringia with his works, such as in a series of ten nature lyric elegies, which are united in the volume "Die Klage der Gorgonen" (The Gorgon's Dirge). Younger text lead to Asia, a dancing dervish, the Yellow Dragon, or the Nō-play.

Werneburg writes a work-journal with a selection provided in the book "Das Kupferbergwerk" (Copper Mine, notes from 1977 to 1989). It reflects the process of writing poems and the life in a totalitarian state. The "Notizen auf der Felswand" (Notes on the Rock’s Face) are from the time after the political turn in Eastern Germany (1990 to 1995) and illustrate the changed situation of the author – now under the conditions of an actual capitalism.

From 1979 to 1994 Walter Werneburg created colored printed graphics for 21 poem cycles. The complete joined work was published in the book "Die Rabenfibel" (The Raven´s Fibula. In „Wort und geschwungene Linie“ (Word and Swinging Line) Joachim Werneburg reports about this cooperation.

== Works ==
Lyrics

- Die Schlangenfüßige Göttin 1993, (Snake Fooded Goddess)
- Das Zeitalter der Eidechse 2002, (The Aeon of the Lizard)
- Die Rabenfibel 2010, (The Raven´s Fibula)
- Thüringer Meer 2012, (Thuringian Sea)
- Die Wiederkehr des Delphins 2013, (The return of the dolphin)
- Die Klage der Gorgonen 2015, (The Gorgon's Dirge)
- Der Untergang Europas 2019, (The sinking of Europe)

Prose

- Wort und geschwungene Linie 2010, (Word and Swinging Line)
- Kupferbergwerk 2011, (Copper Mine)
- Notizen auf der Felswand 2016, (Notes on the Rock’s Face)

Free adaptation

- Die Reise nach Südost 2017, (Journey to South-East).

== Literature (selection) ==
- Agthe, Kai: Zu Gedichten von Joachim Werneburg, 2009 (On poems by Joachim Werneburg)
- Agthe, Kai: Das Hohelied des Mythos, 2008 (The Song of Myths)
- Kirsten, Wulf: In: Deutsches Literatur-Lexikon. Biographisch-bibliographisches Handbuch, 2012 (German Literature Lexicon. Biographical-bibliographical handbook)
- Roewer, Helmut: Bücher von Vater und Sohn, 2014 (Father and son books)
- Geipel, Ines & Walther, Joachim: In: Gesperrte Ablage. Unterdrückte Literaturgeschichte in Ostdeutschland 1945–1989, 2015 (Locked tray. Suppressed literary history in East Germany 1945-1989)
- Dwars, Jens-F.: Umbruch-Notate, 2017 (Break notations)
- Friedrich, Bernd-Ingo: Notizen auf der Felswand, 2018 (Notes on the Rock’s Face)
- Friedrich, Bernd-Ingo: Die Reise nach Südost, 2018 (Journey to South-East)
- Roewer, Helmut & Werneburg, Ingmar (ed.): Das Weltgedicht. Gespräch über das Werk von Joachim Werneburg, 2022 (The World Poem. Discussion about the work of Joachim Werneburg)
