= Johannes Bach =

German composer and musician (1604–1673)

Johann or Johannes Bach (26 November 1604 – buried 13 May 1673) was a German composer and musician of the early Baroque period. He was the father of the so-called "Erfurt line" of Bach family musicians. His surviving works—two motets and an aria—make him the first Bach with extant compositions.

== Life and career ==
Born in Erfurt, Johannes was the eldest son of Johannes Hans Bach and the brother of Christoph Bach and Heinrich Bach. All three were composers. He spent seven years studying under Johann Christoph Hoffmann, a stadtpfeifer in Suhl. From 1634 he served as organist at St. Johannis church in Schweinfurt, and was later organist at Suhl.

In 1635 he became town musician and director of the Raths-Musikanten in Erfurt, and was organist at the town's Predigerkirche from 1636. His first wife, Barbara Hoffman (a daughter of his teacher), died half an hour after bearing a stillborn son in 1639. Following this he married Hedwig Lämmerhirt, the daughter of a town councilman in Erfurt. His children from this marriage included Johannes Christian Bach, Johann Aegidius Bach, and Johann Nicolaus Bach.

Bach's works included two motets, Unser Leben ist ein Schatten and Sei nun wieder zufrieden, and an aria, Weint nicht um meinen Tod.

== See also ==
- Altbachisches Archiv
- Bach family
