= Henry of Friemar the Elder =

Henry of Friemar the Elder (c. 1245 – 18 October 1340), known as Henry the German, was an Augustinian theologian, preacher and mystic.

== Life ==
Henry was born around 1245 in Friemar. He joined the Augustinian hermits and served as the master provincial of Germany from 1296 to 1299. Around 1300, he began to study theology at the University of Paris, where he obtained his master's degree in 1305. He taught there from 1305 until 1312. He was one of the regent masters who advised King Philip IV of France regarding the case against the Templars in 1308 and participated in the condemnation of Marguerite Porete in 1310.

From about 1315, he taught theology at the monastery of Saint Augustine, the studium generale of his order in Erfurt. He died in Erfurt on 18 October 1340.

== Works ==
Henry's Latin writings were very popular. They are preserved in a large number of manuscripts, were early translated into vernacular languages and were printed before 1500. More than 50 of his works have been printed.

His writings that have been edited and printed (at least in part) include:

- Quodlibet, a record of 21 quodlibetal questions from a session at Paris in 1306, preserved complete in one manuscript and partially in two others, edited in 1954 by Clemens Stroick
- Commentaria in libros Ethicorum Aristotelis (1310)
- Tractatus de decem praeceptis (1324, printed 1475), an exposition of the Ten Commandments, later edited by Nicholas of Lyra
- Opus sermonum de Sanctis (printed 1513)
- Tractatus de quattuor instinctibus (printed 1498), a treatise on the four forces influencing humans: God, angels, Satan, human nature. A Low German translation was printed at Lübeck in 1485.
- Expositio passionis Domini (printed 1514)
- Tractatus de origine et progressu ordinis fratrum heremitarum sancti Augustini, the earliest history of the Augustinian order

His writings still in manuscript include:

- Explanatio passionis Dominicae, an exposition of the gospel accounts of the passion of Jesus
- De occultatione vitiorum sub specie virtutum
- De perfectione spirituali interioris hominis
- De vitiis
- De adventu Domini
- De adventu Verbi in mentem, a mystical interpretation of Luke 1:26–29
- De celebratione missae, a mystical interpretation of the Mass

In addition, many of Henry's sermons survive.

== Bibliography ==
- Arbesmann, Rudolphus (2003). "Henry of Friemar". The New Catholic Encyclopedia. Vol. 6 (2nd ed.). The Catholic University of America Press. pp. 750–751.
- Schabel, Christopher; Courtenay, William J. (2007). "Augustinian Quodlibeta After Giles of Rome". In Christopher Schabel (ed.). Theological Quodlibeta in the Middle Ages: The Fourteenth Century. Brill. pp. 545–568.
- Stanonik, Franz (1880). "Heinrich von Friemar". Allgemeine Deutsche Biographie (in German). Vol. 11. Leipzig: Duncker & Humblot. pp. 633–636..
- Zumkeller, Adolar (1969). "Heinrich von Friemar". Neue Deutsche Biographie (in German). Vol. 8. Berlin: Duncker & Humblot. p. 408. (full text online).
