= Johann Ambrosius Bach =

German musician, father to Johann Sebastian Bach (1645–1695)

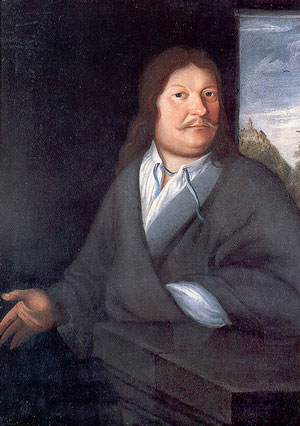

Background information
- Born: 22 February 1645; Erfurt, Electorate of Mainz, Holy Roman Empire
- Died: 20 February 1695 (aged 49)
- Occupation: Musician

Johann Ambrosius Bach (22 February 1645 – 20 February 1695) was a German musician, father to Johann Sebastian Bach.

== Life ==
Johann Ambrosius Bach was born in Erfurt, Germany, the son of musician Christoph Bach (1613–1661). He was the twin brother of Johann Christoph Bach (1645–1693). Ambrosius was employed as a violinist in Erfurt.

In 1671, he moved his family to Eisenach, in present-day Thuringia, where he was employed as a court trumpeter and director of the town musicians. He married his first wife Maria Elisabeth Lämmerhirt on 1 April 1668, and had eight children by her, four of whom became musicians, including Johann Sebastian Bach, the famous German Baroque composer and musician. She was buried on 3 May 1694. On 27 November 1694 he married Barbara Margaretha, née Keul (she had already been twice widowed). He died in Eisenach less than three months later. After Johann Ambrosius Bach's death, his two children, Johann Jacob Bach and Johann Sebastian Bach, moved in with his eldest son, Johann Christoph Bach.

== See also ==
- Bach family
