= Marcel Couraud =

French orchestral and choral conductor and organist

Marcel Just Théodore Marie Couraud (20 October 1912 in Limoges – 14 September 1986 in Loches) was a French orchestral and choral conductor and organist.

== Biography ==
Couraud studied organ with André Marchal in Paris where he attended the Ecole Normale de Musique. He also took courses in composition with Nadia Boulanger and conducting with Charles Munch.

In 1944 he founded the Ensemble Vocal Marcel-Couraud, with whom he performed chansons and madrigals of the Renaissance period (including Orlando di Lasso and Claudio Monteverdi) as well as works by contemporary composers such as Trois Petites Liturgies de la présence divine by Olivier Messiaen. He led the ensemble and also served as the choral director of the Maîtrise de Radio France until 1954 and then conducted the Bach Choir and Bach Orchestra Stuttgart. He also commissioned Epithalame in 1953, a vocal chamber piece by André Jolivet.

From 1967, he was director of the choir of the broadcaster ORTF of Paris, with whom he revived forgotten master works by Schubert and Brahms and baroque composers. From its members, he formed in 1976 the Groupe Vocal de France which he directed until 1978. He directed the premieres o works such as Cinq Rechants by Messiaen (1950), the Dodécaméron by Ivo Malec (1971), Récitatif, air et variations of Gilbert Amy, Nuits by Iannis Xenakis (1968) and the Sonata à douze by Betsy Jolas (1971) and pieces by Barraud, Dao, Ohana and Petrassi.

Following his radio work, Couraud taught at universities in the United States (Los Angeles and Princeton).

His wide-ranging discography covers choral works from the 18th and 20th centuries, orchestral works, operas and operettas.
