= Theological aesthetics =

Interdisciplinary study of theology and aesthetics

Theological aesthetics is the interdisciplinary study of theology and aesthetics, and has been defined as being "concerned with questions about God and issues in theology in the light of and perceived through sense knowledge (sensation, feeling, imagination), through beauty, and the arts". This field of study is broad and includes not only a theology of beauty, but also the dialogue between theology and the arts, such as dance, drama, film, literature, music, poetry, and the visual arts.

Notable theologians and philosophers that have dealt with this subject include Augustine of Hippo, Thomas Aquinas, Martin Luther, Jonathan Edwards, Søren Kierkegaard, Karl Barth, Hans Urs von Balthasar, and David Bentley Hart among others.

Theological aesthetics has recently seen rapid growth as a subject for discussions, publications, and advanced academic studies.

== Aesthetics in Christian theology ==
=== The early church ===
Theological writings during the period of the early Christian church which deal with aesthetics span from circa 160 to c. 650 and include writings by Justin Martyr, Irenaeus, Origen, Augustine of Hippo, Pseudo-Dionysius, Gregory of Nyssa, and Maximus the Confessor, among others. Prevalent themes during this period included "the vision of God or of God's glory, the image of God in Christ and in us, and the concern with idol worship".

=== The medieval church ===
During the Middle Ages, Western theologians such as Anselm of Canterbury, John Scotus Eriugena, Bonaventure, Thomas Aquinas, Nicholas of Cusa, and Bernard of Clairvaux touched upon themes such as "the idea of beauty, the vision of God, the image of Christ, the iconodule-iconoclast conflict, and the strong presence of personally grounded and poetic doxologies".

=== The Reformation ===
Concerning aesthetics, the theologians of the 16th century Protestant Reformation (Martin Luther, Jean Calvin, and Huldrych Zwingli) dealt primarily with "the theology of the image, in particular, idolatry and iconoclasm".

=== The 17th–19th centuries ===
Theological aesthetics increased in diversity during this period, with activity such as "the composition of hymns in Protestant circles, Edwards' writing on beauty, the Romantic artists and intellectuals with their panentheist sensibilities, Schleiermacher's idea of religion as feeling and intuition, the decline of religious art, and the ground-breaking philosophical contributions of thinkers such as Burke, Baumgarten, Kant and Hegel."

=== The 20th century ===
Some major themes which emerged and developed in the 20th century included the question of "how art can function as a source of and in theology" (Tillich, Rahner, Dillenberger), the question of "the art work as a shaper of meaning in today's culture" (Burch Brown, Cox, Küng), "the essential role of imagination in theology" (Lynch, McIntyre, Green), and the beauty of God (van der Leeuw, Barth, von Balthasar). Rookmaaker helpfully sought to provide a reformed Christian critique of art and aesthetics in the cultural and political upheavals of the 1960s in his book 'Modern Art and the Death of a Culture'.

== Present day ==
=== Academic programs ===
==== Graduate studies ====
- Andover Newton Theological School - Newton Centre, MA
  - Master of Arts in Theology and the Arts
- Dallas Theological Seminary - Dallas, TX
  - Master of Arts in Media and Communication
  - Master of Theology with ministry track in Media and Communication
- Dominican School of Philosophy and Theology - Berkeley, CA
  - Master of Arts in Art and Religion
- Duke Divinity School - Durham, North Carolina, USA
  - Master of Divinity - Theology and the Arts course
- Fuller Theological Seminary - Pasadena, California, USA
  - Master of Arts in Theology - Theology and the Arts Format
  - Master of Arts in Worship, Theology, and the Arts
- Graduate Theological Union - Berkeley, CA
  - Master of Arts in Art and Religion
- Huron University College - London, Ontario, Canada
  - Master of Arts in Theology
- King's College London - London, England, United Kingdom
  - Master of Arts in Christianity and the Arts (Theology)
- Regent College - Vancouver, British Columbia, Canada
  - Master of Christian Studies (with an option for an arts thesis)
- Southern Baptist Theological Seminary - Louisville, Kentucky, USA
  - Master of Arts in Theology and Arts
- Union Theological Seminary - New York, NY
  - Master of Arts in Theology and the Arts
- United Theological Seminary of the Twin Cities - New Brighton, MN
  - Master of Arts in Theology and the Arts
- Wesley Theological Seminary - Washington, DC
  - Master of Divinity, Master of Theological Studies, and Master of Arts with Certificate in Theology and the Arts
- Yale Divinity School - New Haven, CT
  - Master of Arts in Religion concentrated in Religion and the Arts
- Yale Institute of Sacred Music - New Haven, CT
  - Master of Arts in Religion concentrated in Religion and the Arts

==== Postgraduate studies ====
- Duke Divinity School - Durham, North Carolina, USA
  - ThD Concentration in the Arts
- Fuller Theological Seminary -Pasadena, California, USA
  - PhD in Theology and Culture
- Graduate Theological Union - Berkeley, CA, USA
  - PhD in Art and Religion
- Southern Baptist Theological Seminary - Louisville, KY, USA
  - PhD in Christianity and the Arts
- University of St. Andrews - The Institute of Theology, Imagination, and the Arts, St. Andrews, Scotland
  - PhD research program
- University of Chicago Divinity School - Chicago, Illinois, USA
  - PhD in Religion and Literature
- Wesley Theological Seminary - Washington, DC, USA
  - DMin in Religion and the Arts

== See also ==
- Christian worship
- Christians in the Visual Arts
- Cultural depictions of Jesus
- Iconography
- Kunstreligion
