= Johann Sebastian Bach =

German composer (1685–1750)

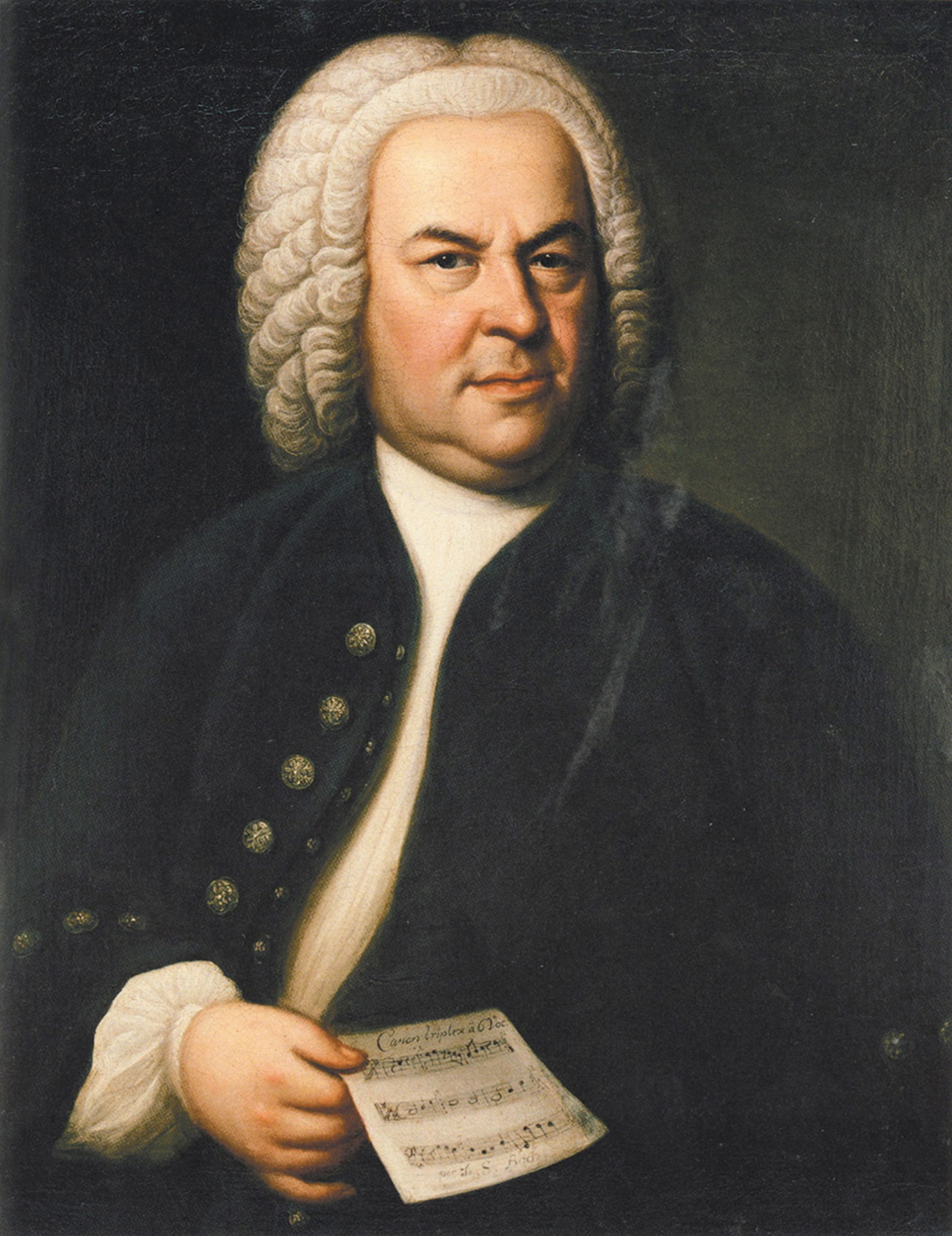
- 1748 portrait of Bach holding a copy of the canon BWV 1076
- Born: 21 March 1685 (O.S.); 31 March 1685 (N.S.); Eisenach
- Died: 28 July 1750 (aged 65); Leipzig
- Occupations: Thomaskantor; composer; violinist; keyboard player; organ expert; school director; conductor
- Works: List of compositions
- Relatives: Bach family

Johann Sebastian Bach (Note: German pronunciation: [ˈjoːhan zeˈbasti̯an ˈbax]. The surname is pronounced /bɑːx/ BAHKH or /bɑːk/ BAHK in English.) (31 March [O.S. 21 March] 1685 – 28 July 1750) was a German composer and musician of the late Baroque period. He is known for his prolific output across a variety of instruments and forms, including the orchestral Brandenburg Concertos; solo instrumental works such as the Cello Suites and Sonatas and Partitas for Solo Violin; keyboard works such as the Goldberg Variations and The Well-Tempered Clavier; organ works such as the Schübler Chorales and the Toccata and Fugue in D minor; and choral works such as the St Matthew Passion and the Mass in B minor. He is known for his mastery of counterpoint, as heard in The Musical Offering and The Art of Fugue. Felix Mendelssohn precipitated the Bach Revival with a performance of the St Matthew Passion in 1829. Ever since, Bach has been acclaimed as one of the greatest composers in the history of Western music.

The Bach family had already produced several composers when Johann Sebastian was born in Eisenach, the youngest child of the city musician Johann Ambrosius Bach. After being orphaned at age 10, he lived for five years with his eldest brother, Johann Christoph, then continued his musical education in Lüneburg. In 1703, he returned to Thuringia, working as a musician for Protestant churches in Arnstadt and Mühlhausen. Around that time he also paid extended visits to the courts in Weimar, where he expanded his organ repertory, and the reformed court at Köthen, where he was mostly engaged with chamber music. By 1723, he was hired as Thomaskantor, church music director of the city of Leipzig and thus responsible for music in four Lutheran city churches and for the St. Thomas School. He decided to compose annual cycles of church cantatas, and also wrote music for Leipzig University's student ensemble, Collegium Musicum. In 1726, he began publishing his organ and other keyboard music. In Leipzig, he had difficult relations with his employer, as he had during some of his earlier positions. This situation was somewhat remedied when his sovereign, Augustus III of Poland, granted him the title of court composer of the Elector of Saxony in 1736. In the last decades of his life, Bach reworked and extended many of his earlier compositions. He died due to complications following eye surgery in 1750 at the age of 65. Four of his twenty children, Wilhelm Friedemann, Carl Philipp Emanuel, Johann Christoph Friedrich, and Johann Christian, became composers.

Bach enriched established German styles through his mastery of counterpoint, harmonic and motivic organisation, and his adaptation of rhythms, forms, and textures from abroad, particularly Italy and France. His compositions include hundreds of cantatas, both sacred and secular. He composed Latin church music, Passions, oratorios, and motets. He adopted Lutheran hymns, not only in his larger vocal works but also in such works as his four-part chorales and his sacred songs. Bach wrote extensively for organ and other keyboard instruments. He composed concertos, for instance for violin and for harpsichord, and suites, as chamber music as well as for orchestra. Many of his works use contrapuntal techniques like canon and fugue. Apart from a few of his keyboard compositions, no more than a few works by Bach were printed during his lifetime.

Several decades after the composer's death, in the 18th century, Bach was still primarily known as an organist. Several biographies of Bach were published in the 19th century, and by the end of that century all of his then known music had been printed. Dissemination of Bach scholarship continued through periodicals (and later websites) devoted to him, other publications such as the Bach-Werke-Verzeichnis (BWV, a numbered catalogue of his works), and new critical editions of his compositions. Many of Bach's cantatas were lost when they were sold for scrap paper value by family members when their finances became tested, and some major works such as the 1731 St Mark Passion (German: Markus-Passion), BWV 247, have apparently also been lost to posterity. Other parts of his repertoire were further popularised by a multitude of arrangements, including the "Air on the G String" and "Jesu, Joy of Man's Desiring", and recordings, among them three boxed sets of performances of his complete surviving œuvre marking the 250th anniversary of his death.

== Life and career ==
=== Youth and education (1685–1703) ===
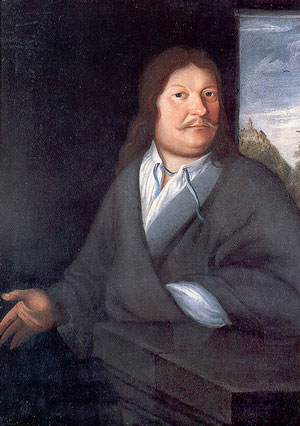
Johann Ambrosius Bach, 1685, Bach's father in a then-fashionable Japanese kimono. Painting attributed to Johann David Herlicius

Johann Sebastian Bach (Note: As was the common custom, Bach's given name 'Sebastian' is from his primary godfather, Sebastian Nagel, a stadtpfeifer (town musician) from Gotha. His first given name, 'Johann', may be from his other godparent Johann Georg Koch, a ducal forester, but it was a popular given name in Germany, and in the Bach Family. To avoid confusion among the many 'Johann' family members, individuals were typically referred to by their last given name, in the composer's case, Sebastian. The word "Bach" means stream in German; by Sebastian's time, the name 'Bach' had essentially become synonymous with 'musician' throughout German-speaking regions.) was born in Eisenach, the capital of the duchy of Saxe-Eisenach, on 21 March 1685 O.S. (31 March N.S.). (Note: Bach's birthdate, 21 March 1685, is according to the Julian calendar (Old Style; O.S.), used in German regions at the time of his birth. From 18 February 1700 onwards, Protestant Germany introduced the modern-day Gregorian calendar, under which Bach's birthdate would be 31 March 1685 (New Style; N.S.). He was baptized at St. George's Church, two days later.) He was the eighth and youngest child of Johann Ambrosius Bach, violinist and director of the town musicians, and Maria Elisabeth née Lämmerhirt, daughter of a city councillor and businessman. (Note: Part of the so-called Erfurt line of the Bach family, Bach's seven siblings (the earlier children of Johann Ambrosius Bach and Maria Elisabeth included): Johann Rudolf Bach (1670–1670; died in childhood); Johann Christoph (1671–1721); Johann Balthasar Bach (1673–1691; died at 18); Johannes Jonas (1675–1685; died in childhood); Marie Salome (1677–1727); Johanna Juditha (1680–1686; died in childhood); Johann Jacob (1682–1722)) The Bach family spanned four generations of musicians throughout Thuringia, forming a prominent musical dynasty. Little is known about Bach's early years before 1693; his musical education in particular is highly conjectural. He probably received early instruction from his father on the violin and basic music theory, and sang with the local schoolboy choir. Many biographers speculate that Bach's uncle, the accomplished organist Johann Christoph Bach (1642–1703), instructed him in organ and perhaps composition, although there is no documentation for this. City regulations required schooling from ages 5 to 12; Bach studied theology, Latin and Greek at the local Latin school. His school attendance was poor, perhaps owing to a string of family deaths: Ambrosius's twin brother Johann Christoph Bach (1645–1693) in September 1693, Bach's mother in May 1694, and his father in February 1695.

Shortly after, the 10-year-old Bach and his brother Johann Jacob moved in with their eldest surviving brother, Johann Christoph Bach (1671–1721), organist at St. Michael's Church in Ohrdruf, Saxe-Gotha-Altenburg. Though small, Ohrdruf offered a number of resources, including a sizeable church music library and an organ in need of repair, which probably exposed Bach to organ building under Georg Christoph Stertzing. Ohrdruf also had a rigorous, Comenius-inspired Lyceum school, now the Gymnasium Gleichense, where Bach excelled in a curriculum that now included music. His obituary names Christoph as Bach's first private music teacher, having "laid the foundations for his playing of the clavier" in the South German organ school tradition of Christoph's own teacher Johann Pachelbel, (Note: Within the work of Philipp Spitta and other commentators, Johann Pachelbel was traditionally credited as a key influence on the young Bach; modern scholars are more cautious. Bach is only known to have met him once, on 23 October 1694 at Christoph's wedding. Regardless, Pachelbel was close with the Bach family: apart from teaching Johann Christoph Bach (1671–1721), he also became godfather to Johann Ambrosius' daughter, Johanna Juditha and at one point lived in Johann Christian Bach's (1640–1682) house.) as well as Johann Caspar Kerll and Johann Jakob Froberger. (Note: These three composers featured in the apocryphal "moonlight manuscript", a story from Bach's obituary in which Christoph forbade Bach access to an important manuscript, so Bach copied the music in secret by moonlight, only for Christoph to confiscate the copy. See Schulenberg (2020, p. 11) or Geck (2006, pp. 40–41) for the original text.) No records show when Bach began to compose, although the musicologist Christoph Wolff points to his Ohrdruf period as a "reasonable" supposition. How much Christoph taught Bach about composition is unknown and Bach's obituarists describe him as a self-taught composer. (Note: Biographer Peter Williams remarks that it remains a "big tantalizing unknown in the Bach biography [as to] how gifted Christoph was and how deep his influence".) Of the liturgical chorale preludes in the Neumeister Collection of organ music, some have been tentatively attributed to Bach c. 1700, and show a general adherence to the style of Pachelbel.

By March 1700, Bach lost his free student accommodation, and later that month travelled north to the much larger city of Lüneburg with his friend Georg Erdmann. Bach had begun studies at St Michael's School by 3 April 1700. In exchange for free schooling, he sang in the choir until his voice broke, received organ lessons and perhaps had access to the school's exceptionally vast musical library. Still, Wolff posits that Bach's "chief interests probably lay outside the school", as the local St. John's Church employed composer and organist Georg Böhm, the most prominent musician Bach had yet encountered. It is unknown whether Bach formally studied with Böhm, but the two were probably acquainted: the c. 1700 Weimar Tablature (discovered in 2005) features copies for study in Bach's hand of works by Böhm and other Northern masters. Perhaps on Böhm's encouragement, Bach made trips north to Hamburg, where he visited his cousin, the organist Johann Ernst; attended Oper am Gänsemarkt performances; and heard the virtuoso Johann Adam Reincken play at St. Catherine's Church, whose organ was among the largest in the world.

In the latter half of 1702, after graduating from St. Michael's earlier in the year, Bach successfully auditioned for the organ post at St. Jacobi, Sangerhausen, but was passed over amid a ducal intervention on behalf of Johann Augustin Kobelius. He is next recorded in early 1703 at a minor court of Weimar, as court musician under Johann Ernst III, Duke of Saxe-Weimar. His role there is unclear, but it probably included menial, common labour duties alongside musical ones: many scholars suspect the latter tasks involved acting as a substitute organist for Johann Effler (1634–1711), who was in poor health. (Note: His connections to Sangerhausen and Weimar may stem from Effler, an old family friend; alternatively, musicologist Charles Sanford Terry suggested the appointment was a consolation offering from Johann Georg, Duke of Saxe-Weissenfels, who had secured the Sangerhausen position for Kobelius over Bach.)

=== Arnstadt and Mühlhausen (1703–1708) ===
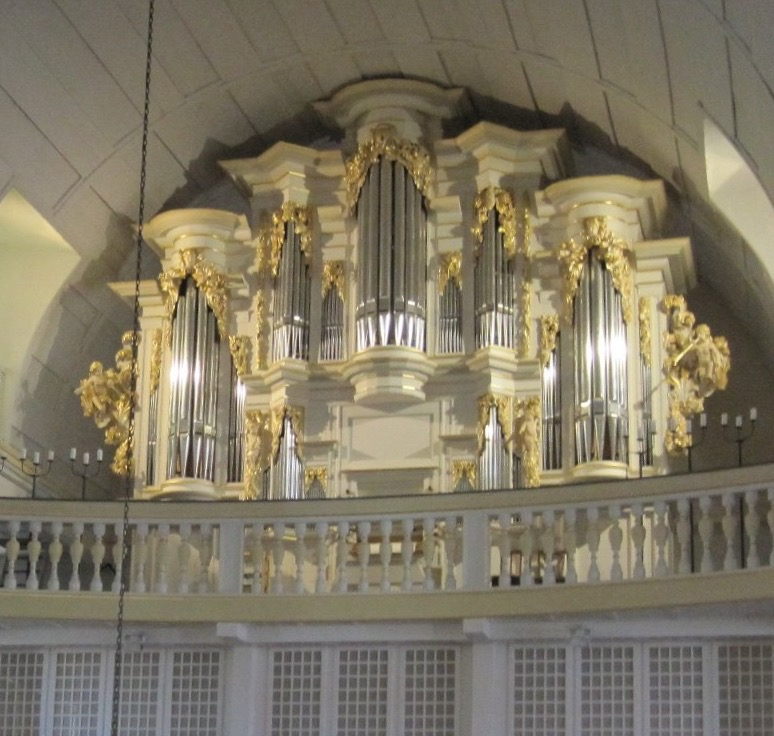
Current version of the Wender organ in the Bach Church, Arnstadt.

During Bach's seven-month tenure at Weimar, his reputation as a keyboardist spread so widely that he was invited to inspect the new organ and give the inaugural recital at the New Church (now Bach Church) in Arnstadt, about 30 kilometres (19 mi) southwest of Weimar. On 14 August 1703 he became the organist at the New Church, with light duties, a generous salary, and a new organ tuned in a temperament that allowed music written in a wider range of keys to be played.

Although Johann Ernst III was musically enthusiastic, the relationship grew tense. In 1705–1706, Bach upset the duke when, after obtaining a four-week leave of absence, he was away for about four months, taking lessons from the organist and composer Johann Adam Reincken and wanting to hear Reincken and Dieterich Buxtehude play in Lübeck. The visit to Buxtehude and Reincken involved a 450-kilometre (280 mi) journey each way, reportedly on foot. Buxtehude probably introduced Bach to his friend Reincken so that he could learn from his compositional technique (especially his mastery of fugue), his organ playing, and his improvisational skill. Bach knew Reincken's music very well; he copied Reincken's monumental An Wasserflüssen Babylon when he was 15 years old. When Bach revisited Reincken in 1720 and showed him his improvisational skill on the organ, Reincken reportedly remarked: "I thought that this art was dead, but I see that it lives in you."

In 1706 Bach applied for a post as organist at the Blasius Church in Mühlhausen. As part of his application, he had a cantata performed at Easter, 24 April 1707, that resembles his later Christ lag in Todes Banden, BWV 4. Bach's application was accepted a month later, and he took up the post in July. The position included higher remuneration, improved conditions, and a better choir. Bach persuaded the church and town government at Mühlhausen to fund an expensive renovation of the organ at the Blasius Church. In 1708 Bach wrote Gott ist mein König, BWV 71, a festive cantata for the inauguration of the new council, which was published at the council's expense. This is the only extant Bach cantata published in his lifetime.

Four months after arriving at Mühlhausen in 1707, Bach married his second cousin, Maria Barbara Bach. Later that year their first child, Catharina Dorothea, was born, and Maria Barbara's elder, unmarried sister joined them, remaining to help run the household until she died in 1729. Three sons were also born: Wilhelm Friedemann, Carl Philipp Emanuel, and Johann Gottfried Bernhard. All became musicians, and the first two, composers. Johann Sebastian and Maria Barbara had seven children. Their twins born in 1713 died within a year, and their last son, Leopold, also died within a year of his birth. On 7 July 1720, while Bach was in Carlsbad with Prince Leopold, Maria Barbara died suddenly. The next year, he met Anna Magdalena Wilcke, a gifted soprano 16 years his junior, while she was performing at the court in Köthen; they married on 3 December 1721. Together they had 13 children, six of whom survived into adulthood: Gottfried Heinrich; Elisabeth Juliane Friederica (1726–1781); Johann Christoph Friedrich and Johann Christian, who both became musicians; Johanna Carolina (1737–1781); and Regina Susanna (1742–1809).

=== Return to Weimar (1708–1717) ===
Bach left Mühlhausen and returned to Weimar as court organist in 1708, after Johann Ernst's death. He worked with one of Ernst's sons, also named Johann Ernst, who had a keen interest in music. The prince's interest in collecting music was sufficiently well known that in 1713, when one of Bach's pupils, P. D. Kräuter, requested a leave of absence to study in Weimar, he mentioned the French and Italian music the prince was expected to introduce there. The prince also composed, and Bach wrote the Organ Concerto No.1 in G Major, BWV 592, and Concerto for Organ solo in C major, BWV 595, after a theme by the prince.

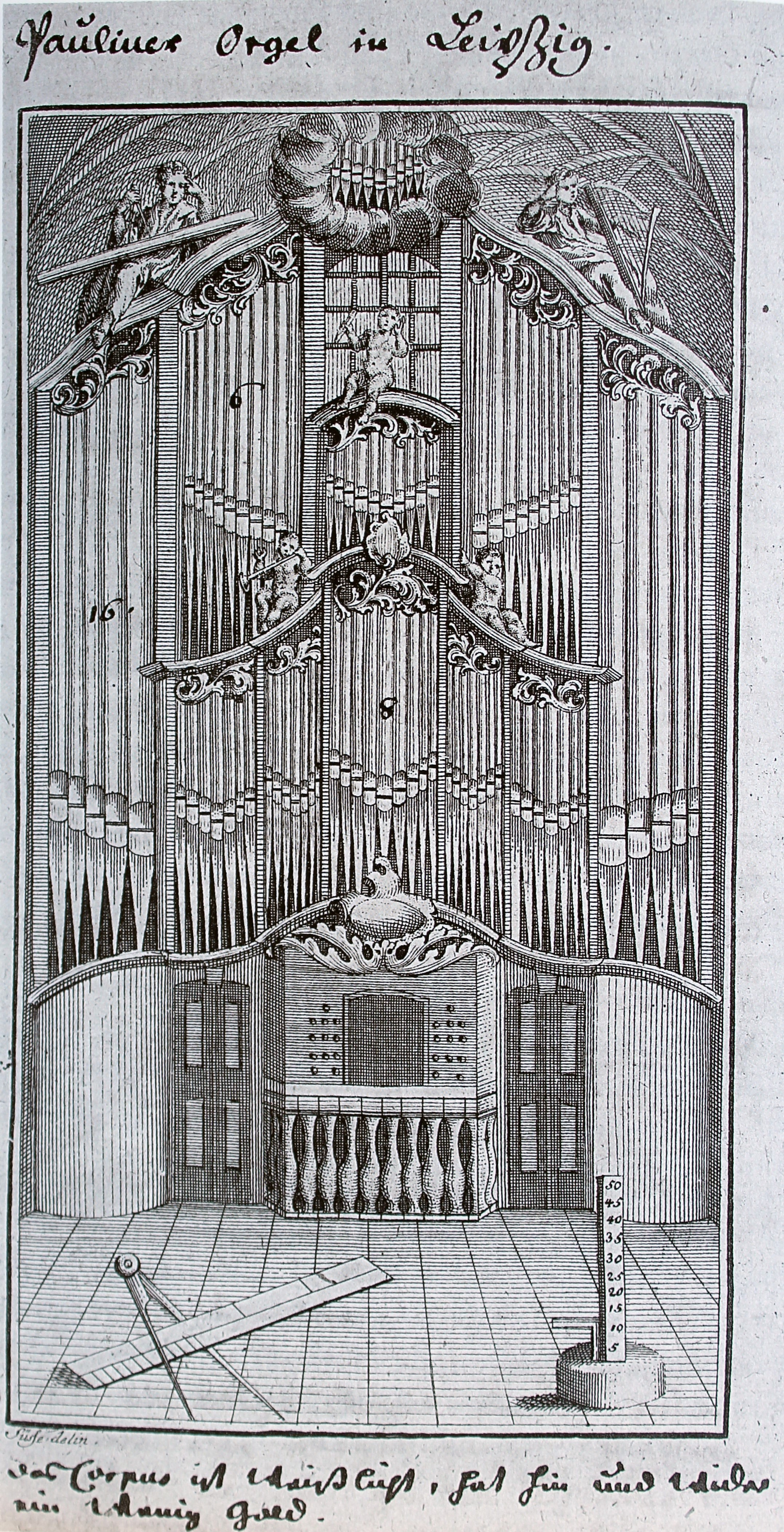
Organ of the St Paul's Church in Leipzig, tested by Bach in 1717

In 1714, Bach became Konzertmeister (director of music) at the ducal court, where he could work with a large, well-funded contingent of professional musicians. Bach and his wife moved into a house near the ducal palace. Bach's time in Weimar began a sustained period of composing keyboard and orchestral works. He attained the proficiency and confidence to extend the prevailing structures and include influences from abroad. He learned to write dramatic openings and employ the dynamic rhythms and harmonic schemes used by Italians such as Vivaldi, Corelli, and Torelli. Bach absorbed these stylistic aspects to a certain extent by transcribing Vivaldi's string and wind concertos for harpsichord and organ. He was particularly attracted to the Italian style, in which one or more solo instruments alternate section-by-section with the full orchestra throughout a movement.

In Weimar Bach continued to play and compose for the organ and perform concert music with the duke's ensemble. He also began to write the preludes and fugues that were later assembled into the first volume of The Well-Tempered Clavier ("clavier" meaning clavichord or harpsichord), which eventually comprised two volumes written over 20 years, each containing 24 pairings of preludes and fugues in every major and minor key. In Weimar, Bach also started work on the Little Organ Book, containing traditional Lutheran chorale tunes set in complex textures. In 1713 Bach was offered, but declined, a post in Halle when he advised the authorities during a renovation by Christoph Cuntzius of the main organ in the west gallery of the Market Church of Our Dear Lady.

In early 1714 Bach was promoted to Konzertmeister, an honour that entailed performing a church cantata monthly in the castle church. The first three cantatas in the new series Bach composed in Weimar were Himmelskönig, sei willkommen, BWV 182, for Palm Sunday, which coincided with the Annunciation that year; Weinen, Klagen, Sorgen, Zagen, BWV 12, for Jubilate Sunday; and Erschallet, ihr Lieder, erklinget, ihr Saiten!, BWV 172, for Pentecost. Bach's first Christmas cantata, Christen, ätzet diesen Tag, BWV 63, premiered in 1714 or 1715. In 1717 Bach fell out of favour in Weimar and, according to the court secretary's report, was jailed for almost a month before being dismissed from his position: "On November 6, [1717,] the quondam concertmaster and organist Bach was confined to the County Judge's place of detention for too stubbornly forcing the issue of his dismissal and finally on December 2 was freed from arrest with notice of his unfavourable discharge."

=== Köthen (1717–1723) ===
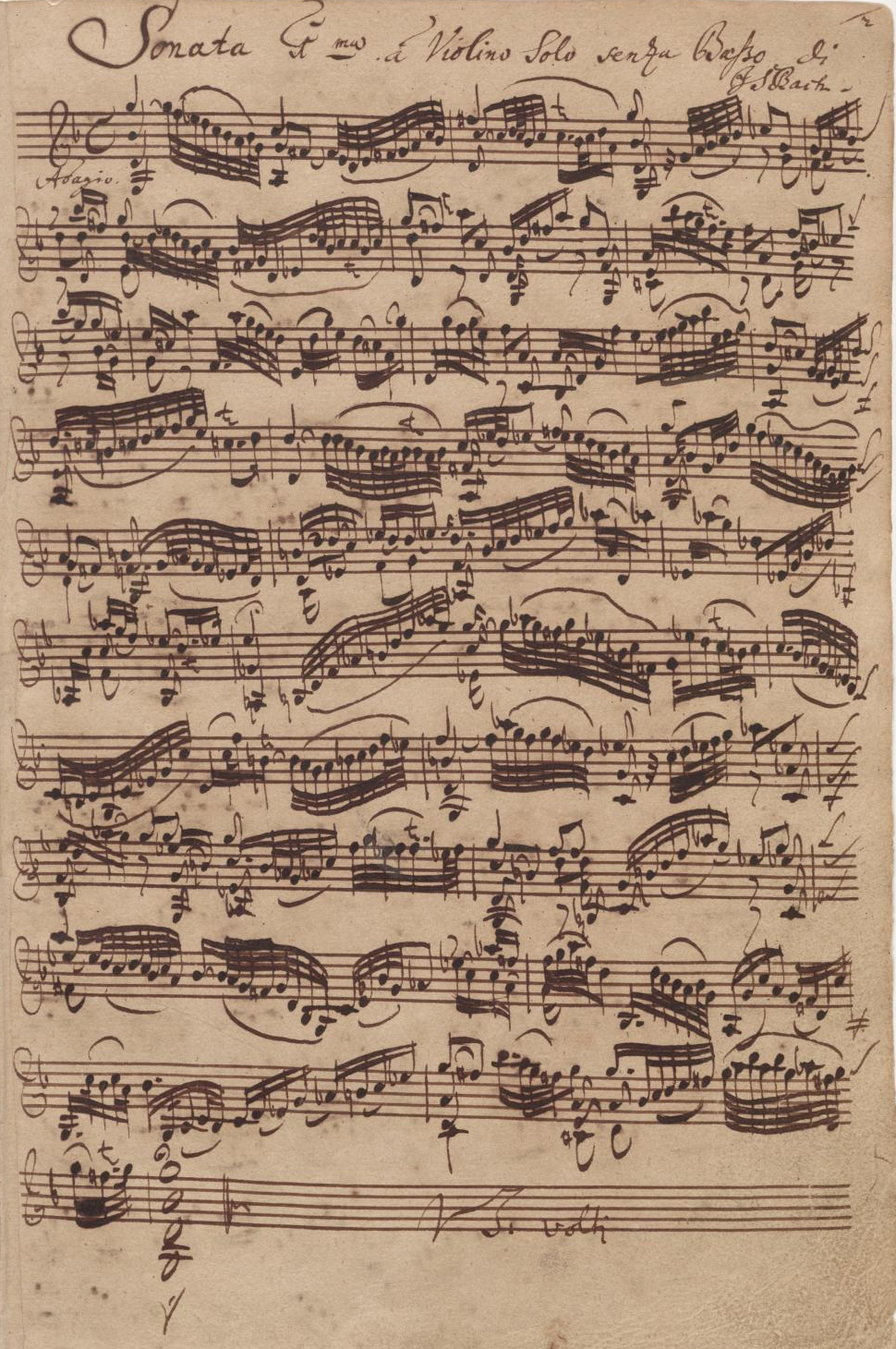
Bach's autograph of the first movement of the first sonata for solo violin, BWV 1001

Leopold, Prince of Anhalt-Köthen, hired Bach to serve as his Kapellmeister (director of music) in 1717. Himself a musician, Leopold appreciated Bach's talents, paid him well, and gave him considerable latitude in composing and performing. Leopold was a Calvinist and thus did not use elaborate music in his form of worship, so most of Bach's work from this period is secular, including the orchestral suites, Cello Suites, Sonatas and Partitas for Solo Violin, and the Brandenburg Concertos. Bach also composed secular cantatas for the court, such as Die Zeit, die Tag und Jahre macht, BWV 134a.

In 1719, Bach made the 35-kilometre (22 mi) journey from Köthen to Halle with the intention to meet Handel, but Handel had left town. In 1730, Bach's oldest son, Wilhelm Friedemann, travelled to Halle to invite Handel to visit the Bach family in Leipzig, but the visit did not take place.

=== Leipzig (1723–1750) ===
==== Appointment ====
In 1723 Bach was appointed Thomaskantor (director of church music) in Leipzig, a mercantile Saxon city with "the leading cantorate in Protestant Germany". He was responsible for directing the St. Thomas School and for providing four churches with music, the St. Thomas Church, the St. Nicholas Church, and to a lesser extent the New Church and St. Peter's Church. A cantata was required for the church services on each Sunday and additional church holidays during the liturgical year.

Johann Kuhnau had been Thomaskantor in Leipzig from 1701 until his death on 5 June 1722. Bach had visited Leipzig during Kuhnau's tenure: in 1714 he attended the service at the St. Thomas Church on the first Sunday of Advent, and in 1717 he tested the organ at St. Paul's Church. In 1716 Bach and Kuhnau met on the occasion of the testing and inauguration of an organ in Halle. Bach was offered the position only after it had been offered to Georg Philipp Telemann and then Christoph Graupner—both of whom chose to stay where they were, Telemann in Hamburg and Graupner in Darmstadt—after using the Leipzig offer to negotiate better terms of employment.

Bach was required to instruct the Thomasschule students in singing. He was also assigned to teach Latin but was allowed to employ four "prefects" (deputies) to do that for him. The prefects also aided with musical instruction. Bach held the position for 27 years, until his death. During that time, he gained further prestige through honorary appointments at the courts of Köthen and Weissenfels, as well as that of the Elector Frederick Augustus (who was also King of Poland) in Dresden. Bach frequently disagreed with his employer, Leipzig's city council, whom he regarded as "penny-pinching".

==== Cantata cycle years (1723–1729) ====
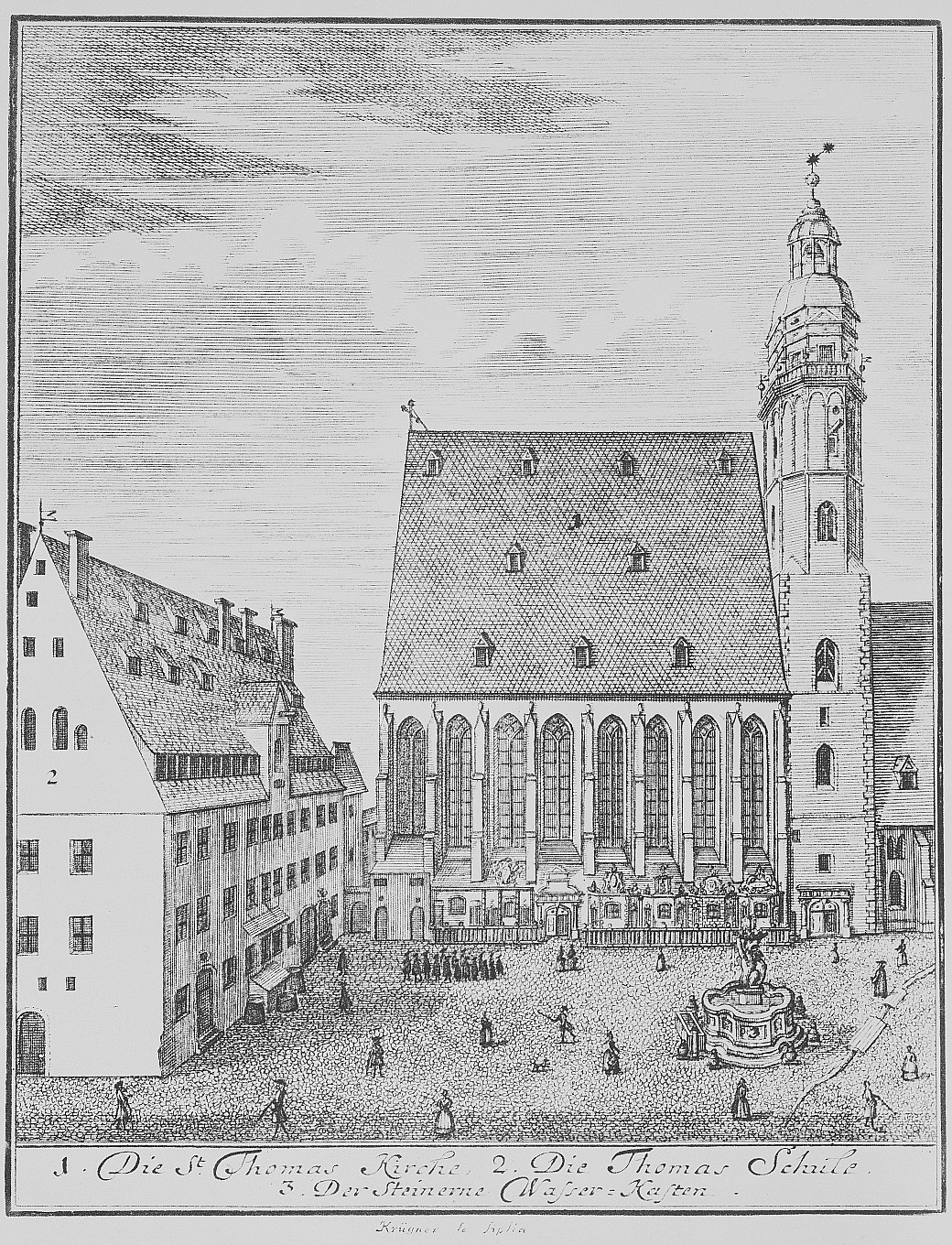
St Thomas Church and School, Leipzig in 1723

In 1723, and until 1729, Bach was appointed as Thomaskantor and director musices in Leipzig, which made him responsible for the music at four churches. He provided church music for the two main churches, St. Thomas and St. Nicholas, and occasionally also for two others, the New Church and St. Peter. Bach took office in the middle of the liturgical year, on the first Sunday after Trinity. In Leipzig, cantata music was expected on Sundays and on feast days, except during the tempus clausum ("silent periods") of Advent and Lent. In 1725, the feast fell on Palm Sunday. Annunciation was the only occasion for festive music during Lent. The prescribed readings were Isaiah's prophecy of the birth of the Messiah (Isaiah 7:10–16), and from the Gospel of Luke, the angel Gabriel announcing the birth of Jesus (Luke 1:26–38).

In his first twelve months in office, Bach decided to compose new works for almost all liturgical occasions. These works became known as his first cantata cycle. In his second year in office, Bach composed a cycle of chorale cantatas, with each cantata based on one Lutheran hymn, for the liturgical occasions. The choice of hymn for each of the cantatas was probably made according to the wishes of a local minister, who based the choices upon the prescribed readings and his plans for sermons. Compared to the first cycle, the music has less emphasis on biblical texts, but more on the use of chorale text and melody. Bach's earliest extant chorale cantata, Christ lag in Todes Banden, BWV 4, written more than a decade before arriving in Leipzig, followed the per omnes versus principle, that is, it adopted the text of all stanzas of the hymn without modification, the hymn's melody being used throughout. Most of the chorale cantatas Bach wrote in his second year in Leipzig, including Wie schön leuchtet der Morgenstern, were formatted differently. In this structure, the outer stanzas of the hymn, and its melody, were retained in the outer movements of the cantata: typically the first stanza was set as an opening chorale fantasia, and the last as a closing four-part chorale. The inner stanzas of the hymn were rephrased into recitatives and arias for the cantata's inner movements, their setting mostly not based on the hymn tune.

==== Middle years in Leipzig (1730–1739) ====
Before starting on the Gospel of Mark after 1730, Bach had composed the St John Passion and the St Matthew Passion; the latter was first performed on Good Friday 11 April 1727. The 1731 St Mark Passion (German: Markus-Passion), BWV 247, is a lost Passion setting by Bach, first performed in Leipzig on Good Friday, 23 March 1731. Though Bach's music is lost, the libretto by Picander is extant, and the work can to some degree be reconstructed from it. In 1733 Bach composed a Kyrie–Gloria Mass in B minor for the court in Dresden, which had become Catholic, that he later used in his Mass in B minor. He presented the manuscript to the Elector in a successful bid to persuade the prince to give him the title of Court Composer. He later extended this work into a full mass by adding a Credo, Sanctus, and Agnus Dei, the music for which was partly based on his own cantatas and partly original. Bach's appointment as Court Composer was part of his long struggle to achieve greater bargaining power with the Leipzig council.

Bach's seal (centre), used throughout his Leipzig years. It contains the superimposed letters J S B in a mirror image topped with a crown. The flanking letters illustrate the arrangement on the seal.

Bach composed his Christmas Oratorio for the 1734–35 Christmas season in Leipzig, by using works he had already composed such as the Christmas cantatas and other church music for all seven occasions of the Christmas season including part of his Weimar cantata cycle and Christen, ätzet diesen Tag, BWV 63. In 1735 Bach started preparing his first organ music publication, which was printed as the third Clavier-Übung in 1739. From around that year he started to compile and compose the set of preludes and fugues for harpsichord that became the second book of The Well-Tempered Clavier. He received the title of "Royal Court Composer" from Augustus III of Poland in 1736. Between 1737 and 1739 Bach's former pupil Carl Gotthelf Gerlach held the directorship of the Collegium Musicum.

==== Final years (1740–1750) ====
From 1740 to 1748 Bach copied, transcribed, expanded or programmed music in an older polyphonic style (stile antico) by, among others, Palestrina (BNB I/P/2), Kerll (BWV 241), Torri (BWV Anh. 30), Bassani (BWV 1081), Gasparini (Missa Canonica), and Caldara (BWV 1082). Bach's style shifted in the last decade of his life, showing an increased integration of elements of the stile antico, including polyphonic structures and canons. His fourth and last Clavier-Übung volume, the Goldberg Variations for two-manual harpsichord, contains nine canons and was published in 1741. During this period, Bach also continued to adapt music of contemporaries such as Handel (BNB I/K/2) and Stölzel (BWV 200), and gave many of his own earlier compositions, such as the St Matthew and St John Passions and the Great Eighteen Chorale Preludes, their final revisions. He also programmed and adapted music by composers of a younger generation, including Pergolesi (BWV 1083), and his own students, such as Goldberg (BNB I/G/2).

In 1746 Bach was preparing to enter Lorenz Christoph Mizler's Society of Musical Sciences. To be admitted, he had to submit a composition. He chose his Canonic Variations on "Vom Himmel hoch da komm' ich her", and a portrait painted by Elias Gottlob Haussmann that featured Bach's Canon triplex á 6 Voc. In May 1747, Bach visited the court of King Frederick the Great in Potsdam. The king played a theme for Bach and challenged him to improvise a fugue based on it. Bach obliged, playing a three-part fugue on one of Frederick's early prototypes of a new instrument, the fortepiano. Frederick then set him the challenge of improvising a six-part fugue on the theme. Bach's response was to accept the challenge given more time, providing instead a virtuosic six-voice fugue improvised on a theme of his own choosing. On his return to Leipzig he composed a set of fugues (six-part fugue included) and canons and a trio sonata based on the Thema Regium ("King's Theme"). Within a few weeks this music was published and sent to Frederick, to whom it was dedicated, as the Musical Offering. The Schübler Chorales, a set of six chorale preludes transcribed from cantata movements Bach had written two decades earlier, were published within a year. Around the same time, the set of five canonic variations Bach had submitted when entering Mizler's society in 1747 were also printed.

Two large-scale compositions occupied a central place in Bach's last years. Beginning around 1742 he wrote and revised the various canons and fugues of The Art of Fugue, which he continued to prepare for publication until shortly before his death. After extracting a cantata, BWV 191, from his 1733 Kyrie-Gloria Mass for the Dresden court in the mid-1740s, Bach expanded that setting into his Mass in B minor in the last years of his life. The complete mass was not performed during his lifetime. It is considered among the greatest choral works in history. Although Bach was in declining health in January 1749, he was able to celebrate his daughter Elisabeth Juliane Friederica's marriage to his pupil Johann Christoph Altnickol. On 2 June Heinrich von Brühl wrote to one of the Leipzig burgomasters to request that his music director, Gottlob Harrer, fill the Thomaskantor and Director musices posts "upon the eventual ... decease of Mr. Bach". His eyesight failing, Bach underwent eye surgery in March 1750 and again in April by the British eye surgeon John Taylor, a man widely understood today to be a charlatan who is believed to have blinded hundreds of people, including George Frideric Handel.

=== Death and burial ===
Bach died on 28 July 1750 from complications due to incompetently performed eye surgery. He had a stroke a few days before his death. He was buried at Old St John's Cemetery in Leipzig, where his grave went unmarked for nearly 150 years. In 1894, his remains were found and moved to a vault in St John's Church. This building was destroyed by Allied bombing during the Second World War, and in 1950 Bach's remains were taken to their present grave in St Thomas Church. Later research has called into question whether the remains in the grave are actually Bach's.

An inventory drawn up a few months after Bach's death shows that his estate included five harpsichords, two lute-harpsichords, three violins, three violas, two cellos, a viola da gamba, a lute, a spinet, and 52 "sacred books", including works by Martin Luther and Josephus. C. P. E. Bach saw to it that The Art of Fugue, though unfinished, was published in 1751. Together with one of J. S. Bach's former students, Johann Friedrich Agricola, C. P. E. Bach also wrote the obituary ("Nekrolog"), which was published in Mizler's Musikalische Bibliothek, a periodical journal produced by the Society of Musical Sciences, in 1754.

== Music ==
Bach's music encompasses every genre of his time apart from opera. (Note: According to the musicologist Markus Rathey, "The primary reason for this is rather simple: he never was in the position to write [an opera]. He either held church positions where he did not have to compose secular stage works (as in Mühlhausen or Leipzig), or he worked at courts where regular opera performances were not common, as in Köthen and Weimar." Still, Rathey remarks that Bach was well acquainted with contemporary German opera trends; he was friends with the leading German opera composer Johann Adolph Hasse and probably attended the premiere of Hasse's Cleofide in Dresden. On the Bach-Hasse connection, see Geck 2006, p. 419) His body of work includes more than 200 sacred and secular cantatas; dozens of other (often large-scale) vocal works, including oratorios, passions, motets, and various Latin church music; a large body of both organ and keyboard music; and several collections of orchestral and chamber music, which are often hard to distinguish. (Note: For issues of classifying certain Bach composition as orchestral or chamber Breig 1997, pp. 123–126, Vogt 1988, pp. 13–15 and Breig 2016, § "Kammermusik".) Musicologists often loosely link specific genres to different career stages: organ music during his positions as organist in Weimar, Arnstadt, and Mühlhausen; chamber and orchestral works during his tenure as Kapellmeister in Köthen; and choral music during his years as cantor in Leipzig. (Note: Although this classification scheme has been commonplace since Philipp Spitta's seminal Bach biography was published, Wolff cautions against rigid categorizations of this kind, as they have contributed to dubious datings, especially among the vocal and instrumental works.) Although these emphases reflected professional duties, Bach's artistic ambitions typically far exceeded the practical requirements of his positions. Wolff observes that Bach's career trajectory shows a deliberate progression from organist to Konzertmeister, reflecting his evolving musical interests.

Although Bach never left modern-day Germany (apart from two brief trips to neighbouring Bohemia), he had extensive awareness of contemporary European music and developed his musical voice from a synthesized conglomerate of styles. Among his most important early influences were three Germans he knew personally, Dieterich Buxtehude, Georg Böhm, and Johann Reincken. (Note: According to C. P. E. Bach, his early studies also included the music of Northern German Friedrich Nicolaus Bruhns, and South Germans such as Johann Caspar Kerll, Johann Jakob Froberger, and particularly Johann Pachelbel (under whom Johann Christoph studied). He also knew the music of Johann Kuhnau and Johann Caspar Ferdinand Fischer.) C. P. E. Bach also gives as later influences the Germans Reinhard Keiser, Johann Adolph Hasse, Carl Heinrich Graun, Johann Gottlieb Graun, and Georg Philipp Telemann; the Bohemians active in Germany Jan Dismas Zelenka, and Franz Benda; and the British-German George Frideric Handel. Throughout his life, Bach was deeply interested in Italian and French music, seeking to unite the two traditions—particularly the Italian sonata and the French suite—into a "mixed style" (vermischte Geschmack). He often incorporated the clarity of Italian melodic structure and the dance forms of the French. Representative influences included the Frenchmen Nicolas de Grigny, Jean-Baptiste Lully, Marin Marais, and André Raison; the Italians Luigi Battiferri and Girolamo Frescobaldi; the proponents of the so-called stile antico, Tomaso Albinoni, Antonio Caldara, and Antonio Lotti; and the latter group's Renaissance forebear Giovanni Pierluigi da Palestrina. From c. 1712 onwards, Antonio Vivaldi's music was Bach's most important influence, having—according to Forkel—"taught him to think musically".

Only a small number of Bach's compositions were printed during his lifetime, mostly for keyboard or organ. His music for keyboard—and, to a somewhat lesser extent, for organ—also occupied him most consistently throughout his life. In addition, Bach's experience as a violinist, violist, and (at least early on) singer contributed to a versatile output that is frequently technically demanding and often virtuosic, although Wolff writes that "technical virtuosity never predominates; it becomes a functional element within the composition as a whole." Another essential component of Bach's style is his compositional craftsmanship, which spans a fluency of highly complex counterpoint and harmony in both homophonic and polyphonic textures. To this end, Bach's music incorporates frequent modulations, often achieved through harmonic sequences; intricate four-part harmony, including the more than 400 chorales throughout his output; and contrapuntal structures such as the canon and particularly fugue, which feature in many of his compositions.

=== Creative range ===
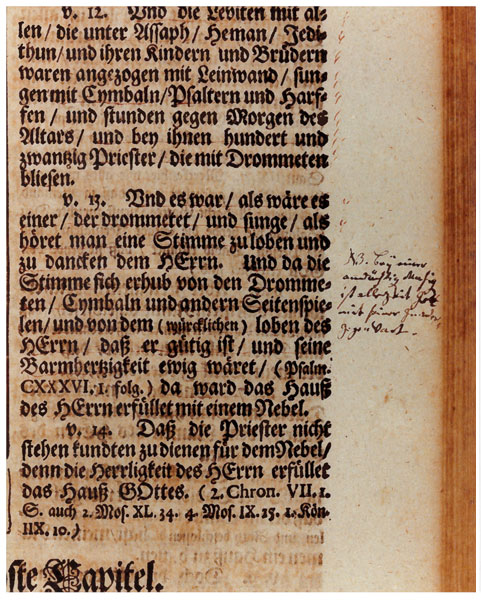
A handwritten note by Bach in his copy of the Calov Bible. The note next to 2 Chronicles 5:13 reads: NB Bey einer andächtigen Musiq ist allezeit Gott mit seiner Gnaden Gegenwart; Eng. trans. "N(ota) B(ene) In a music of worship God is always present with his grace".

Bach's creative range and musical style encompassed four-part harmony, modulation, ornamentation, use of solo continuo instruments, virtuoso instrumentation, counterpoint, and a refined attention to structure and lyrics. Like his contemporaries Handel, Telemann, and Vivaldi, Bach composed concertos, suites, recitatives, da capo arias, and four-part choral music, and employed basso continuo. Most of the prints of Bach's music that appeared during his lifetime were commissioned by the composer. His music is harmonically more innovative than his peers', employing surprisingly dissonant chords and progressions, often extensively exploring harmonic possibilities within one piece.

Bach's hundreds of sacred works are usually seen as manifesting not just his craft but also a deep faith in the biblical God. His commitment to the Lutheran faith was reflected in his teaching Luther's Small Catechism as the Thomaskantor in Leipzig, and some of his pieces represent it. The contents of Luther's Small Catechism contain such religious themes as the Ten Commandments, the Apostles' Creed, the Lord's Prayer, the Sacrament of Holy Baptism, the Office of the Keys and Confession, and the Sacrament of the Eucharist. The Lutheran chorale was the basis of much of his work. In elaborating these hymns into his chorale preludes, he wrote more cogent and tightly integrated works than most, even when they were massive and lengthy. The large-scale structure of every major Bach sacred vocal work is evidence of subtle, elaborate planning to create religiously and musically powerful expression. Bach published or carefully compiled in manuscript many collections of pieces that explored the range of artistic and technical possibilities inherent in almost every genre of his time except opera. For example, The Well-Tempered Clavier comprises two books, each of which presents a prelude and fugue in every major and minor key.

=== Compositional style in the High Baroque ===
==== Four-part harmony ====
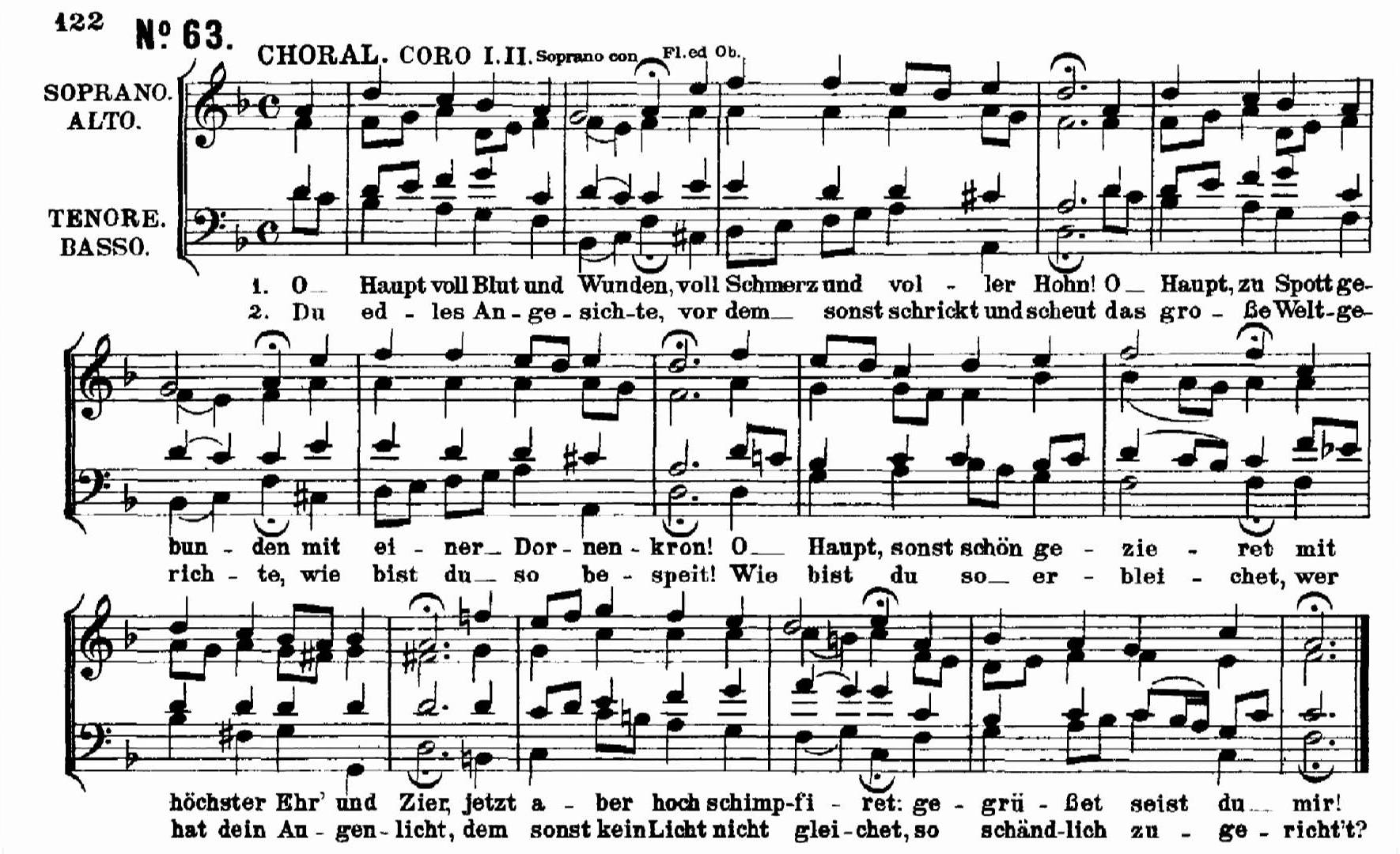
"O Haupt voll Blut und Wunden": the four-part chorale setting as included in the St Matthew Passion

Four-part harmony predates Bach, but he lived during a time when modal music in Western tradition was largely supplanted by the tonal system. In this system a piece of music progresses from one chord to the next according to certain rules, with each chord characterised by four notes. The principles of four-part harmony are found not only in Bach's four-part choral music; he also prescribes it for instance in figured bass accompaniment. The new system was at the core of Bach's style. Some examples of this characteristic of Bach's style and its influence:

- When in the 1740s Bach staged his arrangement of Pergolesi's Stabat Mater, he upgraded the viola part (which in the original composition plays in unison with the bass part) to fill in the harmony, thus adapting the composition to four-part harmony.
- When, starting in the 19th century in Russia, there was a discussion about the authenticity of four-part court chant settings compared to earlier Russian traditions, Bach's four-part chorale settings, such as those ending his Chorale cantatas, were considered foreign-influenced musical precedents, but such influence was deemed unavoidable.

Chromatic Fantasia and Fugue, BWV 903, performed by Kevin MacLeod
1. Fantasia

2. Fugue
Bach re-interpreting older genres tied to the modal system

Bach's insistence on the tonal system and contribution to shaping it did not imply he was less at ease with the older modal system and the genres associated with it: more than his contemporaries (who had "moved on" to the tonal system without much exception), he often returned to the then-antiquated modes and genres. His Chromatic Fantasia and Fugue, emulating the chromatic fantasia genre used by earlier composers such as John Dowland and Jan Pieterszoon Sweelinck in D Dorian mode (comparable to D minor in the tonal system), is an example. Bach's first biographer, Johann Nikolaus Forkel, wrote of Bach's original approach to this: "I have expended much effort to find another piece of this type by Bach. But it was in vain. This fantasy is unique and has always been second to none."

==== Modulation ====
Modulation, or changing key in the course of a piece, is another style characteristic where Bach goes beyond the norm in his time. Baroque instruments vastly limited modulation possibilities: keyboard instruments, before a workable system of temperament, limited the keys that could be modulated to, and wind instruments, especially brass instruments such as trumpets and horns, about a century before they were fitted with valves and crooks, were tied to the key of their tuning. Bach pushed the limits: he added "strange tones" in his organ playing, confusing the singers, according to an indictment he had to face in Arnstadt, and Louis Marchand, another early experimenter with modulation, seems to have avoided confrontation with Bach because the latter went further than anyone had done before. For example, in the Suscepit Israel of his 1723 Magnificat, he used a sophisticated compositional form in which the trumpets in E-flat play a melody in unfamiliar, variable-size quarter tones in the enharmonic scale of C minor.

The major development in Bach's time to which he was a significant contributor was a temperament for keyboard instruments that allowed their use in every key (12 major and 12 minor) and modulation without retuning. His Capriccio on the departure of a beloved brother, a very early work, showed a gusto for modulation unlike any contemporary work it has been compared to, but the full expansion came with The Well-Tempered Clavier, using all keys, which Bach apparently had been developing since around 1720, the Klavierbüchlein für Wilhelm Friedemann Bach being one of its earliest examples.

==== Ornamentation ====
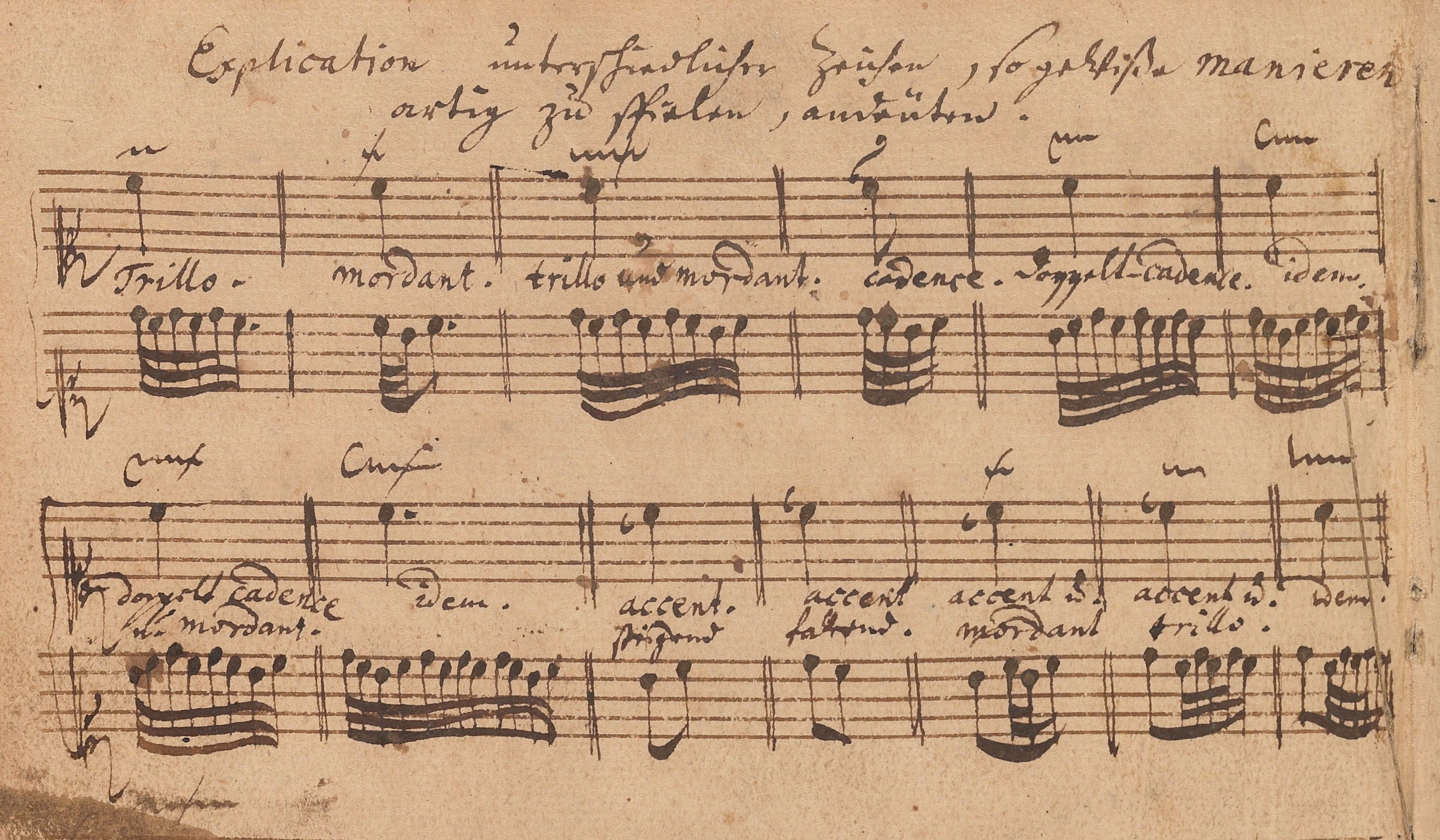
Bach's guide on ornaments as contained in the Klavierbüchlein für Wilhelm Friedemann Bach

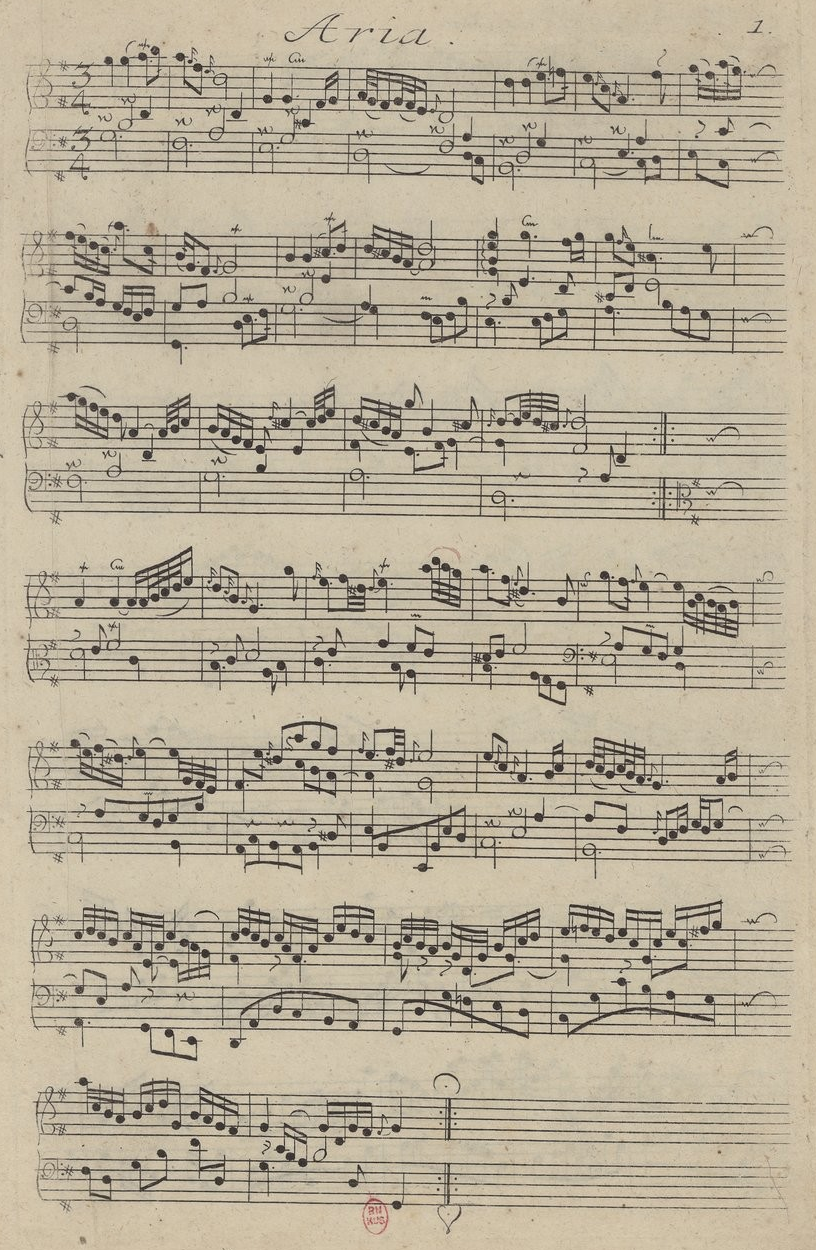
Aria of the Goldberg Variations, showing Bach's use of ornaments

The second page of the Klavierbüchlein für Wilhelm Friedemann Bach is an ornament notation and performance guide that Bach wrote for his eldest son, then nine years old. Bach was generally quite specific on ornamentation in his compositions (in his time, much ornamentation was not written out by composers but rather considered a liberty of the performer), and his ornamentation was often quite elaborate. For instance, the "Aria" of the Goldberg Variations has rich ornamentation in nearly every measure. Bach's approach to ornamentation can also be seen in a keyboard arrangement he made of Marcello's Oboe Concerto: he added explicit ornamentation, which centuries later is still played.

Although Bach wrote no formal operas, he was not averse to the genre or its ornamented vocal style, as in his Coffee Cantata. In church music, Italian composers had imitated the operatic vocal style in genres such as the Neapolitan mass. In Protestant surroundings, there was more reluctance to adopt such a style for liturgical music. Kuhnau had notoriously shunned opera and Italian virtuoso vocal music. Bach felt differently, and a performance of his St Matthew Passion was described as sounding like opera.

==== Continuo instrument solos ====
In concerted playing in Bach's time, the basso continuo, consisting of instruments such as viola da gamba or cello, and harpsichord or organ, usually had the role of accompaniment, providing a piece's harmonic and rhythmic foundation. Beginning in the 1720s Bach had the organ play concertante (i.e., as a soloist) with the orchestra in instrumental cantata movements, a decade before Handel published his first organ concertos. Apart from the fifth Brandenburg Concerto and the Triple Concerto, which already had harpsichord soloists in the 1720s, Bach wrote and arranged his harpsichord concertos in the 1730s, and in his sonatas for viola da gamba and harpsichord neither instrument plays a continuo part: they are treated as equal soloists, far beyond the figured bass. In this way, Bach played a key role in the development of genres such as the keyboard concerto.

==== Instrumentation ====
Bach wrote virtuoso music for specific instruments as well as music independent of instrumentation. For instance, the Sonatas and Partitas for Solo Violin are considered among the finest works written for violin, within reach of only accomplished players. The music fits the instrument, using the full gamut of its possibilities and requiring virtuosity but without bravura. Notwithstanding that the music and the instrument seem inseparable, Bach transcribed some pieces in this collection for other instruments. For example, Bach transcribed one of the Cello Suites for lute. In this sense, it is no surprise that Bach's music is easily and often performed on instruments it was not written for, that it is transcribed so often, and that his melodies turn up in unexpected places, such as jazz music. Apart from this, Bach left several compositions without specified instrumentation: the canons BWV 1072–1078 are in that category, as is the bulk of the Musical Offering and the Art of Fugue.

==== Counterpoint ====
Analysis of the counterpoint of the chorale prelude Herr Jesu Christ, dich zu uns wend', BWV 632 (Orgelbüchlein)
BWV 632 (extract) (0:48)
This video shows the intertwining of melodies and motives, including the melody of the chorale "Herr Jesu Christ, dich zu uns wend".

Sonata No. 3 in G minor for viola da gamba and harpsichord, BWV 1029, performed by John Michel
1st movement

2nd movement

3rd movement
Continuo instruments moving to the front (here performed on cello and piano)

Harpsichord Concerto in D minor, BWV 1052, performed by the Fulda Symphonic Orchestra conducted by Simon Schindler with Johannes Volker Schmidt (piano)
1. Allegro

2. Adagio

3. Allegro
Keyboard concerto

Double Violin Concerto in D minor BWV 1043 performed by the Advent Chamber Orchestra with David Perry and Roxana Pavel Goldstein (violins)
1. Vivace

2. Largo ma non tanto

3. Allegro
A strictly contrapuntal composition (the two violins playing in canon throughout) in the guise of an Italian type of concerto

Another characteristic of Bach's style is his extensive use of counterpoint, as opposed to the homophony used in his four-part chorale settings, for example. Bach's canons, and especially his fugues, are the most characteristic of this style, which he did not invent but contributed to so fundamentally as to influence many followers. Fugues are as characteristic of Bach's style as, for instance, sonata form is of the composers of the Classical period.

These strictly contrapuntal compositions, and most of Bach's music in general, are characterised by distinct melodic lines for each voice, where the chords formed by the notes sounding at a given point follow the rules of four-part harmony. Forkel, Bach's first biographer, gives this description of this feature of Bach's music, which sets it apart from most other music:

If the language of music is merely the utterance of a melodic line, a simple sequence of musical notes, it can justly be accused of poverty. The addition of a Bass puts it upon a harmonic foundation and clarifies it but defines rather than gives it added richness. A melody so accompanied—even though all the notes are not those of the true Bass—or treated with simple embellishments in the upper parts or with simple chords used to be called "homophony". But it is a very different thing when two melodies are so interwoven that they converse together like two persons upon a footing of pleasant equality/... From 1720, when he was thirty-five until he died in 1750, Bach's harmony consists in this melodic interweaving of independent melodies, so perfect in their union that each part seems to constitute the true melody... Even in his four-part writing, we can, not infrequently, leave out the upper and lower parts and still find the middle parts harmonious and agreeable.

==== Structure and lyrics ====
Bach devoted more attention than his contemporaries to the structure of his compositions. This can be seen in minor adjustments he made when adapting someone else's work, such as his earliest version of the "Keiser" St Mark Passion, where he enhances scene transitions, and in the architecture of his own work, such as his Magnificat and Leipzig Passions. In his last years, Bach revised several of his compositions, sometimes by recasting them in an enhanced structure for emphasis, as with, for example, the Mass in B minor. Bach's known preoccupation with structure led to various numerological analyses of his compositions. These peaked around the 1970s. Many were later rejected, especially those that wandered into symbolism-ridden hermeneutics.

The librettos, or lyrics, of his vocal compositions played an essential role for Bach. He sought collaboration with various text authors for his cantatas and major vocal compositions, possibly writing or adapting such texts himself to make them fit the structure of the composition when he could not rely on the talents of other text authors. His collaboration with Picander for the St Matthew Passion libretto is best known, but there was a similar process in achieving a multi-layered structure for his St John Passion libretto a few years earlier.

==== Fugue structure ====
Among the compositional techniques Bach used, the form of the fugue recurs throughout his work; a fugue (derived from the Latin for "flight" or "escape") is a contrapuntal, polyphonic compositional technique in two or more voices, built on a subject (a musical theme) introduced at the beginning in imitation (repetition at different pitches), which recurs frequently throughout the composition. Most fugues open with the subject, which then sounds successively in each voice. When each voice has completed its entry of the subject, the exposition is complete. This is often followed by a connecting passage, or episode, developed from previously heard material; further "entries" of the subject are then heard in related keys. Episodes (if applicable) and entries are usually alternated until the final entry of the subject, at which point the music has returned to the opening key, or tonic, which is often followed by a coda. Bach was well known for his fugues and shaped his own works after those of Jan Pieterszoon Sweelinck, Johann Jakob Froberger, Johann Pachelbel, Girolamo Frescobaldi, Dieterich Buxtehude and others.

=== Copies, arrangements, and uncertain attributions ===
Some of Bach's most popular melodies are, more often than not, heard in various arrangements:
Air on the G String (excerpt)
"Air", 2nd movement from Orchestral Suite No. 3 in D major, BWV 1068, performed in an Air on the G String adaptation by Cappella Istropolitana conducted by Oliver von Dohnányi (courtesy of Naxos)

"Sheep May Safely Graze" (instrumental version)
The aria "Schafe können sicher weiden" (Sheep May Safely Graze), No. 9 from the Hunting Cantata, BWV 208: composed for soprano, recorders, and continuo, the music of this movement exists in a variety of instrumental arrangements.

In his early youth, Bach copied pieces by other composers to learn from them. Later, he copied and arranged music for performance or as study material for his pupils. Some of these pieces, like "Bist du bei mir" (copied not by Bach but by Anna Magdalena), became famous before being associated with Bach. Bach copied and arranged Italian masters such as Vivaldi (e.g. BWV 1065), Pergolesi (BWV 1083) and Palestrina (Missa Sine nomine), French masters such as François Couperin (BWV Anh. 183), and various German masters, including Telemann (e.g. BWV 824=TWV 32:14) and Handel (arias from Brockes Passion), and music by members of his own family. He also often copied and arranged his own music (e.g. movements from cantatas for his short masses BWV 233–236), as his music was likewise copied and arranged by others. Some of these arrangements, like the late 19th-century "Air on the G String", helped to popularise Bach's music.

Who copied whom is sometimes unclear. For instance, Forkel mentions a Mass for double chorus among Bach's works. It was published and performed in the early 19th century. Although a score partially in Bach's handwriting exists, the work was later considered spurious. In 1950, the Bach-Werke-Verzeichnis was designed to keep such works out of the main catalogue; if there was a strong association with Bach, they could be listed in its appendix (German: Anhang, abbreviated as Anh.). Thus, for instance, the Mass for double chorus became BWV Anh. 167. But this was far from the end of the attribution problems. For instance, Schlage doch, gewünschte Stunde, BWV 53, was later attributed to Melchior Hoffmann. For other works, Bach's authorship was put in doubt: the best-known organ composition in the BWV catalogue, the Toccata and Fugue in D minor, BWV 565, was one of these uncertain works in the late 20th century.

== Reception and legacy ==
In the 18th century Bach's music was appreciated mostly by distinguished connoisseurs. The first biography of Bach was published at the beginning of the 19th century and the Bach Gesellschaft completed and published all his known works at the end of the century. Starting with the Bach Revival, Bach began to be regarded as one of the greatest composers, a reputation he has maintained. The BACH motif, which he occasionally used in his compositions, has been used in dozens of tributes to him since the 19th century.

=== 18th century ===
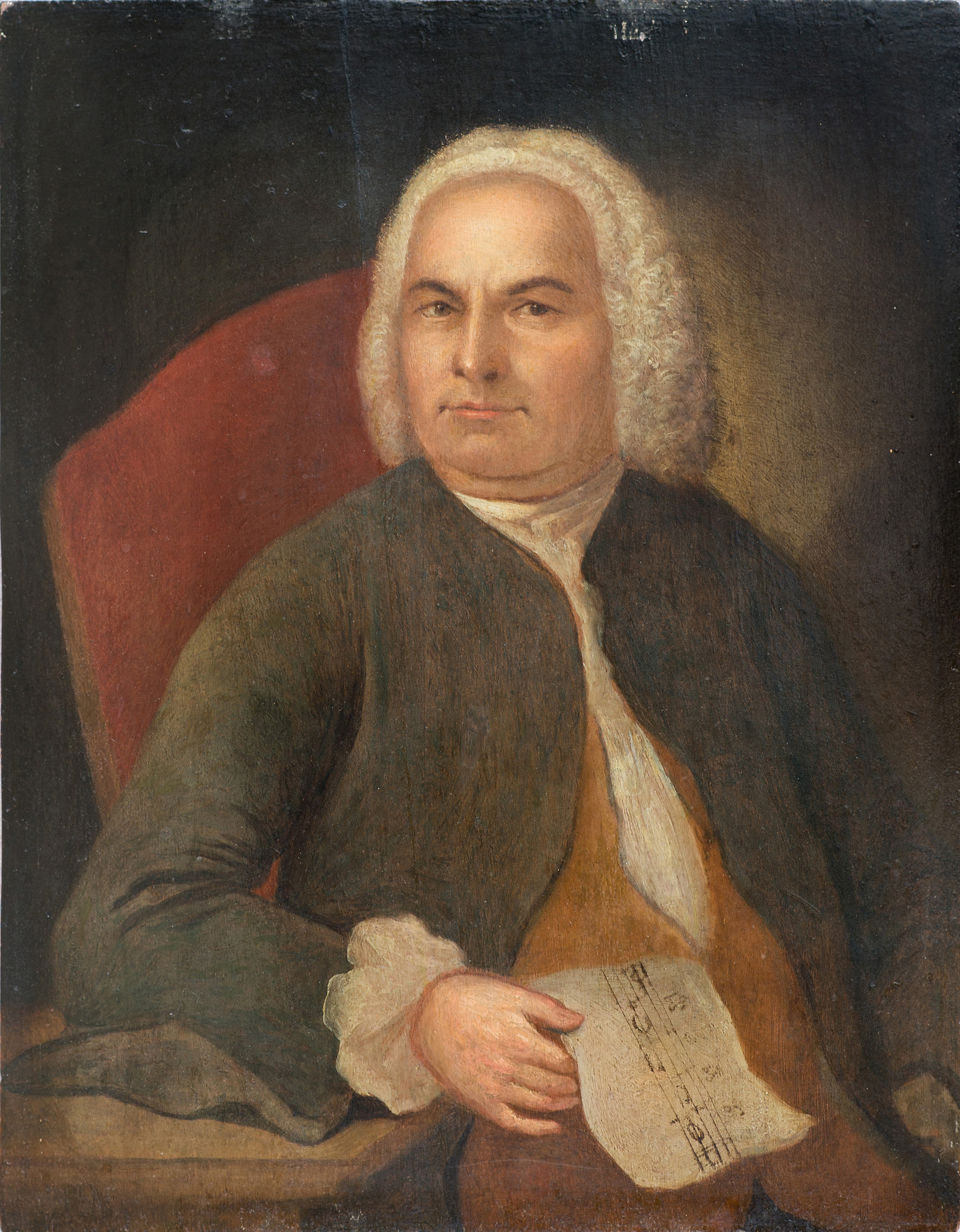
Painting of Bach by 'Gebel', before 1798

Through the later half of the 18th century, Carl Philipp Emanuel Bach's reputation was very high, surpassing his father's. Joseph Haydn, Wolfgang Amadeus Mozart, and Ludwig van Beethoven admired him and "avidly" collected his music. Mozart said of Carl Philipp Emanuel, "Bach is the father, we are the children." (Note: Rochlitz (1824–1832), pp. 308ff quoted in Ottenberg (1987), p. 98 & 191) But throughout his life, Carl Philipp Emanuel continued to recognize many aspects of his father's originality in his own compositions, which were often received in preference to his father's after his father died.

In his own time, Bach was highly regarded by his colleagues, but his reputation outside this small circle of connoisseurs was due not to his compositions (which had an extremely narrow circulation), but to his virtuosic abilities. Nevertheless, during his life, Bach received public recognition, such as the title of court composer by Augustus III of Poland and the appreciation he was shown by Frederick the Great and Hermann Karl von Keyserling. This appreciation contrasted with the humiliations he faced, for instance, in Leipzig. Bach also had detractors in the contemporary press (Johann Adolf Scheibe suggested he write less complex music) and supporters, such as Johann Mattheson and Lorenz Christoph Mizler. After the composer's death, Bach's reputation for composing initially declined: his work was regarded as old-fashioned compared to the emerging galant style. He was remembered more as a virtuoso organ player and a teacher. The bulk of the music printed during his lifetime was for organ or harpsichord.

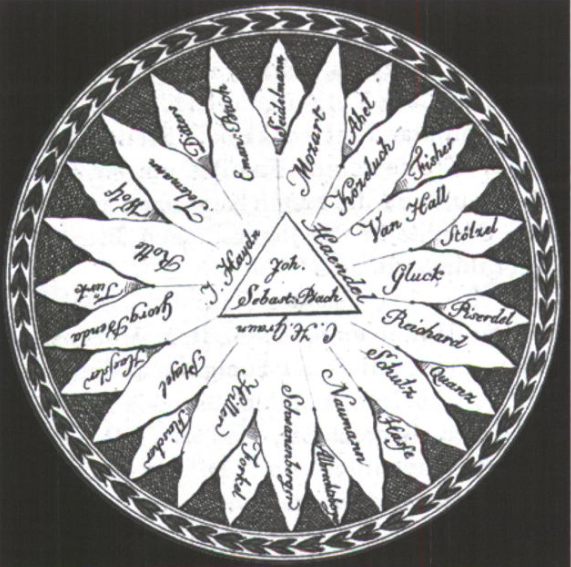
Augustus Frederic Christopher Kollmann's diagram of Bach as the centre of the musical universe, included by Johann Nikolaus Forkel in the Allgemeine Musikalische Zeitung in October 1799

Bach's surviving family members, who inherited many of his manuscripts, were not all equally concerned with preserving them, leading to considerable losses. Carl Philipp Emanuel was most active in safeguarding his father's legacy: he co-authored his father's obituary, contributed to the publication of his four-part chorales, presented some of his works, and helped preserve the bulk of his previously unpublished work. Wilhelm Friedemann, the eldest son, performed several of his father's cantatas in Halle but, after becoming unemployed, sold part of his large collection of his father's works, some of which apparently sold for scrap paper value. Several of Bach's students, such as his son-in-law Johann Christoph Altnickol, Johann Friedrich Agricola, Johann Kirnberger, and Johann Ludwig Krebs, contributed to the dissemination of his legacy. The early devotees were not all musicians; for example, Itzig, a high official of Frederick the Great who venerated Bach, was not. His eldest daughters took lessons from Kirnberger and their sister Sara from Wilhelm Friedemann Bach, who was in Berlin from 1774 to 1784. Sara Itzig Levy became an avid collector of work by J. S. Bach and his sons and a patron of C. P. E. Bach.

While Bach was in Leipzig, performances of his church music were limited to some of his motets and, under his student cantor Johann Friedrich Doles, some of his Passions. A new generation of Bach aficionados emerged who studiously collected and copied his music, including some of his large-scale works, such as the Mass in B minor, and performed them privately. One was Gottfried van Swieten, a high-ranking Austrian official who was instrumental in passing Bach's legacy on to the composers of the Viennese school. Haydn owned manuscript copies of The Well-Tempered Clavier and the Mass in B minor and was influenced by Bach's music. Mozart owned a copy of one of Bach's motets, transcribed some of his instrumental works (Preludes and Fugues for Violin, Viola and Cello, K. 404a (1782), Fugues for 2 Violins, Viola and Cello, K. 405 (1782)), and wrote contrapuntal music influenced by his style. Beethoven had learned The Well-Tempered Clavier in its entirety by the time he was 11 in 1781 and called Bach the Urvater der Harmonie (progenitor of harmony).

=== 19th century ===
In 1802 Johann Nikolaus Forkel published Johann Sebastian Bach: His Life, Art, and Work, the first Bach biography, dedicated to van Swieten. In 1805, Abraham Mendelssohn, who learned of some Bach's manuscripts by marriage to one of Daniel Itzig's granddaughters, bought a substantial collection of these manuscripts that had come down from C. P. E. Bach, and donated it to the Berlin Sing-Akademie. The Sing-Akademie occasionally performed Bach's works in public concerts, for instance his first keyboard concerto, with Sara Itzig Levy at the piano. Since the 19th-century Bach Revival, he has been widely regarded as one of the greatest composers in the history of Western music.

The first decades of the 19th century saw an increasing number of first publications of Bach's music: Breitkopf & Härtel started publishing chorale preludes, Hoffmeister harpsichord music, and The Well-Tempered Clavier was printed concurrently by N. Simrock (Germany), Hans Georg Nägeli (Switzerland) and Franz Anton Hoffmeister (Germany and Austria) in 1801. Vocal music was also published: motets in 1802 and 1803, followed by the E♭ major version of the Magnificat, the Kyrie-Gloria Mass in A major, and the cantata Ein feste Burg ist unser Gott, BWV 80. In 1818 the publisher Hans Georg Nägeli called the Mass in B minor the greatest composition ever. Bach's influence was felt in the next generation of early Romantic composers. Abraham's son Felix, aged 13, produced his first Magnificat setting in 1822, and it is clearly inspired by the then-unpublished D major version of Bach's Magnificat.

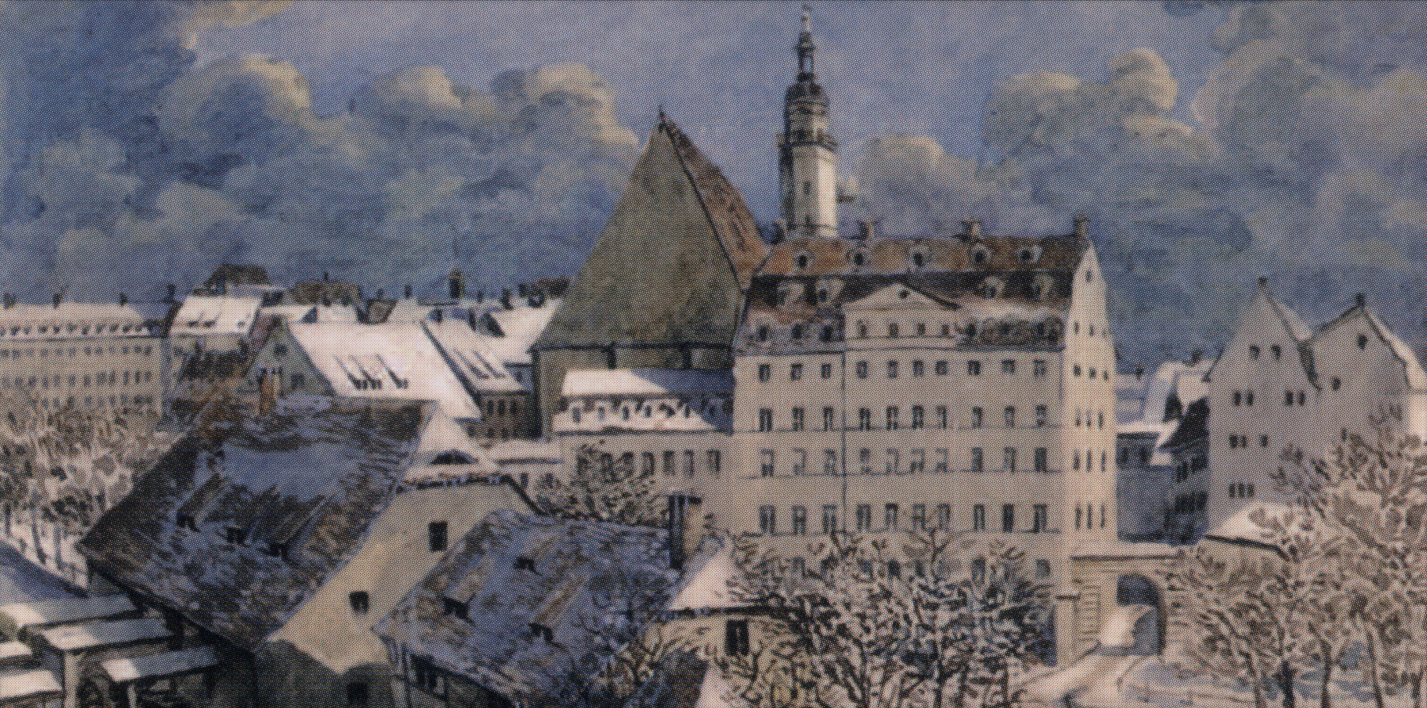
Mendelssohn's watercolour of the Thomaskantorei, 1838

Felix Mendelssohn's 1829 performance of the St Matthew Passion precipitated the Bach Revival. The St John Passion saw its 19th-century premiere in 1833, and the first public performance of the Mass in B minor followed in 1844. Besides these and other public performances and increased coverage of the composer and his compositions in printed media, the 1830s and 1840s also saw the first publication of more Bach vocal works: six cantatas, the St Matthew Passion, and the Mass in B minor. A series of organ compositions were first published in 1833. Frédéric Chopin started composing his 24 Preludes, Op. 28, inspired by The Well-Tempered Clavier, in 1835, and Robert Schumann published his Sechs Fugen über den Namen BACH in 1845. Bach's music was transcribed and arranged to suit contemporary tastes and performance practice by composers such as Carl Friedrich Zelter, Robert Franz, and Franz Liszt, or combined with new music such as the melody line of Charles Gounod's "Ave Maria". Liszt developed an interest in J. S. Bach's organ music in the early 1840s, probably due to Mendelssohn's influence, and commissioned a "piano-organ" from the Paris company Alexandre Père et Fils. The instrument was made in 1854 under Berlioz's supervision, using an 1853 Érard piano, and was a combination of piano and harmonium with three manuals and a pedal board; Liszt later transcribed works by Bach such as his Great Fantasia and Fugue in G minor, BWV 542 for solo piano performance as S.463.

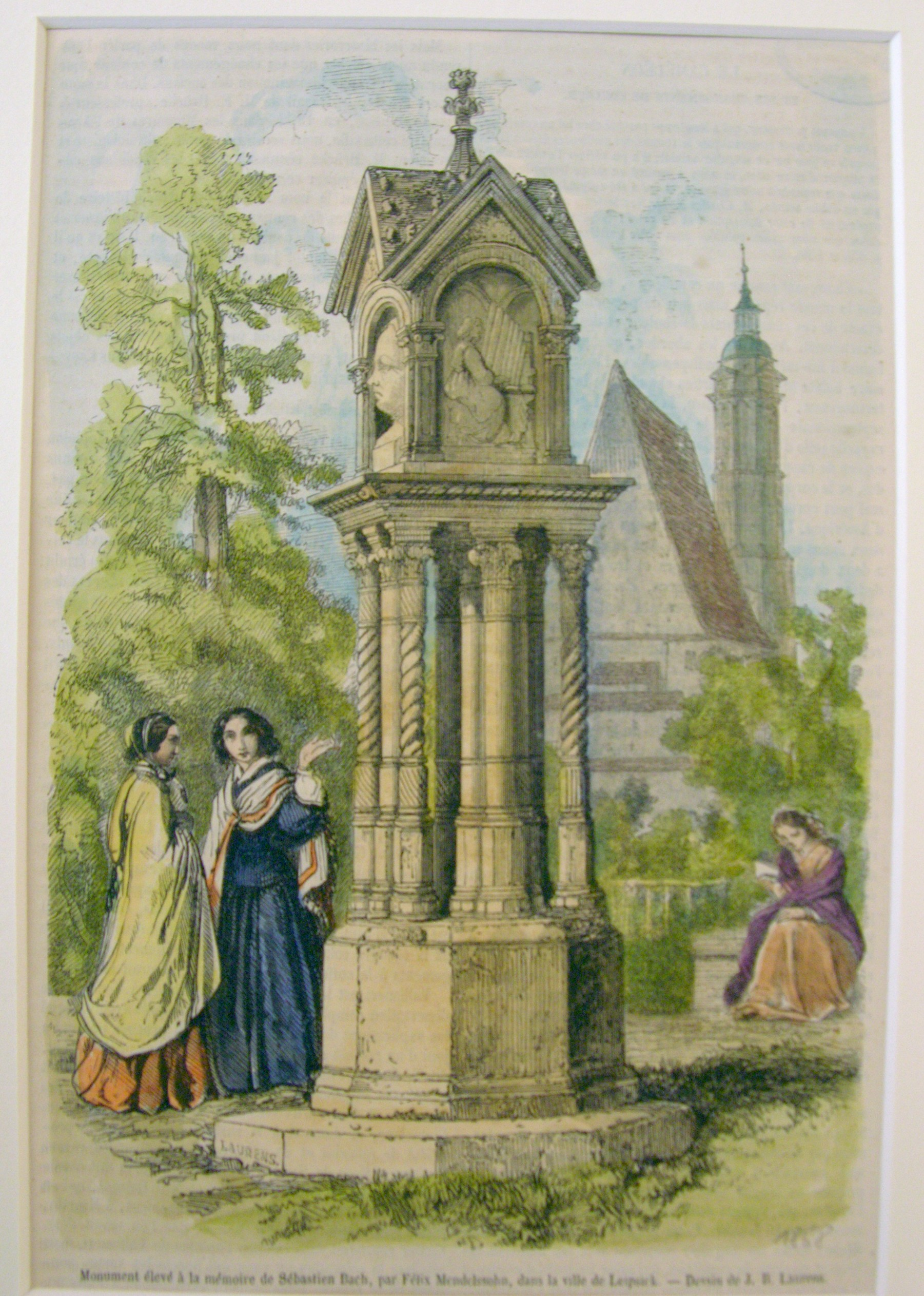
Image of the Old Bach Monument donated by Felix Mendelssohn, designed by Eduard Bendemann, Ernst Rietschel, and Julius Hübner in Leipzig in 1843

In 1850 the Bach-Gesellschaft (Bach Society) was founded to promote Bach's music. The Society chose Wie schön leuchtet der Morgenstern, BWV 1 as the first composition in the first volume of the Bach-Gesellschaft Ausgabe (BGA). Robert Schumann, the publisher of the Neue Zeitschrift für Musik, Thomaskantor Moritz Hauptmann, and the philologist Otto Jahn initiated this first complete edition of Bach's works a century after the composer's death. Its first volume was published in 1851, edited by Hauptmann. In the second half of the 19th century, the Society published a comprehensive edition of his works. In 1854, Bach was deemed one of the Three Bs by Peter Cornelius, the others being Beethoven and Berlioz. (Hans von Bülow later replaced Berlioz with Brahms.) From 1873 to 1880 Philipp Spitta published Johann Sebastian Bach, the standard work on Bach's life and music. During the 19th century, 200 books were published on Bach. By the end of the century, local Bach societies were established in several cities, and his music had been performed in all major musical centres. In 1870, Friedrich Nietzsche wrote to Erwin Rohde: "This week I heard the St Matthew Passion three times and each time I had the same feeling of immeasurable admiration. One who has completely forgotten Christianity truly hears it here as Gospel." In 19th-century Germany, Bach was coupled with nationalist feeling. In England, Bach was coupled with a revival of religious and Baroque music. By the end of the century, Bach was firmly established as one of the greatest composers, recognised for both his instrumental and his vocal music, and all of his then known music had been printed.

=== 20th century ===
During the 20th century, recognition of the musical and pedagogic value of Bach's works continued, as in the promotion of the Cello Suites by Pablo Casals, the first major performer to record them. Claude Debussy called Bach the composer "to whom musicians should offer a prayer before setting to work so that they may be preserved from mediocrity." Glenn Gould's debut 1955 recording of the Goldberg Variations transformed the work from an obscure piece often considered esoteric to part of the standard piano repertoire. The album had "astonishing" sales for a classical work: it was reported to have sold 40,000 copies by 1960, and had sold more than 100,000 by the time of Gould's death in 1982. Andres Segovia edited and transcribed many Bach works for classical guitar, notably a transcription of the Chaconne from the 2nd Partita for Violin (BWV 1004).

A significant development in the later 20th century was historically informed performance practice, with forerunners such as Nikolaus Harnoncourt acquiring prominence through their performances of Bach's music. Bach's keyboard music was again performed on the harpsichord and other Baroque instruments rather than on modern pianos and 19th-century romantic organs. Ensembles playing and singing Bach's music not only kept to the instruments and the performance style of his day but were also reduced to the size of the groups Bach used for his performances. But that was not the only way Bach's music came to the forefront in the 20th century: his music was heard in versions ranging from Ferruccio Busoni's late-romantic Bach-Busoni Editions for piano to the orchestrations of Leopold Stokowski, whose interpretation of the Toccata and Fugue in D minor opened Disney's Fantasia film.

Bach's music has influenced other genres. Jazz musicians have adapted it, with Jacques Loussier, Ian Anderson, Uri Caine, and the Modern Jazz Quartet among those creating jazz versions of his works. Several 20th-century composers referred to Bach or his music, for example Eugène Ysaÿe in Six Sonatas for solo violin, Dmitri Shostakovich in 24 Preludes and Fugues, and Heitor Villa-Lobos in Bachianas Brasileiras (tr. Bach-inspired Brazilian pieces). A wide variety of publications involved Bach: there were the Bach Jahrbuch publications of the Neue Bachgesellschaft and various other biographies and studies by, among others, Albert Schweitzer, Charles Sanford Terry, Alfred Dürr, Christoph Wolff, Peter Williams, and John Butt, (Note: See Schweitzer 1911 (1905 and 1908 editions; Terry 1928; Dürr 1981; Dürr & Jones 2006 (English translation); Wolff 1991; Wolff 2000; Williams 1980; Butt 1997) and the 1950 first edition of the Bach-Werke-Verzeichnis. Books such as Gödel, Escher, Bach put the composer's art in a wider perspective. Bach's music was extensively listened to, performed, broadcast, arranged, adapted, and commented upon in the 1990s. Around 2000, the 250th anniversary of Bach's death, three record companies issued box sets of recordings of his complete works.

Three works by Bach are featured on the Voyager Golden Records, gramophone records containing a broad sample of the images, sounds, languages, and music of Earth, sent into space with the two Voyager probes: the first movement of Brandenburg Concerto No. 2 (conducted by Karl Richter), the "Gavotte en rondeaux" from the Partita for Violin No. 3 (played by Arthur Grumiaux), and the Prelude and Fugue No. 1 in C major from The Well-Tempered Clavier (played by Glenn Gould). Twentieth-century tributes to Bach include statues erected in his honour and things such as streets and space objects named after him. A multitude of musical ensembles, such as the Bach Aria Group, Deutsche Bachsolisten, Bachchor Stuttgart, and Bach Collegium Japan took the composer's name. Bach festivals were held on several continents, and competitions and prizes such as the International Johann Sebastian Bach Competition, Johann Sebastian Bach International Piano Competition (Washington, D.C.), and the Royal Academy of Music Bach Prize were named after him. While by the end of the 19th century, Bach had been inscribed in nationalism and religious revival, the late 20th century saw Bach as the subject of a secularised art-as-religion (Kunstreligion).

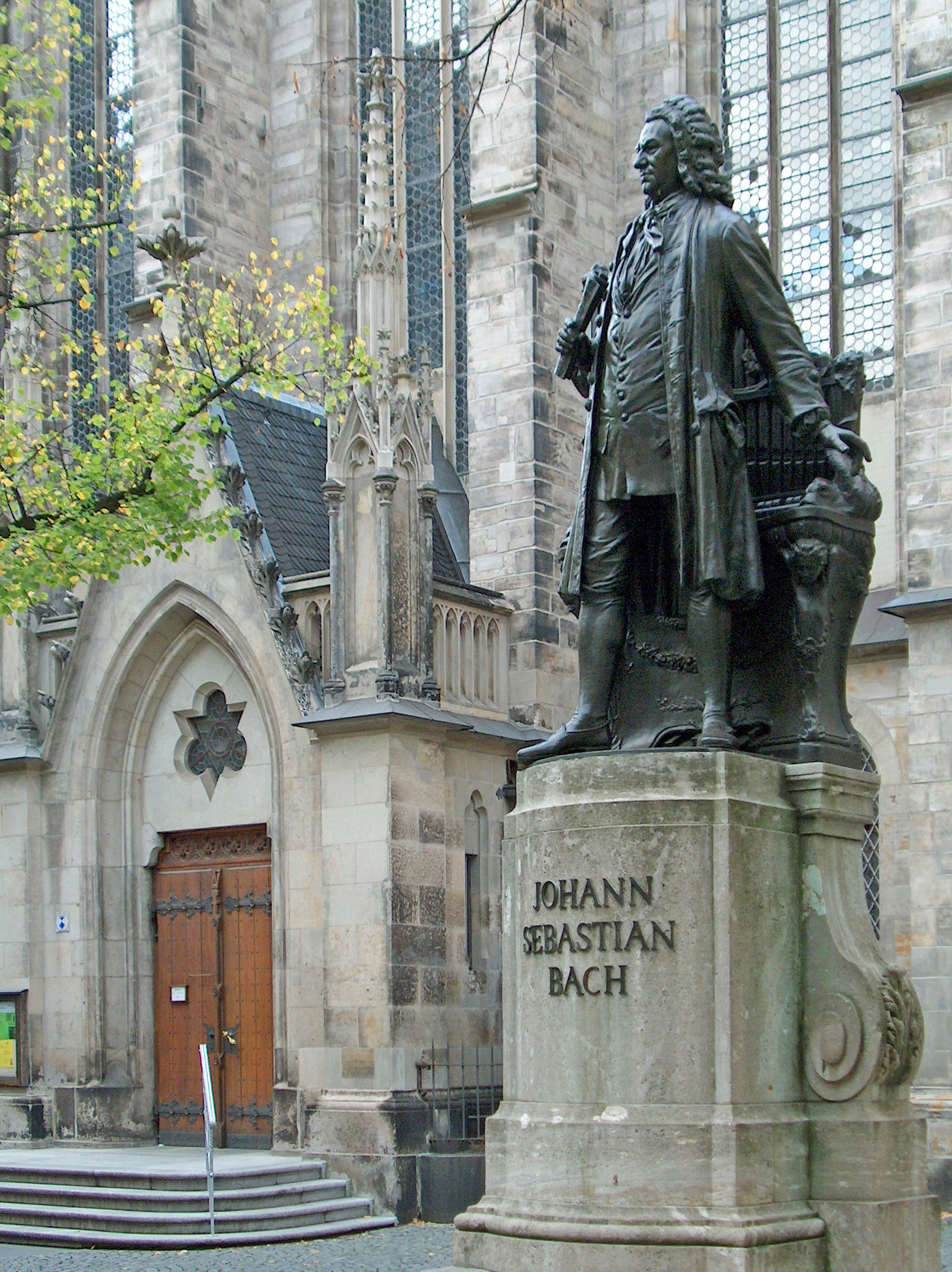
1908
Statue of Bach in front of the Thomaskirche

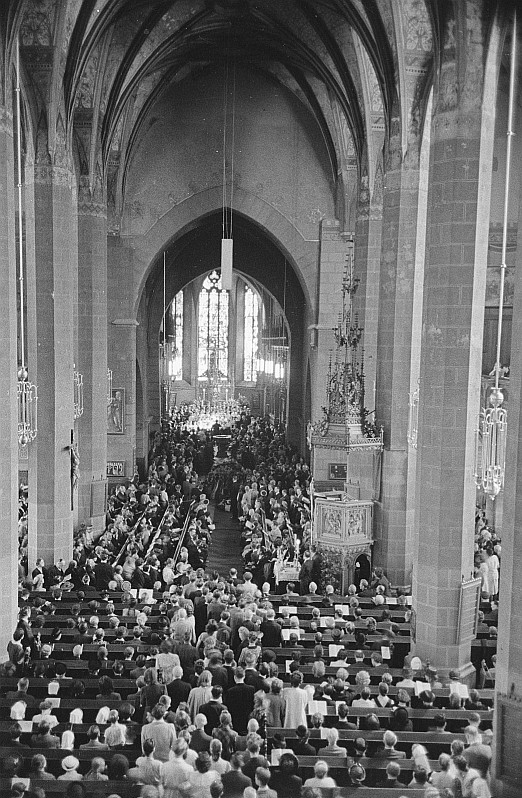
28 July 1950
memorial service in the Thomaskirche on the 200th anniversary of Bach's death

=== 21st century ===
In the 21st century Bach's compositions have become available online, for instance at the International Music Score Library Project. High-resolution facsimiles of Bach's autographs became available at the Bach Digital website. 21st-century biographers include Christoph Wolff, Peter Williams, and John Eliot Gardiner. (Note: See Wolff 2000; Williams 2003a; Williams 2007; Williams 2016; Gardiner 2013) In 2011 Anthony Tommasini, chief classical music critic of The New York Times, ranked Bach the greatest composer of all time, "for his matchless combination of masterly musical engineering (as one reader put it) and profound expressivity. ...Haydn was 18 when Bach died, in 1750, and Classicism was stirring. Bach was surely aware of the new trends. Yet he reacted by digging deeper... [creating] his austerely beautiful Art of Fugue, ...[and] through his chorales alone Bach explored the far reaches of tonal harmony."

Alex Ross wrote, "Bach became an absolute master of his art... His most exalted sacred works—the two extant Passions, from the seventeen-twenties, and the Mass in B Minor, completed not long before his death in 1750—are feats of synthesis, mobilizing secular devices to spiritual ends... They honour, with consummate skill, the scholastic discipline of canon and fugue... Their furious development of brief motifs anticipates Beethoven, who worshipped Bach when he was young. And their most daring harmonic adventures—for example, the otherworldly modulations in the 'Confiteor' of the B-Minor Mass—look ahead to Wagner, even to Schoenberg." The liturgical calendar of the Episcopal Church celebrates Bach's feast day on 28 July; on the same day, the Calendar of Saints of some Lutheran churches, such as the ELCA, remembers Bach, Handel, and Heinrich Schütz. As of 2013 over 150 recordings have been made of The Well-Tempered Clavier. In 2015 Bach's handwritten personal copy of the Mass in B minor, held by the Berlin State Library, was added to UNESCO's Memory of the World Register. On 21 March 2019, Bach was celebrated in an interactive Google Doodle that used machine learning to synthesize a tune in his signature style.

== See also ==
- Portraits of Johann Sebastian Bach
