= List of transcriptions of compositions by Johann Sebastian Bach =

Johann Sebastian Bach's music has often been transcribed for other instruments.

== Bach's lifetime ==
Bach himself was an inveterate transcriber of his works for other musical forces. For example:

- Sonatas and partitas for solo violin, BWV 1001–1006
- Violin Concerto in A minor, BWV 1041
- Violin Concerto in E major, BWV 1042
- Double Violin Concerto (Bach), BWV 1043
- Toccata and Fugue in D minor, BWV 565 (suspected to be a transcription of a violin original, by Bach himself or another composer).

== Classical era ==
- Working at the behest of Gottfried van Swieten, Wolfgang Amadeus Mozart arranged some of the fugues from The Well-Tempered Clavier for string quartet (K. 405). His K. 404a contains transcriptions for string trio of a few more fugues from The Well-Tempered Clavier and of some other works by Bach.
- Ludwig van Beethoven arranged Fugue No. 22 in B-flat minor, BWV 867/2, from the Well-Tempered Clavier book 1, for string quintet (Hess 38).

== Romantic era ==
- Ferruccio Busoni made a piano transcription of the chaconne from the Violin Partita No. 2 in D minor, as did Johannes Brahms and others. For more Bach transcriptions by Busoni, see:
  - List of adaptations by Ferruccio Busoni#Transcriptions (BV B 20 to 115)
  - Bach-Busoni Editions
- Charles Gounod's Ave Maria is based on Prelude No. 1 of Book I of The Well-Tempered Clavier.
- Francisco Tárrega transcribed a variety of Bach works, including his Fugue from Violin Sonata No. 1, BWV 1001
- Franz Liszt arranged Prelude and Fugue in A minor, BWV 543, Prelude and Fugue in B minor, BWV 544, Prelude and Fugue in C major, BWV 545, Prelude and Fugue in C minor, BWV 546, Prelude and Fugue in C major, BWV 547, Prelude and Fugue in E minor, BWV 548, Great Fantasia and Fugue in G minor, BWV 542, and Movement 2 of Weinen, Klagen, Sorgen, Zagen, BWV 12 (also the same as the Crucifixus from the Mass in B minor BWV 232) for piano, and Movement 3 of the Violin Sonata in C minor, BWV 1017, the same music mentioned above from Weinen, Klagen, Sorgen, Zagen, BWV 12, the Introduction and Fugue from Ich hatte viel Bekümmernis, BWV 21, and the Andante from Aus tiefer Not schrei ich zu dir, BWV 38 for Organ or Harmonium.
  - See Franz Liszt's treatments of the works of other composers#Johann Sebastian Bach
- Edward MacDowell (1860–1908) produced "Six Little Pieces after sketches by J. S. Bach" (1890) for piano solo.
- August Stradal (1860–1930) arranged several of Bach's Organ Sonatas for piano solo (ca. 1900).

== 20th century ==
Sonata in G minor BWV 1001 Presto
Arranged for alto saxophone, performed by David Hernando Vitores (1:49)

- Harrison Birtwistle arranged a number of Bach organ works as Bach Measures, for chamber orchestra (1996)
- Edward Elgar transcribed Bach's Fantasia and Fugue in C minor BWV 537 for orchestra
- Sergei Rachmaninoff made a transcription of the Violin Partita in E major, BWV 1006, including the following movements: prelude, gavotte and gigue.
- Max Reger and Walter Morse Rummel both made many transcriptions of Bach works.
- Leopold Stokowski made a large number of transcriptions for full orchestra, including the Toccata and Fugue in D minor for organ, which appeared in the film Fantasia and the Little Fugue in G minor.
- Alexander Siloti made many piano transcriptions of Bach, most famously his Prelude in B minor based on Bach's Prelude in E minor, BWV 855a.
- Andrés Segovia was famous for his playing arrangements of Bach works transcribed for classical guitar, such as his very difficult Chaconne from the Violin Partita in D minor.
- Arnold Schoenberg arranged for orchestra Bach's organ Prelude and Fugue in E-flat major St Anne, BWV 552.
- Igor Stravinsky made an arrangement of the Canonic Variations on "Vom Himmel hoch da komm' ich her" in 1956.
- Igor Stravinsky's last work was a transcription of Four Preludes and Fugues from Das Wohltemperirte Clavier
- William Walton's ballet The Wise Virgins (1940) consists of orchestrations of movements from Bach's cantatas and chorale preludes.
- Anton Webern arranged the ricercar from The Musical Offering for orchestra.
- Marcel Grandjany transcribed movements of the Sonatas and Partitas for Unaccompanied Violin for the harp in his book of Etudes.
- The Modern Jazz Quartet frequently performed compositions of Bach as transcribed for the instruments of their ensemble.
- Violinists interested in historically informed performance, notably Andrew Manze, have created "anti-transcriptions"; that is, reconstructed hypothetical original versions for violin, of the Toccata and Fugue in D minor for organ.
- The Passacaglia and Fugue in C minor, BWV 582, has been arranged by a number of composers.
- Jacques Loussier Trio transcribed several Bach's compositions
- The Swingle Singers devoted entire albums to transcriptions of Bach's work (Bach's Greatest Hits and Back to Bach)
- Wendy Carlos transcribed and performed many works by Bach on the Moog Synthesizer on several albums including Switched-On Bach issued by Columbia Masterworks.

== 21st century ==
- Luciano Berio arranged Bach's Contrapunctus XIX from Die Kunst der Fuge for 23 players (2001).
