= Georg Christoph Stertzing =

German organ builder

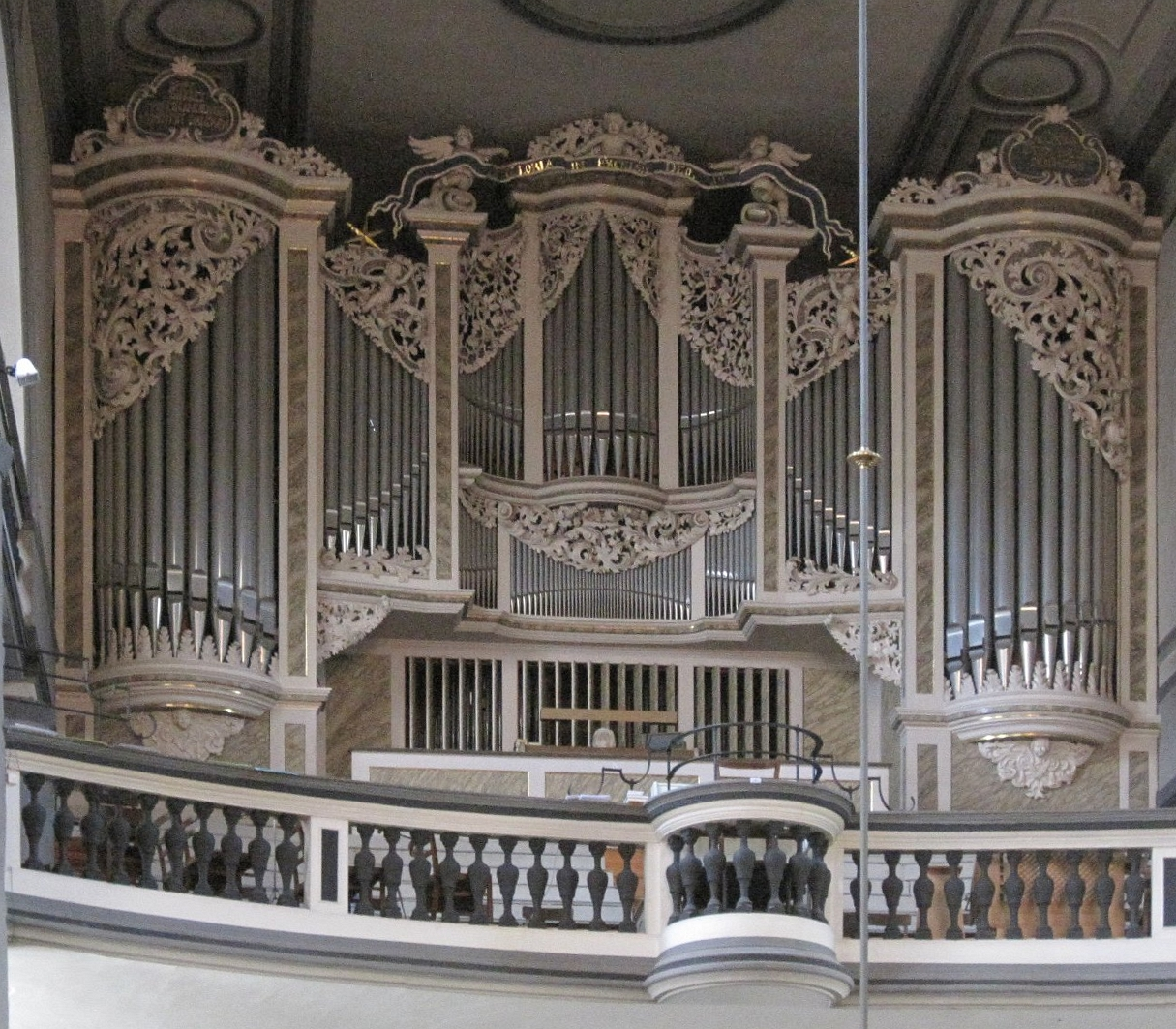
Stertzing's Prospekt of the organ in the Eisenach Georgenkirche

Georg Christoph Stertzing (c. 1650 – Eisenach, 21 November 1717) was a German organ builder. Stertzing, described by Christoph Wolff as "famed", had connections with Johann Sebastian Bach well into the 1730s.

== Life and career ==
Stertzing became the successor of the Eisenach organ builder Christoph Nott in 1690 and was thus responsible for the maintenance of the organs in the city. He worked closely with the church musician Johann Christoph Bach, with whom he designed his most important work, the organ of the Georgenkirche. In 1701 he traveled to Magdeburg on behalf of the city. There it was possible to get to know the works of Arp Schnitger. Sterzing's work was held in high esteem by his contemporaries, and he is mentioned in Burney's travel diaries.

His brothers Johann Christian and Johann Friedrich were also active as organ builders. One of Stertzing's students was Johann Georg Fincke.

Two of his sons, Johann Friedrich and Johann Georg, pursued the same career. The former became court organ builder in Kassel, building instruments there and in the surrounding area.
