= Capriccio on the departure of a beloved brother, BWV 992 =

Composition by Johann Sebastian Bach

The Capriccio on the departure of a beloved brother (Italian: Capriccio sopra la lontananza del suo fratello dilettissimo), BWV 992, is an early work by Johann Sebastian Bach, possibly modeled on the Biblical Sonatas of Johann Kuhnau. The story that Bach performed it at age nineteen when his brother Johann Jacob left to become an oboist in the army of Charles XII of Sweden is questionable. But the chosen tonality of B-flat major seems to be a deliberate reference to the family's name ("B" in German is B-flat in English).

== Structure ==
Capriccio on the departure of a beloved brother
Performed by Silvia Kind

1. Arioso: Adagio – 'Friends Gather & Try to Dissuade Him from departing'
2. (Andante) – 'They Picture the Dangers Which May Befall Him'
3. Adagiosissimo (or Adagissimo) – 'The Friends' Lament'
4. (Andante con moto) – 'Since He Cannot Be Dissuaded, They Say Farewell'
5. Allegro poco – 'Aria of the Postilion' (Aria di postiglione)
6. 'Fugue in Imitation of the Postilion's Horn' (Fuga all'imitazione della cornetta di postiglione)
