= Johann Jacob Bach =

German musician, composer

Johann Jacob Bach (or Johann Jakob) (baptised 21 February [O.S. 11 February] 1682 – 16 April 1722) was a German musician, composer and an older brother of Johann Sebastian Bach.

Bach is thought to have been born in Eisenach. After his studies at the Latin school there, he became oboist in the municipal band. After the death of their father Johann Ambrosius Bach in 1695, Johann Jacob and Johann Sebastian moved in with their older brother Johann Christoph Bach, organist at Ohrdruf. In 1704, he entered the service in the military band of the army of King Charles XII of Sweden. It is thought that Johann Sebastian Bach wrote his Capriccio on the departure of his Beloved Brother BWV 992 on this occasion.

In 1709, he participated in the Battle of Poltava. During his stay in Constantinople, he studied flute under Pierre-Gabriel Buffardin. From 1713 to 1722, he served as flutist in the court of the Stockholm capelle. He died childless in 1722 in Stockholm and is buried there.

Johann Jacob played oboe, flute and possibly violin. He probably composed the Sonata in C minor under the name Signor Bach.

== Sources ==
For other references, see list of references on the Spanish Wikipedia article on es:Johann Jacob Bach
