= Bachchor Stuttgart =

Bachchor Stuttgart, also known variously as Stuttgart Bach Choir & Orchestra, Bach Orchestra Stuttgart, Stuttgarter Bach-Chor und Orchester (Choir & Orchestra), Bachchor und Bachorchester Stuttgart, Bachchor und Bach-Orchester Stuttgart, Stuttgart Bach Orchestra, Stuttgarter Chor und Orchester and L'ensemble vocal et instrumental de Stuttgart, is an orchestra and choir based in Stuttgart, Germany. Established around 1954, they are dedicated to the works of J. S. Bach. However, they also perform other works, for instance in July 2004 they performed at the Europäische Kirchenmusik Schwäbisch Gmünd festival of the City Church of Vienna, performing works of Adriana Hölszky.
