= Kunstreligion =

Kunstreligion is a polysemantic word used around the turn of the nineteenth century to refer to Art-as-religion, specifically in music, but also to refer to any art that was sacralized.

In early 2007 the Center for Comparative Studies at Uni Göttingen hosted a conference on the topic; Süddeutsche Zeitung reported.

== See also ==
- Gesamtkunstwerk
- Secularization

== Bibliography ==
- Andreas Kablitz: Kunstreligion. Ein europäisches Phänomen. In: Religion im säkularen Europa, ed. A. Kablitz & O. Höffe, Paderborn 2018, pp. 157–200.
