= Nun danket alle Gott (Pachelbel) =

- Motet by Johann Pachelbel
- English: Now thank we all our God
- Catalogue: P. 381
- Text: Ecclesiasticus 50:22-24; "Nun danket alle Gott"
- Language: German
- Published: 1954
- Scoring: 2 SATB choirs; basso continuo

Nun danket alle Gott (Now thank we all our God), P. 381, is a motet for two four-part choirs by Johann Pachelbel. The composer set Ecclesiasticus 50:22-24 for double choir in a first section, followed by the first stanza of the hymn "Nun danket alle Gott" with its tune as a cantus firmus. Bärenreiter published the motet in 1954.

== History and music ==
Johann Pachelbel (1653–1706), who was church musician at the Predigerkirche in Erfurt from 1678 to 1690, composed the motet Nun danket alle Gott, scored for a double chorus and basso continuo. In a first section, the two choirs are used antiphonally for the Biblical text from Ecclesiasticus 50:22-24. This is followed by a chorale setting of the first stanza of the "Nun danket alle Gott" that Martin Rinkart based on the same passage. The chorale melody is quoted completely as a cantus firmus in the soprano, on top of three lively voices in polyphony. The motet, as the ten others by the composer including the Psalm settings Singet dem Herrn ein neues Lied and Tröste, tröste uns, Gott, focus on a rich sound of the many voices, but remains simple in melody and harmony. They are intended to serve in church services. The motet can be performed by two groups of musicians at different locations, for a stronger antiphonal effect, and with various instruments reinforcing the voices, or even replacing all voices of the second choir.

Bärenreiter published the motet, with both German and English text, in 1954, edited by Hans Heinrich Eggebrecht. Its 21st edition appeared in 2008. Carus-Verlag published it in German, edited by Dietrich Krüger.

The motet was recorded in 1994 in a collection of motets by Pachelbel, Johann Christoph Bach and Johann Michael Bach by Cantus Cölln, with one voice on a part, conducted by Konrad Junghänel. Robert King wrote an arrangement for four voices, a brass quartet of two trumpets and two trombones and organ.
