= Drese =

Drese is a surname. Notable people with the surname include:

- Adam Drese (1620–1701), German composer, kapellmeister and bass viol player of the baroque period
- Claus Helmut Drese (1922–2011), German opera and theatre administrator and author
- Johann Samuel Drese (c. 1644–1716), German composer and member of the musical Drese family
- Johann Wilhelm Drese (1677–1745), German composer, son of Samuel Drese
- Ryan Drese (born 1976), American former professional baseball pitcher
- Stefanie Drese (born 1976), German politician
