= Altbachisches Archiv =

Collection of vocal music, mostly written by.the Bach family

Altbachisches Archiv, also Alt-Bachische Archiv (ABA, old-Bachian archive), is a collection of 17th-century vocal music, most of which was written by members of the Bach family.

== History ==
Johann Ambrosius Bach, Johann Sebastian's father, supposedly started to collect compositions by his relatives. Johann Sebastian Bach's obituary starts with an overview of the composers whose works are contained in the Altbachisches Archiv. Carl Philipp Emanuel Bach, Johann Sebastian's son and co-author of his obituary, retained the collection and gave it its name. After his death the largest part of the collection came, via Georg Pölchau, in the possession of the Sing-Akademie zu Berlin. All nine motets of the Sing-Akademie's part of the ABA collection, including BWV 1164, at the time attributed to Johann Christoph Bach, were published in the early 1820s.

The manuscripts of two compositions contained in the Sing-Akademie's part of the ABA collection were sold to the Royal Library in Berlin (later renamed as Berlin State Library): thus BNB I/B/11 and BWV 1164 were no longer in the Sing-Akademie's archives by the end of the 19th century. In 1935 Max Schneider, recovering ABA manuscripts scattered in the Sing-Akademie's archive, published a selection of these compositions, an edition which was reprinted in 1966. ABA numbers derive from this publication in two volumes. The original manuscripts of the Sing-Akademie's archive went lost during the Second World War, only to be rediscovered in Ukraine in 1999, after which they were returned to the Sing-Akademie, which in turn deposited the recovered manuscripts in the Berlin State Library for conservation.

== Compositions ==
Altbachisches Archiv
ABA	BNB	Composer	Composition	Genre	Scoring	BD
I, 1	I/An/11	Johannes Bach (Johann Michael Bach?)	Sei nun wieder zufrieden	motet (aria)	SSAT+ATTB Bc	8736
I, 2	I/B/43	Johannes Bach (Johann Michael Bach?)	Unser Leben ist ein Schatten	motet	SSATTB+ATB	8740
I, 3	I/An/12	Johannes Bach	Weint nicht um meinen Tod	motet (aria)	SATB	8741
I, 4	—	Johann Michael Bach?	Unser Leben währet siebenzig Jahr	motet	SATT Bc	8743
I, 5	I/B/39	Johann Michael Bach	Das Blut Jesu Christi	motet	SATTB Cnt 3Tbn Bc	8744
I, 6	I/B/40	Johann Michael Bach	Herr, wenn ich nur dich habe	Geistliches Konzert (funeral motet, 14 November 1690)	SATTB	8745
I, 7	I/B/41	Johann Michael Bach	Ich weiß, dass mein Erlöser lebt	Geistliches Konzert	SATTB Bc	8748
I, 8	—	Johann Michael Bach	Sei lieber Tag willkommen	motet	SSATTB Bc	8749
I, 9	I/B/42	Johann Michael Bach	Nun hab' ich überwunden	motet	SATB+SATB Bc	8750
I, 10	—	Johann Michael Bach	Halt, was du hast	motet	SATB+ATTB Bc	8864
I, 11	—	Johann Michael Bach	Fürchtet euch nicht	motet	SATB+SATB Bc	8752
I, 12	—	Johann Michael Bach	Herr, du lässest mich erfahren	motet	SATB+ATTB Bc	8756
I, 13	—	Johann Michael Bach	Dem Menschen ist gesetzt einmal zu sterben	motet	SATB+ATTB Bc	8757
I, 14	—	Johann Michael Bach	Herr, ich warte auf dein Heil	motet	SATB+SATB Bc	8758
I, 15	I/An/10	Adam Drese (not Heinrich Bach)	Nun ist alles überwunden	motet (aria)	SATB	9090
I, 16	I/B/12	Johann Christoph Bach	Es ist nun aus mit meinem Leben	motet (aria)	SATB Bc	8760
I, 17	I/B/16	Johann Christoph Bach	Mit Weinen hebt sichs an	motet	SATB Bc	8762
I, 18	—	Johann Christoph Bach	Der Mensch, vom Weibe geboren	motet	SSATB Bc	8763
I, 19	—	Johann Christoph Bach	Sei getreu bis in den Tod	motet	SSATB Bc	8764
I, 20	I/B/10	Johann Christoph Bach	Der Gerechte, ob er gleich	motet (funeral, 1675)	SATTB Bc	8850
II, 1	—	Heinrich Bach	Ich danke dir, Gott	church cantata (Trinity XVII)	SSATB+SSATB 2Vl 2Va Bc	8787
II, 2	I/B/3	Georg Christoph Bach	Siehe, wie fein und lieblich ist (after Ps. 133)	church cantata / vocal concerto (birthday), 6 September 1689)	ttb Vl 3Vdg Vne Org	8789
II, 3	—	Johann Michael Bach	Es ist ein großer Gewinn	church cantata (unknown occ.)	s Vlp 3Vl Bc	8792
II, 4	I/B/37	Johann Michael Bach	Ach, wie sehnlich wart' ich der Zeit	church cantata (unknown occ.)	s 5Str Org	8794
II, 5	I/B/38	Johann Michael Bach	Auf, lasst uns den Herren loben	church cantata / Aria (unknown occ.)	a 4Str Bc (Vne, Org)	8796
II, 6	—	Johann Michael Bach	Liebster Jesu, hör mein Flehen	church cantata (Reminiscere)	SATTB 2Vl 2Va Bc	8798
II, 7	—	Johann Michael Bach	Ach bleib bei uns, Herr Jesu Christ	church cantata (unknown occ.)	SATB 2Vl 3Va Bc	8800
II, 8	I/An/9	Johann Michael Bach (old attribution: Johann Christoph Bach)	Die Furcht des Herren	church cantata (new council)	ssatbSATB 2Vl 2Va Bc	8802
II, 9	I/B/15	Johann Christoph Bach	Meine Freundin, du bist schön	church cantata (wedding)	satbSATB Vl 3Va Bc	8804
deest	I/B/9	Johann Christoph Bach?	Ach, dass ich Wassers genug hätte	church cantata / lamento (unknown occ.)	a Vl 3Vdg Bc	9088
deest	I/B/11	Johann Christoph Bach	Es erhub sich ein Streit	Geistliches Konzert	satbbSATTB 4Tr Tmp Bss 2Vl 4Va Bc	8956
deest	I/B/13	Johann Christoph Bach	Herr, nun lässest du deinen Diener in Frieden fahren	motet	SATB+SATB Bc	11049
deest	I/B/14	Johann Christoph Bach	Lieber Herre Gott, wecke uns auf	motet	SATB+SATB Wws Strs Bc	9092
deest	I/B/17	Johann Christoph Bach	Unsers Herzens Freude hat ein Ende	motet	SATB+SATB Bc	9119
deest	—	Johann Sebastian Bach (Johann Christoph Bach?)	Ich lasse dich nicht, du segnest mich denn (BWV 1164 = BWV Anh. 159)	motet	SATB+SATB	1470
deest	—	Johann Christoph Bach	Fürchte dich nicht	motet	SATTB Bc	9850
