= Komm, du süße Todesstunde, BWV 161 =

Church cantata by Johann Sebastian Bach

Komm, du süße Todesstunde
- BWV 161
- Church cantata by Johann Sebastian Bach
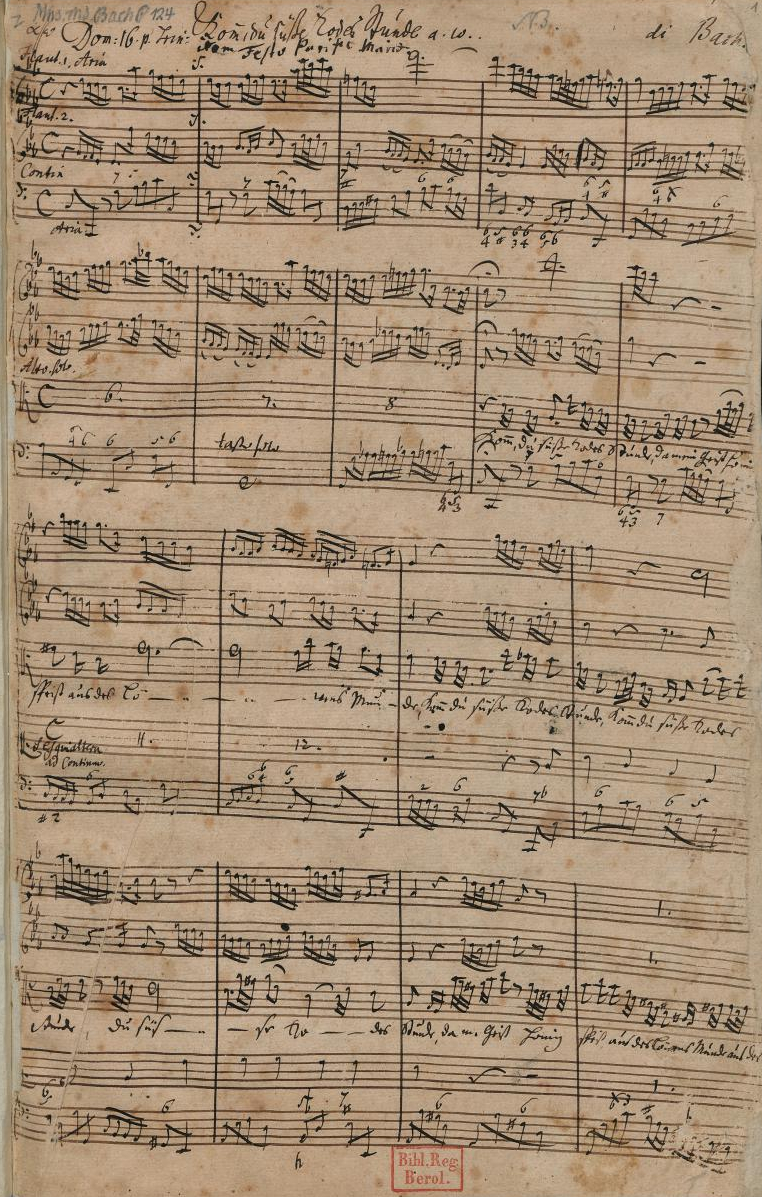
- Manuscript of BWV 161 with subheading and dynamical markings added by Bach
- Occasion: 16th Sunday after Trinity; Purification
- Cantata text: Salomon Franck
- Chorale: "Herzlich tut mich verlangen" by Christoph Knoll
- Performed: 27 September 1716: Weimar
- Movements: 6
- Vocal: alto and tenor soloists; SATB choir
- Instrumental: 2 recorders; 2 violins; viola; continuo

Johann Sebastian Bach composed the church cantata Komm, du süße Todesstunde (Come, you sweet hour of death), BWV 161, in Weimar for the 16th Sunday after Trinity, probably first performed on 27 September 1716.

Bach had taken up regular cantata composition two years before when he was promoted to concertmaster at the Weimar court, writing one cantata per month to be performed in the Schlosskirche, the court chapel in the ducal Schloss. The text of Komm, du süße Todesstunde, and of most other cantatas written in Weimar, was provided by court poet Salomon Franck. He based it on the prescribed gospel reading about the young man from Nain. His text reflects on longing for death, seen as a transition to a life united with Jesus. The text includes as a closing chorale the fourth stanza of the hymn "Herzlich tut mich verlangen" by Christoph Knoll.

The cantata in six movements opens with a sequence of alternating arias and recitatives leading to a chorus and a concluding chorale. The chorale tune, known as "O Haupt voll Blut und Wunden", appears in the first movement, played by the organ, and musical motifs of the arias are derived from it, providing an overall formal unity to the composition. Bach scored the work for two vocal parts (alto and tenor), a four-part choir, and a Baroque chamber ensemble of recorders, strings and continuo. In the alto recitative (movement 4), accompanied by all instruments, Bach creates the images of sleep, of waking up, and of funeral bells, the latter in the recorders and pizzicato of the strings. Bach expanded the final measures of the recitative ("so schlage doch") to a full length aria for tenor (Ach, schlage doch bald, selge Stunde) in the cantata Christus, der ist mein Leben, BWV 95, which he composed in 1723 in Leipzig.

While the libretto was published in a collection in 1715, Bach probably did not perform it until 27 September 1716, due to a period of public mourning of six months in the Duchy of Weimar from August 1715. Bach revived the cantata when he was Thomaskantor in Leipzig, but not for his cantata cycles, which included three new works for the 16th Sunday after Trinity. He performed Komm, du süße Todesstunde with minor changes between 1737 and 1746. He also assigned it to the occasion of Purification, a feast with a similar topic.

== Background ==
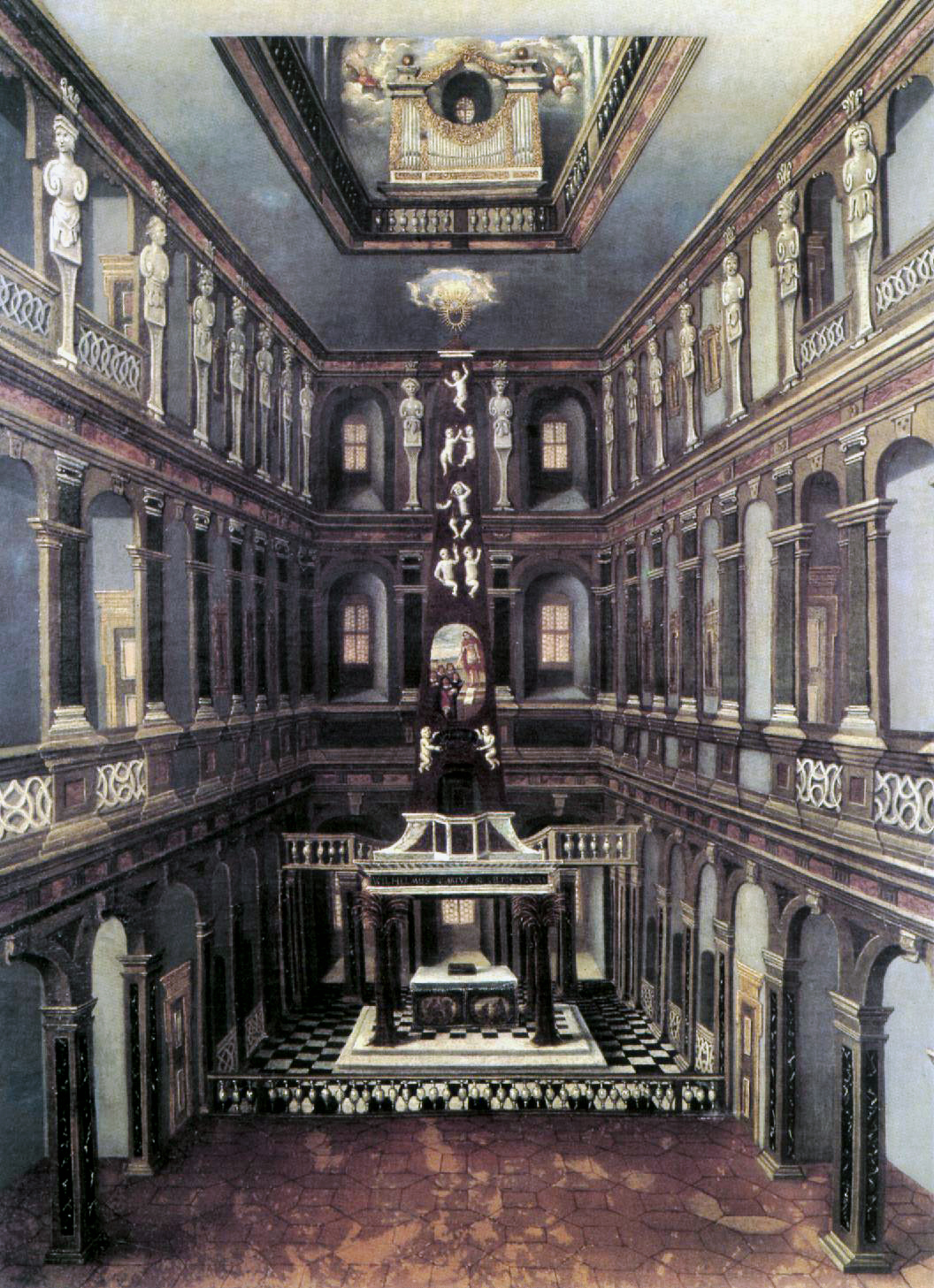
Schlosskirche Weimar

Born in 1685, Bach established his reputation as an outstanding organist while in his teens. He moved to Weimar in 1708 to take up a position as court organist to the co-reigning dukes Wilhelm Ernst and Ernst August of Saxe-Weimar. He had already begun to compose cantatas at his previous posts at Arnstadt and Mühlhausen, and his reasons for moving included disappointment with the standard of singing at the churches where he had worked. He was appointed concertmaster of the Weimar court capelle on 2 March 1714. In that position, he assumed principal responsibility for composing new works. Specifically, he was tasked with providing cantatas for the Schlosskirche (palace church) on a monthly schedule, which would result in a complete annual cycle for the liturgical year within four years. While Bach had composed vocal music only for special occasions until his promotion, the chance to regularly compose and perform a new work resulted in a program into which Bach "threw himself wholeheartedly", as the Bach scholar Christoph Wolff notes.

=== Cantatas of 1716 ===
The cantatas which were probably first performed in 1716 used texts by the Weimar court poet Salomon Franck, published in his collections Evangelisches Andachts-Opffer (1715) and Evangelische Sonn- und Festtages-Andachten (1717). Fewer cantatas have survived from this period than from the years before; possibly some were lost, and possibly some proposed cantatas were never written, reflecting Bach's loss of interest.

From the start of the liturgical year on the first Sunday in Advent, Bach composed prolifically. He wrote works for three consecutive Sundays in Advent, prompted probably by the death of the Kapellmeister Johann Samuel Drese on 1 December 1716. When Bach's hope to become Drese's successor was not realized, he ceased to compose cantatas for the Weimar court.

These works were performed by Bach as concertmaster in 1716, according to Wolff and Alfred Dürr, an authority on Bach's cantatas:

Bach's cantatas in 1716
Date	Occasion	BWV	Incipit	Text source
19 Jan 1716	2nd Sunday after Epiphany	155	Mein Gott, wie lang, ach lange	Franck 1715
27 Sep 1716	16th Sunday after Trinity	161	Komm, du süße Todesstunde	Franck 1715
25 Oct 1716	20th Sunday after Trinity	162	Ach! ich sehe, itzt, da ich zur Hochzeit gehe	Franck 1715
6 Dec 1716	2nd Sunday in Advent	70a	Wachet! betet! betet! wachet!	Franck 1717
13 Dec 1716	3rd Sunday in Advent	186a	Ärgre dich, o Seele, nicht	Franck 1717
20 Dec 1716?	4th Sunday in Advent	147a	Herz und Mund und Tat und Leben	Franck 1717

== Readings and text ==
Bach wrote Komm, du süße Todesstunde for the 16th Sunday after Trinity. The prescribed readings for that Sunday were from the Epistle to the Ephesians, about the strengthening of faith in the congregation of Ephesus (Ephesians 3:13–21), and from the Gospel of Luke, about the raising from the dead of the young man from Nain (Luke 7:11–17). In Bach's time the story pointed at the resurrection of the dead, expressed in words of desire to die soon.

Franck's text was published in Evangelisches Andachts-Opffer in 1715. He included as the closing chorale the fourth stanza of the hymn "Herzlich tut mich verlangen" (1611) by Christoph Knoll. Franck wrote a libretto full of biblical references, including (in the first movement) "feeding on honey from the lion's mouth", based on Judges 14:5–9. Dürr summarizes that Franck wrote "a deeply felt, personal confession of longing for Jesus". The Bach scholar Richard D. P. Jones notes that the cantata is "one of the most richly inspired of all Bach's Weimar cantatas", and sees the text as a part of the inspiration, with its "mystical longing for union with Christ".

== Performances ==
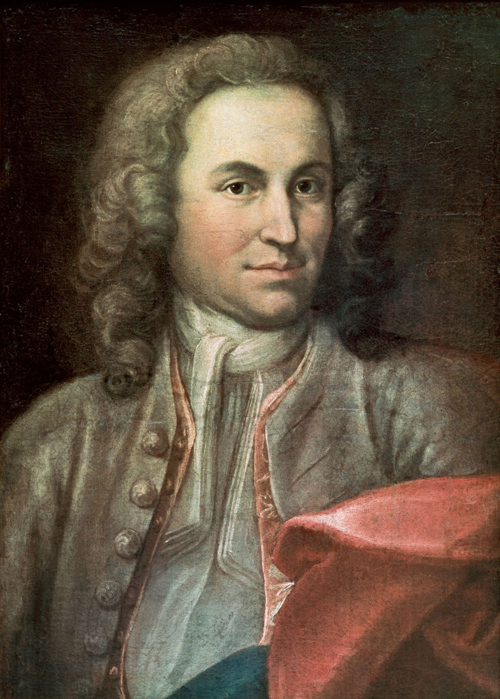
Portrait of the young Bach (disputed)

Bach led the first performance, but its date has been debated. Dürr concluded initially (in the first edition of his book Die Kantaten von Johann Sebastian Bach of 1971) that the cantata was first performed on 6 October 1715, but this date fell in a period of public mourning in Weimar. In August 1715 the brother of Duke Ernst August died, only 18 years old, and the duke proclaimed six months of mourning in the Duchy of Weimar. Cantata performances were resumed sooner, with the 21st Sunday after Trinity on 10 November 1715. Now, the first performance of the work is generally accepted as the same occasion the following year, when the 16th Sunday after Trinity fell on 27 September 1716, by Wolff, the publisher Carus-Verlag, and Dürr in the revised and translated edition of 2006. Richard D. P. Jones notes in his book The Creative Development of Johann Sebastian Bach that "technical novelties" also suggest that the cantata was composed in 1716, according to a recent study.

In 1723, his first year as Thomaskantor in Leipzig, Bach composed a new cantata for the 16th Sunday after Trinity, Christus, der ist mein Leben, BWV 95. A year later he wrote a chorale cantata for his second cantata cycle, Liebster Gott, wenn werd ich sterben? BWV 8, and for his third cantata cycle there he composed Wer weiß, wie nahe mir mein Ende? BWV 27. He revived Komm, du süße Todesstunde in Leipzig, but only later, in a version dated sometime between 1737 and 1746, with minor changes to the scoring. He even performed it for a different liturgical occasion, the feast of the Purification of Mary on 2 February. The prescribed readings for the Purification included Simeon's canticle Nunc dimittis (Luke 2:22–32), which with its line "now lettest thou thy servant depart in peace" has a similar theme.

== Music ==
=== Structure and scoring ===
The cantata is structured in six movements: a series of alternating arias and recitatives leads to a chorus and a concluding chorale. As with several other cantatas based on words by Franck, it is scored for a small ensemble: alto soloist (A), tenor soloist (T), a four-part choir and a Baroque chamber ensemble of two recorders (Fl), two violins (Vl), viola (Va), organ (Org) and basso continuo (Bc). The title page reads simply: "Auf den sechzenden Sontag nach Trintatis" (For the sixteenth Sunday after Trinity). The duration is given as 19 minutes.

One structural element is the anticipation of the closing chorale in the first movement, where the chorale melody is used as a cantus firmus. Bach also used this approach to unify the structure in two other Weimar cantatas, Alles, was von Gott geboren, BWV 80a, and Barmherziges Herze der ewigen Liebe, BWV 185. He later used the juxtaposition of a chorale cantus firmus against vocal music on a grand scale in his St Matthew Passion, in both the opening chorus and the movement concluding Part I. The use of recorders in Komm, du süße Todesstunde is reminiscent of the early cantata Actus tragicus, Gottes Zeit ist die allerbeste Zeit, BWV 106.

At the Leipzig performances of the cantata, the first verse of the chorale was probably sung by a soprano, instead of using an instrumental rendition of the chorale tune in the first aria. The cantata was transposed from C major to E-flat major at Leipzig, where the recorders may have been replaced by transverse flutes.

In the following table of the movements, the scoring and keys are given for the version performed in Weimar in 1716. The keys and time signatures are taken from Dürr, using the C symbol for common time (4/4). The instruments are shown separately for winds and strings, while the continuo, playing throughout, is not shown.

Movements of Komm, du süße Todesstunde, BWV 161
No.	Title	Text	Type	Vocal	Winds	Strings	Other	Key	Time
1	Komm, du süße Todesstunde	Franck	Aria	A	2Fl		Org	C major	common time
2	Welt, deine Lust ist Last	Franck	Recitative	T					3/4
3	Mein Verlangen ist, den Heiland zu umfangen	Franck	Aria	T		2Vl Va		A minor	common time
4	Der Schluß ist schon gemacht	Franck	Recitative	A	2Fl	2Vl Va			common time
5	Wenn es meines Gottes Wille	Franck	Chorus	SATB	2Fl	2Vl Va		C major	3/8
6	Der Leib zwar in der Erden	Knoll	Chorale	SATB	2Fl (obbl.)	2Vl Va		A minor	common time

=== Movements ===
A Phrygian chorale melody, well known as the melody of "O Haupt voll Blut und Wunden", provides the musical theme of the cantata, appearing in movement one in both its original form and the alto line derived from it. The themes of the two other arias are taken from the same melody, providing formal unity. The same melody appears five times in chorales of Bach's St Matthew Passion.

==== 1 ====
The opening aria for alto, "Komm, du süße Todesstunde" ("Come, o sweet hour of death" or "Come, thou sweet hour of parting") is accompanied by the recorders. They move in the ritornello in parallel thirds and sixths. The organ serves not only as a bass instrument but supplies the chorale melody. In Weimar, Bach seems to have expected the congregation to know the words of the first stanza of Knoll's hymn.

Herzlich tut mich verlangen
Nach einem selgen End,
Weil ich hie bin umfangen
Mit Trübsal und Elend.
Ich hab Lust abzuscheiden
Von dieser bösen Welt,
Sehn mich nach himml'schen Freuden,
O Jesu, komm nur bald!

I yearn from my heart
for a peaceful end,
since here I am surrounded
by sorrow and wretchedness.
I wish to depart
from this evil world,
I long for heavenly joys,
O Jesus, come quickly!

Jones points out that the cantus firmus of the organ seems "objective", in contrast to the subjective "display of personal feeling" of the voice and the complexity of the other parts.

In a later performance in Leipzig, a soprano sang the stanza with the organ.

==== 2 ====
The tenor recitative, "Welt, deine Lust ist Last" (World, your pleasure is a burden), begins as a secco recitative, but ends in an arioso as the words paraphrase a biblical verse from Philippians 1:23, "Ich habe Lust abzuscheiden und bei Christo zu sein" to "Ich habe Lust, bei Christo bald zu weiden. Ich habe Lust, von dieser Welt zu scheiden" (I desire to pasture soon with Christ. I desire to depart from this world). Dürr notes that the development from secco to arioso is frequent in Bach's early cantatas, and is here especially motivated to highlight the biblical paraphrase.

==== 3 ====
The aria for tenor, "Mein Verlangen ist, den Heiland zu umfangen" (My longing is, to embrace my Savior), is the first movement with the strings, adding depth to the emotional expression. It returns to the hope for union with Jesus of the first movement, expressed in an agitated way, with syncopies for "longing" and flowing motifs for "embracing". The middle section is mostly accompanied by the continuo only, but at times interjected by the strings playing the "longing"-motifs.

==== 4 ====
The alto recitative, "Der Schluß ist schon gemacht" (The end has already come), is accompanied by all instruments, creating images of sleep (in a downward movement, ending in long notes), awakening (in fast movement upwards), and funeral bells in the recorders and pizzicato of the strings. The musicologist Tadashi Isoyama notes: "In this movement the anticipation of death appears to be fulfilled, and the alto's declamation, welcoming death and the ringing of the funeral bells, is filled with a pathos amounting almost to obsession."

==== 5 ====
The first choral movement 5,"Wenn es meines Gottes Wille" (If it is my God's will), is marked aria by Franck. Bach set it for four parts, using song-like homophony. Wolff compares the style to Thuringian motets of around 1700. The first part is not repeated da capo, in keeping with the last words "Dieses sei mein letztes Wort" (May this be my last word). While a textual da capo is impossible, Bach composed a musical da capo, giving the movement a structure of ABB'A'. Dürr notes that Arnold Schering "has drawn attention to the increasing rapture".

==== 6 ====
The closing chorale, "Der Leib zwar in der Erden" (The body, indeed, in the earth), is illuminated by a fifth part of the two recorders playing a lively counterpoint in unison.

Der Leib zwar in der Erden
Von Würmen wird verzehrt,
Doch auferweckt soll werden,
Durch Christum schön verklärt,
Wird leuchten als die Sonne
Und leben ohne Not
In himml'scher Freud und Wonne.
Was schadt mir denn der Tod?

The body, indeed, in the earth
will be consumed by worms,
yet it shall be resurrected,
beautifully transfigured through Christ,
it will shine like the sun
and live without grief
in heavenly joy and delight.
What harm can death do me then?

The "soaring descant" of the recorders has been interpreted as "creating the image of the flesh transfigured".

=== Summary ===
Wolff summarizes: "Cantata 161 is one of the most delicate and jewel-like products of Bach's years in Weimar. The writing in up to ten parts is extraordinarily subtle. ... The recorders additionally contribute in no small way to the spiritualised emotion and positive feelings associated with the 'sweet hour of death'". Jones writes: "Bach's arrival at full maturity by about the middle of his Weimar period (1713–17) is attested by the stylistic and technical assurance, and the consistently high standard, of his writing at that time." He counts the cantata as one of several that reached a level of mastery unsurpassed in later years, along with the Orgelbüchlein and the cantata Ich hatte viel Bekümmernis, BWV 21, among others.

== Publication ==
The cantata was edited by Franz Wüllner for the Bach Gesellschaft Ausgabe, the first complete edition of Bach's works, in a volume published in 1887. The New Bach Edition (Neue Bach-Ausgabe, NBA) published the score of both the Weimar and the Leipzig version in 1982, edited by Helmuth Osthoff, with the critical commentary following in 1984.

== Later performances ==
John Eliot Gardiner performed the cantata twice in the Bach year 2000 as part of the Bach Cantata Pilgrimage with the Monteverdi Choir. One performance was on the anniversary of Bach's death, 28 July, at Iona Abbey, and the other on the 16th Sunday after Trinity (8 October) at the church of the Convent of San Domingos de Bonaval in Santiago de Compostela.

== Recordings ==
The table entries are excerpted from the selection on the Bach-Cantatas website. Choirs with one voice per part (OVPP) and ensembles playing on period instruments in historically informed performances are marked by green background.

Recordings of Komm, du süße Todesstunde, BWV 161
Title	Conductor / Choir / Orchestra	Soloists	Label	Year	Choir type	Orch. type
J. S. Bach: Cantatas BWV 52 & BWV 161	Felix Prohaska Choir of the Bach Guild Orchestra of the Bach Guild	Hilde Rössel-Majdan; Waldemar Kmentt	Bach Guild	1952		
J. S. Bach: Cantatas BWV 52 & BWV 161	Heinz Markus Göttsche Mannheim Bach Choir Heidelberger Kammerorchester	Sabine Kirchner; Theophil Maier	Oryx Recordings	1964		
J. S. Bach: Kantaten · Cantatas Nr. 89, Nr. 90, Nr. 161	Jaap Schröder Monteverdi-Chor Concerto Amsterdam	Helen Watts; Kurt Equiluz	Telefunken	1965		
Die Bach Kantate Vol. 50	Helmuth Rilling Frankfurter Kantorei Bach-Collegium Stuttgart	Hildegard Laurich; Adalbert Kraus	Hänssler	1976		
J. S. Bach: Das Kantatenwerk – Sacred Cantatas Vol. 8	Gustav Leonhardt Tölzer Knabenchor Concentus Musicus Wien	Paul Esswood; Kurt Equiluz	Teldec	1986		Period
J. S. Bach: Complete Cantatas Vol. 3	Ton Koopman Amsterdam Baroque Orchestra & Choir	Elisabeth von Magnus; Paul Agnew	Antoine Marchand	1995		Period
J. S. Bach: Cantatas Vol. 5 – BWV 18, 143, 152, 155, 161	Masaaki Suzuki Bach Collegium Japan	Yoshikazu Mera; Makoto Sakurada	BIS	1997		Period
Bach Cantatas Vol. 28: Altenburg/Warwick	John Eliot Gardiner Monteverdi Choir English Baroque Soloists	Robin Tyson; Mark Padmore	Soli Deo Gloria	2000		Period
J. S. Bach: Funeral Cantatas	Philippe Pierlot Ricercar Consort	Katharine Fuge; Carlos Mena; Julian Podger; Stephan MacLeod	Rapidshare	2009	OVPP	Period
J. S. Bach: Kantate BWV 161 "Komm, du süsse Todesstunde"	Rudolf Lutz Chor der J. S. Bach-Stiftung Orchester der J. S. Bach-Stiftung	Alex Potter; Daniel Johannsen	Gallus Media	2009		Period

== Bibliography ==
General

- Komm, du süsse Todesstunde, BWV 161: Scores at the International Music Score Library Project
- "Komm, du süße Todesstunde (1st version) BWV 161; BC A 135a / Sacred cantata (16th Sunday after Trinity)". Bach Digital, managed by Bach Archive, SLUB, SBB and Leipzig University. 2016.
- "Komm, du süße Todesstunde (2nd version) BWV 161; BC A 135b / Sacred cantata (16th Sunday after Trinity)". Bach Digital. 2016.

Books

- Dürr, Alfred (1971). Die Kantaten von Johann Sebastian Bach (in German) (4 ed.). Deutscher Taschenbuchverlag. ISBN 978-3-423-04080-8.
- Dürr, Alfred (2006). The Cantatas of J. S. Bach: With Their Librettos in German-English Parallel Text. Translated by Richard D. P. Jones. Oxford University Press. ISBN 978-0-19-929776-4.
- Jones, Richard D. P. (2007). The Creative Development of Johann Sebastian Bach, Volume I: 1695–1717: Music to Delight the Spirit. Oxford University Press. ISBN 978-0-19-816440-1.
- Wolff, Christoph (2002). Johann Sebastian Bach: The Learned Musician. Oxford University Press. ISBN 978-0-393-32256-9.

Online sources

The complete recordings of Bach's cantatas are accompanied by liner notes from musicians and musicologists; Gardiner commented on his Bach Cantata Pilgrimage, Isoyama wrote for Masaaki Suzuki, and Wolff for Ton Koopman.

- Bischof, Walter F. (2010). "Komm, du süße Todesstunde". University of Alberta.
- Dellal, Pamela (2012). "BWV 161 – Komm, du süße Todesstunde". Emmanuel Music.
- Gardiner, John Eliot (2006). Johann Sebastian Bach (1685-1750) / Cantatas Nos 8, 27, 51, 95, 99, 100, 138 & 161 (Media notes). Soli Deo Gloria (at Hyperion Records website).
- Isoyama, Tadashi (1997). "BWV 161: Komm, du süße Todesstunde (Come, thou sweet death's hour)" (PDF). Bach-Cantatas.
- Oron, Aryeh (2015). "Cantata BWV 161 Komm, du süße Todesstunde". Bach Cantatas Website.
- Towe, Teri Noel. "The Portrait in Erfurt Alleged to Depict Bach, the Weimar Concertmeister". The Face of Bach. Archived from the original on 16 July 2011 – via npj.com.
- Wolff, Christoph (1995). "Komm, du süße Todesstunde, BWV 161" (PDF). Bach Cantatas Website.
- "Johann Sebastian Bach: Komm, du süße Todesstunde". Carus-Verlag.
- "Cantata BWV 161 Come, thou blessed hour of parting". Breitkopf.
