= Sacred concerto =

17th-century genre of religious music

Sacred concerto (German: geistliches Konzert, plural: geistliche Konzerte, lit. 'spiritual concerto (or: concert)') is a 17th-century genre of sacred music, characterized as settings of religious texts requiring both vocal soloists and obbligato instrumental forces for performance. Starting from Italian models, the genre flourished primarily in Germany. It is a broad term for various genres of chamber concerto for a small number of voices and instruments popular in Germany during the 17th century and prefiguring the late baroque church cantata and solo sacred cantata forms.

== Early Baroque ==
The stylistic roots of the concert lie in early baroque Italian models brought back to German by musicians such as Heinrich Schütz, and popularised by his contemporaries such as Samuel Scheidt. Some of these concerts take an Italianate dialogue or oratorio form, notably the works of Kaspar Förster and the dialogues of Schütz.

== Middle Baroque ==
The next generation of composers working in this form include Johann Schelle, Johann Philipp Förtsch, Sebastian Knüpfer, Dieterich Buxtehude and early members of the Bach family, the works of whom have been partially preserved in the Altbachisches Archiv. Johann Pachelbel is another composer contributing to the genre, for instance his Christ lag in Todesbanden, P 60, for SATB voices, strings, bassoon and continuo.

== Reception ==
Sacred Concerto - A piece of sacred music composed on a text that may be liturgical or non-liturgical (e. g., from the Psalms), which was sung after the Communion Hymn during the communion of the clergy at the Divine Liturgy. Sometimes hymns from other services, e. g., the All-Night Vigil, are sung as Sacred Concertos. German church music of the Baroque era composed after the first half of 17th century was throughout the 20th century hardly ever indicated as sacred concerto or, in German, Geistliches Konzert. Pieces of this genre were mostly qualified as motets or as cantatas, for instance:

- When Max Schneider published a large selection of the Altbachisches Archiv (ABA) in 1935, he ranged the compositions in two volumes, the first of which was called Motetten und Chorlieder (Motets and choral songs), containing, among others, Johann Michael Bach's Herr, wenn ich nur dich habe, ABA I, 6, and Ich weiß, dass mein Erlöser lebt, ABA I, 7. Georg Christoph Bach's Siehe, wie fein und lieblich, ABA II, 2, was included in the second volume, titled Kantaten (Cantatas).

In 21st-century scholarship, the sacred concerto or geistliches Konzert description is used more often to indicate compositions from the late 17th or early 18th century:

- A 2009 catalogue of the archive of the Sing-Akademie zu Berlin describes Johann Michael Bach's ABA I, 6 and I, 7 as Geistliches Konzert, and Georg Christoph Bach's ABA II, 2 as Sacred concerto.
