= Sacred Concert =

A Sacred Concert is a concert of sacred music. The expression may refer to:

- Sacred concerto, after German Geistliches Konzert, 17th-century precursor to the sacred cantata genre
- Oratorio, or similar sacred composition
- Sacred Concert (Ellington), realised by Duke Ellington in 1965, 1968 and 1973
- "A Sacred Concert", short story by Mary Tappan Wright
