= List of compositions by Johann Pachelbel =

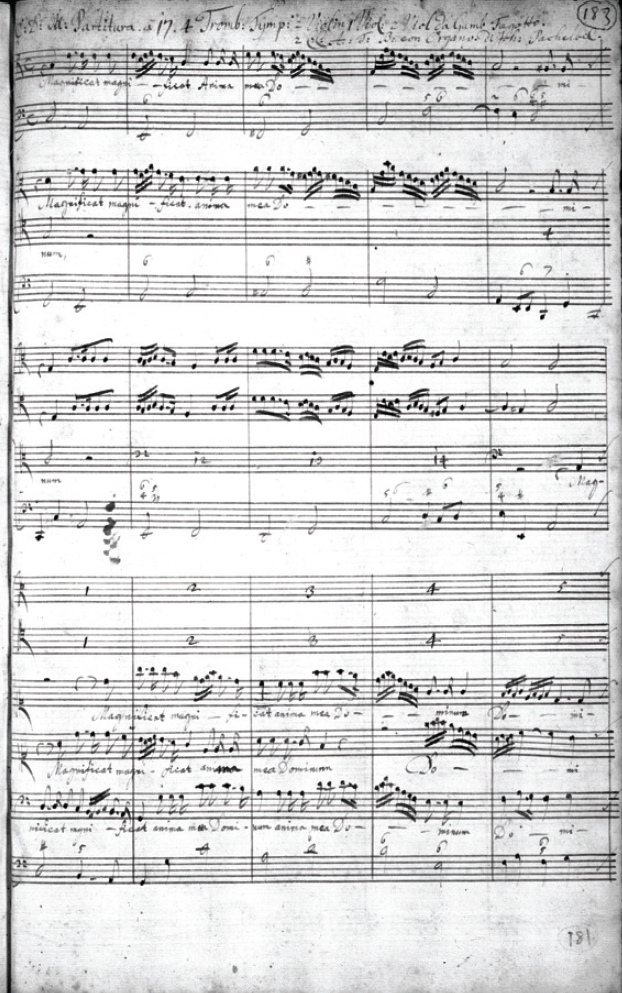
A page from the so-called Tenbury Manuscripts, currently housed at the Bodleian Library. Possibly created by Pachelbel himself, they contain some of his finest late vocal works. They are also among the very few manuscripts ever identified as possible autographs by the composer.

Approximately 530 compositions have been attributed to Johann Pachelbel. As of 2009, no standard numbering system exists for Pachelbel's work. This article presents a thematically organized list and provides catalogue numbers from three different catalogues:

- P = catalogue by Jean M. Perreault, 2001
- T = catalogue by Hideo Tsukamoto, 2002, available online (archive from 18 October 2014)
- PC = catalogue by Kathryn J. Welter, 1998

For organ works, POP catalogue numbers are provided, from catalogue by Antoine Bouchard for his 1998–2001 recording of Pachelbel's organ oeuvre (this catalogue only covers organ works). Perreault numbers are used as the basis of the list, thus organizing individual sections alphabetically (i.e. the chorales) and/or by tonality. Because the Welter catalogue does not provide incipits, many of the works with identical titles will share a single PC number (which is in such cases denoted by a question mark).

The following symbols are used:

- * denotes that the ascription of the piece is questioned
- ! denotes that the composition is, apparently, lost

Similarly to catalogues of works by most early music composers, Pachelbel's list of works remains perpetually incomplete, as new works are often found.

== Organ music ==
=== Chorale preludes ===
Pachelbel composed chorale preludes to the following hymns:

P	T	PC	POP	Composition
Erster Theil etlicher Choräle (Choräle zum praeambuliren) (before 1693)
45	2	1	58	Ich ruf zu dir, Herr Jesu Christ (no. 1)
46	7	2	88	Wie schön leuchtet der Morgenstern (no. 1)
47	4	3	74	Nun lob, mein Seel, den Herren
48	5	4	77	Vater unser im Himmelreich
49	8	5	89	Wir glauben all' an einen Gott
50a	1	6	39	Dies' sind die heil'gen zehn Gebot' (no. 1a)
50b	-	-	-	Dies' sind die heil'gen zehn Gebot' (no. 1b); spurious, arrangement by Johann Gottfried Walther
51	3	7	63	Jesus Christus, unser Heiland, der von uns den Gotteszorn wandt
52	6	8	79	Vom Himmel hoch, da komm ich her (no. 1)
1	9	9	20	Ach Gott, vom Himmel sieh darein (no. 1)
2	10	9?	21	Ach Gott, vom Himmel sieh darein (no. 2)
3	11	10	22	Ach Herr, mich armen Sünder (no. 1)
4	12	11	23	Ach Herr, mich armen Sünder (no. 2)
5*	-	10?	-	Ach Herr, mich armen Sünder (no. 3)
8*	-	-	-	Ach, was soll ich Sünder machen
9*	-	14	-	Ach wir armen Sünder
10*	14	15?	25	Allein Gott in der Höh' sei Ehr' (no. 1) (possibly by Johann Heinrich Buttstett)
11*	15	15?	26	Allein Gott in der Höh' sei Ehr' (no. 2) (possibly by Johann Heinrich Buttstett)
12*	-	15?	-	Allein Gott in der Höh' sei Ehr' (no. 3)
13	16	16?	27	Allein zu dir, Herr Jesu Christ (no. 1)
14	17	16?	28	Allein zu dir, Herr Jesu Christ (no. 2) [alio modo]
15*	-	16?	-	Allein zu dir, Herr Jesu Christ (no. 3)
16*	-	17	-	Als der gütige Gott
17	18	19	29	An Wasserflüssen Babylon (no. 1)
18	19	18/19	30	An Wasserflüssen Babylon (no. 2)
20	-	18	-	An Wasserflüssen Babylon (no. 4)
30*	20	107	31	Auf meinen lieben Gott (no. 1) (possibly by Johann Michael Bach)
31*	-	20	-	Auf meinen lieben Gott (no. 2)
34*	-	21	-	Aus Jakobs Stamm ein Stern sehr klar
35	13	12/13?	24	Aus tiefer Not schrei ich zu dir (no. 1), also known as Ach wie elend ist unsre Zeit
36*	-	22/36?	-	Aus tiefer Not schrei ich zu dir (no. 2)
55*	-	25?	-	Christ, der du bist der helle Tag
58*	22	198	33	Christ lag in Todesbanden (no. 1) (possibly by Johann Sebastian Bach)
59*	-	108	-	Christ lag in Todesbanden (no. 2) (possibly by Heinrich Bach (1615–1692))
59bis*	-	23	-	Christ lag in Todesbanden (no. 3) (possibly by Johann Heinrich Buttstett or Heinrich Bach)
61	23	24	34	Christ unser Herr zum Jordan kam (no. 1)
62*	-	24?	-	Christ unser Herr zum Jordan kam (no. 2)
63*	21	25?	32	Christe, der du bist Tag und Licht (no. 1) (possibly by Johann Sebastian Bach, BWV 1096 is an extended version possibly by Bach)
64*	-	25?	-	Christe, der du bist Tag und Licht (no. 2)
65*	-	27	-	Christe, du Lamm Gottes (no. 1)
66*	-	26	-	Christe, du Lamm Gottes (no. 2)
67*	-	28	-	Christe, wollst uns hören
69*	-	29?	-	Christus, der uns selig macht
69bis*	-	-	-	Christus, der uns selig macht (partita, possibly by Nicolaus Vetter)
70*	24	30	35	Da Jesus an dem Kreuze stund (no. 1) (possibly by Heinrich Bach)
71*	-	109	-	Da Jesus an dem Kreuze stund (no. 2) (possibly by Heinrich Bach, modified and extended version of P.70)
73*	-	31	-	Das alte Jahr vergangen ist
80*	25	32	36	Der Herr ist mein getreuer Hirt (no. 1)
81	26	33	37	Der Herr ist mein getreuer Hirt (no. 2)
82*	-	32?	-	Der Herr ist mein getreuer Hirt (no. 3) (possibly by Johann Peter Heuschkel)
83	-	32?	-	Der Herr ist mein getreuer Hirt (no. 4) (only incipit survives)
85	27	34	38	Der Tag, der ist so freudenreich
50b	-	-	-	Dies' sind die heil'gen zehn Gebot' (no. 1), arrangement of P.50a by Johann Gottfried Walther
101*	-	-	-	Dies' sind die heil'gen zehn Gebot' (no. 2)
103	28	35?	40	Durch Adams Fall ist ganz verderbt (no. 1)
104	29	35?	41	Durch Adams Fall ist ganz verderbt (no. 2)
105	30	36	42	Durch Adams Fall ist ganz verderbt (no. 3)
106	31	37	43	Ein feste Burg ist unser Gott (no. 1)
107	-	-	-	Ein feste Burg ist unser Gott (no. 2)
108*	-	37?	-	Ein feste Burg ist unser Gott (no. 3)
109	32	38	44	Erbarm dich mein, o Herre Gott (no. 1)
110*	-	38?	-	Erbarm dich mein, o Herre Gott (no. 2)
111*	33	39?	45	Erhalt uns, Herr, bei deinem Wort (no. 1) (possibly by Georg Böhm or Dieterich Buxtehude)
112*	-	39?	-	Erhalt uns, Herr, bei deinem Wort (no. 2) (possibly by Georg Böhm or Dieterich Buxtehude)
114*	34	40?	46	Es spricht der Unweisen Mund wohl (no. 1)
115	35	41?	47	Es spricht der Unweisen Mund wohl (no. 2)
116*	-	40?	-	Es spricht der Unweisen Mund wohl (no. 3)
117*	-	42	-	Es stehn vor Gottes Thron
118	36	43?	48	Es woll uns Gott genädig sein (no. 1)
119	37	43?	49	Es woll uns Gott genädig sein (no. 2)
120*	-	43?	-	Es woll uns Gott genädig sein (no. 3)
121*	-	59	-	Esaia, dem Propheten das geschah
166*	38	44?	50	Gelobet seist du, Jesu Christ (no. 1)
167*	-	44?	-	Gelobet seist du, Jesu Christ (no. 2)
169*	-	45	-	Gleich wie ein Hirsch begehret
170*	-	46	-	Gleich wie sich fein ein Vögelein
171	39	47?	51	Gott der Vater wohn uns bei (no. 1)
172*	-	47?	-	Gott der Vater wohn uns bei (no. 2)
174*	40	111	52	Gott hat das Evangelium (possibly by Johann Michael Bach)
178*	41	112	53	Gott Vater, der du deine Sonn' (possibly by Johann Michael Bach)
179*	-	48	-	Gottes Sohn ist kommen
181	42	49?	54	Herr Christ, der einig Gotts Sohn (no. 1) (also known as Herr Christ, Gnadensonne)
182*	-	-	-	Herr Christ, der einig Gotts Sohn (no. 2)
182bis*	-	113?	-	Herr Christ, der einig Gotts Sohn (no. 3) (possibly by Johann Heinrich Buttstett or Christian Friedrich Witt)
183	43	51	55	Herr Gott, dich loben alle wir (no. 1)
184*	-	50	-	Herr Gott, dich loben alle wir (no. 2)
185*	-	-	-	Herr Gott, dich loben wir
186*	-	-	-	Herr Gott nun schleuss den Himmel auf
188*	-	52	-	Herr Jesu Christ, dich zu uns wend
189*	44	114	56	Herr Jesu Christ, ich weiß gar wohl
191*	-	-	-	Herr, wie du willst (opening fughetta lost)
192*	-	53	-	Herzliebster Jesu, was hast du verbrochen
202	45	54/55	57	Ich hab' mein' Sach' Gott heimgestellt (no. 1)
203*	-	55	-	Ich hab' mein' Sach' Gott heimgestellt (no. 2)
205	46	-	59	Ich ruf' zu dir, Herr Jesu Christ (no. 2)
206*	-	56	-	Ich ruf' zu dir, Herr Jesu Christ (no. 3)
209*	47	57?	60	In dich hab ich gehoffet, Herr (no. 1) (possibly by Johann Michael Bach)
210*	-	57?	-	In dich hab ich gehoffet, Herr (no. 2) (possibly by Johann Michael Bach, modified and extended version of P.209)
211*	-	58	-	In dir ist Freude
218*	48	60?	61	Jesus Christus, unser Heiland, der den Tod überwand (no. 1) (possibly by Andreas Armsdorf)
219*	49	60?	62	Jesus Christus, unser Heiland, der den Tod überwand (no. 2)
220*	-	60?	-	Jesus Christus, unser Heiland, der den Tod überwand (no. 3)
222*	-	61	-	Kaiser Augustus leget an
223*	50	116	64	Komm, Gott Schöpfer, Heiliger Geist (no. 1) (possibly by Johann Michael Bach)
225*	51	62	65	Komm, Heiliger Geist, Herre Gott (no. 1) (possibly by Andreas Armsdorf or Johann Gottfried Walther)
226*	-	117	-	Komm, Heiliger Geist, Herre Gott (no. 2) (possibly by Andreas Armsdorf)
227	52	63?	66	Kommt her zu mir, spricht Gottes Sohn (no. 1)
228*	-	63?	-	Kommt her zu mir, spricht Gottes Sohn (no. 2)
231*	-	64	-	Kyrie eleison
232*	-	65	-	Kyrie, Gott, heiliger Geist
233*	-	66	-	Kyrie, Gott Vater in Ewigkeit
235*	-	67	-	Lob sei dem allmächtigen Gott
236	53	68	67	Lob sei Gott in des Himmels Thron (no. 1)
237*	-	68?	-	Lob sei Gott in des Himmels Thron (no. 2)
239*	-	69	-	Lobt Gott, ihr Christen allzugleich
241*	54	70?	68	Mag ich Unglück nicht widerstahn (possibly by Johann Michael Bach)
361*	-	71	-	Mein' Seel', o Gott, muss loben dich
362	55	72/319	69	Meine Seele erhebt den Herren (no. 1) [Magnificat peregrini toni]
363	56	363	70	Meine Seele erhebt den Herren (no. 2) [alio modo]
365*	-	73	-	Meinen Jesum laß ich nicht
369*	-	74	-	Mit Fried und Freud ich fahr dahin
380*	-	75	-	Nun bitten wir den heil'gen Geist (possibly by Johann Heinrich Buttstett)
382*	57	119	71	Nun freut euch, lieben Christen g'mein (no. 1)
383*	-	76	-	Nun freut euch, lieben Christen g'mein (no. 2)
384	-	-	-	Nun freut euch, lieben Christen g'mein (no. 3)
385*	-	77	-	Nun jauchzet, all ihr Frommen
386	58	78	72	Nun komm, der Heiden Heiland (no. 1)
387*	-	78?	-	Nun komm, der Heiden Heiland (no. 2)
388*	59	-	73	Nun lasst uns Gott, dem Herren (no. 1) (possibly by Johann Michael Bach)
389*	-	79/120?	-	Nun lasst uns Gott, dem Herren (no. 2)
393	60	81	75	O Lamm Gottes, unschuldig (no. 1)
394*	-	82	-	O Lamm Gottes, unschuldig (no. 2)
396*	61	83	76	O Mensch, bewein dein Sünde groß (no. 1)
397*	-	83?	-	O Mensch, bewein dein Sünde groß (no. 2)
398*	-	84	-	O Traurigkeit, o Herzeleid
405*	-	-	-	Preis, Lob, und Herrlichkeit
422*	-	85	-	Schaffe in mir, Gott, ein reines Herz
423*	-	86	-	Sei gegrüßet, Jesu gütig
475	62	87	78	Vater unser im Himmelreich (no. 2)
476*	-	-	-	Vater unser im Himmelreich (no. 3)
478	63	88	80	Vom Himmel hoch, da komm ich her (no. 2)
479*	-	88?	-	Vom Himmel hoch, da komm ich her (no. 3)
480*	-	89	-	Vom Himmel kam ein Engelschar
481*	-	90	-	Von Gott will ich nicht lassen
482*	-	91	-	Wär Gott nicht mit uns diese Zeit
483	64	92	81	Warum betrübst du dich, mein Herz (no. 1)
484	65	93	82	Warum betrübst du dich, mein Herz (no. 2)
485*	-	92?	-	Warum betrübst du dich, mein Herz (no. 3)
488	66?	94/121?	83?	Was mein Gott will, das g'scheh allzeit (no. 1)
489	67?	94/121?	84?	Was mein Gott will, das g'scheh allzeit (no. 2)
490*	-	94/121?	-	Was mein Gott will, das g'scheh allzeit (no. 3)
491	68?	95?	85?	Wenn mein Stündlein vorhanden ist (no. 1)
492*	68?	95?	85?	Wenn mein Stündlein vorhanden ist (no. 2)
493*	-	96	-	Wenn meine Sünd' mich kranken
494	70	97?	87	Wenn wir in höchsten Nöten sein (no. 1)
495	69	97?	86	Wenn wir in höchsten Nöten sein (no. 2)
497*	-	98/9?	-	Wer Gott vertraut
498bis*	-	100	-	Werde munter, meine Gemüte
501	-	-	-	Wie schön leuchtet der Morgenstern (no. 2)
502*	-	-	-	Wie schön leuchtet der Morgenstern (no. 3)
502bis*	-	-	-	Wie schön leuchtet der Morgenstern (no. 4) (broadly accepted as being by Johann Sebastian Bach, BWV 739)
503	-	101?	-	Wir danken dir, Herr Jesu Christ (no. 1)
504*	-	101?	-	Wir danken dir, Herr Jesu Christ (no. 2) (apparently lost, only incipit survives)
505*	-	102	-	Wir glauben all' an einen Gott (no. 2)
506*	-	-	-	Wir glauben all' an einen Gott (no. 3)
507	71	103	90	Wo Gott der Herr nicht bei uns hält (no. 1)
508*	72	104?	91	Wo Gott der Herr nicht bei uns hält (no. 2) (possibly by Johann Michael Bach)
509	73	104?	92	Wo Gott der Herr nicht bei uns hält (no. 3)
510*	-	122?	-	Wo Gott der Herr nicht bei uns hält (no. 4)
511	74	-	93	Wo Gott der Herr nicht gibt sein' Gunst (no. 1)
512	75	105	94	Wo Gott der Herr nicht gibt sein' Gunst (no. 2)
513*	-	105?	-	Wo Gott der Herr nicht gibt sein' Gunst (no. 3)
514*	-	106	-	Wo soll ich fliehen hin (possibly by Andreas Armsdorf)

=== Chorale variations ===
P	T	PC	POP	Composition
Musicalische Sterbens-Gedancken (1683)
376	81	123	101	Christus, der ist mein Leben (12 variations)
377a	82	124	102	Alle Menschen müssen sterben (8 variations)
377b	-	-	-	Alle Menschen müssen sterben (5 variations), arrangement by Johann Gottfried Walther
378	83	125	103	Herzlich tut mich verlangen (7 variations)
379	84	126	104	Was Gott tut, das ist wohlgetan (9 variations)
-	-	-	-	Freu dich sehr o meine Seele (12 variations)
7a	85	127	105	Ach, was soll ich Sünder machen [theme and 6 variations]
7b	-	-	-	Ach, was soll ich Sünder machen (arrangement by Johann Gottfried Walther)
129	87	129?	107	Freu dich sehr, o meine Seele
498	86	130	106	Werde munter, mein Gemüte (chorale and 4 partitas)

=== Magnificat fugues ===
P	T	PC	POP	Composition
Magnificat Fugues primi toni (mode I)
257	101	227	151	Magnificat fugue primi toni No. 1 (D minor)
258	102	228	152	Magnificat fugue primi toni No. 2 (D minor)
259	103	229	153	Magnificat fugue primi toni No. 3 (D minor)
260	104	230	154	Magnificat fugue primi toni No. 4 (D minor)
261	105	259	155	Magnificat fugue primi toni No. 5 (D minor)
262	106	260	156	Magnificat fugue primi toni No. 6 (D minor)
263	107	261	157	Magnificat fugue primi toni No. 7 (D minor)
264	108	262	158	Magnificat fugue primi toni No. 8 (D minor)
265	109	-	159	Magnificat fugue primi toni No. 9 (D minor)
266	110	291	160	Magnificat fugue primi toni No. 10 (D minor)
267	111	292	161	Magnificat fugue primi toni No. 11 (D minor)
268	112	293	162	Magnificat fugue primi toni No. 12 (D minor)
269	113	294	163	Magnificat fugue primi toni No. 13 (D minor)
270	114	295	164	Magnificat fugue primi toni No. 14 (D minor)
271	115	296	165	Magnificat fugue primi toni No. 15 (D minor)
272	116	297	166	Magnificat fugue primi toni No. 16 (D minor)
273	117	298	167	Magnificat fugue primi toni No. 17 (D minor)
274	118	299	168	Magnificat fugue primi toni No. 18 (D minor)
275	119	-	169	Magnificat fugue primi toni No. 19 (D minor)
276	120	300	170	Magnificat fugue primi toni No. 20 (D minor)
277	121	-	171	Magnificat fugue primi toni No. 21 (D minor)
278	122	-	172	Magnificat fugue primi toni No. 22 (D minor)
279	123	-	173	Magnificat fugue primi toni No. 23 (D minor)
280	-	325	-	Magnificat fugue primi toni No. 24 (D minor)
281*	-	-	-	Magnificat fugue primi toni No. 25 (D minor)
282	-	-	-	Magnificat fugue primi toni No. 26 (D minor)
283	-	-	-	Magnificat fugue primi toni No. 27 (D minor)
Magnificat Fugues secundi toni (mode II)
284	124	231	174	Magnificat fugue secundi toni No. 1 (G minor)
285	125	232	175	Magnificat fugue secundi toni No. 2 (G minor)
286	126	233	176	Magnificat fugue secundi toni No. 3 (G minor)
287	127	234	177	Magnificat fugue secundi toni No. 4 (G minor)
288	128	263	178	Magnificat fugue secundi toni No. 5 (G minor)
289	129	264	179	Magnificat fugue secundi toni No. 6 (G minor)
290	130	265	180	Magnificat fugue secundi toni No. 7 (G minor)
291	131	266	181	Magnificat fugue secundi toni No. 8 (G minor)
292	132	301	182	Magnificat fugue secundi toni No. 9 (G minor)
293	133	302	183	Magnificat fugue secundi toni No. 10 (G minor)
Magnificat Fugues tertii toni (mode III)
294	134	235	184	Magnificat fugue tertii toni No. 1 (C major)
295	135	236	185	Magnificat fugue tertii toni No. 2 (C major)
296	136	237	186	Magnificat fugue tertii toni No. 3 (C major)
297	137	238	187	Magnificat fugue tertii toni No. 4 (G major)
298	138	267	188	Magnificat fugue tertii toni No. 5 (G major)
299	139	268	189	Magnificat fugue tertii toni No. 6 (G major)
300	140	269	190	Magnificat fugue tertii toni No. 7 (G major)
301	141	270	191	Magnificat fugue tertii toni No. 8 (G major)
302	142	303	192	Magnificat fugue tertii toni No. 9 (C major)
303	143	304	193	Magnificat fugue tertii toni No. 10 (C major)
304	144	305	194	Magnificat fugue tertii toni No. 11 (C major)
305	-	-	-	Magnificat fugue tertii toni No. 12 (G major; only the incipit is preserved; not a fugue)
Magnificat Fugues quarti toni (mode IV)
306	145	239	195	Magnificat fugue quarti toni No. 1 (A minor)
307	146	240	196	Magnificat fugue quarti toni No. 2 (E minor)
308	147	241	197	Magnificat fugue quarti toni No. 3 (A minor)
309	148	242	198	Magnificat fugue quarti toni No. 4 (A minor)
310	149	271	199	Magnificat fugue quarti toni No. 5 (A minor)
311	150	272	200	Magnificat fugue quarti toni No. 6 (A minor)
312	151	273	201	Magnificat fugue quarti toni No. 7 (E minor)
313	152	274	202	Magnificat fugue quarti toni No. 8 (A minor)
Magnificat Fugues quinti toni (mode V)
314	153	243	203	Magnificat fugue quinti toni No. 1 (F major)
315	154	244	204	Magnificat fugue quinti toni No. 2 (F major)
316	155	245	205	Magnificat fugue quinti toni No. 3 (F major)
317	156	246	206	Magnificat fugue quinti toni No. 4 (F major)
318	157	275	207	Magnificat fugue quinti toni No. 5 (F major)
319	158	276	208	Magnificat fugue quinti toni No. 6 (B♭ major)
320	159	277	209	Magnificat fugue quinti toni No. 7 (B♭ major)
321	160	278	210	Magnificat fugue quinti toni No. 8 (F major)
322	161	306	211	Magnificat fugue quinti toni No. 9 (F major)
323	162	307	212	Magnificat fugue quinti toni No. 10 (F major)
324	163	308	213	Magnificat fugue quinti toni No. 11 (F major)
325	164	309	214	Magnificat fugue quinti toni No. 12 (F major)
Magnificat Fugues sexti toni (mode VI)
326	165	247	215	Magnificat fugue sexti toni No. 1 (F major)
327	166	248	216	Magnificat fugue sexti toni No. 2 (F major)
328	167	249	217	Magnificat fugue sexti toni No. 3 (F major)
329	168	250	218	Magnificat fugue sexti toni No. 4 (F major)
330	169	279	219	Magnificat fugue sexti toni No. 5 (F major)
331	170	280	220	Magnificat fugue sexti toni No. 6 (F major)
332	171	310	221	Magnificat fugue sexti toni No. 7 (F major)
333	172	311	222	Magnificat fugue sexti toni No. 8 (F major)
334	173	312	223	Magnificat fugue sexti toni No. 9 (F major)
335	174	313	224	Magnificat fugue sexti toni No. 10 (F major)
Magnificat Fugues septimi toni (mode VII)
336	175	251	225	Magnificat fugue septimi toni No. 1 (C minor)
337	176	252	226	Magnificat fugue septimi toni No. 2 (C minor)
338	177	253	227	Magnificat fugue septimi toni No. 3 (C minor)
339	178	254	228	Magnificat fugue septimi toni No. 4 (C minor)
340	179	283	229	Magnificat fugue septimi toni No. 5 (C minor)
341	180	284	230	Magnificat fugue septimi toni No. 6 (C minor)
342	181	285	231	Magnificat fugue septimi toni No. 7 (C minor)
343	182	286	232	Magnificat fugue septimi toni No. 8 (C minor)
Magnificat Fugues octavi toni (mode VIII)
344	183	255	233	Magnificat fugue octavi toni No. 1 (G major)
345	184	256	234	Magnificat fugue octavi toni No. 2 (G major)
346	185	257	235	Magnificat fugue octavi toni No. 3 (G major)
347	186	258	236	Magnificat fugue octavi toni No. 4 (G major)
348	187	287	237	Magnificat fugue octavi toni No. 5 (G major)
349	188	288	238	Magnificat fugue octavi toni No. 6 (G major)
350	189	289	239	Magnificat fugue octavi toni No. 7 (G major)
351	190	290	240	Magnificat fugue octavi toni No. 8 (G major)
352	191	314	241	Magnificat fugue octavi toni No. 9 (G major)
353	192	315	242	Magnificat fugue octavi toni No. 10 (G major)
354	193	316	243	Magnificat fugue octavi toni No. 11 (G major)
355	194	317	244	Magnificat fugue octavi toni No. 12 (G major)
356	195	318	245	Magnificat fugue octavi toni No. 13 (G major)
-	-	319	-	Magnificat fugue peregrini toni

=== Chaconnes ===
P	T	PC	POP	Composition
38	201	144	11	Chaconne in C major (25 variations)
39	202	146	12	Chaconne in D major (1) (16 variations)
40	203	145	13	Chaconne in D major (2) (13 variations)
41	204	147	14	Chaconne in D minor (16 variations)
42	205	148	15	Chaconne in F major (33 variations)
43	206	149	16	Chaconne in F minor (22 variations)
44*	-	-	-	Chaconne in A minor (incomplete, incipit only)

=== Arias with variations ===
P	T	PC	POP	Composition
Hexachordum Apollinis (1699) (NB: this only incorporates P.193–198)
193	211	131	1	Aria and 6 variations in D minor, Aria prima
194	212	132	2	Aria and 5 variations in E minor, Aria secunda
195	213	133	3	Aria and 6 variations in F major, Aria tertia
196	214	134	4	Aria and 6 variations in G minor, Aria quarta
197	215	135	5	Aria and 6 variations in A minor, Aria quinta
198	216	136	6	Aria and 8 variations in F minor, Aria sexta (Aria Sebaldina)
21*	-	137	-	Aria and 3 variations in C minor (incomplete, aria alone survives)
22	217	138	8	Aria and 6 variations in D major
24*	-	139	-	Aria and 7 variations in G major (incomplete, aria alone survives)
25	218	148	9	Aria and 3 variations in A major
26	219	140?	10	Aria and 4 variations in A minor
27	-	141?	-	Aria and 6 variations in A minor
29	220	143	7	Arietta and 9 variations in F major

=== Preludes ===
P	T	PC	POP	Composition
401*	-	-	-	Preamble in C major
402*	-	-	-	Preamble in E minor
402bis*	-	-	-	Preamble in E minor [no. 2]
403*	-	-	-	Preamble in F major
403bis*	-	-	-	Preamble in F major
404*	-	-	-	Preamble in A minor
406	221	153/154	250	Prelude in D minor (no. 1)
407	222	153	256	Prelude in D minor (no. 2)
408	223	155	251	Prelude in E♭ major
409	224	156/157	252	Prelude in G major
410	225	158	253	Prelude in G minor
411	226	159	254	Prelude in A major
412	227	160	255	Prelude in A minor
412bis*	-	160?	-	Prelude in A minor [no. 2]

==== Preludes and fugues ====
P	T	PC	POP	Composition
413	-	152	-	Prelude and Fugue in C major
414*	-	326	-	Prelude and Fugue in C minor
414bis*	-	-	-	Prelude and Fugue in D major
415	-	-	-	Prelude and Fugue in D minor
416	228	156	-	Prelude and Fugue in E minor (no. 1)
417	-	214 (fugue)	-	Prelude and Fugue in E minor (no. 2) (the prelude is a transposition of P.406)

=== Toccatas ===
P	T	PC	POP	Composition
454	231	162	270	Toccata in C major (no. 1)
455	232	163	273	Toccata in C major (no. 2)
456	233	164	274	Toccata in C major (no. 3)
457	234	165	278	Toccata in C major (no. 4)
458	235	166	285	Toccata in C major (no. 5)
459	236	167	279	Toccata in C minor
460	237	168	272	Toccata in D major (key erroneously listed in PC as D minor)
461	238	169	271	Toccata in D minor
462	240	171	281	Toccata in E minor
463	242	172/173	282	Toccata in F major (no. 1)
464	241	172/173	276	Toccata in F major (no. 2)
464bis*	-	-	-	Toccata in G major (broadly accepted as being by Wilhelm Hieronymus Pachelbel)
465	243	174	277	Toccata in G minor (no. 1)
466	244	175	280	Toccata in G minor (no. 2)
467	245	176	283	Toccata in G minor (no. 3)
468	246	177	284	Toccata in G minor (no. 4)
471	-	-	-	Toccatina in D minor
472	-	-	-	Toccatina in G major
473	-	-	-	Toccatina in G minor

==== Toccatas and fugues ====
P	T	PC	POP	Composition
469	239	170	275	Toccata and Fugue in D minor
470	247	178	286	Toccata and Fugue in B♭ major

=== Fantasias ===
P	T	PC	POP	Composition
123	251	179	110	Fantasia in C major
124	253	181	112	Fantasia in D minor (no. 1)
125	252	180	111	Fantasia in D minor (no. 2)
125bis*	-	-	-	Fantasia in D minor (no. 3)
126	256	184	115	Fantasia in A minor
127	254	182	113	Fantasia in E♭ major
128	255	183	114	Fantasia in G minor
-	-	-	-	Fantasia
-	-	-	-	Fantasia

=== Fugues ===
P	T	PC	POP	Composition
131	261	186	122	Fugue in C major (no. 1)
132	272	-	143	Fugue in C major (no. 2)
133	275	199	144	Fugue in D major (no. 1)
134*	-	-	-	Fugue in D major (no. 2)
135	277	214?	123	Fugue in E minor (no. 1)
136*	-	-	-	Fugue in E minor (no. 2)
137	281	217?	145	Fugue in G major
138*	-	-	-	Fugue in G minor
139	283	222	120	Fugue in A major
140*	-	-	-	Fugue in A minor
141	286	225	121	Fugue in B minor
142	262	188	124	Fugue in C major (no. 3)
143	263	189	125	Fugue in C major (no. 4, bicinium)
144	264	190	126	Fugue in C major (no. 5, bicinium)
145	267	191	129	Fugue in C major (no. 6)
146	268	192	130	Fugue in C major (no. 7)
147	271	193	137	Fugue in C major (no. 8)
148	265	194	127	Fugue in C major (no. 9)
149	266	195	128	Fugue in C major (no. 10)
150	269	196	131	Fugue in C major (no. 11)
151	270	197	132	Fugue in C major (no. 12)
152	273	198	133	Fugue in C minor
153	274	200	134	Fugue in D major (no. 1)
153bis	-	-	-	Fugue in D major (no. 2)
154	276	202	141	Fugue in D minor (no. 1)
155*	-	-	-	Fugue in D minor (no. 2)
155bis	-	-	-	Fugue in D minor (no. 3)
156	278	156	135	Fugue in F major (no. 1)
156bis	-	-	-	Fugue in F major (no. 2)
157*	-	-	-	Fugue in F minor (identical to P.268(1) Magnificat Fugue primi toni No. 12, transposed)
158	279	218	136	Fugue in G major (no. 1)
159	280	219	142	Fugue in G major (no. 2)
160	282	160	138	Fugue in G minor
161	-	220	-	Fugue in A major
162	284	162	139	Fugue in A minor (no. 1)
163	285	224	140	Fugue in A minor (no. 2)

=== Ricercars ===
P	T	PC	POP	Composition
418	291	320/321	261	Ricercare in C major
419	292	322	262	Ricercare in C minor
420*	-	-	-	Ricercare in D major
421	293	320	260	Ricercare in F♯ minor

== Other keyboard music ==
P	T	PC	Composition
164*	-	-	Gavotte in F major
234bis	-	-	Lied in G minor
366	-	-	Minuet in D minor
367*	-	346?	Minuet in G major (no. 1)
368*	-	346?	Minuet in G major (no. 2)
421bis*	-	347	Sarabande in G minor
428*	301	327	Suite in C major (No. 25 in Max Seiffert's catalogue)
429*	302	328	Suite in C minor (incomplete; 2 movements only)
430*	303	329	Suite in C♯ minor
431*	304	330	Suite in D major
432*	305	331	Suite in D minor (No. 26 in Max Seiffert's catalogue)
433*	306	332	Suite in E♭ major
434*	307	333	Suite in E major
435*	308	334	Suite in E minor (no. 1) (No. 28 in Max Seiffert's catalogue)
436	309	335	Suite in E minor (no. 2) (No. 29 in Max Seiffert's catalogue)
437*	311	337a?	Suite in F major (no. 1) (apparently incomplete; 3 movements only; No. 32 in Max Seiffert's catalogue)
438	310	336?	Suite in F major (no. 2)
439*	312	338	Suite in F♯ minor
440*	313?	339?	Suite in G major (no. 1) (No. 34? in Max Seiffert's catalogue)
441*	314?	339?	Suite in G major (no. 2)
442*	315	340a	Suite in G minor (no. 1) (No. 33 in Max Seiffert's catalogue)
443	316	340b	Suite in G minor (no. 2) (No. 33 in Max Seiffert's catalogue)
444	317	341	Suite in A♭ major
445*	318	342	Suite in A major (No. 36 in Max Seiffert's catalogue)
446*	319	343	Suite in A minor
447*	320	344	Suite in B♭ major
448*	321	345	Suite in B minor

== Chamber music ==
P	T	PC	Composition
Musicalische Ergötzung (1691)
370a	331	348	Suite in F major, 2vn, b.c.
371	332	349	Suite in C minor, 2vn, b.c.
372	333	350	Suite in E♭ major, 2vn, b.c.
373	334	351	Suite in E minor, 2vn, b.c.
374	335	352	Suite in C major, 2vn, b.c.
375	336	353	Suite in B♭ major, 2vn, b.c.
28	341	-	Aria with 9 variations in A major, vn, 2vg
37	337	358	Canon and gigue in D major, 3vn, b.c.
427*	-	359	Sonata in G major, vn, k.i.
449	340	354	Suite in F♯ minor, vn, 2va, b.c.
450	339	355b?	Suite in G major (no. 1), vn, 2va, vle (Perrault writes: The lack of figuration for the lower part means that it was not a b.c., so that this work may well count as the first true string quartet, at least within the Germanophone domain.)
451	338	355a?	Suite in G major (no. 2), 2vn, 2va, b.c.
453	-	-	Suite [tonality unspecified], vn, 2va, k.i., (?)b.c.

== Vocal music ==
=== Arias ===
P	T	PC	Composition
32	431	360	Auf, werte Gäst, for soprano or tenor, 2vn, b.c. (1 strophe)
33	432	361	Augen, streuet Perlentränen, for alto, tenor, 4va, "va pro basso" (4 strophes)
57*	-	-	Christ ist erstanden, for soprano, vn, b.c. (possibly by Achilles)
74	433	367	Das angenehmste Wetter, for tenor, 2vn
75	434	368	Das Gewitter for tenor, 2vn, b.c. (6 strophes)
76	435	369	Das Jahr fängt an, for alto, 2vn, 2va, b.c. (4 strophes)
86	436	363	Der Widder Abrahams, for alto, tenor, 2vn, b.c. (5 strophes)
100	437	370	Die freuderfüllten Abendstunden, for soprano, 2vn, 2va, b.c.
113	438	371	Es muss die Sinne ja erfreuen, for tenor, 2vn, b.c. (7 strophes)
165	439	372	Geliebtes Vaterherz, for bass, 2vn, 2va, b.c./vle
180	440	374	Guter Walter unsers Rat, for tenor, 2vn, 2va, b.c.
199	441	375	Hör, grosser Mäcenat, for alto, 2vn, 2va, b.c.
240	442	376	Mäcenas lebet noch, for alto, 2vn, 2va, tr, b.c. (6 strophes)
360	443	363	Mein Leben, dessen Kreuz, for tenor, 2vn, 2va, "va pro basso", org (6 strophes)
379bis*	-	-	Nisi Domin[us] aedificaverit, (?)aria, bass, (?)vn, b.c.
391	444	377	O grosses Musenlicht, for tenor, 2vn, 2vg, b.c.
425	445	378	So ist denn dies der Tag, aria and chorus for soprano, SSATB, 2vn, 3va, 4tr, timp, b.c. (8 strophes)
426	446	379	So ist denn nun die Treu, aria and chorus for 2 sopranos, SSATB, 2fl, 2vn, 3va, b.c. (9 strophes)
476bis	-	-	Verzag [Vergess?] doch nicht, du armer Sünder, for tenor, vn, 4va, b.c.
477	447	364	Voller Wunder, voller Kunst, for soprano, alto, tenor, bass, b.c.
500	448	380	Wie nichtig, ach!, for tenor, 3va, b.c.
515	449	365	Wohl Euch, die ihr in Gott verliebt, for soprano, alto, tenor, bass, b.c.

=== Motets ===
P	T	PC	Composition
77	351	382	Der Herr ist König, darum toben die Völker, SATB, SATB, (?)b.c.
78	352	383?	Der Herr ist König und herrlich geschmückt, SATB, SATB, b.c.
79	353	383?	Der Herr ist König und herrlich geschmückt... Hallelluja, SSATB, b.c.
122	354	388	Exurgat Deus, SATB, SATB, b.c.
175	355	384	Gott ist unser Zuversicht und Stärcke, SATB, SATB, b.c.
213	356	-	Jauchzet dem Herrn, alle Welt, SATB, SATB, b.c.
217	357	-	Jauchzet Gott, alle Lande, SATB, SATB, b.c.
381	358	385	Nun danket alle Gott, SATB, SATB, b.c.
400	359	389	Paratum cor meum, SATB, SATB, b.c.
424	360	386	Singet dem Herrn ein neues Lied, SATB, SATB, b.c.
474	361	387	Tröste, tröste uns, Gott, SATB, SATB, b.c.

=== Sacred concertos ===
P	T	PC	Composition
0*	-	-	Ach Gott, erhör mein Seufzen
60	371	393	Christ lag in Todesbanden, SATB, 2vn, 3va, fg, b.c.
84	372	394	Der Name des Herren sei gelobet, SAB, 2vn, (?)fg, b.c.
173*	-	395	Gott du Gott Israel, SSATB, 2vn, 2va, b.c.
176	373	-	Gott ist unser Zuversicht und Stärcke, SATB, 2vn, 3va, fg, b.c.
177	374	-	Gott sei uns gnädig, SSATB, 5tr, timp, 2vn, 4va, fg, b.c., org.
215	376	395(2)	Jauchzet dem Herrn, alle Welt, in G major, SSATB, 2ob, 2vn, 3va, fg/vle, b.c.
216	375	411	Jauchzet dem Herrn, alle Welt, in D major, SSATB, 4tr, timp, 2vn, 3va, fg, b.c.
230	377	-	Kommt her zu mir, spricht Gottes Sohn, SATB, 2 cornetti/clarini, 2vn, [va], b.c.
238	378	-	Lobet den Herrn in seinem Heiligtum, SSATB, 2fl/2ob, 5tr, tb, timp, cymbal, harp, fg, 2vn, 3va, b.c.(org.)
359	380	396	Mein Herr Jesu, dir leb ich, SATB, 3va, b.c.
359bis*	-	-	Mein Herz ist bereit
364	379	397	Meine Sünden betrüben mich, SATB, ob, 4vg, fg/vle, b.c.
487	381	399	Was Gott tut, das ist wohlgetan, SATB, 2vn, 2va, fg, b.c.

=== Masses ===
P	T	PC	Composition
357	386	408	Mass in C major, SATB, 2clarini, 2vn, b.c.
358	387	407	Mass in D major "Missa Brevis", SATB, b.c.

=== Ingressus ===
P	T	PC	Composition
87	391	421	Deus in adjutorium meum intende, SATB, 2vn, va, b.c., C major (no. 1)
88	392	422	Deus in adjutorium meum intende, SATB, 2vn, 3va, fg, b.c., C major (no. 2)
89	393	423	Deus in adjutorium meum intende, SSATB, 4tr, timp, 2vn, 3va, fg, b.c., org, C major (no. 3)
90	394?	424	Deus in adjutorium meum intende, [SATB((?)solo)], 2vn, va, b.c., D major (no. 1)
91	395?	425	Deus in adjutorium meum intende, SATB, 2vn, 3va, fg, b.c., D major (no. 2)
92	396	426	Deus in adjutorium meum intende, SSATB, 2vn, 3va, b.c., D minor (key erroneously listed in PC as D major)
93	397	427	Deus in adjutorium meum intende, SSATB, 2vn, 4va, fg, b.c., F major
94	398	430	Deus in adjutorium meum intende, SATB, 2vn, 3va (ad lib.), b.c., G major
95	399?	428?	Deus in adjutorium meum intende, SATB, 2vn, fg, b.c., G minor (no. 1)
96	400?	429?	Deus in adjutorium meum intende, SSATB, 2vn, va, 2vg, fg, b.c., G minor (no. 2)
97	401	432	Deus in adjutorium meum intende, SSATB, 2vn, 3va, fg, b.c., A major
98	402	431	Deus in adjutorium meum intende, SSATB, 2vn, 3va, fg, b.c., A minor

=== Magnificats ===
P	T	PC	Composition
242	413	433	Magnificat in C major (no. 1), SATB, 2tr, 2vn, 2va, b.c.
243	411	434	Magnificat in C major (no. 2), SSATB, 2ob, 2vn, 3va, fg, b.c.
244	412?	435?	Magnificat in C major (no. 3), SSATB, 4tr, timp, 2vn, va, 2vg, fg, b.c.
245	414?	436?	Magnificat in C major (no. 4), SSATB, 4tr, timp, 2vn, va, vg, fg, b.c.
246	417	437	Magnificat in D major (no. 1), SATB, 4va (ad libitum), b.c.
247	415	438	Magnificat in D major (no. 2), SSATB, 2cornetti, 2ob, 2vn, 3va, fg, "con Organo"
248	416	439	Magnificat in D major (no. 3), [chor.I]SSATB, 2vn, 3va, fg, b.c., [chor.II]SSATB, 2vn, 3va, fg, b.c.
250	418	440	Magnificat in E♭ major, SATB, 2vn, 3va, fg, b.c., org
251	419	441	Magnificat in F major (no. 1), SATB, 2vn, fg, b.c.
252	420	442	Magnificat in F major (no. 2), SSATB, 2vn, b.c.
253	421	444	Magnificat in G major, SATB, 2vn, b.c.
254	422	443	Magnificat in G minor, SATB, b.c.
255	423	445	Magnificat in B♭ major, SSATB, 2ob, 2vn, 3va, fg, b.c./org

== Lost works ==
=== Chorale preludes ===
P	Composition
2bis*!	Ach Gott, vom Himmel sieh darein (no. 3)
19!	An Wasserflüssen Babylon (no. 3)
68!	Christum wir sollen loben schon
72!	Danket dem Herrn, denn er ist sehr freundlich
168!	Gläubiges Herz, freue, chorale-prelude
207!	Ich weiss dass mein Erlöser lebt
221!	Jesus Christus, unser Heiland, der von uns den Gotteszorn wandt (no. 2)
224!	Komm Gott Schöpfer, heiliger Geist
390!	Nun lob' mein Seel' den Herren
392!	O Herre Gott, dein göttlich Wort
395!	O Lamm Gottes unschuldig (no. 3)
499!	Wie nach einer Wasserquelle

=== Chorale variations ===
P	Composition
217bis!*	Jesu, meine Freude (on Frack's hymn)

=== Chamber music ===
P	Composition
370b!	Suite in D major (first suite of Musicalische Ergötzung transposed from F major)
452!	Suite [2vn, 2va, vc, b.c.], G major (no. 3)
516!	Zwillingspartita, 2vn, D major

=== Vocal music ===
P	Composition
6!	Ach Herr, straff mich nicht, (?)aria, voice, 3 instruments
56!	Christ ist erstanden, (?)aria, voice, "instruments" (no. 1)
102!	Dixit Dominus, (?)motet, "4 vv, 5 insts"
185bis!	Herr Gott, dich loben wir, (?)motet, (?)SATB, SATB
187!	Herr hebe an zu segnen, motet/sacred concerto(?), SSATB, 5va, fg
190!	Herr, wenn deine Wort nicht wäre, (?)motet, "a 5"
200!	Ich bin die Auferstehung, (?)motet
201!	Ich fahr dahin mit Freuden, (?)aria, voice, "5 insts"
204!	Ich kann nicht mehr, (?)aria, "2 vv, 4 insts"
208!*	Ich will den Herrn loben allezeit, (?)motet
212!*	In nomine Jesu, (?)motet
214!	Jauchzet dem Herren, alle Welt, (?)motet, "a 13"
229!	Kommt her zu mir, spricht Gottes Sohn, (?)motet, "a 13"
234!	Laetatus sum, sacred concerto, SSATB, trombetta, 2 cornetti, trombone, 2vn, 2va, fg, org (only instrumental parts survive)
249!	Magnificat, D major (no. 4), "a 13"
256!	Magnificat, [key unknown], "a 13"
486!*	Was Gott tut, das ist wohlgetan, (?)motet, "a 9", SATB, SATB, b.c.
496!	Wenn wir in höchsten Nöten sein, (?)sacred concerto, "a 10. 4 Viol. SATB"

== Miscellany ==
P	Composition	Description
23	[deleted]	
53!–54!	"Zwei Chörichte Sonaten, in specie dessen Serenata"	Sonatas for choir and ensemble ("serenades"?). They were mentioned by Johann Heinrich Buttstett in his 1716 treatise Ut, mi, sol, re, fa, la, tota musica et harmonia aeterna, along with Johann Michael Bach's Revange, as examples of highly refined music. Neither Pachelbel's nor J.M. Bach's works survive.
99	Deutlich Anweisung. Wie man durchs ganze Jahr bey wehrenden Gottesdienst, so wohl in den Vespern als Tagambt, bey S. Sebald m. der Orgel zu intonieren und zu respondiren sich zu verhalten habe.	A set of liturgical instructions for organists of St. Sebaldus Church.
130	Fugen und Praeambuln über die gewöhnlichsten Tonos figuratos	"Fugues and Preludes in all church modes", a collection announced in 1704 book fair catalogues. It was to be published in 1705, however, no trace of it remains. Welter identifies this with a manuscript chorale collection, the so-called Weimar Tabulaturbuch.
399	[deleted]	
