= Singet dem Herrn ein neues Lied (Pachelbel) =

- Motet by Johann Pachelbel
- English: Sing a new song to the Lord
- Catalogue: P. 424
- Text: Psalms 98:1-3, 9
- Language: German
- Duration: 4 min.
- Scoring: 2 SATB choirs; basso continuo

Singet dem Herrn ein neues Lied (Sing a new song to the Lord), P. 424, is a motet for two four-part choirs by Johann Pachelbel, a setting of verses from Psalm 98.

== History and music ==
Pachelbel composed the motet Singet dem Herrn ein neues Lied, setting verses 1 to 3 and 9 from Psalm 98 in the translation into German by Martin Luther. He scored it for a double chorus and basso continuo. The two choirs are used antiphonally.

The motet was recorded in 1994 in a collection of motets by Pachelbel, Johann Christoph Bach and Johann Michael Bach by Cantus Cölln, with one voice on a part, conducted by Konrad Junghänel. An edition transposed to B major was published by Carus-Verlag in 2003, edited by Günter Graulich. The duration is given as 4 minutes.
