= Tröste, tröste uns, Gott =

- Motet by Johann Pachelbel
- English: Console, console us, God
- Catalogue: P. 474
- Text: Psalms 98:1-3, 9
- Language: German
- Duration: 3 min.
- Scoring: 2 SATB choirs; basso continuo

Tröste, tröste uns, Gott (Console, console us, God), P. 474, is a motet for two four-part choirs by Johann Pachelbel, a setting of verses from Psalm 85.

== History and music ==
Pachelbel composed the motet Tröste, tröste uns, Gott, setting verses 5 to 10 from Psalm 85 in the translation into German by Martin Luther. He scored it for a double chorus and basso continuo. The two choirs are used antiphonally.

An edition of the motet was published by Carus-Verlag in 1968, edited by Eberhard Bonitz. The duration is given as 3 minutes. It was recorded in 1994 in a collection of motets by Pachelbel, Johann Christoph Bach and Johann Michael Bach by Cantus Cölln, with one voice on a part, conducted by Konrad Junghänel.
