= Lieber Herr Gott, wecke uns auf =

- Motet by Johann Christoph Bach
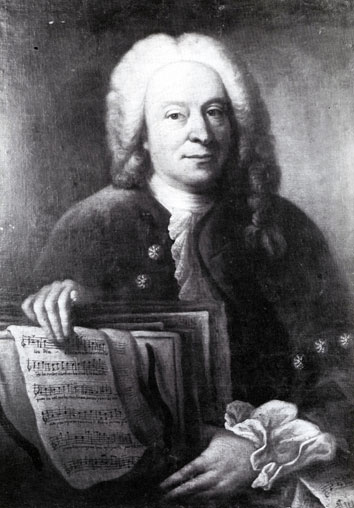
- English: Dear Lord God, wake us up
- Language: German
- Published: 1672
- Scoring: Two SATB choirs

Lieber Herr Gott, wecke uns auf (Dear Lord God, wake us up) is a motet for two four-part choirs by Johann Christoph Bach, setting a prayer for Advent in German.

== History and music ==
Bach composed the motet Lieber Herr Gott, wecke uns auf in 1672. The text is a prayer for Advent, probably translated into German by Martin Luther. Bach scored it for a double chorus and basso continuo. The autograph score is held by the Berlin State Library.
