= Chaconne in D minor (Pachelbel) =

Musical composition by Johann Pachelbel

Chaconne in D minor
Performed by Tibor Pinter on the sample set of Gottfried Silbermann's organ (1722) in Roetha, Germany.

Chaconne in D minor (PWC 41, T. 204, PC 147, POP 14) is an organ chaconne by Johann Pachelbel. It is one of the six surviving chaconnes by the composer, and one of his best known organ works.

The chaconne survives in a single manuscript, the famous Andreas Bach Buch compiled by Johann Christoph Bach (1671–1721), Johann Sebastian Bach's eldest brother. Johann Christoph studied under Pachelbel between 1685 and 1688, and possibly later; they became close friends. The Andreas Bach Buch contains only six works by Pachelbel, though, evidently because Johann Christoph had numerous other copies of Pachelbel's works. In a frequently retold anecdote, one such manuscript, containing works by Froberger, Kerll, and Pachelbel, was studied by the young Johann Sebastian Bach—secretly and at night, because Johann Christoph would forbid him to use the manuscripts. That there is only one extant copy of Chaconne in D minor is typical for the transmission of Pachelbel's chaconnes. All but one (Chaconne in D major, PWC 40, T. 203, PC 145, POP 13) are similarly transmitted in single copies.

Nothing is known about the date of composition of the piece. The Andreas Bach Buch was probably compiled in early 18th century, possibly between 1707 and 1713, although these dates are not certain. The Chaconne in D minor may represent a later stage of development in Pachelbel's style, similar to the four Pachelbel toccatas preserved in ABB, all of which seem to be late works.

The chaconne comprises a theme (8 bars) and 16 variations, the last of which is an almost exact repeat of the theme. This piece is unique among Pachelbel's ostinato works in that the bass pattern is preserved throughout the work without alterations (except for a minor modification in variation 8). The variations are not actual melodic variations based on the theme, but rather free material based on the harmonies provided by bass. The process, which also serves as the basis of some of Pachelbel's other chaconnes, has been described thus: "the harmonies are dissected through an amazing—though controlled—profusion of devices." All variations continue developmentally one into another, making the piece Pachelbel's most structurally sophisticated chaconne. Of the other five ostinato pieces, only the Chaconne in F minor comes close to this design.

Together with the F minor chaconne, the Chaconne in D minor anticipates a number of features found in Johann Sebastian Bach's famous Passacaglia and Fugue in C minor, BWV 582. This includes various melodic and structural details. For instance, the "dactyl" figures of the first variation of Pachelbel's work are found in Bach's passacaglia from bar 32 onwards, as is the written-out "modified repeat" of the second variation.

== Bibliography ==
- Apel, Willi. 1972. The History of Keyboard Music to 1700. Translated by Hans Tischler. Indiana University Press. ISBN 0-253-21141-7. Originally published as Geschichte der Orgel- und Klaviermusik bis 1700 by Bärenreiter-Verlag, Kassel.
- Emery, Walther & Wolff, Christoph (2001). "Bach. III. 7. Johann Sebastian Bach. 1. Childhood". In Sadie, Stanley & Tyrrell, John (eds.). The New Grove Dictionary of Music and Musicians (2nd ed.). London: Macmillan Publishers. ISBN 978-1-56159-239-5.
- Hill, Robert Stephen. 1987. The Möller Manuscript and the Andreas Bach Book: Two keyboard anthologies from the circle of the young Johann Sebastian Bach. Harvard University (dissertation).
- Nolte, Ewald Valentin & Butt, John (2001). "Pachelbel. 1. Johann Pachelbel". In Sadie, Stanley & Tyrrell, John (eds.). The New Grove Dictionary of Music and Musicians (2nd ed.). London: Macmillan Publishers. ISBN 978-1-56159-239-5.
- Welter, Kathryn Jane. 1998. Johann Pachelbel: Organist, Teacher, Composer. A Critical Reexamination of His Life, Works, and Historical Significance, pp. 135–150. Harvard University, Cambridge, Massachusetts (dissertation).
- Williams, Peter F.. 2003. The Organ Music of J. S. Bach. Cambridge University Press. ISBN 0-521-81416-2
