= Herzlich tut mich verlangen =

1611 German Christian hymn

- Lutheran hymn
- Catalogue: Zahn 5385a
- Written: 1611
- Text: by Christoph Knoll
- Language: German
- Melody: by Hans Leo Hassler

"Herzlich tut mich verlangen" (I do desire dearly) is a German hymn, with lyrics written in 1599 by Christoph Knoll, with a melody adapted from a secular song by Hans Leo Hassler. It is a prayer for a blessed death, beginning "Herzlich tut mich verlangen nach einem sel'gen End" (I do desire dearly a blessed end). Its hymn tune, Zahn No. 5385a, was later also used for Paul Gerhardt's "Befiehl du deine Wege" and "O Haupt voll Blut und Wunden".

== History and lyrics ==
Knoll wrote the "geistliches Sterbelied" (spiritual song for the dying) "Herzlich thut mich verlangen nach einem selgen End" (I desire dearly a blessed end) during the plague of 1599. It became known already during his lifetime. It appeared in Görlitz in 1613 in the hymnal Harmoniae sacrae.

Herzlich tut mich verlangen nach einem selgen End, weil ich hier bin umfangen mit Trübsal und Elend. Ich hab Lust abzuscheiden von dieser argen Welt, sehn mich nach ewgen Freuden: o Jesu, komm nur bald.

Du hast mich ja erlöset von Sünde, Tod und Höll; es hat dein Blut gekostet, drauf ich mein Hoffnung stell. Warum sollt mir denn grauen vor Hölle, Tod und Sünd? Weil ich auf dich tu bauen, bin ich ein selig Kind.

Wenngleich süß ist das Leben, der Tod sehr bitter mir, will ich mich doch ergeben, zu sterben willig dir. Ich weiß ein besser Leben, da meine Seel fährt hin; des freu ich mich gar eben: Sterben ist mein Gewinn.

Der Leib zwar in der Erden zum Staube wiederkehrt, doch auferweckt soll werden, durch Christum schön verklärt, wird leuchten als die Sonne und leben ohne Not in Himmelsfreud und Wonne. Was schadt mir denn der Tod?

Gesegn euch Gott der Herre, ihr Vielgeliebten mein! Trauert nicht allzusehre über den Abschied mein! Beständig bleibt im Glauben! Wir werden in kurzer Zeit einander wieder schauen dort in der Ewigkeit.

Nun will ich mich ganz wenden zu dir, Herr Christ, allein: Gib mir ein selig Ende, send mir die Engel dein, führ mich ins ewge Leben, das du erworben hast, da du dich hingegeben für meine Sündenlast.

Hilf, daß ich gar nicht wanke von dir, Herr Jesu Christ; den schwachen Glauben stärke in mir zu aller Frist. Hilf ritterlich mir ringen, dein Hand mich halt mit Macht, daß ich mag fröhlich singen: Gott Lob, es ist vollbracht!

== Hymn tune ==
The tune, "Befiehl du deine Wege" (Zahn No. 5385a), was written by Hans Leo Hassler around 1600 for a secular love song, "Mein G'müt ist mir verwirret", which first appeared in print in the 1601 Lustgarten Neuer Teutscher Gesäng. It was combined with the sacred text "Herzlich tut mich verlangen", first in Brieg in an organ tablature. It was first printed with this text in 1613 in Görlitz in the hymnal Harmoniae sacrae. Johann Crüger published it in 1640 in his hymnal Newes vollkömliches Gesangbuch. He used the same tune for Paul Gerhardt's hymn "O Haupt voll Blut und Wunden" (In English: "O Sacred Head, Now Wounded"), in his Praxis pietatis melica which was published in 1656. The rhythmic melody in phrygian mode was later sung in regular meter. Its phrygian mode and ambiguous harmonies contribute to the affekt of sadness common to all three texts. The hymn appears in 52 hymnals.

== Musical settings ==
The hymn was used as the base for a 1640 composition by Johann Crüger and a four-part setting by Samuel Scheidt, written in 1650. Johann Pachelbel used it in part 3 of his chorale preludes on hymns about dying, Musicalische Sterbens-Gedancken. Georg Philipp Telemann wrote a cantata of the title, translated to singable English as My longing is unbounded, for the feast of Purification. Johann Sebastian Bach used the hymn in the chorale prelude BWV 727 and the Weimar cantata Komm, du süße Todesstunde, BWV 161. It is also the first and last chorale in Bach's Christmas Oratorio.

Johannes Brahms composed two chorale preludes as part of his Eleven Chorale Preludes, Op. 122, in 1896. Max Reger composed a chorale prelude as No. 14 of his 52 Chorale Preludes, Op. 67 in 1902. Jahn Topeit (born 1967) composed a setting for three instruments, titled Gedanken über den Choral "Herzlich tut mich verlangen" (Reflections on the chorale ...), published by Hofmeister in 1998. Bernhard Krol wrote a partita for organ, translated to "My Heart Is Filled With Longing / Partita about dying blessedly. Paul Simon used it for the basis of his song American Tune.
