= Chaconne in F minor =

Musical composition by Johann Pachelbel

Chaconne in F minor
Performed on a church organ in Trubschachen, Switzerland by Burghard Fischer.

Chaconne in F minor
Performed by Tibor Pinter on the sample set of the Marcussen organ, Moerdijk, Netherlands.

Chaconne in F minor (PWC 43, T. 206, PC 149, POP 16) is an organ chaconne by Johann Pachelbel. One of the six surviving chaconnes by the composer, it is one of his best known organ works.

Like most other chaconnes by Pachelbel (with the exception of Chaconne in D major, PWC 40, T. 203, PC 145, POP 13), the Chaconne in F minor survives in a single copy. The manuscript is currently in possession of the Royal Library of Belgium in Brussels (catalogue number MS II.3911) and contains seven groups of pieces, each containing a chaconne. One of these is the Chaconne in F minor, attributed by the scribe to Pachelbel. Another chaconne from the same source, in A major, is also attributed to Pachelbel, but the piece has yet to be examined by the experts (it is included as one of doubtful authorship in the Perreault catalogue, PWC 44). There are also four anonymous chaconnes, possibly composed by a pupil of Pachelbel.

No information concerning the date of composition is known. Since the piece is more sophisticated than most other chaconnes, it may represent a late stage of development of Pachelbel's chaconne style.

The chaconne comprises a theme and 22 variations, the last of which is an almost exact repeat of the theme. The ostinato bass pattern is not kept intact in all variations, and disappears in some, anticipating similar passages in Johann Sebastian Bach's famous Passacaglia and Fugue in C minor, BWV 582. Pachelbel's variation technique serves to "dissect" the harmonies, rather than vary the "theme", which is typical of his mature chaconnes, including the Chaconne in D minor and Chaconne in F major. The Chaconne in F minor has been described as one of Pachelbel's finest works.

== Bibliography ==
- Apel, Willi. 1972. The History of Keyboard Music to 1700. Translated by Hans Tischler. Indiana University Press. ISBN 0-253-21141-7. Originally published as Geschichte der Orgel- und Klaviermusik bis 1700 by Bärenreiter-Verlag, Kassel.
- Hill, Robert Stephen. 1987. The Möller Manuscript and the Andreas Bach Book: Two keyboard anthologies from the circle of the young Johann Sebastian Bach. Harvard University (dissertation).
- Nolte, Ewald Valentin & Butt, John (2001). "Pachelbel. 1. Johann Pachelbel". In Sadie, Stanley & Tyrrell, John (eds.). The New Grove Dictionary of Music and Musicians (2nd ed.). London: Macmillan Publishers. ISBN 978-1-56159-239-5.
- Welter, Kathryn Jane. 1998. Johann Pachelbel: Organist, Teacher, Composer. A Critical Reexamination of His Life, Works, and Historical Significance, pp. 135–150. Harvard University, Cambridge, Massachusetts (dissertation).
- Williams, Peter F.. 2003. The Organ Music of J. S. Bach. Cambridge University Press. ISBN 0-521-81416-2
