= Musicalische Sterbens-Gedancken =

Music collection by Johann Pachelbel

Musicalische Sterbens-Gedancken ("Musical Thoughts on Dying") is a collection of keyboard music by Johann Pachelbel. It was first published in 1683 and contains four sets of chorale variations.

== General information ==
First published in Erfurt in 1683, Musicalische Sterbens-Gedancken is now lost. According to Walther's Musicalisches Lexicon (Leipzig, 1732), four sets of chorale variations constituted the collection, and attempts have been made by musicologists such as Max Seiffert and Hans Joachim Moser to reconstruct the work using Pachelbel's surviving chorale variations. There is little doubt that the collection included the following three pieces:

- Christus, der ist mein Leben, chorale and 12 variations, in G major (G Mixolydian)
- Alle Menschen müssen sterben, chorale and 8 variations, in D major
- Herzlich tut mich verlangen, chorale and 7 variations in C major (Ionian)

Most reconstructions (and editions) include Was Gott tut, das ist wohlgetan", chorale and 9 variations in G major (G Mixolydian), as the final work of the set, based on stylistic similarities. The status of this particular piece is, however, disputed; it has been suggested that Freu dich sehr, o meine Seele (chorale and 12 variations), which survives as a copy made in 1716 by Heinrich Nikolaus Gerber, JS Bach's pupil, should replace Was Gott tut, das ist wohlgetan.

As the title indicates, the collection was probably influenced by the deaths of Pachelbel's first wife, Barbara Gabler, and their only child. They both died in Erfurt in September 1683 during an epidemic.

== Analysis ==
Each work in Musicalische Sterbens-Gedancken begins with a four-part chorale setting followed by several variations, mostly in three voices. At the end, the four-part setting is played again. The variations themselves are not connected to individual stanzas of the chorales. The melodies Christus, der ist mein Leben and Herzlich tut mich verlangen date from the early 17th century, while the other two appeared during its second half and so are from Pachelbel's own time.

There is a simple tonal plan in the collection: the first and the last works are in G Mixolydian, the second is in the dominant key of D major and the third is in the subdominant key of C major (or the Ionian mode). The overall mood of the collection, supported by the major keys, is lighthearted and optimistic. Each set, however, includes a single variation in which there is a subtle sense of grief supported by chromaticisms.

=== Christus, der ist mein Leben ===
Variation 1 uses basic ornamentation of the melody in the soprano, while the two lower voices engage in imitative counterpoint. Variation 2 uses the melody in diminution in the soprano, lower voices provide support in longer note values. Variation 3 utilizes the same principle in reverse, the chorale supported by shorter note values in the bass. Variation 4 consists of rapid arpeggios distributed between hands and based on the harmonic structure of the original melody. Variation 5 engages in three-part imitative counterpoint with the chorale in the middle voice in longer note values. The two-part Variation 6 utilizes more extreme and dynamic diminution and contrasts sharply with Variation 7, which is a slow-paced three-part exploration of the original melody, rich in chromaticisms and darker in mood than the rest of the piece. Variations 8 and 9 both use the melody in long notes (in the bass in Variation 8, in the soprano in Variation 9) with accompaniment in shorter note values. The last three variations change the metre to 12/16 and somewhat gigue-like, joyous in tone; in the final variation the melody is presented using sequences of thirds and sixths in the two upper voices.

=== Alle Menschen müssen sterben ===
In Variation 1, the melody is ornamented slightly and basic imitative patterns are used in lower voices. A more elaborate melodic ornamentation is used in Variation 2, accompanied by longer note values. The next four variations all employ the original melody unadorned, accompanied by passages in shorter note values, sometimes engaging in imitative counterpoint. Variation 7 is the chromatic variation of the set; it is followed by the energetic two-part Variation 8 which is based on parallel thirds arranged in fast-paced passages.

An arrangement of this set of variations exists made by Johann Gottfried Walther. It contains 5 variations and is listed in the Perreault catalogue under number 377b.

=== Herzlich tut mich verlangen ===
"Herzlich tut mich verlangen" is the only chorale in triple metre in Musicalische Sterbens-Gedancken. The original melody was in E Phrygian, but Pachelbel, like many composers of the time, used an Ionian harmonization, presumably to avoid the mood of the Phrygian mode. Variation 1 is a three-part setting of the melody with the bass written out in short note values providing dynamic support to the upper voices. In Variation 2 the melody is subject to diminution, fast ornamented passages moving against the bass line written out in longer note values. Like in Alle Menschen müssen sterben, variations 3 to 6 all employ the melody unadorned and in original note values, with various kinds of accompaniment in shorter note values. Variation 5, the chromatic variation of this set, is a two-part variation and employs chromatic passages in the bass rather than in the melody. The final variation is based on melodic ornamentation, again with miscellaneous kinds of more or less fast passages accompanying.

=== Was Gott tut, das ist wohlgetan ===
Variation 1 features imitative counterpoint in three voices and an ornamented version of the chorale "Was Gott tut, das ist wohlgetan". Following the example of Christus, der ist mein Leben, Variation 2 uses the melody in diminution, accompanied by longer note values in the lower voices and Variation 3 reverses this, using shorter note values in the bass to accompany the unadorned chorale. Variation 4 is the chromatic variation and its somber mood contrasts with Variation 5, which features a heavily ornamented version of the melody in the soprano, mirrored in imitative passages in lower voices. During the next two variations, the original melody serves as a background for the intricate imitative counterpoint in other voices (in Variation 6) and fast arpeggios (the two-part Variation 7). Variation 8 is in 12/8 and gigue-like, while the final variation engages in parallel thirds, reminiscent of all final variations of each set except the one in Herzlich tut mich verlangen.

Pachelbel's sacred concerto Was Gott tut, das ist wohlgetan is based on the same melody and is also a series of variations.
