= Heinrich Bach =

German organist and composer

Heinrich Bach (26 September [O.S. 16 September] 1615 – 20 July [O.S. 10 July] 1692) was a German organist, composer, and a member of the Bach family.

Heinrich Bach was born at Wechmar, and is the father of the so-called Arnstadt Line. After the early death of his father, his older brother Johannes Bach continued his music education and taught him organ playing. They moved to Suhl and Schweinfurt. From 1635 to 1641, he was Ratsmusikant in the Erfurt Ratsmusikanten-Compagnie led by Johannes. From 1641, he became organist in Arnstadt's St. Mary's Church and the Upper Church, a post he kept until his death. In 1642, he married Eva Hoffmann, the younger daughter of Suhl Stadtpfeiffer Hoffmann. Bach died in Arnstadt.

Three of his sons, Johann Christoph Bach, Johann Michael Bach and Johann Günther Bach, were musicians.

== Works ==
Only a few of his works have been preserved:

- Cantata Ich danke dir, Gott, a church cantata for the 17th Sunday after Trinity conserved in the Altbachisches Archiv
- Ach, dass ich Wassers gnug hätte Vocal Concerto (This work has long since been shown to be by his son Johann Christoph; Grove lists work under Johann Christoph)
- Kyrie
- Zwei Sonaten à 5
- Da Christus an dem Kreuze stund
- Erbarm dich mein, o Herre Gott
