= Johann Wilhelm Drese =

German composer

Johann Wilhelm Drese (bapt. 8 July 1677; bur. 25 June 1745) was a German composer. He succeeded his father Samuel Drese as Kapellmeister (capellmaster) at Weimar.

== Education ==
In 1702, he spent eight months in Italy studying composition. Music by Italian composers was appreciated at Weimar.

== Career ==
Johann Wilhelm was vice-capellmaster from 1704 at Weimar and succeeded his father as capellmaster when he died in 1716. Drese died in Erfurt.

== Drese and Bach ==
Johann Wilhelm and his father were colleagues of Johann Sebastian Bach, who was employed at Weimar briefly in 1703 and returned in 1708. Bach was promoted in 1714 to concertmaster, but the position ranked below capellmaster.

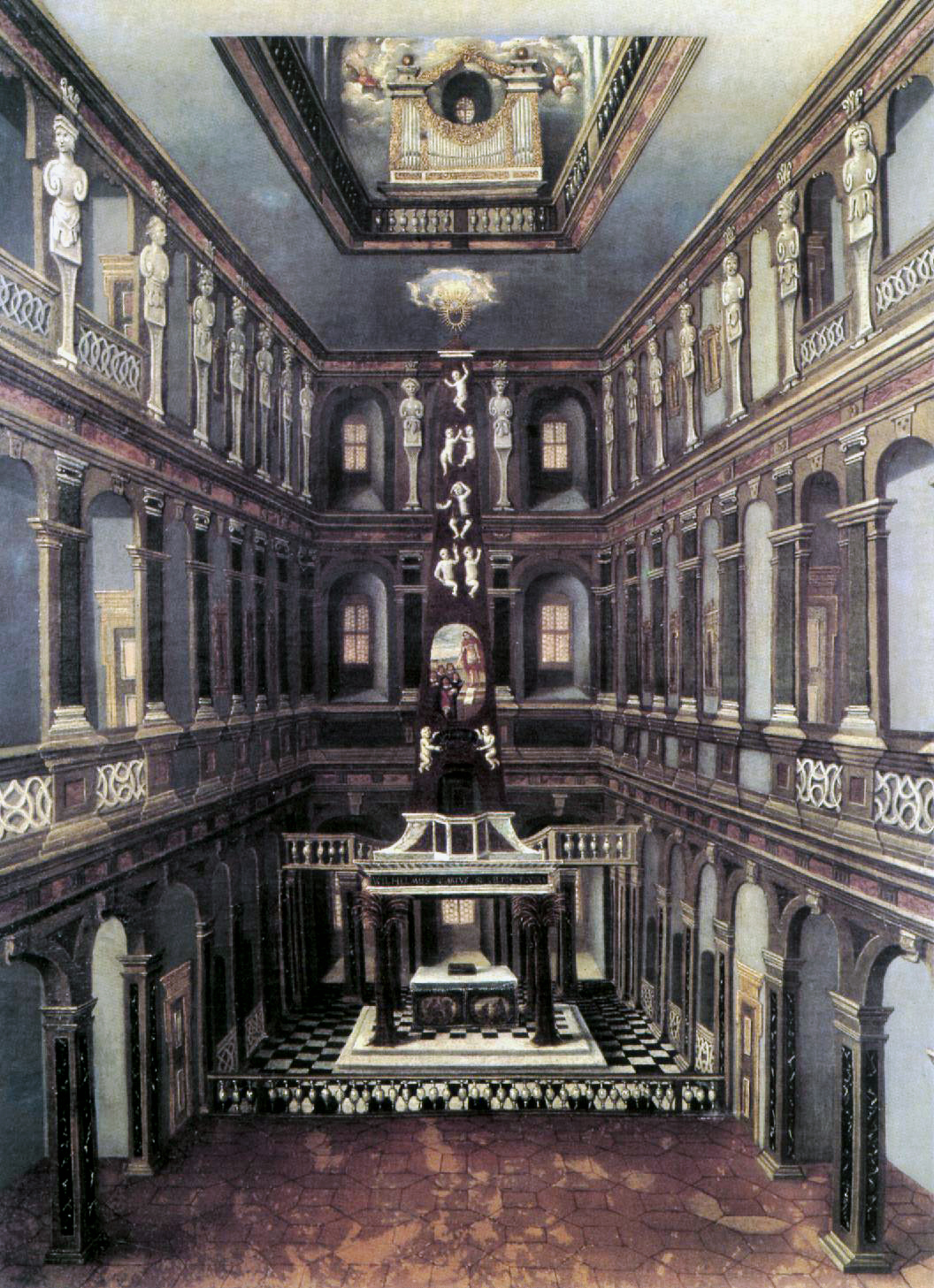
The Baroque Schlosskirche (court chapel) with the organ high above the altar, by Christian Richter, c. 1660

For two years the three men shared responsibility for church music at the Schlosskirche (court chapel) with Bach writing a new cantata every month. When the elder Drese died, Bach appears to have taken a dim view of Johann Wilhelm's promotion to capellmaster and sought employment elsewhere.
