= Christoph Knoll =

German theologian and hymn writer

Christoph Knoll (1563–1630) was a German theologian and hymn writer.

Knoll was born in Bunzlau, the son of a shoemaker. He studied theology from 1583 at the University of Frankfurt an der Oder and the following year at the Wittenberg University. He was also interested in mathematics and astronomy. He was Signator in Sprottau in 1584 or 1586, and Diakon (dean) there from 1591. Knoll died in Sprottau.

During the plague of 1599, Knoll wrote his "geistliches Sterbelied" (spiritual song for the dying) "Herzlich thut mich verlangen nach einem selgen End". It became known already during his lifetime. It appeared in Görlitz in 1613 in the hymnal Harmoniae sacrae with the melody of Hans Leo Haßler's love song "Mein G’müt ist mir verwirret". The same melody was later used by Johann Crüger for Paul Gerhardt's "O Haupt voll Blut und Wunden".

== Selected works ==
- Trostbüchlein oder Praxi articulorum de resurrectione carnis et vita aeterna (ohne Jahr, ohne Ort)
- "Herzlich thut mich verlangen nach einem selgen End" (1599)
- Calendarium generale perpetuum (Liegnitz 1619)
- Im Leben und im Sterben

== Literature ==
- "Knoll, Christoph" . Allgemeine Deutsche Biographie (in German). Vol. 16. Leipzig: Duncker & Humblot. 1882. p. 320.
- Susanne Siebert (1992). "Knoll, Christoph". In Bautz, Traugott (ed.). Biographisch-Bibliographisches Kirchenlexikon (BBKL) (in German). Vol. 4. Herzberg: Bautz. col. 159. ISBN 3-88309-038-7.
