= Johann Samuel Drese =

German composer

Johann Samuel Drese (c. 1644 – 1 December 1716) was a German composer. In 1683 he was appointed Kapellmeister of the ducal court in Weimar. He held this post until his death which meant that he was in charge of music at court during almost all the time Johann Sebastian Bach was working in Weimar, a brief stay in 1703 and a second period from 1708 until after Drese's death.

Other members of the family were musical. His son Johann Wilhelm Drese succeeded him as Kapellmeister in Weimar. His cousin was Adam Drese.
