= Adam Drese =

German composer and musician

Adam Drese (December 1620 – 15 February 1701 in Arnstadt) was a German composer, kapellmeister, and bass viol player of the baroque period.

== Life ==
Adam Drese was born in the German state of Thuringia. He became a musician at the court of Duke Wilhelm IV of Saxe-Weimar in Weimar before being sent by the duke to Warsaw to study with Marco Scacchi. He returned to Weimar and was appointed as the duke's Kapellmeister in 1652. In 1662, after the death of Duke Wilhelm IV, the Hofkapelle was disbanded, the duke's son, duke Bernhard took Drese to Jena, where he appointed him as his Kapellmeister, secretary and also the town mayor from 1672. Despite Duke Bernhards's death in 1678, Drese remained in Jena until 1683, when he found another post as Kapellmeister, to the Count of Schwarzburg at Arnstadt. He remained in Arnstadt until his death in 1701.

== Works ==
It is thought that most of Drese's output has been lost. His surviving pieces include sacred and secular vocal works, as well as some instrumental Sonatas and Suites. Most notably, 3 sonatas by Drese were included in the 1662 manuscript collection Partiturbuch Ludwig. He became known in his time for the composition of several chorale melodies which used the texts from Georg Neumark's Das Poetisch-musikalische Lustwäldlein and Nicolaus Zinzendorf's Jesu, geh voran. These melodies were set by many composers of following generations as part of their own sacred works.

== List of works ==
- Erster Theil etlicher neuen Balletten, Capriccien, Couranten und Sarabanden, mit 1. 2. und 3. Violen sampt dem General Bass gesetzt (published Jena, 1645)
- Wunder, was muß dieses seyn. An dem hocherfrewlichem Geburts-Tage der Frawen Eleonoren Dorotheen, Hertzogin zu Sachsen for soprano and continuo (published Jena, 1648)
- Funeral music Wie seelig sind die Todten. Traur- und Begräbnüs-Lied auff den Hintritt deß Herrn Caspar Ermes (published Erfurt, 1648)
- Klag-Liedt. Der hochbetrübten Frauen Witwen... (published Jena, 1655)
- Folgen acht Lieder for soprano and continuo (published Jena, 1666)
- Erster Theil Etlicher Allemanden, Couranten, Sarabanden, Balletten, Intraden und andern Arien mit theils darbei befindlichen Doublen, oder Variationen (published Jena, 1672)
- Aria à 4 Wolauff mein gantzes Ich (published ?)
- Sonata à 2 for violin, viola da gamba and continuo (in Partiturbuch Ludwig, 1662)
- Sonata à 3 for 2 violins, viola da gamba and continuo, (in Partiturbuch Ludwig, 1662)
- Sonata à 6 in C major for 2 cornettini or pochettes, 2 cornetti or violins, 2 trombones or viols, and continuo, (in Partiturbuch Ludwig, 1662)
- Sacred Concerto Plötzlich rede ich wider (manuscript in the archive of Sing-akademie zu Berlin)
- Motet Das Himmelreich ist gleich einem Könige (manuscript in the Düben Collection of Uppsala University
- Aria à 4 Nun ist alles überwunden (manuscript dated 6 July 1686, Arnstadt; in the archive of Sing-akademie zu Berlin)
- Chorale melody Dir ergeb' ich mich Jesu ewiglich
- Chorale melody Seelenbräutigam Jesu Gottes Lamm used as the basis of a tune Arnstadt for the English hymn 'Round me falls the night' by William Romanis 1824-1899 (New English Hymnal #249).
- Chorale melody Jesu zeuch mein Herz
- Chorale melody Wer ist wohl wie du
- Chorale melodyJesu rufe mich von der Welt
- Chorale melody Wahrer Mensch und Gott

== See also ==
- Altbachisches Archiv

== Bibliography ==
- Biography at hymnary.org
- Oxford Composer Companions, J.S. Bach, 1999, p. 142
