= Johann Christoph Bach =

German composer and organist

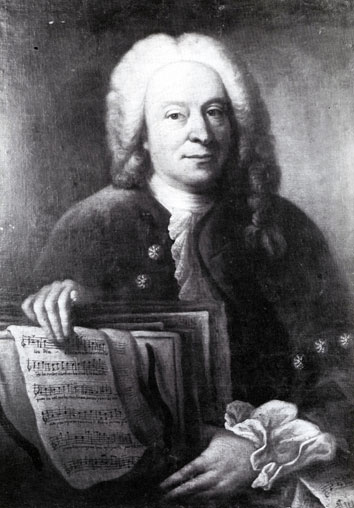
- Born: 1642; Arnstadt
- Died: 31 March 1703 (aged 60–61); Eisenach
- Occupations: Composer; Organist

Johann Christoph Bach (baptised 18 December [O.S. 8 December] 1642 – 31 March 1703) was a German composer and organist of the Baroque period. Johann Christoph was an older cousin of Johann Sebastian Bach who would later describe him in his Genealogy (Ursprung, 1735) as "the profound composer", suggesting a solid reputation not only within the family but also in wider musical society. He is not to be confused with Johann Sebastian Bach's son, Johann Christoph Friedrich Bach.

== Biography ==
=== Early life and family connections ===
Johann Christoph was born at Arnstadt, the son of Heinrich Bach and a first cousin of J.S. Bach's father Johann Ambrosius Bach. This made Johann Christoph J.S. Bach's first cousin once removed. Furthermore, Johann Christoph was the uncle of Maria Barbara Bach, J. S. Bach's second cousin and first wife.

=== Marriage and offspring ===
Johann Christoph married Maria Elisabeth Wiedemann in 1667. They had seven children, including four sons who became musicians: Johann Nicolaus (10 October 1669 – 4 November 1753), Johann Christoph Jr. (29 August 1676 – ca.1730), Johann Friedrich (1682–1730), and Johann Michael (1685–unknown). Only Johann Christoph Jr. had sons who immigrated to America (in 1740), which has been documented in several books including, The Bach (Back) Family from Southeastern Kentucky by Dr. Mary Back Simpson.

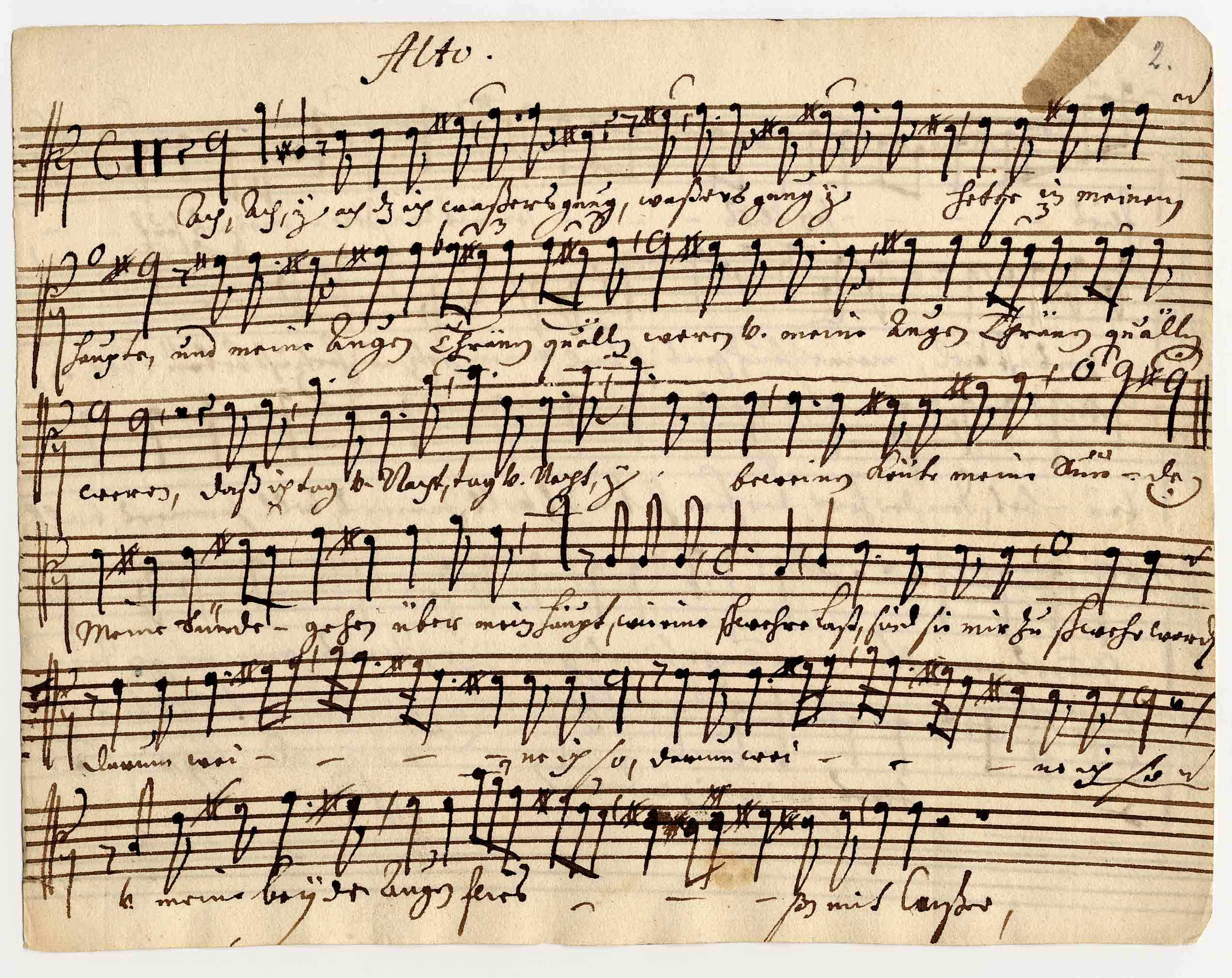
Autograph manuscript of the Lamento: Ach, daß ich Wassers g'nug hätte, University of Uppsala

=== Career ===
Johann Christoph Bach was organist of St George's church at Eisenach, the capital of the Dukes of Saxe-Eisenach. He was also employed as a member of the Ducal court. Perhaps his best known works are the cantata Meine Freundin, du bist schön, based on the Song of Solomon; the 4-part chorale prelude "An Wasserflüssen Babylon"; the motet Lieber Herr Gott, wecke uns auf; and Lamento: Ach, daß ich Wassers g'nug hätte, a church cantata for alto and strings.

Despite his steady employment as a musician he was heavily in debt when he died at Eisenach. He died just ten days after his wife Maria died.
