= Johann Michael Bach =

German composer

- Baptised: 19 August [O.S. 9 August] 1648
- Died: 27 May [O.S. 17 May] 1694
- Era: Baroque
- Relatives: Bach Family

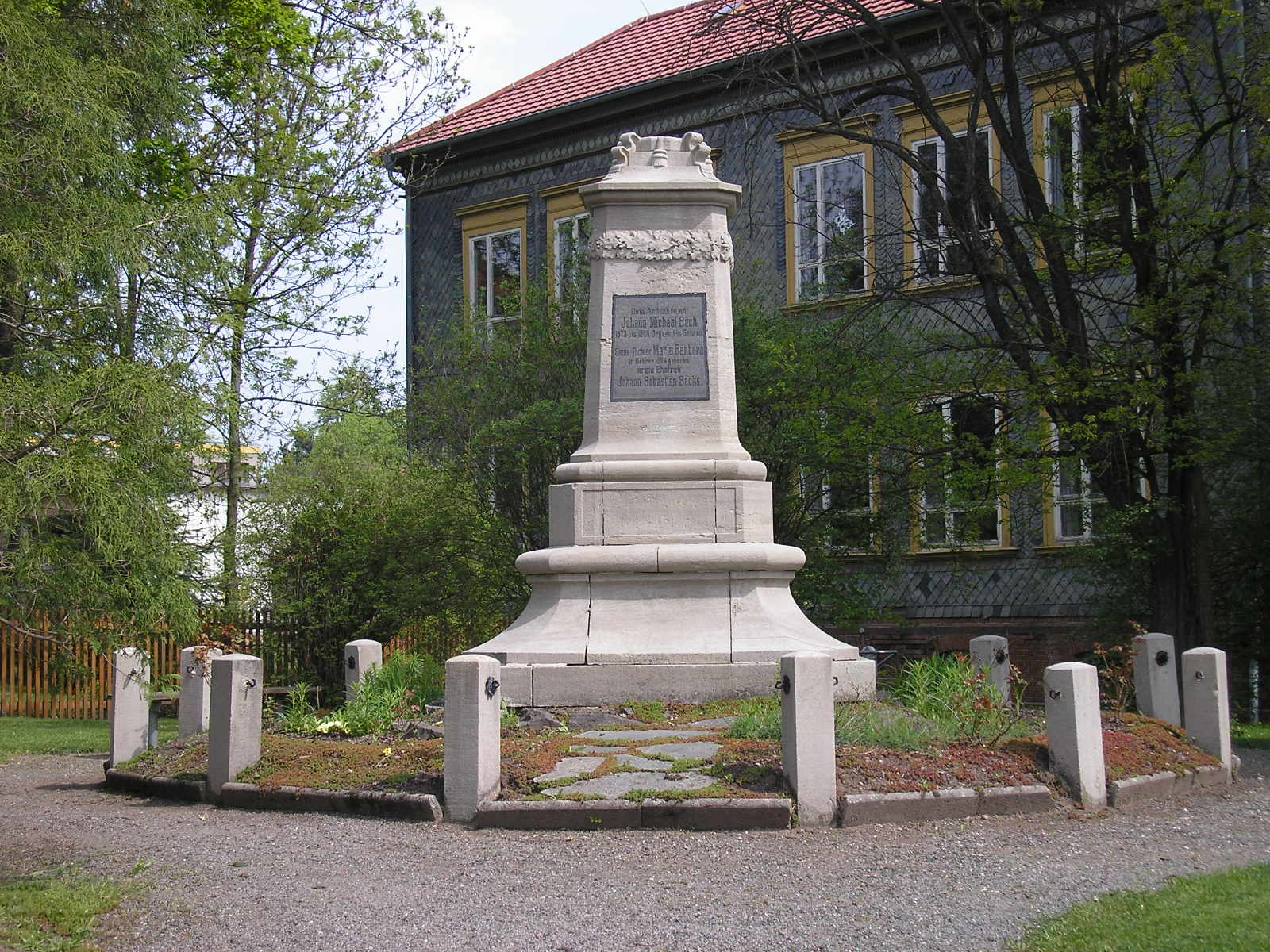
Memorial of Johann Michael Bach in Gehren.

Johann Michael Bach (baptised 19 August [O.S. 9 August] 1648, Arnstadt, Schwarzburg-Sondershausen – 27 May [O.S. 17 May] 1694, Gehren) was a German composer of the Baroque period. He was the brother of Johann Christoph Bach, as well as first cousin, once removed and father-in-law of Johann Sebastian Bach (he was the father of J.S. Bach's first wife Maria Barbara Bach). He is sometimes referred to as the "Gehrener Bach" to distinguish him from the "Wuppertaler Bach", Johann Michael Bach (musician at Wuppertal).

== Life ==
Johann Michael was born at Arnstadt, the son of Heinrich Bach, who was the great-uncle of Johann Sebastian Bach. In 1673, Johann Michael became the organist and town clerk of Gehren, where he lived until his death.

== Works ==
His most-performed work is the small chorale prelude for organ, In Dulci Jubilo, which for many years was attributed to J. S. Bach (it was ascribed the catalog number BWV 751). His other most important works include cantatas Ach, bleib bei uns, Herr Jesu Christ (for choir, strings and continuo), Liebster Jesu, hör mein Flehen (for soprano, alto, two tenors, bass, strings and continuo), and Ach, wie sehnlich wart' ich der Zeit (also for soprano, strings, and continuo).

- Das Blut Christi
- Ach wie sehnlich wart ich der Zeit
- Auf, lasst uns den Herren loben
- Halt was du hast
- Fürchtet euch nicht
- Sei lieber Tag willkommen
- Ich weiss, dass mein Erlöser lebt
- Herr, ich warte auf dein Heil
- Herr, wenn ich dich nur habe
- Unser Leben währet siebenzig Jahre

In addition to composing music, J. M. Bach made musical instruments, including harpsichords.
