= Genealogy book =

Book used to record the family history of ancestors

A genealogy book or register is used in Asia and Europe to record the family history of ancestors.

== Greater China ==
Zupu
- Traditional Chinese: 族譜
- Simplified Chinese: 族谱
Transcriptions
Standard Mandarin
- Hanyu Pinyin: zúpǔ

It is the Chinese tradition to record family members in a book, including every male born in the family, who they are married to, etc. Traditionally, only males' names are recorded in the books, although newer compilations since the 1980s usually include women.

During the Cultural Revolution, many of the books were destroyed, because they were considered by the Chinese Communist Party as among the Four Olds which should be obliterated or broken. Therefore, much valuable cultural history was destroyed forever. In Taiwan, Hong Kong, and areas untouched by the revolution, many Chinese people still kept their genealogy books, some of which are thousands of years old. According to Guinness World Records, the oldest genealogy book is that of the Confucius family.

== India ==
In India, the Hindu genealogy registers at Haridwar have been a subject of study for many years and have been microfilmed by Genealogical Society of Utah (GSU) USA. In India, Michael Lobo has been involved in documenting and compiling the history and genealogy of families belonging to the Mangalorean Catholic community since 1993, under a research project entitled "A Genealogical Encyclopaedia of Mangalorean Catholic Families". As of 2009, his work covers over a thousand families and is being continually updated with names and records of new families. Lobo claims that the Mangalorean Catholic community has the distinction of being the only community in the world to possess its own genealogical encyclopaedia.

== Ireland ==
Genealogy has been a fundamental part of Irish culture since prehistory. Of the many surviving manuscripts, a large number are devoted to genealogy, either for a single family, or many. It was practised in both Gaelic and Anglo-Norman Ireland. A number of the more notable books include:

- Leabhar na nGenealach (The Great Book of Irish Genealogies)
- The Ó Cléirigh Book of Genealogies
- The Book of the Burkes
- Leabhar Adhamh Ó Cianáin
- An Leabhar Muimhneach
- Leabhar Donn

Families who were professional historians included Clan Ó Duibhgeannáin, Ó Cléirigh, Clan MacFhirbhisigh, Ó Maolconaire.

== Korea ==
- jokbo
- Hangul: 족보
- Hanja: 族譜
- RR: jokbo
- MR: chokpo

In Korea the genealogy book is called jokbo or chokbo. The book is passed down through generations, and copies are often printed and distributed among family members as necessary. The firstborn son of each family (in a form of primogeniture) inherits the original jokbo (as opposed to the copies) and continues the genealogy and family line. It was often used in pre-modern (i.e., post-Joseon period) Korea as proof of being of the yangban class, since family names were conferred only to the aristocratic class until late Joseon dynasty. Many of these genealogy books date back to the Goryeo dynasty (918–1392) but few families retain complete copies due to the wars, uprisings, and the Japanese Occupation that took place in recent history.

While many clans still maintain a jokbo, its function (which was very important, heavily relied upon, and legally binding before the modern era) is largely relegated to clan record-keeping and other minor (i.e., not legally binding) social roles.

== Vietnam ==
The gia phả of the Nguyễn Tựu clan (阮就).

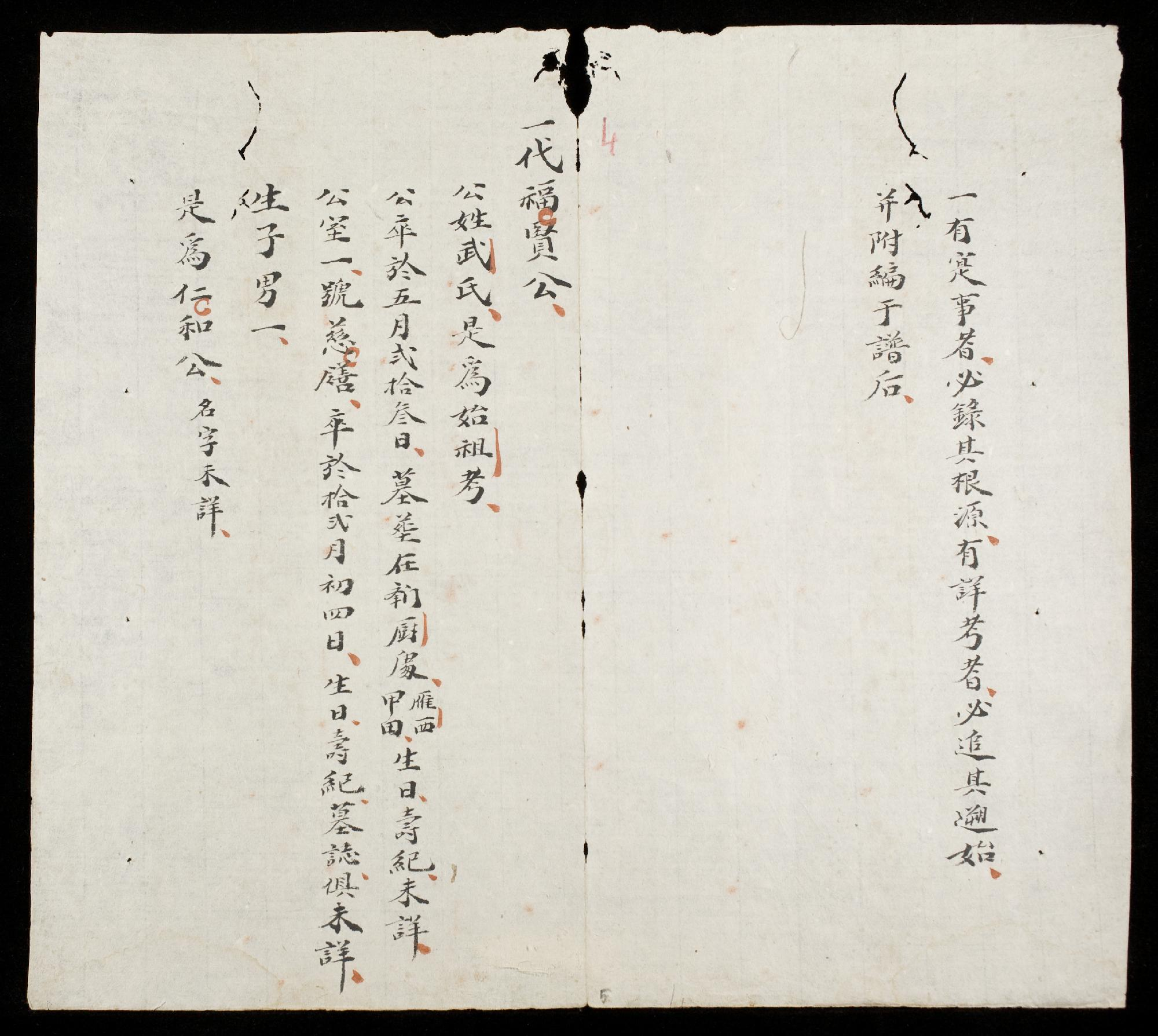
The gia phả written in Literary Chinese.

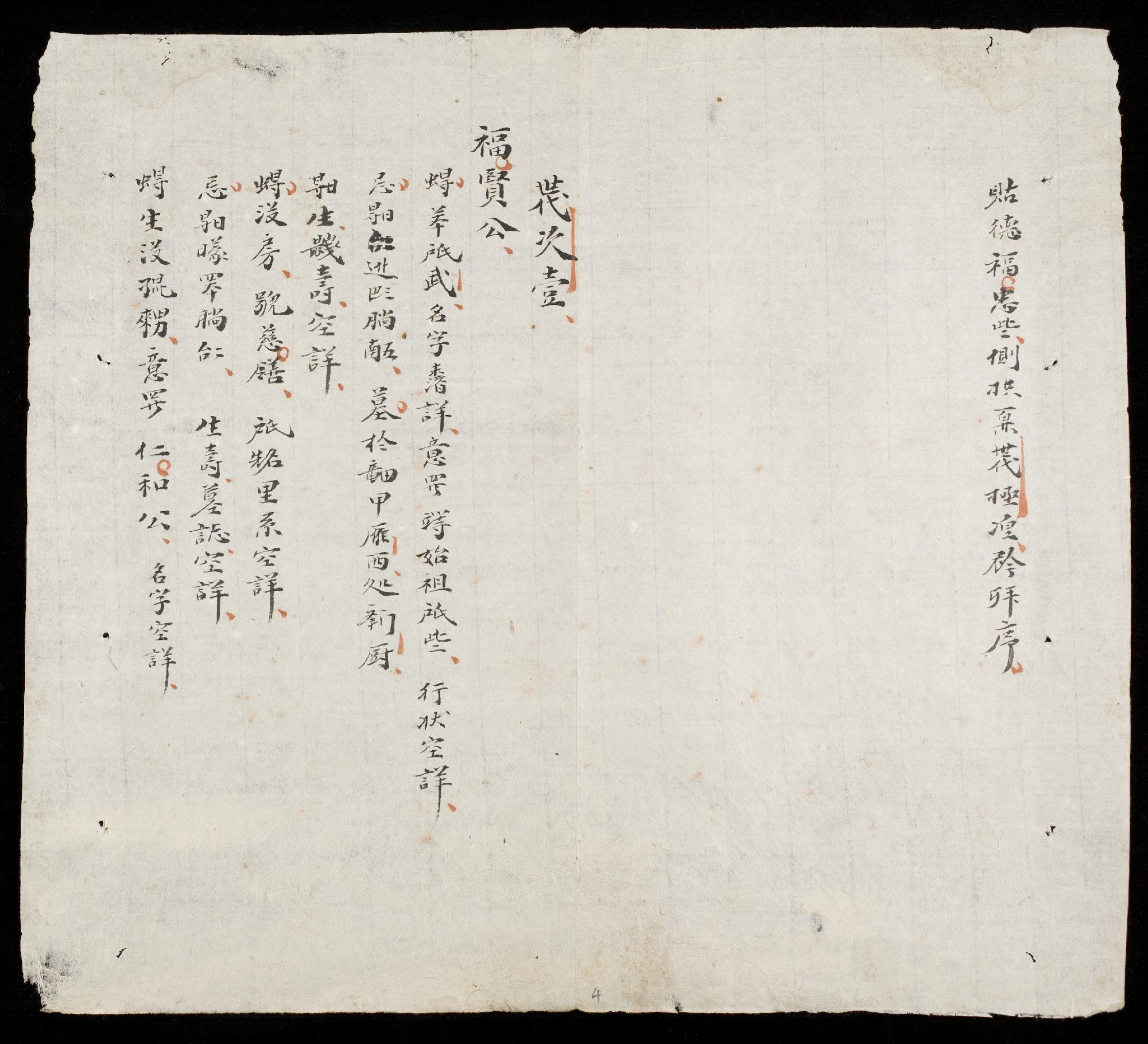
The gia phả written in Vietnamese (Nôm).

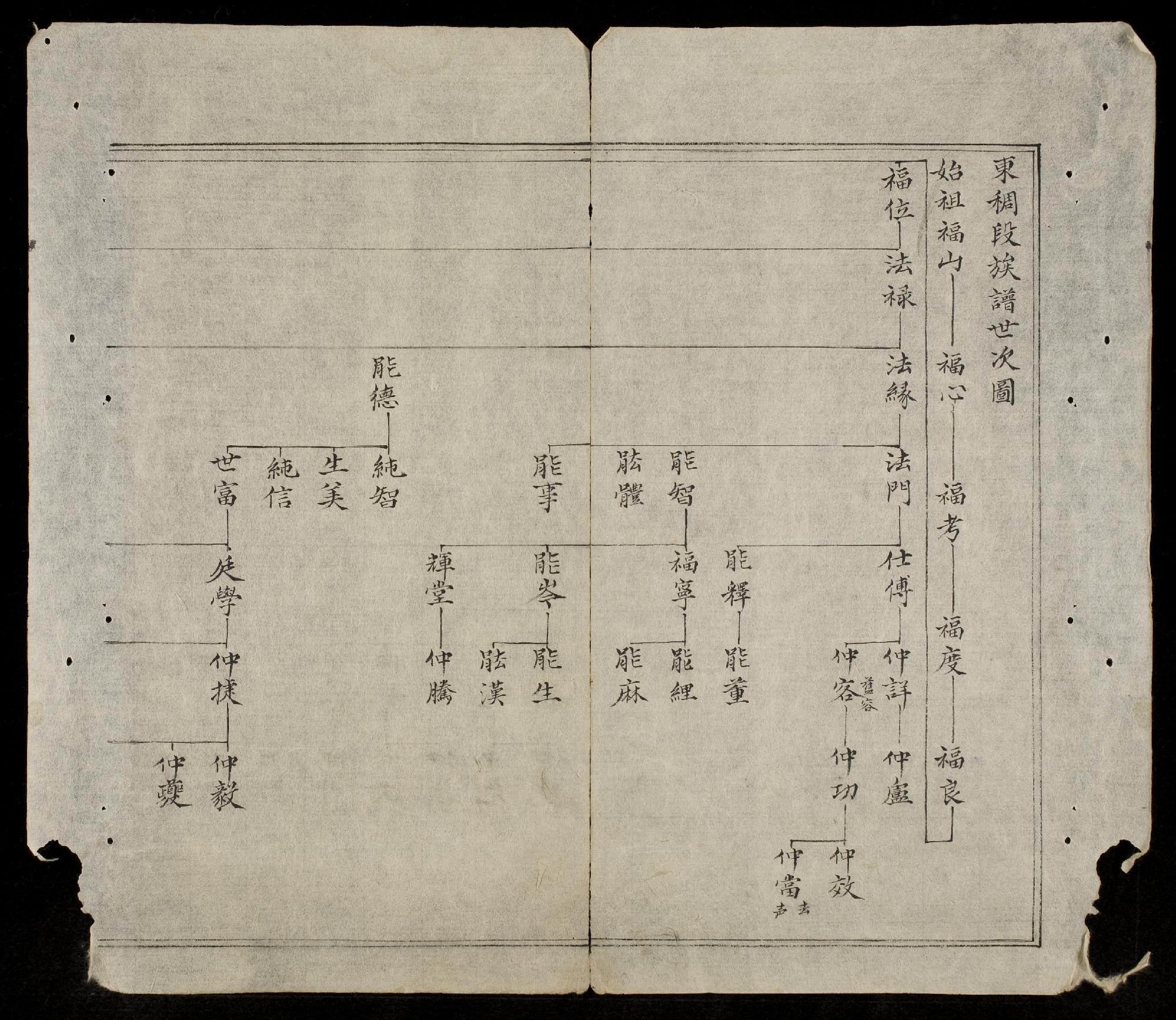
A genealogy diagram in the gia phả of Đông Trù Đoàn clan (東稠段).

Genealogy books are referred to in Vietnamese as gia phả/gia phổ (chữ Hán: 家譜). They are used to record names, dates of their birth, death anniversaries, and burial places of ancestors. These books can be written in Literary Chinese or Vietnamese written in chữ Nôm albeit it is uncommon. In the present day, genealogy books are now written in the Vietnamese alphabet.

The books also record how many sons and daughters were there in a certain generation. However they generally only record the names of the sons. It also contained clan regulations for ancestor worship such as certain days of observance. Genealogy books also write down notable events during a clan's history such as during the third generation of the Nguyễn Tựu clan (阮就), it records that they were forced to change their surname from Vũ (武) to Nguyễn (阮). Another example would be in the genealogy of the Giang Family (Vietnamese: Giang Thị gia phả, chữ Hán: 江氏家譜) where it wrote how the envoy Giang Văn Minh responded to the Ming emperor's couplet:

藤江自古血猶紅

Đằng Giang tự cổ huyết do hồng

Since ancient times, the waters of the Đằng River have run crimson with blood.

The line recalls the fact that the Vietnamese defeated various Chinese dynasties three times on the Bạch Đằng River. At that time, this couplet was considered a deep insult to the Ming Emperor, who ordered Giang Văn Minh to be killed and his belly cut open to see "how bold and daring the Annamese envoy was", then had his body embalmed with mercury and brought back to his country. When his body arrived at Thang Long Citadel, Emperor Lê Thần Tông and Lord Trịnh Tráng paid homage to his coffin. He was posthumously awarded the title of Left Minister of Public Works, and bestowed the sentence:

使不辱君命、可謂千古英雄。

Sứ bất nhục quân mệnh, khả vị thiên cổ anh hùng.

An envoy who does not disgrace his sovereign’s mandate may be hailed as a hero for the ages.

== See also ==
- Genealogy
- Family tree
