= Bach (surname) =

Bach is a surname of German-language origin. Notable people with the surname include:

== The family of Johann Sebastian Bach ==
- Johann Sebastian Bach ("JSB", 1685–1750), composer and organist, the most well-known of the Bachs
- Wilhelm Friedemann Bach (1710–1784), composer and organist, son of JSB
- Carl Philipp Emanuel Bach (1714–1788), composer, harpsichordist and pianist, son of JSB
- Johann Aegidius Bach (1645–1716), organist and conductor, uncle of JSB
- Johann Ambrosius Bach (1645–1695), violinist and trumpeter, father of JSB
- Johann Bernhard Bach (1676–1749) composer, harpsichordist and organist, cousin of JSB
- Johann Christoph Friedrich Bach (1732–1795), composer, son of JSB
- Johann Christian Bach (1735–1782), composer, son of JSB
- Johann Christoph Bach (1642–1703), composer and organist, great-uncle of JSB
- Johann Gottfried Bernhard Bach (1715–1739), organist, son of JSB
- Johann Ludwig Bach (1677–1731), composer and violinist, second cousin of JSB
- Johann Michael Bach (1648–1694), composer and organist, great-uncle and father-in-law of JSB
- Johann Michael Bach III (1745–1820), composer and lawyer, nephew of JSB
- Johann Sebastian Bach (painter) (1748–1778), painter, grandson of JSB

== Others ==
- Baron Alexander von Bach (1813–1893), Austrian politician and statesman
- Barbara Bach (born 1947), American actress
- Bela Bach (born 1990), German politician
- Børge Bach (1945–2016), Danish footballer
- Catherine Bach (born 1954), American actress
- Claus-Peter Bach, German rugby union official
- Dirk Bach (1961–2012), German actor
- Edward Bach (1886–1936), British medical doctor known for his work in alternative medicine
- Emmanuelle Bach (born 1968), French film and television actress
- Emmon Bach (1929–2014), American linguist
- Ernst Bach (1876–1929), German comedy writer
- Franciscus Hermanus Bach (1865–1956), Dutch painter
- Fritz Bach (1934–2011), Austrian-born American transplant physician and immunobiologist
- Franz Josef Bach (1917–2001), German politician
- Gottlieb Bach (1900–1973), Danish distance runner
- Jan Bach (1937–2020), American composer
- Jean Bach (1918–2013), American film director
- John Bach (born 1946), New Zealand actor
- Kent Bach (born 1943), American philosopher
- Kristina Bach (born 1962), German singer
- Marie Bach Hansen (born 1985), Danish actress
- Mary Bach (born 1944), American consumer rights activist
- Mechthild Bach (1949–2011), German soprano
- Nenad Bach (born 1954), Croatian American recording artist, composer, performer, producer and peace activist
- Ole Christian Bach (1957–2005), Norwegian financier
- Pamela Bach (1963–2025), American actress
- Paul Bach (1938–2011), English journalist and editor
- Pierre-Antoine-Jean Bach (1932–2020), French-born Laotian Roman Catholic prelate
- Rasmus Bach (born 1995), Danish basketball player
- Richard Bach (born 1936), American novelist
- Robert Bach (1901–1976), German politician
- Sebastian Bach (born 1968), Canadian former lead singer of Skid Row, and later performer on Broadway
- Sebastian Bach (racing driver) (born 2008), Danish racing driver
- Sheldon Bach (1925–2021), American psychologist
- Tamara Bach (born 1976), German youth book author
- Thomas Bach (born 1953), German sports official and former president of the International Olympic Committee (IOC)
- Vincent Bach (1890–1976), Austro-American cornet and trumpet player and manufacturer
- Vivi Bach (1939–2013), Danish actress and singer
- Hendrik Bach (born 2006), German aprentice

== See also ==
- Bache (disambiguation)
- Bạch (a Vietnamese surname)
