= Bai (surname) =

Bái
- Romanization: Bái (Mandarin); Baak (Hong Kong Cantonese); Pha̍k, Pag (Hakka); Pe̍h, Pe̍eh, Pe̍k, Pia̍k (Hokkien); Bêh, Ma (Teochew); Bạch (Vietnamese)

Origin
- Language: Chinese
- Meaning: White(color)
- Region of origin: China; Mongolia

Other names
- Variant forms: Bianca, Fatimah, Pekasa, Pekerti, Peris, Purnomo, Wongsorejo (Indonesian)

Bái is the pinyin of the surname 白, meaning the colour white.

== Origin ==
=== Han Chinese origins ===
- a surname used by descendants of Bai Fu (白阜), a minister of the legendary Emperor Yan.
- a surname used by descendants of Baigong Sheng, the son of a crown prince and grandson of King Ping of the State of Chu during the Spring and Autumn period.
- a surname used by the descendants of a prince named Bai, son of Duke Wu of the state of Qin.
- a surname used by descendants of Baiyi Bing, a general under Duke Mu of Qin.
- a surname used by residents of the Tang dynasty province Baizhou (白州).

=== Other ethnic origins ===
- a surname used by the Mongols, a translation of the surname Chagan (Mongolian: ᠴᠠᠭᠠᠨ, romanized: Chaɣan, lit. 'white'), possibly derived from Bayads, Borjigits, or Borjigins.
- a surname used by the Manchus of Nara, Gūwalgiya, Irgen Gioro and Bayara Gioro (a branch of Aisin Gioro).
- during the ancient Tang dynasty in modern-day Yunnan, the Bai people used the surname Bai after their tribe name
- a surname used by the ancient Donghu people.
- a surname used by the ancient people of Kucha (or Qiuci). Kucha was an ancient country located in current Xinjiang province of China.

== Alternate spellings ==
- Mandarin: Bái, Pai
- Taiwan: Pai
- Cantonese (Hong Kong and Macao): Baak^{6}, Pak
- Min Nan (Hokkien (Fujian)/Teochew): Pe̍h, Pe̍k, Peh
- Vietnamese: Bạch
- Korean: Baek, Paik, Baik, Baeg (백), based on the same Chinese letter 白
- Japanese: Bekku, Haku, Hyaku, Byaku

== Notable people ==
- Bai Qi (白起; died 257 BC), Qin general of the Warring States period
- Bai Juyi (白居易; 772–846), Tang dynasty poet
- Bai Renfu (白仁甫; 1226–1306), Yuan dynasty playwright
- Bai Chongxi (白崇禧; 1893–1966), Chinese Muslim general of the Republic of China
- Bai Shouyi (白寿彝; 1909–2000) (Arabic name: Djamal al-Din Bai Shouyi) Chinese Muslim historian
- Pai Hsien-yung (白先勇; born 1937), Chinese Muslim writer
- Pak Kian Huat (白建发; born 1937), Singaporean convicted murder; see 2019 Toa Payoh chopper attack
- Bai Shuxiang (白淑湘; born 1939), Chinese ballet dancer
- Rose Pak (白蘭; 1947–2016) Chinese-born political activist in San Francisco, California
- Lou Pai (白露龍; born 1947), Chinese-American businessman and former Enron executive
- Peh Chin Hua (白振华; born 1947), Singaporean politician
- Peh Thian Hui (白添辉; born 1953), Singaporean convicted rapist
- Bai Chunli (白春礼; born 1953), Manchus, Chinese physical chemist and nanoscientist, President of the Chinese Academy of Sciences
- Bai Wenqi (白文奇; born 1955), Lieutenant general of the PLA Air Force
- Simon Peh Yun-lu (白韞六; born 1955), Hong Kong civil servant
- Beh Meng Chai (白明才; born 1960), Malaysian murderer; see Jurong fishing port murders
- Bai Ling (白灵; born 1966), Chinese-born American actress
- Bai Yansong (白岩松; born 1968), Chinese host
- Pai Kun-Hong (白昆弘; born 1970), Taiwanese baseball player
- Bai Jie (白洁; born 1972), Chinese female footballer
- Pai Hsiao-yen (白曉燕; 1980–1997), Taiwanese teenage idol and victim of a fatal kidnapping
- Bai Jing (白静; 1983–2012), Chinese actress
- Joanne Peh Wei Siew (白薇秀; born 1983), Singaporean actress and television host
- Michelle Bai (白冰; born 1986), Chinese actress and singer
- Bai An (白安; born 1991), Taiwanese singer, Manchurian
- Pek Jin Shen (白敬生; born 1992), Singaporean rapper better known by his stage name Shigga Shay
- Bai Jingting (白敬亭; born 1993), Chinese actor
- Bai Lu (白鹿; born 1994), Chinese actress and model
- Vanessa Peh Ting Ting (白婷婷; born 1994), Singaporean actress
- Peck Yen Wei (白燕微; born 1996), Malaysian badminton player
- Peter Pek (died 2018), chief executive of the World Branding Forum
- Bai Chong'en (白重恩) Chinese economist
- Fan Bai, researcher and engineer

=== 柏 Bǎi ===
- Bai Wenwei (柏文蔚; 1876–1947), KMT General, Governor of Anhui Province, Advisor to Presidential Palace, Chairman Anhui Provincial Government, KMT Central Party Committee, and Central Executive Committee
- Bai Xiaolei (柏小磊; born 1985) is a Chinese football player born in Dalian
- Bai Yan (柏衍; born 1989) is a Chinese male tennis player born in Nanjing, Jiangsu
- Bai Jiajun (柏佳骏; born 1991) is a Chinese football player
- Penname: Bo Yang (柏楊; 1920 – 2008), was a Taiwanese poet, essayist and historian, real name Guo Dingsheng (郭定生)

=== 拜 Bài ===
- Pai Tzu-li, (拜自立; died 1937) Chinese Muslim General of the Republic of China

=== As part of a stagename/pseudonym ===
- Bai Guang (白光 stagename) (1921–1999), birth name Shi Yongfen (史永芬) movie star and singer

=== Korean ===
- Helen Pai, American television writer, director, and producer

== See also ==
- Tommaso Bai or Baj (1636–1714), Italian composer WP:it
- Alfredo Bai (1913–1980), Italian sculptor
- Matt Bai (1968-), American political columnist
- Marcus Bai (1972-), Papua New Guinean rugby league footballer
- Alison Bai (born 1990), Australian tennis player.
