= Vietnamese ancestral house =

Temples for ancestors in Vietnamese culture

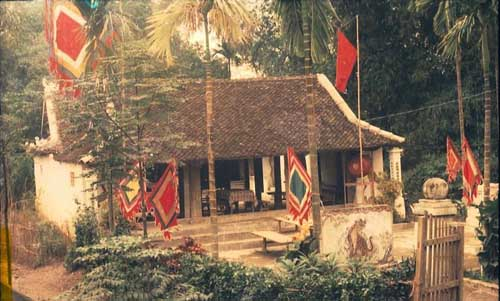
Nhà thờ họ Hoàng Trần

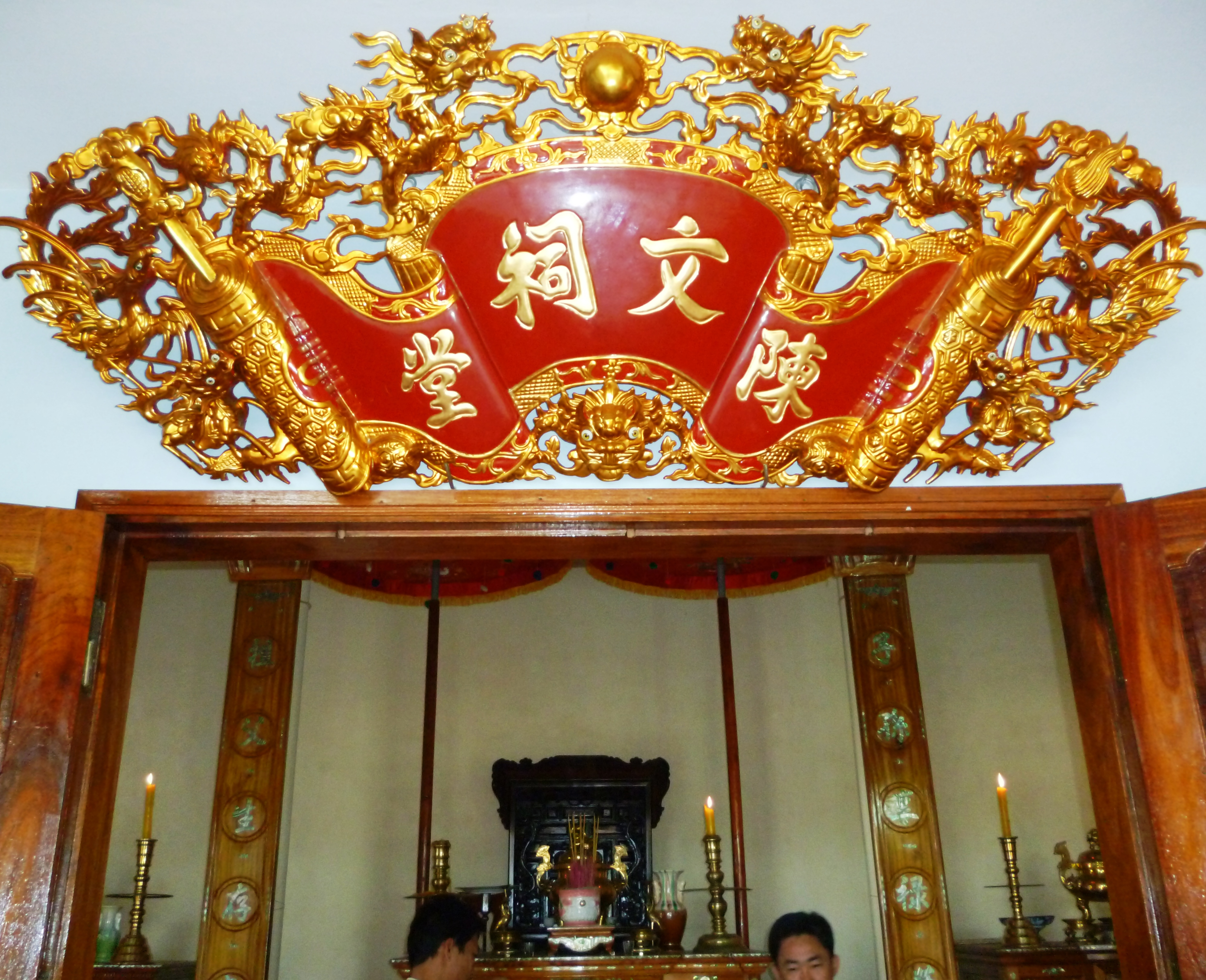
A lineage hall in Vietnam; the inscription reads "Trần Văn lineage temple" from right to left

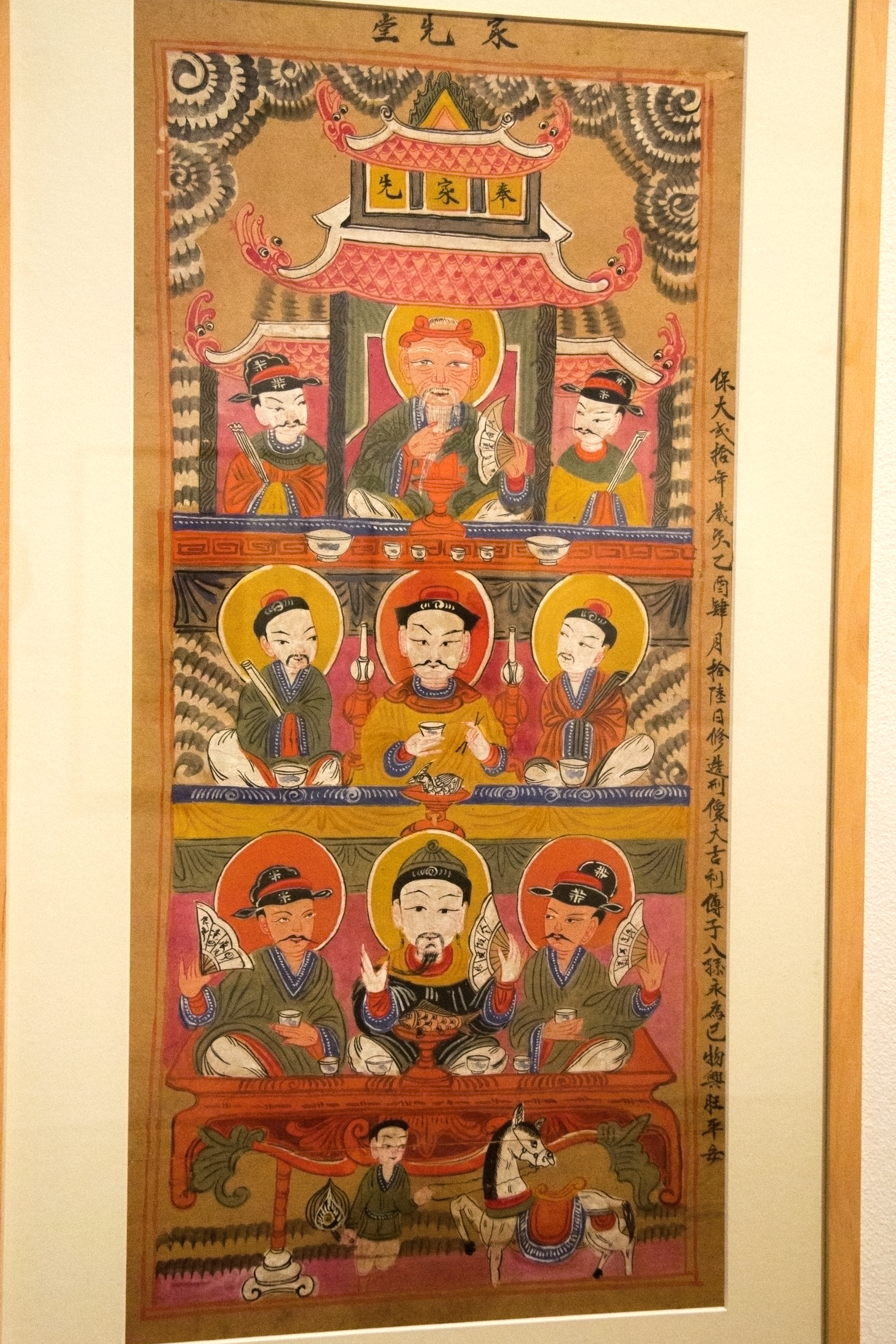
Hall of Ancestors (家先堂 Gia Tiên Đường). Ink and colours on paper. Northern Vietnam, 1945

An ancestral house (Vietnamese: nhà thờ họ, chữ Nôm: 茹悇𢩜 or Vietnamese: từ đường, chữ Hán: 祠堂) is a Vietnamese traditional place of worship of a clan or its branches which is established by male descendants of the paternal line. This type of worship place is most commonly seen in northern Vietnam as well as middle Vietnam.

After a clan is divided into branches by males of paternal line, the head of the main branch of a clan (trưởng tộc in Vietnamese) would lead the place where all clan members worship the primitive ancestor and store the primary genealogical book. This place would be called nhà thờ đại tôn (lit. ''primary lineage hall' or 'main clan ancestral house''). Other breaches of a clan would have their own nhà thờ họ in which the creators of these branches are worshipped; these nhà thờ họ are called nhà thờ chi họ (lit. 'branch of clan ancestral house').

The size and architecture of nhà thờ họ is depended on a clan's financial resources, donations from each of the male clan members and the political status of clan elders or patriarch. A nhà thờ họ is usually built follow the traditional 3 rooms house architecture in which the middle room is extended in the back so that a worship pedestal could be placed. The worship objects such as linh tọa (chair of the ghosts), giá gương (glass stand), and ngai (throne) will be placed in this worship pedestal. The ngai holds a vermilion-painted-and-gold-gilded box, which contains family genealogical book, and is covered by a piece of red cloth. This is the most sacred site of a nhà thờ họ, which people consider the gathering place of ancestors' soul.

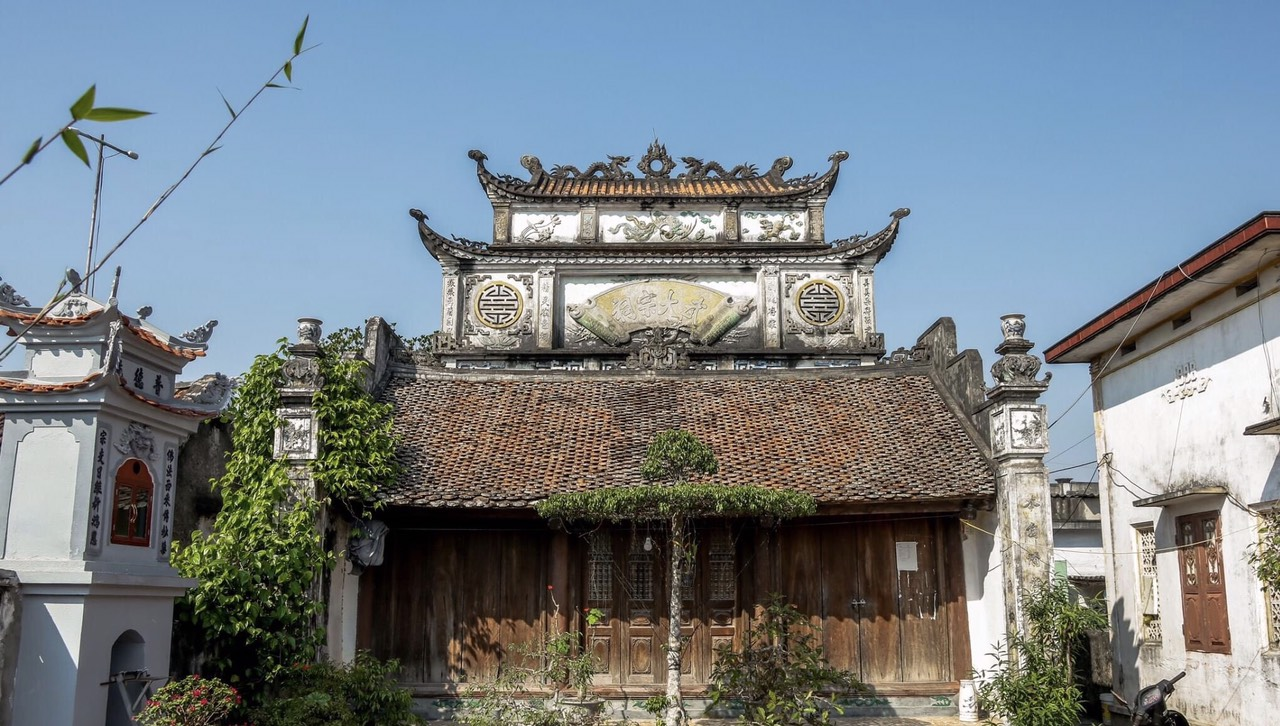
Nhà thờ họ Vũ

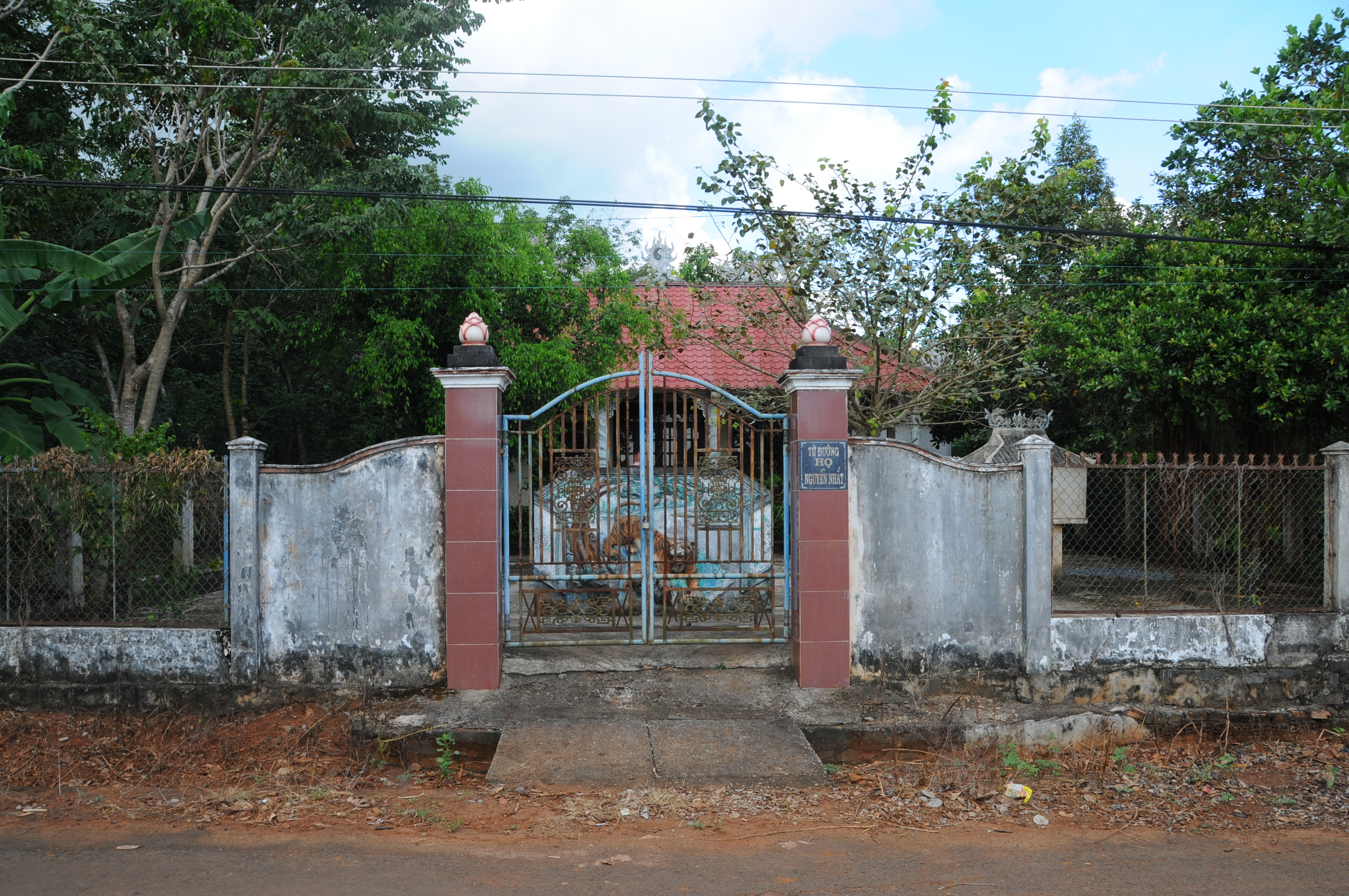
Nhà thờ họ Nguyễn Nhất, Bàu Lâm

An ancestral death anniversary will be held yearly at nhà thờ họ and this anniversary is usually used as an occasion to renew the relationship between living clan members.

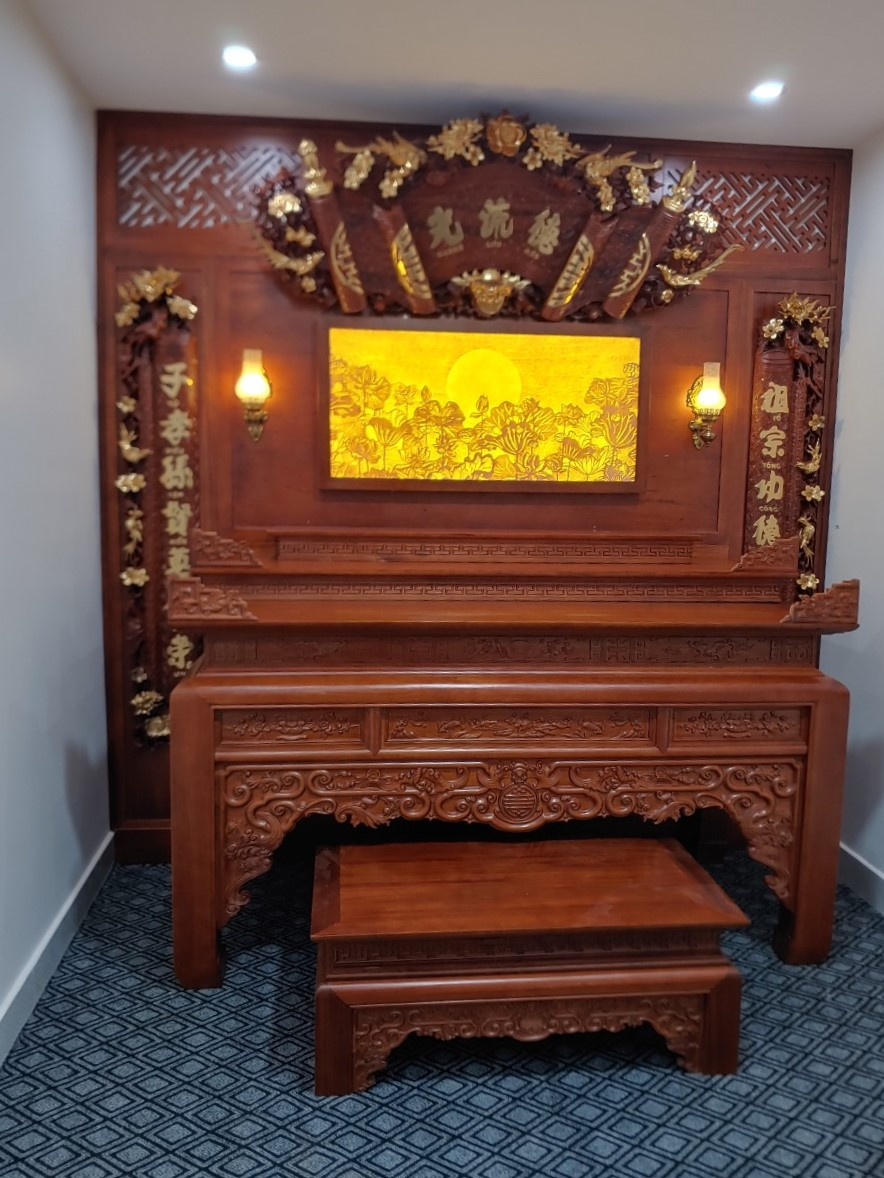
Empty ancestral house, before being decorated in honour of the dead
