= Bạch =

Bạch is a Vietnamese language surname, which means "white". The name is transliterated as Bai in Chinese, and as Baek (also often spelled Baik, Paek or Paik) in Korean. Bach may be an anglicized variation of Bạch. The surname may refer to:

- Bạch Liêu (1236–1315), Vietnamese official
- Bạch Hưng Khang (born 1942), Vietnamese scientist
- Bạch Thái Bưởi (1874–1932), Vietnamese businessman
- Bạch Xuân Nguyên (died 1833), Vietnamese official
- Trần Bạch Đằng (1926–2007), Vietnamese politician

== Other uses ==
- Bạch Hổ oil field
- Bạch Long Vĩ island
- Bạch Mã National Park
- Battle of Bạch Đằng (disambiguation)
- Trúc Bạch Lake
