= Place of worship =

Specially designed structure for use in worship

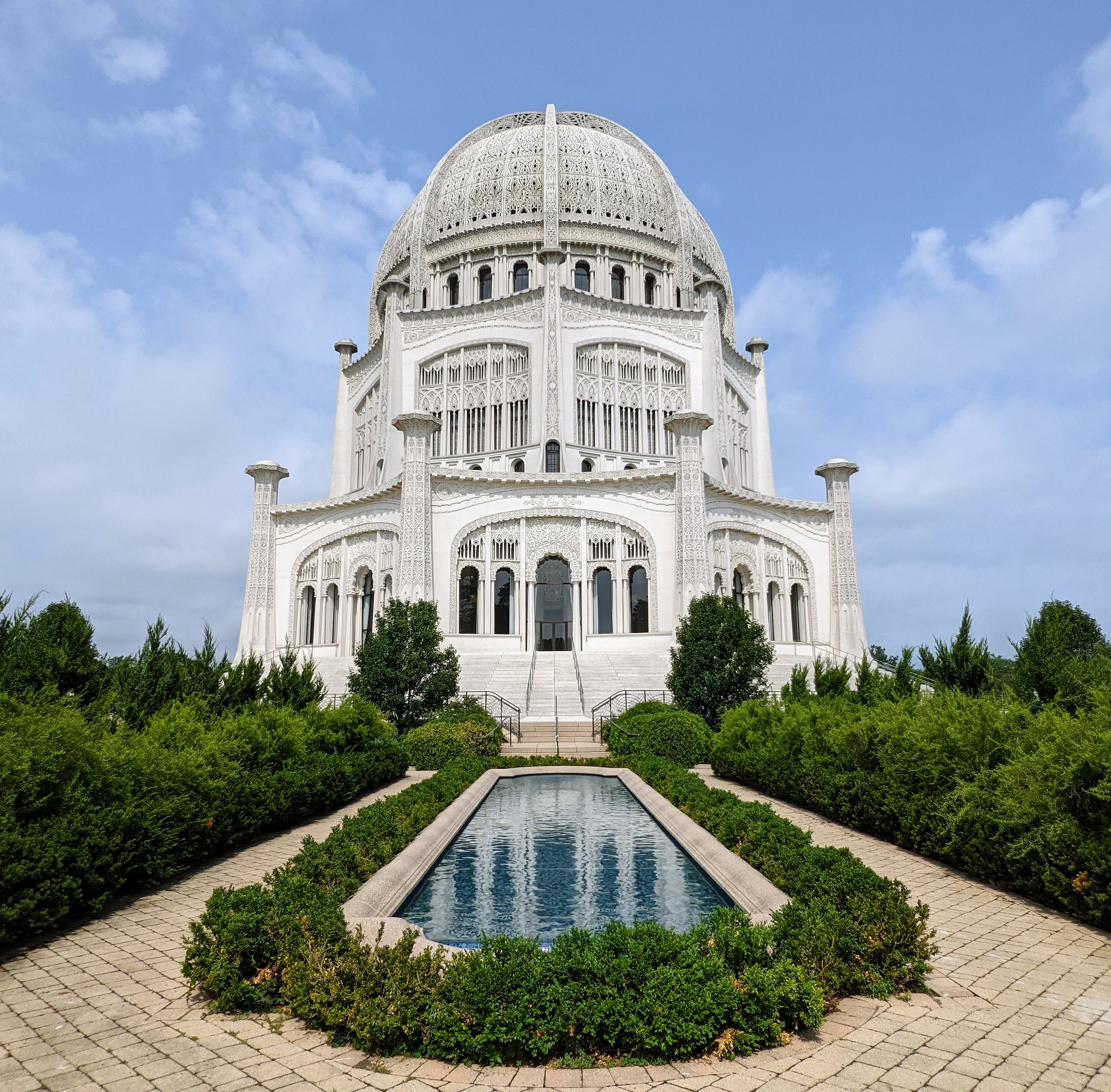
A Baháʼí House of Worship in Wilmette, Illinois, United States

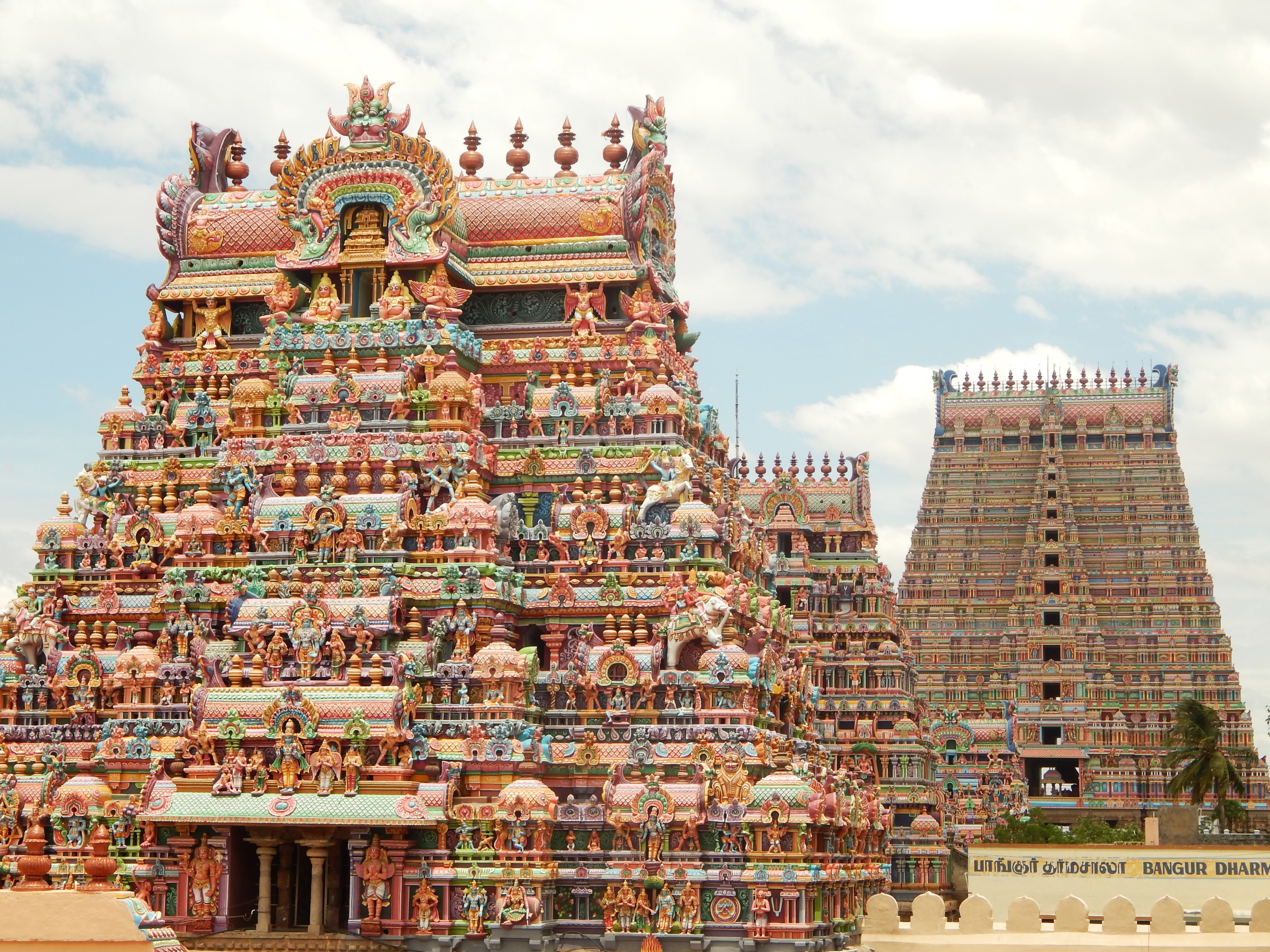
The Ranganathaswamy Temple is a Hindu temple in Srirangam, India

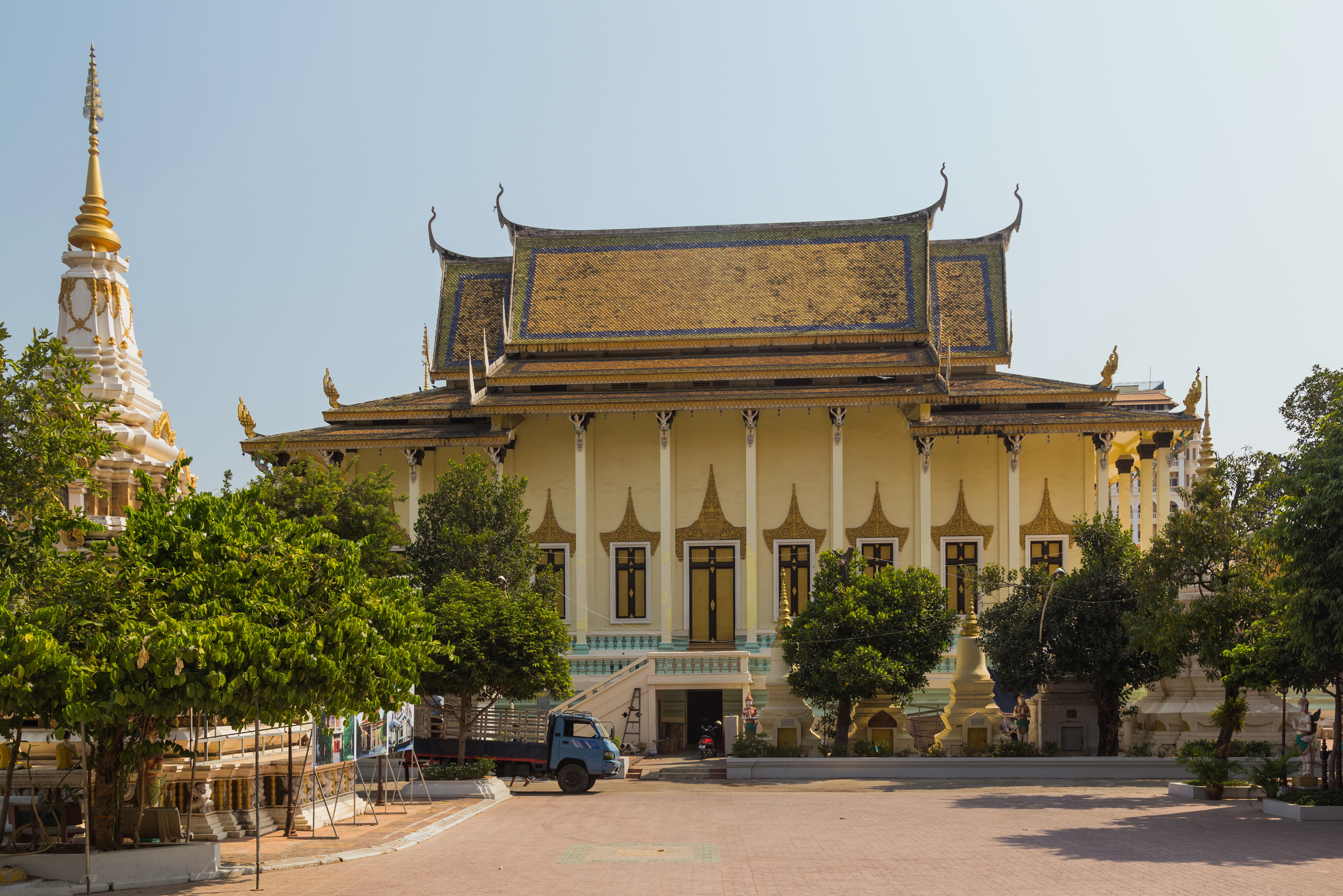
The Wat Botum is a Wat or Buddhist temple in Phnom Penh, Cambodia

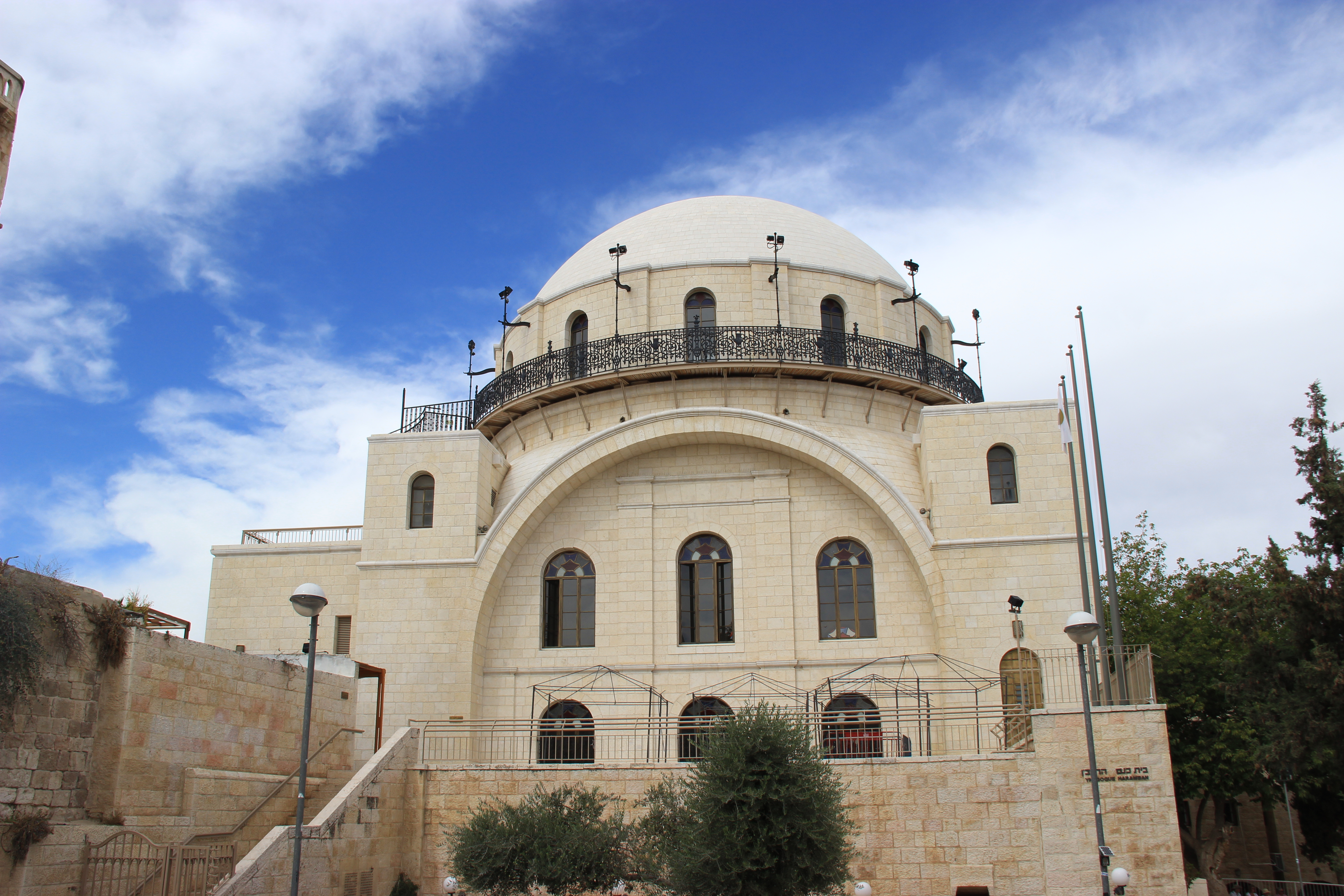
The Hurva Synagogue is a Jewish synagogue in Jerusalem, Israel

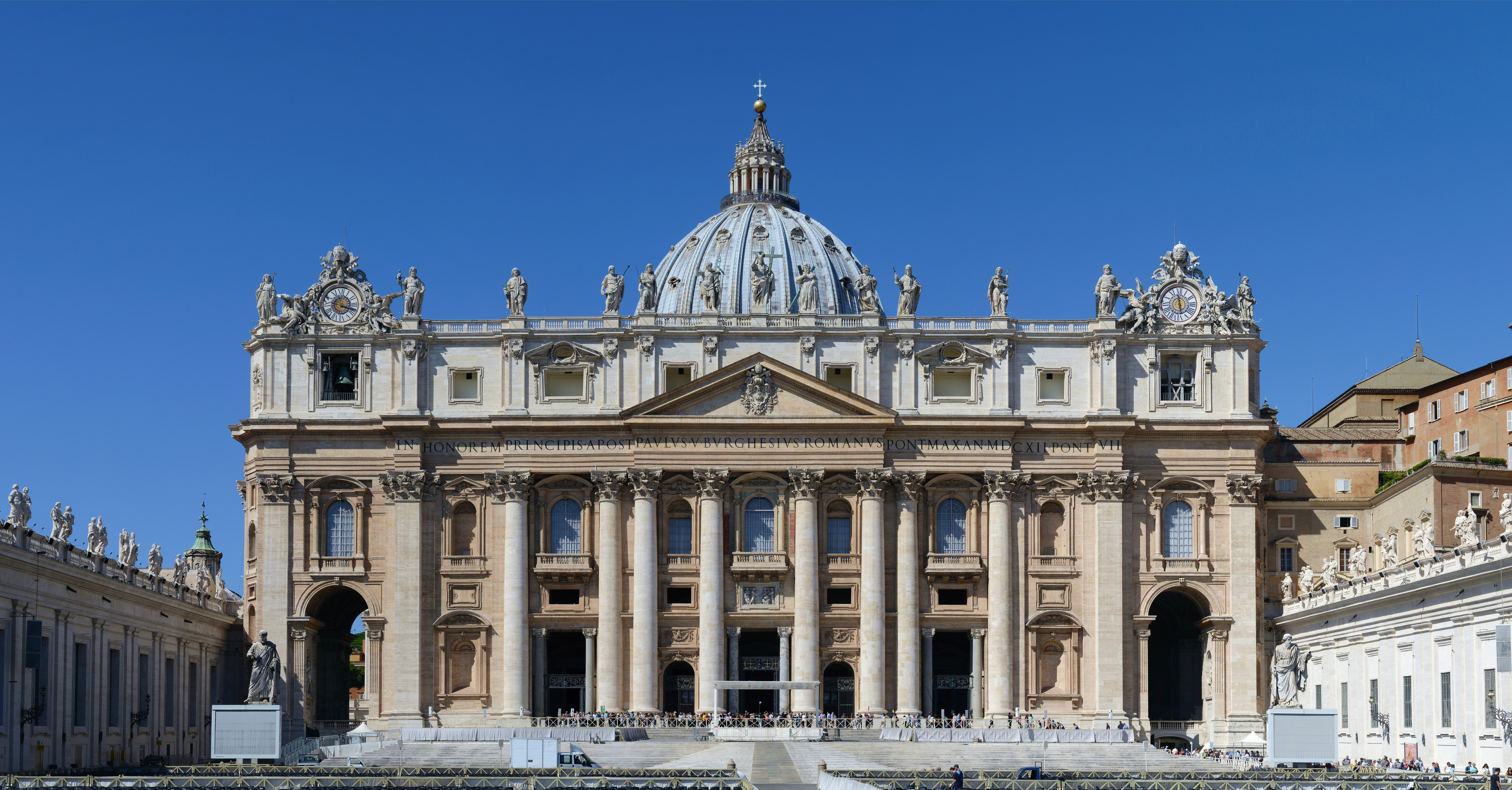
The St. Peter's Basilica is a church (place of worship for Christians) in Vatican City

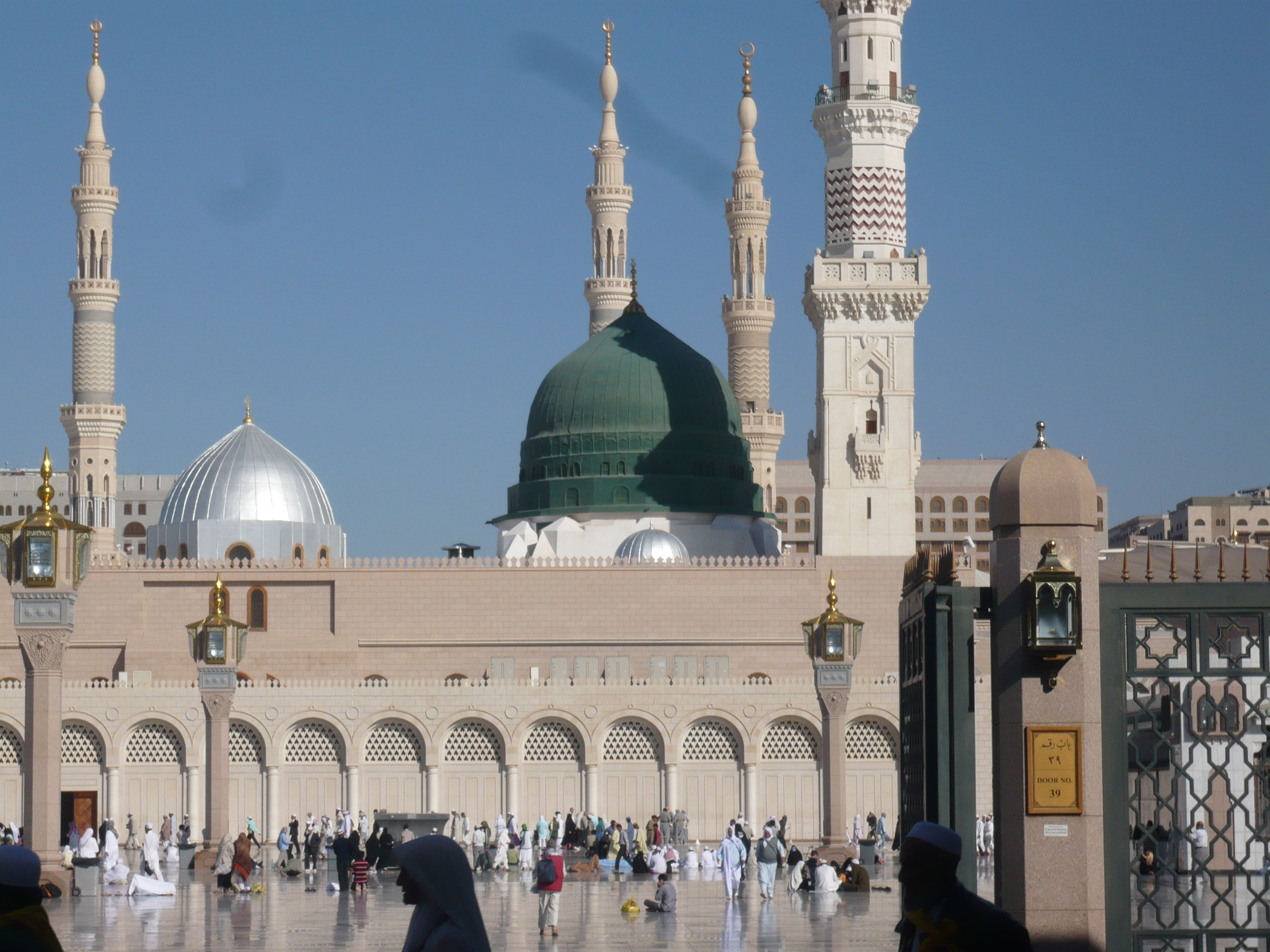
The Masjid al-Nabawī is a mosque, a place of worship for Muslims in Medina, Saudi Arabia

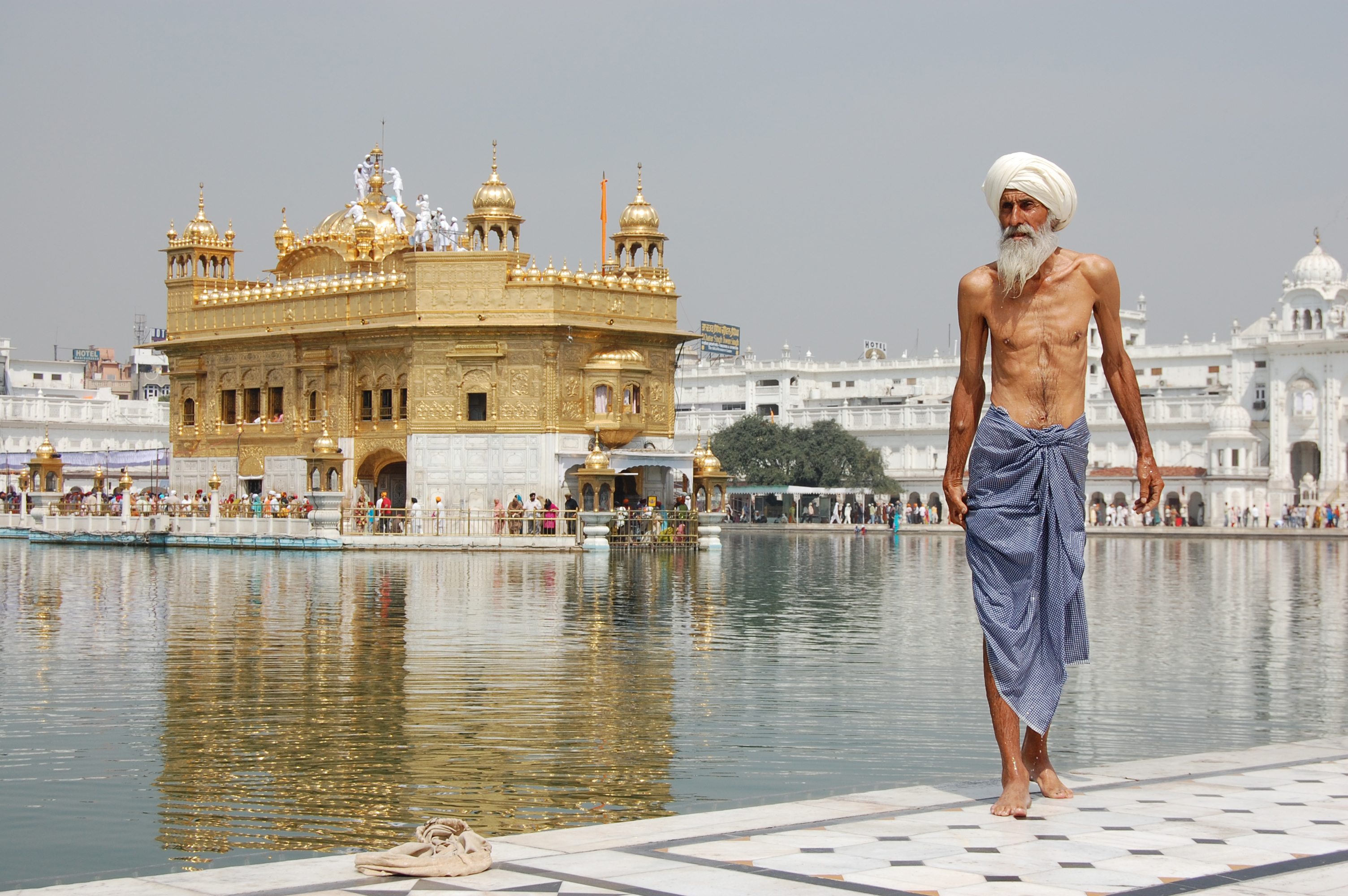
The Golden Temple is the holiest Sikh Gurdwara, located in Punjab, India

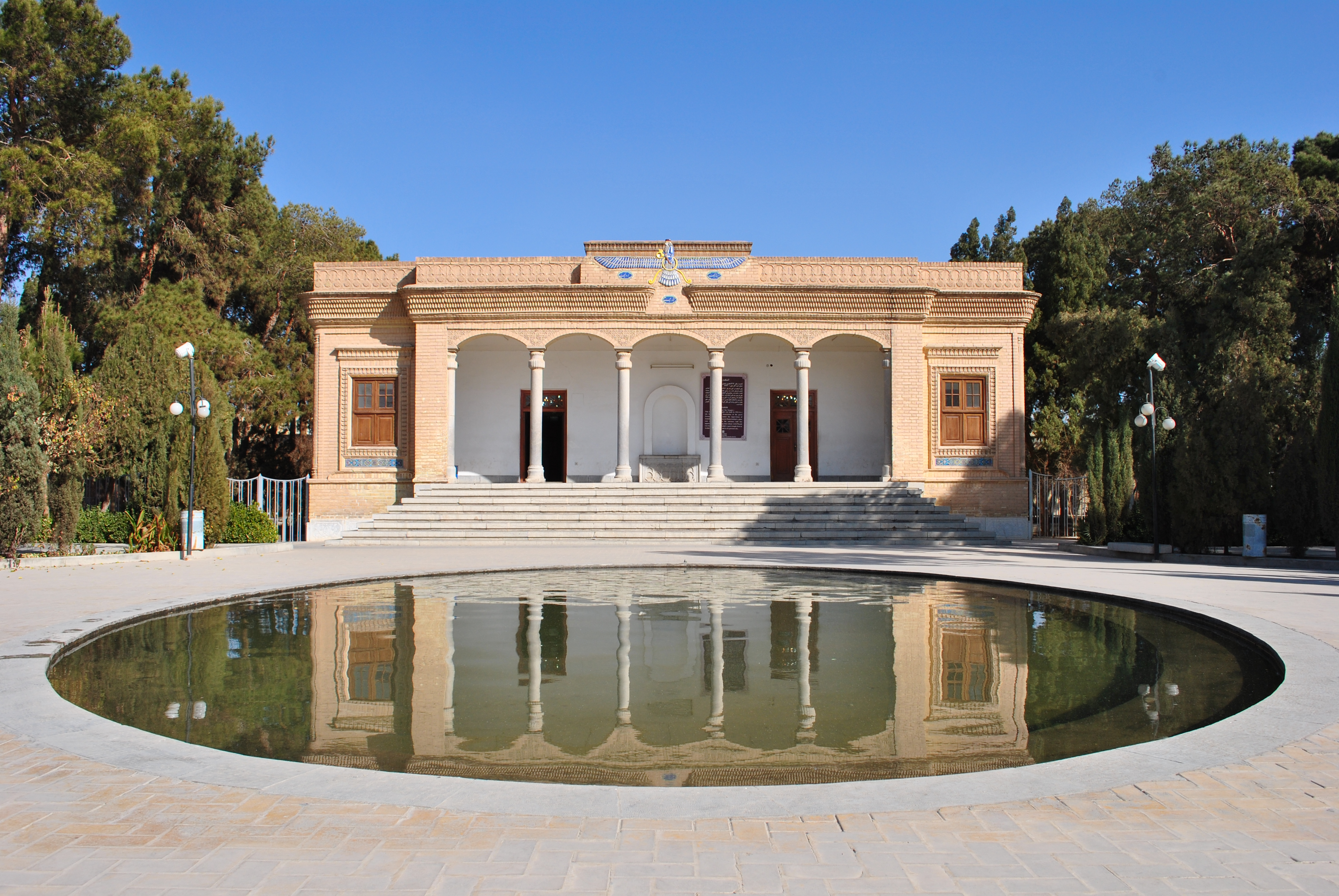
The Yazd Atash Behram is the Fire temple worship for the Zoroastrians in Yazd, Iran.

A place of worship is a specially designed structure or space where individuals or a group of people such as a congregation come to perform acts of devotion, veneration, or religious study. A building constructed or used for this purpose is sometimes called a house of worship. Temples, churches, mosques, and synagogues are main examples of structures created for worship. A monastery may serve both to house those belonging to religious orders and as a place of worship for visitors. Natural or topographical features may also serve as places of worship, and are considered holy or sacrosanct in some religions; the rituals associated with the Ganges river are an example in Hinduism.

Under international humanitarian law and the Geneva Conventions, religious buildings are offered special protection, similar to the protection guaranteed hospitals displaying the Red Cross or Red Crescent. These international laws of war bar firing upon or from a religious building.

Religious architecture expresses the religious beliefs, aesthetic choices, and economic and technological capacity of those who create or adapt it, and thus places of worship show great variety depending on time and place.

== Types ==
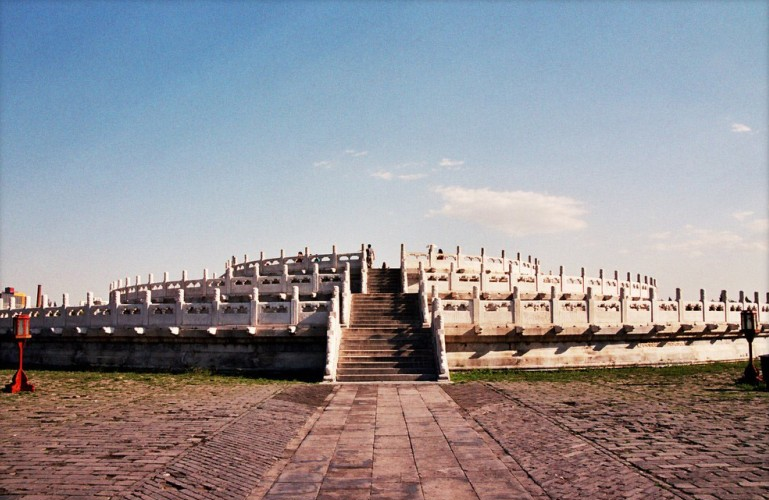
Sacred altar at the Temple of Heaven, Beijing

The contemporary places of worship include following types:

1. Sanctuary (shrine, altar and others sacrificial sites, sites for religious sacrifice and offering);
2. Temple (church, oratory, synagogue, mosque, mandir, pagoda);
3. Chapel, baptistery, and such;
4. Monastery
5. Reliquary (stupa, chasse);
6. Funeral places (place of ablutions and funeral services, cemetery, crematorium, columbarium).

== Buddhism ==
- Candi, Buddhist sanctuaries mostly built during the 1st to 21st centuries in the Indonesian Archipelago
- Chaitya, a Buddhist shrine that includes a stupa
- Jingū-ji, a religious complex in pre-Meiji Japan comprising a Buddhist temple and a local kami Shinto shrine
- Pagoda, a towerlike, multistory structure usually associated with Buddhist temple complexes of East and Southeast Asia.
- Vihara, a Buddhist monastery found abundantly in Bihar
- Wat, the name for a monastery temple in Cambodia and Thailand

== Christianity ==
The word church derives from the Greek ekklesia, meaning the called-out ones. Its original meaning is to refer to the body of believers, or the body of Christ. The word church is used to refer to a Christian place of worship by some Christian denominations, including Anglicans and Catholics. Other Christian denominations, including the Religious Society of Friends, Mennonites, Christadelphians, and some unitarians, object to the use of the word "church" to refer to a building, as they argue that this word should be reserved for the body of believers who worship there. Instead, these groups use words such as "Hall" to identify their places of worship or any building in use by them for the purpose of assembly.

- Basilica (Roman Catholic)
- Cathedral or minster (seat of a diocesan bishop within the Catholic, Orthodox and Anglican churches)
- Chapel ("Capel" in Welsh) – Presbyterian Church of Wales (Calvinistic Methodism), and some other denominations, especially non-conformist denominations. English law once reserved the term "church" to the Church of England. In Catholicism and Anglicanism, some smaller and "private" places of worship are called chapels.
- Church – Iglesia ni Cristo, Orthodox, Catholic, Protestant denominations
- Kirk (Scottish–cognate with church)
- Meeting House – Religious Society of Friends
- Meeting House – Christadelphians
- Meeting House and Temple – Mormons
  Latter-day Saints use meeting house and temple to denote two different types of buildings. Normal worship services are held in ward meeting houses (or chapels) while Mormon temples are reserved for special ordinances.
- Temple – French Protestants
  Protestant denominations installed in France in the early modern era use the word temple (as opposed to church, supposed to be Roman Catholic); some more recently built temples are called church.
- Orthodox temple – Orthodox Christianity (both Eastern and Oriental)
  an Orthodox temple is a place of worship with base shaped like Greek cross.
- Kingdom Hall – Jehovah's Witnesses may apply the term in a general way to any meeting place used for their formal meetings for worship, but apply the term formally to those places established by and for local congregations of up to 200 adherents. Their multi-congregation events are typically held at a meeting place termed Assembly Hall of Jehovah's Witnesses (or Christian Convention Center of Jehovah's Witnesses).

== Classical antiquity ==
=== Ancient Greece ===
- Greek temple (ναός), for the religions in ancient Greece

=== Ancient Rome ===
- Roman temple, for the religions of ancient Rome
- Mithraeum, for the Mithraic mysteries

== Hinduism ==
- Hindu temple (Mandir), Hinduism

A Hindu temple is a symbolic house, seat and body of god. It is a structure designed to bring human beings and gods together, using symbolism to express the ideas and beliefs of Hinduism. The symbolism and structure of a Hindu temple are rooted in Vedic traditions, deploying circles and squares. A temple incorporates all elements of Hindu cosmos—presenting the good, the evil and the human, as well as the elements of Hindu sense of cyclic time and the essence of life—symbolically presenting dharma, kama, artha, moksa, and karma.

== Islam ==
A mosque (Arabic: مسجد, romanized: masjid), literally meaning "place of prostration", is a place of worship for followers of Islam. There are strict and detailed requirements in Sunni jurisprudence (fiqh) for a place of worship to be considered a masjid, with places that do not meet these requirements regarded as musallas. There are stringent restrictions on the uses of the area formally demarcated as the mosque (which is often a small portion of the larger complex), and, in the Islamic Sharia law, after an area is formally designated as a mosque, it remains so until the Last Day.

Many mosques have elaborate domes, minarets, and prayer halls, in varying styles of architecture. Mosques originated on the Arabian Peninsula, but are now found in all inhabited continents. The mosque serves as a place where Muslims can come together for salat (صلاة ṣalāt, meaning "prayer") as well as a center for information, education, social welfare, and dispute settlement. The imam leads the congregation in prayer.

== Jainism ==
- Jain temple – Jainism

Derasar is a word used for a Jain temple in Gujarat and southern Rajasthan. Basadi is a Jain shrine or temple in Karnataka There are some guidelines to follow when one is visiting a Jain temple:

- Before entering the temple, one should bathe and wear freshly-washed clothes
- One should not be chewing any edibles
- One should try to keep as silent as possible inside the temple.
- Mobile phones should not be used in the temple.

== Judaism ==
- Synagogue – Judaism
  - Some synagogues, especially Reform synagogues, are called temples, but Orthodox and Conservative Judaism considers this inappropriate as it does not consider synagogues a replacement for the Temple in Jerusalem.

Some Jewish congregations use the Yiddish term 'shul' (from the same ancient Greek source as the English word "school") to describe their place of worship, or the Hebrew Beyt ha-Knesset (Hebrew בית הכנסת) meaning house of assembly.

== Mandaeism ==
- Mandi / Mashkhanna / Beth Manda – Mandaeism
  - A mandi or Beth Manda (Beit Manda or Bit Manda, 'house of knowledge') is a cultic hut and place of worship for followers of Mandaeism.

== Norse paganism ==
- Hof – Norse paganism

== Shinto ==
- Jinja – Shinto

== Sikhism ==
- Gurdwara – Sikhism

== Taoism ==
- Daoguan – Taoism

== Vietnamese ancestral worship ==
- Nhà thờ họ. Historically speaking Vietnamese people.

== Zoroastrianism ==
- Fire temple - All Zoroastrian temples fall into the Fire temple category.
  - Atash Behram
  - Agyari
    - Dadgah

== Religious precincts ==
A religious precinct is the area around a religious site, such as a temple, that is dedicated to religious purposes. A religious precinct may be defined by a physical enclosure, although this is not always the case. Religious precincts are an aspect of the spatiality of religion.

Religious precincts in urban settings often serve a mixture of religious and non-religious purposes. In some cases, a religious precinct may take up a substantial part of a city: the sacred precinct in Tenochtitlan encompassed 78 buildings.

In polytheistic faiths, a religious precinct may encompass sites dedicated to multiple gods. The ancient Roman sacred precinct at Altbachtal encompassed more than 70 distinct temples.

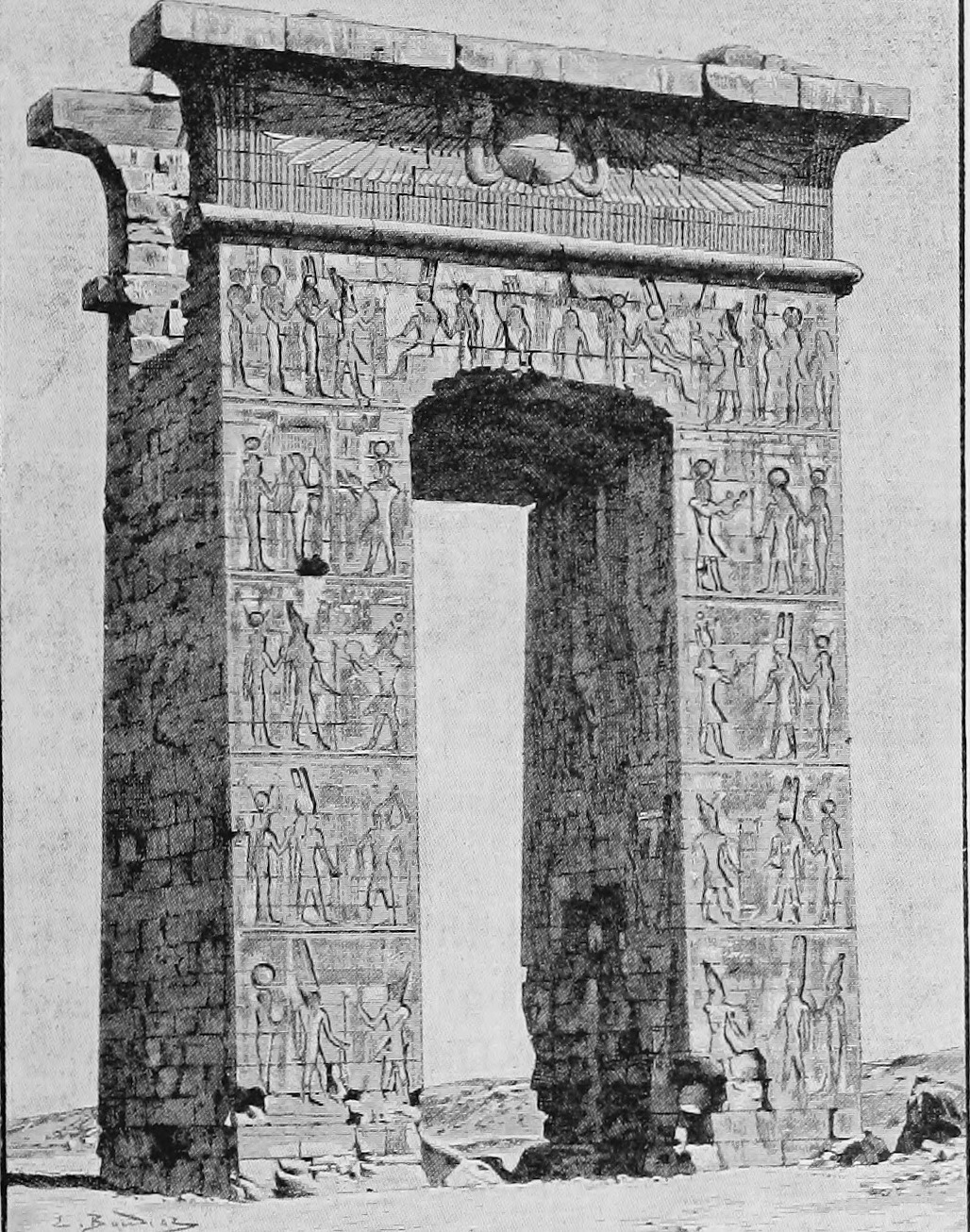
Gateway to the Precinct of Montu at the Karnak Temple Complex.

== See also ==
- Altar
- Bahá'í House of Worship
- Ibadat Khana
- Sacred space
- Shrine
- Religious architecture
- Reliquary
- List of largest church buildings in the world
- List of largest mosques in the world
- Temple
