= Giang Văn Minh =

Vietnamese officer

Giang Văn Minh 江文明
- In office 1630–1638

Personal details
- Born: 6 September 1573 Đường Lâm village, Mông Phụ commune, Cam Giá canton, Phúc Lộc district, Quốc Oai prefect, Sơn Tây region, Đại Việt
- Died: 1638 (aged 64–65) Beijing
- Occupation: Politician

Giang Văn Minh (chữ Hán: 江文明, 1573 - 1638) was a Vietnamese mandarin and envoy of the Revival Lê dynasty.

== Biography ==
Giang Văn Minh has the courtesy name Quốc Hoa (國華), posthumous name Văn Trung Tiên Sinh (文忠先生). He was born on 6 September 1573 in the village of Đường Lâm near Sơn Tây. In 1628, he ranked third (Thám hoa) in the Imperial examination. In 1631, he was promoted to be an officer of the Thái bộc tự.

== Mission to Ming dynasty and death ==
In December 1637, he was appointed by the Lê Emperor as chief envoy of a diplomatic mission to the court of the Ming dynasty. At the time of his mission, although the Mạc dynasty had fled to Cao Bang, the Ming still recognized both dynasties with the aim of prolonging the Lê-Mạc war. Giang Văn Minh's mission arrived in Yanjing (now Beijing) in 1638. When the audience came, the Ming court still hesitated to abolish recognition to the Mạc Dynasty. The Ming Emperor bestowed the embassy a couplet as follows:

銅柱至今苔已綠

Đồng trụ chí kim đài dĩ lục

The bronze pillars, now cloaked in verdant moss.

The bronze pillars refer to Ma Yuan's copper columns that were erected during Ma Yuan's suppression of the Trưng Sisters' uprising, implying that the Ming Dynasty was still controlling Dai Viet.

According to a 19th-century genealogy of the Giang Family (Vietnamese: Giang Thị gia phả, chữ Hán: 江氏家譜), when faced with such arrogance, Giang Văn Minh boldly responded with the sentence:

藤江自古血猶紅

Đằng Giang tự cổ huyết do hồng

Since ancient times, the waters of the Đằng River have run crimson with blood.

The line recalls the fact that the Vietnamese defeated various Chinese dynasties three times on the Bạch Đằng River. At that time, this couplet was considered a deep insult to the Ming Emperor, who ordered Giang Văn Minh to be killed and his belly cut open to see "how bold and daring the Annamese envoy was", then had his body embalmed with mercury and brought back to his country. When his body arrived at Thang Long Citadel, Emperor Lê Thần Tông and Lord Trịnh Tráng paid homage to his coffin. He was posthumously awarded the title of Left Minister of Public Works, and bestowed the sentence:

使不辱君命、可謂千古英雄。

Sứ bất nhục quân mệnh, khả vị thiên cổ anh hùng.

An envoy who does not disgrace his sovereign’s mandate may be hailed as a hero for the ages.

== Family ==
- Parents: Giang Văn Tâm (father)
- Wife: Đỗ Thị
- Children: 2 sons (Giang Văn Trạch, Giang Văn Tôn) and 7 daughters
