= Costanzo Picco =

Italian military officer and skier

Costanzo Picco (11 September 1917 – 9 December 2009), was an Italian military officer and skier. He served as an officer during World War II, first in the Italian 4th Army and later in the Italian resistance forces. After WWII, he participated in the 1948 Winter Olympics, and served as a commander in the Italian Mountain Warfare School.

== Biography ==
Picco, born in Borgo San Dalmazzo, served in the Italian 4th army as an officer during World War II. Amongst other missions, they fought in cooperation with the Giustizia e Libertà in the Valle Maira. He was taken prisoner during the war twice, once by the French and once by the Germans, but was able to flee both times. During his time in the Italian resistance time, he served as liaison officer between the partisans of justice and freedom in Piedmont and the allied troops. Further received decorations were the Bronze Medal of Military Valor (medaglia di Bronzo al Valor Militare) and the War Merit Cross (Croce al Merito di Guerra).

After the war he led the national team in the demonstration event of military patrol (a precursor to biathlon) in the 1948 Winter Olympics, and placed in fourth Advanced to the rank of a Capitano shortly after the Olympic games, he was transferred to the Italian mountain warfare school (Italian: Scuola Militare Alpina) in Aosta. 1951, he received his second Bronze Medal of Military Valor. In 1952 he became company commander of the 43rd Alpine Ski-battalion "Monte Cervino" (Italian: 43rd/Battaglione Alpini Sciatori "Monte Cervino“), a ski warfare company, in Aosta. He had the command over the 37th Alpine Company during its mission to carry and place the monumental statue of Christ (by Alfredo Bai) on the top of the Balmenhorn in 1955. From 1960 to 1965 he was commander of the Scuola Militare Alpina with the rank of a Tenente Colonnello.

Picco was the first president of the Associazione Sport Invernali Valle d'Aosta (ASIVA) and was advanced to General later. He was still active as a mountain guide of the Trenker-Trek before he died. He was married to Pia Greppi.
