= Leabhar Donn =

Manuscript

Leabhar Donn is a 15th-century genealogical manuscript, seemingly written and compiled on the border of counties Sligo and Leitrim. It was written in two periods: 1432–1441 and 1476–1482.

David Sellar, who was the Lord Lyon King of Arms in Scotland, concluded that it dates from the mid 15th century.

== Sources ==
- The Celebrated Antiquary, p. 156, Nollaig Ó Muraíle, Maynooth, 1996.
