= Sheldon Bach =

American psychologist (1925–2021)

- Born: May 18, 1925
- Died: June 15, 2021 (aged 96); New York City, New York, U.S.
- Scientific career
- Fields: Psychology; psychoanalysis
- Institutions: New York University

Sheldon Bach (May 18, 1925 – June 15, 2021) was an American psychologist and psychoanalyst based in New York City.

== Life and career ==
Bach was born in May 1925. He served in the European Theatre of Operations during World War II, then lived in Paris where he studied at the Sorbonne. He joined the Research Center for Mental Health at New York University in 1956, where he worked with George S. Klein and Leo Goldberger. He was Adjunct Clinical Professor of Psychology at the NYU Postdoctoral Program in Psychotherapy and Psychoanalysis and a Fellow of the International Psychoanalytical Association. Bach was born in Brooklyn in New York City. He died in New York City in June 2021 at the age of 96.

== Awards ==
In 2007 he was the recipient of the Heinz Hartmann Award for "outstanding contributions to the theory and practice of psychoanalysis." His Hartmann Lecture was published and reviewed the following year. In 2016 he was chosen by the Institute for Psychoanalytic Training and Research to give the Norbert Freedman Memorial Lecture at the New School. In that same year he gave the 51st Freud Lecture at the Institute for Psychoanalytic Education at NYU Medical School.

== Books ==
- "Chimeras and Other Writings: Selected Papers of Sheldon Bach". IPBooks, 2016, ISBN 978-0-99699-964-9
- The How-To Book for Students of Psychoanalysis and Psychotherapy. Karnac, 2011, ISBN 978-1-85575-887-2
- Getting from Here to There: Analytic Love, Analytic Process. Routledge, 2006, ISBN 978-0-88163-439-6
- Narcissistic States and the Therapeutic Process J. Aronson, 1985, ISBN 978-0-87668-893-9
- The Language of Perversion and the Language of Love. J. Aronson, 1994, ISBN 978-1-56821-262-3
