= Alfredo Bai =

Italian sculptor (1913–1980)

- Born: November 27, 1913; Turin
- Died: June 1980; Trana
- Known for: sculpture
- Notable work: "Cristo delle Vette"

Alfredo Bai (born Turin, November 27, 1913 – died Giaveno, June 1980) was an Italian sculptor.

Bai worked in the Arsenale di Torino, before he served as soldier in the guerrilla operation in the Valli di Lanzo during World War II. In the 1950s he discovered his vocation for sculpture, and realized different works in the whole Piedmontese region.

== "Cristo delle Vette" ==
His most significant work is certainly "Cristo delle Vette", a monumental statue in bronze of Jesus Christ, which was carried and placed by the 37th Alpini Company, commanded by Costanzo Picco, on the top of the Balmenhorn in the Pennine Alps on September 4, 1955. Before the enterprise of transport, the 360 centimeters sculpture was subdivided into eleven parts, the head alone weighed 54 kg.

== Gallery ==
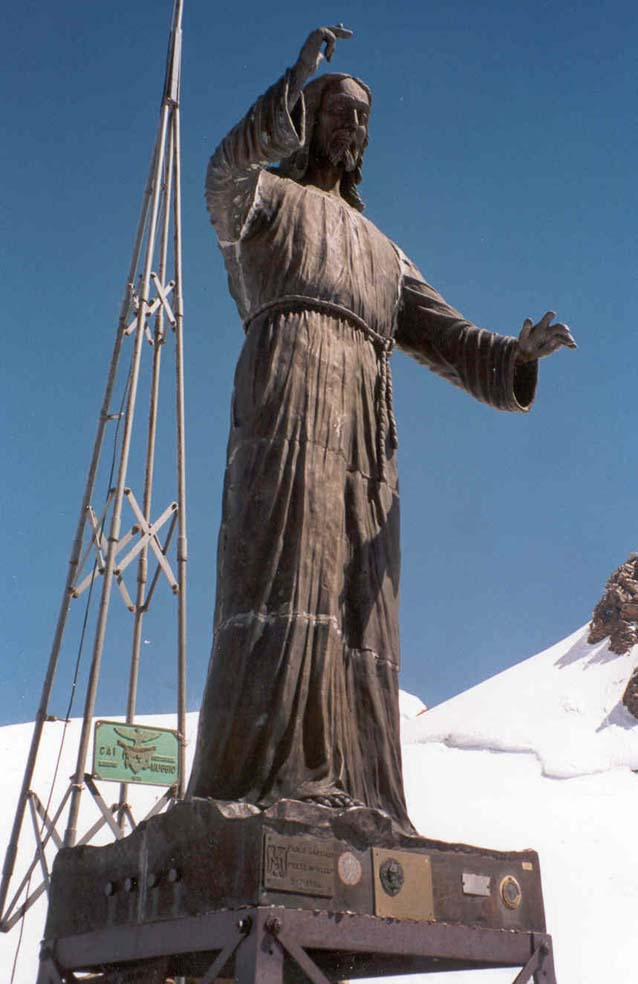
"Cristo delle Vette"
(Jesus Christ on top), Balmenhorn

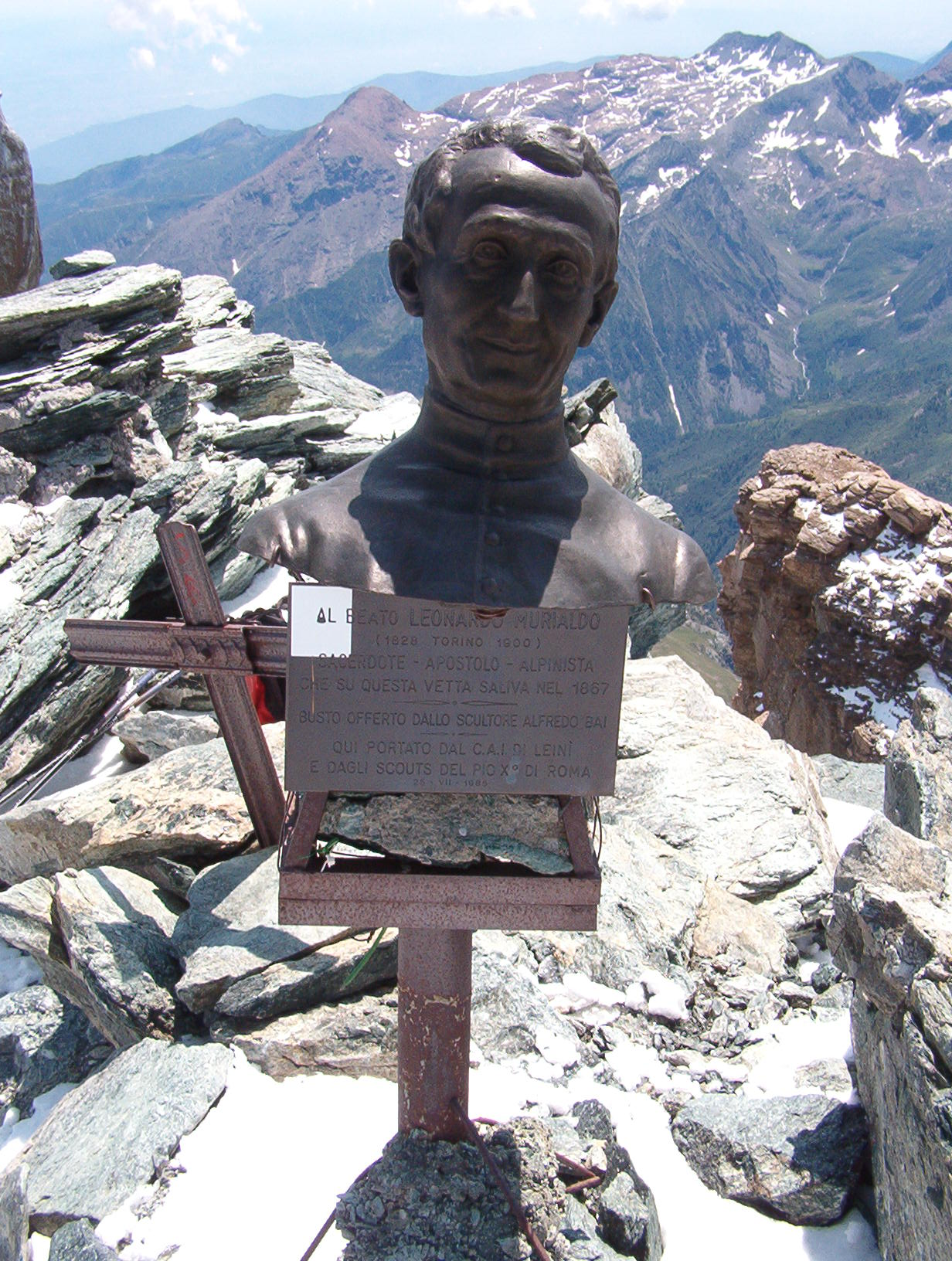
Saint Leonardo Murialdo bust, Uia di Ciamarella
