= Battle of Bạch Đằng =

There have been three Battles of Bạch Đằng recorded in the history of Vietnam:

- Battle of Bạch Đằng (938) between the Vietnamese commanded by Ngô Quyền and troops of the Southern Han. This battle resulted in the complete independence of Vietnam from Chinese rule.
- Battle of Bạch Đằng (981) between the Vietnamese army commanded by Lê Hoàn and troops of the Song dynasty.
- Battle of Bạch Đằng (1288) between the Vietnamese army commanded by Trần Hưng Đạo and troops of the Yuan dynasty, resulting in a Vietnamese victory.
