= List of keyboard and lute compositions by Johann Sebastian Bach =

Keyboard works (Klavierwerke) by Johann Sebastian Bach traditionally refers to Chapter 8 in the BWV catalogue or the fifth series of the New Bach Edition, both of which list compositions for a solo keyboard instrument like the harpsichord or the clavichord. Despite the fact that the organ is also a keyboard instrument, and that in Bach's time the distinction was not always made whether a keyboard composition was for organ or another keyboard instrument, Wolfgang Schmieder ranged organ compositions in a separate section of the Bach-Werke-Verzeichnis (Nos. 525-771). Also other compositions for keyboard, like compositions for lute-harpsichord and fortepiano were listed outside the "Klavierwerke" range by Schmieder. Lute works are in the range 995–1000, Chapter 9 in the BWV catalogue.

== Works for keyboard (BWV 772–994) ==
=== Inventions and Sinfonias (772–801) ===
- BWV 772 – Invention No. 1 in C major
- BWV 772a – Invention No. 1 in C major (alternative version of BWV 772)
- BWV 773 – Invention No. 2 in C minor
- BWV 774 – Invention No. 3 in D major
- BWV 775 – Invention No. 4 in D minor
- BWV 776 – Invention No. 5 in E♭ major
- BWV 777 – Invention No. 6 in E major
- BWV 778 – Invention No. 7 in E minor
- BWV 779 – Invention No. 8 in F major
- BWV 780 – Invention No. 9 in F minor
- BWV 781 – Invention No. 10 in G major
- BWV 782 – Invention No. 11 in G minor
- BWV 783 – Invention No. 12 in A major
- BWV 784 – Invention No. 13 in A minor
- BWV 785 – Invention No. 14 in B♭ major
- BWV 786 – Invention No. 15 in B minor
- BWV 787 – Sinfonia No. 1 in C major
- BWV 788 – Sinfonia No. 2 in C minor
- BWV 789 – Sinfonia No. 3 in D major
- BWV 790 – Sinfonia No. 4 in D minor
- BWV 791 – Sinfonia No. 5 in E♭ major
- BWV 792 – Sinfonia No. 6 in E major
- BWV 793 – Sinfonia No. 7 in E minor
- BWV 794 – Sinfonia No. 8 in F major
- BWV 795 – Sinfonia No. 9 in F minor
- BWV 796 – Sinfonia No. 10 in G major
- BWV 797 – Sinfonia No. 11 in G minor
- BWV 798 – Sinfonia No. 12 in A major
- BWV 799 – Sinfonia No. 13 in A minor
- BWV 800 – Sinfonia No. 14 in B♭ major
- BWV 801 – Sinfonia No. 15 in B minor

=== Four Duets from Clavier-Übung III (802–805) ===
- BWV 802 – Duet in E minor
- BWV 803 – Duet in F major
- BWV 804 – Duet in G major
- BWV 805 – Duet in A minor

=== English Suites (806–811) ===
- BWV 806 – English Suite No. 1 in A major
- BWV 807 – English Suite No. 2 in A minor
- BWV 808 – English Suite No. 3 in G minor
- BWV 809 – English Suite No. 4 in F major
- BWV 810 – English Suite No. 5 in E minor
- BWV 811 – English Suite No. 6 in D minor

=== French Suites (812–817) ===
- BWV 812 – French Suite No. 1 in D minor
- BWV 813 – French Suite No. 2 in C minor
- BWV 813a – French Suite No. 2 in C minor (alternative version of movement 5: Menuet)
- BWV 814 – French Suite No. 3 in B minor
- BWV 815 – French Suite No. 4 in E♭ major
- BWV 815a – French Suite No. 4 in E♭ major (alternative versions of several movements)
- BWV 816 – French Suite No. 5 in G major
- BWV 817 – French Suite No. 6 in E major

=== Miscellaneous suites (818–824) ===
- BWV 818 – Suite in A minor
- BWV 818a – Suite in A minor (alternative version of BWV 818)
- BWV 819 – Suite in E♭ major
- BWV 819a – Suite in E♭ major (alternative version of movement 1: Allemande from BWV 819)
- BWV 820 – Overture (Suite) in F major
- BWV 821 – Suite in B♭ major (doubtful)
- BWV 822 – Suite in G minor,
- BWV 823 – Suite in F minor
- BWV 824 – Suite in A major (spurious, composed by Georg Philipp Telemann, TWV 32:14)

=== Clavier-Übung I: Partitas for keyboard (825–830) ===
Clavier-Übung I, six Partitas for keyboard:

1. BWV 825 – Partita in B♭ major
2. BWV 826 – Partita in C minor
3. BWV 827 – Partita in A minor
4. BWV 828 – Partita in D major
5. BWV 829 – Partita in G major
6. BWV 830 – Partita in E minor

=== French Overture, from Clavier-Übung II (831) ===
- BWV 831 – Overture in the French Style, in B minor
- BWV 831a – Earlier version in C minor

=== Suites and suite movements (832–845) ===
- BWV 832 – Suite in A major
- BWV 833 – Prelude and Partita in F major
- BWV 834 – Allemande in C minor (doubtful)
- BWV 835 – Allemande in A minor (spurious, possibly by Johann Philipp Kirnberger)
- BWV 836 – Allemande in G minor (spurious, possibly by Pier Giuseppe Sandoni)
- BWV 837 – Allemande in G minor (spurious, possibly by Pier Giuseppe Sandoni)
- BWV 838 – Allemande and Courante in A major (spurious, possibly by Christoph Graupner, GWV 849)
- BWV 839 – Sarabande in G minor (doubtful)
- BWV 840 – Courante in G major (spurious, after the 2nd movement of Telemann's Ouverture in G major, TWV 32:13)
- BWV 841 – Minuet in G major (from the 1722 Notebook for Anna Magdalena Bach)
- BWV 842 – Minuet in G minor
- BWV 843 – Minuet in G major
- BWV 844 – Scherzo in D minor (doubtful)
- BWV 844a – Scherzo in D minor (alternative version of BWV 844, doubtful)
- BWV 845 – Gigue in F minor (doubtful)

=== The Well-Tempered Clavier (846–893) ===
The Well-Tempered Clavier, Book I:

1. BWV 846 – Prelude and Fugue in C major
  - BWV 846a – Prelude in C major (alternative version of BWV 846, only Prelude)
2. BWV 847 – Prelude and Fugue in C minor
  - BWV 847a – Prelude in C minor (alternative version of BWV 847, only Prelude)
3. BWV 848 – Prelude and Fugue in C♯ major
4. BWV 849 – Prelude and Fugue in C♯ minor
5. BWV 850 – Prelude and Fugue in D major
  - BWV 850a – Prelude in D major (alternative version of BWV 850, only Prelude)
6. BWV 851 – Prelude and Fugue in D minor
  - BWV 851a – Prelude in D minor (alternative version of BWV 851, only Prelude)
7. BWV 852 – Prelude and Fugue in E♭ major
8. BWV 853 – Prelude and Fugue in E♭ minor (The fugue of this work is in D♯ minor, the enharmonic key of E♭ minor)
9. BWV 854 – Prelude and Fugue in E major
10. BWV 855 – Prelude and Fugue in E minor
  - BWV 855a – Prelude in E minor (early version of the prelude of BWV 855), and Fughetta
11. BWV 856 – Prelude and Fugue in F major
12. BWV 857 – Prelude and Fugue in F minor
13. BWV 858 – Prelude and Fugue in F♯ major
14. BWV 859 – Prelude and Fugue in F♯ minor
15. BWV 860 – Prelude and Fugue in G major
16. BWV 861 – Prelude and Fugue in G minor
17. BWV 862 – Prelude and Fugue in A♭ major
18. BWV 863 – Prelude and Fugue in G♯ minor
19. BWV 864 – Prelude and Fugue in A major
20. BWV 865 – Prelude and Fugue in A minor
21. BWV 866 – Prelude and Fugue in B♭ major
22. BWV 867 – Prelude and Fugue in B♭ minor
23. BWV 868 – Prelude and Fugue in B major
24. BWV 869 – Prelude and Fugue in B minor

The Well-Tempered Clavier, Book II:

1. BWV 870 – Prelude and Fugue in C major
  - BWV 870a – Prelude and Fugue in C major (alternative version of BWV 870)
  - BWV 870b – Prelude in C major (alternative version of BWV 870)
2. BWV 871 – Prelude and Fugue in C minor
3. BWV 872 – Prelude and Fugue in C♯ major
  - BWV 872a – Prelude and Fugue in C♯ major (alternative version of BWV 872)
4. BWV 873 – Prelude and Fugue in C♯ minor
5. BWV 874 – Prelude and Fugue in D major
6. BWV 875 – Prelude and Fugue in D minor
  - BWV 875a – Prelude in D minor (alternative version of BWV 875)
7. BWV 876 – Prelude and Fugue in E♭ major
8. BWV 877 – Prelude and Fugue in D♯ minor
9. BWV 878 – Prelude and Fugue in E major
10. BWV 879 – Prelude and Fugue in E minor
11. BWV 880 – Prelude and Fugue in F major
12. BWV 881 – Prelude and Fugue in F minor
13. BWV 882 – Prelude and Fugue in F♯ major
14. BWV 883 – Prelude and Fugue in F♯ minor
15. BWV 884 – Prelude and Fugue in G major
16. BWV 885 – Prelude and Fugue in G minor
17. BWV 886 – Prelude and Fugue in A♭ major
18. BWV 887 – Prelude and Fugue in G♯ minor
19. BWV 888 – Prelude and Fugue in A major
20. BWV 889 – Prelude and Fugue in A minor
21. BWV 890 – Prelude and Fugue in B♭ major
22. BWV 891 – Prelude and Fugue in B♭ minor
23. BWV 892 – Prelude and Fugue in B major
24. BWV 893 – Prelude and Fugue in B minor

=== Preludes and fugues, toccatas, and fantasias (894–923) ===
Praeludium in A minor, BWV 922
Performed by Sylvia Kind

- BWV 894 – Prelude and Fugue in A minor
- BWV 895 – Prelude and Fugue in A minor
- BWV 896 – Prelude and Fugue in A major
- BWV 897 – Prelude and Fugue in A minor (doubtful; prelude possibly by Cornelius Heinrich Dretzel, fugue possibly by Wilhelm Friedemann Bach)
- BWV 898 – Prelude and Fugue in B♭ major on the name B-A-C-H (doubtful)
- BWV 899 – Prelude and Fughetta in D minor
- BWV 900 – Prelude and Fughetta in E minor
- BWV 901 – Prelude and Fughetta in F major
- BWV 902 – Prelude and Fughetta in G major
- BWV 902a – Prelude in G major (alternative version of BWV 902)
- BWV 903 – Chromatic Fantasia and Fugue in D minor
- BWV 903a – Chromatic Fantasia in D minor (alternative version of BWV 903)
- BWV 904 – Fantasia and Fugue in A minor
- BWV 905 – Fantasia and Fugue in D minor (doubtful)
- BWV 906 – Fantasia and Fugue in C minor (fugue unfinished)
- BWV 907 – Fantasia and Fughetta in B♭ major (doubtful)
- BWV 908 – Fantasia and Fughetta in D major (doubtful)
- BWV 909 – Concerto and Fugue in C minor (doubtful)
- BWV 910 – Toccata in F♯ minor
- BWV 911 – Toccata in C minor
- BWV 912 – Toccata in D major
- BWV 913 – Toccata in D minor
- BWV 914 – Toccata in E minor
- BWV 915 – Toccata in G minor
- BWV 916 – Toccata in G major
- BWV 917 – Fantasia in G minor
- BWV 918 – Fantasia in C minor
- BWV 919 – Fantasia in C minor (doubtful, possibly by Johann Bernhard Bach)
- BWV 920 – Fantasia in G minor (doubtful)
- BWV 921 – Prelude in C minor
- BWV 922 – Prelude (Fantasia) in A minor
- BWV 923 – Prelude in B minor (possibly by Wilhelm Hieronymus Pachelbel)
- BWV 923a – Prelude (Toccatina No. 3; variant of BWV 923; doubtful)

=== Nine Little Preludes from Wilhelm Friedemann Bach's Klavierbüchlein (924–932) ===
Indicated as "Neun kleine Präludien aus dem Klavierbüchlein für Wilhelm Friedemann Bach" (nine little preludes from the keyboard-booklet for Wilhelm Friedemann Bach) in the Bach-Werke Verzeichnis:

1. BWV 924 – Prelude in C major (Klavierbüchlein No. 2: "Praeambulum")
  BWV 924a – Prelude in C major (Klavierbüchlein No. 26: "Preludium ex c♮"; variant version of BWV 924 probably by W. F. Bach, BR‑WFB A 44)
2. BWV 925 – Prelude in D major (Klavierbüchlein No. 27: "Praeludium ex d♮"; possibly by W. F. Bach, BR‑WFB A 45)
3. BWV 926 – Prelude in D minor (Klavierbüchlein No. 4: "Praeludium")
4. BWV 927 – Prelude in F major (Klavierbüchlein No. 8: "Praeambulum")
5. BWV 928 – Prelude in F major (Klavierbüchlein No. 10: "Praeludium")
6. BWV 929 – Prelude in G minor (Klavierbüchlein No. 48^{e}: Trio for a Minuet by Gottfried Heinrich Stölzel)
7. BWV 930 – Prelude in G minor (Klavierbüchlein No. 9: "Praeambulum")
8. BWV 931 – Prelude in A minor (Klavierbüchlein No. 29: "Praeludium"; possibly by W. F. Bach, BR‑WFB A 47)
9. BWV 932 – Prelude in E minor (incomplete; Klavierbüchlein No. 28: "Praeludium ex e♭"; possibly by W. F. Bach, BR‑WFB A 46)

=== Six Little Preludes (933–938) ===
An 18th-century set of short preludes by Johann Sebastian Bach:

1. BWV 933 – Little Prelude in C major
2. BWV 934 – Little Prelude in C minor
3. BWV 935 – Little Prelude in D minor
4. BWV 936 – Little Prelude in D major
5. BWV 937 – Little Prelude in E major
6. BWV 938 – Little Prelude in E minor

=== Five Little Preludes (939–943) ===
Five short preludes found in the manuscript P 804 (collection of Johann Peter Kellner):

1. BWV 939 – Prelude in C major
2. BWV 940 – Prelude in D minor
3. BWV 941 – Prelude in E minor
4. BWV 942 – Prelude in A minor
5. BWV 943 – Prelude in C major

=== Fugues and fughettas (944–962) ===
- BWV 944 – Fantasia and Fugue in A minor
- BWV 945 – Fugue in E minor (doubtful, possibly by Christoph Graupner)
- BWV 946 – Fugue in C major
- BWV 947 – Fugue in A minor
- BWV 948 – Fugue in D minor
- BWV 949 – Fugue in A major
- BWV 950 – Fugue in A major on a theme by Tomaso Albinoni
- BWV 951 – Fugue in B minor on a theme by Tomaso Albinoni
- BWV 951a – Fugue in B minor (alternative version of BWV 951)
- BWV 952 – Fugue in C major
- BWV 953 – Fugue in C major
- BWV 954 – Fugue in B♭ major on a theme by Johann Adam Reincken
- BWV 955 – Fugue in B♭ major
- BWV 956 – Fugue in E minor (doubtful)
- BWV 957 – Machs mit mir, Gott, nach deiner Güt (chorale prelude for organ in the Neumeister Collection, previously listed as Fugue in G major)
- BWV 958 – Fugue in A minor (doubtful)
- BWV 959 – Fugue in A minor
- BWV 960 – Fugue in E minor (incomplete and doubtful)
- BWV 961 – Fughetta in C minor
- BWV 962 – Fughetta in E minor (spurious, composed by Johann Georg Albrechtsberger)

=== Sonatas and sonata movements (963–970) ===
- BWV 963 – Sonata in D major
- BWV 964 – Sonata in D minor (arrangement of Sonata No. 2 for solo violin, BWV 1003 – doubtful)
- BWV 965 – Sonata in A minor (after Johann Adam Reincken's Hortus Musicus, Nos. 1–5)
- BWV 966 – Sonata in C major (after Johann Adam Reincken's Hortus Musicus, Nos. 11–15)
- BWV 967 – Sonata in A minor (one movement only, arrangement of a chamber sonata by unknown composer)
- BWV 968 – Adagio in G major (after movement 1 of Sonata No. 3 for solo violin, BWV 1005 – doubtful)
- BWV 969 – Andante in G minor (doubtful)
- BWV 970 – Presto in D minor (spurious, composed by Wilhelm Friedemann Bach)

=== Italian Concerto, from Clavier-Übung II (971) ===
- BWV 971 – Italian Concerto, in F major

=== Keyboard arrangements of concerti by other composers (972–987) ===
Concerto in D major, BWV 972 – 2. Largo
Performed on a harpsichord by Gérard Janot

- BWV 972 – Concerto in D major (arrangement of Antonio Vivaldi's Concerto Op. 3/9, RV230)
- BWV 973 – Concerto in G major (arrangement of Antonio Vivaldi's Concerto Op. 7/8, RV299)
- BWV 974 – Concerto in D minor (arrangement of Alessandro Marcello's Oboe Concerto in D minor)
- BWV 975 – Concerto in G minor (arrangement of Antonio Vivaldi's Concerto Op. 4/6, RV316a)
- BWV 976 – Concerto in C major (arrangement of Antonio Vivaldi's Concerto Op. 3/12, RV265)
- BWV 977 – Concerto in C major (source unknown, possibly a concerto by Benedetto Marcello)
- BWV 978 – Concerto in F major (arrangement of Antonio Vivaldi's Concerto Op. 3/3, RV310)
- BWV 979 – Concerto in B minor (recently identified as Vivaldi's Concerto RV Anh. 10, now RV 813)
- BWV 980 – Concerto in G major (arrangement of Antonio Vivaldi's Violin Concerto in B♭ Major, RV 381)
- BWV 981 – Concerto in C minor (possibly an arrangement of Benedetto Marcello's concerto Op. 1/2)
- BWV 982 – Concerto in B♭ major (arrangement of Prince Johann Ernst of Saxe-Weimar's concerto Op. 1/1)
- BWV 983 – Concerto in G minor (source unknown)
- BWV 984 – Concerto in C major (arrangement of a Prince Johann Ernst concerto) (see BWV 595 for organ version)
- BWV 985 – Concerto in G minor (arrangement of a Georg Philipp Telemann violin concerto)
- BWV 986 – Concerto in G major (arrangement of a concerto attributed to Georg Philipp Telemann)
- BWV 987 – Concerto in D minor (arrangement of Prince Johann Ernst's concerto Op. 1/4)

=== Variations and miscellaneous pieces for keyboard (988–994) ===
- BWV 988 – Goldberg Variations (published as Fourth Clavier-Übung)
- BWV 989 – Aria variata alla maniera italiana, in A minor
- BWV 990 – Sarabande con Partite in C major (loosely adapted from the overture for "Bellérophon" (1679) by Jean-Baptiste Lully – doubtful)
- BWV 991 – Air with variations in C minor (unfinished, from the 1722 Notebook for Anna Magdalena Bach)
- BWV 992 – Capriccio sopra la lontananza del suo fratello dilettissimo ("Capriccio on the departure of the Beloved Brother"), in B♭ major
- BWV 993 – Capriccio in E major
- BWV 994 – Applicatio in C major (from the Clavier-Büchlein for Wilhelm Friedemann Bach)

== Works for solo lute (BWV 995–1000) ==
- BWV 995 – Suite in G minor (transcription of Cello Suite No. 5, BWV 1011)
- BWV 996 – Suite in E minor (most probably intended for lute-harpsichord)
- BWV 997 – Suite in C minor
- BWV 998 – Prelude, Fugue and Allegro in E♭ major
- BWV 999 – Prelude in C minor
- BWV 1000 – Fugue in G minor (transcription of Fuga (Allegro) from Violin Sonata No. 1 in G minor, BWV 1001)

== Works for keyboard and lute in the eighth and ninth chapters of the Bach-Werke-Verzeichnis (1998) ==
Legend to the table
column		content
1	BWV	Bach-Werke-Verzeichnis (lit. 'Bach-works-catalogue'; BWV) numbers. Anhang (Annex; Anh.) numbers are indicated as follows: preceded by I: in Anh. I (lost works) of BWV^{1} (1950 first edition of the BWV); preceded by II: in Anh. II (doubtful works) of BWV^{1}; preceded by III: in Anh. III (spurious works) of BWV^{1}; preceded by N: new Anh. numbers in BWV^{2} (1990) and/or BWV^{2a} (1998)
2	^{2a}	Section in which the composition appears in BWV^{2a}: Chapters of the main catalogue indicated by Arabic numerals (1-13); Anh. sections indicated by Roman numerals (I–III); Reconstructions published in the NBE indicated by "R"
3	Date	Date associated with the completion of the listed version of the composition. Exact dates (e.g. for most cantatas) usually indicate the assumed date of first (public) performance. When the date is followed by an abbreviation in brackets (e.g. JSB for Johann Sebastian Bach) it indicates the date of that person's involvement with the composition as composer, scribe or publisher.
4	Name	Name of the composition: if the composition is known by a German incipit, that German name is preceded by the composition type (e.g. cantata, chorale prelude, motet, ...)
5	Key	Key of the composition
6	Scoring	See scoring table below for the abbreviations used in this column
7	BG	Bach Gesellschaft-Ausgabe (BG edition; BGA): numbers before the colon indicate the volume in that edition. After the colon an Arabic numeral indicates the page number where the score of the composition begins, while a Roman numeral indicates a description of the composition in the Vorwort (Preface) of the volume.
8	NBE	New Bach Edition (German: Neue Bach-Ausgabe, NBA): Roman numerals for the series, followed by a slash, and the volume number in Arabic numerals. A page number, after a colon, refers to the "Score" part of the volume. Without such page number, the composition is only described in the "Critical Commentary" part of the volume. The volumes group Bach's compositions by genre: 1. Cantatas (Vol. 1–34: church cantatas grouped by occasion; Vol. 35–40: secular cantatas; Vol. 41: Varia); 2. Masses, Passions, Oratorios (12 volumes); 3. Motets, Chorales, Lieder (4 volumes); 4. Organ Works (11 volumes); 5. Keyboard and Lute Works (14 volumes); 6. Chamber Music (5 volumes); 7. Orchestral Works (7 volumes); 8. Canons, Musical Offering, Art of Fugue (3 volumes); 9. Addenda (approximately 7 volumes)
9	Additional info	may include: "after" – indicating a model for the composition; "by" – indicating the composer of the composition (if different from Johann Sebastian Bach); "in" – indicating the oldest known source for the composition; "pasticcio" – indicating a composition with parts of different origin; "see" – composition renumbered in a later edition of the BWV; "text" – by text author, or, in source; Provenance of standard texts and tunes, such as Lutheran hymns and their chorale melodies, Latin liturgical texts (e.g. Magnificat) and common tunes (e.g. Folia), are not usually indicated in this column. For an overview of such resources used by Bach, see individual composition articles, and overviews in, e.g., Chorale cantata (Bach)#Bach's chorale cantatas, List of chorale harmonisations by Johann Sebastian Bach#Chorale harmonisations in various collections and List of organ compositions by Johann Sebastian Bach#Chorale Preludes.
10	BD	Bach Digital Work page

Legend for abbreviations in "Scoring" column
Voices (see also SATB)
a	A	b	B	s	S	t	T	v			V	
alto (solo part)	alto (choir part)	bass (solo part)	bass (choir part)	soprano (solo part)	soprano (choir part)	tenor (solo part)	tenor (choir part)	voice (includes parts for unspecified voices or instruments as in some canons)			vocal music for unspecified voice type	
Winds and battery (bold = soloist)
Bas	Bel	Cnt	Fl	Hn	Ob	Oba	Odc	Tai	Tbn	Tdt	Tmp	Tr
bassoon (can be part of Bc, see below)	bell(s) (musical bells)	cornett, cornettino	flute (traverso, flauto dolce, piccolo, flauto basso)	natural horn, corno da caccia, corno da tirarsi, lituo	oboe	oboe d'amore	oboe da caccia	taille	trombone	tromba da tirarsi	timpani	tromba (natural trumpet, clarino trumpet)
Strings and keyboard (bold = soloist)
Bc		Hc	Kb	Lu	Lw	Org	Str	Va	Vc	Vdg	Vl	Vne
basso continuo: Vdg, Hc, Vc, Bas, Org, Vne and/or Lu		harpsichord	keyboard (Hc, Lw, Org or clavichord)	lute, theorbo	Lautenwerck (lute-harpsichord)	organ (/man. = manualiter, without pedals)	strings: Vl I, Vl II and Va	viola(s), viola d'amore, violetta	violoncello, violoncello piccolo	viola da gamba	violin(s), violino piccolo	violone, violone grosso

Background colours
Colour	Meaning
green	extant or clearly documented partial or complete manuscript (copy) by Bach and/or first edition under Bach's supervision
yellow	extant or clearly documented manuscript (copy) or print edition, in whole or in part, by close relative, i.e. brother (J. Christoph), wife (A. M.), son (W. F. / C. P. E. / J. C. F. / J. Christian) or son-in-law (Altnickol)
orange-brown	extant or clearly documented manuscript (copy) by close friend and/or pupil (Kellner, Krebs, Kirnberger, Walther, ...), or distant family member

Keyboard and lute works in Chapters 8 and 9 of BWV^{2a}
BWV	^{2a}	Date	Name	Key	Scoring	BG	NBE	Additional info	BD
**8.**	Keyboard compositions (see also: List of solo keyboard compositions by Johann Sebastian Bach)								Up ↑
772	8.	1720-01-22; 1725-01-22	Inventions and Sinfonias No. 1 – Invention No. 1 = WFB No. 32: Preamb. 1	C maj.	Keyboard	3: 1; 45^{1}: 221	V/5: 48; V/3: 2	→ BWV 772a	00902
772a	8.	1720-01-22; 1725-01-22	Inventions and Sinfonias No. 1a – Invention No. 1a	C maj.	Keyboard	3: 342	V/3: 4	after BWV 772	00903
773	8.	1720-01-22; 1725-01-22	Inventions and Sinfonias No. 2 – Invention No. 2 = WFB No. 46: Preamb. 15	C min.	Keyboard	3: 2; 45^{1}: 223	V/5: 76; V/3: 6		00904
774	8.	1720-01-22; 1725-01-22	Inventions and Sinfonias No. 3 – Invention No. 3 = WFB No. 45: Preamb. 14	D maj.	Keyboard	3: 3; 45^{1}: 223	V/5: 74; V/3: 8		00905
775	8.	1720-01-22; 1725-01-22	Inventions and Sinfonias No. 4 – Invention No. 4 = WFB No. 33: Preamb. 2	D min.	Keyboard	3: 4; 45^{1}: 221	V/5: 50; V/3: 10		00906
776	8.	1720-01-22; 1725-01-22	Inventions and Sinfonias No. 5 – Invention No. 5 = WFB No. 44: Preamb. 13	E♭ maj.	Keyboard	3: 6; 45^{1}: 222	V/5: 72; V/3: 12		00907
777	8.	1720-01-22; 1725-01-22	Inventions and Sinfonias No. 6 – Invention No. 6 = WFB No. 43: Preamb. 12	E maj.	Keyboard	3: 7; 45^{1}: 222	V/5: 70; V/3: 14		00908
778	8.	1720-01-22; 1725-01-22	Inventions and Sinfonias No. 7 – Invention No. 7 = WFB No. 34: Preamb. 3	E min.	Keyboard	3: 9; 45^{1}: 221	V/5: 52; V/3: 16		00909
779	8.	1720-01-22; 1725-01-22	Inventions and Sinfonias No. 8 – Invention No. 8 = WFB No. 35: Preamb. 4	F maj.	Keyboard	3: 10; 45^{1}: 221	V/5: 54; V/3: 18		00910
780	8.	1720-01-22; 1725-01-22	Inventions and Sinfonias No. 9 – Invention No. 9 = WFB No. 42: Preamb. 11	F min.	Keyboard	3: 11; 45^{1}: 222	V/5: 68; V/3: 20		00911
781	8.	1720-01-22; 1725-01-22	Inventions and Sinfonias No. 10 – Invention No. 10 = WFB No. 36: Preamb. 5	G maj.	Keyboard	3: 12; 45^{1}: 221	V/5: 56; V/3: 22		00912
782	8.	1720-01-22; 1725-01-22	Inventions and Sinfonias No. 11 – Invention No. 11 = WFB No. 41: Preamb. 10	G min.	Keyboard	3: 13; 45^{1}: 222	V/5: 66; V/3: 24		00913
783	8.	1720-01-22; 1725-01-22	Inventions and Sinfonias No. 12 – Invention No. 12 = WFB No. 40: Preamb. 9	A maj.	Keyboard	3: 14; 45^{1}: 222	V/5: 64; V/3: 26		00914
784	8.	1720-01-22; 1725-01-22	Inventions and Sinfonias No. 13 – Invention No. 13 = WFB No. 37: Preamb. 6	A min.	Keyboard	3: 15; 45^{1}: 221	V/5: 58; V/3: 28		00915
785	8.	1720-01-22; 1725-01-22	Inventions and Sinfonias No. 14 – Invention No. 14 = WFB No. 39: Preamb. 8	B♭ maj.	Keyboard	3: 16; 45^{1}: 222	V/5: 62; V/3: 30		00916
786	8.	1720-01-22; 1725-01-22	Inventions and Sinfonias No. 15 – Invention No. 15 = WFB No. 38: Preamb. 7	B min.	Keyboard	3: 18; 45^{1}: 222	V/5: 60; V/3: 32		00917
787	8.	1720-01-22; 1725-01-22	Sinfonias and Inventions No. 16 – Sinfonia No. 1 = WFB No. 49: Fantasia 1	C maj.	Keyboard	3: 19; 45^{1}: 227	V/5: 90; V/3: 34		00918
788	8.	1720-01-22; 1725-01-22	Sinfonias and Inventions No. 17 – Sinfonia No. 2 = WFB No. 63: Fantasia 15	C min.	Keyboard	3: 20; 45^{1}: 231	V/5: 118; V/3: 36		00919
789	8.	1720-01-22; 1725-01-22	Sinfonias and Inventions No. 18 – Sinfonia No. 3 = WFB No. 62: Fantasia 14	D maj.	Keyboard	3: 22; 45^{1}: 230	V/5: 116; V/3: 38		00920
790	8.	1720-01-22; 1725-01-22	Sinfonias and Inventions No. 19 – Sinfonia No. 4 = WFB No. 50: Fantasia 2	D min.	Keyboard	3: 23; 45^{1}: 227	V/5: 92; V/3: 40		00921
791	8.	1720-01-22; 1725-01-22	Sinfonias and Inventions No. 20 – Sinfonia No. 5 = WFB No. 61: Fantasia 13	E♭ maj.	Keyboard	3: 24; 45^{1}: 230	V/5: 114; V/3: 42	→ BWV 791a	00922
791a	8.	1723	Sinfonias and Inventions No. 20a – Sinfonia No. 5a	E♭ maj.	Keyboard		V/3: 44, 80	after BWV 791	00923
792	8.	1720-01-22; 1725-01-22	Sinfonias and Inventions No. 21 – Sinfonia No. 6 = WFB No. 60: Fantasia 12	E maj.	Keyboard	3: 26; 45^{1}: 229	V/5: 112; V/3: 46		00924
793	8.	1720-01-22; 1725-01-22	Sinfonias and Inventions No. 22 – Sinfonia No. 7 = WFB No. 51: Fantasia 3	E min.	Keyboard	3: 28; 45^{1}: 227	V/5: 94; V/3: 48		00925
794	8.	1720-01-22; 1725-01-22	Sinfonias and Inventions No. 23 – Sinfonia No. 8 = WFB No. 52: Fantasia 4	F maj.	Keyboard	3: 29; 45^{1}: 227	V/5: 96; V/3: 50		00926
795	8.	1720-01-22; 1725-01-22	Sinfonias and Inventions No. 24 – Sinfonia No. 9 = WFB No. 59: Fantasia 11	F min.	Keyboard	3: 30; 45^{1}: 229	V/5: 110; V/3: 52		00927
796	8.	1720-01-22; 1725-01-22	Sinfonias and Inventions No. 25 – Sinfonia No. 10 = WFB No. 53: Fantasia 5	G maj.	Keyboard	3: 32; 45^{1}: 228	V/5: 98; V/3: 54		00928
797	8.	1720-01-22; 1725-01-22	Sinfonias and Inventions No. 26 – Sinfonia No. 11 = WFB No. 58: Fantasia 10	G min.	Keyboard	3: 34; 45^{1}: 229	V/5: 108; V/3: 56		00929
798	8.	1720-01-22; 1725-01-22	Sinfonias and Inventions No. 27 – Sinfonia No. 12 = WFB No. 57: Fantasia 9	A maj.	Keyboard	3: 36; 45^{1}: 229	V/5: 106; V/3: 58		00930
799	8.	1720-01-22; 1725-01-22	Sinfonias and Inventions No. 28 – Sinfonia No. 13 = WFB No. 54: Fantasia 6	A min.	Keyboard	3: 38; 45^{1}: 228	V/5: 100; V/3: 60		00931
800	8.	1720-01-22; 1725-01-22	Sinfonias and Inventions No. 29 – Sinfonia No. 14 = WFB No. 56: Fantasia 8	B♭ maj.	Keyboard	3: 40; 45^{1}: 228	V/5: 104; V/3: 62		00932
801	8.	1720-01-22; 1725-01-22	Sinfonias and Inventions No. 30 – Sinfonia No. 15 = WFB No. 55: Fantasia 7	B min.	Keyboard	3: 41; 45^{1}: 228	V/5: 102; V/3: 64		00933
802	8.	1739	Duet No. 1 from Clavier-Übung III	E min.	Organ	3: 242	IV/4: 92		00934
803	8.	1739	Duet No. 2 from Clavier-Übung III	F maj.	Organ	3: 245	IV/4: 96		00935
804	8.	1739	Duet No. 3 from Clavier-Übung III	G maj.	Organ	3: 248	IV/4: 99		00936
805	8.	1739	Duet No. 4 from Clavier-Übung III	A min.	Organ	3: 251	IV/4: 102		00937
806	8.	1714–1723	English Suites, No. 1	A maj.	Keyboard	45^{1}: 3; 13^{2}: 3	V/7: 2		00938
806a	8.	1714–1717	English Suites, No. 1a	A maj.	Keyboard		V/7: 116		00939
807	8.	1725 or earlier	English Suites, No. 2	A min.	Keyboard	45^{1}: 16; 13^{2}: 16	V/7: 20		00940
808	8.	1725 or earlier	English Suites, No. 3	G min.	Keyboard	45^{1}: 30; 13^{2}: 30	V/7: 38		00941
809	8.	1725 or earlier	English Suites, No. 4	F maj.	Keyboard	45^{1}: 41; 13^{2}: 41	V/7: 54		00942
810	8.	1725 or earlier	English Suites, No. 5	E min.	Keyboard	45^{1}: 53; 13^{2}: 53	V/7: 70		00943
811	8.	1725 or earlier	English Suites, No. 6	D min.	Keyboard	45^{1}: 68; 13^{2}: 68	V/7: 90		00944
812	8.	1722 or earlier	Notebook A. M. Bach (1722) No. 1 – French Suites, No. 1	D min.	Keyboard	43^{2}: VI	V/4: 3		00945
812	8.	1722 or earlier	Notebook A. M. Bach (1725) No. 30 – French Suites, No. 1	D min.	Keyboard	43^{2}: 40	V/4: 109		00945
812	8.	1722 or earlier	French Suites, No. 1 – Version A (Altnickol)	D min.	Keyboard	45^{1}: 89; 13^{2}: 89	V/8: 2		00945
812	8.	1722 or earlier	French Suites, No. 1 – Version B (early version)	D min.	Keyboard	45^{1}: 89; 13^{2}: 89	V/8: 64		00945
813	8.	c. 1722–1725	Notebook A. M. Bach (1722) No. 2 – French Suites, No. 2	C min.	Keyboard	43^{2}: VI	V/4: 10, 42		00946
813	8.	c. 1722–1725	Notebook A. M. Bach (1725) No. 31 – French Suites, No. 2	C min.	Keyboard	43^{2}: 44	V/4: 116		00946
813	8.	c. 1722–1725	French Suites, No. 2 – Version A (Altnickol)	C min.	Keyboard	45^{1}: 94; 13^{2}: 94	V/8: 10		00946
813	8.	c. 1722–1725	French Suites, No. 2 – Version B (early version)	C min.	Keyboard	45^{1}: 94; 13^{2}: 94	V/8: 72		00946
813	8.	c. 1722–1725	French Suites, No. 2 – Version B (early version)	C min.	Keyboard	36: 236	V/8: 72		00946
814	8.	c. 1722–1725	Notebook A. M. Bach (1722) No. 3 – French Suites, No. 3	B min.	Keyboard	43^{2}: VII	V/4: 16, 43	→ BWV 814a	00948
814	8.	c. 1722–1725	French Suites, No. 3 – Version A (Altnickol)	B min.	Keyboard	45^{1}: 100; 13^{2}: 100	V/8: 20	→ BWV 814a	00948
814	8.	c. 1722–1725	French Suites, No. 3 – Version B (early version)	B min.	Keyboard	45^{1}: 100; 13^{2}: 100	V/8: 82	→ BWV 814a	00948
814a	8.	c. 1720–1739	French Suites, No. 3 – Variant	B min.	Keyboard	45^{1}: 100; 36: 237; 13^{2}: 100	V/8: 166	after BWV 814/1–/5, 929, 814/7	00949
815	8.	c. 1722–1725	Notebook A. M. Bach (1722) No. 4 French Suites, No. 4	E♭ maj.	Keyboard	43^{2}: VII	V/4: 23	→ BWV 815a	00950
815	8.	c. 1722–1725	French Suites, No. 4 – Version A (Altnickol)	E♭ maj.	Keyboard	45^{1}: 106; 13^{2}: 106	V/8: 30	→ BWV 815a	00950
815	8.	c. 1722–1725	French Suites, No. 4 – Version B (early version)	E♭ maj.	Keyboard	45^{1}: 106; 13^{2}: 106	V/8: 92	→ BWV 815a	00950
815	8.	c. 1722–1725	French Suites, No. 4 – Version B (early version)	E♭ maj.	Keyboard	36: 236	V/8: 92	→ BWV 815a	00950
815a	8.	c. 1722–1725 or later	French Suites, No. 4 – Variant	E♭ maj.	Keyboard	36: 234; 45^{1}: 106; 13^{2}: 108	V/8: 176	after BWV 815/1–/5	00951
816	8.	c. 1724–1725	Notebook A. M. Bach (1722) No. 5 French Suites, No. 5	G maj.	Keyboard	43^{2}: VII	V/4: 30		00952
816	8.	c. 1724–1725	French Suites, No. 5 – Version A (Altnickol)	G maj.	Keyboard	45^{1}: 112; 13^{2}: 112	V/8: 40		00952
816	8.	c. 1724–1725	French Suites, No. 5 – Version B (early version)	G maj.	Keyboard	45^{1}: 112; 13^{2}: 112	V/8: 102		00952
817	8.	c.1725 or later	French Suites, No. 6 – Version A (Altnickol)	E maj.	Keyboard	45^{1}: 120; 13^{2}: 120	V/8: 52		00953
817	8.	c.1725 or later	French Suites, No. 6 – Version B (early version)	E maj.	Keyboard	45^{1}: 120; 13^{2}: 120	V/8: 114		00953
818	8.	1720–1722	Suite for keyboard (early version)	A min.	Keyboard	36: 3	V/8: 129		00954
818a	8.	after 1721	Suite for keyboard (later version)	A min.	Keyboard	36: 213	V/8: 146		00955
819	8.	before 1726	Suite for keyboard (early version)	E♭ maj.	Keyboard	36: 8	V/8: 136		00956
819a	8.	1725–1728	Suite for keyboard (later version)	E♭ maj.	Keyboard	36: 217	V/8: 156		00957
820	8.	1705–1713	Suite (Ouverture) for keyboard	F maj.	Keyboard	36: 14	V/10: 43		00958
822	8.		Suite for keyboard	G min.	Keyboard		V/10: 68	after unknown model?	00960
823	8.	before 1727	Suite for keyboard	F min.	Keyboard	36: 229	V/10: 50		00961
825	8.	1725–1726	Partita No. 1 from Clavier-Übung I	B♭ maj.	Keyboard	3: 46	V/1: 2		00963
826	8.	1725–1727	Partita No. 2 from Clavier-Übung I	C min.	Keyboard	3: 56	V/1: 15		00964
827	8.	1725–1727	Notebook A. M. Bach (1725) No. 1 = Partita No. 3 from Clavier-Übung I	A min.	Keyboard	3: 70	V/1: 35; V/4: 47		00964
828	8.	1725–1728	Partita No. 4 from Clavier-Übung I	D maj.	Keyboard	3: 82	V/1: 50		00966
829	8.	1725–1730	Partita No. 5 from Clavier-Übung I	G maj.	Keyboard	3: 102	V/1: 72		00967
830	8.	1725–1730	Notebook A. M. Bach (1725) No. 2 = Partita No. 6 from Clavier-Übung I	E min.	Keyboard	3: 116	V/1: 90; V/4: 60	after BWV 1019a/3 /5	00968
831	8.	1733–1735	Overture in the French style (Clavier-Übung II No. 2)	B min.	Harpsichord	3: 154	V/2: 20	after BWV 831a	00969
831a	8.	1727–1733	Overture in the French style (early version)	C min.	Keyboard		V/2: 43	→ BWV 831	00970
832	8.	before 1707	Suite for keyboard	A maj.	Keyboard	42: 255	V/10: 54	in Möllersche Handschrift	00971
833	8.	before 1707	Prelude and partita for keyboard	F maj.	Keyboard		V/10: 60	in Möllersche Handschrift	00972
836	8.	1720–1721	Allemande, Klavierbüchlein WFB No. 6	G min.	Keyboard	45^{1}: 214	V/5: 8	by Bach, W. F. & J. S.?	00975
837	8.	1720–1721	Allemande, Klavierbüchlein WFB No. 7 (incomplete)	G min.	Keyboard	45^{1}: 215	V/5: 10	by Bach, W. F. & J. S.?	00976
841	8.	1720–1721	Notebook A. M. Bach (1722) No. 11 Menuet = WFB No. 11: Menuet 1	G maj.	Keyboard	36: 209; 45^{1}: 215	V/5: 16 V/4: 44	by Bach, W. F. & J. S.?	00980
842	8.	1720–1721	Klavierbüchlein WFB No. 12: Menuet 2	G min.	Keyboard	36: 209; 45^{1}: 216	V/5: 17	by Bach, W. F. (BR A43) & J. S.?	00981
843	8.	1720–1721	Klavierbüchlein WFB No. 13: Menuet 3	G maj.	Keyboard	36: 210; 45^{1}: 216	V/5: 18		00982
846	8.	1722	Well-Tempered Clavier I, P. & F. No. 1	C maj.	Keyboard	14: 3	V/6.1: 2	after BWV 846a	00986
846/1	8.	1725 (AMB)	Notebook A. M. Bach (1725) No. 29 Prelude (short version of WTC I No. 1/1)	C maj.	Keyboard		V/4: 107		00986
846a	8.	1720	Klavierbüchlein WFB No. 14: Praeludium 1 (early WTC I No. 1/1)	C maj.	Keyboard	45^{1}: 216	V/5: 19; V/6.1: 127	→ BWV 846/1	00987
847	8.	1722	Well-Tempered Clavier I, P. & F. No. 2 (/1 = WFB No. 15: Praeludium 2)	C min.	Keyboard	14: 6; 45^{1}: 216	V/5: 20; V/6.1: 2	after BWV 847a	00988
847a	8.		Prelude and Fughetta (early WTC I No. 2)	C min.	Keyboard		V/6.1: 130	→ BWV 847	00989
848	8.	1722	Well-Tempered Clavier I, P. & F. No. 3 (/1 = WFB No. 21: Praeludium [8])	C♯ maj.	Keyboard	14: 10; 45^{1}: 218	V/5: 30; V/6.1: 2	after BWV 848a	00990
848a	8.		Prelude and Fughetta (early WTC I No. 3)	C♯ maj.	Keyboard		V/6.1: 134	→ BWV 848	00991
849	8.	1722	Well-Tempered Clavier I, P. & F. No. 4 (/1 = WFB No. 22: Praeludium [9])	C♯ min.	Keyboard	14: 14; 45^{1}: 218	V/5: 32; V/6.1: 2	after BWV 849a	00992
849a	8.		Prelude and Fughetta (early WTC I No. 4)	C♯ min.	Keyboard		V/6.1: 140	→ BWV 849	00993
850	8.	1722	Well-Tempered Clavier I, P. & F. No. 5 (/1 = WFB No. 17: Praeludium 4)	D maj.	Keyboard	14: 18; 45^{1}: 217	V/5: 23; V/6.1: 2	after BWV 850a	00994
850a	8.		Prelude and Fughetta (early WTC I No. 5)	D maj.	Keyboard		V/6.1: 146	→ BWV 850	00995
851	8.	1722	Well-Tempered Clavier I, P. & F. No. 6 (/1 = WFB No. 16: Praeludium 3)	D min.	Keyboard	14: 22; 45^{1}: 217	V/5: 22; V/6.1: 2	after BWV 851a	00996
851a	8.		Prelude and Fughetta (early WTC I No. 6)	D min.	Keyboard		V/6.1: 150	→ BWV 851	00997
852	8.	1722	Well-Tempered Clavier I, P. & F. No. 7	E♭ maj.	Keyboard	14: 26	V/6.1: 32	after BWV 852a	00998
852a	8.		Prelude and Fughetta (early WTC I No. 7)	E♭ maj.	Keyboard		V/6.1: 154	→ BWV 852	00999
853	8.	1722	Well-Tempered Clavier I, P. & F. No. 8 (/1 = WFB No. 23: Praeludium [10])	E♭ min. D♯ min.	Keyboard	14: 32; 45^{1}: 218	V/5: 34; V/6.1: 38	after BWV 853a; → K. 404a/1	01000
853a	8.		Prelude and Fughetta (early WTC I No. 8)	E♭ min. D♯ min.	Keyboard		V/6.1: 160	→ BWV 853	01001
854	8.	1722	Well-Tempered Clavier I, P. & F. No. 9 (/1 = WFB No. 19: Praeludium 6)	E maj.	Keyboard	14: 36; 45^{1}: 218	V/5: 26; V/6.1: 44	after BWV 854a	01002
854a	8.		Prelude and Fughetta (early WTC I No. 9)	E maj.	Keyboard		V/6.1: 166	→ BWV 854	01003
855	8.	1722	Well-Tempered Clavier I, P. & F. No. 10	E min.	Keyboard	14: 38	V/6.1: 48	after BWV 855a	01004
855a	8.	c.1720	Prelude and Fughetta (early WTC I No. 10) (/1 = WFB No. 18: Praeludium 5)	E min.	Keyboard	45^{1}: 217	V/5: 24; V/6.1: 170	→ BWV 855	01005
856	8.	1722	Well-Tempered Clavier I, P. & F. No. 11 (/1 = WFB No. 20: Praeludium 7)	F maj.	Keyboard	14: 42; 45^{1}: 218	V/5: 28; V/6.1: 54	after BWV 856a	01006
856a	8.		Prelude and Fughetta (early WTC I No. 11)	F maj.	Keyboard		V/6.1: 174	→ BWV 856	01007
857	8.	1722	Well-Tempered Clavier I, P. & F. No. 12 (/1 = WFB No. 24: Praeludium [11])	F min.	Keyboard	14: 44; 45^{1}: 218	V/5: 36; V/6.1: 58	after BWV 857a	01008
857a	8.		Prelude and Fughetta (early WTC I No. 12)	F min.	Keyboard		V/6.1: 178	→ BWV 857	01009
858	8.	1722	Well-Tempered Clavier I, P. & F. No. 13	F♯ maj.	Keyboard	14: 48	V/6.1: 64	after BWV 858a	01010
858a	8.		Prelude and Fughetta (early WTC I No. 13)	F♯ maj.	Keyboard		V/6.1: 184	→ BWV 858	01011
859	8.	1722	Well-Tempered Clavier I, P. & F. No. 14	F♯ min.	Keyboard	14: 50	V/6.1: 64	after BWV 859a	01012
859a	8.		Prelude and Fughetta (early WTC I No. 14)	F♯ min.	Keyboard		V/6.1: 188	→ BWV 859	01013
860	8.	1722	Well-Tempered Clavier I, P. & F. No. 15	G maj.	Keyboard	14: 52	V/6.1: 72	after BWV 860a	01014
860a	8.		Prelude and Fughetta (early WTC I No. 15)	G maj.	Keyboard		V/6.1: 192	→ BWV 860	01015
861	8.	1722	Well-Tempered Clavier I, P. & F. No. 16	G min.	Keyboard	14: 57	V/6.1: 78	after BWV 861a	01016
861a	8.		Prelude and Fughetta (early WTC I No. 16)	G min.	Keyboard		V/6.1: 198	→ BWV 861	01017
862	8.	1722	Well-Tempered Clavier I, P. & F. No. 17	A♭ maj.	Keyboard	14: 60	V/6.1: 82	after BWV 862a	01018
862a	8.		Prelude and Fughetta (early WTC I No. 17)	A♭ maj.	Keyboard		V/6.1: 202	→ BWV 862	01019
863	8.	1722	Well-Tempered Clavier I, P. & F. No. 18	G♯ min.	Keyboard	14: 64	V/6.1: 86	after BWV 863a	01020
863a	8.		Prelude and Fughetta (early WTC I No. 18)	G♯ min.	Keyboard		V/6.1: 206	→ BWV 863	01021
864	8.	1722	Well-Tempered Clavier I, P. & F. No. 19	A maj.	Keyboard	14: 66	V/6.1: 90	after BWV 864a	01022
864a	8.		Prelude and Fughetta (early WTC I No. 19)	A maj.	Keyboard		V/6.1: 210	→ BWV 864	01023
865	8.	1722	Well-Tempered Clavier I, P. & F. No. 20	A min.	Keyboard	14: 70	V/6.1: 96	after BWV 865a	01024
865a	8.		Prelude and Fughetta (early WTC I No. 20)	A min.	Keyboard		V/6.1: 216	→ BWV 865	01025
866	8.	1722	Well-Tempered Clavier I, P. & F. No. 21	B♭ maj.	Keyboard	14: 74	V/6.1: 104	after BWV 866a	01026
866a	8.		Prelude and Fughetta (early WTC I No. 21)	B♭ maj.	Keyboard		V/6.1: 224	→ BWV 866	01027
867	8.	1722	Well-Tempered Clavier I, P. & F. No. 22	B♭ min.	Keyboard	14: 78	V/6.1: 108	after BWV 867a; → Hess 38	01028
867a	8.		Prelude and Fughetta (early WTC I No. 22)	B♭ min.	Keyboard		V/6.1: 228	→ BWV 867	01029
868	8.	1722	Well-Tempered Clavier I, P. & F. No. 23	B maj.	Keyboard	14: 82	V/6.1: 112	after BWV 868a	01030
868a	8.		Prelude and Fughetta (early WTC I No. 23)	B maj.	Keyboard		V/6.1: 232	→ BWV 868	01031
869	8.	1722	Well-Tempered Clavier I, P. & F. No. 24	B min.	Keyboard	14: 84	V/6.1: 116	after BWV 869a	01032
869a	8.		Prelude and Fughetta (early WTC I No. 24)	B min.	Keyboard		V/6.1: 236	→ BWV 869	01033
870b 870/2	8.	1739–1742	Well-Tempered Clavier II, P. & F. No. 1 (version A)	C maj.	Keyboard	45^{1}: 243; 14: 94	V/6.2: 2, 6, 342		01036
871	8.	1739–1742; 1744	Well-Tempered Clavier II, P. & F. No. 2	C min.	Keyboard	14: 96	V/6.2: 8, 160	→ K. 405/1	01037
872	8.	1739–1742; 1744	Well-Tempered Clavier II, P. & F. No. 3	C♯ maj.	Keyboard	14: 100	V/6.2: 12, 164, 352	after BWV 872a	01038
872a/1	8.	1739–1740	Prelude (early WTC II, P. & F. No. 3/1)	C maj.	Keyboard	14: 243	V/6.2: 344	→ BWV 872/1	01039
872a/2	8.	1738	Fughetta (early WTC II, P. & F. No. 3/2)	C maj.	Keyboard	36: 224	V/6.2: 358	→ BWV 872/2	01039
873	8.	1739–1742; 1744	Well-Tempered Clavier II, P. & F. No. 4	C♯ maj.	Keyboard	14: 104	V/6.2: 16, 168		01040
874	8.	1739–1742; 1744	Well-Tempered Clavier II, P. & F. No. 5	D maj.	Keyboard	14: 108	V/6.2: 24, 176	→ K. 405/5	01041
875	8.	1739–1742; 1744	Well-Tempered Clavier II, P. & F. No. 6	D min.	Keyboard	14: 112	V/6.2: 30; 182, 348, 356	after BWV 875a	01042
875a	8.	1739–1740	Preambulum (early WTC II, P. & F. No. 6/1)	D min.	Keyboard	36: 224	V/6.2: 346	→ BWV 875/1	01043
876	8.	1739–1742; 1744	Well-Tempered Clavier II, P. & F. No. 7	E♭ maj.	Keyboard	14: 116	V/6.2: 36, 188, 354	→ K. 405/2	01044
877	8.	1739–1742; 1744	Well-Tempered Clavier II, P. & F. No. 8	D♯ min.	Keyboard	14: 120	V/6.2: 42, 194	→ K. 405/4	01045
878	8.	1739–1742; 1744	Well-Tempered Clavier II, P. & F. No. 9	E maj.	Keyboard	14: 124	V/6.2: 48, 200	→ K. 405/3	01046
879	8.	1739–1742; 1744	Well-Tempered Clavier II, P. & F. No. 10	E min.	Keyboard	14: 128	V/6.2: 54, 206		01047
880	8.	1739–1742; 1744	Well-Tempered Clavier II, P. & F. No. 11	F maj.	Keyboard	14: 134	V/6.2: 62, 215		01048
881	8.	1739–1742; 1744	Well-Tempered Clavier II, P. & F. No. 12	F min.	Keyboard	14: 138	V/6.2: 69, 221		01049
882	8.	1739–1742; 1744	Well-Tempered Clavier II, P. & F. No. 13	F♯ maj.	Keyboard	14: 142	V/6.2: 76, 228	→ K. 404a/3	01050
883	8.	1739–1742; 1744	Well-Tempered Clavier II, P. & F. No. 14	F♯ min.	Keyboard	14: 146	V/6.2: 84, 236	→ K. 404a/2	01051
884	8.	1739–1742; 1744	Well-Tempered Clavier II, P. & F. No. 15	G maj.	Keyboard	14: 150	V/6.2: 90, 242, 350	after BWV 902/2	01052
885	8.	1739–1742; 1744	Well-Tempered Clavier II, P. & F. No. 16	G min.	Keyboard	14: 154	V/6.2: 94, 246		01053
886	8.	1739–1742; 1744	Well-Tempered Clavier II, P. & F. No. 17	A♭ maj.	Keyboard	14: 160	V/6.2: 100, 108, 252	after BWV 901/2	01054
887	8.	1739–1742; 1744	Well-Tempered Clavier II, P. & F. No. 18	G♯ min.	Keyboard	14: 166	V/6.2: 112, 260		01055
888	8.	1739–1742; 1744	Well-Tempered Clavier II, P. & F. No. 19	A maj.	Keyboard	14: 172	V/6.2: 120, 268		01056
889	8.	1739–1742; 1744	Well-Tempered Clavier II, P. & F. No. 20	A min.	Keyboard	14: 176	V/6.2: 124, 272		01057
890	8.	1739–1742; 1744	Well-Tempered Clavier II, P. & F. No. 21	B♭ maj.	Keyboard	14: 180	V/6.2: 128, 276		01058
891	8.	1739–1742; 1744	Well-Tempered Clavier II, P. & F. No. 22	B♭ min.	Keyboard	14: 186	V/6.2: 134, 282		01059
892	8.	1739–1742; 1744	Well-Tempered Clavier II, P. & F. No. 23	B maj.	Keyboard	14: 192	V/6.2: 142, 290		01060
893	8.	1739–1742; 1744	Well-Tempered Clavier II, P. & F. No. 24	B min.	Keyboard	14: 198	V/6.2: 150, 298		01061
870	8.	1744	Well-Tempered Clavier II, P. & F. No. 1 (version B)	C maj.	Keyboard	14: 91	V/6.2: 156	after BWV 870a	01034
894	8.	1710–1717 (JTK)	Prelude and Fugue	A min.	Keyboard	36: 91	V/9.2: 40	→ BWV 1044/1, /3; in SBB P 801, P 804	01062
895	8.	1709 (JCB)	Prelude and Fugue	A min.	Keyboard	36: 104	V/9.2: 69	in Yale LM 4982	01063
896	8.	1704–1707	Prelude and Fugue	A maj.	Keyboard	36: 157	V/9.2: 72	in Möllersche Handschrift	01064
870a	8.	before 1727	Prelude and Fughetta	C maj.	Keyboard	36: 224	V/6.2: 307, 310	→ BWV 870; in SBB P 804, P 1089	01035
899	8.	before 1727	Prelude and Fughetta	D min.	Keyboard	36: 106	V/6.2: 314; V/12: 24	in SBB P 804, P 1089	01068
900	8.	before 1727	Prelude and Fughetta	E min.	Keyboard	36: 108	V/6.2; V/12	in SBB P 804, P 1089	01069
901	8.	before 1727	Prelude and Fughetta	F maj.	Keyboard	36: 112	V/6.2: 324	→ BWV 886/2; in SBB P 1089	01070
902	8.	c.1729	Prelude and Fughetta	G maj.	Keyboard	36: 114	V/6.2: 328	→ BWV 884/2; in SBB P 804, P 1089	01071
902/1a	8.	before 1727	Prelude (previous Prelude to BWV 902/2)	G maj.	Keyboard	36: 220	V/6.2: 334, 338	→ BWV 884/2; in SBB P 804	01072
903	8.		Chromatic Fantasia and Fugue	D min.	Keyboard	36: 71	V/9.2: 76	after BWV 903a; in SBB P 803, P 651	01073
903a	8.		Fantasia (early BWV 903/1)	D min.	Keyboard	36: 219	V/9.2: 90	→ BWV 903/1; in D-DS Mus. ms. 69	01074
904	8.	before 1727	Fantasia and Fugue	A min.	Keyboard	36: 81	V/9.2	in SBB P 804	01075
906	8.	before 1729 c.1738	Fantasia and Fugue (Fugue incomplete)	C min.	Keyboard	36: 145, 238	V/9.2: 110	in US-BETbc, D-Dl Mus.2405-T-52	01077
910	8.	1707–1713	Toccata	F♯ min.	Kb (or) Org	3: 311	V/9.1: 1	in Andreas-Bach-Buch	01081
911	8.	1707–1713	Toccata	C min.	Kb (or) Org	3: 322	V/9.1: 13	in Andreas-Bach-Buch	01082
912	8.	1707–1713	Toccata	D maj.	Kb (or) Org	36: 26	V/9.1: 38	after BWV 912a; ↔ BWV 532/1	01083
912a	8.	1704–1707	Toccata	D maj.	Kb (or) Org	36: 218	V/9.1: 26	→ BWV 912; in Möllersche Handschrift	01084
913	8.	1707–1709	Toccata	D min.	Kb (or) Org	36: 36	V/9.1: 50, 63	after BWV 913a	01085
913a	8.		Toccata	D min.	Kb (or) Org		V/9.1: 52	→ BWV 913; publ. 1801	01086
914	8.	1707–1709	Toccata	E min.	Kb (or) Org	36: 47	V/9.1: 78		01087
915	8.	1707–1709	Toccata	G min.	Kb (or) Org	36: 54	V/9.1: 87		01088
916	8.	1707–1713	Toccata	G maj.	Kb (or) Org	36: 63	V/9.1: 100	in Andreas-Bach-Buch	01089
917	8.	1704–1707	Fantasia	G min.	Keyboard	36: 143	V/9.1: 14, 16	in Möllersche Handschrift	01090
918	8.		Fantasia on a Rondo	C min.	Keyboard	36: 148	V/9.1: 14, 18		01091
921	8.	1707–1713	Prelude	C min.	Keyboard	36: 136	V/9.1: 24	in Andreas-Bach-Buch	01094
922	8.	1710–1714 (JTK)	Prelude (Fantasia)	A min.	Keyboard	36: 138	V/9.2: 27, 34	in SBB P 803	01095
923	8.	c.1723?	Prelude	B min.	Keyboard	42: 211	V/9.2: 116	by Pachelbel, W. H.?; → BWV 923a; in SBB P 401	01096
924	8.	c.1720	Twelve Little Preludes No. 1: Preambulum (WFB No. 2)	C maj.	Keyboard	36: 118; 45^{1}: 214	V/5: 4	→ BWV 924a	01098
924a	8.	1720–1726	Twelve Little Preludes No. 1a: Preludium ex c♮ (WFB No. 26)	C maj.	Keyboard	36: 221; 45^{1}: 220	V/5: 41	after BWV 924; BR A44 F(add) 206	01099
925	8.	1720–1726	Twelve Little Preludes No. 4: Preludium ex d♮ (WFB No. 27)	D maj.	Keyboard	36: 121; 45^{1}: 220	V/5: 42	BR A45 F(add) 206	01100
926	8.	c.1720	Twelve Little Preludes No. 5: Preludium (WFB No. 4)	D min.	Keyboard	36: 122; 45^{1}: 214	V/5: 6		01101
927	8.	1720–1726	Twelve Little Preludes No. 8: Preambulum (WFB No. 8)	F maj.	Keyboard	36: 124; 45^{1}: 215	V/5: 10		01102
928	8.	1720–1726	Twelve Little Preludes No. 9: Preludium (WFB No. 10)	F maj.	Keyboard	36: 124; 45^{1}: 215	V/5: 14		01103
929	8.	1720–1726	Twelve Little Preludes No. 10: Trio for a Minuet by Stölzel (WFB No. 48^{e})	G min.	Keyboard	36: 126; 45^{1}: 226	V/5: 89	→ BWV 814a	01104
930	8.	1720–1726	Twelve Little Preludes No. 11: Preambulum (WFB No. 9)	G min.	Keyboard	36: 126; 45^{1}: 215	V/5: 12		01105
931	8.	1720–1726	Preludium, Klavierbüchlein WFB No. 29	A min.	Keyboard	36: 237; 45^{1}: 220	V/5: 45	BR A47 F(add) 206	01106
932	8.	1720–1726	Preludium ex e♭, Klavierbüchlein WFB No. 28 (incomplete)	E min.	Keyboard	36: 237; 45^{1}: 220	V/5: 44	BR A46 F(add) 206	01107
933	8.	1717–1723?	Six Little Preludes No. 1	C maj.	Keyboard	36: 128	V/9.2: 3	in SBB P 542, P 885	01108
934	8.	1717–1723?	Six Little Preludes No. 2	C min.	Keyboard	36: 128	V/9.2: 4	in SBB P 542, P 885	01109
935	8.	1717–1723?	Six Little Preludes No. 3	D min.	Keyboard	36: 130	V/9.2: 5	in SBB P 542, P 885	01110
936	8.	1717–1723?	Six Little Preludes No. 4	D maj.	Keyboard	36: 131	V/9.2: 6	in SBB P 542, P 885	01111
937	8.	1717–1723?	Six Little Preludes No. 5	E maj.	Keyboard	36: 132	V/9.2: 8	in SBB P 542, P 885	01112
938	8.	1717–1723?	Six Little Preludes No. 6	E min.	Keyboard	36: 133	V/9.2: 10	in SBB P 542, P 885	01113
939	8.	1726–1727	Five Little Preludes No. 1 (=12 L. P. No. 2)	C maj.	Keyboard	36: 119	V/12: 50	by Bach?; in SBB P 804	01114
940	8.	1726–1727	Five Little Preludes No. 2 (=12 L. P. No. 6)	D min.	Keyboard	36: 123	V/12: 50	by Bach?; in SBB P 804	01115
941	8.	1726–1727	Five Little Preludes No. 3 (=12 L. P. No. 7)	E min.	Keyboard	36: 123	V/12: 51	by Bach?; in SBB P 804	01116
942	8.	1726–1727	Five Little Preludes No. 4 (=12 L. P. No. 12)	A min.	Keyboard	36: 127	V/12: 52	by Bach?; in SBB P 804	01117
943	8.	1725–1727	Five Little Preludes No. 5	C maj.	Org (Kb?)	36: 134	V/12: 53	in SBB P 804	01118
944	8.	1707–1713	Fantasia and Fugue	A min.	Keyboard	3: 334	V/9.2: 133	in Andreas-Bach-Buch	01119
946	8.	early work?	Fugue on a theme by Albinoni	C maj.	Keyboard	36: 159	V/9.2: 153	after Albinoni, Op. 1, No. 12/4 (theme)	01121
947	8.	early work?	Fugue	A min.	Keyboard	36: 161	V/12: 55	by Bach?	01122
948	8.	early work?	Fugue	D min.	Keyboard	36: 164	V/9.2: 156	in D-B N. Mus. ms. 10580	01123
949	8.	1707–1713	Fugue	A maj.	Keyboard	36: 169	V/9.2: 163	after Albinoni (theme)?; in Andreas-Bach-Buch	01124
950	8.	before 1725	Fugue on a theme by Albinoni	A maj. G maj.	Keyboard	36: 173	V/9.2: 168	after Albinoni (theme); in SBB P 804	01125
951	8.	1714–1717	Fugue on a theme by Albinoni	B min.	Keyboard	36: 178	V/9.2: 118	after BWV 951a; in SBB P 801	01126
951a	8.	1714–1717	Fugue on a theme by Albinoni (early version)	B min.	Keyboard	36: 221	V/9.2: 127	after Albinoni (theme); → BWV 951; in D-LEm Poel. mus. Ms. 9	01127
952	8.		Fugue	C maj.	Keyboard	36: 184	V/9.2: 176		01128
953	8.	1720–1726	Fugue a 3, Klavierbüchlein WFB No. 31	C maj.	Keyboard	36: 186; 45^{1}: 220	V/5: 46		01129
954	8.	early work?	Fugue on a theme by Reincken	B♭ maj.	Keyboard	42: 50	V/11: 200	after Reincken, Hortus Musicus No. 2/2 (theme)	01130
955	8.	early work	Fugue	B♭ maj.	Keyboard	42: 55	V/12: 60	after BWV 955a; in SBB P 425, P 804	01131
955a	8.	early work	Fugue	B♭ maj.	Organ	42: 298	V/12: 65	by Erselius?; → BWV 955; in SBB P 247, P 595	01132
959	8.		Fugue	A min.	Keyboard	42: 208	V/9.2: 178	by Bach?	01136
961	8.	?	Fughetta	C min.	Keyboard	36: 154	V/9.2: 182	in SBB P 823	01138
963	8.	early work	Sonata for keyboard	D maj.	Keyboard	36: 19	V/10: 32	in SBB P 804	01140
965	8.	c.1714–1717 or earlier	Sonata for keyboard after Reincken	A min.	Keyboard	42: 29	V/11: 173	after Reincken, Hortus Musicus No. 1/1–/5; in SBB P 803	01142
966	8.	c.1714–1717 or earlier	Sonata for keyboard after Reincken	A min.	Keyboard	42: 42	V/11: 188	after Reincken, Hortus Musicus No. 3/1–/5; in SBB P 803	01143
967	8.	1704–1707	Sonata transcription, 1st movement	A min.	Keyboard	45^{1}: 168	V/9.2: 184	in SBB P 804	01144
971	8.	1733–1735	Italian Concerto (Clavier-Übung II No. 1)	F maj.	Harpsichord	3: 139	V/2: 2		01148
972	8.	July 1713– July 1714	Concerto for solo keyboard (1/16)	D maj.	Keyboard	42: 59	V/11: 3	after Vivaldi, Op. 3 No. 9	01149
972a	8.	July 1713– July 1714	Concerto for solo keyboard (1/16), early version	D maj.	Keyboard		V/11: 161	after Vivaldi, Op. 3 No. 9	01150
973	8.	July 1713– July 1714	Concerto for solo keyboard (2/16)	G maj.	Keyboard	42: 59	V/11: 12	after Vivaldi, Op. 7 No. 8	01151
974	8.	July 1713– July 1714	Concerto for solo keyboard (3/16)	D min.	Keyboard	42: 59	V/11: 20	after Marcello, A., Oboe Concerto	01152
975	8.	July 1713– July 1714	Concerto for solo keyboard (4/16)	G min.	Keyboard	42: 59	V/11: 30	after Vivaldi, Op. 4 No. 6	01153
976	8.	July 1713– July 1714	Concerto for solo keyboard (5/16)	C maj.	Keyboard	42: 59	V/11: 39	after Vivaldi, Op. 3 No. 12	01154
977	8.	July 1713– July 1714	Concerto for solo keyboard (6/16)	C maj.	Keyboard	42: 59	V/11: 50	after unknown model	01155
978	8.	July 1713– July 1714	Concerto for solo keyboard (7/16)	F maj.	Keyboard	42: 59	V/11: 56	after Vivaldi, Op. 3 No. 3 (RV 310)	01156
979	8.	July 1713– July 1714	Concerto for solo keyboard (8/16)	B min.	Keyboard	42: 59	V/11: 64	after Vivaldi, RV 813 (previously: Torelli)	01157
980	8.	July 1713– July 1714	Concerto for solo keyboard (9/16)	G maj.	Keyboard	42: 59	V/11: 79	after Vivaldi, Op. 4 No. 1 (RV 381)	01158
981	8.	July 1713– July 1714	Concerto for solo keyboard (10/16)	C min.	Keyboard	42: 59	V/11: 90	after Marcello, B., Op. 1 No. 2	01159
982	8.	July 1713– July 1714	Concerto for solo keyboard (11/16)	B♭ maj.	Keyboard	42: 59	V/11: 100	after J. E. of Saxe-Weimar, Op. 1 No. 1	01160
983	8.	July 1713– July 1714	Concerto for solo keyboard (12/16)	G min.	Keyboard	42: 59	V/11: 110	after unknown model	01161
984	8.	July 1713– July 1714	Concerto for solo keyboard (13/16)	C maj.	Keyboard	42: 59	V/11: 118	after J. E. of Saxe-Weimar, lost Concerto; → BWV 595	01162
985	8.	July 1713– July 1714	Concerto for solo keyboard (14/16)	G min.	Keyboard	42: 59	V/11: 128	after Telemann, TWV 51:g1	01163
986	8.	July 1713– July 1714	Concerto for solo keyboard (15/16)	G min.	Keyboard	42: 59	V/11: 137	after unknown model	01164
987	8.	July 1713– July 1714	Concerto for solo keyboard (16/16)	D min.	Keyboard	42: 59	V/11: 142	after J. E. of Saxe-Weimar, Op. 1 No. 4	01165
988	8.	1741–1742	Goldberg Variations (Clavier-Übung IV)	G maj.	Harpsichord	3: 263	V/2: 69	→ BWV 1087	01166
988/1	8.	c.1740? (AMB)	Notebook A. M. Bach (1725) No. 26 Aria of the Goldberg Variations	G maj.	Harpsichord	3: 263	V/4: 103	→ BWV 1087	01166
989	8.	1707–1713	Aria variata	A min.	Keyboard	36: 203	V/10: 21	in Andreas-Bach-Buch	01167
991	8.	1722	Notebook A. M. Bach (1722) No. 7 Air with variations (incomplete)	C min.	Keyboard	43^{2}: 4	V/4: 40		01169
992	8.	1704–1707	Capriccio on the departure of a beloved brother	B♭ maj.	Keyboard	36: 190	V/10: 3	in Möllersche Handschrift	01170
993	8.	c.1705	Capriccio in honorem Johann Christoph Bachii Ohrdrufiensis	E maj.	Keyboard	36: 197	V/10: 12	in SBB P 804	01171
994	8.	1720	Klavierbüchlein WFB No. 1: Applicatio	C maj.	Keyboard	36: 237; 45^{1}:214	V/5: 4		01172
**9.**	Lute compositions (see also: List of solo lute compositions by Johann Sebastian Bach)								Up ↑
995	9.	Fall 1727 – Winter 1731	Suite for lute	G min.	Lu		V/10: 81	after BWV 1011	01173
996	9.	1710–1717 (JGW)	Suite for lute	E min.	Lu (Lw?)	45^{1}: 149	V/10: 94	in SBB P 801, pp. 385–395	01174
997.1	9.	1720–1739	Suite (1st version)	C min.	Lw	45^{1}: 156	V/10: 102	in SBB P 650; → BWV 997.2	01175
997.2	9.	1720–1739	Suite (2nd version)	C min.	Lu	45^{1}: 156	V/10: 102	in D LEm III 11.5; after BWV 997.1	11576
998	9.	1735–1745	Prelude, Fugue and Allegro	E♭ maj.	Lu (or) Hc	45^{1}: 141	V/10: 114		01176
999	9.	1717–1723	Prelude for lute (Twelve Little Preludes No. 3)	C min.	Lu	36: 119	V/10: 122	in SBB P 804, pp. 101–103	01177
1000	9.	after 1720	Fugue	G min.	Lu		V/10: 124	after BWV 1001/2; → 539/2; in MB Lpz III.11.4	01178
1006.2	9.	c.1736–1737	Suite	E maj.	Lu?	42: 16	V/10: 134	after BWV 1006.1	01185

== Other keyboard and lute compositions ==
=== Late contrapuntal works (BWV 1079–1080) ===
- BWV 1079 – The Musical Offering (Musikalisches Opfer) – some pieces intended for fortepiano
- BWV 1080 – The Art of Fugue (Die Kunst der Fuge) - some pieces indicated as being for a two-manual harpsichord

== Sources ==
- Dürr, Alfred; Kobayashi, Yoshitake, eds. (1998). Bach Werke Verzeichnis: Kleine Ausgabe – Nach der von Wolfgang Schmieder vorgelegten 2. Ausgabe [Bach Works Catalogue: Small Edition – After Wolfgang Schmieder's 2nd edition] (in German). Kirsten Beißwenger (collaborator). (BWV^{2a} ed.). Wiesbaden: Breitkopf & Härtel. ISBN 9783765102493. Preface in English and German.
- Eichberg, Hartwig (1976). Schulze, Hans-Joachim; Wolff, Christoph (eds.). "Unechtes unter Johann Sebastian Bachs Klavierwerken" [Inauthentic among the keyboard works of Johann Sebastian Bach]. Bach-Jahrbuch (in German). 1975 (61) (Neue Bachgesellschaft ed.). Berlin: Evangelische Verlagsanstalt: 7–49. doi:10.13141/bjb.v1975.
- Henning, Uta (1987). "Zur Frage des Lautenklaviers bei Johann Sebastian Bach: Mögliche Zuweisung der Bachschen Lautenkompositionen an das Lautenklavier – Beschreibung des Instruments und Rekonstruktionsversuche im 20. Jahrhundert". In Berke, Dietrich; Hanemann, Dorothee (eds.). Alte Musik als ästhetische Gegenwart: Bach, Händel, Schütz. Bericht über den internationalen musikwissenschaftlichen Kongreß Stuttgart 1985 (in German). Vol. 2. Bärenreiter. pp. 465–469. ISBN 3-7618-0767-8 – via Qucosa.
- Neemann, Hans [at Wikidata] (1931). "J. S. Bachs Lautenkompositionen" [J. S. Bach's lute compositions]. In Schering, Arnold (ed.). Bach-Jahrbuch 1931 [Bach-Yearbook 1931]. Bach-Jahrbuch (in German). Vol. 28. Leipzig: Breitkopf & Härtel. pp. 72–87. doi:10.13141/bjb.v1931 – via Qucosa.
- "US-NHub Music Deposit 31 (Klavierbüchlein für W. F. Bach)". Bach Digital. Leipzig: Bach Archive; et al. 2020-03-03.
