= List of suites by Johann Sebastian Bach =

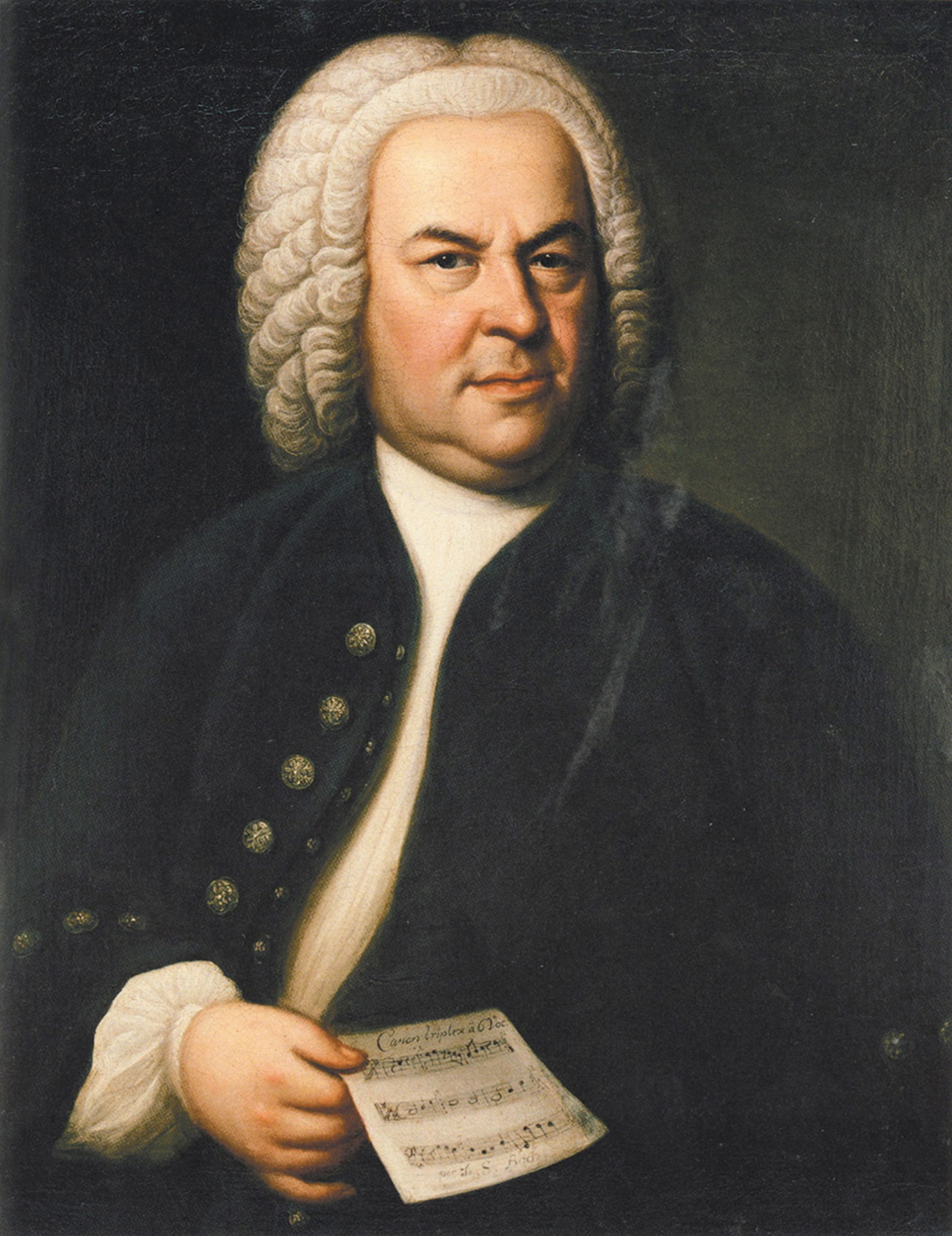
1748 portrait of J.S. Bach

Johann Sebastian Bach composed suites, partitas and overtures in the baroque dance suite format for solo instruments such as harpsichord, lute, violin, cello and flute, and for orchestra.

== Harpsichord ==
- English Suites, BWV 806–811
- French Suites, BWV 812–817
- Partitas for keyboard, BWV 825–830
- Overture in the French style, BWV 831
- Other:
  - Miscellaneous suites, BWV 818–824
  - Miscellaneous suites and suite movements, BWV 832–845

== Lute ==
- Lute Suite in G minor, BWV 995
- Lute Suite in E minor, BWV 996
- Lute Suite in C minor, BWV 997
- Prelude, Fugue and Allegro in E-flat major, BWV 998

== Violin ==
From Sonatas and Partitas for Solo Violin, BWV 1001–1006:

- Partita for Violin No. 1, BWV 1002
- Partita for Violin No. 2, BWV 1004
- Partita for Violin No. 3, BWV 1006

== Cello ==
- Cello Suites, BWV 1007–1012

== Flute ==
- Partita in A minor for solo flute, BWV 1013

== Orchestral suites ==
- Orchestral suites, BWV 1066–1069, also called overtures
- Orchestral Suite in G minor, BWV 1070 (doubtful)

== See also ==
- List of compositions by Johann Sebastian Bach
