= Beginners (soundtrack) =

Beginners (Original Motion Picture Soundtrack)

Soundtrack album by various artists
- Released: May 31, 2011
- Recorded: 2011
- Genre: Contemporary classical; orchestral; folk; jazz; rhythm and blues
- Length: 40:05
- Label: Relativity Music Group

Beginners (Original Motion Picture Soundtrack) is the soundtrack to the 2011 film of the same name directed by Mike Mills. The album featured selections of contemporary classical, folk and jazz numbers, from artists such as Hoagy Carmichael, Gene Austin, Jelly Roll Morton, Mamie Smith and Josephine Baker as well as cues from the original score collaboratively composed by Roger Neill, Dave Palmer and Brian Reitzell. The album was released on May 31, 2011 by Relativity Music Group.

== Development ==
Like his previous film, Thumbsucker, the music of Beginners was "integral to the tempo and emotional core of the storyline". The musical ideas for the film were inspired from his family's choice of music; he pointed father's love to contemporary classical music, especially those of Wolfgang Amadeus Mozart, he could not get into Mozart's tunes, but go with the style of Johann Sebastian Bach. Hence, with the help of composer Roger Neill, he managed to score the music entirely in French horn which was "really beautiful and haunting" especially when it accompanies Christopher Plummer's character.

In contrast, Mills' mother was a fan of The Sting soundtrack and equated listening to the film's score by Scott Joplin as "hearing Christmas carols". He wanted to have the music that matched his mother's taste, when he looked on Jelly Roll Morton's scores in Library of Congress recordings. He added "It's not your typical rag piano stuff. It is slower, more melodic and there [are] all these fragments telling [Womack's] life story. They really became kind of like the harmonic center of the film for me."

His musical research while writing the script had let him exploring the work of Josephine Baker, Hoagy Carmichael, Gene Austin and Mamie Smith noting the contribution to jazz-inspired aspects of the film. He also credited French composer Georges Delerue's work to the film which acted as a foundation for the score composed by Neill, along with keyboardist Dave Palmer and Brian Reitzell.

== Track listing ==
No.	Title	Artist(s)	Length
1.	"Stardust"	Hoagy Carmichael	2:29
2.	"Everything's Made for Love"	Gene Austin	3:02
3.	"Bach Suite"	Johann Sebastian Bach	4:34
4.	"1955"	Roger Neill, Dave Palmer and Brian Reitzell	2:14
5.	"Sweet Jazz Music"	Jelly Roll Morton	1:43
6.	"That Da Da Strain"	Mamie Smith	2:52
7.	"Mamanita"	Jelly Roll Morton	4:14
8.	"Moon Waltz"	Roger Neill, Dave Palmer and Brian Reitzell	1:28
9.	"Veronica's Blues"	Roger Neill, Dave Palmer and Brian Reitzell	2:06
10.	"Breezin' Along With The Breeze"	Josephine Baker	2:56
11.	"The Beginner's Theme Suite"	Roger Neill, Dave Palmer and Brian Reitzell	8:01
12.	"Buddy Bertrand's Blues"	Jelly Roll Morton	4:26
Total length:			40:05

== Reception ==
James Sanford of Mlive called the "enticing soundtrack full of glorious 1920s selections from Jelly Roll Morton, Hoagy Carmichael and Josephine Baker" gives the film a "gentle boost", adding "the music could have been drawn from a Woody Allen film, and that seems to have been Mills' intent". Philip French of The Guardian wrote: "On the soundtrack is a slow, almost painfully plaintive version of Hoagy Carmichael's "Stardust", a 1920s song of lost love affectionately recalled, that's followed up by similarly nostalgic music that helps set the bittersweet tone of a beguiling film." Rodrigo Perez of IndieWire called the score as "introspective, minimal and assisted by some delightfully aces old-timey piano work".
