= Gigaleak =

Gigaleak is a term used to refer to a large data leak. It may refer specifically to:

- Nintendo Gigaleak, a 2020 data leak
- Cartoon Network gigaleak, a 2026 data leak

== See also ==
- Giga-
- Gigabyte
- Giga (disambiguation)
