= Giga (disambiguation) =

Giga- is a prefix for one billion.

Giga or GIGA may also refer to:

== Music and dance ==
- Gigue or giga: a Baroque dance
- Ģīga, a Latvian musical instrument
- Giga (instrument), a Scandinavian musical instrument
- Giga (musician), Japanese composer

== Media ==
- GIGA Television, a defunct German television channel
- St.GIGA, a defunct Japanese satellite radio station

== Other uses ==
- Giga (given name), a Georgian given name
- Giga (brand), an adult game and visual novel brand
- Giga Pets, a series of virtual pets
- German Institute for Global and Area Studies
- Giga (United Nations), UN projects, e.g. to connect schools to the internet
- Isuzu Giga, truck series
- Ivan Vuković (footballer), or Giga, Montenegrin footballer

== See also ==
- Gega (disambiguation)
