= Gergely Sárközy =

Hungarian musician

Gergely Sárközy is a Hungarian musician who plays guitar, lute, lute-harpsichord, viola bastarda, and organ. He has produced numerous recordings and has helped in the creation of animated film soundtracks including that of A nyár szemei ("The Eyes of Summer") for which he won an Award for Best Sound Engineering together with Nikolai Ivanov Neikov at the 4th Kecskemét Animation Film Festival.

== Recordings ==
=== As soloist ===
- J.S. Bach on Viola Bastarda, Lute and Lute-Harpsichord (double CD) (Hungaroton Classic Ltd, 1980, 1984, 1991)
- Gergely Sárközy plays Scarlatti Sonatas on guitar, lute, lute-harpsichord, viola bastarda, organ (Hungaroton Classic Ltd)
- Chaconne & Passacaglia (Purcell, Bach) (Hungaroton Classic Ltd)
- Famous Concerti (Amadis) (alt.)

etc.
