= English Suites (Bach) =

Collection of keyboard works by Johann Sebastian Bach

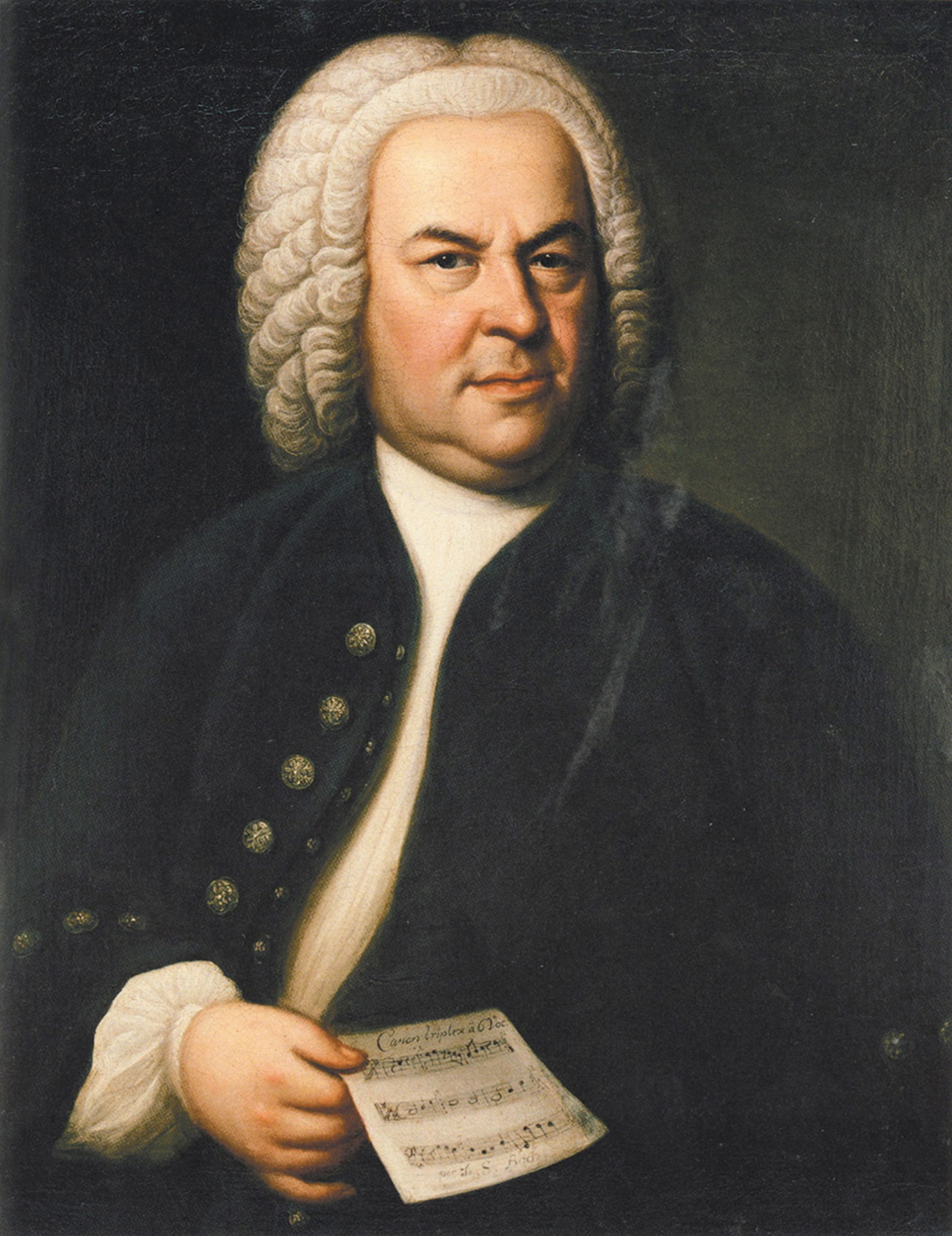
Portrait of Johann Sebastian Bach

The English Suites, BWV 806–811, are a set of six suites written by the German composer Johann Sebastian Bach for harpsichord (or clavichord) and generally thought to be the earliest of his 19 suites for keyboard (discounting several less well-known earlier suites), the others being the six French Suites (BWV 812–817), the six Partitas (BWV 825-830) and the Overture in the French style (BWV 831). They date from between 1713 and 1720.

== History ==
These six suites for keyboard are thought to be the earliest set that Bach composed aside from several miscellaneous suites written when he was much younger. Bach's English Suites display less affinity with Baroque English keyboard style than do the French Suites to French Baroque keyboard style. It has also been suggested that the name is a tribute to Charles Dieupart, whose fame was greatest in England, and on whose Six Suittes de clavessin Bach's English Suites were in part based.

Surface characteristics of the English Suites strongly resemble those of Bach's French Suites and Partitas, particularly in the sequential dance-movement structural organization and treatment of ornamentation. These suites also resemble the Baroque French keyboard suite typified by the generation of composers including Jean-Henri d'Anglebert, and the dance-suite tradition of French lutenists that preceded it.

In the English Suites especially, Bach's affinity with French lute music is demonstrated by his inclusion of a prelude for each suite, departing from an earlier tradition of German derivations of French suite (those of Johann Jakob Froberger and Georg Boehm are examples), which saw a relatively strict progression of the dance movements (Allemande, Courante, Sarabande and Gigue) and which did not typically feature a Prelude. Unlike the unmeasured preludes of French lute or keyboard style, however, Bach's preludes in the English Suites are composed in strict meter.

== The suites ==
The six suites are:

1. Suite No. 1 in A major, BWV 806
  1. Prelude
  2. Allemande
  3. Courante I
  4. Courante II
  5. Double I
  6. Double II
  7. Sarabande
  8. Bourrée I
  9. Bourrée II
  10. Gigue
2. Suite No. 2 in A minor, BWV 807
  1. Prelude
  2. Allemande
  3. Courante
  4. Sarabande
  5. Bourrée I
  6. Bourrée II
  7. Gigue
3. Suite No. 3 in G minor, BWV 808
  1. Prelude
  2. Allemande
  3. Courante
  4. Sarabande
  5. Gavotte I
  6. Gavotte II
  7. Gigue
4. Suite No. 4 in F major, BWV 809
  1. Prelude
  2. Allemande
  3. Courante
  4. Sarabande
  5. Menuet I
  6. Menuet II
  7. Gigue
5. Suite No. 5 in E minor, BWV 810
  1. Prelude
  2. Allemande
  3. Courante
  4. Sarabande
  5. Passepied I
  6. Passepied II
  7. Gigue
6. Suite No. 6 in D minor, BWV 811
  1. Prelude
  2. Allemande
  3. Courante
  4. Sarabande
  5. Double
  6. Gavotte I
  7. Gavotte II
  8. Gigue

This first suite is unusual in that it has two courantes and two doubles for the second courante. This suite also departs from the scheme of the other five, in that the prelude is short and based on a theme from a suite by Dieupart. The preludes of the other five suites in this series are based on the allegro of a concerto grosso form.

The key sequence follows the same series of notes as the chorale "Jesu, meine Freude". It is unestablished whether or not this is coincidental (but probably not since Bach was rather fond of this particular chorale tune and reused it in many of his compositions).

== Notable recordings ==
=== On harpsichord ===
- Wanda Landowska (No. 2, 3 & 5, Pearl, 1928–35)
- Ralph Kirkpatrick (Archiv Produktion, 1956)
- Helmut Walcha (EMI Electrola, 1959)
- Martin Galling (Murray Hill, 1970 [recorded in 1964])
- Kenneth Gilbert (Harmonia Mundi, 1981)
- Zuzana Růžičková (Supraphon/Eterna, 1981)
- Christiane Jaccottet (Saphir/Disky, 1982)
- Gustav Leonhardt (Virgin, 1984)
- Huguette Dreyfus (Archiv Produktion, 1974, 1990)
- Colin Tilney (Music&Arts, 1993)
- Trevor Pinnock (Archiv Production, 1992)
- Peter Watchorn (Musica Omnia, 1997)
- Pascal Dubreuil (Ramée, 2013)
- Ketil Haugsand (Simax Classics, 2014)

=== On piano ===
- Walter Gieseking (Nos. 2–4 & 6, Music & Arts, 1950)
- Alexander Borovsky (Vox, 1952)
- Tatiana Nikolayeva (Nos. 1 & 4, Scribendum, 1965)
- Friedrich Gulda (Nos. 2 & 3, Andante, 1969–70)
- Wilhelm Kempff (No. 3, Deutsche Grammophon, 1975)
- Glenn Gould (Columbia/Sony, 1977)
- Mieczysław Horszowski (No. 3, Pearl, 1979; No. 2, Arbiter, 1984; No. 5, RCA Japan, 1987)
- Ivo Pogorelić (Nos. 2 & 3, Deutsche Grammophon, 1985)
- András Schiff (Decca, 1988, 2003 Live in Hungary)
- Wolfgang Rübsam (Naxos, 1995)
- João Carlos Martins (Concord Concerto / Labor Records / Tomato Music, 1995–1996)
- Rosalyn Tureck (No. 3, Video Artists International, 1993)
- Murray Perahia (Sony Classics, 1997)
- Robert Levin (Hänssler, 1999)
- Martha Argerich (No. 2, Deutsche Grammophon, 1979)
- Ivo Janssen (Void, 2000)
- Angela Hewitt (Hyperion, 2003)
- Sviatoslav Richter, (Delos, 2004)
- Vladimir Feltsman (Nimbus, 2005)
- Ramin Bahrami (Decca, 2012)
- Piotr Anderszewski (No. 6, Accord, 1996))
- Piotr Anderszewski (No. 6, Erato/Warner Classics, 2004)
- Piotr Anderszewski (Nos. 1, 3 & 5, Warner Classics, 2014)

=== On cello ===
- Pablo Casals (Gavottes I and II from English Suite No. 6, BWV 811, arr. Fernand Pollain; Naxos Historical 8.110915-16)

== Media ==
English Suite No. 1 in A major, performed by Martha Goldstein
I. Prelude

II. Allemande

III. Courante I

IV. Courante II

V. Double I

VI. Double II

VII. Sarabande

VIII. Bourrée I and II

IX. Gigue

English Suite No. 3 in G minor, performed by Martha Goldstein
I. Prelude

II. Allemande

III. Courante

IV. Sarabande

V–VI. Gavotte I and II

VII. Gigue

== See also ==
- Works for keyboard by Johann Sebastian Bach
- French Suites, BWV 812-817
- Partitas, BWV 825-830
- List of compositions by Johann Sebastian Bach printed during his lifetime
