= Gega =

Gega may refer to:

- Gega River, a tributary of the Bzyb River of Georgia
- Gega, Bulgaria, a village in Bulgaria
- Gega Point, a promontory in Antarctica
- Gega (surname), an Albanian surname (including a list of people with the name)
- Gega Diasamidze (born 1992), Georgian footballer

== See also ==
- Carl Ritter von Ghega, Austrian railway engineer
- Jega (disambiguation)
- Giga (disambiguation)
