= Giga (given name) =

Giga is a Georgian given name.

People with the name include:

- Giga Bokeria (born 1972), Georgian politician
- Giga Chikadze (born 1988), Georgian mixed martial artist
- Giga Mamulashvili (born 1991), Russian footballer of Georgian descent
- Giga Norakidze (1930–1995), Georgian footballer
- Giga Ochkhikidze (born 1990), Georgian Paralympic athlete
- Giga Quparadze (born 1987), Georgian chess grandmaster
- Giga Zedania (fl. 2000s–2020s), Georgian philosopher and academic

== See also ==
- Giga (disambiguation)
