= Jega =

Jega may refer to:

- Jega (musician), Manchester, UK-based electronic music artist Dylan Nathan
- Jega, Nigeria, a Local Government Area in Kebbi State
- Japanese Enhanced Graphics Adapter, an enhanced EGA display adapter for Japanese AX architecture computers
- Attahiru Jega, 4th Chairman of the Independent National Electoral Commission of Nigeria, serving from 2010 to 2015
- Jega 'Rdomnai, an alien assassin and major antagonist in the video game Halo Infinite.
- Jaega, a former Native American people in Florida

== See also ==
- Gega (disambiguation)
