= Lautenwerck =

Keyboard instrument of the Baroque period

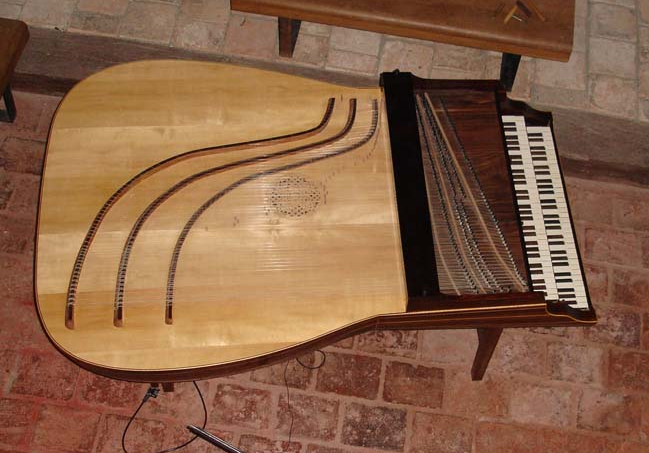
Lautenwerck

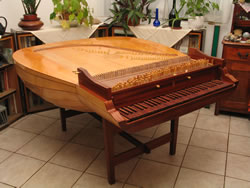
Lautenwerck

The lautenwerck (also spelled lautenwerk), alternatively called lute-harpsichord (lute-clavier) or keyboard lute, is a European keyboard instrument of the Baroque period. It is similar to a harpsichord, but with gut (sometimes nylon) rather than metal strings (except for the 4-foot register on some instruments), producing a mellow tone.

The instrument was favored by J. S. Bach, who owned two of the instruments at the time of his death, but no specimens from the eighteenth century have survived to the present day. It has been revived since the twentieth century by harpsichord makers Willard Martin, Keith Hill, and Steven Sorli. Three of its most prominent performers are the early music specialists Gergely Sárközy, Wolfgang Rübsam, and Robert Hill.

== Media ==
Performances by Martha Goldstein. Johann Sebastian Bach, Lute Suite in E minor, BWV 996.
Prelude-Presto

Allemande

Courante

Sarabande

Bourre

Gigue

Performances by Martha Goldstein. Johann Sebastian Bach, Lute Suite in C minor, BWV 997.
Prelude

Fuge

Sarabande

BWV 997 – Gigue

Performances by Martha Goldstein. Johann Sebastian Bach, Prelude, Fugue and Allegro in E-flat major, BWV 998.
Prelude

Fuge

Allegro

Performances by Felix Skowronek (flute) with Martha Goldstein. Johann Sebastian Bach, Flute Sonata in B minor, BWV 1030.
1. Andante

2. Largo e Dolce

3. Presto

Performances by Gergely Sárközy also are freely available.
