= Partita for keyboard No. 2, BWV 826 =

1726 composition for harpsichord by J. S. Bach

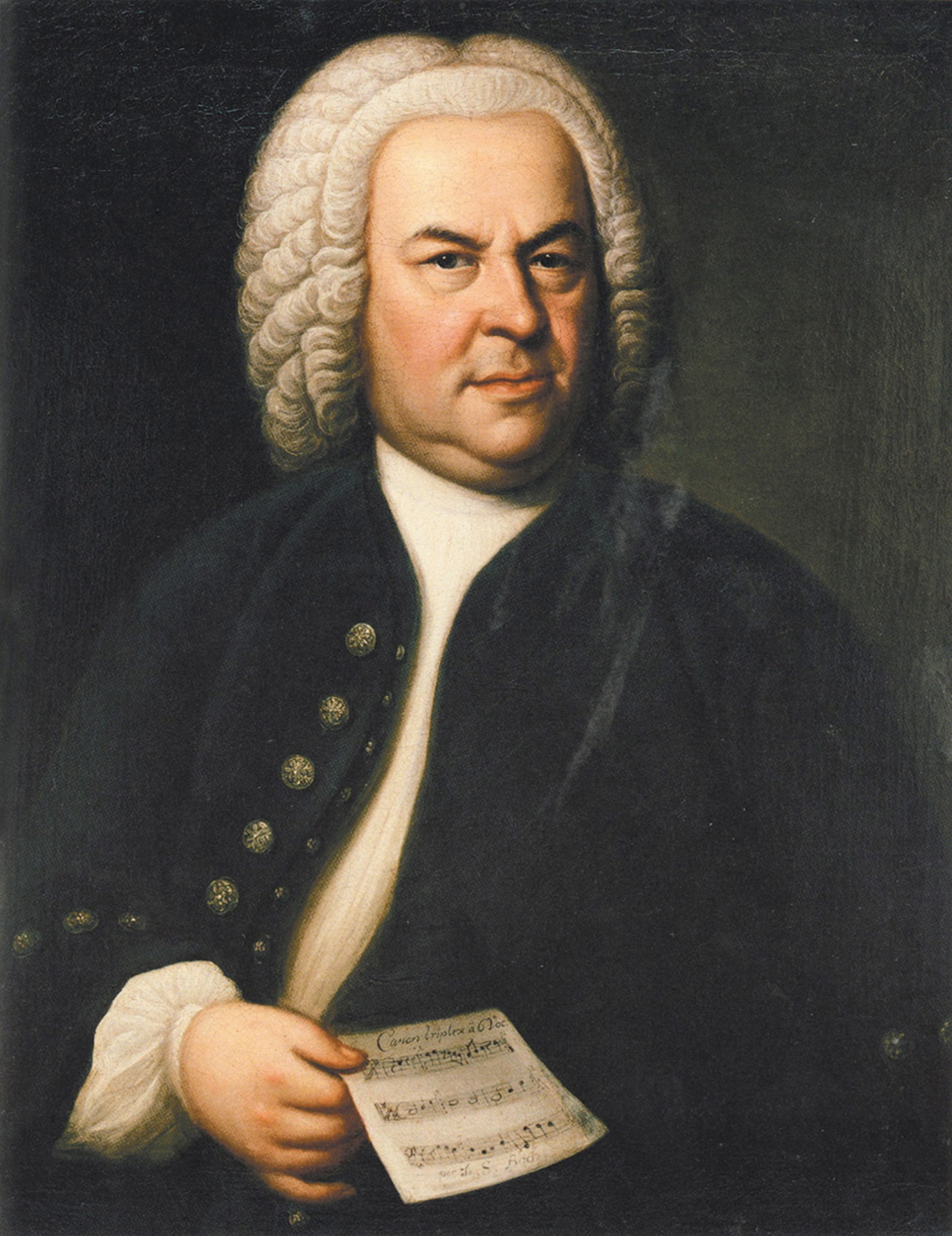
Johann Sebastian Bach

The Partita for keyboard No. 2 in C minor, BWV 826, is a suite of six movements written for the harpsichord by Johann Sebastian Bach. It was announced in 1727, issued individually, and then published as Bach's Clavier-Übung I in 1731.

== Musical structure ==
This partita consists of six movements:

1. Sinfonia. Grave adagio – Andante
2. Allemande
3. Courante
4. Sarabande
5. Rondeaux
6. Capriccio
