= Aria variata alla maniera italiana, BWV 989 =

Keyboard composition by Johann Sebastian Bach

Part 1 – Theme and Variations 1–5

Part 2 – Variations 6–9

Part 3 – Variation 10
All performed on a piano by Brendan Kinsella

Aria variata alla maniera italiana in A minor, BWV 989, is a keyboard work by Johann Sebastian Bach from around 1709, recorded as No. 36 in the Andreas-Bach-Buch (named after Johann Andreas Bach). It consists of a theme and ten virtuoso variations, each of them in binary form (two sections, both repeated).
