= Prelude and Fugue in C-sharp major, BWV 872 =

Keyboard composition by Johann Sebastian Bach

The Prelude and Fugue in C♯ major, BWV 872, is a keyboard composition written by Johann Sebastian Bach. It is the third prelude and fugue in the second book of The Well-Tempered Clavier, a series of 48 preludes and fugues in every major and minor key.

== Analysis ==
=== Prelude ===
The prelude is in common time and has 50 measures, built upon the characteristic arpeggios similar to the famous C major prelude from the first book of The Well-Tempered Clavier until the fugato.

The arpeggios ends at m. 25, and the fugato starts, which uses the time signature of 3/8. It has three voices.

=== Fugue ===
The fugue has three voices and 35 measures. The subject is simply made from notes from the major triad, but has mutated many times throughout the whole fugue.

== Bibliography ==
- Riemann, Hugo (1890). Analysis of J.S. Bach's Wohltemperirtes Clavier : (48 preludes & fugues). Vol. 2. Translated by Shedlock, John South. London: Augener & Co.
- Ledbetter, David (2002). Bach's Well-tempered Clavier: The 48 Preludes and Fugues. Yale University Press. ISBN 978-0-300-09707-8. JSTOR j.ctt1npnnf.
