= Lute Suite in E minor, BWV 996 =

Musical composition

Lute Suite in E minor, BWV 996, is a musical composition written by Johann Sebastian Bach between 1708 and 1717. It is probable that this suite was intended for the lautenwerk (lute-harpsichord). Because the lautenwerk is an uncommon instrument, it is in modern times often performed on the guitar or the lute.

== Musical structure ==
Lute Suite in E minor, BWV 996, played on a lute-harpsichord (lautenwerck)
I. Präludium; Presto

II. Allemande

III. Courante

IV. Sarabande

V. Bourrée

VI. Gigue
Performed by Martha Goldstein

The work consists of six movements:

1. Präludium: Presto
2. Allemande
3. Courante
4. (Sarabande)
5. Bourrée
6. (Gigue)

== Instrumentation ==
Bach wrote his lute pieces in a traditional score rather than in lute tablature, and if the work is intended for the lautenwerk, it would have been played on a keyboard. No original script of the Suite in E minor for Lute by Bach is known to exist. However, in the collection of one of Bach's pupils, Johann Ludwig Krebs, there is one piece ("Praeludio – con la Suite da Gio: Bast. Bach") that has written "aufs Lauten Werck" ("for the lute-harpsichord") in unidentified handwriting.

Some argue that despite the annotation about the lute-harpsichord, the piece was meant to be played on the lute, as demonstrated by the texture. Others argue that since the piece was written in E minor, it would be incompatible with the baroque lute, which was tuned to D minor unless a capo was on the 2nd fret. Nevertheless, it may be played with other string instruments, such as the guitar, mandola, or mandocello, and keyboard instruments (such as piano), and the fifth movement (the bourrée) is especially well known among guitarists.

== See also ==
- Bourrée in E minor, other uses of the fifth movement bourrée from this suite in classical and popular music
