= French Suites (Bach) =

Collection of keyboard works by Johann Sebastian Bach

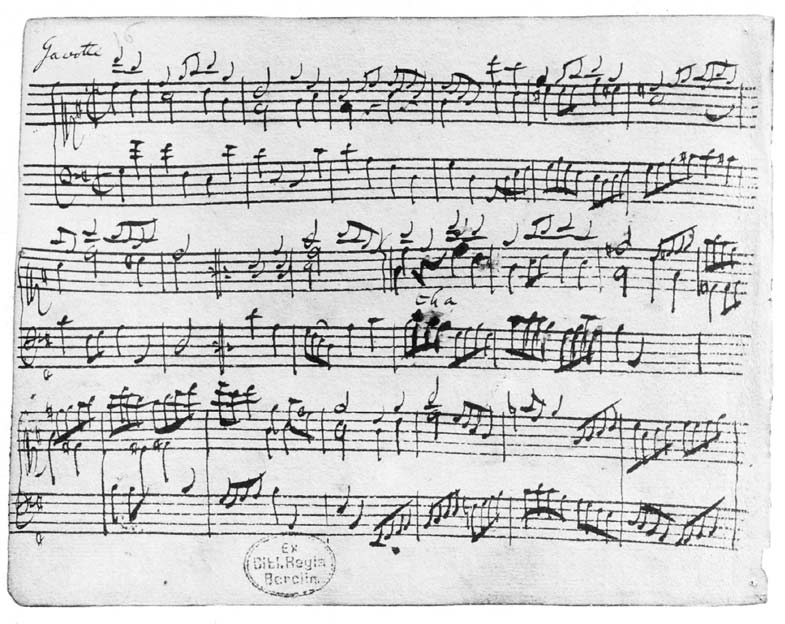
Gavotte from French Suite No. 5

The French Suites, BWV 812–817, are six suites that Johann Sebastian Bach wrote for the clavier (harpsichord or clavichord) between the years of 1722 and 1725. Although Suites Nos. 1 to 4 are typically dated to 1722, it is possible that the first was written somewhat earlier.

== Style ==
The suites were later given the name 'French' (first recorded usage by Friedrich Wilhelm Marpurg in 1762). Likewise, the English Suites received a later appellation. The name was popularised by Bach's biographer Johann Nikolaus Forkel, who wrote in his 1802 biography of Bach, "One usually calls them French Suites because they are written in the French manner." This claim, however, is inaccurate: like Bach's other suites, they follow a largely Italian convention. There is no surviving definitive manuscript of these suites, and ornamentation varies both in type and in degree across manuscripts. The courantes of the first (in D minor) and third (in B minor) suites are in the French style; the courantes of the other four suites are all in the Italian style. In any case, Bach also employed dance movements (such as the polonaise of the sixth suite) that are foreign to the French manner. Usually, the swift second movement after the allemande is named either courante (French style) or corrente (Italian style), but in all these suites the second movements are named courante, according to the Bach catalog listing, which supports the suggestion that these suites are "French". Some of the manuscripts that have come down to us are titled "Suites Pour Le Clavecin", which is what probably led to the tradition of calling them "French" Suites.

Two additional suites, one in A minor (BWV 818), the other in E♭ major (BWV 819), are linked to the familiar six in some manuscripts. The Overture in the French style, BWV 831, which Bach published as the second part of Clavier-Übung, is a suite in the French style but not connected to the French suites. Some manuscripts have movements not found in other copies. These movements are probably spurious.

== Movements ==
=== Suite No. 1 in D minor, BWV 812 ===
1. Allemande
2. Courante
3. Sarabande
4. Menuet I
5. Menuet II
6. Gigue

=== Suite No. 2 in C minor, BWV 813 ===
1. Allemande
2. Courante
3. Sarabande
4. Air
5. Menuet
6. Menuet – Trio (in BWV 813a)
7. Gigue

=== Suite No. 3 in B minor, BWV 814 ===
French Suite No. 3 in B minor (MIDI realization)
I. Allemande

II. Courante

III. Sarabande

IV. Gavotte (Angloise)

V. Menuet

VI. Trio

VII. Gigue

1. Allemande
2. Courante
3. Sarabande
4. Angloise
5. Menuet – Trio
6. Gigue

=== Suite No. 4 in E♭ major, BWV 815 ===
1. Allemande
2. Courante
3. Sarabande
4. Gavotte
5. Air
6. Menuet
7. Gigue

Suite No. 4 also exists in an alternative version, published as BWV 815a, which includes three additional movements: a Prelude, a second Gavotte and a Menuet.

=== Suite No. 5 in G major, BWV 816 ===
French Suite No. 5 in G major (MIDI realization)
I. Allemande

II. Courante

III. Sarabande

IV. Gavotte

V. Bourrée

VI. Loure

VII. Gigue

1. Allemande
2. Courante
3. Sarabande
4. Gavotte
5. Bourrée
6. Loure
7. Gigue

The first few bars of this suite were written in 1722 for Bach's second wife, but it was not completed until 1723. The Gigue, as often, is in fugal style, in binary form. The voices enter in descending order (Soprano-Alto-Bass), while in the second half of the piece the voices not only enter in opposite order but also an inversion of the 1st subject.

=== Suite No. 6 in E major, BWV 817 ===
French Suite No. 6 in E major (MIDI realization)
I. Allemande

II. Courante

III. Sarabande

IV. Gavotte

V. Polonaise

VI. Bourrée

VII. Menuet

VIII. Gigue

1. Allemande
2. Courante
3. Sarabande
4. Gavotte
5. Polonaise
6. Bourrée
7. Menuet
8. Gigue

== Legacy ==
The Minuet from Suite No. 3 in B-minor BWV 814 was provided as one of three soundtrack options in Nintendo's Game Boy version of Tetris.

== See also ==
- Works for keyboard by Johann Sebastian Bach
- Partitas, BWV 825–830
- English Suites, BWV 806–811
- Bach compositions printed during the composer's lifetime
