= Six Little Preludes (Bach) =

Preludes written by Johann Sebastian Bach

The Six Little Preludes (BWV 933-938) are a group of preludes written by the composer Johann Sebastian Bach for harpsichord. They are all short, pedagogical efforts written in or around the period of 1717–1720, but they were not published until 1802. These pieces are all short but require a strong understanding of technique. The preludes are a part of Bach's 18 Kleine Präludien (18 Little Preludes), which also contains the Twelve Little Preludes. Bach sporadically produced the pieces around 1717–1720, primarily for instructive purposes. They were not intended for public performance, rather as an aid to his son's compositional development.

== Little Prelude in C major, BWV 933 ==
Little Prelude in C major, BWV 933 played on a harpsichord by Gérard Janot

The C major prelude consists of two brief sections, repeated as a pair, followed by a variation on each section, again repeated as a pair. The first segment demands complete independence of the right and left hands, with the left hand providing a busy accompaniment. The bass material becomes more rudimentary in the second segment, as the treble adopts f of this prelude makes minimal changes to the basic material, mainly brightening it by lifting the slightly altered melody into a higher register.

== Little Prelude in C minor, BWV 934 ==
Little Prelude in C Minor, BWV 934 played on a harpsichord by Gérard Janot

This C minor effort is similar to a minuet. It features a lively angular theme. The theme and second subject are played through twice and vary considerably on their third appearance. This piece generally lasts just over a minute if no repetitions are performed.

== Little Prelude in D minor, BWV 935 ==
The Little Prelude in D minor contains features that are similar to a two-part invention. This work generally lasts about a minute and a half. This prelude is one of the more difficult ones of the set, featuring a constant flurry of notes. The second section of this piece deals with keys of F major and G minor, before transitioning back to the dark key of D minor.

== Little Prelude in D major, BWV 936 ==
This Prelude has features associated with a trio sonata: it contains two upper lines and a roving bass part underpinning them. The work opens with a lively theme. It is played through twice, then varied on its third appearance, showing much development.

== Little Prelude in E major, BWV 937 ==
Unlike Prelude in E minor, this piece is interpreting a more lively scenario indicating that it is major, though Bach's frequently used mordents are not as common in this prelude.

== Little Prelude in E minor, BWV 938 ==
This E minor prelude contains features similar to the composer's inventions. Bach follows a pattern used in many of the pieces in the set, in presenting the main thematic material twice in more or less the same form, then developing it. This piece is approximately one-and-a-half minutes long.

== In popular culture ==
In the puzzle game Portal 2 by Valve, a transposed version of Little Prelude in C minor, titled "Machiavellian Bach", is featured in the game's soundtrack during a segment towards the latter half of the game's story.
