= Prelude and Fugue in C major, BWV 870 =

Keyboard composition by Johann Sebastian Bach

The Prelude and Fugue in C major, BWV 870, is a keyboard composition written by Johann Sebastian Bach. It is the first prelude and fugue in the second book of The Well-Tempered Clavier, a series of 48 preludes and fugues in every major and minor key.

== Analysis ==
=== Prelude ===
Unlike the Prelude in C major, BWV 846, that opens book 1 of the Well-Tempered Clavier, which consists mostly of broken chords, this prelude features a continuously flowing sequence of melodic ideas that Cecil Gray (1938, p. 82) says is "very much freer and subtler in form and procedure." Ledbetter (2002, p. 28) compares it to "an organ improvisation". According to Levinson (1997, p. 88), "few pieces of traditional music are more purely processive than this. It develops without break or pause, without arrivals of significance, from beginning to end." Tovey (1951, p. 21) sees this prelude as being "full of the double meanings obtainable on keyboard instruments by holding the notes of a melody so that they grow into sustained chords (bar 3) and, on the other hand, by allowing two separate parts to combine in a melodic sense different from that of either":

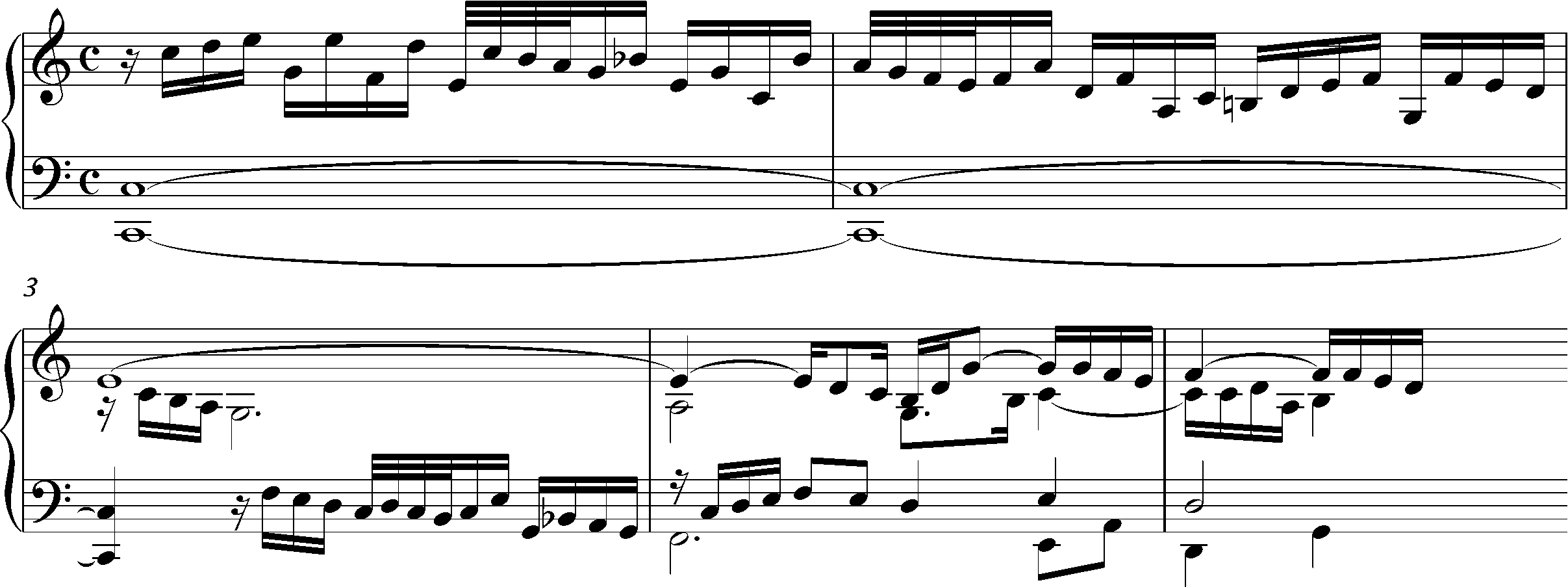
Prelude, bars 1–5

The uninterrupted flow of notes tends to conceal the fact that the prelude as a whole is carefully constructed. Tovey continues, "with the middle of bar 5, the design begins to develop":

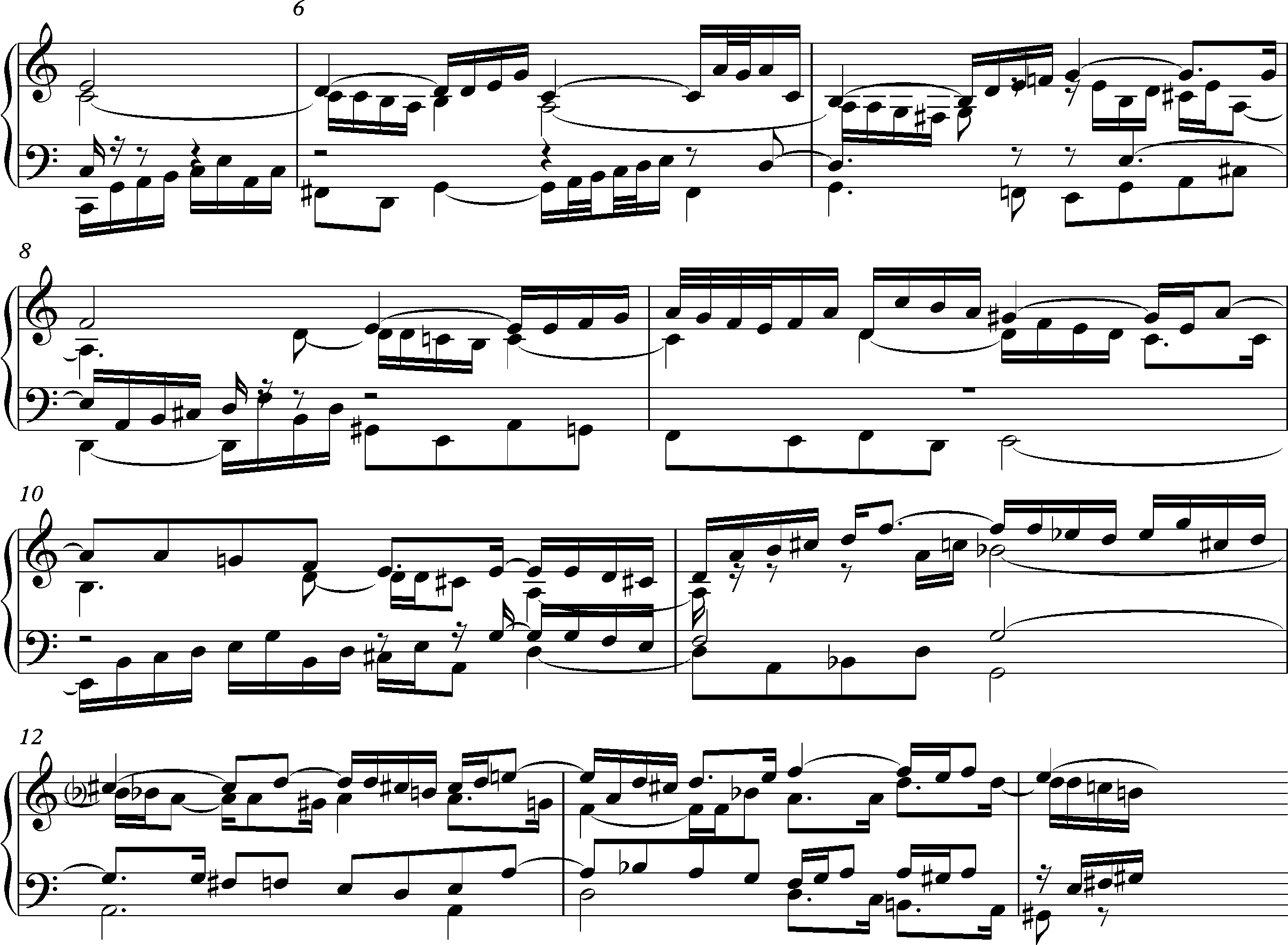
Prelude, bars 5–14

A linking section passes seamlessly through a series of related keys in bars 14 to 19:

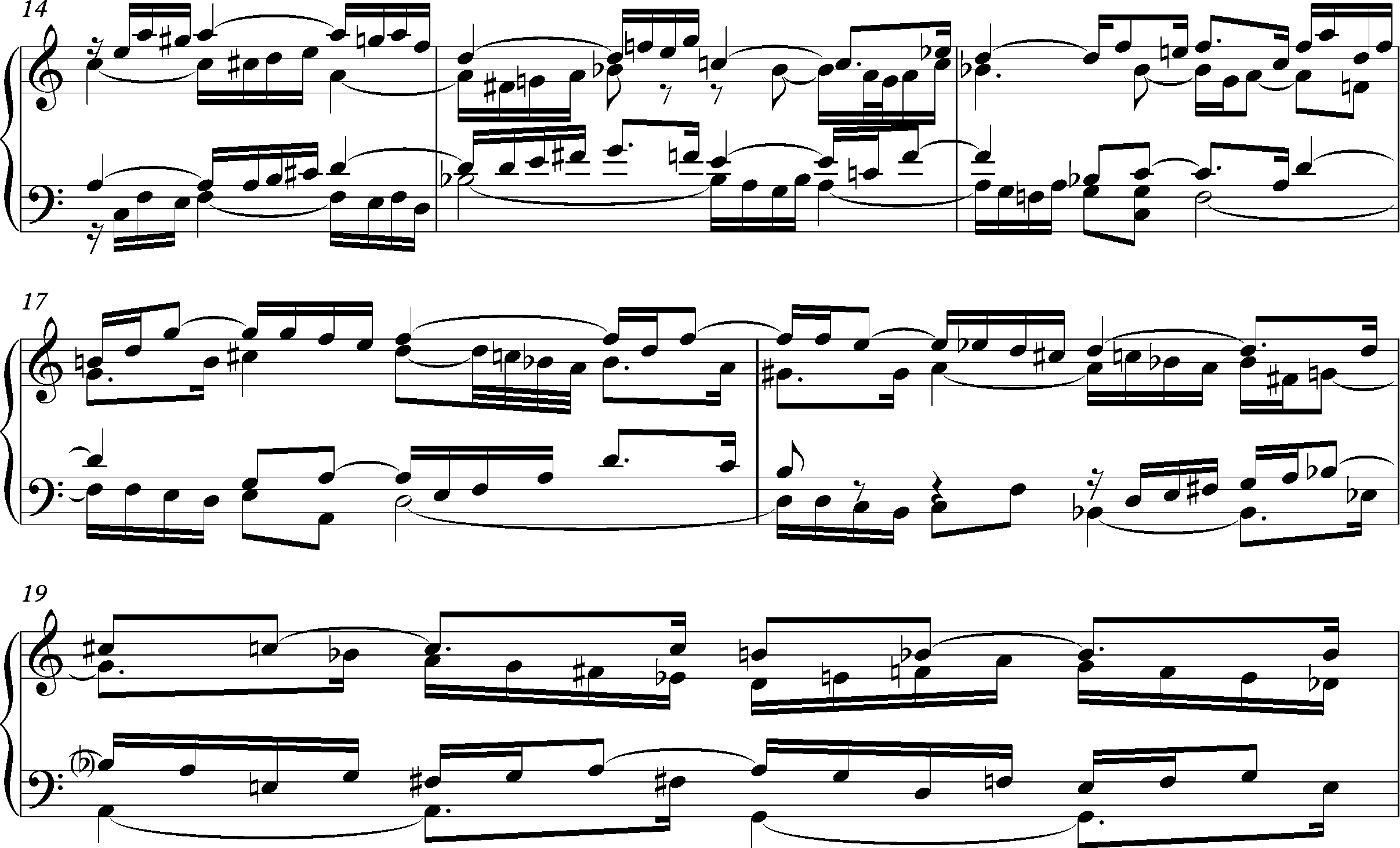
Prelude, bars 14–19

The entire passage of bars 5 to 13 is then repeated, with some small alterations, a perfect fourth higher in bars 20 to 28:

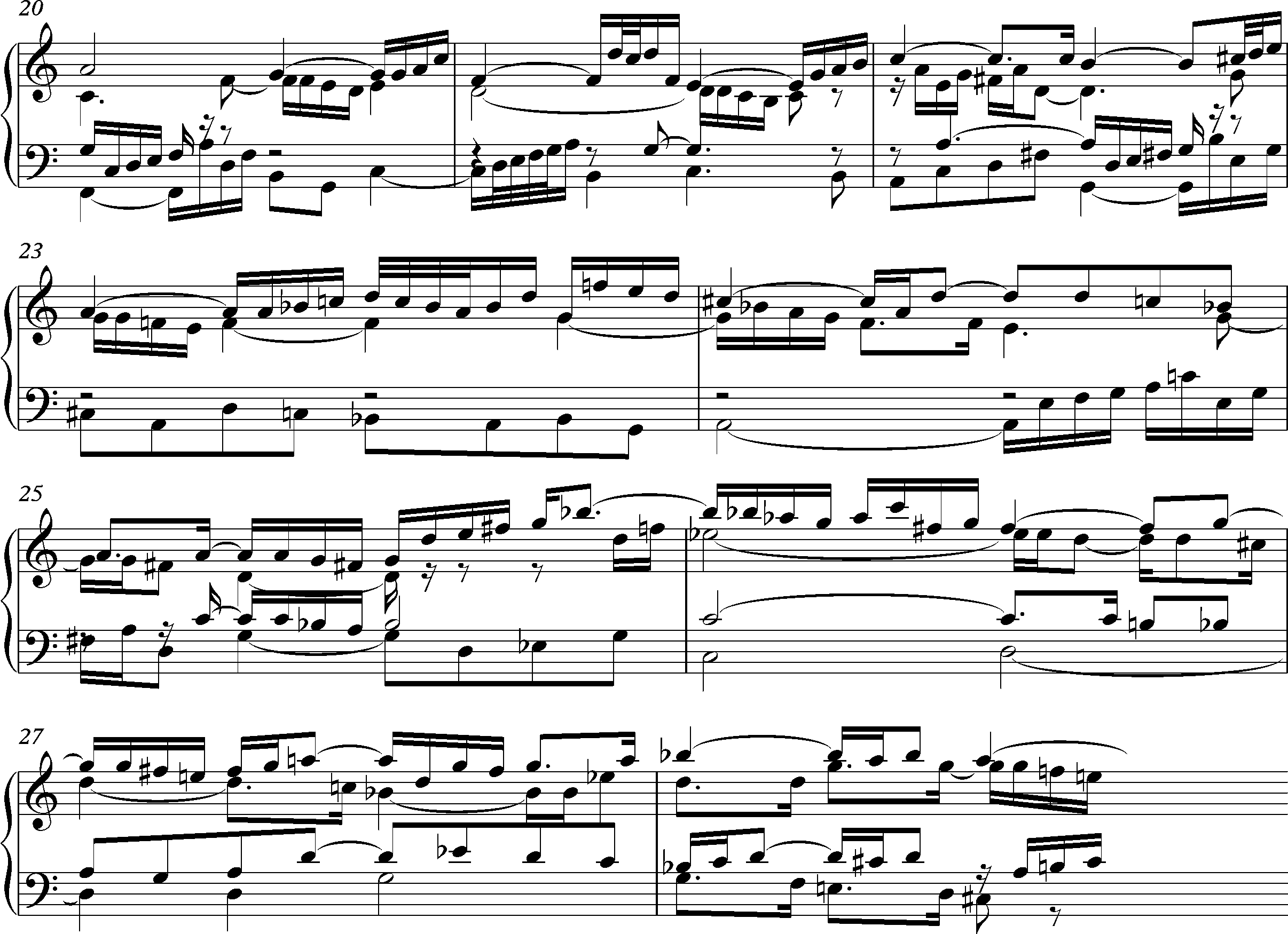
Prelude, bars 20–28

The concluding bars follow, with a final cadence in C major, the only decisive point of arrival in the entire piece:

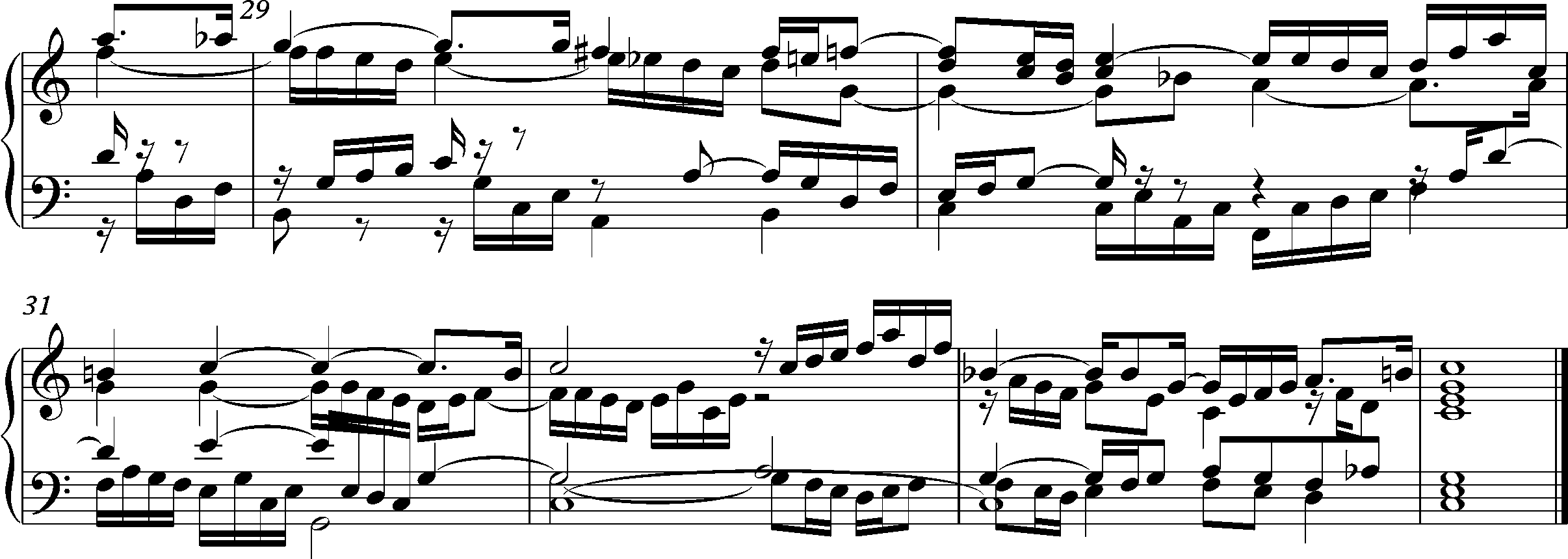
Prelude, concluding bars

=== Fugue ===
The fugue is 83 bars long and is written for three voices. It starts with a 4 measure subject in the alto voice:

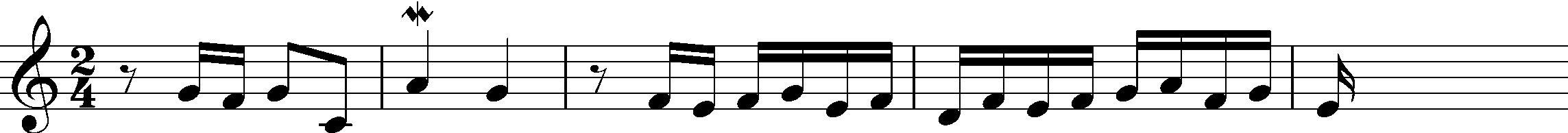
Fugue subject

The subject is then followed with entries in the soprano and bass voices. According to Tovey "the Fugue reaches a climax in a spirited Coda":

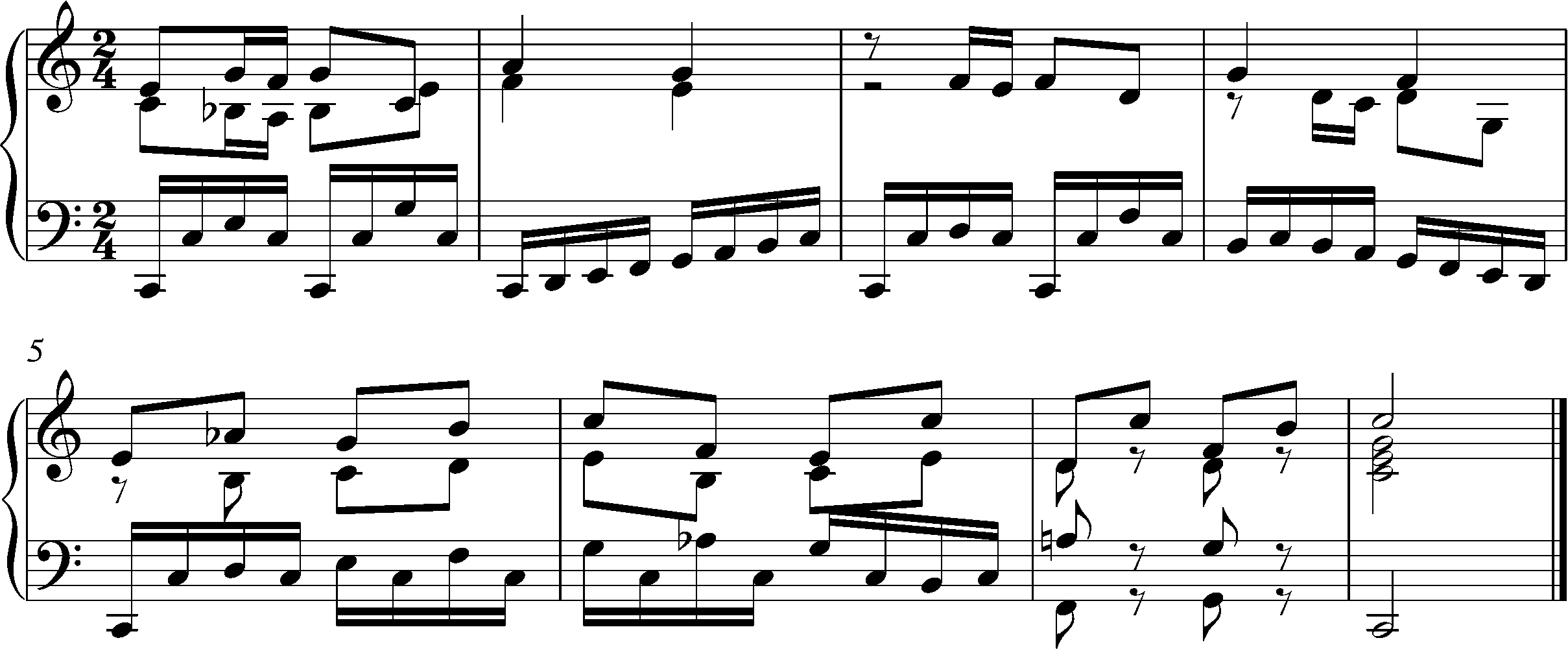
Fugue concluding bars

Tovey asks us to "note Bach's favourite device of cumulative repetition in the tonic" which contributes to "the sonorous vigour of the last eight bars."

== Legacy ==
A recording by Glenn Gould was included on the Voyager Golden Record, sent into space in 1977 affixed to the Voyager 1 and Voyager 2 spacecraft. It is one of 27 musical compositions included on the record in a time capsule for any extraterrestrial life that may locate either craft.
