= Prelude and Fugue in G minor, BWV 861 =

Keyboard composition by Johann Sebastian Bach

The Prelude and Fugue in G minor, BWV 861, is No. 16 in Johann Sebastian Bach's Well-Tempered Clavier Book I, keyboard music consisting of 24 preludes and fugues in every major and minor key.

Bach's G minor fugue is "insistent and pathetic". The subject also appears in his funeral cantata Gottes Zeit ist die allerbeste Zeit (God's time is the very best time). The subject of the fugue employs a minor 6th leap in the first measure, then resolves it with a more conventional stepwise motion. Overall, the piece has a foreboding and admonishing tone.

== Harmonic analysis ==
Prelude and Fugue No. 16 in G minor BWV 861 from The Well-Tempered Clavier, Book 1 – piano performance by Kimiko Ishizaka
Prelude

Fugue

The prelude and the fugue of BWV 861 are set in G minor. Although no modulations are present, there are multiple times that the key deviates to the dominant.

=== Prelude ===
The first two measures of the prelude are an elaboration of tonic. There is a chain of suspensions in m. 3 that leads to the secondary dominant (A major) that leads to the dominant (D major), which then leads back to tonic (G minor). The 5th measure begins with a ii-V-I progression and leads to a C dominant seventh chord.

This marks the beginning of a series of modulations moving up a fourth each time. He modulates twice, arriving in B♭ major for the recapitulation of the opening theme in m. 1. A G dominant seventh chord is used in the fourth beat of m 8. Measure 9 marks the beginning of a sequence that lasts two measures and further establishes C minor as tonic. There is another recapitulation of the opening measure in mm. 11, this time in C minor. There is a diminished triad on beat 3 of mm. 12 and a D dominant seventh on the fourth beat as we prepare to modulate back to G minor. There is another C minor chord on the third beat of mm. 13, which turns into a Neapolitan sixth when the top line lands on an A♭ on the fourth beat. The next measure begins on D, which leads to G minor for the second beat.

Tonic (G minor) is then elaborated until mm. 17. There is another Neapolitan chord that leads to a diminished chord on the raised fourth scale degree, providing a leading tone to the D dominant seventh chord with a 4-3 suspension in the soprano. The penultimate measure begins with a pedal tone that last till the end of the prelude. The G minor chord is turned into a G dominant seventh as it modulates to C minor, then a C diminished triad with the pedal tone G in the bass still. Finally, the dissonance is resolved and the piece ends with a Picardy third.

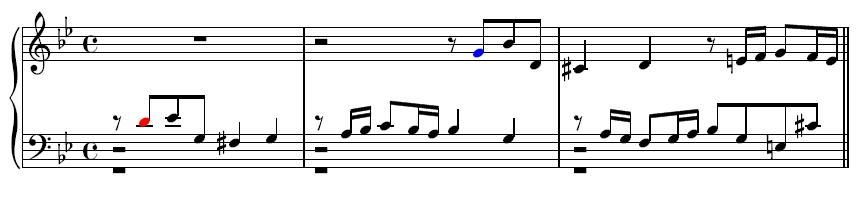
Example of a tonal answer in a fugal exposition, in which the second theme is slightly modified

=== Fugue ===
The subject of the fugue begins in G minor. The second voice enters on the pickup to the fourth beat of m. 2, and it begins in the dominant (D minor), even though the first note of the theme is a G in this instance. The third voice enters in m. 5 in the tonic and the fourth a measure later in the dominant once again. The first episode begins in D and modulates to the B♭ major for the recapitulation of the subject. The second episode is in G minor.

== Sources ==
- Bach Digital Work Nos. 01016 and 01017 at www.bachdigital.de
- Boalch, Donald Howard; Mould, Charles; Roth, Andreas H. (1995). Makers of the harpsichord and clavichord 1440-1840 (3rd Edition). Clarendon Press
- Dickinson, Alan Edgar Frederic (1956). Bach's Fugal Works, with an Account of Fugue Before and After Bach. I. Pitman and Sons
- Dürr, Alfred (1989). New Bach Edition Series V: Keyboard and Lute Works Volume 6.1: Das Wohltemperierte Klavier I, Score and Critical Commentary Bärenreiter
- Lowrance, Rachel A. (2003). "Instruction, Devotion, and Affection: Three Roles of Bach’s Well-Tempered Clavier". Musical Offerings, Vol. 4, No. 1
