= Prelude and Fugue in C minor, BWV 847 =

1722 keyboard composition by Johann Sebastian Bach

The Prelude and Fugue in C minor, BWV 847, is a keyboard composition written by Johann Sebastian Bach. It is the second prelude and fugue in the first book of The Well-Tempered Clavier, a series of 48 preludes and fugues by the composer.

== Analysis ==
=== Prelude ===
The prelude is 38 bars long, and consists mostly of a sequence of a repeating motif of running sixteenth notes in the form of broken chords in both hands. Below are the first four bars of the prelude:

The prelude continues like so for 33 bars, with different harmony and changes of key. The coda begins at the 34th bar, where a sudden change of texture and tempo occurs. In the first bar of the coda, an arpeggiated chord is followed by a rapid succession of thirty-second notes. This new motif is repeated twice, after which a succession of sixteenth notes ends the prelude on a Picardy third.

=== Fugue ===
The fugue is 31 bars long, and is written for 3 voices. Below is the two measure subject of the fugue, which starts in the middle voice:

Just like most fugues in the baroque period, the subject is then repeated in the top voice in the dominant key (G minor), and then repeated once more in the lowest voice, again in the home key of C minor. The fugue then continues with a development, and then another repetition of the subject in the home key. Just like the prelude, the fugue ends with a Picardy third.

== Samples ==
Stevie Wonder's "Pastime Paradise", from his album Songs in the Key of Life, is reported to use the prelude's opening bars as the backbone for its repeated chord progression throughout the song.
