= Lute Suite in C minor, BWV 997 =

Suite by Johann Sebastian Bach

The Lute Suite in C minor, BWV 997, by Johann Sebastian Bach, exists in two versions:

- BWV 997.1 – 1st version, composed before its earliest extant manuscript copy was written 1738–1741, for Lautenwerk (lute-harpsichord)
- BWV 997.2 – 2nd version, for lute: the arrangement is not by Bach.

== Movements ==
Lute Suite in C minor, BWV 997
I. Prelude

II. Fuge

III. Sarabande

IV. Gigue – Double
Performed on a lautenwerck (lute harpsichord) by Martha Goldstein

Transcription for flute and harpsichord
I. Prelude

II. Fuge

III. Sarabande

IV. Gigue – Double
Performed by Alex Murray (flute) and Martha Goldstein (harpsichord)

It has five movements:

1. Preludio
2. Fuga
3. Sarabande
4. Gigue
5. Double (variation on the gigue) – If the double is counted as a separate movement.
