= Prelude, Fugue and Allegro in E-flat major, BWV 998 =

Prelude, Fugue, and Allegro in E♭ major, BWV 998, is a musical composition written by Johann Sebastian Bach for Lute or Harpsichord. The piece was written around 1735. The original manuscript with the title "Prelude pour la Luth. ò Cembal. par J.S. Bach" was sold at Christie's on July 13, 2016, for £2,518,500.

== Structure ==
Prelude, Fugue and Allegro in E♭ major, BWV 998
1. Prelude

2. Fugue

3. Allegro
Performed on a lautenwerck (lute-harpsichord) by Martha Goldstein

=== Prelude ===
The Prelude is similar to many in The Well-Tempered Clavier (the second book of which dates from around the same time as this work), in that it is composed of many arpeggios. There is a pause in the motion when, just before the coda, there is a fermata over a third-inversion seventh chord with a rich suspension. There is a rare example of explicit consecutive fifths in the left-hand of bar 46.

=== Fugue ===
The Fugue is one of only three that Bach wrote in ternary form, with an exact repetition of its contrapuntally active opening section framing a texturally contrasting central section.

=== Allegro ===
The Allegro is a binary form dance with 16th notes.

== Arrangement for guitar ==
Arranged for guitar, it is usually played in D major with a Drop D tuning. Julian Bream played it in a BBC2 broadcast on television in early 1978 at the All Saints chapel of Wardour Castle. In 1994 he recorded it on his album Bach Guitar Recital.
