= Suite in G minor, BWV 995 =

Lute composition by Bach

The Suite in G Minor, BWV 995, was transcribed for lute by composer Johann Sebastian Bach between the spring of 1727 and the winter of 1731 from his own Cello Suite No. 5, BWV 1011. It is in six movements:

1. Präludium – Très Vite
2. Allemande
3. Courante
4. Sarabande
5. Gavotte I – Gavotte II En Rondeaux
6. Gigue

The sources for this are: an autograph manuscript by Bach, in staff notation on two staves (B-Br Ms.II 4085 MUSI.); and a version in lute tablature made from it by an unnamed lutenist (D-LEm Sammlung Becker, Ms. III.11.3).
