= Gigue =

Type of baroque dance

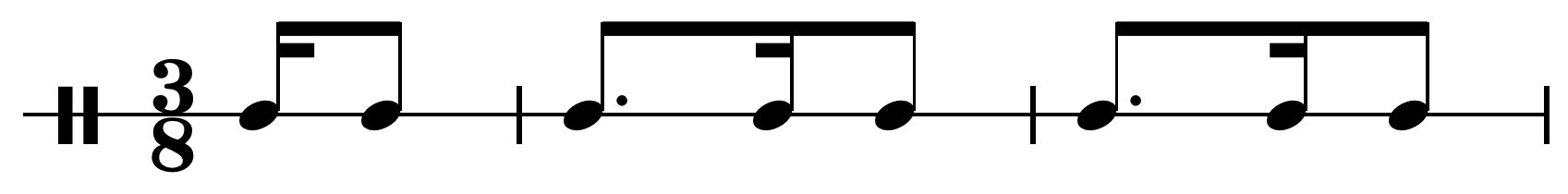
Gigue rhythm.

The gigue (/ʒiːɡ/ ZHEEG, French: [ʒiɡ]) or giga (Italian: [ˈd͡ʒiːɡa]) is a lively baroque dance originating from the English jig. It was imported into France in the mid-17th century and usually appears at the end of a suite.

The gigue was probably never a court dance, but it was danced by nobility on social occasions and several court composers wrote gigues. A gigue, like other Baroque dances, consists of two sections.

A gigue is usually in 3/8 or in one of its compound metre derivatives, such as 6/8, 6/4, 9/8 or 12/8, although there are some gigues written in other metres, as for example the gigue from Johann Sebastian Bach's first French Suite (BWV 812), which is written in 2/2 and has a distinctive strutting "dotted" rhythm.

Gigues often have a contrapuntal texture as well as often having accents on the third beats in the bar, making the gigue a lively folk dance.

In early French theatre, it was customary to end a play's performance with a gigue, complete with music and dancing.

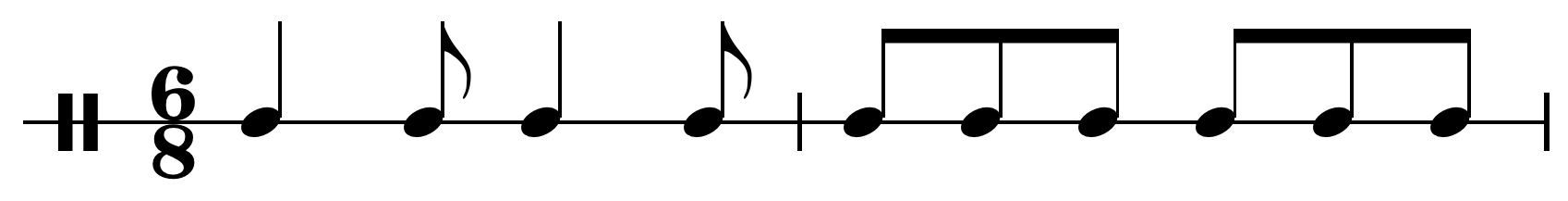
Another gigue rhythm.

== Etymology ==
An early Italian dance called the giga probably derives its name from a small accompanying stringed instrument called the giga. Historians, such as Charles Read Baskerville, claim that use of the word in relation to dancing took place in England prior to such usage on the Continent. Giga probably has a separate etymology.

== Pachelbel's Canon and Gigue ==
Pachelbel's Canon by the German Baroque composer Johann Pachelbel was originally paired with a gigue under the title Canon and Gigue for 3 violins and basso continuo. Both movements are in the key of D major.

The gigue is set in 12/8 time and consists of 2 equal sections of 10 bars each. Unlike the canon, the gigue neither has a repeating bass voice nor a set chord progression. The gigue exhibits fugal writing, with each section introducing a brief melodic statement which is then imitated in the other voices.

== In popular culture ==
Jonathan Littell's 2006 novel The Kindly Ones is structured in different parts, each one of these named after a Baroque dance, the last part being called Gigue.

== See also ==
- Jig (folk dance)
- Loure (slow gigue)
