= Twelve Little Preludes =

19th-century compilation of short pieces

Three of the Twelve Little Preludes performed on harpsichord by Gérard Janot:
No. 2 (BWV 939)
Prelude in C major

No. 3 (BWV 999)
Prelude in C minor

No. 5 (BWV 926)
Prelude in D minor

Twelve Little Preludes (French: Douze petits Préludes; German: Zwölf kleine Praeludien), BWV 924–930, 939–942 and 999, is a 19th-century compilation of short pieces, collected from various 18th-century manuscripts written by Johann Sebastian Bach and others. Notwithstanding their diverse origin and characteristics, they were published as a set of twelve keyboard preludes by Bach in, amongst others, the 36th volume of the Bach-Gesellschaft Ausgabe (BGA).

Several collections of short keyboard preludes by Bach were published for didactic purposes from the 19th century. In the 20th century Ferruccio Busoni combined the Twelve Little Preludes with the Six Little Preludes, BWV 933–938 into a set of 18 little preludes.

== History ==
Collections of short keyboard preludes by Johann Sebastian Bach had been around since the 18th century. For instance the Six Little Preludes, BWV 933–938 are found as a group of six in manuscripts before they were published as a set in the 19th century. The Twelve Little Preludes are however a 19th-century compilation extracted from two manuscripts, the Klavierbüchlein für Wilhelm Friedemann Bach, and the composite manuscript P 804 (known as the Kellner Collection) of the Berlin State Library, both with dozens of works by various composers and written down by multiple known and unknown scribes.

The date of origin of the pieces in the Twelve Little Preludes collection is presumed to be around the first half of the 1720s, that is the period of Bach's later years in Köthen and his first years in Leipzig, where he had become Thomaskantor in 1723. In January 1720 he had started the Klavierbüchlein (keyboard-booklet) for his eldest son Wilhelm Friedemann, who was nine years old at that time.

=== Pieces from Wilhelm Friedemann Bach's Klavierbüchlein ===
Seven of the Twelve Little Preludes were adopted from Wilhelm Friedemann's Klavierbüchlein:

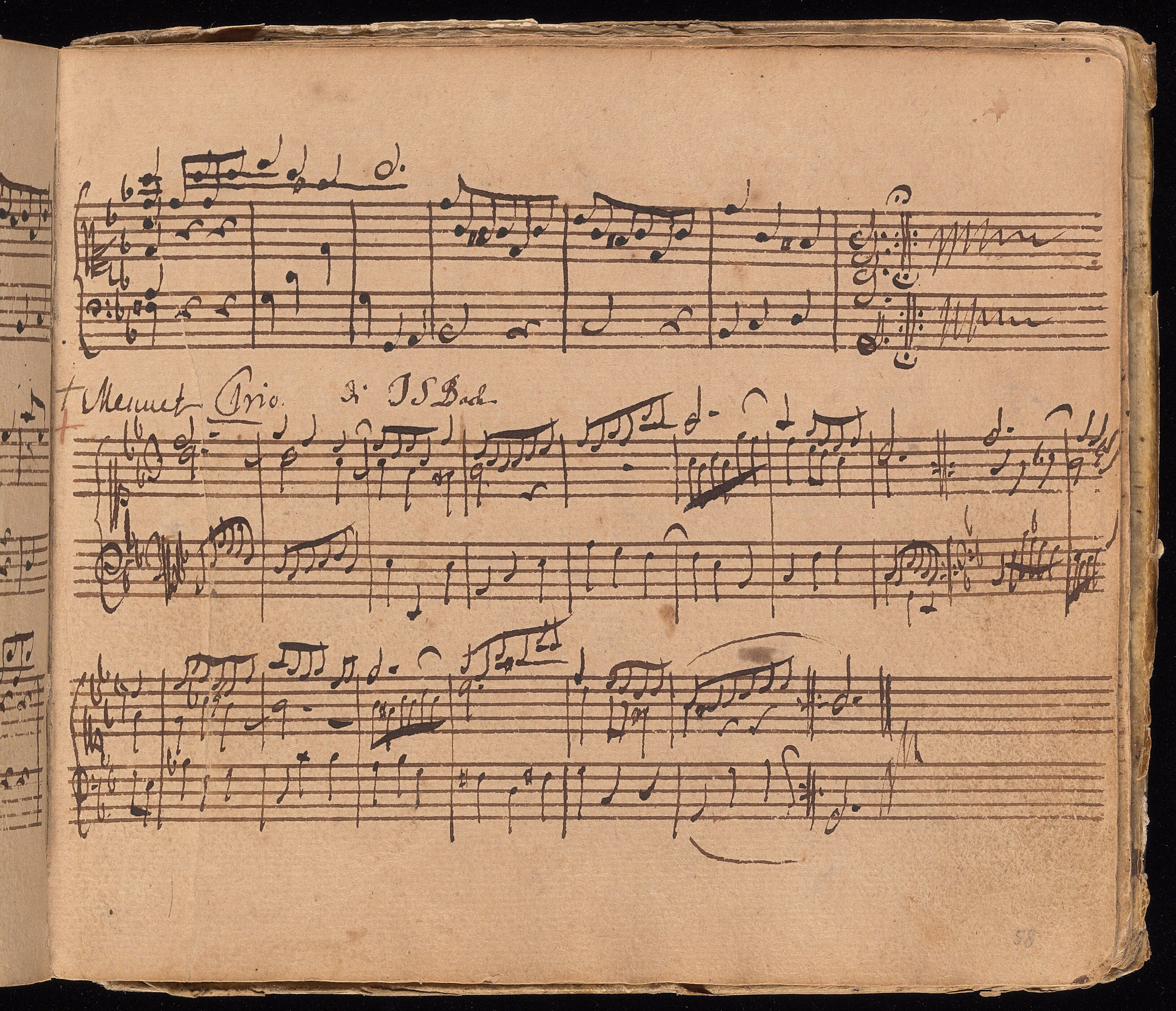
BWV 929 (Menuet-Trio) in its original environment: a postlude to someone else's composition, rather than a prelude (p. 58r of Klavierbüchlein für Wilhelm Friedemann Bach)

- BWV 924 (No. 2 in the Klavierbüchlein) → Twelve Little Preludes No. 1
- BWV 925 (No. 27 in the Klavierbüchlein) → Twelve Little Preludes No. 4
- BWV 926 (No. 4 in the Klavierbüchlein) → Twelve Little Preludes No. 5
- BWV 927 (No. 8 in the Klavierbüchlein) → Twelve Little Preludes No. 8
- BWV 928 (No. 10 in the Klavierbüchlein) → Twelve Little Preludes No. 9
- BWV 929 (No. 48^{e} in the Klavierbüchlein) → Twelve Little Preludes No. 10
- BWV 930 (No. 9 in the Klavierbüchlein) → Twelve Little Preludes No. 11

BWV 925 may have been composed by Wilhelm Friedemann (it has the number BR A 45 in the catalogue of the compositions of that composer). BWV 929 is not actually a Prelude: it is a Trio composed for a Minuet by Gottfried Heinrich Stölzel. All other pieces extracted from W. F. Bach's Klavierbüchlein are titled "Praeambulum" or "Praeludium" (both Latin expressions translated as "Prelude") in the manuscript. Together with BWV 931 and 932 (Nos. 29 and 28 in the Klavierbüchlein) this set is also known as Neun kleine Präludien aus dem Klavierbüchlein für Wilhelm Friedemann Bach (nine little preludes from the keyboard-booklet for Wilhelm Friedemann Bach).

Other preludes contained in the Klavierbüchlein:

- No. 3: chorale prelude Wer nur den lieben Gott lässt walten, BWV 691 (also included in the Kirnberger Collection of chorale preludes, and as No. 11 in the 1725 Notebook for Anna Magdalena Bach)
- No. 5: chorale prelude Jesu, meine Freude, BWV 753 (unfinished)
- Nos. 14–24: Praeludium 1–[11], BWV 846a, 847/1, 851/1, 850/1, 855a/1, 854/1, 856/1, 848/1, 849/1, 853/1 and 857/1. These are (early versions of) preludes that were adopted, in a different sequence, in the Well-Tempered Clavier Book I, Nos. 1–6 and 8–12.
- No. 26: "Praeludium ex c♮", BWV 924a (variant version of BWV 924)
- Nos. 32–46: Praeambulum 1–15, BWV 772, 775, 778, 779, 781, 784, 786, 785, 783, 782, 780, 777, 776, 774 and 773. These are better known, in a different sequence, as the fifteen Two-part Inventions

The first pieces entered in the Klavierbüchlein, including BWV 924 and 926, would have originated around 1720 (although at least some of it was apparently based on earlier work). Pieces were added to the manuscript until 1726.

=== From the Five Little Preludes ===
In the Bach-Werke-Verzeichnis (BWV) Nos. 939–943 appear under the title "Fünf kleine Präludien" (Five Little Preludes). P 804, Fascicle 53, a manuscript by an unknown scribe, is the only 18th-century source for BWV 939–942. While this source does not mention a composer for these pieces, the attribution to Bach has been doubted.

- BWV 939 (Five Little Preludes No. 1) → Twelve Little Preludes No. 2
- BWV 940 (Five Little Preludes No. 2) → Twelve Little Preludes No. 6
- BWV 941 (Five Little Preludes No. 3) → Twelve Little Preludes No. 7
- BWV 942 (Five Little Preludes No. 4) → Twelve Little Preludes No. 12

The P 804 manuscript contained these four pieces in a different order, also containing a copy of BWV 927 (which is the only direct link to J. S. Bach, and to the preludes contained in the Klavierbüchlein, for Fascicle 53): BWV 940, 941, 939, 927, 942.

1726–27 is the assumed date of origin of BWV 939–942.

BWV 943 was printed after the Six Little Preludes in the BGA edition, so was never a part of the Twelve Little Preludes collection.

=== Prelude for Lute, BWV 999 ===
According to its only extant 18th-century manuscript the Prelude in C minor, BWV 999 is a piece composed for lute:

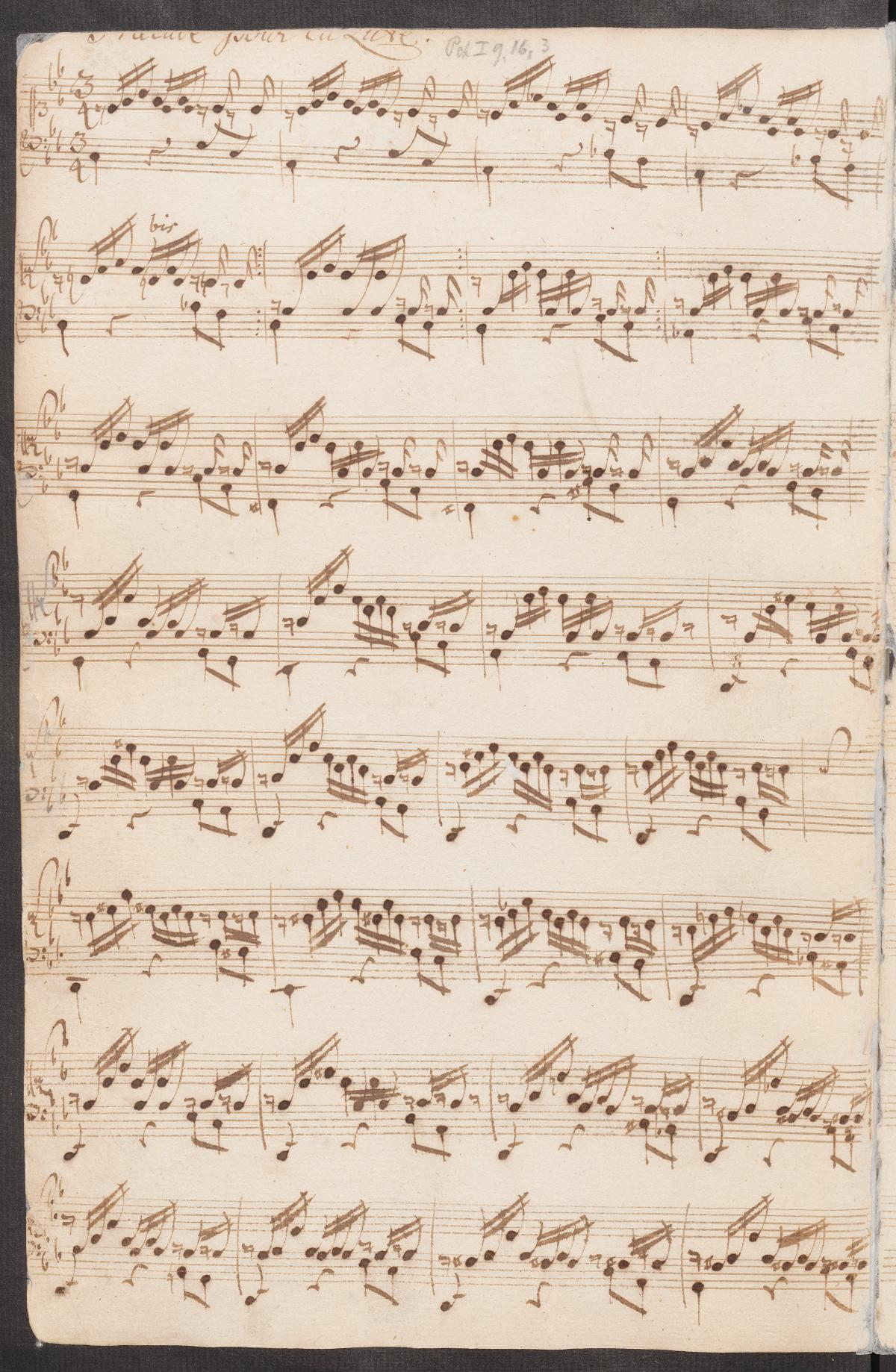
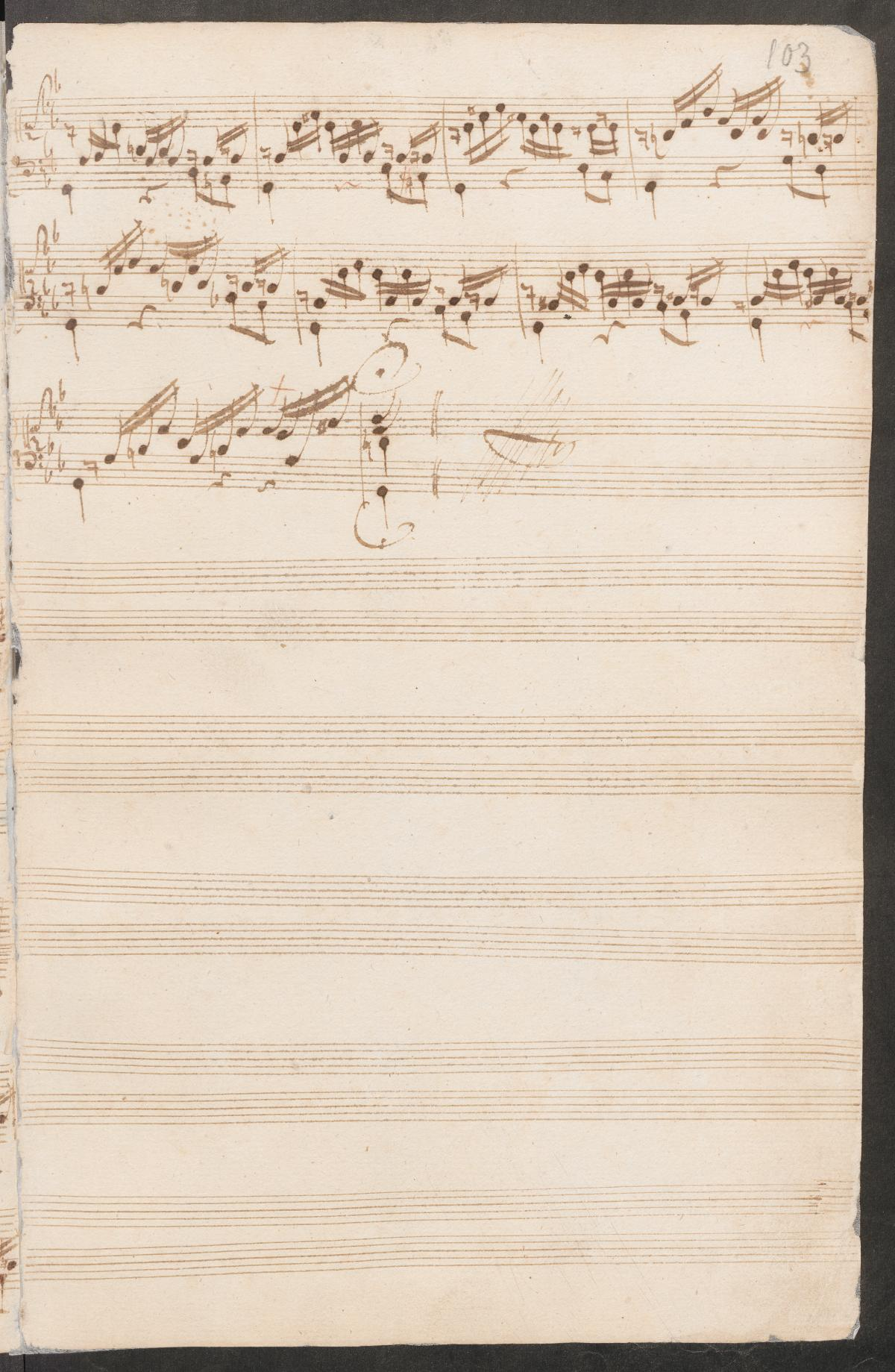

This prelude was added as No. 3 to the Twelve Little Preludes. Its composition date is estimated as c.1717–23. Its 18th-century manuscript, Fascicle 19 of P 804, is a copy by Johann Peter Kellner, produced around the middle of the 1720s or later.

== Publication ==
Peters published the Twelve Little Preludes in 1843 as "Douze petits Préludes ou Exercices pour les commençans", No. 16 in their 9th volume of Bach's complete (keyboard) works, edited by Friedrich Konrad Griepenkerl. Both this edition and pages 118 to 127 of Volume 36 of the Bach Gesellschaft edition, published in 1890, contained the pieces in this order:

1. BWV 924 – Prelude in C major (Klavierbüchlein No. 2: "Praeambulum"; Nine Little Preludes No. 1)
2. BWV 939 – Prelude in C major (Third item in P 804, Fascicle 53; Five Little Preludes No. 1)
3. BWV 999 – Prelude in C minor for lute
4. BWV 925 – Prelude in D major (Klavierbüchlein No. 27: "Praeludium ex d♮"; Nine Little Preludes No. 2)
5. BWV 926 – Prelude in D minor (Klavierbüchlein No. 4: "Praeludium"; Nine Little Preludes No. 3)
6. BWV 940 – Prelude in D minor (First item in P 804, Fascicle 53; Five Little Preludes No. 2)
7. BWV 941 – Prelude in E minor (Second item in P 804, Fascicle 53; Five Little Preludes No. 3)
8. BWV 927 – Prelude in F major (Klavierbüchlein No. 8: "Praeambulum"; Nine Little Preludes No. 4)
9. BWV 928 – Prelude in F major (Klavierbüchlein No. 10: "Praeludium"; Nine Little Preludes No. 5)
10. BWV 929 – Prelude in G minor (Klavierbüchlein No. 48^{e}: Trio for a Minuet by Stölzel; Nine Little Preludes No. 6)
11. BWV 930 – Prelude in G minor (Klavierbüchlein No. 9: "Praeambulum"; Nine Little Preludes No. 7)
12. BWV 942 – Prelude in A minor (Fifth item in P 804, Fascicle 53; Five Little Preludes No. 4)

Additionally, p. 221 of BGA Vol. 36 contains No. 26 of the Klavierbüchlein (BWV 924a), a variant version of BWV 924 in W. F. Bach's handwriting. It was probably part of the composition lessons he got from his father.

== Reception ==
Collections of Bach's Little Preludes were republished as didactical material for starting piano students, for instance at the Conservatoire Royal de Bruxelles.

Ferruccio Busoni combined the Twelve Little Preludes and the Six Little Preludes in a set of 18 kleine Präludien (18 Short Preludes), followed by the Fughetta, BWV 961, which were published as part of the Bach-Busoni Editions in 1916 (BV B 32).

When Wolfgang Schmieder compiled the Bach-Werke-Verzeichnis (first published in 1950) he split the Twelve Little Preludes in three BWV number ranges: BWV 924–930 for the Klavierbüchlein preludes (as part of the Nine Little Preludes, BWV 924–932), BWV 939–942 for the P 804 Fascicle 53 preludes (as part of the Five Little Preludes, BWV 939–942) and BWV 999 in the range of the works for lute (BWV 995–1000). Nonetheless, instead of following the collation of the original manuscripts for the keyboard works, he adhered to the 19th-century Twelve Little Preludes collation for both keyboard ranges and kept the "Trio" BWV 929 listed as a prelude in his catalogue.

The 19th-century compilation set of the Twelve Little Preludes kept its presence as a collection of piano pieces in music printing and performance in the second half of the 20th century, while other editors stayed closer to the collation in the 18th-century sources and/or that of the Bach-Werke-Verzeichnis for their presentation of Bach's short piano pieces. Also in the 21st century the Twelve Little Preludes set kept repertoire.

== Sources ==
- Schulenberg, David (2013), The Keyboard Music of J.S. Bach, Routledge, pp. 169–176, ISBN 9781136091469
