= Prelude in C minor, BWV 999 =

Composition by Johann Sebastian Bach

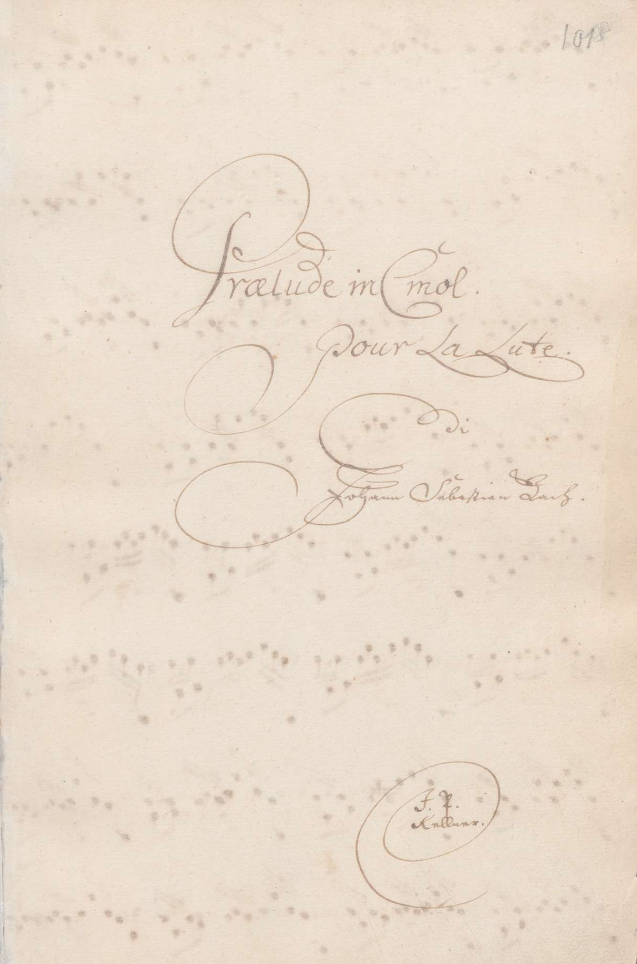
Title page of D-B Mus.ms. Bach P 804, Fascicle 19, Johann Peter Kellner's manuscript copy of the Prælude in C mol: pour La Lute.

The Prelude in C minor, BWV 999, is, according to its only extant 18th-century manuscript, a composition for lute by Johann Sebastian Bach. In the manuscript, conserved as fascicle 19 of Mus.ms. Bach P 804 at the Berlin State Library, Johann Peter Kellner wrote the piece down in keyboard notation. The time of origin of the work is not known: possibly Bach composed it in his Köthen period, that is, between 1717 and 1723, or the early years of his ensuing Leipzig period. Kellner's copy was produced after 1727, but before Bach's death in 1750.

The Prelude can be performed as well on a lute as on a keyboard. In the 19th century, it was adopted as No. 3 in the keyboard collection Twelve Little Preludes. It was grouped with Bach's lute compositions in 20th-century scholarship such as the Bach-Jahrbuch of 1931, the Bach-Werke-Verzeichnis and the New Bach Edition. It has been recorded in performances on lute, on guitar, and on keyboard instruments such as piano or harpsichord. In the 21st century, digital facsimiles of Kellner's copy became available on-line, for instance at the Bach Digital website.

== History ==
Prelude in C minor BWV 999
Played on harpsichord by Gérard Janot

According to the Bach Digital website, the time of origin of Johann Sebastian Bach's Prelude in C minor, BWV 999, is unknown. Based on Thomas Kohlhase, the 1998 edition of the Bach-Werke-Verzeichnis indicates that the piece likely originated in Bach's Köthen period, that is, between 1717 and 1723. Christoph Wolff and Walter Emery estimated that the composition may have originated from Bach's Köthen period to the early years of his Leipzig period, which began in 1723, based on similarities with the Preludes and Fugues in The Well-Tempered Clavier.

According to Kohlhase, Johann Peter Kellner's copy of the Prelude dates from around the middle of the 1720s. A more comprehensive research into the time of origin of all 57 fascicles of the Berlin State Library's Mus.ms. Bach P 804 convolute, by Russell Stinson, showed that its 19th fascicle, Kellner's copy of the BWV 999 Prelude, originated after 1727. All fascicles of the P 804 manuscript were written before Bach's death in 1750. Kellner's manuscript is the only source for the composition.

The title page of Kellner's copy of BWV 999, page 101 in the D-B Mus.ms. Bach P 804 convolute, reads:

Prælude in C mol.
pour La Lute.
di
Johann Sebastian Bach.
J. P.
Kellner.

Translation:

Prelude in C minor.
for The Lute.
by
Johann Sebastian Bach.
J[ohann] P[eter]
Kellner.

The composition is written on the next two pages, on systems of two staffs, with a soprano clef for the upper staff, and a bass clef for the lower staff. Although, in the first half of the 18th century, a tablature notation was common for lute compositions, Kellner thus wrote the Prelude down in a notation which at the time was customary for keyboard compositions. The Prelude can be performed as well on a keyboard instrument as on a lute. Kellner is known as an organist and keyboard performer: his copy of BWV 999 is the only extant instance of him taking an interest in a composition for lute.

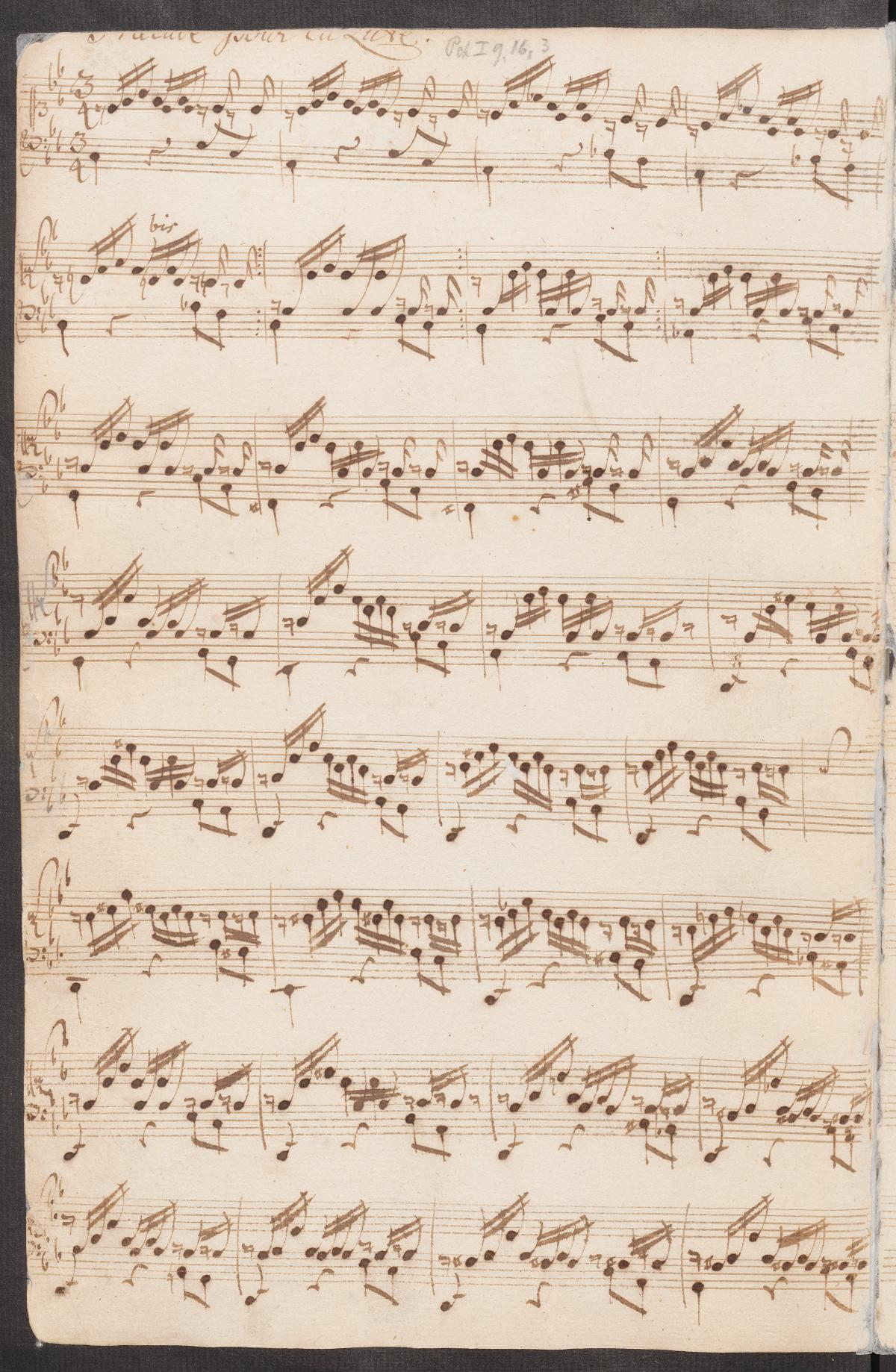
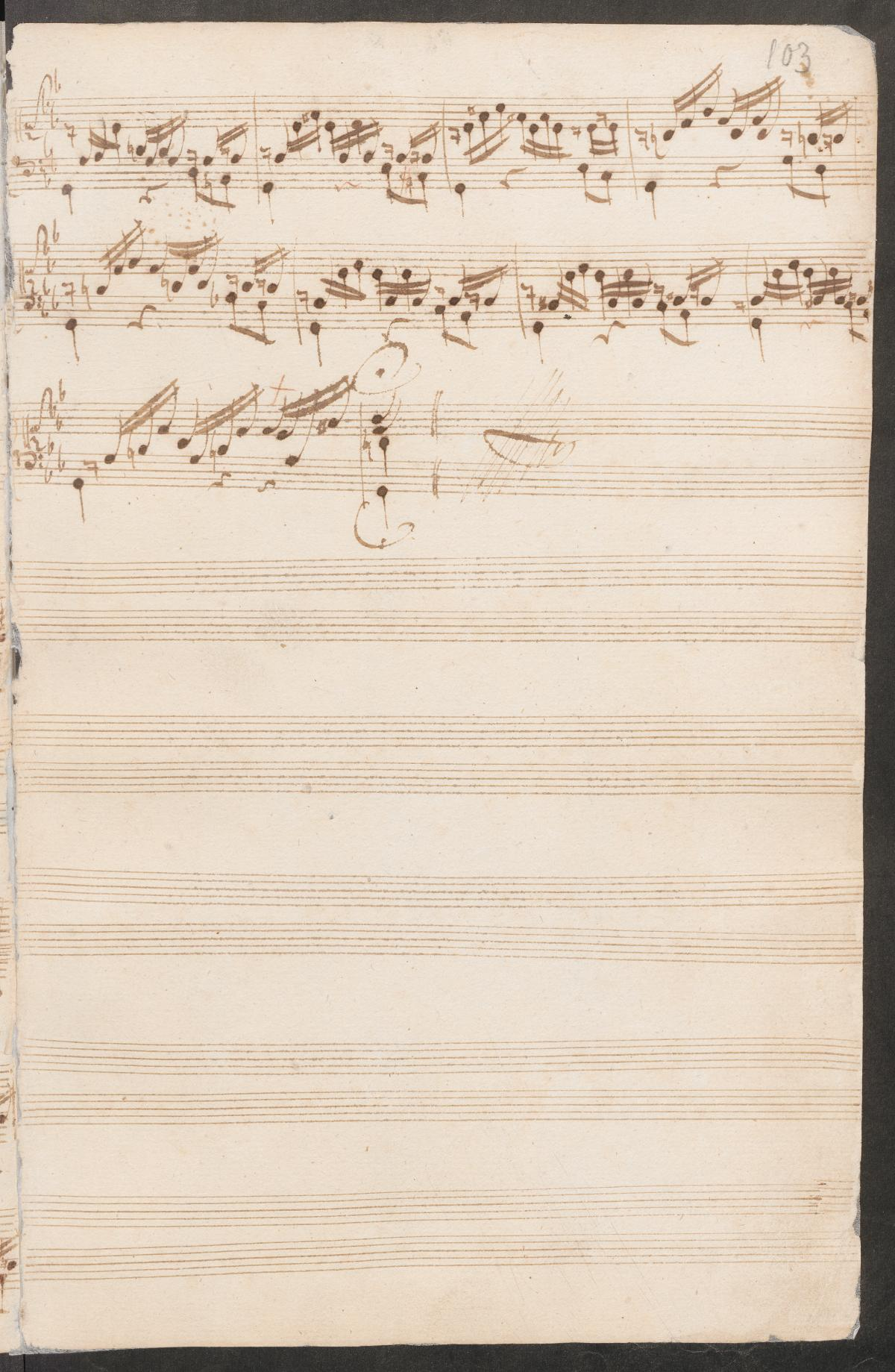
Pages 102 and 103 in D-B Mus.ms. Bach P 804, Kellner's copy of BWV 999.

A concluding section, which could follow after the Prelude as written down by Kellner, seems to be missing. The Prelude opens in C minor but instead of returning to that key (i.e., the tonic), it ends on the dominant, in fact the parallel key of the dominant, G major, while the closing chord contains a Picardy third. David Schulenberg compares this to the Prelude BWV 872a/1: after a section with arpeggios ending on the dominant, it continues with a fugato returning to the tonic. Also, the last bar of the piece only has the duration of a quarter note: it is uncommon for a piece in 3/4 to end on a bar with a different duration than three quarter notes. Whether Bach never composed such continuation of the piece, or whether Kellner didn't copy it, is not known.

== Music ==
BWV 999's brief, introductory nature (43 measures), improvisatory feel and reiteration of a defining motif fits squarely within the prelude genre of the 1710s and 1720s. Additionally, the shortness of the motif itself follows the conventions of early sixteenth-century prelude. It also served a teaching purpose characteristic of the genre, widely using arpeggiations and technical demands that served students well as an étude. Barbara Russano Hanning describes prelude features and goals: "The typical prelude assigns the player a specific task, so that the piece functions as an etude. In addition, the preludes illustrate different types of keyboard performance conventions and compositional practices." Such pedagogical traits contribute to the work's longevity; it is still an oft-used educational tool.

=== Motif ===
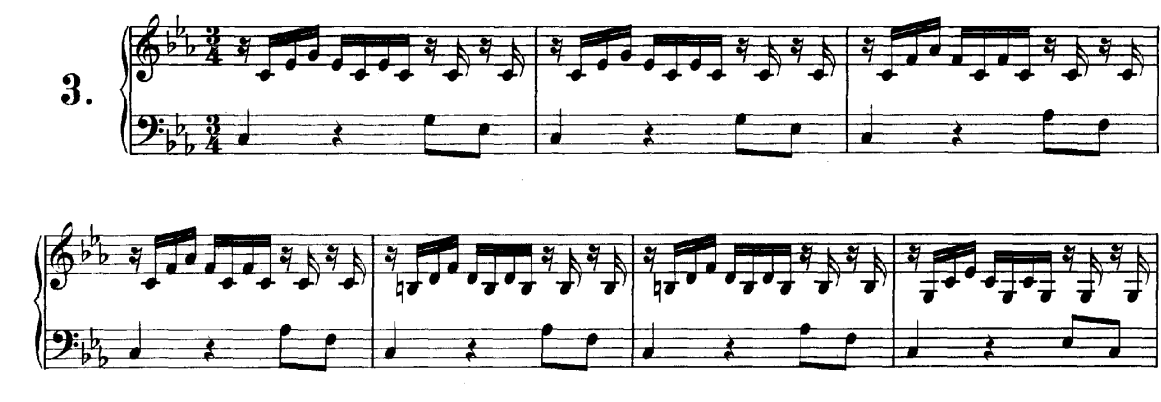
Measures 1–7 of BWV 999

The Prelude's central motif consists of intersecting rhythms between the upper and lower voice (what originally would have been the left and right hand). In the right hand, this is a sixteenth rest, followed by a seven-note sixteenth passage that typically arpeggiates an inversion of a triad (ascending and descending from and back to the root), and an alternating sixteenth rest–sixteenth note pattern in the third beat. The left participates by having a pedal tone quarter in the first beat, a rest, then two eighth notes.

=== Harmony ===
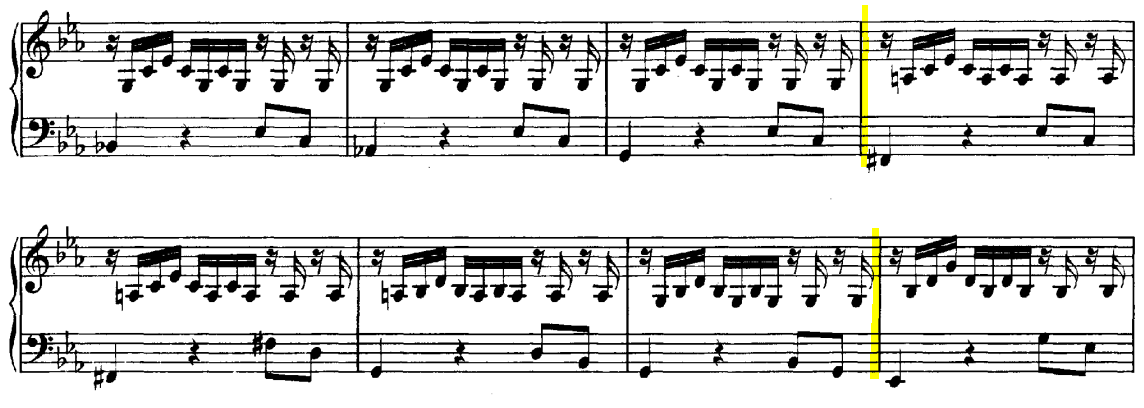
Measures 8–14 (modulation occurring in mm. 11–14 is highlighted]).

Contrary to its title and key signature, less than a third of BWV 999 is actually written in C minor. In measure 11, a Secondary leading-tone chord is employed (namely, a diminished F♯ seventh chord) to modulate and lead the ear to G minor, the dominant of the original key. Aside from a turn to G major but with a flattened 6th (mm. 34–38 and 42–43), and the reemergence of C minor (mm. 39–41), G minor tonality dominates the piece. Early on, the upper voice is repeated over several measures, with the left hand providing the only shifting harmonic background. For example, measures 8–10 are exactly the same in the right hand, but descending tones in the left hand create an expansion of tonic harmony.

== Reception ==
In 1843, Friedrich Konrad Griepenkerl edited the Prelude as No. 3 of the "XII petits Préludes ou Exercises pour les Commençants" (lit. '12 little preludes or exercises for beginners'), which was included in the 9th volume of Bach's complete keyboard works published by C. F. Peters. The next year, the publisher issued the Twelve Little Preludes set separately. Philipp Spitta described BWV 999 thus:

Vorzüglich ist ein kleines C moll-Praeludium, das harfenartig lispelnd von einer Harmonie zur andern träumt und die wundersame Romantik des Bachschen Geistes ahnungsvoll emporsteigen läßt

— Philipp Spitta (1873)
Translation:

Very admirable is a little prelude in C minor, which runs whispering on in harp-like tones from one set of harmonies to another, and yet lets the mystical romanticism of Bach's genius pierce through it all.

— Bell/Fuller Maitland translation

Spitta, assuming that nearly none of Bach's compositions for lute survived, mentioned the third of the Twelve Little Preludes as composed for lute or keyboard. The Bach Gesellschaft retained the Twelve Little Preludes set for keyboard in the 36th volume, published in 1890, of their complete edition of Bach's works.

Hans Neemann, writing in the Bach-Jahrbuch of 1931, had no doubt that Bach composed the Prelude for lute:

Auch diese Komposition liegt der Laute in alter Stimmung sehr günstig und ist ausgezeichnet spielbar. Die vorzüchliche Einrichtung erweist den Komponisten als mit der Lautentechnik sehr bewandert.

— Hans Neemann
Translation:

Also this composition suits the lute tuned in the old fashion very well, and is very playable. The proficient setting shows that the composer was very versed in lute technique.

Neemann identified five more compositions by Bach as intended for lute. In the Bach-Werke-Verzeichnis, first published in 1950, these compositions were grouped in the BWV 995–1000 range, in a section for lute works. The same six compositions were published in Series V, Vol. 10, of the New Bach Edition, in 1976.

The Prelude has been adapted for various instruments, including lute, piano and guitar. It is a pedagogical work much in the spirit of The Well-Tempered Clavier, with which it shares musical characteristics. In the second decade of the 21st century, digital facsimiles of Kellner's manuscript became available on the Berlin State Library and Bach Digital websites.

== Recordings ==
Some guitarists perform the Prelude BWV 999 in D minor instead of in its original key of C minor (but they can however use D standard tuning so that when they play in D minor, it sounds as the original C minor).

Recordings of Prelude BWV 999
Recorded	Instrument	Performed by	Time
1928–1930	guitar	Andrés Segovia	1:23
25–26 September 1936	harpsichord	Wanda Landowska	0:57
1942–1950	piano	Walter Gieseking	0:59
≤1954	guitar	Alexandre Lagoya	1:16
1954	guitar	Andrés Segovia	1:14
1956	lute	Julian Bream	1:42
1965	guitar	Julian Bream	1:34
1965	guitar	Celedonio Romero	1:28
1964–1971	guitar	René Bartoli	1:37
1965–1973	harpsichord	Zuzana Růžičková	1:56
1970	lute	Konrad Ragossnig	1:38
1973	guitar (ten-string)	Narciso Yepes	2:06
1974–1975	guitar	John Williams	1:33
1980	lute	Gergely Sárközy	2:04
1981	lute	Hopkinson Smith	1:50
1981	guitar	Alexander Frauchi	1:19
1983	lute	Franz Just	2:05
1984	guitar	Jürgen Rost	1:56
1984	harpsichord	Kenneth Gilbert	1:47
1984	guitar	Göran Söllscher	1:51
1985	baroque lute	Nigel North	1:47
1986	lute	Jakob Lindberg	1:50
October 1986	harpsichord	Dominique Ferran	1:35
1986–1987	organ	Klaas Jan Mulder	1:23
October 1987	guitar	Eduardo Fernández	1:35
September 1987	theorbo	Lutz Kirchhof	1:59
June 1988	piano	Hui-Ying Liu	1:22
23–25 July 1988	guitar (eight-string)	Andrew Schulman	1:59
1988–1989	lute	Konrad Junghänel	1:39
1989	guitar	Lubomír Brabec	1:28
December 1989	baroque lute	Yasunori Imamura	1:44
≤1990	guitar	Dominique Starck	1:57
1990	guitar	Rudolf Wangler	1:30
1990	harp	Éva Maros	2:00
June 1990	guitar	Christian de Chabot	1:49
19–21 June 1990	piano	Maria Tipo	1:09
21–22 June 1991	piano	János Sebestyén	1:11
1992	lute	Jakob Lindberg	1:58
1992	marimba	Peter Sadlo	1:01
18 February 1994	guitar	Franco Trentin	1:33
≤1995	piano	Walter Vleminckx	1:18
1995	harpsichord	Richard Egarr	1:25
28–30 August 1995	piano	Angela Hewitt	1:26
1996	piano	Georges Pludermacher	1:32
1992–2000	guitar	Ansgar Krause	1:36
April–May 1996	lute	Ronn McFarlane	1:21
1997	harpsichord	Élisabeth Joyé	1:46
1997	harpsichord	Pierre Hantaï	1:42
June–September 1997	guitar	Lubomír Brabec	1:32
1998	lute-harpsichord	Robert Hill	1:40
August–September 1998	piano	Gersende Vandenhove	1:10
≤1999	lute	Luca Pianca	1:34
1999	baroque lute	Paul Beier	1:40
1999	harpsichord	Bob van Asperen	2:03
1999–2000	guitar	Frédéric Zigante	1:53
1999–2000	guitar	Han Jonkers	1:37
July 1999	piano	Ivo Janssen	1:13
November 1999	harpsichord	Pieter-Jan Belder	1:34
December 1999	piano	Nariné Simonian	1:13
2000	lute	Eduardo Egüez	1:27
2000	guitar (ten-string)	Stephan Schmidt	1:54
2000	harpsichord	Luc Beauséjour	1:39
2002	guitar	Sharon Isbin	2:10
2003	guitar	Frank Bungarten	1:24
2003	harp	Joanna Kozielska	2:27
2003	marimba	Filippo Lattanzi	1:29
2004	theorbo	Andreas Martin	1:41
2005	guitar	Filomena Moretti	1:24
≤2007	guitar	Steve Hackett	1:13
August 2007	lute-harpsichord	Elizabeth Farr	1:31
2008	clavichord	Cristiano Holtz	1:31
March 2008	piano	Andrea Bacchetti	1:24
≤15 November 2008	theorbo	Peter Croton	2:04
1999–2017	guitar	Luigi Attademo	1:43
2009–2010	guitar	Georg Gulyás	1:43
2010	harpsichord	Violaine Cochard	1:54
February 2010	baroque lute	Rafael Bonavita	1:23
2010–2012	guitar	Stefano Grondona	1:25
2011	guitar guitar (ten-string)	Hannu Annala; Mari Mäntylä	1:32
January–April 2012	baroque lute	Mario D'Agosto	1:38
2013	lute-harpsichord	Olivier Baumont	1:30
2013	fortepiano	Luca Guglielmi	1:19
2015	harpsichord	Rinaldo Alessandrini	1:24
January 2015	piano	Tristan Pfaff	1:02
13–17 July 2015	baroque lute	Yasunori Imamura	1:55
2017	clavichord	Sigrun Stephan	1:21
2017	marimba	Tobias Messerschmidt	1:33
2020	baroque lute	Jadran Duncumb	1:40
