= Stephan Schmidt =

Stephan Schmidt may refer to:

- Stephan Schmidt (guitarist)
- Stephan Schmidt (footballer)
- Stephan Schmidt (politician)

== See also ==
- Stefan Schmidt (disambiguation)
- Steve Schmidt (disambiguation)
