= Prelude and Fugue in F minor, BWV 857 =

Composition by Johann Sebastian Bach

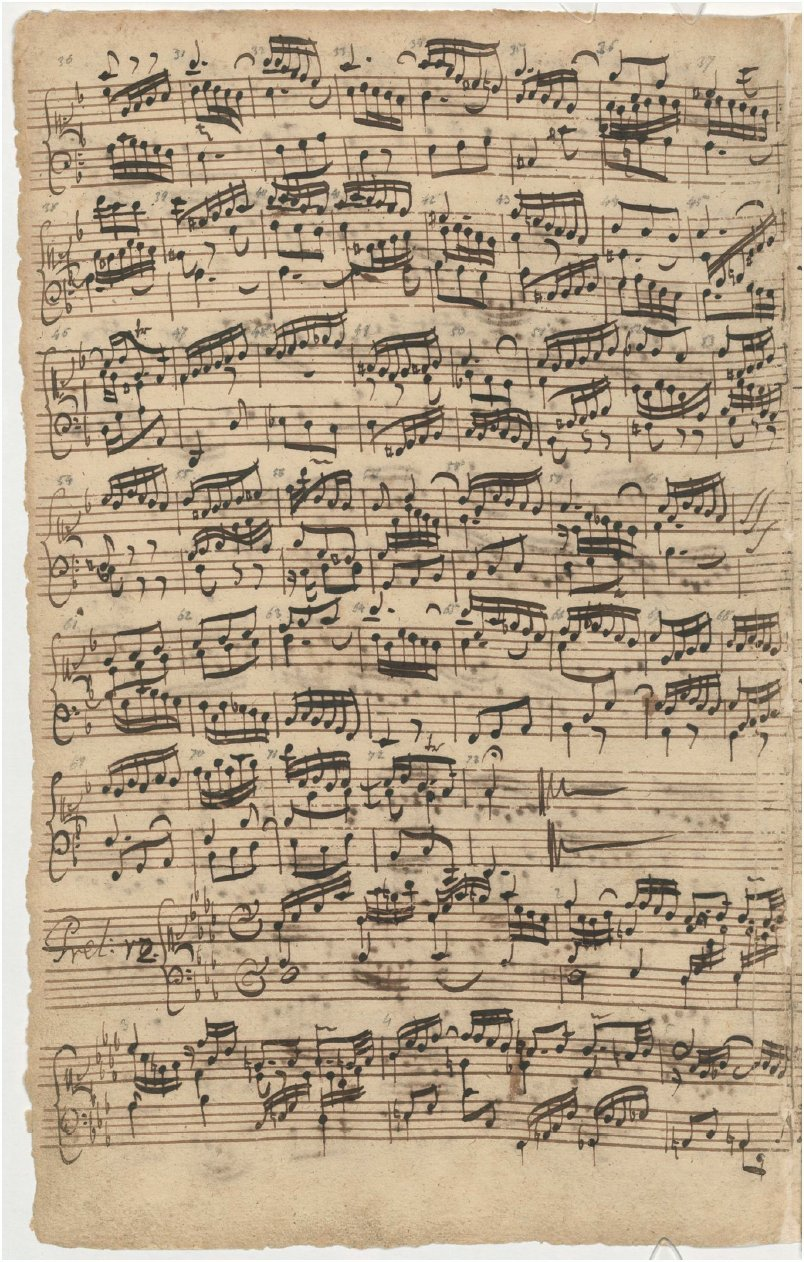
First page of the autograph manuscript

Prelude and Fugue in F minor, BWV 857, is the twelfth piece in the first book of The Well-Tempered Clavier by Johann Sebastian Bach, compiled circa 1722.

The prelude is characterized by a melancholic tone, while the four-voice fugue is notable for its length and complexity, and is considered one of the more intellectually intricate fugues in the collection.

== Prelude ==
The prelude, marked = 66, consists of 22 measures.

The first half of the first volume of The Well-Tempered Clavier concludes with a substantial pair of pieces. The prelude is notable for its somber tonality, which is similar to that of Bach's cantata Weinen, Klagen, Sorgen, Zagen, BWV 12, (Weeping, Lamenting, Worrying, Fearing).

The prelude is characterized by a subdued and melancholic mood, employing a free polyphonic texture in a broken style, often featuring implied voices and minimal use of rests. Some scholars have suggested it may have been intended for organ, given the frequent use of ties and the presence of a pedal point in the coda. Although not written in strict four-part harmony, the sustained quarter notes imply the presence of an additional voice. The main theme returns in the tonic key over a dominant pedal shortly before the coda.

== Fugue ==
The four-voice fugue, marked = 84, is 58 measures long, unusually lengthy, and one of the most deeply conceived in the collection.

The subject resembles a figured chorale theme, consisting of ten chromatic quarter notes spanning an octave over three measures, progressing from the dominant to the tonic. With the entry of the answer, which introduces F♯ and E♭, all twelve notes of the chromatic scale are presented. This use of the complete chromatic scale is highly unusual and comparable only to the subject of the 24th fugue in the collection.

The ornamentation of the penultimate note is a matter of interpretive conjecture, as no authentic ornament sign or trill is indicated, unlike in the B minor fugue. In some instances, such ornamentation would be impractical to perform. However, a brief trill may be used to highlight the subject's presence in a middle voice, such as in measure 36.

Two countersubjects follow shortly after the subject and are systematically combined with it in regular inversion. The first countersubject, introduced in measure 4, contrasts with the subject through its division into four fragments and its octave range. This figure, often referred to as "sighs", recurs throughout the piece. The downward octave leap appears only in the exposition and is not sustained in subsequent entries.

The second countersubject, introduced at the end of measure 7, complements the first and contributes to a texture characterized by dissonance and severity. Although the fugue is constructed using invertible counterpoint, not all combinations of the subject and countersubjects are employed. The episodes, or "bridges," are also treated with flexibility; the first two (measures 10–13 and 16–19) serve as the basis for the remaining episodes (five in total), except for the passage from measures 37 to 40, which is derived from the material of the first countersubject.

The exposition presents the subject in succession in the tenor, alto, and bass, incorporating both countersubjects from that point onward, except for measure 40. After three measures of harmonic progression, the soprano enters with the subject in measure 13, rather than the expected answer. Subsequent entries occur in paired voices: tenor in three voices (measure 19), bass (measure 27); alto in A♭ major (measure 34), tenor without countersubjects (measure 40); soprano in E♭ major, in three voices (measure 47), and bass (measure 53). Voice leading is often obscured by extensive voice crossings across the staves.

The bass voice is absent for extended passages, notably in measures 19–27 and 47–53, before reentering with the subject. In the latter part of the second development (measures 27–46), the tenor introduces the subject alone in measure 40, without the accompanying countersubjects.

The fugue does not follow a clearly defined structure separating exposition and episodes. Instead, it comprises successive subject entries connected by brief linking passages, which are not developed into distinct sections.

The divertimento sections, inserted between successive entries of the subject (measures 22–25, 31–33, and 50–52), offer contrast through their predominantly diatonic character. These passages provide a tonal counterbalance to the chromatic and harmonically tense subject, establishing a contrast between two thematic principles. The overall structure of the fugue evokes elements of the rondo form. To accommodate the range in which the subject is presented, these sections are written in three voices, except for the divertimento in measures 43–47, where the soprano remains in its lower register, creating the impression of an additional voice upon the subject's return.

The dactylic rhythmic motif is derived from the first bridge connecting the subject and the first countersubject. Commonly used in Bach's cantatas, this rhythmic figure was referred to by Albert Schweitzer as the "motif of joy". In this context, however, it conveys a sense of serenity and inner calm.

== Relationship ==
The prelude alludes to the fugue subject through elongated notes in the coda (measures 16–20), anticipating the thematic material of the fugue.

== Genesis ==
The earliest known version of the prelude, preserved in a copy by Johann Nikolaus Forkel, ends at measure 15 of the final version and includes four additional concluding measures.

A near-final version of the prelude appears in Wilhelm Friedemann Bach's Clavierbüchlein, where it is listed as the eleventh prelude (no. 24).

== Legacy ==
Emanuel Aloys Förster (1748–1823) arranged the fugue for string quartet, performed notably by the Emerson Quartet.

Théodore Dubois created a version for piano four hands, published in 1914.

Reinhard Huuck arranged it for saxophone quartet, recorded for the first time by the Ferio ensemble for the Chandos label (2018, CHAN 10999), along with Prelude and Fugue in G minor, BWV 885.
