= Trio Sonata for Two Flutes (W. F. Bach) =

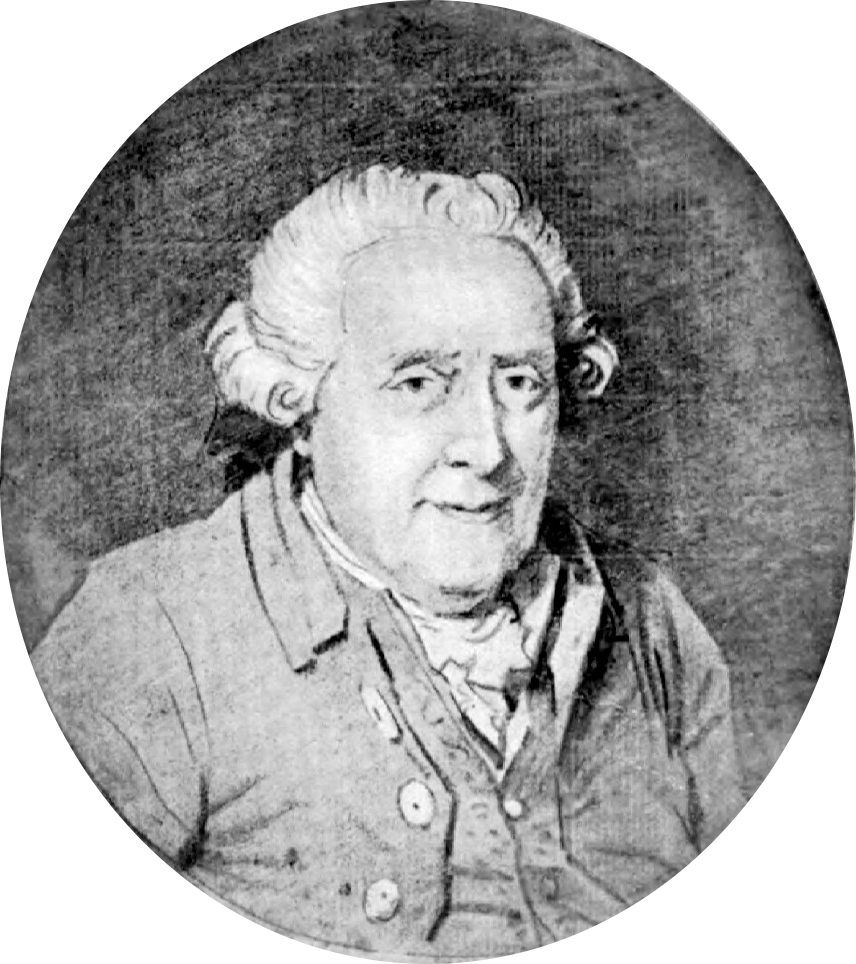
Sketch of Wilhelm Friedemann Bach

The Trio Sonata for Two Flutes in A minor, F. 49, BR B15, is one of three trio sonatas for paired flutes and basso continuo composed c. 1740 by Wilhelm Friedemann Bach while organist at the Dresden Sophienkirche. The manuscript is in the Central State Archives Museum of Literature and Arts of Ukraine in Kyiv.

There are two movements:

1. Allegro
2. Larghetto (fragment)

An attempt to complete the second movement and add a third was published in the 1990s.

It has been recorded by Jean-Pierre Rampal, with Isaac Stern on violin, taking the second flute part.
