= Inventions and Sinfonias =

30 keyboard compositions by J. S. Bach

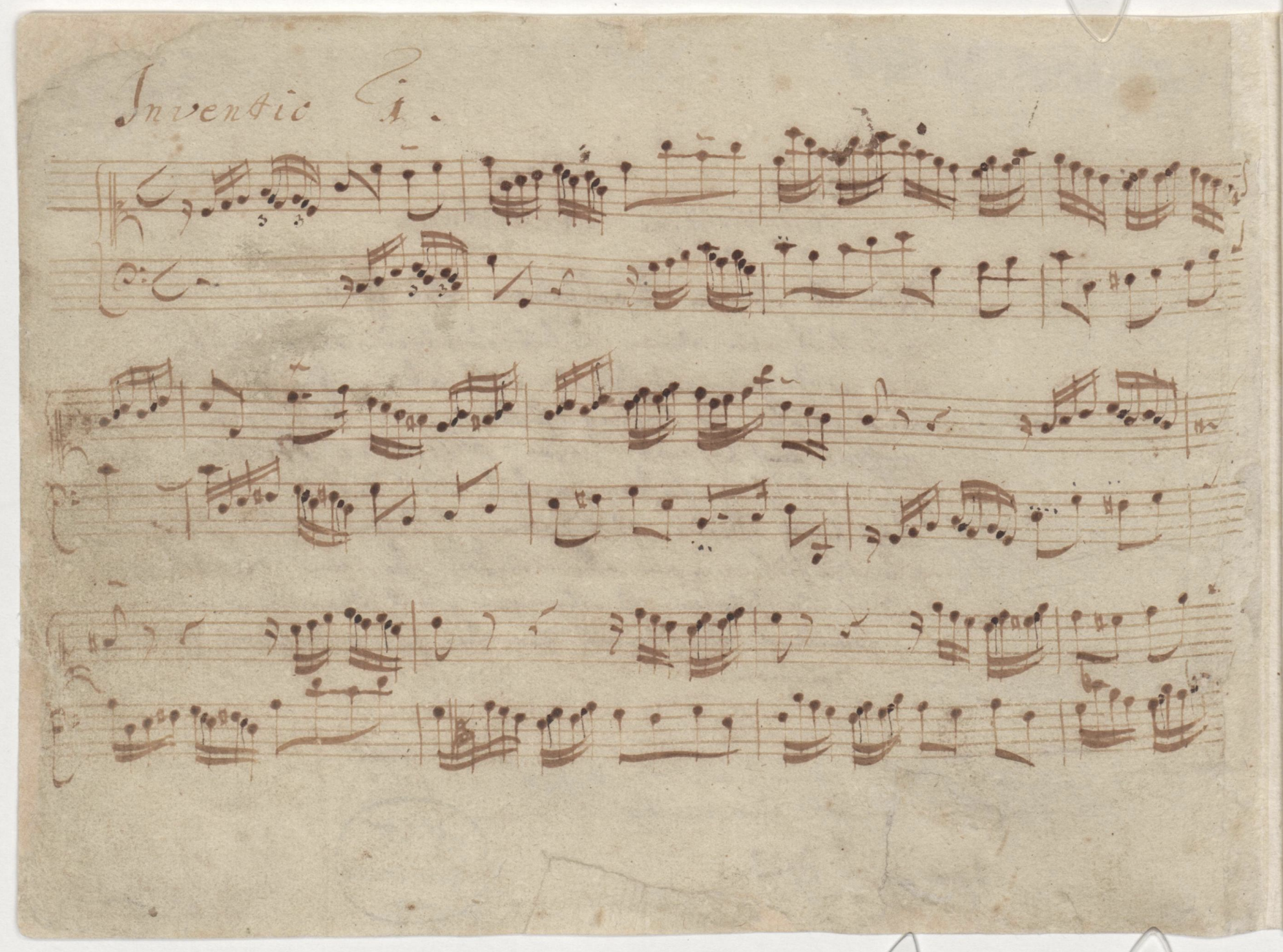
First page of Invention No. 1 (BWV 772), from J.S. Bach's 1723 autograph

The Inventions and Sinfonias, BWV 772–801, also known as the Two- and Three-Part Inventions, are a collection of thirty short keyboard compositions by Johann Sebastian Bach (1685–1750): 15 inventions, which are two-part contrapuntal pieces, and 15 sinfonias, which are three-part contrapuntal pieces. They were originally written as Praeambula and Fantasiae in the Klavierbüchlein für Wilhelm Friedemann Bach, a clavier-booklet for his eldest son, and later rewritten as musical exercises for his students.

Bach titled the collection:

Forthright instruction, wherewith lovers of the clavier, especially those desirous of learning, are shown in a clear way not only 1) to learn to play two voices clearly, but also after further progress 2) to deal correctly and well with three obbligato parts, moreover at the same time to obtain not only good ideas, but also to carry them out well, but most of all to achieve a cantabile style of playing, and thereby to acquire a strong foretaste of composition.

The two groups of pieces are both arranged in order of ascending key, each group covering eight major and seven minor keys. Bach also composed an alternative version of the first Invention featuring triplets, identified as BWV 772a.

The inventions were composed in Köthen; the sinfonias, on the other hand, were probably not finished until the beginning of the Leipzig period. The autograph fair copy is dated 1723.

== Media ==
Key	Invention
C major	No. 1, BWV 772
C minor	No. 2, BWV 773
D major	No. 3, BWV 774
D minor	No. 4, BWV 775
E♭ major	No. 5, BWV 776
E major	No. 6, BWV 777
E minor	No. 7, BWV 778
F major	No. 8, BWV 779
F minor	No. 9, BWV 780
G major	No. 10, BWV 781
G minor	No. 11, BWV 782
A major	No. 12, BWV 783
A minor	No. 13, BWV 784
B♭ major	No. 14, BWV 785
B minor	No. 15, BWV 786
	These (Inventions) are MIDI representations of Bach's music, and do not convey how a human musician would perform them.

Key	Sinfonia
C major	No. 1, BWV 787
C minor	No. 2, BWV 788
D major	No. 3, BWV 789
D minor	No. 4, BWV 790
E♭ major	No. 5, BWV 791
E major	No. 6, BWV 792
E minor	No. 7, BWV 793
F major	No. 8, BWV 794
F minor	No. 9, BWV 795
G major	No. 10, BWV 796
G minor	No. 11, BWV 797
A major	No. 12, BWV 798
A minor	No. 13, BWV 799
B♭ major	No. 14, BWV 800
B minor	No. 15, BWV 801
	All Sinfonia performances above were played by Randolph Hokanson. Sinfonia No. 8 A version of Sinfonia No. 8 (BWV 794) for clarinet, oboe and cello Sinfonia No. 15 and another version of Sinfonia No. 15 (BWV 801).
