= Stephan Schmidt (politician) =

German politician (born 1973)

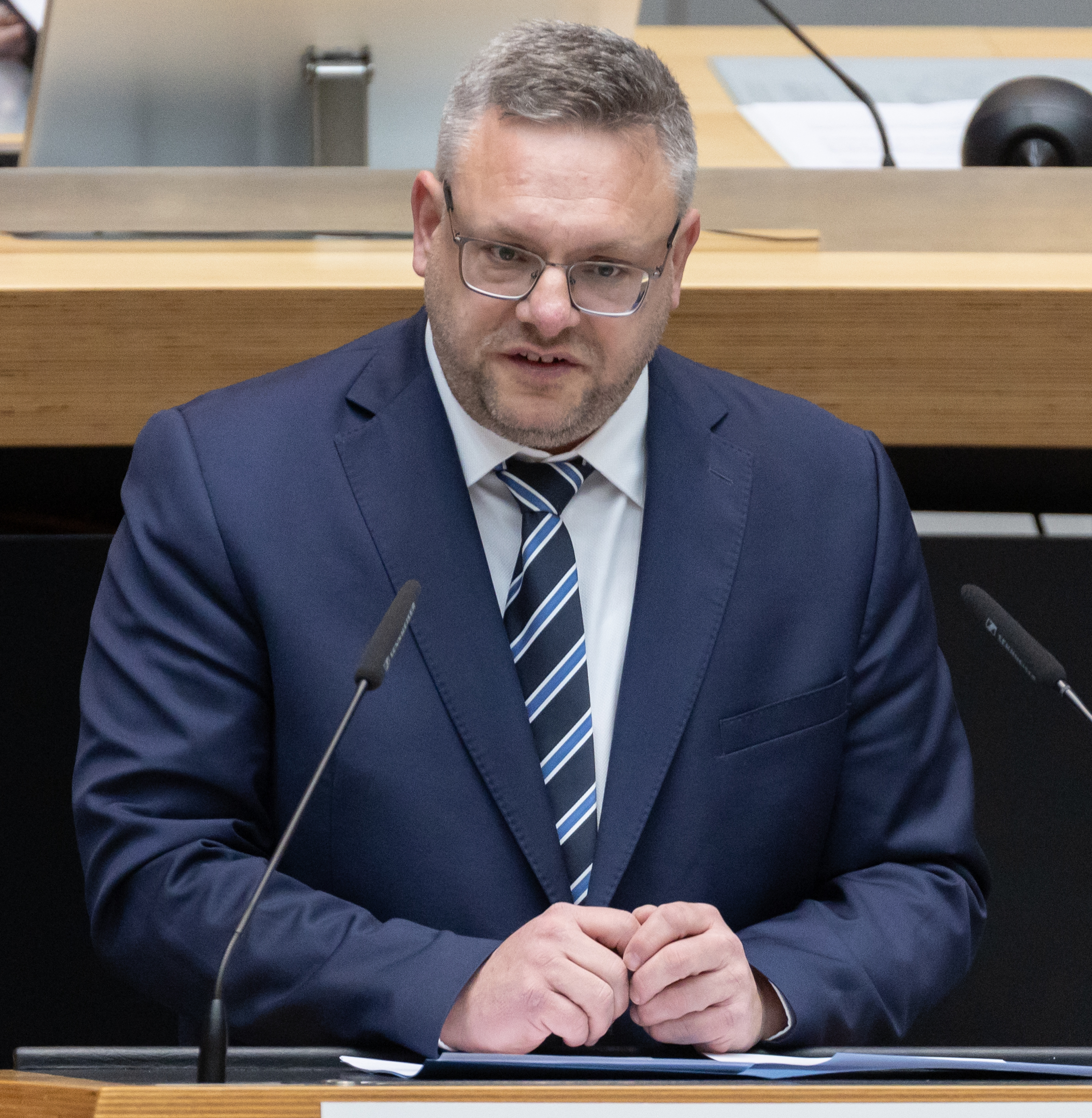
- Schmidt in 2025

Member of the Abgeordnetenhaus of Berlin
- Incumbent
- Assumed office 27 October 2016
- Preceded by: Manuel Heide
- Constituency: Reinickendorf 3

Personal details
- Born: 15 November 1973 (age 52) Berlin
- Party: Christian Democratic Union (since 1991)

Stephan Schmidt (born 15 November 1973 in Berlin) is a German politician serving as a member of the Abgeordnetenhaus of Berlin since 2016. He has served as chief whip of the Christian Democratic Union since 2023.
