= Klavierbüchlein für Wilhelm Friedemann Bach =

Collection of keyboard music

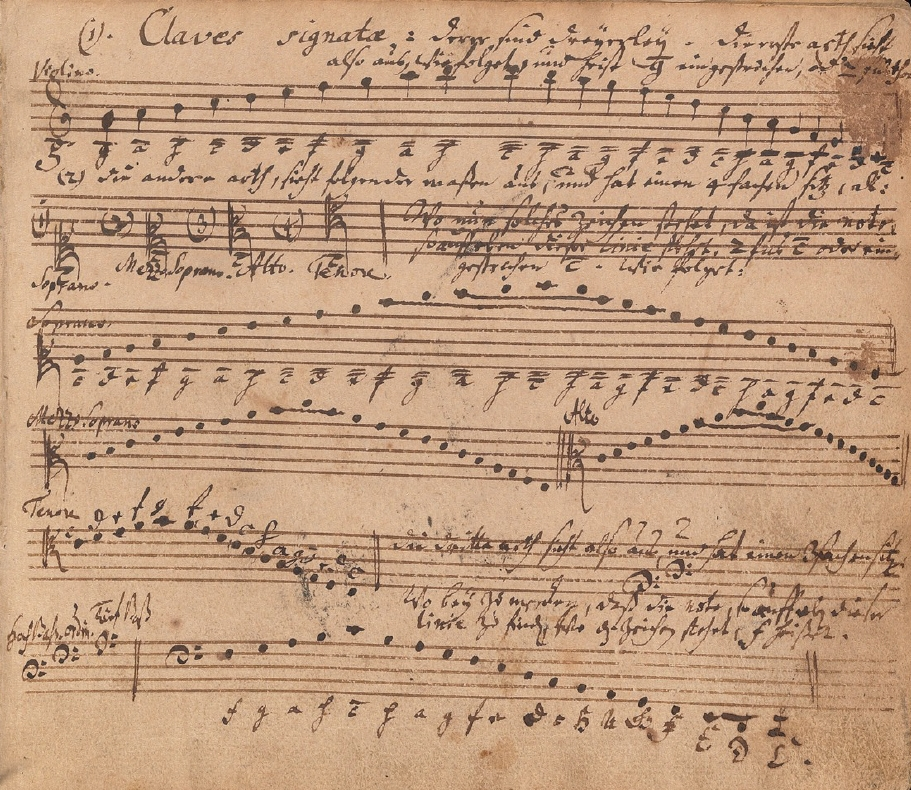
Explanation of clefs which begins the Klavierbüchlein, in Johann Sebastian's hand

Klavierbüchlein für Wilhelm Friedemann Bach (Bach's original spelling: Clavier-Büchlein vor Wilhelm Friedemann Bach) is a collection of keyboard music compiled by the German Baroque composer Johann Sebastian Bach for his eldest son Wilhelm Friedemann. It is frequently referred to simply as Klavierbüchlein.

Johann Sebastian began compiling the collection in 1720. Most of the pieces included are better known as parts of The Well-Tempered Clavier and the Inventions and Sinfonias. The authorship of most other works is debated: particularly the famous Little Preludes BWV 924–932 are sometimes attributed to Wilhelm Friedemann Bach.

== Contents ==
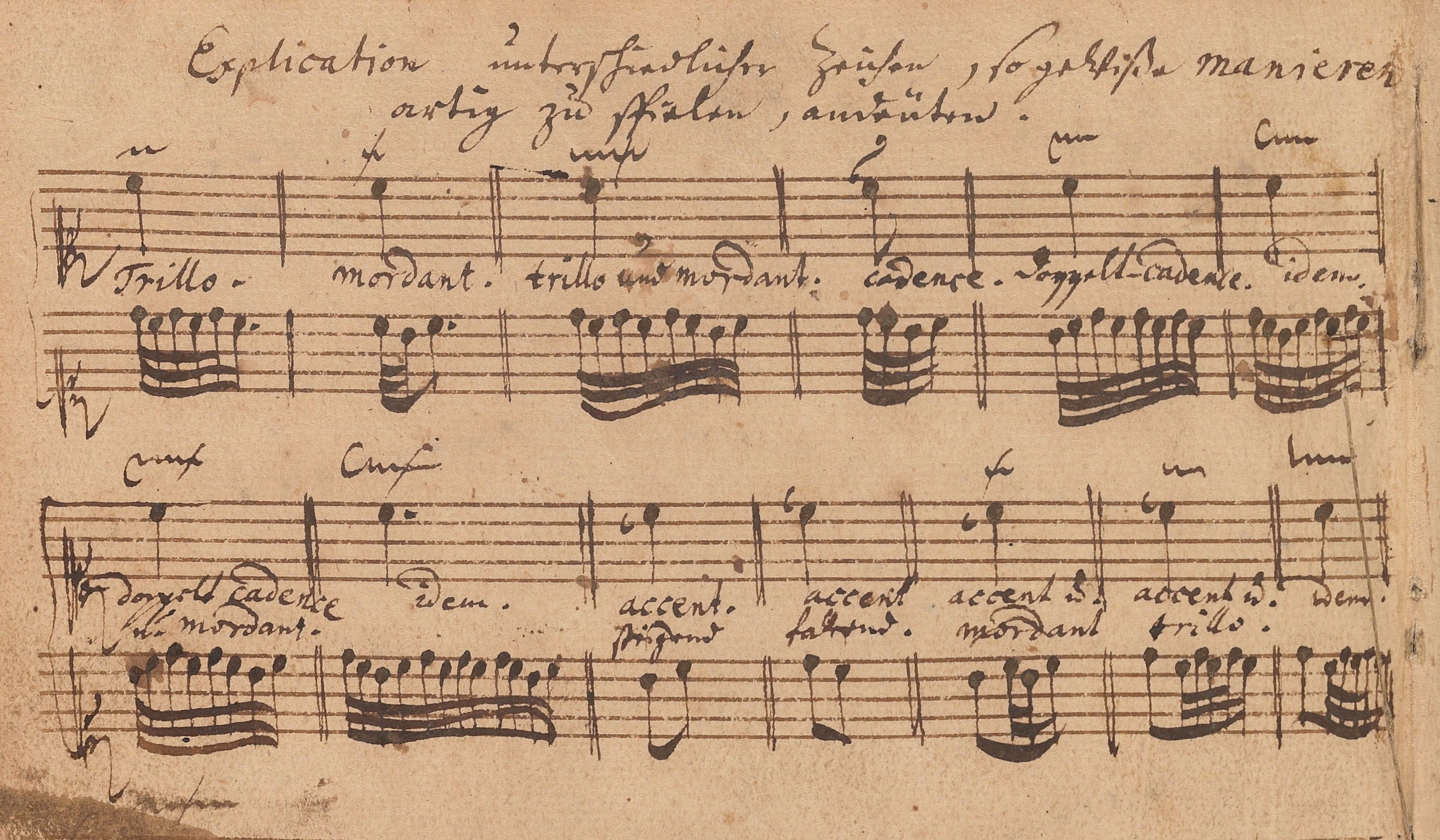
A guide to ornaments, written in Bach's hand and included in the Klavierbüchlein

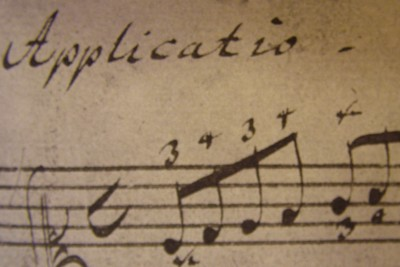
Close-up of the first bar of Applicatio in C major, BWV 994. Bach's fingering marks are clearly visible

Prelude in D minor for harpsichord, BWV 926
No. 4, Prelude in D minor, played on harpsichord

BWV 853/1 Prelude in E♭ minor
Klavierbüchlein für Wilhelm Friedemann Bach No. 23, Praeludium [No. 10] is an incomplete copy (35 bars), partly in the handwriting of W. F. Bach and partly in the handwriting of J. S. Bach, of the Prelude of The Well-Tempered Clavier book I, No. 8 (BWV 853)

The book begins with a preface that contains an explanation of clefs and a guide to playing ornaments. The pieces of the collection are arranged by complexity, beginning with the most simple works. Of these, Applicatio in C major BWV 994 and Prelude in G minor BWV 930 are particularly notable because they are the only surviving works that feature the fingering in Bach's own hand. The only other Bach piece with fingering marks is the C major Prelude BWV 870a, however, the marks are not in Bach's hand. They were probably added by Johann Caspar Vogler, Bach's pupil and successor at Weimar.

Here is a complete list of pieces, in order of appearance in the manuscript, with the numbering as in most score editions:

1. BWV 994, Applicatio in C major
2. BWV 924, Prelude in C major
3. BWV 691, Wer nur den lieben Gott lässt walten (4), chorale prelude for organ
4. BWV 926, Prelude in D minor
5. BWV 753, Jesu, meine Freude (2), chorale prelude for organ (incomplete)
6. BWV 836, Allemande in G minor (1). Possibly composed by Wilhelm Friedemann Bach
7. BWV 837, Allemande in G minor (2), incomplete. Possibly composed by Wilhelm Friedemann Bach
8. BWV 927, Prelude in F major
9. BWV 930, Prelude in G minor
10. BWV 928, Prelude in F major
11. BWV 841, Minuet in G major. Probably not by Johann Sebastian Bach. This piece was also included in the 1722 Notebook for Anna Magdalena Bach
12. BWV 842, Minuet in G minor
13. BWV 843, Minuet in G major
14. BWV 846a, Praeludium 1 in C major. Alternative version of the prelude from Prelude and Fugue in C major from the first book of The Well-Tempered Clavier.
15. BWV 847/1, Praeludium 2 in C minor (Prelude in C minor from the first book of The Well-Tempered Clavier)
16. BWV 851/1, Praeludium 3 in D minor (Prelude in D minor from the first book of The Well-Tempered Clavier)
17. BWV 850/1, Praeludium 4 in D major (Prelude in D major from the first book of The Well-Tempered Clavier, incomplete)
18. BWV 855a, Praeludium 5 in E minor. Alternative version of the prelude from Prelude and Fugue in E minor from the first book of The Well-Tempered Clavier. This was later arranged for pianoforte by Alexander Siloti and transposed into a Prelude in B minor.
19. BWV 854/1, Praeludium 6 in E major (Prelude in E major from the first book of The Well-Tempered Clavier)
20. BWV 856/1, Praeludium 7 in F major (Prelude in F major from the first book of The Well-Tempered Clavier)
21. BWV 848/1, Praeludium [8] in C♯ major (Prelude in C♯ major from the first book of The Well-Tempered Clavier)
22. BWV 849/1, Praeludium [9] in C♯ minor (Prelude in C♯ minor from the first book of The Well-Tempered Clavier)
23. BWV 853/1, Praeludium [10] in E♭ minor (Prelude in E♭ minor from the first book of The Well-Tempered Clavier)
24. BWV 857/1, Praeludium [11] in F minor (Prelude in F minor from the first book of The Well-Tempered Clavier)
25. Piéce pour le Clavecin, harpsichord suite by J. C. Richter. Two movements: I. Allemande; II. Courante.
26. BWV 924a, Prelude in C major (alternative version of BWV 924)
27. BWV 925, Prelude in D major
28. BWV 932, Prelude in E minor
29. BWV 931, Prelude in A minor
30. Baß-Skizze in G minor. Not included in the BWV catalogue.
31. BWV 953, Fuga a 3 in C major.
32. BWV 772, Praeambulum 1 in C major (Invention No. 1)
33. BWV 775, Praeambulum 2 in D minor (Invention No. 4)
34. BWV 778, Praeambulum 3 in E minor (Invention No. 7)
35. BWV 779, Praeambulum 4 in F major (Invention No. 8)
36. BWV 781, Praeambulum 5 in G major (Invention No. 10)
37. BWV 784, Praeambulum 6 in A minor (Invention No. 13)
38. BWV 786, Praeambulum 7 in B minor (Invention No. 15)
39. BWV 785, Praeambulum 8 in B♭ major (Invention No. 14)
40. BWV 783, Praeambulum 9 in A major (Invention No. 12)
41. BWV 782, Praeambulum 10 in G minor (Invention No. 11)
42. BWV 780, Praeambulum 11 in F minor (Invention No. 9)
43. BWV 777, Praeambulum 12 in E major (Invention No. 6)
44. BWV 776, Praeambulum 13 in E♭ major (Invention No. 5)
45. BWV 774, Praeambulum 14 in D major (Invention No. 3)
46. BWV 773, Praeambulum 15 in C minor (Invention No. 2)
47. BWV 824, Suite in A major by Georg Philipp Telemann. Three parts: Allemande, Courante and Gigue, TWV 32:14
48. Partita di Signore Steltzeln, harpsichord suite by Gottfried Heinrich Stölzel. Four movements: I. Ouverture; II. Air Italien; III. Bourrée; IV. Minuet; With an additional movement composed by Bach: V. Menuet – Trio, BWV 929
49. BWV 787, Fantasia 1 in C major (Sinfonia No. 1)
50. BWV 790, Fantasia 2 in D minor (Sinfonia No. 4)
51. BWV 793, Fantasia 3 in E minor (Sinfonia No. 7)
52. BWV 794, Fantasia 4 in F major (Sinfonia No. 8)
53. BWV 796, Fantasia 5 in G major (Sinfonia No. 10)
54. BWV 799, Fantasia 6 in A minor (Sinfonia No. 13)
55. BWV 801, Fantasia 7 in B minor (Sinfonia No. 15)
56. BWV 800, Fantasia 8 in B♭ major (Sinfonia No. 14)
57. BWV 798, Fantasia 9 in A major (Sinfonia No. 12)
58. BWV 797, Fantasia 10 in G minor (Sinfonia No. 11)
59. BWV 795, Fantasia 11 in F minor (Sinfonia No. 9)
60. BWV 792, Fantasia 12 in E major (Sinfonia No. 6)
61. BWV 791, Fantasia 13 in E♭ major (Sinfonia No. 5)
62. BWV 789, Fantasia 14 in D major (Sinfonia No. 3), incomplete.

== See also ==
- Notebook for Anna Magdalena Bach, a notebook J.S. Bach compiled for his second wife
- De Gruytters carillon book, a music manuscript from Antwerp at the same time period
- List of compositions by Johann Sebastian Bach

== Sources ==
- Johann Sebastian Bach, Wilhelm Friedemann Bach, Johann Christoph Richter, Gottfried Heinrich Stölzel, Georg Philipp Telemann and various anonymous contributors. Clavier-Büchlein vor Wilhelm Friedemann Bach, angefangen in Cöthen den 22. Januar Ao. 1720., facsimile at brbl-dl.library.yale.edu
- Bach, Johann Sebastian (1981) [1962]. Wolfgang Plath (ed.). Klavierbüchlein für Wilhelm Friedemann. Neue Bach-Ausgabe. Vol. 5 (third ed.). Bärenreiter. ISMN 9790006461837.
- Faulkner, Quentin (1984). J. S. Bach's Keyboard Technique: A Historical Introduction. St. Louis: Concordia Publishing House.
- US-NHub Music Deposit 31 (Klavierbüchlein für W. F. Bach), Bach Digital
