= Dominique Starck =

Dominique Starck (born 1956) is a Swiss guitarist, composer and music teacher.

== Biography ==
Dominique Starck was born in 1956 to a family of musicians originally from Strassburg, in which their musical heritage was passed on from generation to generation. In his youth he played in various rock bands. He studied guitar at Zurich Conservatory of Music with Gertrud Brun and Walter Feybli and gained a concert diploma with distinction in 1978. He studied composition with Josef Haselbach and went on to study Oriental, Far-Eastern and African music. His music was also influenced by his studies of Alexander technique and gigong with L. Jeng-Chun Chen (Taiwan) and African music with Cheikh Tidiane Niane (Senegal).

Early in his career, Dominique Starck was a member of the Johannes Kobelt Quartett and various other formations (jazz and classical) which saw him giving concerts throughout Europe and the US. His music has been recorded in numerous CD, Radio and TV recordings.

Dominique Starck further developed his knowledge of the therapeutic aspects of music through his research work with psychiatrist Balthasar Staehelin (University of Zurich), John Buttrick (Music therapist USA) as well as contact with Massai natives in Africa and Native Indians in the USA.

2010 marked the release of Dominique Starck's Anniversary CD "Remastered Guitar Works 1990–2010. In 2010 Dominique Starck played in Dechen Shak Dagsay's new album "Jewel" (Universal Music) 2015 saw the release of a new CD "The Two Cosmic Octaves" with Harda Müller on monochord.

In 2016 Dominique Starck founded a Duo together with percussionist Marco Käppeli, as well as forming the ensemble Mono Soma (Sound-Meditation) with Silvan Winkler (monochord, koto, pads) und Eva Luna Benedetti (voice). The ensemble gives regular concerts in Switzerland and its music is used by numerous practitioners for meditation and yoga.

Over the past 20 years, Dominique Starck has developed his own chanting method, named Chakra-Chant-Move (breathing, sound, visualisation and movement), a holistic integral way of self-development.

In 2019 Starck's book "Chanting: Connecting heaven and earth" was published by Chalice publishers.

Four new albums titled "Yellow Spere", "Green Sphere", "Red Sphere" and "Blue Sphere", together with pianist and keyboarder Marcus Reichard, were released at the end of 2020. The series features harmonic, atmospheric meditation music in which each album corresponds to a different acoustic colour, recorded by sound designer Steven Parry and singer Marion Weik.

2021 saw the release of the album "Zenter", also with Marcus Reichard and in 2022 of "Barocksonaten remastered", with the cellist Claude Starck.

== Works ==
=== Recordings ===
- Barocksonaten. (with Claude Starck, Cello), DNDS 1031
- Diamond. (with Daniel Neukom, Flute), DNDS 1223-2
- Chalice. Works by Frescobaldi, Bach, Albeniz, Starck and others, DNDS 1224
- Inner Movements. Claves 50-9216
- Journey Within. DNDS 1028-2
- Remastered Guitar Works 1990–2010. DNDS Records
- Die Sphäre der Poesie. (with Louis Jeng-Chun Chen, Flute), DNDS 1061
- Tune In. DNDS Records 21023
- Winds. DNDS 3112-2
- The Two Cosmic Octaves. (with Harda Müller, Monochord).
- Zenter (with Marcus Reichard, Piano and Keyboard), DNDS Records
- Barocksonaten remastered (with Claude Starck, Cello)

=== Books ===
- Starck, Dominique (1997). Alchemie der Oktave oder der heilende Klang (in German). Freiamt. ISBN 978-3-924195-30-4. OCLC 76217506.
- Starck, Dominique (2011). Heilendes Chanting Buch (in German). Aarau. ISBN 978-3-03800-534-6. OCLC 703888323.
- Starck, Dominique; Chalice Verlag (2019). Chanting Himmel und Erde verbinden : Archaisches Vokaltönen und seine Wirkung (in German). [Xanten]. ISBN 978-3-942914-36-9. OCLC 1185925678.
