= Prelude and Fugue in E minor, BWV 855 =

Keyboard composition by Johann Sebastian Bach

The Prelude and Fugue in E minor, BWV 855, is the 10th prelude and fugue for keyboard (harpsichord) in the first book of The Well Tempered Clavier, composed in 1722 by Johann Sebastian Bach. The Prelude in E minor, BWV 855a, features as No. 18 ("Praeludium 5") in the 1720 Klavierbüchlein für Wilhelm Friedemann Bach. BWV 855a may also refer to both this Prelude and a Fughetta in the same key, an early version of BWV 855. Alexander Siloti made a piano arrangement in B minor of the Prelude BWV 855a.

== Prelude and Fughetta, BWV 855a ==
Where the 1998 version of the Bach-Werke-Verzeichnis (BWV^{2a}) described BWV 855a as only a Prelude, based on its appearance in the Klavierbüchlein für Wilhelm Friedemann Bach, BWV 855a may also refer to both this Prelude and a Fughetta in E minor, found in a manuscript copy made between 1750 and the early 19th century, once owned by F. Konwitschny but later lost. The Prelude and Fughetta were published in Series V, Volume 6.1 of the Neue Bach-Ausgabe, based on various sources for the Prelude, and on the Konwitschny source (of which a film copy had been preserved) for the Fughetta. BWV 855a is an early version of BWV 855, No. 10 in the 1722 first book of the Well-Tempered Clavier.

== Prelude and Fugue, BWV 855, No. 10 of The Well Tempered Clavier, Book I ==
Prelude and Fugue in E minor, BWV 855, No. 10 in Book 1 of The Well-Tempered Clavier; piano performance by Kimiko Ishizaka
Prelude

Fugue

This piece was written for harpsichord by Bach in 1722 or earlier.

=== Prelude ===
There are 41 measures. The bass line is made up of running sixteenth notes throughout. The treble line is made up of running sixteenth notes throughout with mixed notes in between.

BWV 855: opening bars of Prelude

=== Fugue ===
The fugue is in 2 voices and there are 42 measures.

BWV 855: opening bars of Fugue

== Siloti's arrangement of BWV 855a: Prelude in B minor ==
Prelude in B minor (4:26)
Siloti's transcription, performed by Felipe Sarro

Alexander Siloti made an arrangement the Prelude BWV 855a for piano, transposing it to B minor:

This arrangement has been described as "perhaps Siloti's most tender and perfect" transcription. It transposes Bach's original up from the original E minor into B minor, with the steady sixteenth note figuration that was originally given by Bach to the left hand being instead assigned to the right hand. Siloti also adds a repeat of the entire work, in order to allow for a change of voicing where the melody in the left hand is emphasized. In the published score, above, the chords in the left hand are arpeggiated; however, according to Siloti's daughter Kyriena (to whom the work was dedicated), he would omit the arpeggiation on the first pass and restore it on the repeat in order to heighten the effect of the left-hand melody. It has been performed by many pianists, most famously Emil Gilels.

The date of the arrangement is uncertain: it was first published by A. Gutheil of Moscow, and was performed by Siloti in public for the "first time" (according to an announcement in the Manchester Guardian) in February 1912.
