= Stefan Schmidt =

Stefan Schmidt may refer to:

- Stefan Schmidt (footballer, born 1975), Danish footballer
- Stefan Schmidt (footballer, born 1989), German footballer
- Stefan Schmidt (politician) (born 1981), German politician
- Stefan Due Schmidt (born 1994), Danish speed skater

== See also ==
- Stefan Schmid (born 1970), German decathlete
