= Reinickendorf 3 =

State electoral district of Germany

- Electoral district for the Berlin House of Representatives
- Reinickendorf 3 in 2026
- District: Reinickendorf
- Electorate: 30,061 (2026)

Current electoral district
- Party: CDU
- Member: Niklas Graßelt

Reinickendorf 3 is an electoral constituency (German: Wahlkreis) represented in the House of Representatives of Berlin. It elects one member via first-past-the-post voting.

== Geography ==
The constituency comprises Heiligensee, Konradshöhe, Tegelort, Saatwinkel, part of Tegel-Süd, and part of Tegel. It is entirely within the borough of Reinickendorf.

There were 30,061 eligible voters in 2026.

== Members ==
Election	Member	Party	%
1999	Manuel Heide	CDU	60.1
2001	Manuel Heide	CDU	42.3
2006	Manuel Heide	CDU	43.6
2011	Manuel Heide	CDU	40.0
2016	Stephan Schmidt	CDU	33.5
2021	Stephan Schmidt	CDU	33.4
2023	Stephan Schmidt	CDU	44.1
2026	Niklas Graßelt	CDU	34.3

== Election results ==
=== 2026 election ===
State election (2026): Reinickendorf 3
Notes:	Blue background denotes the winner of the electorate vote. Pink background denotes a candidate elected from their party list. Yellow background denotes an electorate win by a list member, or other incumbent. A ✓ or ✗ denotes status of any incumbent, win or lose respectively.						
Party	Candidate	Votes	%	±%	Party votes	%	±%
CDU	Niklas Graßelt	8,047	34.3	▼9.8	7,626	32.2	▼9.5
SPD	Samuel Märkt	4,018	17.1	▼5.2	3,543	15.0	▼5.7
AfD	Ralf-Günther Conradi	3,836	16.3	▲8.1	3,915	16.5	▲8.2
Greens	Marei Zylka	2,873	12.2	▼0.2	3,009	12.7	▼0.2
Left	Robert Irmscher	2,343	10.0	▲7.1	2,660	11.2	▲7.8
Volt	Sascha Hellwig	916	3.9		623	2.6	▲2.2
FDP	Dieter Schramm	772	3.3	▼1.4	828	3.5	▼2.4
BSW	Bernd Staege	684	2.9		718	3.0	
APT					510	2.2	▼0.3
PARTEI					112	0.5	▼0.4
PdF					56	0.2	
ÖDP					38	0.2	
DKP					18	0.1	
du.					17	0.1	Steady
SGP					5	0.0	
Informal votes		456			267		
Total valid votes		23,489			23,678		
Turnout		23,945	79.7	▲8.1			
CDU hold	Majority	4,029	17.2	▼4.6			

=== 2023 repeat election ===
Changes denoted below for the 2023 election are compared to the 2016 election, as the 2021 election was declared invalid.

State election (2023): Reinickendorf 3
Notes:	Blue background denotes the winner of the electorate vote. Pink background denotes a candidate elected from their party list. Yellow background denotes an electorate win by a list member, or other incumbent. A ✓ or ✗ denotes status of any incumbent, win or lose respectively.						
Party	Candidate	Votes	%	±%	Party votes	%	±%
CDU	✓ Stephan Schmidt	9,348	44.1	▲10.5	8,848	41.7	▲12.3
SPD	Nicola Böcker-Giannini	4,736	22.3	▼1.2	4,391	20.7	▼0.8
Greens	Hinrich Westerkamp	2,637	12.4	Steady	2,731	12.9	▲0.8
AfD	Ralf-Günther Conradi	1,737	8.2	▼6.3	1,771	8.3	▼6.3
FDP	Sibylle Meister	998	4.7	▼4.2	1,256	5.9	▼4.5
APT	Sebastian Sommer	617	2.9		515	2.4	▲1.0
Left	Felix Lederle	616	2.9	▼2.3	729	3.4	▼2.1
PARTEI	Michelle Ehrenfeld	231	1.1		176	0.8	▼0.1
dieBasis	Fabian Schemeit	154	0.7		125	0.6	
The Grays					117	0.6	
Volt					93	0.4	
Gray Panthers					90	0.4	▼1.4
FW	Alexander Kulpok	136	0.6		64	0.3	
Pirates					52	0.2	▼0.6
Team Todenhöfer					48	0.2	
Verjüngungsforschung					35	0.2	▼0.2
ÖDP					32	0.2	
Bildet Berlin!					30	0.1	
Mieterpartei					27	0.1	
Klimaliste					19	0.1	
Humanists					19	0.1	
du.					17	0.1	
NPD					13	0.1	▼0.2
REP					12	0.1	
DKP					8	0.0	
LKR					7	0.0	▼0.4
Bergpartei, die ÜberPartei					4	0.0	
The Pinks/Alliance 21					4	0.0	
BüSo					2	0.0	Steady
SGP					1	0.0	Steady
Informal votes		170			131		
Total valid votes		21,210			21,236		
Turnout		21,400	71.5	▼4.3			
CDU hold	Majority	4,612	21.8				

== See also ==
- Politics of Berlin
- House of Representatives of Berlin
