= Stephan Schmidt (guitarist) =

Stephan Schmidt is a German-born classical guitarist now residing in Switzerland.

== Biography ==
He studied in Trossingen, Paris and New York City.

His recording (in 2000) of Bach's lute works (original versions) played on a multi-string guitar has been called the "a new reference recording of Bach's luteworks on the guitar" by Fono Forum and has received multiple 5-star ratings (BBC Music Magazine, Classic CD), praises.. & awards (Diapason d’Or, etc.).

In 1994 he was awarded the Grand Prix du Disque of the L'Académie Charles Cros for his recording of Maurice Ohana's complete works for guitar (on the ten-string guitar).

== Teaching ==
Schmidt taught at the Hochschule für Musik und Theater in Bern from 1998 to 2001. Since 2002 he has been director of the Hochschule für Musik Basel at the Musik-Akademie der Stadt Basel.
