= Friedrich Konrad Griepenkerl =

German philosopher, educationist, musicologist and musician (1782–1849)

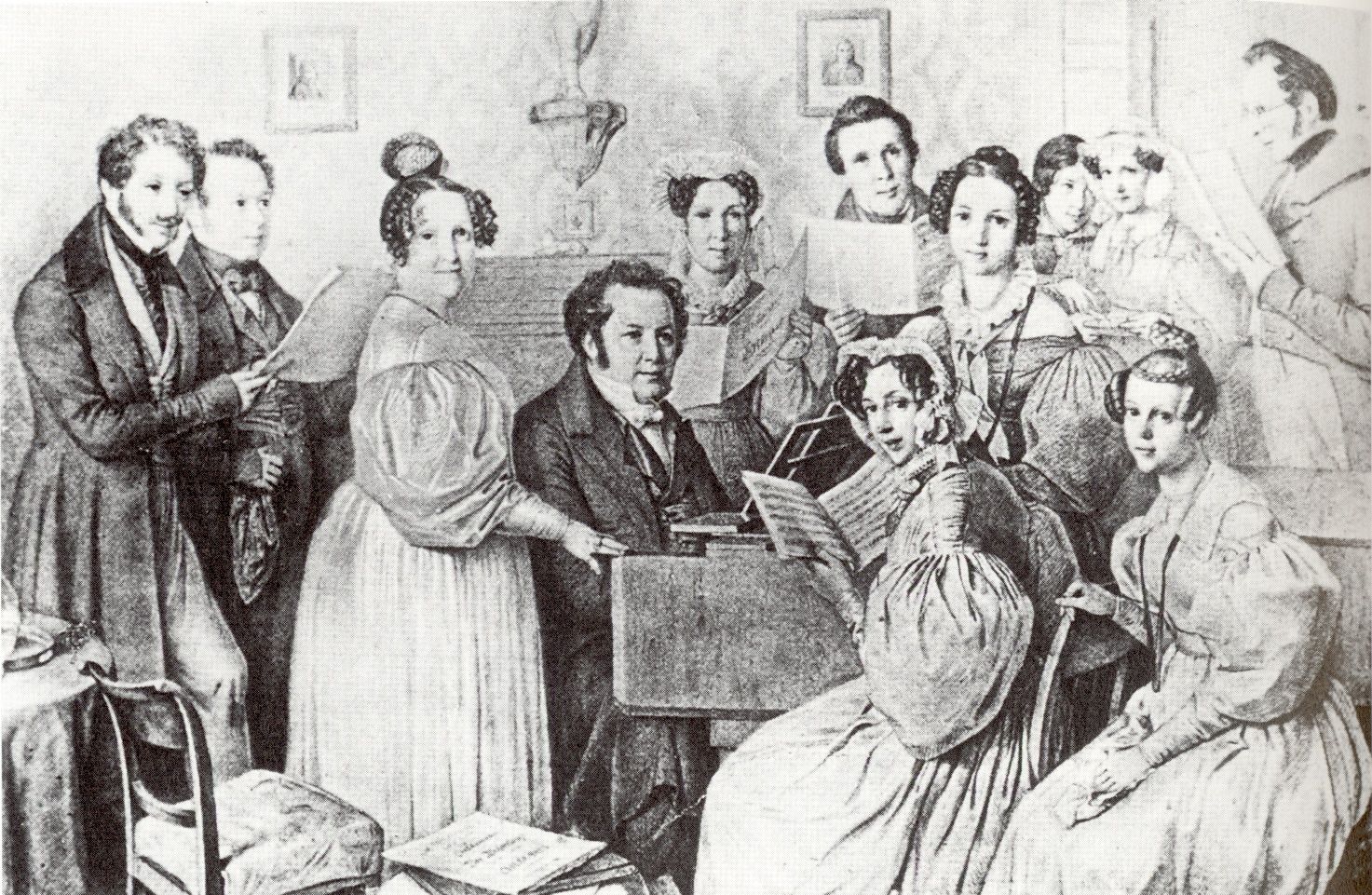
Friedrich Konrad Griepenkerl playing the grand piano, 1838

Friedrich Konrad Griepenkerl (10 December 1782 – 6 April 1849) was a German Germanist, pedagogue, musicologist and conductor.

== Life ==
Griepenkerl was born in Peine the son of a preacher. He first attended the school in Peine and changed in 1796 to the Martino-Katharineum Braunschweig. From 1805 to 1808, he studied theology at the Georg-August-Universität Göttingen, where he also studied philosophy and pedagogy with Johann Friedrich Herbart and philology with Christian Gottlob Heyne. In addition he studied music theory, piano and organ with Johann Sebastian Bach's devotee Johann Nikolaus Forkel.

In 1808, taking Herbart's advice, he went to Hofwil in Switzerland, where he became a teacher of the German language and literature at the newly founded Philipp Emanuel von Fellenberg Institute. He also directed the musical life of this school and the community.

=== University lecturer in Braunschweig ===
In 1816 he moved back to Braunschweig where he taught at the Katharineum. After receiving his doctorate in 1821, he was offered an extraordinary professorship for philosophy and fine sciences at the Collegium Carolinum, which was converted into a full professorship in 1825. In 1828, he took up an additional teaching position at the Gymnasium, where he taught German language and literature, mathematics and philosophy.

=== Musician and musicologist ===
Griepenkerl founded a singing academy in Braunschweig, which under his direction performed Bach's chorales and his Mass in B minor. He was a co-organizer of the Braunschweig music festivals of 1836, 1839 and 1841. Griepenkerl was in friendly contact with important musicians of his time, such as Carl Friedrich Zelter, Carl Maria von Weber, Gaspare Spontini, Louis Spohr, Giacomo Meyerbeer and Felix Mendelssohn. Together with Ferdinand August Roitzsch (1805–1889), he published a critical edition of J. S. Bach's piano and organ works in the years from 1837. He wrote the text for a great opera Pino di Porto by the Braunschweig court kapellmeister Georg Müller which was unsuccessful, however.

Griepenkerl died on 6 April 1849, in Braunschweig, aged 66.

=== Family ===
The older son Wolfgang Robert Griepenkerl (1810–1868) was a dramatist, storyteller and university lecturer at the Collegium Carolinum. The younger son Erich (1813–1888) was an official in Braunschweig. His son Otto Griepenkerl was a physician in Königslutter and paleontologist.

== Work ==
- Von den Formen der Deklinazion und Konjugazion ihrem Begriffe nach zur Begründung einer allgemeinen philosophischen Grammatik (1822)
- Lehrbuch der Ästhetik. Braunschweig (1826)
- Centifolie : ein Taschenbuch für das Jahr 1830; mit Kupfer u. Musik.
- Lehrbuch der Logik. (1828, new edition 1831)
- Briefe an einen jüngeren gelehrten Freund über Philosophie und besonders über Herbarts Lehren. Braunschweig (1832)
- Johann Sebastian Bach’s Compositionen für die Orgel. Critically corrected edition by Friedrich Conrad Griepenkerl and Ferdinand Roitzsch. Leipzig im Bureau de Musique von C. F. Peters, 10 vols. from 1837.
