= Wilhelm Friedemann Bach =

German composer and musician (1710–1784)

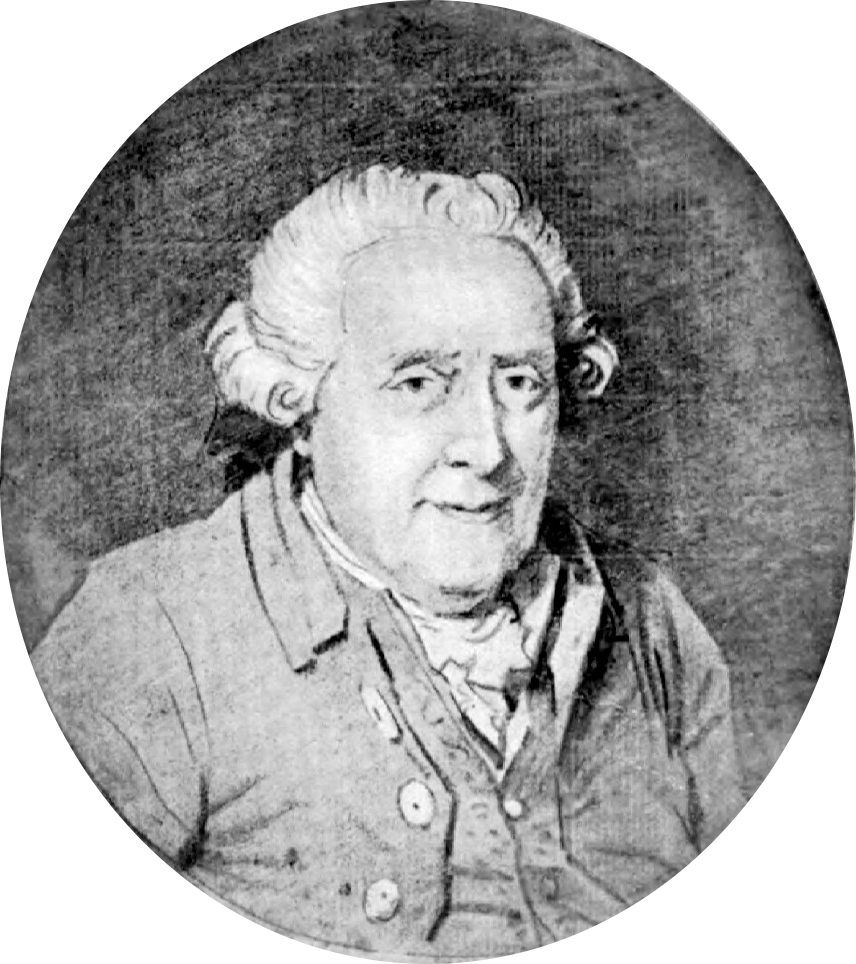
- Sketch of Wilhelm Friedemann Bach
- Born: 22 November 1710; Weimar
- Died: 1 July 1784 (aged 73); Berlin

Wilhelm Friedemann Bach (22 November 1710 – 1 July 1784) was a German composer, organist and harpsichordist. He was the second child and eldest son of Johann Sebastian Bach and Maria Barbara Bach. Despite his acknowledged genius as an improviser and composer, his income and employment were unstable, and he died in poverty.

== Life ==
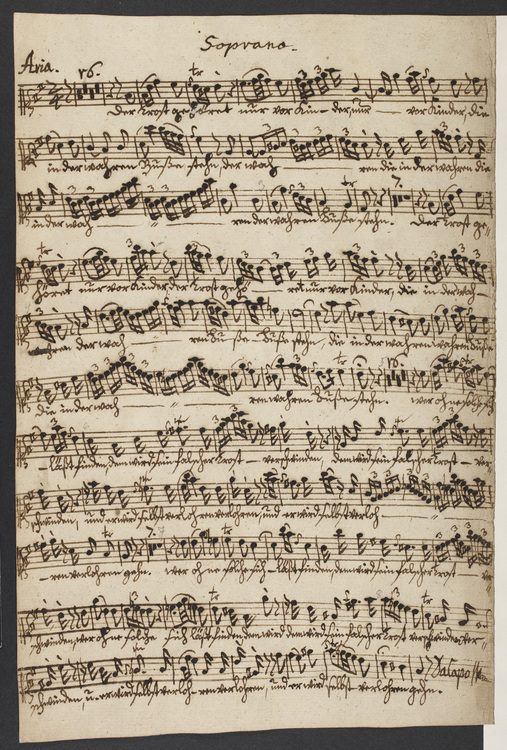
Manuscript copy of Der Trost gehöret (BR-WFB F26)

Polonaises 4 and 5
Performed by Sylvia Kind on a harpsichord of the type made in the early 20th century

Sinfonia in F major – 4. Menuetto
Performed by
Salzburg Chamber Philharmonic Orchestra
Yoon K. Lee (Conductor)
Courtesy of NAXOS

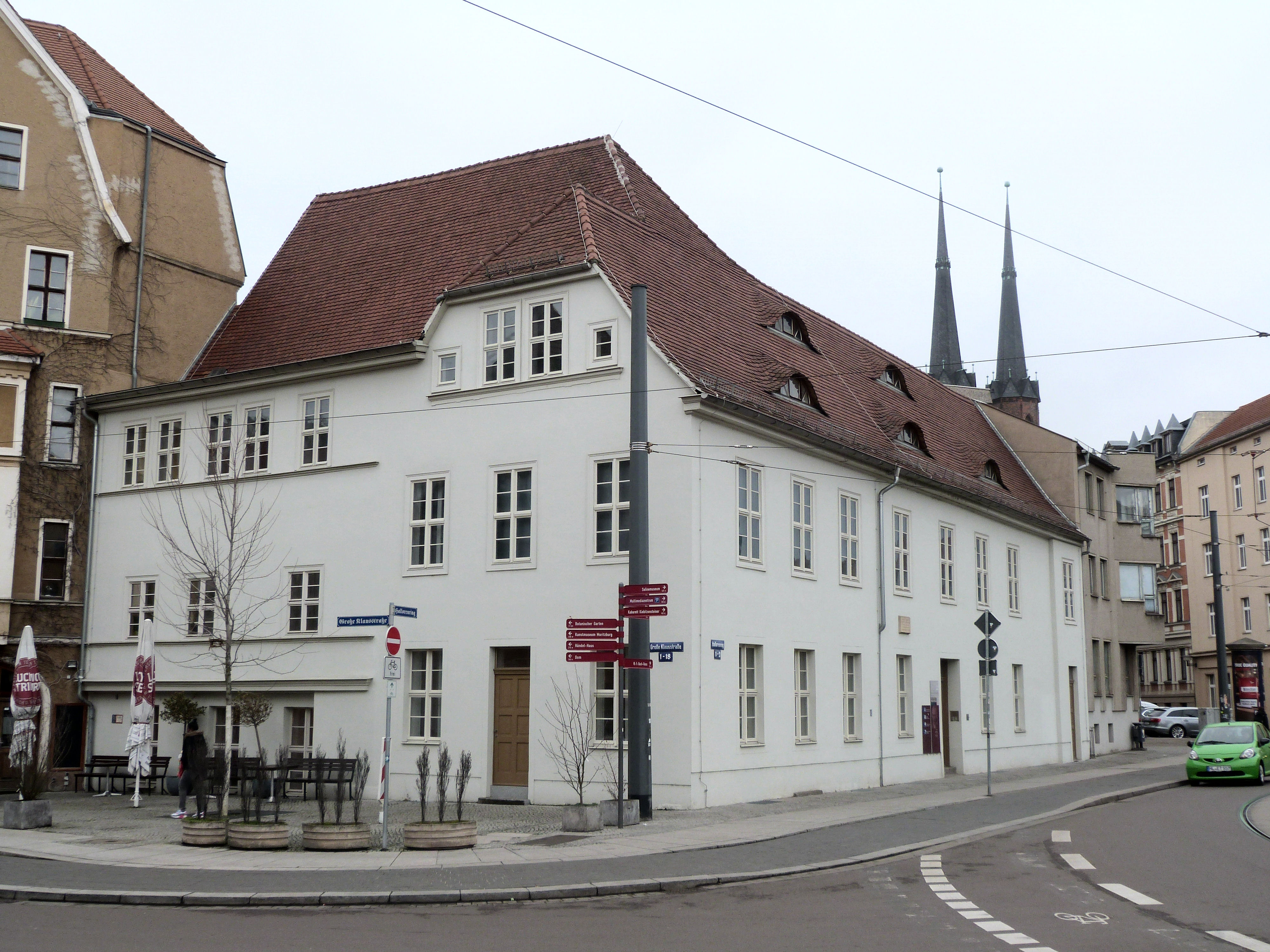
Wilhelm Friedemann Bach House (now a museum), where Friedemann lived in Halle

Wilhelm Friedemann (hereafter Friedemann) was born in Weimar, where his father was employed as organist and chamber musician to the Duke of Saxe-Weimar. In July 1720, when Friedemann was nine, his mother Maria Barbara Bach died suddenly; Johann Sebastian Bach remarried in December 1721. J. S. Bach supervised Friedemann's musical education and career with great attention. The graded course of keyboard studies and composition that J. S. Bach provided is documented in the Clavier-Büchlein vor Wilhelm Friedemann Bach (modern spelling: Klavierbüchlein für Wilhelm Friedemann Bach), with entries by both father and son. This education also included (parts of) the French Suites, (Two-Part) Inventions, (Three-Part) Sinfonias (popularly known as "Inventions"), the first volume of The Well-Tempered Clavier, and the six Trio Sonatas for organ. At the age of 16 he went to Merseburg to learn the violin with his teacher Johann Gottlieb Graun.

In addition to his musical training, Friedemann received formal schooling beginning in Weimar. When J. S. Bach took the post of Cantor of the St. Thomas Church in Leipzig (in 1723), he enrolled Friedemann in the associated Thomasschule. (J. S. Bach—who had himself been orphaned at the age of 10—said that he took the position in Leipzig partly because of the educational opportunities it afforded his children). On graduating in 1729, Friedemann enrolled as a law student in Leipzig University, a renowned institution at the time, but later moved on to study law and mathematics at the University of Halle. He maintained a lifelong interest in mathematics, and continued to study it privately during his first job in Dresden.

Friedemann was appointed in 1733 to the position of organist of the St. Sophia's Church at Dresden. In competing for the post he played a new version of his father's Prelude and Fugue in G Major, BWV 541. The judge described Friedemann as clearly superior to the other two candidates. He remained a renowned organist throughout his life. Among his many pupils in Dresden was Johann Gottlieb Goldberg, the keyboardist whose name is erroneously enshrined in the popular nickname given to J. S. Bach's 1742 publication, "Aria with Diverse Variations"—that is, "The Goldberg Variations." The scholar Peter Williams has discredited the story which links the work to Goldberg stating that J. S. Bach wrote the work for the Russian Ambassador Count Hermann Carl von Keyserlingk, who would ask his employee, Goldberg, to play the variations to entertain him during sleepless nights. Williams instead has argued that J. S. Bach wrote the variations to provide a display piece for Friedemann.

In 1746 Friedemann became organist of the Liebfrauenkirche at Halle. In 1751, Friedemann married Dorothea Elisabeth Georgi (1721–1791), who was 11 years his junior and who outlived him by seven years. Dorothea was the daughter of a tax collector. The landed estates she inherited caused the family to be placed in a high tax bracket by Halle authorities, who were raising taxes to meet the revenue demands of the Seven Years' War. To raise cash for these payments, she sold part of her property in 1770. The couple produced two sons and a daughter, Friederica Sophia (born in 1757), who was the only one of their offspring to live past infancy. The descendants of Friederica Sophia eventually migrated to Oklahoma.

Friedemann was deeply unhappy in Halle almost from the beginning of his tenure. In 1749 he was involved in a conflict with the Cantor of the Liebfrauenkirche, Gottfried Mittag, who had misappropriated funds that were due to Friedemann. In 1750 the church authorities reprimanded Friedemann for overstaying a leave of absence (he was in Leipzig settling his father's estate). In 1753 he made his first documented attempt to find another post, and thereafter made several others. All these attempts failed. Bach had at least two pupils, Friedrich Wilhelm Rust and Johann Samuel Petri.

In 1762, he negotiated for the post of Kapellmeister to the court of Darmstadt; although he protracted the negotiations for reasons that are opaque to historians and did not actively take the post, he nevertheless was appointed Hofkapellmeister of Hessen-Darmstadt, a title he used in the dedication of his Harpsichord Concerto in E minor.

In June 1764, Friedemann left the job in Halle without any employment secured elsewhere. His financial situation deteriorated so much that in 1768 he re-applied for his old job in Halle, without success. He thereafter supported himself by teaching. After leaving Halle in 1770, he lived for several years (1771–1774) in Braunschweig where he applied in vain for the post of an organist at the St. Catherine's church. Then he moved to Berlin, where he initially was welcomed by the princess Anna Amalia (the sister of Frederick the Great). Later, no longer in favor at court, he gave harpsichord lessons to Sarah Levy, the daughter of a prominent Jewish family in Berlin and an avid collector of Bach and other early 18th-century music, who was also a "patron" of Friedemann's brother C. P. E. Bach. Friedemann died in Berlin.

Earlier biographers have concluded that his "wayward" and difficult personality reduced his ability to gain and hold secure employment, but the scholar David Schulenberg writes (in the Oxford Composer Companion: J. S. Bach, ed. Malcolm Boyd, 1999) that "he may also have been affected by changing social conditions that made it difficult for a self-possessed virtuoso to succeed in a church- or court-related position" (p. 39). Schulenberg adds, "he was evidently less willing than most younger contemporaries to compose fashionable, readily accessible music".

Friedemann Bach was renowned for his improvisatory skills. It is speculated that when in Leipzig his father's accomplishments set so high a bar that he focused on improvisation rather than composition. Evidence adduced for this speculation includes the fact that his compositional output increased in Dresden and Halle.

Friedemann's compositions include many church cantatas and instrumental works, of which the most notable are the fugues, polonaises and fantasias for clavier, and the duets for two flutes. He incorporated more elements of the contrapuntal style learned from his father than any of his three composer brothers, but his use of the style has an individualistic and improvisatory edge which endeared his work to musicians of the late 19th century, when there was something of a revival of his reputation.

Friedemann's students included Johann Nikolaus Forkel, who in 1802 published the first biography of Johann Sebastian Bach; Friedemann, as well as his younger brother Carl Philipp Emanuel Bach, were major informants for Forkel. Friedemann has in earlier biographies been called a poor custodian of his father's musical manuscripts, many of which he inherited; however, more recent scholars are uncertain how many were lost. It is known that Friedemann sold some of his father's collection to raise cash to pay debts (including a large sale in 1759 to Johann Georg Nacke). Also, his daughter took some of the Sebastian Bach manuscripts, and these were passed on to her descendants, who inadvertently destroyed many of them after moving to the United States. Others were passed on through his only known Berlin pupil, Sarah Itzig Levy, great-aunt of Felix Mendelssohn. Some of his scores were collected by Carl Friedrich Christian Fasch and his pupil Carl Friedrich Zelter, the teacher of Felix Mendelssohn and through them these materials were placed in the library of the Sing-Akademie zu Berlin, which Fasch founded in 1791 and of which Zelter took charge in 1800.

Friedemann is known occasionally to have claimed credit for music written by his father, but this was in keeping with common musical practices in the era.

== Works ==
"BR-WFB" denotes "Bach-Repertorium Wilhelm Friedemann Bach". "Fk." denotes "Falck catalogue". Bach Digital Work (BDW) pages contain information about individual compositions.

Works by Wilhelm Friedemann Bach
BR- WFB	Name	Fk.	Notes	BDW
=== Keyboard works ===
A1	Keyboard Sonata in C major	Add. 200		09359
A2a	Keyboard Sonata in C major	1B	earlier version	08713
A2b	Keyboard Sonata in C major	1A	later version	09361
A3	Keyboard Sonata in C major	2		09363
A4	Keyboard Sonata in D major	3		08813
A5	Keyboard Sonata in D major	4		09365
A6	Sonata for two harpsichords in D major	11	lost	09367
A7	Keyboard Sonata in E♭ major	5		08697
A8	Keyboard Sonata in E♭ major	Add. 201		09369
A9	Keyboard Sonata in E minor	Add. 204	related to flute sonata B17	09371
A10	Keyboard Sonata in F major	Add. 202		09373
A11a	Keyboard Sonata in F major	6C	earliest version	09375
A11b	Keyboard Sonata in F major	6B	middle version	08715
A11c	Keyboard Sonata in F major	6	latest version	09377
A11d	Keyboard Sonata in F major	deest	alternative version; related to flute sonata B18	09379
A12	Concerto for two harpsichords in F major	10	= BWV Anh. 188	01499
A13a	Concerto for harpsichord solo in G major	deest	earlier version	08711
A13b	Concerto for harpsichord solo in G major	40	later version	09381
A14	Keyboard Sonata in G major	7		09383
A15	Keyboard Sonata in A major	8		09385
A16	Keyboard Sonata in B♭ major	9		09387
A17	Fantasia in C major	14	not before 1770	09624
A18	2 Fantasias in C minor	15	composed for Georg von Behr around 1775	09626
A19	2 Fantasias in C minor	16	composed for Georg von Behr around 1775	09628
A20	Fantasia in D major	17	not before 1770	09630
A21	Fantasia in D minor	18	not before 1770	08845
A22	Fantasia in D minor	19	not before 1770	09632
A23	Fantasia in E minor	20	October 1770	09634
A24	Fantasia in E minor	21	not before 1770	09636
A25	Fantasia in G major	22	around 1763	09638
A26	Fantasia in C major/A minor	23	unfinished	09640
A27	Twelve Polonaises	12	No. 1 in C major; composed between 1765–1770	09517
A28	Twelve Polonaises	12	No. 2 in C minor; composed between 1765–1770	09642
A29	Twelve Polonaises	12	No. 3 in D major; composed between 1765–1770	09644
A30	Twelve Polonaises	12	No. 4 in D minor; composed between 1765–1770	09646
A31	Twelve Polonaises	12	No. 5 in E♭ major; composed between 1765–1770	09649
A32	Twelve Polonaises	12	No. 6 in E♭ minor; composed between 1765–1770	09651
A33	Twelve Polonaises	12	No. 7 in E major; composed between 1765–1770	09653
A34	Twelve Polonaises	12	No. 8 in E minor; composed between 1765–1770	09655
A35	Twelve Polonaises	12	No. 9 in F major; composed between 1765–1770	09657
A36	Twelve Polonaises	12	No. 10 in F minor; composed between 1765–1770	09659
A37	Twelve Polonaises	12	No. 11 in G major; composed between 1765–1770	09661
A38	Twelve Polonaises	12	No. 12 in G minor; composed between 1765–1770	09663
A39	Harpsichord Suite in G minor	24	early work	09665
A40	Two Allemandes in G minor for keyboard	Add. 205	by W. F. and/or J. S. Bach; in Klavierbüchlein WFB; = BWV 836	00975
A41	Two Allemandes in G minor for keyboard	Add. 205	by W. F. and/or J. S. Bach; in Klavierbüchlein WFB; frag.; = BWV 837	00976
A42	Minuet in G major	deest	by W. F. and/or J. S. Bach; in Klavierbüchlein WFB; frag.; = BWV 841	00980
A43	Minuet in G minor	deest	by W. F. and/or J. S. Bach; in Klavierbüchlein WFB; frag.; = BWV 842	00981
A44	Prelude in C major	Add. 206	by W. F. and/or J. S. Bach; in Klavierbüchlein WFB; = BWV 924a	01099
A45	Prelude in D major	Add. 206	by W. F. and/or J. S. Bach; in Klavierbüchlein WFB; = BWV 925	01100
A46	Prelude in E minor	Add. 206	by W. F. and/or J. S. Bach; in Klavierbüchlein WFB; = BWV 932	01107
A47	Prelude in A minor	Add. 206	by W. F. and/or J. S. Bach; in Klavierbüchlein WFB; = BWV 931	01106
A48	Minuet in G minor	25/1		09199
A49a	Presto in D minor	25/2	2 versions; A49b is variant of BWV 970 ("Toccatina" No. 6)	09201
A49b	Presto in D minor	25/2	2 versions; A49b is variant of BWV 970 ("Toccatina" No. 6)	01147
A49b var	Toccatina No. 6	25/2	variant of A49b; = BWV 970	11148
A50a	Minuet in F major with Trio in F minor	Add. 208	2 versions	09667
A50b	Minuet in F major with Trio in F minor	Add. 208	2 versions	09669
A51a	Bourlesca in C major	26		09671
A51b	L'imitation de la chasse in C major	26	revision of A51a	08708
A51c	La Caccia in C major	26	revision of A51b; last version	09673
A52	La Reveille in C major	27		08726
A53a	Gigue in G major	28	earlier version	09675
A53b	Gigue in G major	28	later version; also final movement of flute duet B2	08729
A54a	keyboard Piece/Prelude in C minor	29	earlier version; incomplete	09174
A54b	keyboard Piece/Prelude in C minor	29	later version; completion possibly by Johann Nikolaus Forkel	11443
A55	Scherzo in E minor	deest	not ascertained; also in "Toccatina"; = BWV 844a	00984
A56	March in E♭ major	30		09677
A57	March in F major	deest		09679
A58	Polonaise in C major with trio in C minor	13		09681
A59	Ouverture for harpsichord in E♭ major	deest	not before 1770	09683
A60	Andante for harpsichord in E minor	Add. 209	Berlin period; originally middle movement of A13	09685
A61	Allegro non troppo in G major	Add. 203	Berlin period 1775–1785; lost	09687
A62	Un poco allegro in C major	deest	Berlin period	09689
A63	18 pieces for a musical clock	Add. 207	No. 1 in G major; not before 1763; = BWV Anh. 133	01444
A64	18 pieces for a musical clock	Add. 207	No. 2 in G major; not before 1763; = BWV Anh. 134	01445
A65	18 pieces for a musical clock	Add. 207	No. 3 in A minor; not before 1763; = BWV Anh. 135	01446
A66	18 pieces for a musical clock	Add. 207	No. 4 in A minor; not before 1763; = BWV Anh. 136	01447
A67	18 pieces for a musical clock	Add. 207	No. 5 in E♭ major; not before 1763; = BWV Anh. 137	01448
A68	18 pieces for a musical clock	Add. 207	No. 6 in E♭ major; not before 1763; = BWV Anh. 138	01449
A69	18 pieces for a musical clock	Add. 207	No. 7 in D major; not before 1763; = BWV Anh. 139	01450
A70	18 pieces for a musical clock	Add. 207	No. 8 in D minor; not before 1763; = BWV Anh. 140	01451
A71	18 pieces for a musical clock	Add. 207	No. 9 in F major; not before 1763; = BWV Anh. 141	01452
A72	18 pieces for a musical clock	Add. 207	No. 10 in A minor; not before 1763; = BWV Anh. 142	01453
A73	18 pieces for a musical clock	Add. 207	No. 11 in E minor; not before 1763; = BWV Anh. 143	01454
A74	18 pieces for a musical clock	Add. 207	No. 12 in A minor; not before 1763; = BWV Anh. 144	01455
A75	18 pieces for a musical clock	Add. 207	No. 13 in C major; not before 1763; = BWV Anh. 145	01456
A76	18 pieces for a musical clock	Add. 207	No. 14 in F major; not before 1763; = BWV Anh. 146	01457
A77	18 pieces for a musical clock	Add. 207	No. 15 in G major; not before 1763; = BWV Anh. 147	01458
A78	18 pieces for a musical clock	Add. 207	No. 16 in G minor; not before 1763; = BWV Anh. 148	01459
A79	18 pieces for a musical clock	Add. 207	No. 17 in G major; not before 1763; = BWV Anh. 149	01460
A80	18 pieces for a musical clock	Add. 207	No. 18 in G minor; not before 1763; = BWV Anh. 150	01461
A81	Eight fugues	31	No. 1 in C major; Berlin period	09513
A82	Eight fugues	31	No. 2 in C minor; Berlin period	09691
A83	Eight fugues	31	No. 3 in D major; Berlin period	09693
A84	Eight fugues	31	No. 4 in D minor; Berlin period	09695
A85	Eight fugues	31	No. 5 in E♭ major; Berlin period	09697
A86	Eight fugues	31	No. 6 in E minor; Berlin period	09699
A87	Eight fugues	31	No. 7 in B♭ major; Berlin period	09701
A88	Eight fugues	31	No. 8 in F minor; Berlin period	09703
A89	Fugue in C minor	32	probably late 1740s	09705
A90	Fugue in F major	33		09707
A91	Fugue for organ in F major	36	authenticity doubted	08694
A92	Fugue for organ in G minor	37	authenticity doubted	09709
A93	Seven chorale preludes for organ	38, 1	Nun komm der Heiden Heiland; authenticity doubted	09712
A94	Seven chorale preludes for organ	38, 1	Christe, der du bist Tag und Licht; authenticity doubted	09715
A95	Seven chorale preludes for organ	38, 1	Jesu, meine Freude; authenticity doubted	09717
A96	Seven chorale preludes for organ	38, 1	Durch Adams Fall ist ganz verderbt; authenticity doubted	09719
A97	Seven chorale preludes for organ	38, 1	Wir danken dir, Herr Jesu Christ; authenticity doubted	09721
A98	Seven chorale preludes for organ	38, 1	Was mein Gott will; authenticity doubted	09723
A99	Seven chorale preludes for organ	38, 1	Wir Christenleut; authenticity doubted	09725
A100	Trio for organ	38, 2	on "Allein Gott in der Höh sei Ehr"; lost	09727
A101	Four chorale preludes for organ	deest	Christus, der ist mein Leben	09729
A102	Four chorale preludes for organ	deest	Die Seele Christi heilige mich	09731
A103	Four chorale preludes for organ	deest	Sei Lob und Ehr dem höchsten Gut	09733
A104	Four chorale preludes for organ	deest	Nun freut euch, lieben Christen	09735
A105	Two fantasias	deest	D minor	09737
A106	Two fantasias	deest	G major	09739
A107	Two keyboard pieces	deest	D major	09741
A108	Two keyboard pieces	deest	D minor	09743
A109	Minuet in C major with Trio in C minor	deest		09745
A110	Minuet with 13 variations in G major	deest	Berlin period	09747
=== Chamber music ===
B1	Six duets for two flutes	54	No. 1 in E minor; 1740–1745; supplement by J. S. Bach (1745)	09389
B2	Six duets for two flutes	59	No. 2 in G major; 1740–1745; only one with four movements	09391
B3	Six duets for two flutes	55	No. 3 in E♭ major; 1740–1745	09393
B4	Six duets for two flutes	57	No. 4 in F major; 1740–1745	09395
B5	Six duets for two flutes	56	No. 5 in E♭ major; Berlin period	09397
B6	Six duets for two flutes	58	No. 6 in F minor; Berlin period	09399
B7	Three duets for two violas	60	No. 1 in C major; Berlin period (& older material)	09401
B8	Three duets for two violas	61	No. 2 in G major; Berlin period (& older material)	09403
B9	Three duets for two violas	62	No. 3 in G minor; Berlin period (& older material)	09405
B10	Three sonatas for flute and continuo	51	No. 1 in F major; likely Dresden period; lost	09749
B11	Three sonatas for flute and continuo	52	No. 2 in A minor; likely Dresden period; lost	09751
B12	Three sonatas for flute and continuo	53	No. 3 in D major; likely Dresden period; lost	09753
B13	Trio in D major	47	for two flutes and continuo; c. 1735–1739 (Dresden)	09194
B14	Trio in D major	48	for two flutes and continuo; c. 1735–1739 (Dresden)	09407
B15	Trio in A minor	49	for two flutes and continuo; c. 1735–1739 (Dresden); unfinished	09196
B16	Trio in B♭ major	50	for two violins (or flute, violin) and continuo; probably Halle period	09409
B17	Sonata in E minor for flute and continuo	deest	probably Dresden period; middle movement also in A10	09411
B18	Sonata in F major for flute and continuo	deest	probably Dresden period; movements also in A11b, A2a and A11d	09413
B‑Inc.19	Trio in B major	unsicher	for violin and harpsichord; authorship unlikely	09415
=== Orchestral works ===
C1	Sinfonia in C major	63	likely before 1740	09421
C2	Sinfonia in F major	67	likely before 1740; Minuet also in A50a–b, A2b and A11c	09423
C3	Sinfonia in G major	68	likely before 1740	09425
C4	Sinfonia in G major	69	likely before 1740	09427
C5	Sinfonia in B♭ major	71	likely before 1740	09429
C6	Sinfonia in A major	70	likely before 1740; fragment	09431
C7	Sinfonia in D minor	65	likely for liturgical use, written in Dresden around or after 1740	09176
C8	Sinfonia in D major	64	c. 1755 (Halle); used as overture to F13 (and to G1, BWV 205a?)	09159
C9	Harpsichord Concerto in D major	41	two versions: likely c. 1740 (Dresden), and copy from c. 1765–1770	09564
C10	Harpsichord Concerto in E♭ major	42	unfinished; reused in F14	09755
C11	Concerto for two harpsichords	46	in E♭ major; likely c. 1775	09417
C12	Harpsichord Concerto in E minor	43	probably around 1767	09759
C13	Harpsichord Concerto in F major	44	probably around 1740	09762
C14	Harpsichord Concerto in A minor	45	before 1740	09764
C15	Concerto for flute and orchestra in D major	unecht	probably made in Berlin after 1775	09419
C‑Inc.16	Sinfonia in D major	deest	authenticity doubtful; 1730s?	09433
C17	Harpsichord Concerto in G minor	unsicher	by C. P. E. Bach?; probably late Dresden period	09936
=== Liturgical works ===
E1	Kyrie–Gloria Mass in G minor	100	Gloria in German; early Halle period; = BWV Anh. 168	01479
E2	Kyrie–Gloria Mass in D minor	98	partially in German	09766
E3	Heilig ist Gott, der Herr Zebaoth	78a	chorus; probably c. 1752; adapted to F24	09768
E4	Agnus Dei in D minor	98b	parody of E2, movement 5	09770
E5	Amen and Alleluja	99	chorus; parody of E2, movement 5; probably Halle period	08148
E6	Amen and Alleluja	99	chorus; parody of F6, movement 1b; probably Halle period	09772
=== Sacred cantatas ===
F1	Lasset uns ablegen die Werke der Finsternis	80	cantata for 1st Sunday of Advent (30 November 1749)	09449
F2	O Wunder, wer kann dieses fassen	92	cantata for 1st Christmas Day; c. 1755–1758?; mvt. 6 = F11, mvt. 6	09774
F3	Ach, daß du den Himmel zerrissest	93	cantata for 1st Christmas Day; probably after 1755; variant: F15	09776
F4	Ehre sei Gott in der Höhe	Add. 250	cantata for 1st Christmas Day; c. 1759?	09778
F5	Der Herr zu deiner Rechten	73	cantata for New Year/Circumcision; probably c. 1750 or earlier	09780
F6	Wir sind Gottes Werk	74	cantata for 2nd Sunday of Epiphany; parody of F8	09782
F7	Wie schön leuchtet der Morgenstern	82	cantata for 6th Sunday of Epiphany (12 Feb 1764?); ↔ F6, F17, E6	09784
F8	Cantata	74a	cantata for Palm Sunday; lost; adapted to F6	09786
F9	Erzittert und fallet	83	cantata for 1st Easter Day	09788
F10	Gott fähret auf mit Jauchzen	75	cantata for Ascension Day	09790
F11	Wo geht die Lebensreise hin?	91	cantata for Ascension Day	09792
F12	Wer mich liebet, der wird mein Wort halten	72	cantata for 1st Day of Pentecost	09795
F13	Dies ist der Tag	85	cantata for 1st Day of Pentecost	09797
F14	Ertönt, ihr seligen Völker	88	cantata for 1st Day of Pentecost	08146
F15	Ach, daß du den Himmel zerrissest	93	cantata for 1st Day of Pentecost; parody of F3	09799
F16	Es ist eine Stimme eines Predigers	89	cantata for St. John's Day (24 June)	09801
F17	Der Herr wird mit Gerechtigkeit	81	cantata for Visitation (2 July)	09803
F18	Ach Gott vom Himmel, sieh darein	96	cantata for 10th Sunday after Trinity	09805
F19	Wohl dem, der den Herren fürchtet	76	cantata for unknown purpose	09807
F20	Introduction to a catechism sermon	77	pasticcio, partially based on BWV 170/1 and 147.1/1	09809
F21	Der Höchste erhöret das Flehen der Armen	86	cantata for leave-taking of pastor Herrnschmidt (3 October 1756)	09811
F22	Verhängnis, dein Wüten entkräftet	87	cantata for 7th Sunday after Trinity (24 Juli 1757)	09447
F23	Auf, Christen, posaunt	95	cantata for the end of the Seven Years' War (1762 or 1763)	08139
F24	Lobet Gott, unsern Herrn Zebaoth	78b	chorus; after c. 1752; parody of E3	08141
F25	Dienet dem Herrn mit Freuden	84	chorus; likely 1755	08143
F26	Der Trost gehöret nur für Kinder	89/3	aria; after F16, mvt. 3	09813
F27	Zerbrecht, zerreist, ihr schnöden Banden	94	song	09815
F28	Laß dein Wehen in mir spielen	96/4	song; after F18, mvt. 4	09817
F29	aria "... Gnaden ein, ..."	79	fragment	09819
F30	Auf, Christen, posaunt	95	cantata for unknown purpose; after F23	09821
=== Secular Cantata and Opera ===
G1	O Himmel, schone	90	cantata for Frederick II's birthday (24 January 1758); mostly parody	09824
G2	Lausus und Lydie	106	opera; c. 1778–1779; lost (likely unfinished)	09826
=== Song ===
H1	Herz, mein Herz, sei ruhig	97	Cantilena Nuptiarum; wedding; after 1774; reuses keyboard music	08179
=== Miscellaneous works ===
I1	Canons and contrapuntal studies	39	by W. F. and J. S. Bach; c. 1736–1739	01719
I2	Four Triple Canons for 6 voices	deest	published by J. P. Kirnberger in 1777 (Kunst des reinen Satzes II/2)	10487
I3	Four Triple Canons for 6 voices	deest	published by J. P. Kirnberger in 1777 (Kunst des reinen Satzes II/2)	11130
I4	Four Triple Canons for 6 voices	deest	published by J. P. Kirnberger in 1777 (Kunst des reinen Satzes II/2)	11131
I5	Four Triple Canons for 6 voices	deest	published by J. P. Kirnberger in 1777 (Kunst des reinen Satzes II/2)	11132
I6	Fugal exposition for organ in C major	35	1771	11133
I7	Fugue exposition on B-A-C-H for organ	deest	1773	11134
I8	Abhandlung vom harmonischen Dreiklang	deest	Music theory (Treatise on the harmonic triad); 1750s; lost	11135
I9	Rechtmäßige Vertheidigung	deest	Defense against Johann Gottlieb Biedermann; 1750	11136
=== Doubtful and spurious works ===
YA21	Arioso con Variazioni in G minor		for keyboard; doubtful	11129
YA149	Three fugues for organ	Add. 211	No. 1 in C minor; doubtful	09828
YA150	Three fugues for organ	Add. 211	No. 2 in B♭ major; doubtful	09830
YA151	Three fugues for organ	Add. 211	No. 2 in A minor; doubtful	09832
YB1	Trio in G major	unecht	for two traversos and viola; also attributed to W. F. E. Bach	11545
YB2	Trio in C major	unecht	for two traversos and continuo; also attributed to W. F. E. Bach	02187
YB3	Sonata or Trio in F major	unsicher	for flute/violin and harpsichord/continuo; attr. to several Bachs	02187
YB5	Sextet in E♭ major		for winds and strings; also attributed to W. F. E. Bach	11417
YB6	Sonata in E♭ major		for violin and harpsichord; doubtful	11547
YC1	Harpsichord Concerto in C minor	unecht	attributed to C. Schaffrath	11548

=== More lost, doubtful and spurious works ===
- Fk. 34 – Fugue in B♭ major: not by any Bach family member
- Fk. 66 – Sinfonia in D minor: spurious
- Fk. 101–105 – lost cantatas
- Orchestral Suite in G Minor, BWV 1070 (possibly spurious)
- Scherzo in D minor, BWV 844, attributed to both W. F. and J. S. Bach.

== Reception ==
=== Use by later composers ===
Wolfgang Amadeus Mozart's set of six Preludes and Fugues for string trio, K. 404a, contains five fugues transcribed from The Well-Tempered Clavier by Johann Sebastian Bach while the sixth fugue in F minor, is a transcription of one of the Eight Fugues (Falck 31) of Wilhelm Friedemann Bach. The preludes in K. 404a are Mozart's own, (Note: The authenticity has been put in doubt by recent scholars.) except for 4 (from BWV 527) and 5 (second movement from BWV 526).

=== Film ===
Friedemann Bach is a 1941 German historical drama film directed by Traugott Müller and starring Gustaf Gründgens, Leny Marenbach and Johannes Riemann. The film depicts the life of Johann Sebastian Bach's son Wilhelm Friedemann Bach. It is based on Albert Emil Brachvogel's novel Friedemann Bach. Wilhelm Friedemann Bach is shown as a gifted son trying to escape his father's shadow.

== Sources ==
- Applegate, Celia, Bach in Berlin: Nation and Culture in Mendelssohn's Revival of the St. Mathew Passion, Cornell University Press, Ithaca and London, 2005, ISBN 978-0-8014-7972-4
- The New Grove Dictionary served as a source for revision.
- Schulenberg, David: entry on Wilhelm Friedemann Bach in The Oxford Composer Companion: J.S.Bach (ed. Malcolm Boyd, 1999: ISBN 978-0-19-866208-2)
- The harpsichord concertos of Wilhelm Friedemann Bach
- Moore, John Weeks (1880) [1854]. "Bach, Wilhelm Friedemann" . Complete Encyclopaedia of Music. New York: C. H. Ditson & Company.
