= List of chamber music works by Johann Sebastian Bach =

Chamber music by Johann Sebastian Bach refers to the compositions in the tenth chapter of the Bach-Werke-Verzeichnis (BWV, catalogue of Bach's compositions), or, in the New Bach Edition, the compositions in Series VI. Chamber music is understood as containing:

- Works for solo violin, cello or flute (not including works for solo keyboard instruments or lute which are contained elsewhere in the BWV catalogue and the New Bach Edition);
- Chamber music works for two or more players (where concertos for multiple players, and orchestral suites also fall outside the chamber music designation)

== Works for solo violin, cello or flute ==
=== Sonatas and partitas for solo violin (BWV 1001–1006) ===
- BWV 1001 – Sonata No. 1 in G minor
- BWV 1002 – Partita No. 1 in B minor
- BWV 1003 – Sonata No. 2 in A minor
- BWV 1004 – Partita No. 2 in D minor
- BWV 1005 – Sonata No. 3 in C major
- BWV 1006 – Partita No. 3 in E major
  - BWV 1006a – Suite in E major for solo lute (transcription of Partita No. 3 for solo violin, BWV 1006)

=== Suites for solo cello (BWV 1007–1012) ===
- BWV 1007 – Cello Suite No. 1 in G major
- BWV 1008 – Cello Suite No. 2 in D minor
- BWV 1009 – Cello Suite No. 3 in C major
- BWV 1010 – Cello Suite No. 4 in E♭ major
- BWV 1011 – Cello Suite No. 5 in C minor
- BWV 1012 – Cello Suite No. 6 in D major

=== Partita for solo flute (BWV 1013) ===
- BWV 1013 – Partita in A minor for solo flute

== Two or more instruments ==
=== Six sonatas for violin and harpsichord (BWV 1014–1019) ===
- BWV 1014 – Sonata in B minor for violin and harpsichord
- BWV 1015 – Sonata in A major for violin and harpsichord
- BWV 1016 – Sonata in E major for violin and harpsichord
- BWV 1017 – Sonata in C minor for violin and harpsichord
- BWV 1018 – Sonata in F minor for violin and harpsichord
  - BWV 1018a – Adagio in F minor for violin and harpsichord (early version of movement 3 from BWV 1018)
- BWV 1019 – Sonata in G major for violin and harpsichord
  - BWV 1019a – Sonata in G major for violin and harpsichord (earlier version of BWV 1019)

=== Other works for accompanied violin (BWV 1020–1026) ===
- BWV 1020 – Sonata in G minor for violin (or flute) and harpsichord (now attributed to Carl Philipp Emanuel Bach – H 542.5)
- BWV 1021 – Sonata in G major for violin and basso continuo
- BWV 1022 – Sonata in F major for violin and harpsichord (doubtful, possibly by C. P. E. Bach)
- BWV 1023 – Sonata in E minor for violin and basso continuo
- BWV 1024 – Sonata in C minor for violin and basso continuo (doubtful)
- BWV 1025 – Suite in A major for violin and harpsichord (after a sonata by Sylvius Leopold Weiss) (doubtful, possibly by C. P. E. Bach)
- BWV 1026 – Fugue in G minor for violin and basso continuo (doubtful)

=== Sonatas for viola da gamba and harpsichord (BWV 1027–1029) ===
- BWV 1027 – Sonata No. 1 in G major for viola da gamba and harpsichord (arrangement of BWV 1039)
  - BWV 1027a – Trio in G major for organ (arrangement of movement 4 from BWV 1027)
- BWV 1028 – Sonata No. 2 in D major for viola da gamba and harpsichord
- BWV 1029 – Sonata No. 3 in G minor for viola da gamba and harpsichord

=== Sonatas for accompanied flute (BWV 1030–1035) ===
- BWV 1030 – Sonata in B minor for flute and harpsichord
  - BWV 1030a – Sonata in G minor for harpsichord and unknown instrument (oboe or viola da gamba conjectured) – earlier version of BWV 1030 of which only harpsichord part survives
- BWV 1031 – Sonata in E♭ major for flute and harpsichord (doubtful, possibly by Carl Philipp Emanuel Bach as H 545)
- BWV 1032 – Sonata in A major for flute and harpsichord
- BWV 1033 – Sonata in C major for flute and basso continuo (doubtful, possibly by C. P. E. Bach)
- BWV 1034 – Sonata in E minor for flute and basso continuo
- BWV 1035 – Sonata in E major for flute and basso continuo

=== Trio sonatas (BWV 1036–1040) ===
- BWV 1036 – Sonata in D minor for 2 violins and basso continuo (now attributed to Carl Philipp Emanuel Bach)
- BWV 1037 – Sonata in C major for 2 violins and basso continuo (now attributed to Johann Gottlieb Goldberg)
- BWV 1038 – Sonata in G major for flute, violin and basso continuo (doubtful, possibly by C. P. E. Bach)
- BWV 1039 – Sonata in G major for 2 flutes and basso continuo
- BWV 1040 – Canonic sonata in F major for oboe, violin and basso continuo

== Chamber music works in the 10th chapter of the Bach-Werke-Verzeichnis (1998) ==
Legend to the table
column		content
1	BWV	Bach-Werke-Verzeichnis (lit. 'Bach-works-catalogue'; BWV) numbers. Anhang (Annex; Anh.) numbers are indicated as follows: preceded by I: in Anh. I (lost works) of BWV^{1} (1950 first edition of the BWV); preceded by II: in Anh. II (doubtful works) of BWV^{1}; preceded by III: in Anh. III (spurious works) of BWV^{1}; preceded by N: new Anh. numbers in BWV^{2} (1990) and/or BWV^{2a} (1998)
2	^{2a}	Section in which the composition appears in BWV^{2a}: Chapters of the main catalogue indicated by Arabic numerals (1-13); Anh. sections indicated by Roman numerals (I–III); Reconstructions published in the NBE indicated by "R"
3	Date	Date associated with the completion of the listed version of the composition. Exact dates (e.g. for most cantatas) usually indicate the assumed date of first (public) performance. When the date is followed by an abbreviation in brackets (e.g. JSB for Johann Sebastian Bach) it indicates the date of that person's involvement with the composition as composer, scribe or publisher.
4	Name	Name of the composition: if the composition is known by a German incipit, that German name is preceded by the composition type (e.g. cantata, chorale prelude, motet, ...)
5	Key	Key of the composition
6	Scoring	See scoring table below for the abbreviations used in this column
7	BG	Bach Gesellschaft-Ausgabe (BG edition; BGA): numbers before the colon indicate the volume in that edition. After the colon an Arabic numeral indicates the page number where the score of the composition begins, while a Roman numeral indicates a description of the composition in the Vorwort (Preface) of the volume.
8	NBE	New Bach Edition (German: Neue Bach-Ausgabe, NBA): Roman numerals for the series, followed by a slash, and the volume number in Arabic numerals. A page number, after a colon, refers to the "Score" part of the volume. Without such page number, the composition is only described in the "Critical Commentary" part of the volume. The volumes group Bach's compositions by genre: 1. Cantatas (Vol. 1–34: church cantatas grouped by occasion; Vol. 35–40: secular cantatas; Vol. 41: Varia); 2. Masses, Passions, Oratorios (12 volumes); 3. Motets, Chorales, Lieder (4 volumes); 4. Organ Works (11 volumes); 5. Keyboard and Lute Works (14 volumes); 6. Chamber Music (5 volumes); 7. Orchestral Works (7 volumes); 8. Canons, Musical Offering, Art of Fugue (3 volumes); 9. Addenda (approximately 7 volumes)
9	Additional info	may include: "after" – indicating a model for the composition; "by" – indicating the composer of the composition (if different from Johann Sebastian Bach); "in" – indicating the oldest known source for the composition; "pasticcio" – indicating a composition with parts of different origin; "see" – composition renumbered in a later edition of the BWV; "text" – by text author, or, in source; Provenance of standard texts and tunes, such as Lutheran hymns and their chorale melodies, Latin liturgical texts (e.g. Magnificat) and common tunes (e.g. Folia), are not usually indicated in this column. For an overview of such resources used by Bach, see individual composition articles, and overviews in, e.g., Chorale cantata (Bach)#Bach's chorale cantatas, List of chorale harmonisations by Johann Sebastian Bach#Chorale harmonisations in various collections and List of organ compositions by Johann Sebastian Bach#Chorale Preludes.
10	BD	Bach Digital Work page

Legend for abbreviations in "Scoring" column
Voices (see also SATB)
a	A	b	B	s	S	t	T	v			V	
alto (solo part)	alto (choir part)	bass (solo part)	bass (choir part)	soprano (solo part)	soprano (choir part)	tenor (solo part)	tenor (choir part)	voice (includes parts for unspecified voices or instruments as in some canons)			vocal music for unspecified voice type	
Winds and battery (bold = soloist)
Bas	Bel	Cnt	Fl	Hn	Ob	Oba	Odc	Tai	Tbn	Tdt	Tmp	Tr
bassoon (can be part of Bc, see below)	bell(s) (musical bells)	cornett, cornettino	flute (traverso, flauto dolce, piccolo, flauto basso)	natural horn, corno da caccia, corno da tirarsi, lituo	oboe	oboe d'amore	oboe da caccia	taille	trombone	tromba da tirarsi	timpani	tromba (natural trumpet, clarino trumpet)
Strings and keyboard (bold = soloist)
Bc		Hc	Kb	Lu	Lw	Org	Str	Va	Vc	Vdg	Vl	Vne
basso continuo: Vdg, Hc, Vc, Bas, Org, Vne and/or Lu		harpsichord	keyboard (Hc, Lw, Org or clavichord)	lute, theorbo	Lautenwerck (lute-harpsichord)	organ (/man. = manualiter, without pedals)	strings: Vl I, Vl II and Va	viola(s), viola d'amore, violetta	violoncello, violoncello piccolo	viola da gamba	violin(s), violino piccolo	violone, violone grosso

Background colours
Colour	Meaning
green	extant or clearly documented partial or complete manuscript (copy) by Bach and/or first edition under Bach's supervision
yellow	extant or clearly documented manuscript (copy) or print edition, in whole or in part, by close relative, i.e. brother (J. Christoph), wife (A. M.), son (W. F. / C. P. E. / J. C. F. / J. Christian) or son-in-law (Altnickol)
orange-brown	extant or clearly documented manuscript (copy) by close friend and/or pupil (Kellner, Krebs, Kirnberger, Walther, ...), or distant family member

Chamber music works in Chapter 10 of BWV^{2a}
BWV	^{2a}	Date	Name	Key	Scoring	BG	NBE	Additional info	BD
1001	10.	1720	Sonatas and partitas for solo violin No. 1: Sonata No. 1	G minor	Vl	27^{1}: 3	VI/1: 3 rev 3: 3	→ BWV 1000, 539/2	01179
1002	10.	1720	Partitas and sonatas for solo violin No. 2: Partita No. 1	B minor	Vl	27^{1}: 3	VI/1: 10 rev 3: 10		01180
1003	10.	1720	Sonatas and partitas for solo violin No. 3: Sonata No. 2	A minor	Vl	27^{1}: 3	VI/1: 20 rev 3: 20	→ BWV 964	01181
1004	10.	1720	Partitas and sonatas for solo violin No. 4: Partita No. 2	D minor	Vl	27^{1}: 3	VI/1: 30 rev 3: 30		01182
1005	10.	1720	Sonatas and partitas for solo violin No. 5: Sonata No. 3	C major	Vl	27^{1}: 3	VI/1: 42 rev 3: 42	after "Komm, Heiliger Geist, Herre Gott"; → BWV 968	01183
1006.1	10.	1720	Partitas and sonatas for solo violin No. 6: Partita No. 3	E major	Vl	27^{1}: 3	VI/1: 54 rev 3: 54	→ BWV 1006.2, 29/1 and 120a/4	01184
1007	10.	1720 (AMB)	Suite for cello No. 1	G major	Vc	27^{1}: 59	VI/2: 2		01186
1008	10.	1720 (AMB)	Suite for cello No. 2	D minor	Vc	27^{1}: 59	VI/2: 8		01187
1009	10.	1720 (AMB)	Suite for cello No. 3	C major	Vc	27^{1}: 59	VI/2:14		01188
1010	10.	1720 (AMB)	Suite for cello No. 4	E♭ major	Vc	27^{1}: 59	VI/2: 22		01189
1011	10.	1720 (AMB)	Suite for cello No. 5	C minor	Vc	27^{1}: 59	VI/2: 32	→ BWV 995	01190
1012	10.	1720 (AMB)	Suite for cello No. 6	D major	Vc	27^{1}: 59	VI/2:40		01191
1013	10.	1717–1723?	Partita for flute	A minor	Fl		VI/3: 3		01192
1014	10.	1717–1723?	Sonata for violin and harpsichord No. 1	B minor	Vl Hc	9: 69	VI/1: 83 rev 3: 83		01193
1015	10.	1717–1723?	Sonata for violin and harpsichord No. 2	A major	Vl Hc	9: 84	VI/1: 99 rev 3: 99		01194
1016	10.	1717–1723?	Sonata for violin and harpsichord No. 3	E major	Vl Hc	9: 98	VI/1: 115 rev 3: 115		01195
1017	10.	1717–1723?	Sonata for violin and harpsichord No. 4	C minor	Vl Hc	9: 120	VI/1: 136 rev 3: 136		01196
1018.2	10.	1717–1723?	Sonata for violin and harpsichord No. 5	F minor	Vl Hc	9: 136	VI/1: 153 rev 3: 153	after BWV 1018.1	01197
1018.1	10.	1717–1723?	Adagio, early version of BWV 1018/3	F minor	Vl Hc	9: 250	VI/1: 195 rev 3: 194	→ BWV 1018.2/3	01198
1019.3	10.	after 1729?	Sonata for violin and harpsichord No. 6	G major	Vl Hc	9: 154	VI/1: 172 rev 3: 172	after BWV 1019.2	01200
1019.1	10.	1725	Sonata for violin and harpsichord No. 6, early version 1 (partially lost)	G major	Vl Hc	9: 252	VI/1: 197 rev 3: 196	→ BWV 830/3, /6, 1019.2	01199
1019.2	10.	c. 1730–1731	Sonata for violin and harpsichord No. 6, early version 2	G major	Vl Hc	9: 252	VI/1: 197 rev 3: 218	after BWV 1019.1, 120.1/4; → BWV 1019.3	11577
1021	10.	1732–1733	Sonata for violin and continuo	G major	Vl Bc		VI/1: 65 rev 3: 65	→ BWV 1022, 1038	01202
1023	10.	c.1714–1717?	Sonata for violin and continuo	E minor	Vl Bc	43^{1}: 31	VI/1: 73 rev 3: 73		01204
1025.1	10.	after 1739?	Suite for violin and keyboard	A major	Vl Kb	9: 43	VI/5: 67	after Weiss; → BWV 1025.2	11578
1025.2	10.	c. 1746–1747?	Suite for violin and keyboard (incomplete)	A major	Vl Kb	9: 43	VI/5: 97	after BWV 1025.1	01206
1026	10.	c.1714–1717	Fugue for violin and continuo	G minor	Vl Bc	43^{1}: 39	VI/5: 59		01207
1027	10.	c.1742	Sonata for gamba and harpsichord No. 1	G major	Gam Hc	9: 175	VI/4: 3	after BWV 1039; → 1027/1a /2a /4a	01208
1028	10.		Sonata for gamba and harpsichord No. 2	D major	Gam Hc	9: 175	VI/4: 21		01210
1029	10.		Sonata for gamba and harpsichord No. 3	G minor	Gam Hc	9: 175	VI/4: 36	→ BWV 545b	01211
1030.2	10.	1736–1737	Sonata for flute and harpsichord	B minor	Fl Hc	9: 3	VI/3: 33	after BWV 1030.1	11579
1030.1	10.	1717–1736	Sonata for unknown instrument and harpsichord	G minor	v Hc		VI/3: 89	→ BWV 1030.2	01212
1032	10.	1736–1737	Sonata for flute and harpsichord (/1 incomplete)	A major	Fl Hc	9: 32, 245	VI/3: 54	→ BWV 525a	01214
1034	10.	after 1723	Sonata for flute and continuo	E minor	Fl Bc	43^{1}: 9	VI/3: 11		01216
1035	10.	1740s	Sonata for flute and continuo	E major	Fl Bc	43^{1}: 21	VI/3: 23		01217
1039	10.	1708–1726	Sonata	G major	2Fl Bc	9: 260	VI/3: 71	→ BWV 1027	01221
