= Flute sonata =

A flute sonata is a sonata usually for flute and piano, though occasionally other accompanying instruments may be used. Flute sonatas in the Baroque period were very often accompanied in the form of basso continuo.

== List of flute sonatas ==
- George Antheil
  - Sonata for flute and piano (1951)
- Malcolm Arnold
  - Sonata for flute and piano, Op.121 (1977)
- Claude Arrieu
  - Sonatina for flute and piano (1944)
- Carl Philipp Emanuel Bach
  - Sonata in A minor for solo flute (H. (Helm) 562/Wq. (Wotquenne) 132) (1747)
  - 14 sonatas for flute and continuo
  - Sonata in G minor for flute and harpsichord, BWV 1020
  - Sonata in E♭ major for flute and harpsichord, BWV 1031
  - Sonata in C major for flute and basso continuo, BWV 1033
- Johann Christian Bach
  - Sonatas for keyboard with flute or violin, Op. 16
- Johann Sebastian Bach
  - Sonata in B minor for flute and harpsichord, BWV 1030
  - Sonata in A major for flute and harpsichord, BWV 1032
  - Sonata in E minor for flute and basso continuo, BWV 1034
  - Sonata in E major for flute and basso continuo, BWV 1035
- Nicolas Bacri
  - Spring Sonata for flute and piano, Op. 147 (2018)
- Arnold Bax
  - Sonata for flute and harp (1928)
- Lennox Berkeley
  - Sonata for flute and piano (1978)
- Ludwig van Beethoven (attributed)
  - Flute Sonata in B♭ major, Anh. 4
- Mélanie Bonis
  - Flute Sonata in C♯ minor, Op. 64 (1904)
- Pierre Boulez
  - Sonatina for flute and piano (1946) (1 serial movement)
- York Bowen
  - Flute Sonata, Op. 120 (1946)
- Robert J. Bradshaw
  - Sonata No. 2 In My Collection for flute and piano
- Jean Coulthard
  - Lyric Sonatina for flute and piano (1971)
- Edison Denisov
  - Sonata for flute and piano (1960)
  - Sonata for flute and guitar (1977)
  - Sonata for flute solo (1982)
  - Sonata for flute and harp (1983)
- Pierre Max Dubois
  - Sonata for flute and piano
- Henri Dutilleux
  - Sonatine for Flute and Piano (1943)
- Jindřich Feld
  - Sonata for flute and piano (1957)
- César Franck
  - Sonata for Violin and Piano in A major (transcribed for flute) (1886)
- Frederick the Great
  - 121 sonatas for flute and continuo
- Glenn Gould
  - Sonata for Flute and Piano (1950). (This work is an arrangement of Gould's Sonata for Bassoon and Piano).
- George Frideric Handel
  - Sonata for flute and basso continuo in E minor, HWV 359b
  - Sonata for flute and basso continuo in G major, HWV 363b
  - Sonata for flute and basso continuo in B minor, HWV 367b
  - Sonata for flute and basso continuo in A minor, HWV 374, Halle sonata No. 1 (authenticity uncertain)
  - Sonata for flute and basso continuo in E minor, HWV 375, Halle sonata No. 2 (authenticity uncertain)
  - Sonata for flute and basso continuo in B minor, HWV 376, Halle sonata No. 3 (authenticity uncertain)
  - Sonata for flute and basso continuo in D major, HWV 378
  - Sonata for flute and basso continuo in E minor, HWV 379
- Hans Werner Henze
  - Sonatina for flute and piano (1947)
- Paul Hindemith
  - Sonata for flute and piano (1936)
- Bertold Hummel
  - Sonatina for flute and piano, Op. 107a (2001)
- Johann Nepomuk Hummel
  - Sonata in D, Op. 50 (c1810–14)
  - Sonata in A, Op. 64 (c1814–15)
- Philipp Jarnach
  - Sonatina for flute and piano, Op. 12 (1919)
- Sándor Jemnitz
  - Sonata for flute and piano, Op. 27 (1930–31)
- Paul Juon
  - Sonata for flute and piano in F, Op. 78 (1924)
- Sigfrid Karg-Elert
  - Sonata for flute and piano in B♭, Op. 121 (1918)
  - Sonata Appassionata for flute solo in F♯, Op. 140 (1917)
- Charles Koechlin
  - Sonata for flute and piano, Op. 52 (1911–13)
  - Sonata for 2 flutes, Op. 75 (1918–20)
  - Three sonatines for solo flute, Op. 184 (1942)
- Rachel Laurin
  - Sonata for flute and piano, Op. 29 (1995)
- Jean-Marie Leclair
  - Sonata for flute and harpsichord No.1 in B major, Book 1, No.2
  - Sonata for flute and harpsichord No.2 in E minor, Book 1, No.6
  - Sonata for flute and harpsichord No.3 in E minor, Book 2, No. 1
  - Sonata for flute and harpsichord No.4 in C major, Book 2, No. 3
  - Sonata for flute and harpsichord No.5 in G major, Book 2, No. 5
  - Sonata for flute and harpsichord No.6 in B minor, Book 2, No. 11
  - Sonata for flute and harpsichord No.7 in E minor, Book 4, No. 2
  - Sonata for flute and harpsichord No.8 in G major, Book 4, No. 7
- Dieter Lehnhoff
  - Sonata Porteña for flute and piano, Op. 35 (2013)
- Bohuslav Martinů
  - Sonata for flute and piano, Halbreich 306 (1945)
- Peter Mieg
  - Sonata for flute and piano (1963)
- Darius Milhaud
  - Sonatina for flute and piano, Op. 76 (1922)
- Ignaz Moscheles
  - Sonata for flute and piano in A, Op. 44 (1819)
  - Sonata for flute and piano in G, Op. 79 (1828)
- Wolfgang Amadeus Mozart
  - Sonata in B♭ for keyboard with flute (or violin) and cello, K. 10
  - Sonata in G for keyboard with flute (or violin) and cello, K. 11
  - Sonata in A for keyboard with flute (or violin) and cello, K. 12
  - Sonata in F for keyboard with flute (or violin) and cello, K. 13
  - Sonata in C for keyboard with flute (or violin) and cello, K. 14
  - Sonata in B♭ for keyboard with flute (or violin) and cello, K. 15
- Jules Mouquet
  - La Flûte de Pan, Sonata, Op. 15
- Robert Muczynski
  - Sonata for flute and piano, Op. 14 (1961)
- Gabriel Pierné
  - Sonata for flute and piano, Op. 36 (1900)
- Willem Pijper
  - Sonata for flute and piano (1925)
- Walter Piston
  - Sonata for flute and piano (1930)
- Francis Poulenc
  - Flute Sonata, Schmidt 164 (1956–7)
- Sergei Prokofiev
  - Flute Sonata in D, Op. 94 (1943)
- Einojuhani Rautavaara
  - Sonata for flute and guitar (1975)
- Carl Reinecke
  - Undine, Flute Sonata, Op. 167 (1882)
- Ferdinand Ries
  - Flute Sonata in G major, Op. 48 (pub. 1815)
  - Divertimento for Piano and Flute in G major, Op.62 (1815, pub. 1819)
  - Flute Sonata in C major, Op. 76, No. 1 (1816, pub. ca 1817/18)
  - Flute Sonata in G major, Op. 76, No. 2 (1817, pub. ca 1817/18)
  - Flute Sonata in G major, Op. 87 (pub. 1819)
  - Flute Sonata in E♭ major, Op. 169 Sonate sentimentale (1814, pub. 1834)
- Nino Rota
  - Sonata for flute and harp (1937)
- R. Murray Schafer
  - Sonatina for flute and harpsichord (or piano) (1976)
- Erwin Schulhoff
  - Sonata for flute and piano (1927)
- Lachlan Skipworth
  - Flute Sonata (2020)
- Leo Smit
  - Sonata for flute and piano (1939–43)
- Otar Taktakishvili
  - Sonata for flute and piano (1968)
- Grace Williams
  - Sonatina for flute and piano (1931)

== See also ==
- Flute concerto
- Flute repertory
