= List of compositions for flute =

This is a list of notable compositions for the flute (particularly the Western concert flute).

== Flute alone ==
- C. P. E. Bach:
  - Sonata in A minor (1763)
- J.S. Bach:
  - Partita in A minor for solo flute (c. 1718)
- Luciano Berio:
  - Sequenza I (1958)
- Ludwig van Beethoven
  - Allegro and Minuet for two flutes (1792)
- Claude Debussy:
  - Syrinx (1913)
- Arthur Honegger:
  - Danse de la chèvre (1921)
- Felix Mendelssohn:
  - The Shepherd’s Song in G minor for solo flute, R 24
- Robert Muczynski:
  - Three Preludes, Op. 18 (1962)
- Karlheinz Stockhausen:
  - Amour (1981)
  - Harmonien (2006)
- Tōru Takemitsu
  - Voice (1971)
- Georg Philipp Telemann:
  - 12 Fantasias for Solo Flute (1733)
- Edgard Varèse:
  - Density 21.5 (1936)

== Flute and piano ==
This section does not include flute sonatas which are listed at their respective page.

- Ludwig van Beethoven:
  - Six National Airs with Variations for flute (or violin) and piano in G major, Op. 105 (1818–19)
  - Ten National Airs with Variations for flute (or violin) and piano in A minor, Op. 107 (1818–19)
- Frédéric Chopin (attributed):
  - Variations in E major on "Non più mesta" from Rossini's La Cenerentola for flute and piano, B. 9, KK. Anh. Ia/5 (1829 or after)
- Aaron Copland:
  - Duo for flute and piano (1971)
- Gabriel Fauré:
  - Fantaisie, Op. 79
- André Jolivet:
  - Chant de Linos for flute and piano (1944)
- Olivier Messiaen:
  - Le merle noir (1952)
- Camille Saint-Saëns:
  - Romance, Op. 37 (1871)

== Flute and other instruments ==
- Ludwig van Beethoven:
  - Serenade for flute, violin and viola in D major, Op. 25
  - Trio for piano, flute, and bassoon in G major, WoO 37
- Pierre Boulez:
  - …explosante-fixe…, various configurations with flute and other instruments (1971–72, 1973–74, 1985, 1991–93)
  - Le marteau sans maître for contralto voice, alto flute, viola, guitar, xylorimba, vibraphone, and percussion
- Carlos Chávez:
  - Soli II for flute, oboe, clarinet, bassoon, and horn
  - Xochipilli, for piccolo, flute, E-flat clarinet, trombone, and six percussionists
- Claude Debussy:
  - Sonata for flute, viola and harp
- André Jolivet:
  - Pastorales de Noël, for flute, bassoon, and harp
- Camille Saint-Saëns:
  - Caprice sur des airs danois et russes, for flute, oboe, clarinet and piano
- Karlheinz Stockhausen:
  - Adieu, for flute, oboe, clarinet, bassoon, and horn
  - Zeitmaße, for flute, oboe, cor anglais, clarinet, and bassoon
- Georg Philipp Telemann:
  - Paris quartets (12) for flute, violin, viola da gamba or cello, and continuo (1730 and 1738)
- Edgard Varèse:
  - Octandre for flute (doubling piccolo), oboe, clarinet, horn, bassoon, trumpet, trombone, and double bass
- Heitor Villa-Lobos:
  - Bachianas Brasileiras No. 6 for flute and bassoon
  - Chôros No. 2 for flute and clarinet
  - Chôros No. 7 for flute, oboe, clarinet, alto saxophone, bassoon, violin and cello with tam-tam ad lib
  - Quinteto (em forma de chôros) for flute, oboe, cor anglais, clarinet and bassoon
- Carl Maria von Weber:
  - Trio for Piano, Flute and Cello in G minor, Op. 63, J. 259 (1818-19)

== Flute and orchestra ==
This section does not include flute concertos which are listed at their respective page.

- J. S. Bach:
  - Suite No. 2 for flute, strings and basso continuo in B minor, BWV 1067 (1738-39)
- Wolfgang Amadeus Mozart:
  - Andante in C major for Flute and Orchestra, K. 315 (1778)
- Carl Maria von Weber:
  - Romanza siciliana for flute and orchestra in G minor, J. 47 (1805)
- Camille Saint-Saëns:
  - Romance for flute and orchestra in D-flat major, Op. 37 (1871)
  - Odelette for flute and orchestra in D major, Op. 162 (1920)

== See also ==
- Flute ensemble
