= Sonata in G major for two flutes and basso continuo, BWV 1039 =

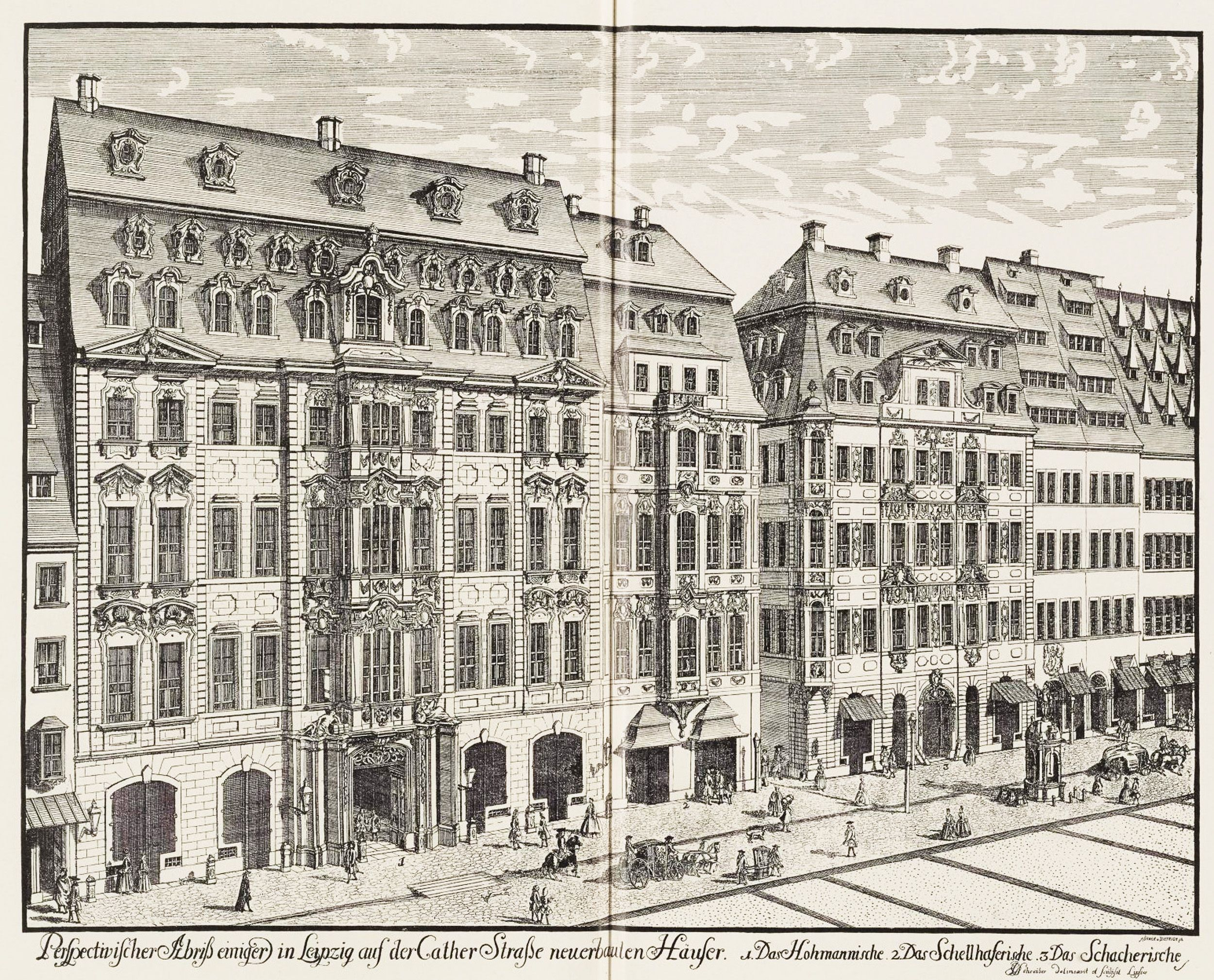
Johann Georg Schreiber, 1720: Engraving of Katherinenstrasse in Leipzig. In the centre is Café Zimmermann, where the Collegium Musicum held weekly chamber music concerts

The Sonata in G major for two flutes and basso continuo, BWV 1039, is a trio sonata by Johann Sebastian Bach. It is a version, for a different instrumentation, of the Gamba Sonata, BWV 1027. The first, second and fourth movement of these sonatas also exist as a trio sonata for organ.

== Historical context ==
This sonata, scored for two transverse flutes and continuo, is one of the few trio sonatas that can genuinely be attributed to Bach. Although traditionally thought to have been composed during Bach's period in Weimar or Cöthen, Bach scholars have revised that dating based on an analysis of the extant manuscripts and on stylistic considerations. According to Wolff (1994), the trio sonata was composed between 1736 and 1741 in Leipzig, where, since 1729, Bach had been director of the Collegium Musicum, a chamber music society performing weekly at the Café Zimmermann. The version for viola da gamba and harpsichord, BWV 1027, as well as the other two sonatas for this ensemble, are dated by Laurence Dreyfus, Christoph Wolff and others to the same period.

== Movements ==
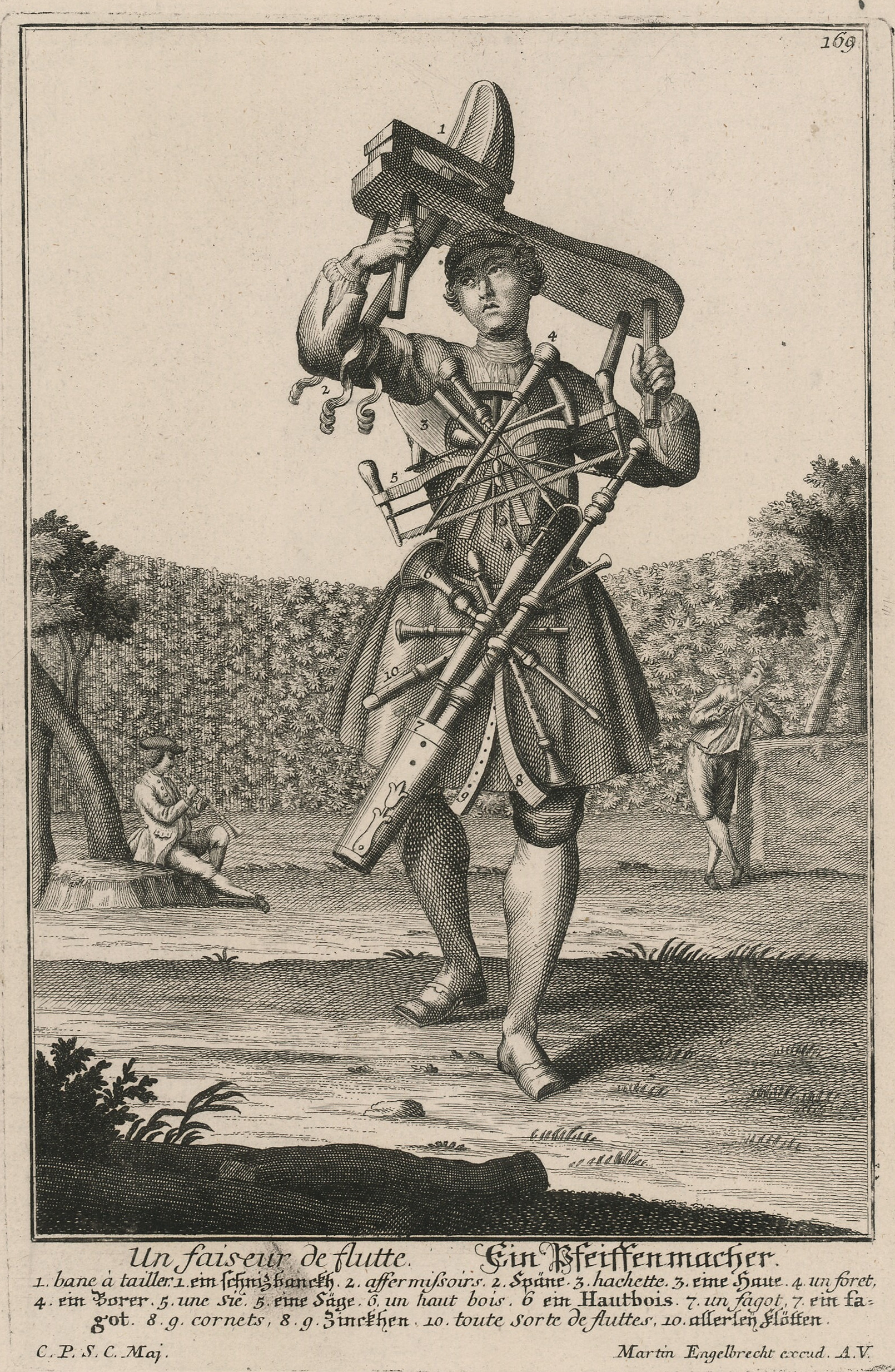
An itinerant flute maker, engraving by Michael Rössler, mid-18th century, Library of Congress

BWV 1039 has four movements:

1. Adagio
2. Allegro ma non presto
3. Adagio e piano
4. Presto

== Trio sonata for organ ==
Apart from the sonata for viola da gamba and the trio sonata for two flutes and continuo, there is a third version of the sonata for organ—the trio sonata in G major in three movements (BWV 1027a and BWV 1039a). The first two movements are organ transcriptions of the first two movements of BWV 1039; while its last movement is a transcription of the fourth movement of BWV 1027. According to the Bach scholar Russell Stinson, the transcription for organ was not made by Bach, but probably by Johann Peter Kellner. Pieter Dirksen has surmised that although the Gamba sonata BWV 1027 corresponds to one of Bach's own autograph manuscript from 1740, the other sources, one of them with Bach's son Johann Gottfried Bernhard as scribe, probably date from 1735 or later. Stinson also thinks it possible that the organ arrangement could originate from a lost trio sonata in G major for two violins and basso continuo.

== Selected recordings ==
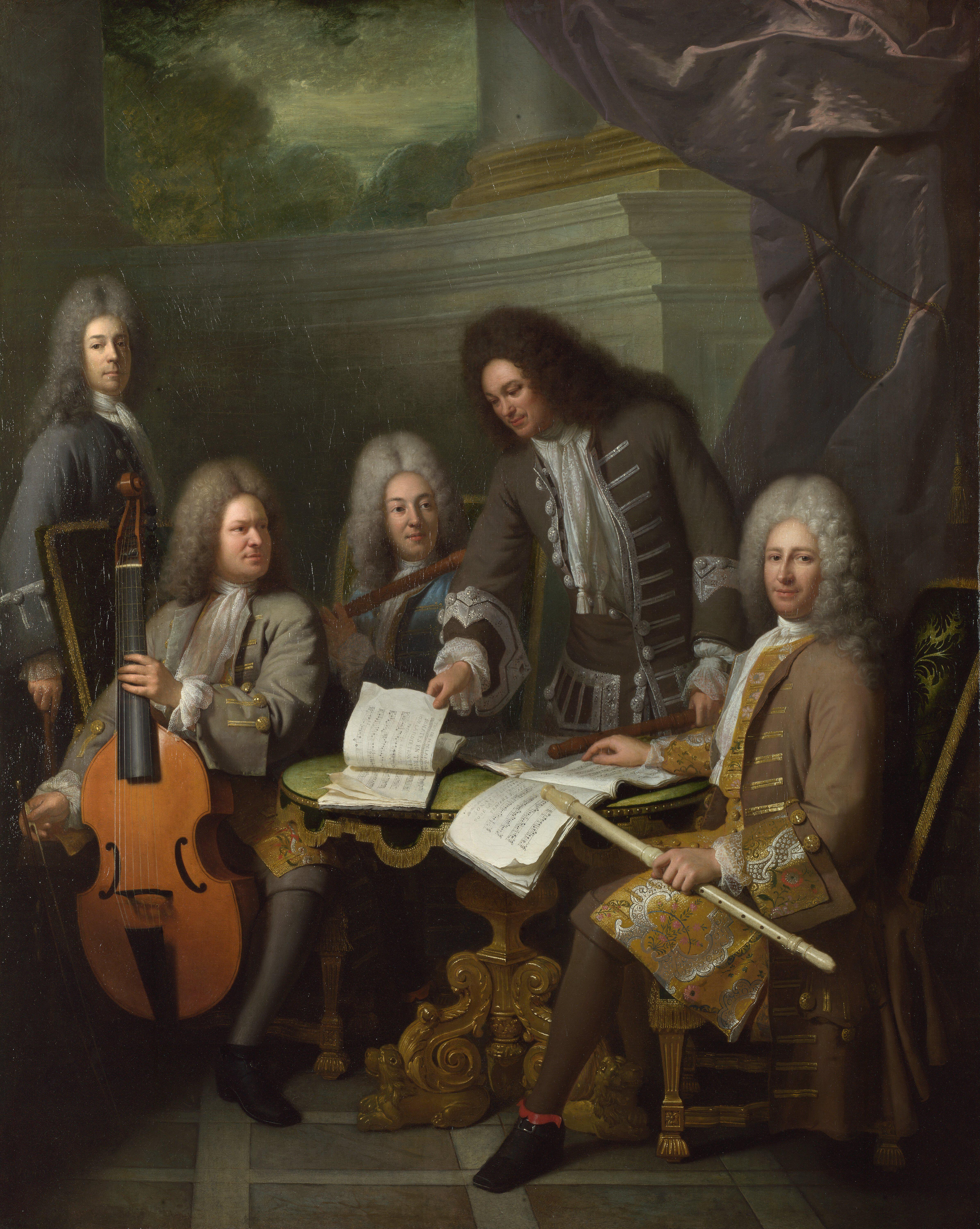
The flautist Michel de la Barre, standing in a black wig, presides on a council with the viol player Marin Marais and other musicians, 1707: André Bouys, National Gallery

=== Two transverse flutes ===
- Bart Kuijken, Marc Hantai (transverse flutes), Sigiswald Kuijken (viola da gamba), Gustav Leonhardt (harpsichord), Deutsche Harmonia Mundi
- James Galway, Jeanne Galway (transverse flutes), Sarah Cunningham (viola da gamba), Phillip Moll (harpsichord), RCA
- Alain Marion, Jean-Pierre Rampal (transverse flutes), Jordi Savall (viol), Robert Veyron-Lacroix (harpsichord), Erato
- Frans Brüggen, Leopold Stastny (transverse flutes), Nikolaus Harnoncourt (cello), Herbert Tachezi (harpsichord), Teldec
- Ashley Solomon, Andrew Crawford (transverse flutes), Daniel Yeadon (viola da gamba), Neal Peres da Coasta (harpsichord): Florilegium, Channel Productions
- Petri Alanko, Hanna Juutilainen (transverse flutes), Jukka Rautasalo (cello), Anssi Mattila (harpsichord), Naxos Records
- Lisa Beznosiuk, Stephen Preston (transverse flutes), Charles Medlam (cello), John Toll (harpsichord): London Baroque, Harmonia Mundi
- Maxence Larrieu, Kristian Nyquist (transverse flutes), Jean-Michel Tanguy (harpsichord), Pavane Records.
- Peter-Lukas Graf, Gaby Pas-Van Riet (transverse flutes), Bruno Canino (harpsichord), Claves.
- Lisa Beznosiuk, Rachel Brown (transverse flutes), Richard Tunnicliffe (cello), Paul Nicholson (harpsichord/virginals), Hyperion Records.
- Emmanuel Pahud, Silvia Careddu (transverse flutes), Jonathan Manson (viola da gamba), Trevor Pinnock (harpsichord), Warner Classics
- Philippe Suzanne, Wilbert Hazelzet (transverse flutes), Jaap Ter Linden (cello), Henk Bouman (harpsichord): Musica Antiqua Köln, Archiv Produktion

=== Organ ===
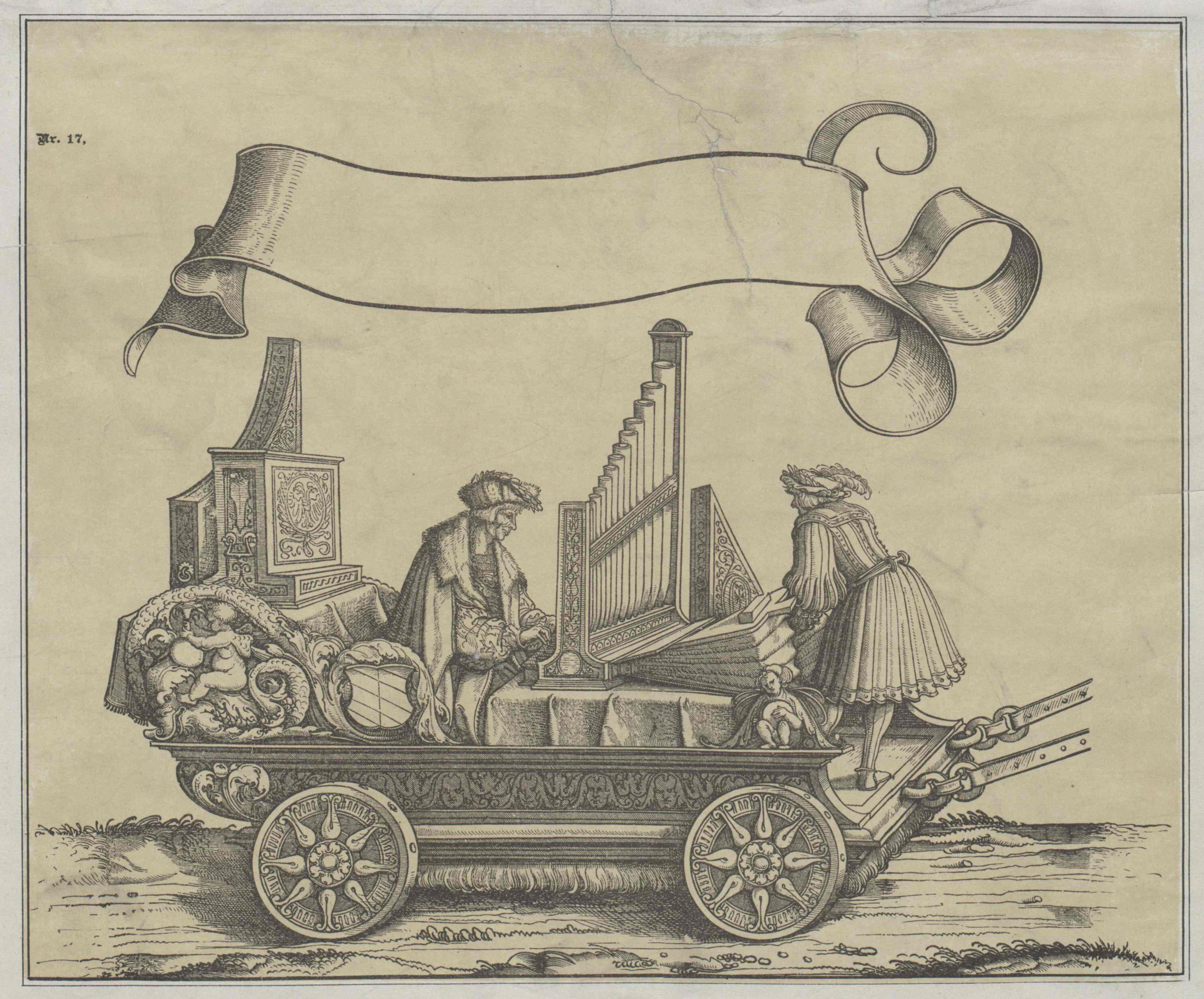
Paul Hofhaimer playing a positive organ on a cart

- Kevin Bowyer (organ), four movements, Vol. 8, Complete Organ Works of J. S. Bach, Nimbus Records
- Günther Fetz, Rudolf Scheidegger (chamber organs), Edition Clarino

=== Other instruments ===
- Elisabeth Ingenhousz (violin), Abigail Graham (oboe), Barbara Kernig (cello) Miwako Hannya (harpsichord): Ensemble Il Quadrifoglio, Brilliant Classics
- James Galway (transverse flute), Kyung-Wha Chung (violin), Moray Welsh (cello), Phillip Moll (harpsichord), RCA
- Ashley Solomon (transverse flute), Bojan Čičić (violin), Reiko Ichise (viola da gamba), Terence Charlston (harpsichord); Florilegium, Channel Productions
- Maria Tecla Andreotti (transverse flute), Christophe Coin (viola da gamba), Sergio Azzolini (bassoon), Jan Willem Jansen (harpsichord), Laborie
- Marc Hantaï (transverse flute), Jérôme Hantaï (viola da gamba), Ageet Zweistra (cello), Pierre Hantaï (harpsichord), Veritas
- Walter van Hauwe, Lorenzo Cavasanti (alto flutes), Caroline Boersma (cello), Sergio Ciomei (positive organ): Tripla Concordia, Arcana
- Ramon Ortega Quero, Tamar Inbar (oboes), Luise Buchberger (cello), Peter Kofler (harpsichord), Berlin Classics
