= Flute Sonata in E major, BWV 1035 =

1740s musical work by J.S. Bach

Flute Sonata in E major
- BWV 1035
- by J. S. Bach
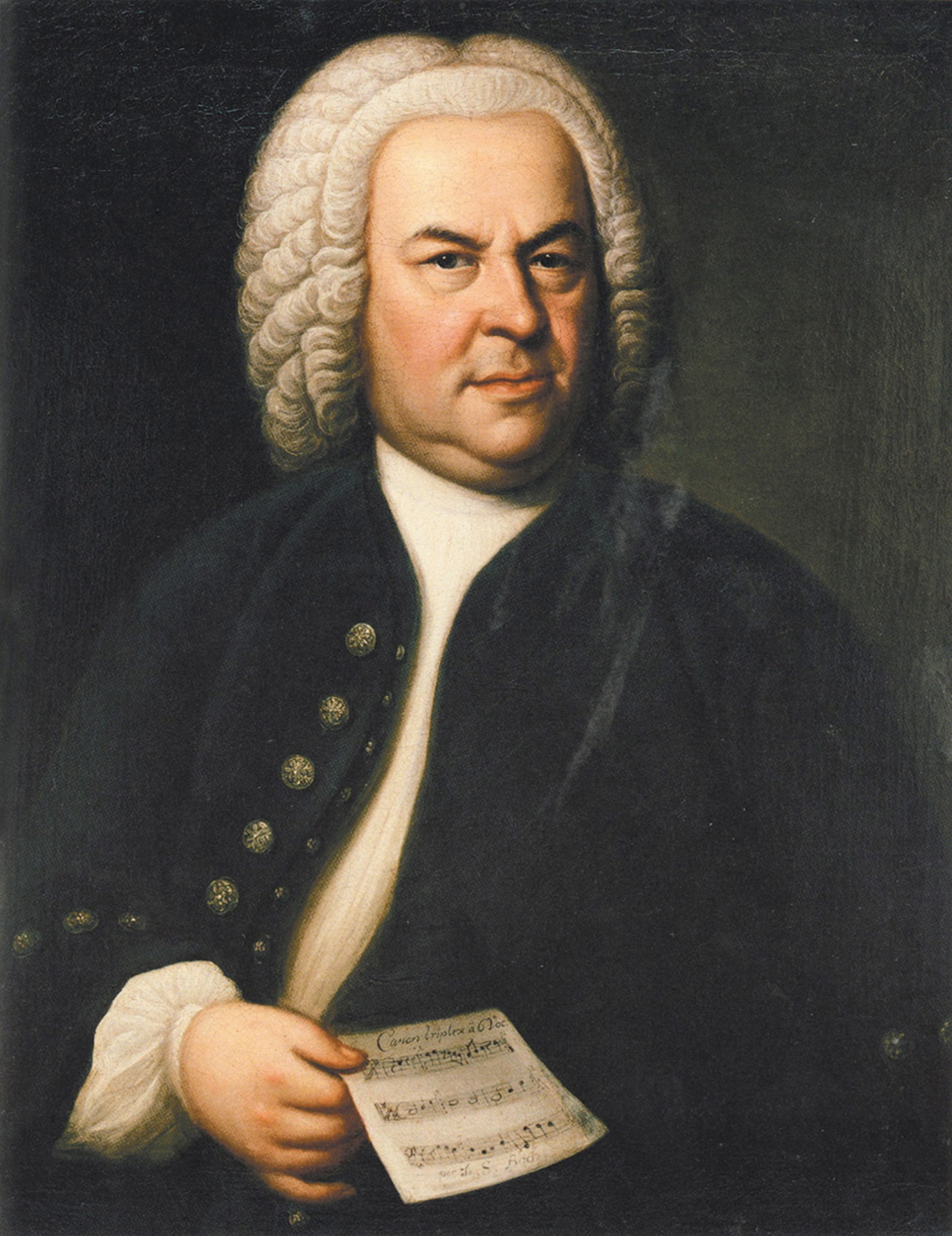
- Bach in 1746; 1748 portrait by Elias Gottlob Haussmann
- Composed: After 1741
- Dedication: Michael Gabriel Fredersdorf
- Movements: 4
- Scoring: Flute and continuo

The Sonata in E major for flute and basso continuo, BWV 1035, is a sonata for transverse flute and figured bass composed by J. S. Bach in the 1740s. It was written as the result of a visit in 1741 to the court of Frederick the Great in Potsdam, where Bach's son Carl Philipp Emanuel had been appointed principal harpsichordist to the king the previous year. It was dedicated to Michael Gabriel Fredersdorf, the king's valet and private secretary, who, like the king, was an amateur flautist.

== Origins and musical structure ==
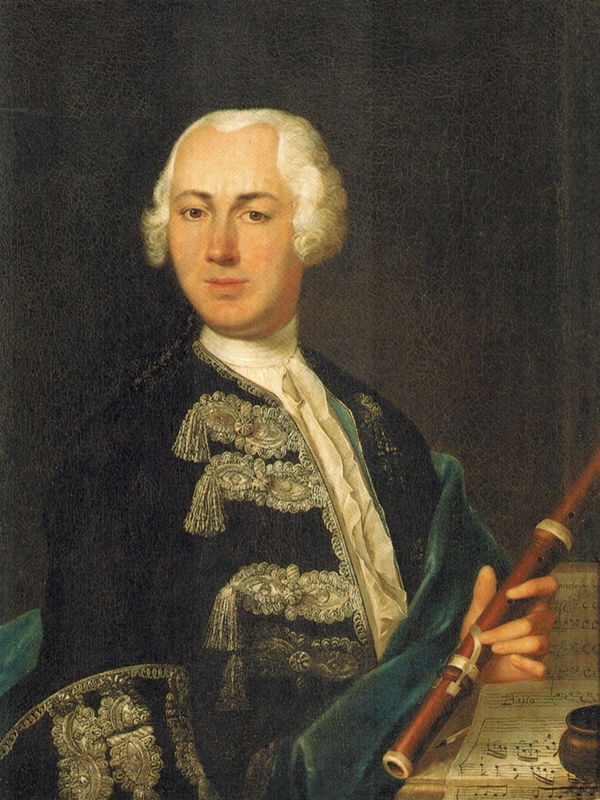
Joachim Quantz, 1735

The surviving 19th-century sources for the sonata carry dedications to Frederick the Great's private secretary, Michael Gabriel Fredersdorf: one of the earliest hand copies of BWV 1035 is annotated "after the autograph by the composer, which was written anno 17-, when he was at Potsdam, for privy chamberlain Fredersdorf." Fredersdorf had been taught to play the flute by his father, a Stadtpfeifer in Frankfurt. He acted as an intermediary with the Dresden flautist-composer Joachim Quantz, who not only composed for Frederick but also gave him lessons and supplied him with instruments. When Frederick became king in 1740, he appointed Bach's son, Carl Philipp Emanuel, as the principal court harpsichordist. One and a half years later in December 1741, Quantz also joined the court where he served as composer and flute teacher until the end of his career.

Before that, in the summer of 1741, Bach made his first visit to Berlin, staying near the royal palace on Unter den Linden with his friend Georg Ernst Stahl, a court doctor. As his correspondence with his family in Leipzig shows, on this first visit Bach did not have an official audience with the king, but—in view of the dedication—must have conferred with Fredersdorf.

=== Movements ===
The sonata has four movements:

1. Adagio ma non tanto,
2. Allegro, 2/4
3. Siciliano, 6/8 in C♯ minor
4. Allegro assai, 3/4

The opening movement, Adagio ma non tanto, contains many expressive and elaborate baroque ornaments including the king's favourite "tierces ornées"—intermediate notes added to a falling third, creating a sighing Affekt. As Oleskiewicz (1999, p. 95) comments, this was probably the only time Bach used ornamentation of this kind.

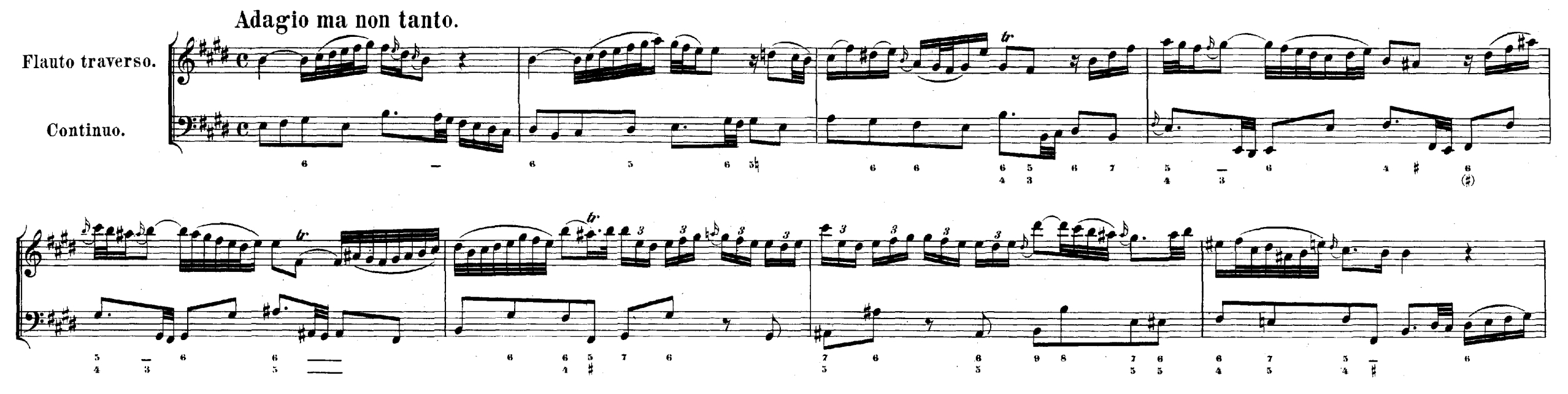

The alternation of the semidemiquaver melismas with the semiquaver triplet passages along with the passages of coupled semiquaver figures are also typical of Bach's Leipzig style.

Likewise, the dancelike Allegro in a lively 2/4 time signature follows the pattern of his Leipzig works, an acquiescence to the galant style so popular at the time.

In the slow Siciliano, the opening theme of the flute is taken up in canon a bar later in the bass line. The movement itself is in the key of C♯ minor, but modulates through many keys before returning to the original key.

The last Allegro assai also has galant elements, with its binary form—like the second and third movements—and its quirky dancelike rhythms. Both fast movements contain trills and brilliant semiquaver passagework.

Eppstein (1972, pp. 15, 23) has suggested that BWV 1035 can be considered as a sonata da camera, with the first movement playing the role of a prelude and the subsequent binary movements corresponding to dances. He has proposed that the fast movements correspond to specific dance forms: the second movement to a rigaudon, a French dance appearing for example in the fourth of François Couperin's Concerts Royaux (1722); and the fourth movement to a spritely polonaise. The third slow movement, as indicated in the score, is a siciliano.

== Arrangements and transcriptions ==
- Transcription in F major for alto recorder and harpsichord, published by Schott, Heinrichshofen's Verlag, Universal and Dowani International (with a practice CD).
- Transcription in C major for oboe and harpsichord by Gonzalo X. Ruiz, 2005.
- Arrangement for flute and guitar by Michael Langer, Doblinger, 1997.

== Selected recordings ==
Sonata for Flute and Harpsichord in E major, BWV 1035
I. Adagio ma non tanto

II. Allegro

III. Siciliano

IV. Allegro assai
Performed by Alex Murray (transverse flute) and Martha Goldstein (harpsichord)

The sonata was written for transverse flute and continuo, but has been arranged for other instruments (see above). The sonata, and its transposed version in F major for alto recorder, are part of the standard examination repertoire for the ABRSM and other national examining boards.

Figured bass on harpsichord

- Jean-Pierre Rampal and Robert Veyron-Lacroix (harpsichord) Erato, 1973 (there are many recordings from the period 1950–1981).
- Elaine Shaffer, Ambrose Gauntlett (viola da gamba), George Malcolm (harpsichord), Angel
- Maxence Larrieu, Rafael Puyana (harpsichord), Wieland Kuijken (viola da gamba), Philips, 1967.
- Peter-Lukas Graf, Manfred Sax (bassoon), Jörg Ewald Dähler (harpsichord), Claves, 1968.
- Peter-Lukas Graf, Johannes Koch (viola da gamba) and Henriette Barbe (harpsichord), Jecklin, 1984.
- Frans Brüggen, Anner Bylsma (cello), Gustav Leonhardt (harpsichord), Pro-Arte, 1986.
- Marc Beaucoudray, William Christie (harpsichord), Harmonia Mundi, 1982.
- Aurèle Nicolet, Mari Fujiwara (harpsichord), Denon, 1992.
- Ashley Solomon, Terence Charlston (harpsichord), Channel Classics, 2000.
- Barthold Kuijken, Ewald Demeyere (harpsichord), Accent, 2003.
- Emmanuel Pahud, Trevor Pinnock (harpsichord), Warner Classics, 2008.
- James Galway, Sarah Cunningham (viola da gamba), Philip Moll (harpsichord), Sony Classical, 2009.
- Rachel Brown, Katherine Sharman (cello), Laurence Cummings (harpsichord), Uppernote, 2016.

Figured bass on fortepiano

- Christopher Krueger, Laura Jeppesen (viola da gamba), John Gibbons (fortepiano), Centaur Records, 1997.
- Susan Rotholz, Kenneth Cooper (fortepiano), Bridge Records, 2002.

Figured bass on lute

- Lisa Beznosiuk, Richard Tunnicliffe (cello) and Elizabeth Kenny (lute), Hyperion, 2002.

Piano accompaniment

- Georges Laurent, Harry Cumpson (piano), Columbia [between 1933 and 1936, one of the earliest recordings of the work]
- Peter-Lukas Graf, Aglaia Graf (piano), Claves, 2005.
- Andrea Oliva, Angela Hewitt (piano) Hyperion, 2013.

Guitar accompaniment

- Gary Schocker, Jason Vieaux (guitar), Azica, 2004.
- Marina Piccinini, João Luiz & Douglas Lora (guitars), Avie, 2010.

Transcriptions

- Marion Verbruggen (alto recorder), Christina Mahler (cello), John Gibbons (harpsichord), Titanic, 1988.
- Michala Petri (alto recorder), Keith Jarrett (harpsichord), RCA, 1992.
- Hugo Reyne (alto recorder), Emmanuelle Guiges (viola da gamba), Pierre Hantaï (harpsichord), Mirare, 2009.
- Gonzalo X. Ruiz (baroque oboe), Joanna Blendulf (cello), Katherine Shao (harpsichord), J. S. Bach, Transcriptions for Baroque Oboe, La Riche & Co, 2005.

Arrangements

- Eric Ruske (horn), Pedja Muzijevic (piano), The Classic Horn – World Premiere Transcriptions, Albany Records, 2003
- Eugene Rousseau (saxophone), Hans Graf (piano), Saxophone Colors, Delos Records, 1992
