= Three Preludes =

Three Preludes may refer to:

- Three Preludes (Gershwin)
- Three Preludes (Muczynski)
- Three Preludes (ballet), a 1992 ballet by Mark Morris
