= Violin Sonatas, K. 10–15 (Mozart) =

1764 sonatas by W. A. Mozart

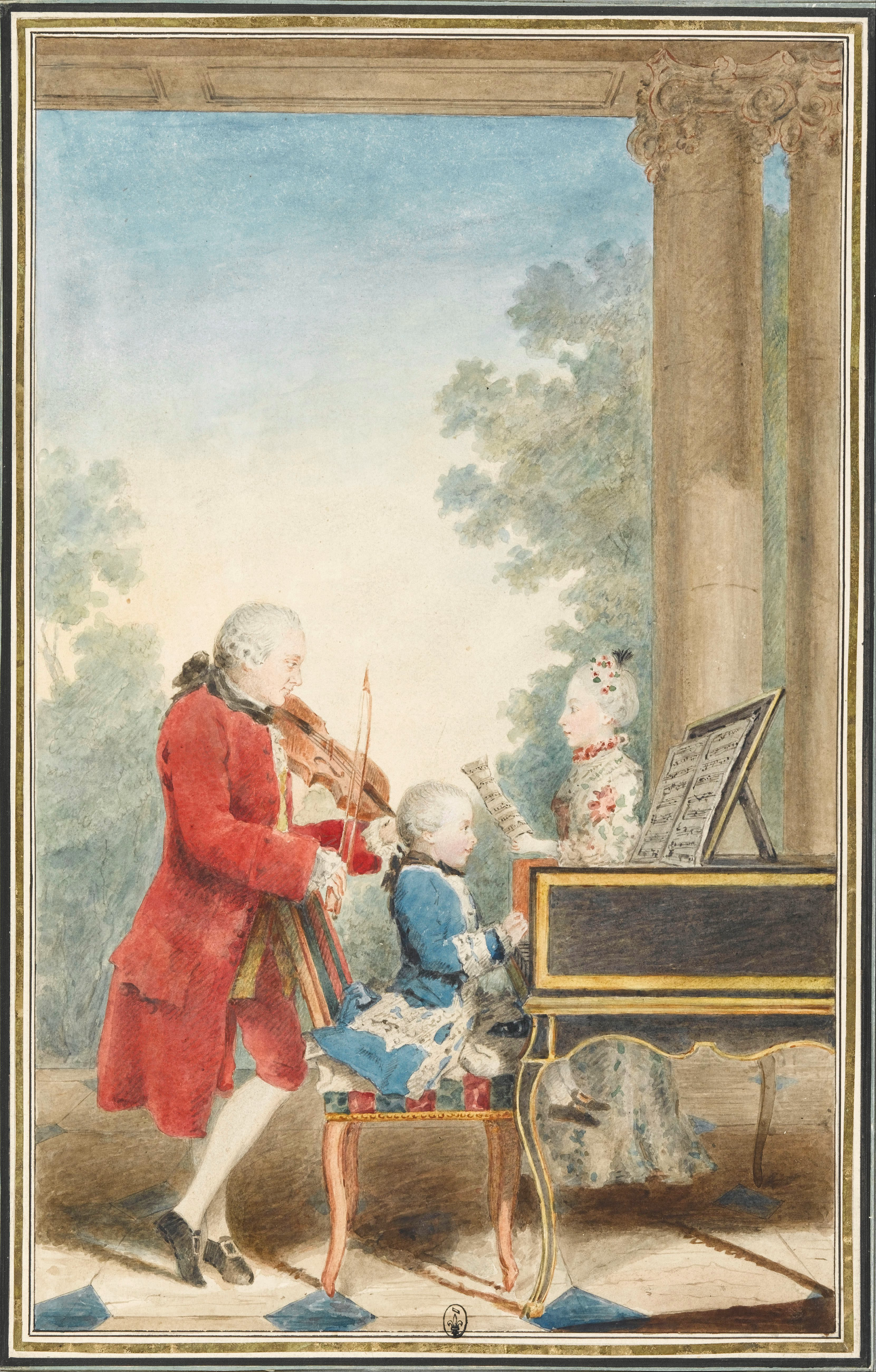
Carmontelle's 1763–64 Mozart family portrait

Wolfgang Amadeus Mozart composed six sonatas for keyboard with accompaniment of violin (or flute) and cello, K. 10–15, in late 1764 in London during the Mozart family's grand tour of Europe. Britain's Queen Charlotte commissioned them on 25 October, and the works were dedicated to her on 18 January 1765. They were published as Mozart's "Opus III" by his father Leopold at 20 Frith Street, Soho, London, where the Mozarts lived from September 1764 until after May 1765.

== History ==
The keyboard part was originally written for a harpsichord. Unlike Mozart's other works for violin and keyboard, the first edition was printed with a separate ad libitum cello part for all six sonatas. The part mostly doubles the principal notes in the left hand part of the keyboard in the manner of Haydn's early piano trios (e.g. Trio No. 5 in G minor, Hob. XV:1), or a set of similarly scored sonatas (Op. 2, WB 43–48) by Queen Charlotte's music teacher Johann Christian Bach. Bach befriended the young Mozart and became an important influence on the younger composer's evolving style.

The Neue Mozart-Ausgabe therefore includes the works with the piano trios, unlike the earlier Alte Mozart-Ausgabe and the various editions of the Köchel catalogue which list them as violin sonatas (or flute sonatas). The editors defend this decision on two grounds. First, one of the two editions of the first publication of the trios specifically mentions the cello part, which is in no way a simple doubling of the bass line of the keyboard. And second, because in their opinion "The six sonatas mark the first step on the way from the ad libitum accompanied keyboard sonata to the later classical piano trio."

They also point out that the treble part is unsuitable for the flute: '"The upper part in its authentic form, however, is clearly written for violin (double-stops, low tessitura) and can therefore not be rendered playable for the flute without changes."

== Sonatas ==
=== Sonata in B♭ major, K. 10 ===
There are three movements:

1. Allegro
2. Andante, in E♭ major
3. Menuetto I and II (Trio II in E♭ major)

=== Sonata in G major, K. 11 ===
There are three movements:

1. Andante
2. Allegro
3. Menuetto, in G minor (da capo Allegro)

=== Sonata in A major, K. 12 ===
There are two movements:

1. Andante
2. Allegro

=== Sonata in F major, K. 13 ===
There are three movements:

1. Allegro
2. Andante, in F minor and A♭ major
3. Menuetto I and II

=== Sonata in C major, K. 14 ===
There are three movements:

1. Allegro
2. Allegro
3. Menuetto I and Menuetto II en Carillon, Menuetto II in F major

=== Sonata in B♭ major, K. 15 ===
There are two movements:

1. Andante maestoso
2. Allegro grazioso
