= Sonatas for viola da gamba and harpsichord (Bach) =

Compositions by J.S. Bach

- BWV: 1027; 1028; 1029
- by J. S. Bach
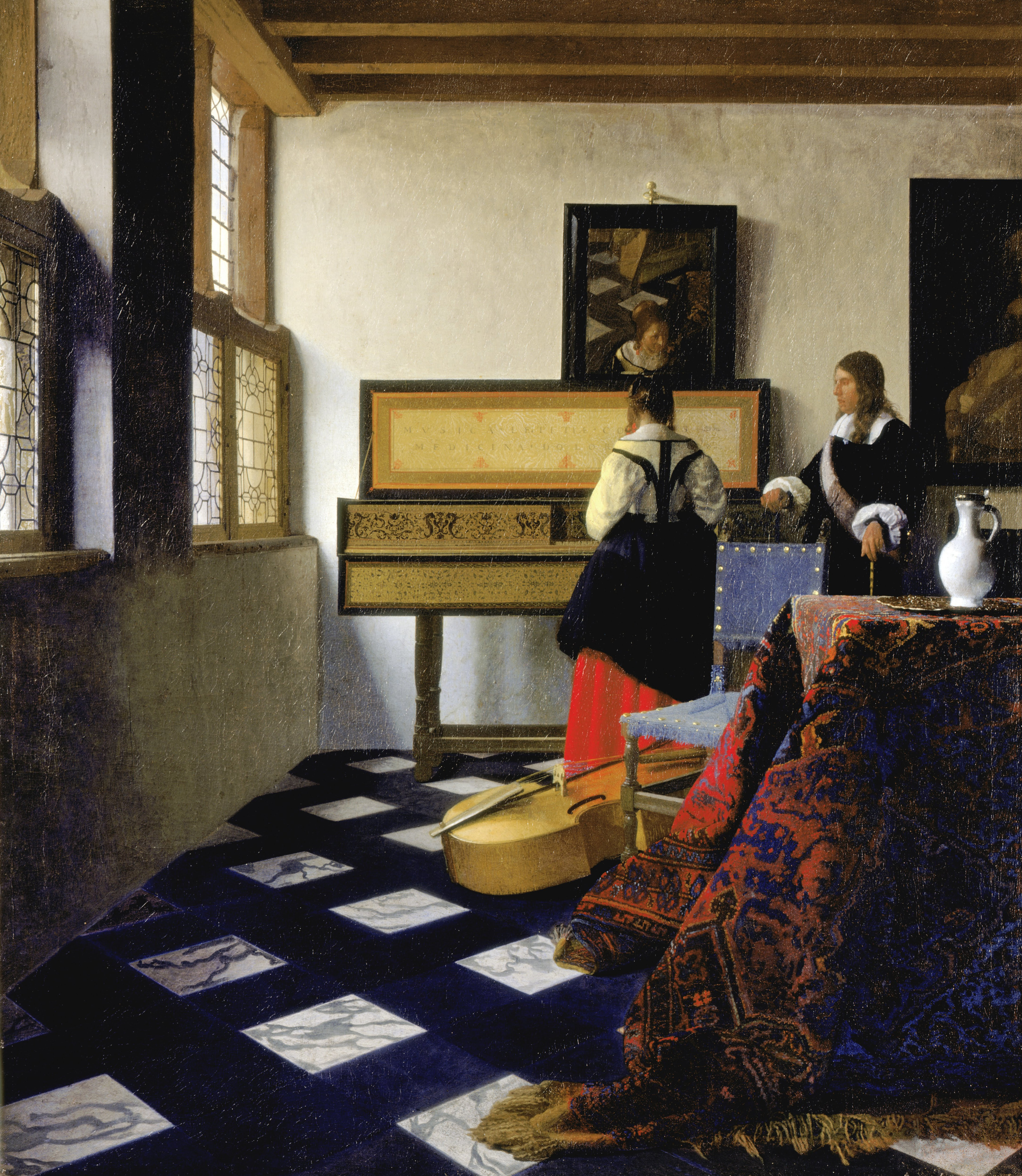
- The music lesson, with virginal and viola da gamba, Jan Vermeer

The sonatas for viola da gamba and harpsichord, BWV 1027–1029, are three sonatas composed by Johann Sebastian Bach for viola da gamba and harpsichord. They probably date from the late 1730s and early 1740s.

== Origins ==
Although the dating of Bach's three sonatas for viola da gamba and cembalo has presented problems for musicologists, because only an autograph score of the first sonata BWV 1027 survives, there is now general consensus that the works were written in Leipzig at some time in the late 1730s and early 1740s. Prior to that commentators had suggested that they dated from an earlier period when Bach was in Köthen or even beforehand: the viola da gamba player Christian Ferdinand Abel was one of the court musicians of Prince Leopold at Cöthen. Bach moved to Leipzig as Thomaskantor in 1723 and in 1729 was appointed director of the Collegium Musicum, a chamber music society that put on weekly concerts at the Café Zimmermann.

Other versions of BWV 1027 exist: there is a trio sonata for two transverse flutes and continuo (BWV 1039); as well as a trio sonata for organ in three movements. Russell Stinson has determined that the organ work, with the first two movements transcribed from BWV 1039/i and BWV 1039/ii and the last from BWV 1027/iv, is not by Bach but most probably by Johann Peter Kellner.

In the late 1980s four new editions of the sonatas appeared, including the Urtext edition of Laurence Dreyfus for C.F. Peters; in a long accompanying text Dreyfus presented detailed arguments for the works to be dated to Bach's period in Leipzig. In a subsequent study of Bach's chamber music, Wolff (1985) came to the same conclusion and gave provisional dates for many of Bach's chamber music and concertos in his Leipzig period.

The dating of BWV 1027–1028 is explained in detail by Jones (2013) in his analysis of Bach's instrumental works, including his flute sonata in E major (BWV 1035), the triple concerto in A minor for flute, violin and harpsichord (BWV 1044) and the trio sonata for flute, violin and continuo from The Musical Offering (BWV 1079).

== Musical structure ==
Viola da Gamba Sonata in G major, BWV 1027
I. Adagio

II. Allegro ma non tanto

III. Andante

IV. Allegro moderato
Performed by John Michel (cello) with pianist

=== Sonata No. 1 in G major, BWV 1027 ===
1. Adagio
2. Allegro ma non tanto
3. Andante
4. Allegro moderato

The last contrapuntal movement, although not labelled as a bourrée, makes reference to this dance form by commencing with a quaver figure on the fourth beat of the bar.

=== Sonata No. 2 in D major, BWV 1028 ===
1. [Adagio]
2. [Allegro]
3. Andante
4. Allegro

The first movement begins with the gamba introducing a thematic fragment repeated by the harpsichord. The following movement includes echos and from the first one, especially of the latter half of the first movement. The third movement is in the rhythm of a siciliano, followed by a fast movement in 6/8 time. This sonata was written for the seven-string viola da gamba also used in Bach's St Matthew Passion.

=== Sonata No. 3 in G minor, BWV 1029 ===
Viola da Gamba Sonata in G minor, BWV 1029
I. Vivace

II. Adagio

III. Allegro
Performed by John Michel (cello) with pianist

1. Vivace
2. Adagio
3. Allegro

The musicologist Philipp Spitta has described this sonata as being "of the greatest beauty and most striking originality." The sonata begins with a theme by the viola da gamba, which is soon joined by the harpsichord. This is driven forward with lively figuration. The middle movement, in B♭ major, allows the parts to intertwine even more, ending with the allegro, which begins with repeated notes in the gamba part soon to be taken up by the lower harpsichord part.

== Autograph manuscript ==
Autograph manuscript for BWV 1027

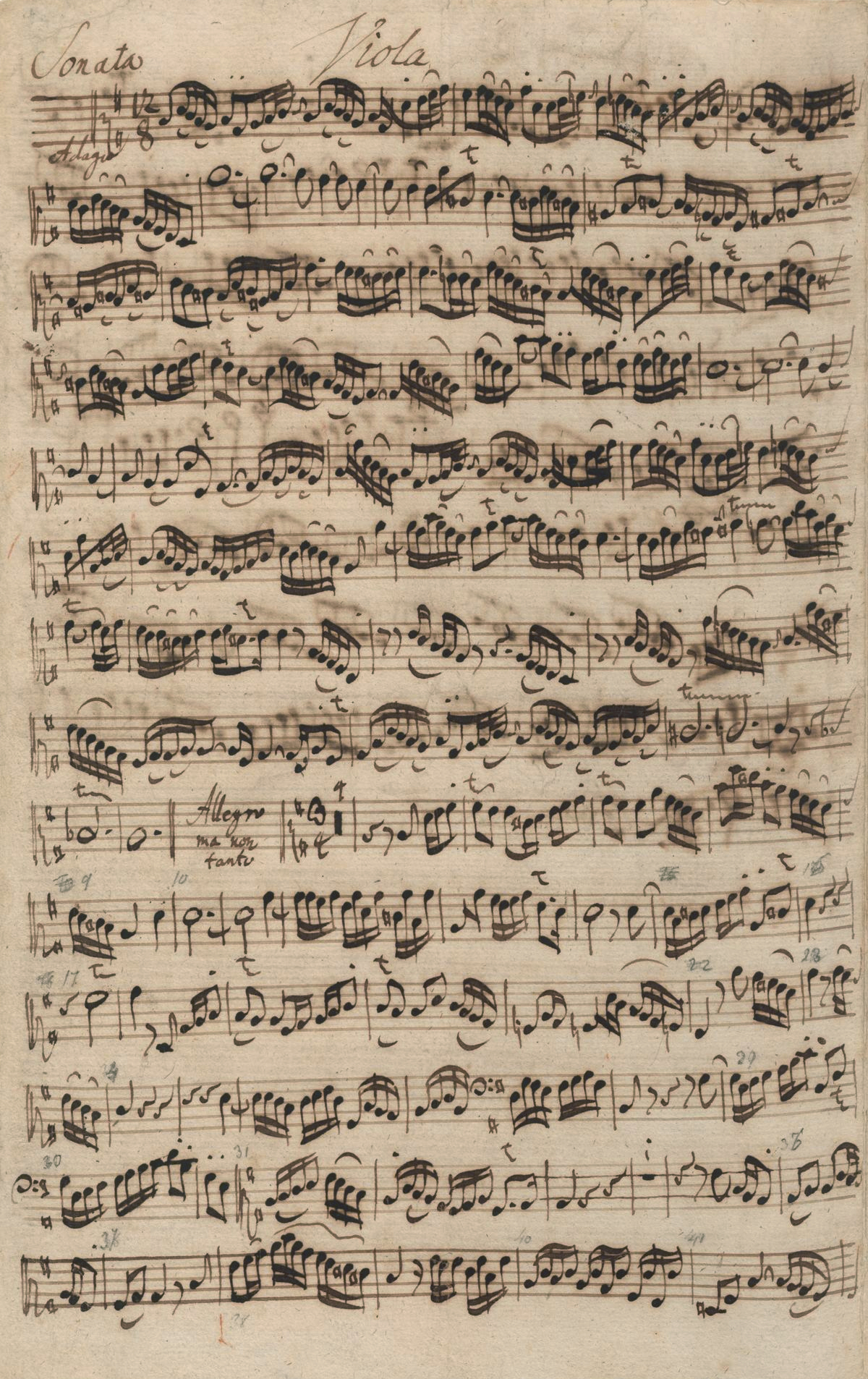
Viola da gamba part

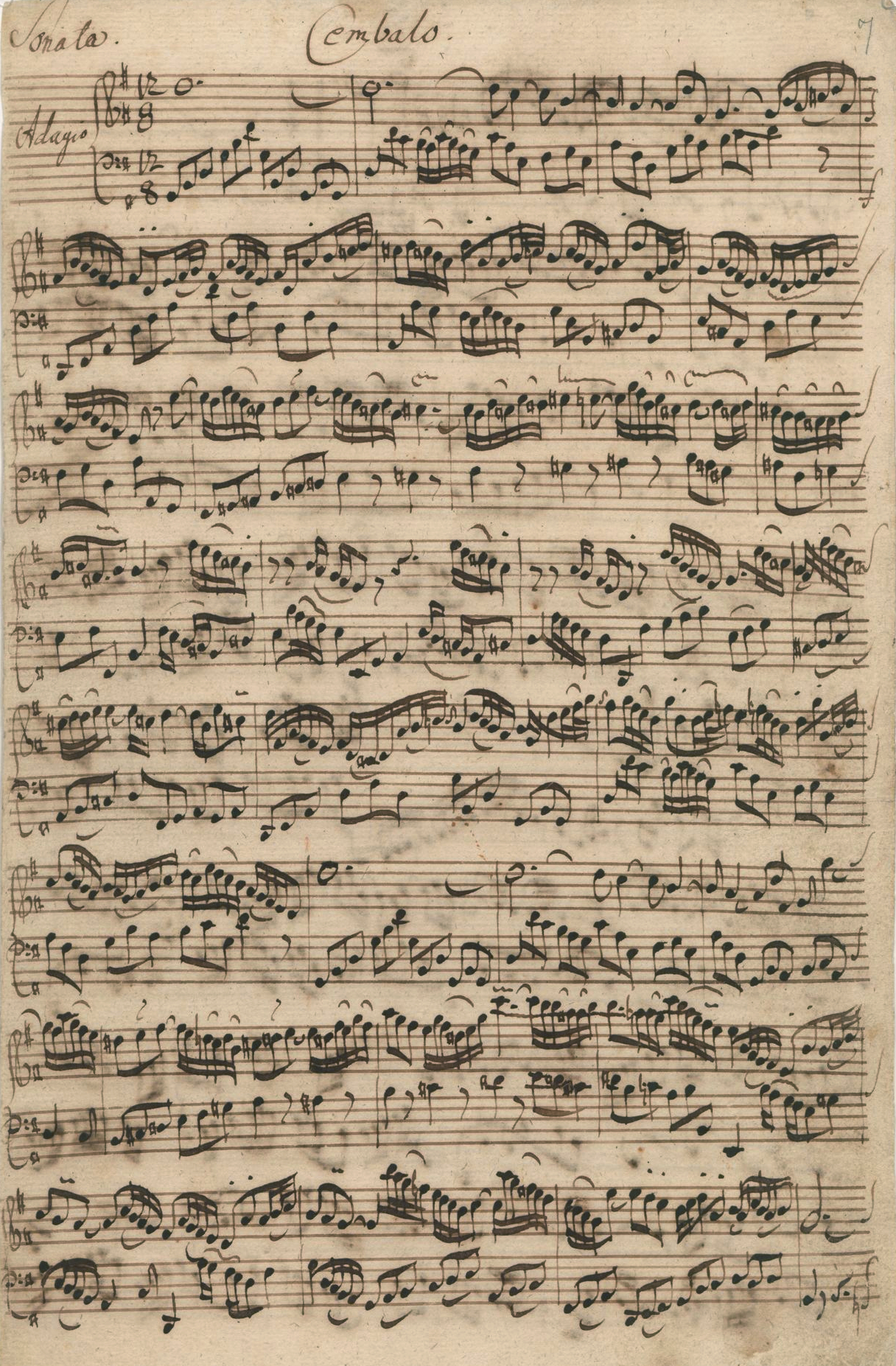
Harpsichord part

== Published editions ==
- Bach, J. S. (1985), Laurence Dreyfus (ed.), Drei Sonaten für Viola da Gamba und Cembalo, BWV 1027–1029, Leipzig: C. F. Peters (with extensive concluding remarks and critical notes)

== Sources ==
- Berger, Melvin (2011). Guide to Sonatas: Music for One or Two Instruments. Knopf Doubleday Publishing Group. ISBN 9780307754882.
- Cyr, Mary (1989), "Review: Three Sonatas for Viola da Gamba and Harpsichord (BWV 1027–1029) by J. S. Bach, Hans Eppstein, Lucy Robinson, Laurence Dreyfus and Jean-Louis Charbonnier", Early Music, 17: 106, 108, 110, 113, doi:10.1093/earlyj/XVII.1.106, JSTOR 3127270
- Jenne, Natalie; Little, Meredith (2001). Dance and the Music of J.S. Bach. Indiana University Press. ISBN 9780253214645.
- Jones, Richard D. P. (2013). The Creative Development of Johann Sebastian Bach, Volume II: 1717–1750: Music to Delight the Spirit. Oxford University Press. ISBN 978-0191503849.
- Kenyon, Nicholas (2011). The Faber Pocket Guide to Bach. Faber & Faber. ISBN 9780571272006.
- Williams, Peter (2003), The Organ Music of J. S. Bach, Cambridge University Press
- Wolff, Christoph (May 1985). "Bach's Leipzing Chamber Music". Early Music. 13 (2): 165–175. doi:10.1093/earlyj/13.2.165.
