= Daniel Yeadon =

Australian cellist and viola da gambist

- Born: England
- Origin: Australia
- Occupation: Instrumentalist
- Instruments: Cello, viola da gamba

Daniel Yeadon is a British-born Australian cellist and viola da gambist.

Together with his partner Neal Peres Da Costa and artistic director Richard Tognetti he won the 2008 ARIA Award for Best Classical Album for the album Bach: Sonatas for Violin & Keyboard.

Yeadon is a member of Florilegium and has released albums performing with Da Costa, Genevieve Lacey, Pieter Wispelwey and Richard Egarr, amongst others.

== Awards ==
=== ARIA Music Awards ===
The ARIA Music Awards is an annual awards ceremony held by the Australian Recording Industry Association. They commenced in 1987.

Year	Nominee / work	Award	Result	Ref.
2008	Bach Sonatas for Violin & Keyboard (with Richard Tognetti & Neal Peres Da Costa)	Best Classical Album	Won	
