= Titanic Records =

American record label

Titanic Records is a record label founded in 1973 in Cambridge, Massachusetts, United States. It was one of the pioneers in the recording of early music on period instruments. During the LP era, Titanic released nearly a hundred recordings, including performances by such world-famous artists as Mieczyslaw Horszowski, Joel Cohen, and Malcolm Bilson.

Now a division of Sirius Music, Inc., based in New York City, Titanic is expanding its CD catalogue to include music of all periods, while maintaining its commitment to early music and periodically reissuing titles from the LP list.

== See also ==
- List of record labels
