= Gonzalo X. Ruiz =

Argentine oboist

Gonzalo X. Ruiz is an Argentine baroque oboist. He was born in La Plata, Argentina, and studied at the San Francisco Conservatory before pursuing a performing career in the US and Europe. He has been the principal oboist of the Buenos Aires Philharmonic and the New Century Chamber Orchestra, and since 2009 has been a member of the faculty of the Juilliard School.

He has issued a number of recordings of baroque works. His reconstruction and recording of Bach's Orchestral Suite No. 2 in B Minor, to feature the oboe rather than the flute, was nominated for a Grammy Award in 2009. In issuing the recording, Ruiz argued that the suite was originally composed for the oboe. In 2014 he applied a similar theory to a series of Bach's harpsichord concertos, reconstructing them for the oboe and recording them with Monica Huggett and the Portland Baroque Orchestra in an album reviewed by Gramophone as an "exceptional union of scholarly curiosity and excellent musicianship".
