= Sonata in A minor for Solo Flute, Wq. 132 =

Sonata for Solo Flute
- by Carl Philipp Emanuel Bach
- The first movement of the sonata
- Key: A minor
- Catalogue: Wq.132; H 562
- Composed: ~1747
- Published: 1763
- Movements: 3 (Poco adagio, Allegro, Allegro)

The Sonata for Solo Flute in A minor, Wq.132, H 562, is a sonata for flute, without Basso Continuo or accompanying instruments, composed by Carl Philipp Emanuel Bach. The sonata is considered, along with Telemann's Fantasias for Solo Flute and J.S. Bach's A minor partita, one of the most significant works for unaccompanied flute before the 20th century. It is the sole flute work by Bach that was printed and published during his lifetime. No manuscript of it has been discovered.

== History ==
Bach wrote this sonata in Berlin around 1747, when he was a chamber harpsichordist of Frederick the Great. The king was also a flutist, and had many composers write flute compositions for him. Bach devoted several compositions to the flauto traverso. In 1747, he composed a series of works for the instrument, including this sonata.

Some scholars claim that this sonata was intended for the king. Indeed, it was printed during the king's lifetime. But at the time, compositions written for the Prussian king were not permitted to be published and made public. It may have been published without the king's knowledge. This may explain the publication date of 1763, nearly two decades after the sonata was written.

Today, for various practical reasons, there are also editions that add an accompaniment, for example a piano.

== Description ==
=== Style ===
The time this sonata was written, was a time that Bach, because of his position as an harpsichordist of the King, was surrounded by many well-established musicians, like Johann Joachim Quantz, the king's personal flute teacher and one of his many composers. Influenced by them, Bach's style changed: besides signs of his father's Baroque style, he included features of the new galant style, such as slow harmonic motion. He continued to use ornaments, which plenty of them exist in his work, in a combination of all the styles of this period. Also, in this particular sonata, Bach used the silence technique, leaving twice an entire measure without notes (Movement 1, measure 91, and movement 3, measure 93), so, as there is no accompanying instruments, in these two measures, there is complete silence. This sonata is an early prototype of this change.

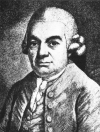
The composer

The biggest difference with his father's only work for unaccompanied flute, the Partita in A minor, BWV 1013, a suite of four dance movements (Allemande, Corrente, Sarabande, Bouree anglaise), are that in the sonata, there is nearly no indication of dance (except the second movement), and its three movements (Poco adagio, Allegro, Allegro) do not follow the standard format of fast–slow–fast, but slow–fast–fast, a format also shown in eleven more of his sonatas between 1735 and 1747. This format reflects the trends of this time in German culture.

=== Structure ===
The sonata uses the slow–fast–fast movement format. The tempo unifies the work. The first movement is slow (Poco adagio), and the second is faster (Allegro), the third (Allegro) is slightly more faster than the second, so the result, when played, is unified acoustically.

Bach also used motivic development to unify his work, as his father did. Examples are the "scalar arch" motif in the first measures, repeated in fragments in the whole sonata, and the descending half-step motif, which appears at the beginning of every movement.

The melodic line seems more angular than soft, as it is clear from the use of sixteenth notes in the Allegro movements, broken chords, thirds and frequent rests, all of them a mix of Baroque and Galant style.

=== Movements ===
All movements are written in rounded-binary form.

==== I. Poco adagio ====
The first movement, in 3/8, has a similar style as J. S. Bach's similar works. The movement starts with a scalar theme, which itself expresses sadness. Inside it, there are some "half-step" motifs, which represent tear, and it begins with some slurs, adding in the momentum of the work.

In measures 25–30 and 80–85, Bach made the melody sound like three different voices, an impressive achievement of the composer. In the measure 30, he added a cadence in a diminished F^{♯7} chord, followed in measure 37 by a cadence in C major, which ends with a diminished chord of c^{♯7}. In measure 41, a cadence in D minor develops, while in the next measure, the harmony modulates to E minor. In measures 50 and 71, the main theme appears again, the second time in the tonic key (A minor), thus creating the unity needed in the rounded-binary form. In measure 81, there is another one cadence that is similar to that of the measure 30, increasing the musical tension, while the last cadence, in measure 93, is the biggest of the others (but still brief), needing one flutist's breath. As so, having a dominant position, it delays the dissolution further.

==== II. Allegro ====
The second movement, in 2/4, is seen by some as developing several mid-century elements about Allegro movements. With a seasoning of wide leaps and swift modulations, some think it is again closer to some of J.S. Bach's compositions.

In the first measures, there is an eighth note, suggesting dancing, the reality is that the entering movement is in fact a dancing movement. Nearly in the measure 40, the harmony moves to C major. Two more occasions that the music sounds like it is many voices, while it is only one, is at measures 57–61 and 104–108. In measure 76, a cadence starts, but on the same measure and until measure 84, there is a part with notes under legatos, which seems identical to the style of the first movement, employing the same "half-step" motif. In the same place, there is exemplified one of the unifying motifs found in the sonata. A little later, quick arpeggios appear, changing the scheme. This leads, in measures 85–93, to a half-cadence filled with sixteenth-notes. The movement closes with a variation of the main theme.

==== III. Allegro ====
The final movement, in 3/8, is faster and more difficult than the other two. The movement has the slowest harmonic line and less chromaticism than elsewhere in the work. However, it also deploys the most technical features.

The opening theme of the movement, which contains a part of the opening movement of the first movement, reminds the listener of a rocket rising, again using motivic development (particularly diminution and retrograde). The harmony moves to E minor in measure 52. There is high tension in the movement until measures 91–93, where a two-measure C major arpeggio stops suddenly, followed by a measure-wide rest. After that, the theme suddenly seems like a Baroque-era corrente movement. In measures 95–101, there is a longer scalic motif full of sixteenth notes. The final section of the work starts at measure 102, a cadence appears at measures 136–137, returning to the original tempo. The movement ends with an appropriately bold passage.
