= Michael Gabriel Fredersdorf =

Prussian valet to Frederick the Great (1708–1758)

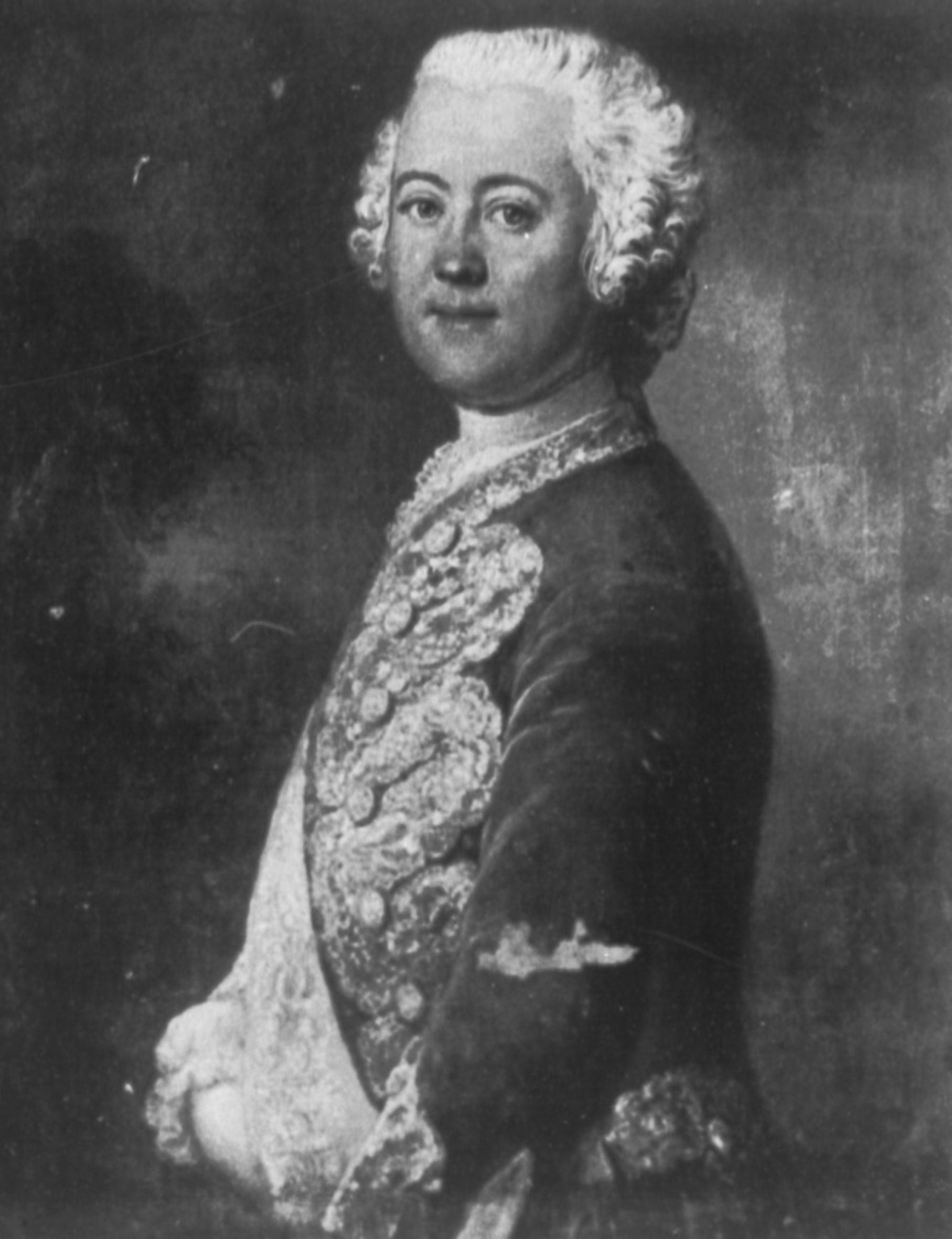
- Born: 1708; Gartz, Kingdom of Prussia
- Died: 12 January 1758 (aged 49–50); Potsdam, Kingdom of Prussia
- Occupation: Valet
- Known for: Friendship with Frederick the Great

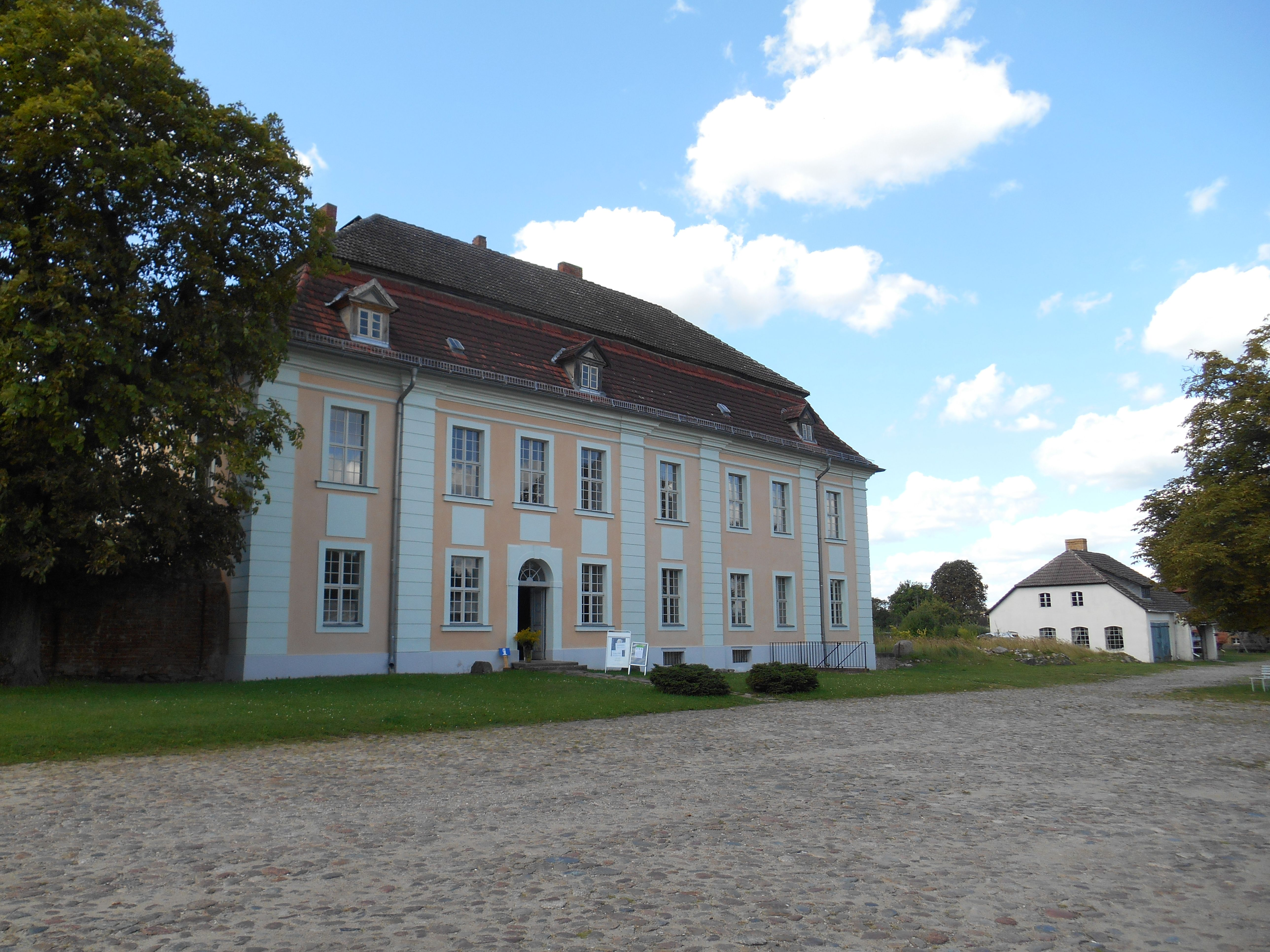
Zernikow House

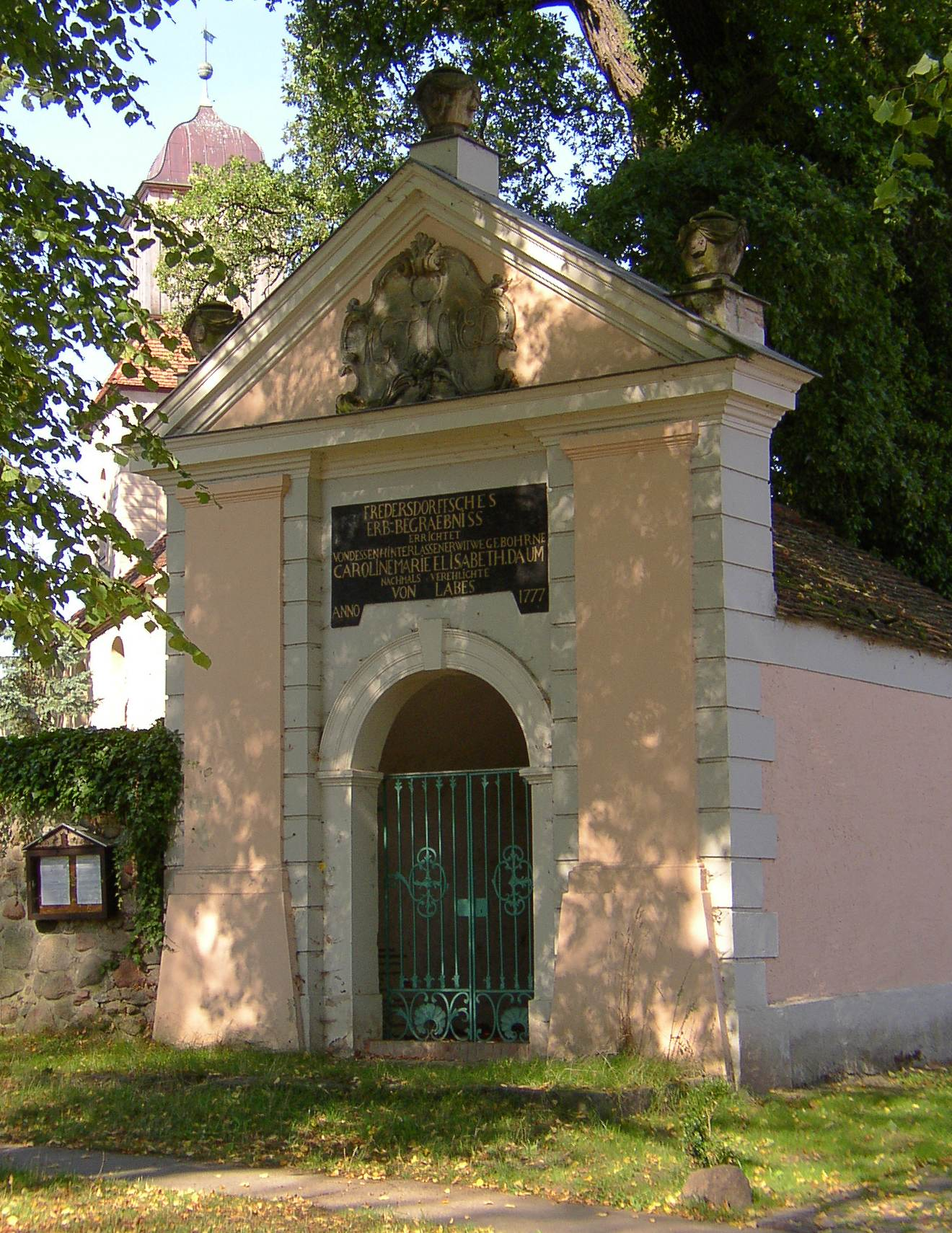
Fredersdorf's grave chapel at Zernikow

Michael Gabriel Fredersdorf (1708 – 12 January 1758) was the longest-standing valet and companion of Frederick II of Prussia.

The two young men met when the future Frederick II was still in prison for having attempted to run off with his former companion, Hans Hermann von Katte. At the time, Fredersdorf was four years older than the heir to the throne and served in the army, being the son of a peasant.

Both contemporaries and historians have speculated that Fredersdorf and Frederick II had a homosexual relationship, yet there is no definitive proof. Voltaire would later describe the relationship in his Memoires as, "This soldier, young, handsome, well made, and who played the flute, served to entertain the prisoner in more than one fashion."

When Frederick moved to Rheinsberg Palace with his wife in 1736, he made Fredersdorf his valet. When he ascended to the throne in 1740, he furthermore made him his private treasurer and, within less than a month, gave him the estate of Zernikow as a present. Later he also made him director of the royal theatre. When the king moved to Sanssouci, his valet's bedroom adjoined his own, still shown today. The royal gardens director Heinrich Ludwig Manger later called the chamberlain "the king's chamber lover" in a book of 1789.

For several years, Fredersdorf had been courting Caroline Marie Elisabeth Daum (born 27 July 1730 in Potsdam; died 10 March 1810 in Berlin), the daughter of the rich arms manufacturer and banker Gottfried Adolph Daum. The king was unwilling to let his servant marry. However, once Fredersdorf, who was often ill, explained to Frederick that bettering his health urgently required someone to look after him, the king acquiesced. In a letter to Fredersdorf dated to November 1753, the king wrote: "marry sooner rather than later, if this will be of use to your [palliative] care". The church book of the Potsdam Garrison Church records the marriage took place on 30 December 1753. Caroline, who had been wed to serve as nursemaid, spent her marriage "as a virgin amidst a thousand worries". Despite this, the couple managed to come to an agreement, and Caroline lived "in blissful freedom, harmony, and inner joy" with her husband until his death.

Fredersdorf was dismissed on 9 April 1757, being accused of financial irregularities. He died, ashamed of his lost honor, within less than a year. He was buried in Zernikow. He had no children. His wife however remarried and had children with her second husband, royal chamberlain Johann Labes. Later she raised her grandson, the poet Ludwig Achim von Arnim.

== Sources ==
- Crompton, Louis (2006). Homosexuality and Civilization. Belknap Press. ISBN 978-0-6740-2233-1. (at Harvard University Press)
