= Ashley Solomon =

British flute and recorder player

Ashley Solomon is a British flute and recorder player. He is both professor of recorder and head of the historical performance department of the Royal College of Music in London. He has taught there since 1994, and became the first head of the historical performance department in 2006. In 2014 he was appointed to a new chair in historic performance created for him by the college.

Until 1991, Solomon studied as an undergraduate and then as a post-graduate at the Royal Academy of Music in London. In the same year he won the Moeck/SRP Solo Recorder Playing Competition, and gave the winner's recital at the Wigmore Hall in Wigmore Street, London. Also in the same year, he and Neal Peres Da Costa started an early music group, Florilegium; Solomon has been director of the group since 2001.
