= Three Preludes (Muczynski) =

Robert Muczynski wrote Three Preludes for Unaccompanied Flute, Opus 18, in 1962, shortly after finishing his Sonata for Flute and Piano, Opus 14 (1960–61). Despite the title, Muczynski meant them to be encores.

According to the composer, the preludes fleetingly portray different moods, such as "jaunty, nocturnal, and free-wheeling".

== Form ==
The three preludes are:

1. Allegro
2. Andante molto
3. Allegro molto

The third prelude uses accents to accentuate the off-beat rhythm.
