= Flute Sonata in B minor, BWV 1030 =

Flute Sonata in B minor
- BWV 1030
- by J. S. Bach
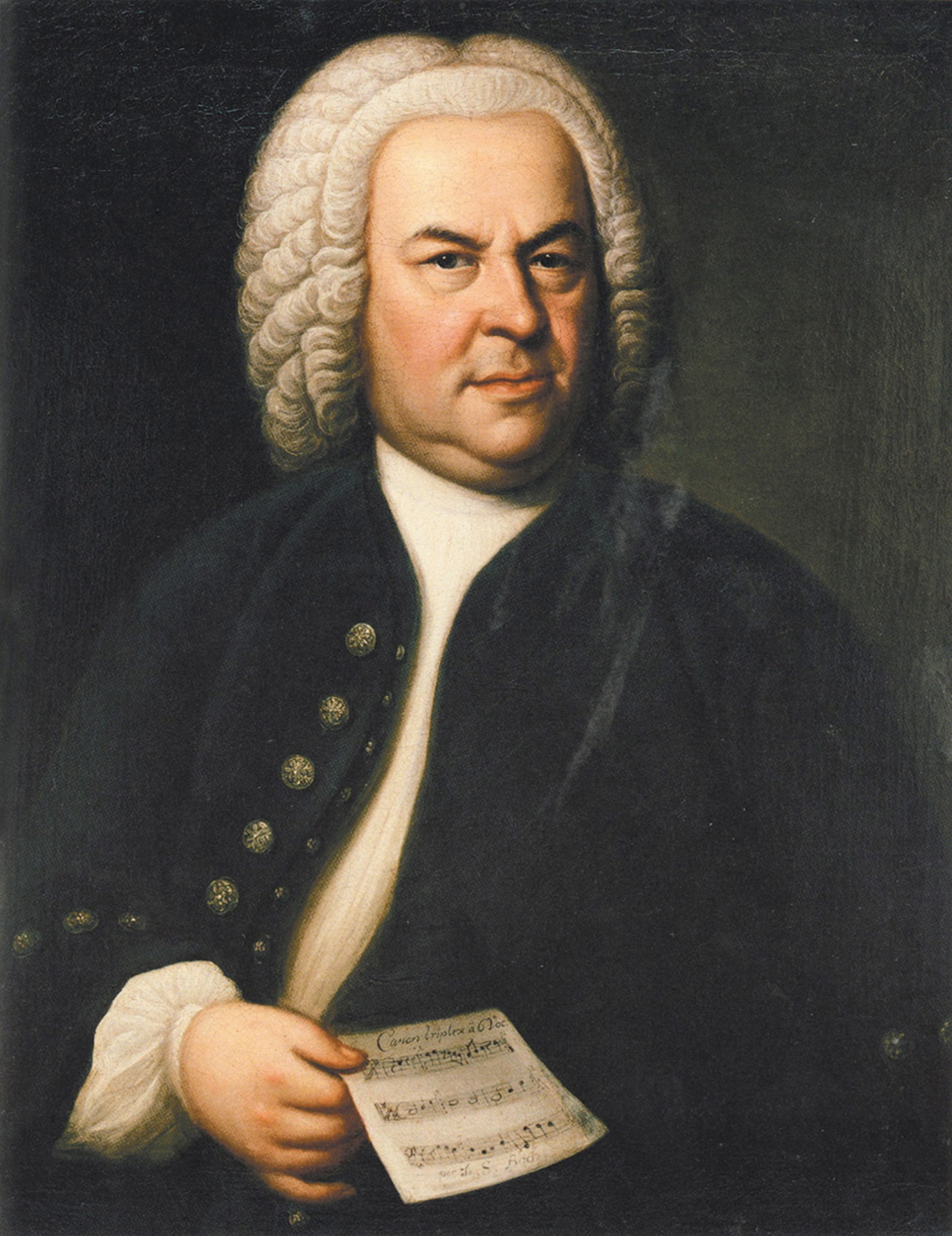
- Bach in 1746; 1748 portrait by Elias Gottlob Haussmann
- Composed: After 1735
- Movements: 3
- Scoring: Flute and harpsichord

The Sonata in B minor for transverse flute and obbligato harpsichord by Johann Sebastian Bach (BWV 1030) is a sonata in three movements:

1. Andante, 4/4
2. Largo e dolce, 6/8
3. Presto, 2/2

The existing autograph manuscript dates from after 1735, when Bach led the Collegium Musicum in Leipzig. There are errors in the manuscript, and another harpsichord part in G minor that is otherwise the same though transposed, that suggests that this, like the G minor and D major harpsichord concertos, may be among the works Bach transcribed from earlier works originally for other instrumental combinations and in other keys to be playable by performers at hand.

== Media ==
I. Andante

II. Largo e dolce

III. Presto
Performed by Alex Murray (transverse flute) and Martha Goldstein (harpsichord)

I. Andante

II. Largo e dolce

III. Presto
Performed by Felix Skowronek (transverse flute) and Martha Goldstein (lute-harpsichord)
