= Florilegium (band) =

- Genres: Historically informed performance
- Years active: 1991–present
- Members: Ashley Solomon (flute, recorder); Bojan Čičić (violin); Jennifer Morsches (cello); Reiko Ichise (viola da gamba); Terence Charlston (harpsichord)
- Past members: Rachel Podger (violin); Daniel Yeadon (cello, bass viol); Neal Peres Da Costa (harpsichord); James Johnstone (harpsichord); Lucy Russell (violin); Kati Debretzeni (violin); Sarah Moffatt (violin); Robert Nairn (double bass); Eligio Quinteiro (theorbo, guitar)
- Website: florilegium.org.uk

Florilegium is an early music ensemble based in London. It was founded in 1991 by the harpsichordist Neal Peres Da Costa and the flautist Ashley Solomon, who is now director of the group. It specialises in period performance of Baroque and early Romantic chamber music.

== History ==
The group was founded in 1991, and gave its first performance at the Blackheath Concert Halls in that year. It has since performed at the Wigmore Hall in London, and in many countries worldwide. A recording of the cello sonatas of Antonio Vivaldi with Pieter Wispelwey as soloist won an award, as did a recording of the chamber music of Georg Philipp Telemann.

== See also ==
- List of early music ensembles
