= Robert Muczynski =

- Born: March 19, 1929; Chicago, Illinois
- Died: May 25, 2010 (aged 81) Tucson, Arizona
- Occupation: Composer
- Instrument: Piano

Robert Muczynski (March 19, 1929 – May 25, 2010) was an American composer.

Muczynski studied piano with Walter Knupfer and composition with Alexander Tcherepnin at DePaul University in Chicago, where he received both his Bachelor of Music degree (1950) and his Master of Music degree (1952) in Piano Performance. Muczynski later taught at DePaul University, Loras College, and Roosevelt University, before settling in Tucson, Arizona in the 1960s where he joined the faculty of the University of Arizona as a composer-in-residence and chairman of the composition department. He held both positions until his retirement in 1988.

Among the more than fifty published compositions in his catalog, Sonata for flute and piano, Op. 14 (1961), Sonata for alto saxophone and piano (1970), and Time Pieces for clarinet and piano (1984) have entered the repertoire and remain frequently performed in recitals, as has much of his solo piano music. Works by Muczynski have also appeared with increasing frequency on programs in the U.S., Europe, the Far East, Australia and Mexico. Orchestral works have been performed by the Chicago Symphony, the Cincinnati Symphony Orchestra, the National Symphony Orchestra, D.C., the Tucson Symphony Orchestra, the Minnesota Orchestra and others abroad.

== Personal life ==
Muczynski was born in Chicago, Illinois, where he attended Steinmetz High School, and graduated in 1949. He then matriculated to DePaul University in the late 1940s, where he studied composition with Alexander Tcherepnin. At age 29 he made his Carnegie Hall debut, performing a program of his own compositions for piano. Muczynski wrote his final composition, Desperate Measures (Paganini Variations) (for piano), in 1996. He died from leukemia in Tucson, Arizona, on May 25, 2010.

== Notable works ==
=== Chamber music ===
- Op. 4 Allegro Deciso for brass sextet and timpani (1952) SP
- Fragments for flute, clarinet, and bassoon (1958) GS
- Op. 11/1 Trumpet Trio (1959) GS
- Fanfare for Brass and Percussion (1961)
- Op. 16 Movements for wind quintet (1962) SP
- Op. 26 Fantasy Trio for Clarinet, Violoncello and Piano (1969) TP
- Op. 27 Voyage for trumpet, horn, and trombone (1969) GS
- Op. 31 String Trio for violin, viola, and cello (1971–72) TP
- Op. 34a Duos for two flutes (1973) GS
- Op. 34b Duos for clarinet and flute (1973) GS
- Op. 45 Quintet for Winds (1985) TP

=== Works for unaccompanied instruments ===
- Dedication Recessional for organ (1957)
- Op. 11/2 Three Designs for Three Timpani (1960) GS
- Statements for percussion (1961) GS
- Op. 18 Three Preludes for unaccompanied flute (1963) GS
- Gallery, Suite for Unaccompanied Cello (1966) GS
- Op. 32 Impromptus for Solo Tuba (1972) GS
- Op. 42 Profiles for harpsichord (1982) HM

=== Publishers ===
- 1 GS G. Schirmer, Inc.
- TP Theodore Presser Co.
- SP Shawnee Press, Inc.
- HM Hinshaw Music, Inc.
- AMP Associated Music Publishers

=== Concertos ===
- Op. 2 Divertimento (1951)
- Op. 7 Piano Concerto No. 1 (1954) SP
- Op. 41 Concerto for Alto Saxophone and Chamber Orchestra (1981) TP

=== Solo piano ===
- Op. 1 Sonatina (1949) AMP
- Op. 3 Five Sketches (1952)
- Op. 6 Six Preludes (1954) GS
- Op. 8 Variations on a Theme of Tcherepnin (1955)
- Op. 9 First Piano Sonata (1957) SP
- Op. 13 Suite (1960) GS
- Op. 15 Toccata (1961) GS
- Op. 19 A Summer Journal (1964) GS
- Op. 21 Fables: Nine Pieces for the Young (1965) GS
- Op. 22 Second Piano Sonata (1966) TP
- Op. 23 Diversions: Nine Pieces for Students (1967) GS
- Op. 30 Seven (1971) GS
- Op. 35 Third Piano Sonata (1973–74) TP
- Op. 37 Maverick Pieces (1976) GS
- Op. 40 Masks (1980) TP
- Op. 44 Dream Cycle (1983) TP
- Op. 48 Desperate Measures (Paganini Variations) (1996) TP

=== Orchestral music ===
- Op. 5 Symphony No. 1 (1953)
- Op. 10 Galena: A Town (Suite for orchestra) (1958)
- Op. 12 Dovetail Overture for orchestra (1960) GS
- Op. 17 Dance Movements for orchestra (1962) GS
- Op. 20 Symphonic Dialogues (1965) GS
- Op. 28 Charade for orchestra (1971) GS
- Second Symphony (1974)
- Op. 38 Serenade for Summer for orchestra (1976) TP
- Op. 39 Symphonic Memoir for orchestra (1979) TP

=== Film scores ===
- The Great Unfenced (1963)
- Yankee Painter: The Work of Winslow Homer (1963)
- American Realists (1964)
- Cajititlan (1965)
- Charles Burchfield: This Art (1966)
- The Clowns Never Laugh (1967)
- Terra Sancta (1967)
- Bellota: Story of Roundup (1969)
- Journey Thru Eden (1975)

=== Choral music ===
- Alleluia for chorus (1961), withdrawn
- I Never Saw A Moor for chorus (1967), withdrawn
- Op. 33 Synonyms for Life for chorus and piano (1973), GS

=== Works list by date of composition ===
Opus title, date of composition, and publisher:

- Op. 1 Sonatina for piano (1949) AMP
- Op. 2 Divertimento for piano and orchestra (1951)
- Op. 3 Five Sketches for piano (1952)
- Op. 4 Allegro Deciso for brass sextet and timpani (1952) SP
- American Songs for piano, 4 hands (1952) withdrawn
- Op. 5 Symphony No. 1 (1953)
- Op. 6 Six Preludes for piano (1954) GS
- Op. 7 Piano Concerto No. 1 (1954) SP
- Op. 8 Variations on a Theme of Tcherepnin for piano (1955)
- Op. 9 First Piano Sonata (1957) SP
- Dedication Recessional for organ (1957)
- Op. 10 Galena: A Town (Suite for orchestra) (1958)
- Fragments for flute, clarinet, and bassoon (1958) GS
- Op. 11/1 Trumpet Trio (1959) GS
- Op. 11/2 Three Designs for Three Timpani (1960) GS
- Op. 12 Dovetail Overture for orchestra (1960) GS
- Op. 13 Suite for piano (1960) GS
- Op. 14 Sonata for Flute and Piano (1960) GS
- Alleluia for chorus (1961) withdrawn
- Statements for percussion (1961) GS
- Fanfare for Brass and Percussion (1961)
- Op. 15 Toccata for piano (1961) GS
- Op. 16 Movements for wind quintet (1962) SP
- Op. 17 Dance Movements for orchestra (1962) GS
- Fuzzette, the Tarantula, for narrator, flute, alto saxophone, and piano (1962) TP
- Op. 18 Three Preludes for unaccompanied flute (1963) GS
- Score for the film The Great Unfenced (1963)
- Score for the film Yankee Painter: The Work of Winslow Homer (1963)
- Op. 19 A Summer Journal for piano (1964) GS
- Score for the film American Realists (1964)
- Op. 20 Symphonic Dialogues (1965) GS
- Score for the film Cajititlan (1965)
- Op. 21 Fables: Nine Pieces for the Young for piano (1966) GS
- Gallery, Suite for Unaccompanied Cello (1966) GS
- Score for the film Charles Burchfield: This Art (1966)
- Op. 22 Second Piano Sonata (1967) TP
- Op. 23 Diversions: Nine Pieces for Students for piano (1967) GS
- Op. 24 First Piano Trio (1967) TP
- I Never Saw A Moor for chorus (1967) withdrawn
- Score for the film The Clowns Never Laugh (1967)
- Score for the film Terra Sancta (1967)
- Op. 25 Sonata for Cello and Piano (1968) GS
- Op. 26 Fantasy Trio for clarinet, cello, and piano (1969) TP
- Op. 27 Voyage for trumpet, horn, and trombone (1969) GS
- Score for the film Bellota: Story of Roundup (1969)
- Op. 28 Charade for orchestra (1971) GS
- Op. 29 Sonata for Alto Saxophone and Piano (1971) GS
- Op. 30 Seven for piano (1971) GS
- Op. 31 String Trio for violin, viola, and cello (1971–72) TP
- Op. 32 Impromptus for Solo Tuba (1972) GS
- Op. 33 Synonyms for Life for chorus and piano (1973) GS
- Op. 34a Duos for two flutes (1973) GS
- Op. 34b Duos for clarinet and flute (1973) GS
- Op. 35 Third Piano Sonata (1973–74) TP
- Second Symphony (1974)
- Op. 36 Second Piano Trio (1975) TP
- Score for the film Journey Thru Eden (1975)
- Op. 37 Maverick Pieces for piano (1976) GS
- Op. 38 Serenade for Summer for orchestra (1976) TP
- Op. 39 Symphonic Memoir for orchestra (1979) TP
- Op. 40 Masks for piano (1980) TP
- Op. 41 Concerto for Alto Saxophone and Chamber Orchestra (1981) TP
- Op. 42 Profiles for harpsichord (1982) HM
- Op. 43 Time Pieces for clarinet and piano (1983) TP
- Op. 44 Dream Cycle for piano (1983) TP
- Op. 45 Quintet for Winds (1985) TP
- Op. 46 Third Piano Trio (1986–87) TP
- Op. 47 Moments for flute and piano (1993) TP
- Op. 48 Desperate Measures (Paganini Variations) for piano (1994) TP
