= Flute Sonata in E minor, BWV 1034 =

Flute sonata composed by Johann Sebastian Bach

Flute Sonata in E minor
- BWV 1034
- by J. S. Bach
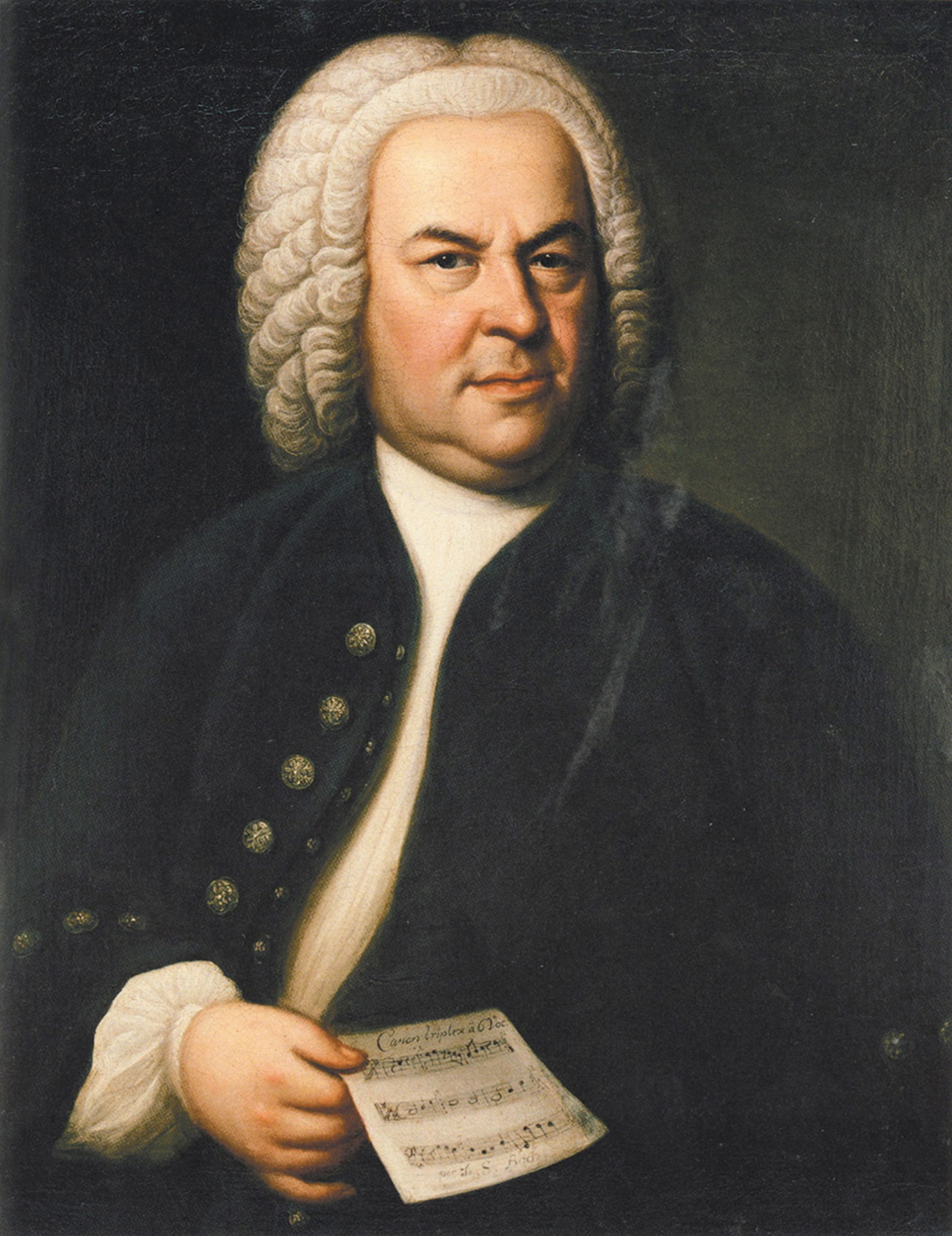
- Bach in 1746; 1748 portrait by Elias Gottlob Haussmann
- Composed: c. 1720s
- Movements: 4
- Scoring: Flute and continuo

Sonata in E minor for flute and basso continuo by J. S. Bach (BWV 1034) is a sonata in four movements:

1. Adagio ma non tanto,
2. Allegro,
3. Andante, 3/4
4. Allegro, 3/4

The basso continuo can be provided by a variety of instruments. For example, in complete Bach recordings, Stephen Preston on Brilliant Classics (originally recorded by CRD UK) is accompanied by harpsichord and viola da gamba while on Hänssler Classic Jean-Claude Gérard is accompanied by piano and bassoon.

The piece is largely believed to have been written during Bach's Köthen period (1717–23), when he was employed as Kapellmeister for Leopold, Prince of Anhalt-Köthen. However, there is some evidence that this may have been written slightly later, after Bach's move to Leipzig.

I. Adagio ma non tanto

II. Allegro

III. Andante

IV. Allegro
Performed by Alex Murray (traverso) and Martha Goldstein (harpsichord). See also the very similar recording by Al Goldstein and Martha Goldstein here
