= Neal Peres Da Costa =

Neal Peres Da Costa FAHA (born 1964) is an Australian harpsichordist, fortepianist and organist. He specialises in performance on historical keyboard instruments of the 17th, 18th and 19th centuries, for which he has gained international renown. He is a Professor and the Chair of the Early Music Unit at the Sydney Conservatorium of Music at the University of Sydney.

== Early life and education ==
Neal Peres Da Costa was born in Bahrain, then part of the Trucial States, to parents from Goa, India. His family moved to Australia when he was five years old. After graduating from the University of Sydney, Peres Da Costa attained a Postgraduate Diploma in Early Music from the Guildhall School of Music and a Master in Music Performance from the City University London. In 2002, he attained a PhD from the University of Leeds, where he researched performing practices in late 19th-century piano playing with particular reference to early recordings.

== Career ==
He spent ten years as Professor of Fortepiano at the Royal Academy of Music in London, where he was also a Lecturer in Performance Practice. He also held the post of Lecturer in 19th-Century Performing Practice for the master's degree at Trinity College of Music in London. In 2000 Peres Da Costa was Artist in Residence at Bretton Hall College at the University of Leeds. For many years he has been Professor on the annual International Summer Course in Spain held by the Fundacio 'la Caixa' and is currently a chamber music teacher at the annual International Early Music Course in Urbino in Italy. He has also taught on the Early Music Summer Course in Southern Bohemia.

He was the co-founder of Florilegium, an internationally renowned period instrument ensemble with which he performed around the world, including France, Spain, Germany, the Netherlands, North and South America, China and Australia, and in major venues such as the Concertgebouw in Amsterdam, the Teatro Colón in Buenos Aires and the Wigmore Hall in London, at which Florilegium held a prestigious residency for several years. Together they have made many award-winning recordings.

Neal Peres Da Costa has performed with the Academy of Ancient Music, the Orchestra of the Age of Enlightenment, the Australian Chamber Orchestra, the Sydney Symphony Orchestra, Sinfonia Australis, the Orchestra of the Antipodes, Pinchgut Opera, the Australian Brandenburg Orchestra, the Australian Bach Ensemble, the Sydney Philharmonia, and the Song Company; and with artists such as Dame Emma Kirkby, Nancy Argenta, James Bowman, Derek Lee Ragin, Michael Chance, and Pieter Wispelwey. He is a member of the Australian period-instrument ensemble Ironwood.

In 2007, he was awarded the University of Sydney's Alumni Award for Community Service for his contribution to music as a performer and educator, both within the University of Sydney and in the community at large.

He is principal continuo player on the ABC Classics recording of Bach Arias with Sara Macliver and Sally-Anne Russell. He has made several recordings on the ABC Classics label including the Bach Sonatas for Viola da Gamba and Harpsichord with Daniel Yeadon, and the Bach Sonatas for Violin and Harpsichord with Richard Tognetti and Daniel Yeadon, which won the 2008 ARIA fine arts award for Best Classical Album.

Peres Da Costa has given papers at the Royal Musical Association Conference in 2000, the Conference of 19th-Century Music at Leeds University in 2002 and the Symposium of 19th-Century Music during the Utrecht Early Music Festival in 2002. He regularly presents pre-concert lectures for Musica Viva Australia. He co-authored the entry for Performance Practice in the Oxford Companion to Music.

Peres Da Costa's first monograph "Off The Record: Performing Practices in Romantic Piano Playing" (Oxford, New York: 2012) examines the performing practices of late-nineteenth- and early-twentieth-century pianists captured on acoustic and electrical recordings and reproducing piano rolls and compares these with contemporaneous written texts. The monograph is accompanied by a Companion website with sound extracts and musical examples.

Peres Da Costa donates much of his spare time to students through his involvement in mentoring and by providing master classes for high school students and emerging artists.

== Personal life ==
Peres Da Costa and cellist Daniel Yeadon have been together since 1990. They were married in a civil partnership ceremony in the United Kingdom in 2007.

== Discography ==
=== Albums ===
List of albums, with selected details
Title	Details
A Grand Duo - The Clarinet and Early Romantics (with Colin Lawson)	Released: 1997; Format: CD; Label: Clarinet Classics (CC0015)
Telemann Paris Quartets (with Ensemble Florilegium, Ashley Solomon, Rachel Podger, Daniel Yeadon & Elizabeth Kenny)	Released: 1999; Format: CD; Label: Clarinet Classics (CCS 13598)
Bach Sonatas for Violin & Keyboard (with Richard Tognetti & Daniel Yeadon)	Released: 2007; Format: 5× CD; Label: ABC Classics (ABC 476)
The Galant Bassoon (with Matthew Wilkie & Kees Boersma )	Released: 2009; Format: CD; Label: Melba Recordings (MR 301124)

== Awards ==
Peres Da Costa was elected a Fellow of the Australian Academy of the Humanities in 2023.

=== ARIA Music Awards ===
The ARIA Music Awards is an annual awards ceremony that recognises excellence, innovation, and achievement across all genres of Australian music. They commenced in 1987.

Year	Nominee / work	Award	Result	Ref.
2008	Bach Sonatas for Violin & Keyboard (with Richard Tognetti & Daniel Yeadon)	Best Classical Album	Won	
