= Partita in A minor for solo flute (Bach) =

Flute partita composed by Johann Sebastian Bach

The Partita in A minor for solo flute, BWV 1013, is a partita in four movements composed by Johann Sebastian Bach. Its date of composition is uncertain, though on the basis of its advanced playing technique, which is more demanding than in the flute part for the Fifth Brandenburg Concerto, for example, it must have been written after 1723. The title, however, is the work of 20th-century editors. The title in the only surviving 18th-century manuscript is "Solo p[our une] flûte traversière par J. S. Bach".

== History ==
The discoverer of the sole surviving manuscript, Karl Straube, believed it to be an autograph and this view was accepted by Alfred Einstein. However, more recently it has been shown that it was made by two copyists. Although their names are unknown, one appears to be identical with the principal scribe of another manuscript, P 267 (containing the violin sonatas and partitas, BWV 1001–1006), which places this part of the copy of the Partita in the first half of the 1720s. The other scribe is the one now known as "Anonymous 5", an employee of Bach who must have accompanied him when Bach moved from Köthen to Leipzig in 1723. This scribe is known from authentically dated copies of the Cantatas BWV 186 (11 July 1723) and BWV 154 (9 January 1724). On the basis of watermarks and textual criticism, the greater part of the manuscript was probably copied in Leipzig in 1723–1724, while the copyist of the first five lines of the Partita suggest it may have been begun slightly earlier, between 1722 and 1723 in Köthen.

== Movements ==
Partita in A Minor (BWV 1013)
Performed by Alex Murray

Partita for Solo Flute - 1. Allemande
Performed on a traverso by Alex Murray

Partita for Solo Flute - 2. Courente
Performed on a traverso by Alex Murray

Partita for Solo Flute - 3. Sarabande
Performed on a traverso by Alex Murray

Partita for Solo Flute - 4. Bourrée
Performed on a traverso by Alex Murray

Partita for Solo Flute - 1. Allemande
Performed on a modern flute by Scott Goff

Partita for Solo Flute - 2. Courente
Performed on a modern flute by Scott Goff

Partita for Solo Flute - 3. Sarabande
Performed on a modern flute by Scott Goff

Partita for Solo Flute - 4. Bourrée
Performed on a modern flute by Scott Goff

The movements of the Partita are marked:

- Allemande
- Corrente
- Sarabande
- Bourrée angloise
