= List of fugal works by Johann Sebastian Bach =

This is a list of fugal works by Johann Sebastian Bach, defined here as the fugues, fughettas, and canons, as well as other works containing fugal expositions but not denoted as fugues, such as some choral sections of the Mass in B minor, the St Matthew Passion, the St John Passion, and the cantatas.

This sub-list of the complete list of compositions by Johann Sebastian Bach is intended to facilitate the study of Bach's counterpoint techniques. Each work cited in this list will be annotated with the fugal subject(s) and any countersubjects in musical notation.

== Cantata fugues ==
- BWV 6.1 – Choir Fugue, middle section: “Bleib bei uns, denn es will Abend werden”
- BWV 17.1 – Sinfonia and Fugue: “Wer Dank opfert, der preiset mich”
- BWV 21.2 – Choir Fugue: “Ich hatte viel Bekümmernis in meinem Herzen”
- BWV 21.6 – Preludium and permutation Fugue: “Was betrübst du dich, meine Seele”
- BWV 21.11 – Preludium and permutation Fugue: “Das Lamm, das erwürget ist”
- BWV 22.1 – Preludium and Fugue: “Sie aber vernahmen der keines”
- BWV 25.1 – Double Fugue: "Es ist nichts Gesundes an meinem Leibe"
- BWV 31.2 – Double Fugue: “Der Himmel lacht! Die Erde jubilieret”
- BWV 39.1 – Choir Fugue: “Brich dem Hungrigen dein Brot”
- BWV 45.1 – Preludium (3 Fughettas) bar 1–37 Fugue bar 54–77 Fugue bar 78–126 Preludium (3 Fughettas) bar 169–186: “Es ist dir gesagt, Mensch, was gut ist”
- BWV 46.1 – Preludium and Fugue: “Schauet doch und sheet”
- BWV 47.1 – Double Fugue: “Wer sich selbst erhöhet”
- BWV 50.1 – Permutation Fugue: “Nun ist das Heil und die Kraft”
- BWV 54.3 – Aria Double Fugue: “Wer Sünde tut, der ist vom Teufel”
- BWV 63.1 – “Denn der Strahl, so da einbricht” bars 132 –159
- BWV 63.7 – Two Double Fugues: Höchster, schau in Gnaden an””
- BWV 64.1 – Choir Fugue: “Sehet, welch eine Liebe hat uns der Vater erzeiget”
- BWV 65.1 – Choir Triple Fugue: “Sie werden aus Saba alle kommen”
- BWV 67.1 – Sinfonia and Double Choir Fugue: “Halt im Gedächtnis Jesum Christ”
- BWV 68.5 – Double Choir Fugue: “Wer an ihn gläubet”
- BWV 69.1 – Double Fugue: “Lobe den Herrn, meine Seele”
- BWV 71.3 – Choir triple permutation Fugue: “Dein Alter sei wie deine Jugend”
- BWV 75.1 – Preludium and Double Fugue: “Die Elenden sollen essen”
- BWV 76.1 – Preludium and Fugue: “Die Himmel erzählen die Ehre Gottes”
- BWV 79.1 – Fugue: “Gott der Herr ist Sonn und Schild”
- BWV 102.1 – Sinfonia and Choir Fugue: “Sie haben ein härter Angesicht”
- BWV 103.1 – Sinfonia and Double choir Fugue: “Ihr werdet weinen und heulen”
- BWV 104.1 – Choir: “Du Hirte Israel, höre”
- BWV 105.1 – Preludium and permutation Fugue: “Herr, gehe nicht ins Gericht mit deinem Knecht” begins at m.47
- BWV 106.2a2 – Fugue: “In ihm leben, weben und sind wir”
- BWV 106.2d – Fugue stile antico: “Du mußt sterben!”
- BWV 106.4b – Double Fugue: “Durch Jesum Christum, amen”
- BWV 108.4 – Triple Choir Fugue: “Wenn aber jener, der Geist der Wahrheit”
- BWV 110.1 – Grave Fugue (BWV 1069) Grave: “Unser Mund sei voll Lachens”
- BWV 119.1 – Fugue: “Preise, Jerusalem, den Herrn”
- BWV 119.7 – Fugue: “Der Herr hat Guts an uns getan”
- BWV 131.1 – Choir Fugue: “Aus der Tiefen rufe ich, Herr, zu dir”
- BWV 131.3 – Preludium and Choir Fugue: “Ich harre des Herrn, meine Seele harret”
- BWV 131.5 – Motet and Triple Fugue: “Israel, hoffe auf den Herrn”
- BWV 136.1 – Two Choir Fugues: “Erforsche mich, Gott”
- BWV 144.1 – Fugue: “Nimm, was dein ist, und gehe hin”
- BWV 147.1 – Sinfonia and Fugue: “Herz und Mund und Tat und Leben”
- BWV 148.1 – Double Choir Fugue: “Bringet dem Herrn Ehre seines Namens”
- BWV 150.2 – 3 Fugato's and Choir Fugue: “Nach dir, Herr, verlanget mich”
- BWV 150.4 – 1 Fugato and 1 Fugue: “Leite mich in deiner Wahrheit”
- BWV 150.6 – Preludium and Fugue: “Meine Augen sehen stets zu dem Herrn”
- BWV 152.1 – Permutation Fugue (BWV 536 Organ)
- BWV 165.1 – Fugue: “O heilges Geist- und Wasserbad”
- BWV 171.1 – Choir Fugue: “Gott, wie dein Name”
- BWV 176.1 – Choir Fugue: “Es ist ein trotzig und verzagt Ding”
- BWV 179.1 – Motet mirror Double Fugue stile antico: “Siehe zu, daß deine Gottesfurcht nicht Heuchelei sei”
- BWV 181.5 – Double Fugue: “Laß, Höchster, uns zu allen Zeiten”
- BWV 182.2 – Choir Fugue: “Himmelskönig, sei willkommen”
- BWV 186.1 – Choir Fugue: “Ärgre dich, o Seele, nicht”
- BWV 187.1 – Sinfonia and Choir Fugue: “Es wartet alles auf dich”
- BWV 191.1 – Double permutation Fugue: “Gloria in excelsis Deo”
- BWV 191.3 – Choir Fugue: “Sicut erat in principio”
- BWV 195.1 – Preludium and Fugue: “Dem Gerechten muß das Licht”
- BWV 196.2 – Choir Fugue: “Der Herr denket an uns und segnet uns”
- BWV 198.7 – Choir Fugue stile antico: “An dir, du Vorbild großer Frauen”
- BWV 213.7 – Fugue: “Auf meinen Flügeln sollst du schweben”

== Motets ==
- BWV 225.1 – Fugue: “Singet dem Herrn ein neues Lied”
- BWV 225.3 – Fugue: “Lobet den Herrn in seinen Taten”
- BWV 226.1a – Fugue: “Der Geist hilft unser Schwachheit auf”
- BWV 226.1b – Double Fugue: “Der aber die Herzen forschet”
- BWV 227.2 – Fugue: “Die nicht nach dem Fleische wandeln
- BWV 227.6 – Double Fugue: ”Ihr aber seid nicht fleischlich sondern geistlich”
- BWV 230.1 – Double Fugue + Simultaneous Fugue + Fugue: “Lobet den Herrn, alle Heiden"
- BWV Anh.160.1 – Fugue: “Jauchzet dem Herrn, alle Welt”

== Liturgal works in Latin ==
- BWV 232 – Mass in B minor: Credo in unum deum, Confiteor unum baptisma, etc.
- BWV 233.6 – Double Choir Fugue: “Cum Sancto Spiritu”
- BWV 235.1 – Double Fugue: “Kyrie eleison”
- BWV 236.1 – Missa: “Kyrie eleison”
- BWV 236.2 – Missa: ”Gloria in excelsis Deo”
- BWV 236.6 – Missa: “Cum Sancto Spiritu”
- BWV 243.7 – Choir Fugue: “Fecit potentiam in bracchio suo”

== Quodlibet ==
- BWV 524 – "Ist doch der Backtrog" & "Ei, was ist das vor eine schöne Fuge!" Hochzeits-Quodlibet

== Organ fugues ==
- BWV 531 – Prelude and Fugue in C major
- BWV 532 – Prelude and Fugue in D major
- BWV 532a – Fugue in D major (alternative version of BWV 532)
- BWV 533 – Prelude and Fugue in E minor
- BWV 534 – Prelude and Fugue in F minor
- BWV 535 – Prelude and Fugue in G minor
- BWV 535a – Prelude and Fugue in G minor (alternative, simplified version of BWV 535)
- BWV 536 – Prelude and Fugue in A major
- BWV 536a – Prelude and Fugue in A major (alternative version of BWV 536 based on the original manuscript)
- BWV 537 – Fantasia (Prelude) and Fugue in C minor
- BWV 538 – Toccata and Fugue in D minor ("Dorian")
- BWV 539 – Prelude and Fugue in D minor
- BWV 539a – Fugue in D minor (see BWV 1000 for the lute arrangement, movement 2 of BWV 1001 for the violin arrangement)
- BWV 540 – Toccata and Fugue in F major
- BWV 541 – Prelude and Fugue in G major
- BWV 542 – Fantasia and Fugue "Grand" in G minor
- BWV 542a – Fugue in G minor (alternative version of the fugue from BWV 542)
- BWV 543 – Prelude and Fugue in A minor
- BWV 544 – Prelude and Fugue in B minor
- BWV 545 – Prelude and Fugue in C major
- BWV 545a – Prelude and Fugue in C major (alternative version of BWV 545)
- BWV 545b – Prelude, Trio and Fugue in B♭ major (alternative version of BWV 545)
- BWV 546 – Prelude and Fugue in C minor
- BWV 547 – Prelude and Fugue in C major "9/8"
- BWV 548 – Prelude and Fugue in E minor "Wedge"
- BWV 549 – Prelude and Fugue in C minor
- BWV 550 – Prelude and Fugue in G major
- BWV 551 – Prelude and Fugue in A minor
- BWV 552 – Prelude and Fugue in E♭ major "St. Anne" (published in Clavier-Übung III)
- Eight Short Preludes and Fugues (553–560)
  - BWV 553 – Short Prelude and Fugue in C major (spurious, possibly by Johann Tobias Krebs)
  - BWV 554 – Short Prelude and Fugue in D minor (spurious, possibly by Johann Tobias Krebs)
  - BWV 555 – Short Prelude and Fugue in E minor (spurious, possibly by Johann Tobias Krebs)
  - BWV 556 – Short Prelude and Fugue in F major (spurious, possibly by Johann Tobias Krebs)
  - BWV 557 – Short Prelude and Fugue in G major (spurious, possibly by Johann Tobias Krebs)
  - BWV 558 – Short Prelude and Fugue in G minor (spurious, possibly by Johann Tobias Krebs)
  - BWV 559 – Short Prelude and Fugue in A minor (spurious, possibly by Johann Tobias Krebs)
  - BWV 560 – Short Prelude and Fugue in B♭ major (spurious, possibly by Johann Tobias Krebs)
- BWV 561 – Fantasia and Fugue in A minor (spurious)
- BWV 562 – Fantasia and Fugue in C minor (fugue unfinished)
- BWV 563 – Fantasia with imitation in B minor (spurious)
- BWV 564 – Toccata, Adagio and Fugue in C major
- BWV 565 – Toccata and Fugue in D minor
- BWV 566 – Toccata and Fugue in E major
- BWV 566a – Toccata in E major (earlier version of BWV 566)
- BWV 567 – Prelude in C major
- BWV 568 – Prelude in G major
- BWV 569 – Prelude in A minor
- BWV 570 – Fantasia in C major
- BWV 571 – Fantasia (Concerto) in G major (spurious)
- BWV 572 – Fantasia in G major
- BWV 573 – Fantasia in C major (incomplete, from the 1722 Notebook for Anna Magdalena Bach)
- BWV 574 – Fugue in C minor
- BWV 574a – Fugue in C minor (alternative version of BWV 574)
- BWV 575 – Fugue in C minor
- BWV 576 – Fugue in G major
- BWV 577 – Fugue in G major "à la Gigue" (spurious)
- BWV 578 – Fugue in G minor "Little"
- BWV 579 – Fugue on a theme by Arcangelo Corelli (from Op. 3, No. 4); in B Minor
- BWV 580 – Fugue in D major (spurious)
- BWV 581 – Fugue in G major (not by Bach, composed by Gottfried August Homilius)
- BWV 581a – Fugue in G major (spurious)
- BWV 582 – Passacaglia and Fugue in C minor
- BWV 668 – Chorale Quadruple Fugue: ”Vor deinen Thron tret' ich hiermit” Great Eighteen Chorale Preludes
- BWV 677 – Chorale Double Fughetta: “Allein Gott in der Höh’sei Ehr” Clavierübung III
- BWV 679 – Chorale Fughetta: “Diess sind die heil’gen zehn Gebot” Clavierübung III
- BWV 681 – Chorale Fughetta: “Wir glauben all’an einen Gott” Clavierübung III
- BWV 685 – Chorale Fugue: “Christ, unser Herr, zum Jordan kam” Clavierübung III
- BWV 689 – Chorale Fugue: “Jesus Christus, unser Heiland” Clavierübung III
- BWV 695 – Chorale Fughetta: “Christ lag in Todesbanden” The Kirnberger Collection
- BWV 696 – Chorale Fughetta: “Christum wir sollen loben schon / Was fürchst du Feind, Herodes, sehr” The Kirnberger Collection
- BWV 697 – Chorale Fughetta: “Belobet seist du, Jesu Christ” The Kirnberger Collection
- BWV 698 – Chorale Fughetta: “Herr Christ, der ein’ge Gottes Sohn” The Kirnberger Collection
- BWV 699 – Chorale Fughetta: “Nun komm, der Heiden Heiland” The Kirnberger Collection
- BWV 700 – Chorale Fughetta: “Vom Himmel hoch, da komm’ich her” The Kirnberger Collection
- BWV 701 – Chorale Fughetta: “Vom Himmel hoch, da komm’ich her” The Kirnberger Collection
- BWV 702 – Chorale Fughetta: “Das Jesulein soll doch mein Trost” The Kirnberger Collection
- BWV 703 – Chorale Fughetta: “Gottes Sohn ist kommen” The Kirnberger Collection
- BWV 704 – Chorale Fughetta: “Lob sei dem allmächt’gen Gott” The Kirnberger Collection
- BWV 705 – Motet Fugue: “Dirch Adams Fall ist ganz verderbt” The Kirnberger Collection
- BWV 712 – Chorale Fughettas: “In dich hab’ich gehoffet, Herr” The Kirnberger Collection
- BWV 713 – Chorale Fughettas: “Jesu, Meine Freude” The Kirnberger Collection
- BWV 802 – Duetto I Double Fugue Clavierübung III
- BWV 803 – Duetto II Fugue Clavierübung III
- BWV 804 – Duetto III Fugue Clavierübung III
- BWV 805 – Duetto IV Fugue Clavierübung III
- BWV 1086 – Canon concordia discors
- BWV 1087 – 14 canons on the First Eight Notes of Goldberg Variations Ground

== Keyboard fugues ==
=== English Suites ===
- BWV 808.10 – Gigue Suite No. 3 in G minor
- BWV 810.7 – Gigue Suite No. 5 in E minor
- BWV 811.8 – Gigue Suite No. 6 in D minor

=== French Suites ===
- BWV 812.7 – Gigue Suite No. 1 in D minor
- BWV 815.7 – Gigue Suite No. 4 in E♭ major
- BWV 816.7 – Gigue Suite No. 5 in G major

=== Partitas ===
- BWV 826.1 – Sinfonia Clavier-Übung I No. 2 in C minor
- BWV 826.6 – Capriccio Clavier-Übung I No. 2 in C minor
- BWV 827.7 – Gigue Clavier-Übung I No. 3 in A minor
- BWV 828.1 – Ouverture Clavier-Übung I No. 4 in D major
- BWV 828.7 – Gigue: Double Fugue Clavier-Übung I Partita No. 4 in D major
- BWV 829.7 – Gigue: Double Fugue Clavier-Übung I No. 5 in G major
- BWV 830.1 – Toccata: Prelude – Fugue – Postlude Clavier-Übung I No. 6 in E minor

=== Clavier-Übung II ===
- BWV 831.1 – Ouverture in B minor

=== The Well-Tempered Clavier (BWV 846–893) ===
- BWV 846 – The Well-Tempered Clavier, Book 1: Prelude and Fugue No. 1 in C major
- BWV 846a – Prelude and Fugue in C major (alternative version of BWV 846)
- BWV 847 – The Well-Tempered Clavier, Book 1: Prelude and Fugue No. 2 in C minor
- BWV 848 – The Well-Tempered Clavier, Book 1: Prelude and Fugue No. 3 in C♯ major
- BWV 849 – The Well-Tempered Clavier, Book 1: Prelude and Fugue No. 4 in C♯ minor
- BWV 850 – The Well-Tempered Clavier, Book 1: Prelude and Fugue No. 5 in D major
- BWV 851 – The Well-Tempered Clavier, Book 1: Prelude and Fugue No. 6 in D minor
- BWV 852 – The Well-Tempered Clavier, Book 1: Prelude and Fugue No. 7 in E♭ major
- BWV 853 – The Well-Tempered Clavier, Book 1: Prelude and Fugue No. 8 in E♭ minor
- BWV 854 – The Well-Tempered Clavier, Book 1: Prelude and Fugue No. 9 in E major
- BWV 855 – The Well-Tempered Clavier, Book 1: Prelude and Fugue No. 10 in E minor
- BWV 855a – Prelude and Fugue in E minor (alternative version of BWV 855)
- BWV 856 – The Well-Tempered Clavier, Book 1: Prelude and Fugue No. 11 in F major
- BWV 857 – The Well-Tempered Clavier, Book 1: Prelude and Fugue No. 12 in F minor
- BWV 858 – The Well-Tempered Clavier, Book 1: Prelude and Fugue No. 13 in F♯ major
- BWV 859 – The Well-Tempered Clavier, Book 1: Prelude and Fugue No. 14 in F♯ minor
- BWV 860 – The Well-Tempered Clavier, Book 1: Prelude and Fugue No. 15 in G major
- BWV 861 – The Well-Tempered Clavier, Book 1: Prelude and Fugue No. 16 in G minor
- BWV 862 – The Well-Tempered Clavier, Book 1: Prelude and Fugue No. 17 in A♭ major
- BWV 863 – The Well-Tempered Clavier, Book 1: Prelude and Fugue No. 18 in G♯ minor
- BWV 864 – The Well-Tempered Clavier, Book 1: Prelude and Fugue No. 19 in A major
- BWV 865 – The Well-Tempered Clavier, Book 1: Prelude and Fugue No. 20 in A minor
- BWV 866 – The Well-Tempered Clavier, Book 1: Prelude and Fugue No. 21 in B♭ major
- BWV 867 – The Well-Tempered Clavier, Book 1: Prelude and Fugue No. 22 in B♭ minor
- BWV 868 – The Well-Tempered Clavier, Book 1: Prelude and Fugue No. 23 in B major
- BWV 869 – The Well-Tempered Clavier, Book 1: Prelude and Fugue No. 24 in B minor
- BWV 870 – The Well-Tempered Clavier, Book 2: Prelude and Fugue No. 1 in C major
- BWV 870a – Prelude and Fugue in C major (alternative version of BWV 870)
- BWV 870b – Prelude in C major (alternative version of BWV 870)
- BWV 871 – The Well-Tempered Clavier, Book 2: Prelude and Fugue No. 2 in C minor
- BWV 872 – The Well-Tempered Clavier, Book 2: Prelude and Fugue No. 3 in C♯ major
- BWV 872a – Prelude and Fugue in C♯ major (alternative version of BWV 872)
- BWV 873 – The Well-Tempered Clavier, Book 2: Prelude and Fugue No. 4 in C♯ minor
- BWV 874 – The Well-Tempered Clavier, Book 2: Prelude and Fugue No. 5 in D major
- BWV 875 – The Well-Tempered Clavier, Book 2: Prelude and Fugue No. 6 in D minor
- BWV 875a – Prelude in D minor (alternative version of BWV 875)
- BWV 876 – The Well-Tempered Clavier, Book 2: Prelude and Fugue No. 7 in E♭ major
- BWV 877 – The Well-Tempered Clavier, Book 2: Prelude and Fugue No. 8 in D♯ minor
- BWV 878 – The Well-Tempered Clavier, Book 2: Prelude and Fugue No. 9 in E major
- BWV 879 – The Well-Tempered Clavier, Book 2: Prelude and Fugue No. 10 in E minor
- BWV 880 – The Well-Tempered Clavier, Book 2: Prelude and Fugue No. 11 in F major
- BWV 881 – The Well-Tempered Clavier, Book 2: Prelude and Fugue No. 12 in F minor
- BWV 882 – The Well-Tempered Clavier, Book 2: Prelude and Fugue No. 13 in F♯ major
- BWV 883 – The Well-Tempered Clavier, Book 2: Prelude and Fugue No. 14 in F♯ minor
- BWV 884 – The Well-Tempered Clavier, Book 2: Prelude and Fugue No. 15 in G major
- BWV 885 – The Well-Tempered Clavier, Book 2: Prelude and Fugue No. 16 in G minor
- BWV 886 – The Well-Tempered Clavier, Book 2: Prelude and Fugue No. 17 in A♭ major
- BWV 887 – The Well-Tempered Clavier, Book 2: Prelude and Fugue No. 18 in G♯ minor
- BWV 888 – The Well-Tempered Clavier, Book 2: Prelude and Fugue No. 19 in A major
- BWV 889 – The Well-Tempered Clavier, Book 2: Prelude and Fugue No. 20 in A minor
- BWV 890 – The Well-Tempered Clavier, Book 2: Prelude and Fugue No. 21 in B♭ major
- BWV 891 – The Well-Tempered Clavier, Book 2: Prelude and Fugue No. 22 in B♭ minor
- BWV 892 – The Well-Tempered Clavier, Book 2: Prelude and Fugue No. 23 in B major
- BWV 893 – The Well-Tempered Clavier, Book 2: Prelude and Fugue No. 24 in B minor

=== Preludes and fugues, toccatas and fantasias (BWV 894–923) ===
- BWV 894 – Prelude and Fugue in A minor
- BWV 895 – Prelude and Fugue in A minor
- BWV 896 – Prelude and Fugue in A major
- BWV 897 – Prelude and Fugue in A minor (spurious)
- BWV 898 – Prelude and Fugue in B♭ major on the name B-A-C-H (doubtful)
- BWV 899 – Prelude and Fughetta in D minor (doubtful)
- BWV 900 – Prelude and Fughetta in E minor
- BWV 901 – Prelude and Fughetta in F major
- BWV 902 – Prelude and Fughetta in G major
- BWV 902a – Prelude in G major (alternative version of BWV 902)
- BWV 903 – Chromatic Fantasia and Fugue in D minor
- BWV 903a – Chromatic Fantasia in D minor (alternative version of BWV 903)
- BWV 904 – Fantasia and Fugue in A minor
- BWV 905 – Fantasia and Fugue in D minor
- BWV 906 – Fantasia and Fugue in C minor (Fugue unfinished)
- BWV 907 – Fantasia and Fughetta in B♭ major
- BWV 908 – Fantasia and Fughetta in D major
- BWV 909 – Concerto and fugue in C minor
- BWV 910 – Toccata in F♯ minor
- BWV 911 – Toccata in C minor
- BWV 912 – Toccata in D major
- BWV 913 – Toccata in D minor
- BWV 914 – Toccata in E minor
- BWV 915 – Toccata in G minor
- BWV 916 – Toccata in G major

=== Fugues and fughettas (BWV 944–962) ===
- BWV 944 – Fugue in A minor
- BWV 945 – Fugue in E minor (spurious)
- BWV 946 – Fugue in C major
- BWV 947 – Fugue in A minor
- BWV 948 – Fugue in D minor
- BWV 949 – Fugue in A major
- BWV 950 – Fugue in A major on a theme by Tomaso Albinoni
- BWV 951 – Fugue in B minor on a theme by Tomaso Albinoni
- BWV 951a – Fugue in B minor (alternative version of BWV 951)
- BWV 952 – Fugue in C major
- BWV 953 – Fugue in C major
- BWV 954 – Fugue in B♭ major on a theme by Johann Adam Reincken
- BWV 955 – Fugue in B♭ major
- BWV 956 – Fugue in E minor
- BWV 957 – Fugue in G major
- BWV 958 – Fugue in A minor
- BWV 959 – Fugue in A minor
- BWV 960 – Fugue in E minor
- BWV 961 – Fughetta in C minor
- BWV 962 – Fughetta in E minor

== Lute fugues ==
- BWV 995.1 – Präludium – Très Vite Lute suite in G minor, a transcription of Cello suite No. 5 BWV 1011
- BWV 997 – Lute Suite No. 2 in C minor (Fuge)
- BWV 998 – Prelude, Fugue and Allegro in E♭ major
- BWV 1000 – Fugue in G minor

== Concerto movements ==
- BWV 1047 – Brandenburg Concerto No. 2 in F major: III. Allegro assai
- BWV 1050 – Brandenburg Concerto No. 5 in D Major: III. Allegro
- BWV 1061 – Concerto for 2 harpsichords and strings in C major: III. Fuga

== Sonata movements ==
=== Sonatas and partitas for solo violin (BWV 1001–1006) ===
- BWV 1001 – Sonata No. 1 in G minor: II. Fuga (Allegro) – Transcribed for organ as BWV 539 and for lute as BWV 1000
- BWV 1003 – Sonata No. 2 in A minor: II. Fuga – Transcribed for harpsichord as BWV 964
- BWV 1005 – Sonata No. 3 in C major: II. Fuga (Alla breve)

=== Sonatas for violin and harpsichord (BWV 1014–1019) ===
- BWV 1014 – Sonata No. 1 in B minor: II. Allegro; IV. Allegro
- BWV 1015 – Sonata No. 2 in A major: II. Allegro assai; IV. Presto
- BWV 1016 – Sonata No. 3 in E major: II. Allegro; IV. Allegro
- BWV 1017 – Sonata No. 4 in C minor: II. Allegro; IV. Allegro
- BWV 1018 – Sonata No. 5 in F minor: II. Allegro; IV. Vivace
- BWV 1019 – Sonata No. 6 in G major: V. Allegro

=== Other sonatas ===
- BWV 965 – Sonata in A minor: II. Fugue
- BWV 966 – Sonata in C major: II. Fugue
- BWV 1021 – Sonata in G major: IV. Presto

== Cello Suites ==
- BWV 1011 Prelude Suite No. 5 in C minor, in French Overture AB form, the B part is a single-line Fugue

== Canons and fugal works in the last two chapters of the Bach-Werke-Verzeichnis (1998) ==
Legend to the table
column		content
1	BWV	Bach-Werke-Verzeichnis (lit. 'Bach-works-catalogue'; BWV) numbers. Anhang (Annex; Anh.) numbers are indicated as follows: preceded by I: in Anh. I (lost works) of BWV^{1} (1950 first edition of the BWV); preceded by II: in Anh. II (doubtful works) of BWV^{1}; preceded by III: in Anh. III (spurious works) of BWV^{1}; preceded by N: new Anh. numbers in BWV^{2} (1990) and/or BWV^{2a} (1998)
2	^{2a}	Section in which the composition appears in BWV^{2a}: Chapters of the main catalogue indicated by Arabic numerals (1-13); Anh. sections indicated by Roman numerals (I–III); Reconstructions published in the NBE indicated by "R"
3	Date	Date associated with the completion of the listed version of the composition. Exact dates (e.g. for most cantatas) usually indicate the assumed date of first (public) performance. When the date is followed by an abbreviation in brackets (e.g. JSB for Johann Sebastian Bach) it indicates the date of that person's involvement with the composition as composer, scribe or publisher.
4	Name	Name of the composition: if the composition is known by a German incipit, that German name is preceded by the composition type (e.g. cantata, chorale prelude, motet, ...)
5	Key	Key of the composition
6	Scoring	See scoring table below for the abbreviations used in this column
7	BG	Bach Gesellschaft-Ausgabe (BG edition; BGA): numbers before the colon indicate the volume in that edition. After the colon an Arabic numeral indicates the page number where the score of the composition begins, while a Roman numeral indicates a description of the composition in the Vorwort (Preface) of the volume.
8	NBE	New Bach Edition (German: Neue Bach-Ausgabe, NBA): Roman numerals for the series, followed by a slash, and the volume number in Arabic numerals. A page number, after a colon, refers to the "Score" part of the volume. Without such page number, the composition is only described in the "Critical Commentary" part of the volume. The volumes group Bach's compositions by genre: 1. Cantatas (Vol. 1–34: church cantatas grouped by occasion; Vol. 35–40: secular cantatas; Vol. 41: Varia); 2. Masses, Passions, Oratorios (12 volumes); 3. Motets, Chorales, Lieder (4 volumes); 4. Organ Works (11 volumes); 5. Keyboard and Lute Works (14 volumes); 6. Chamber Music (5 volumes); 7. Orchestral Works (7 volumes); 8. Canons, Musical Offering, Art of Fugue (3 volumes); 9. Addenda (approximately 7 volumes)
9	Additional info	may include: "after" – indicating a model for the composition; "by" – indicating the composer of the composition (if different from Johann Sebastian Bach); "in" – indicating the oldest known source for the composition; "pasticcio" – indicating a composition with parts of different origin; "see" – composition renumbered in a later edition of the BWV; "text" – by text author, or, in source; Provenance of standard texts and tunes, such as Lutheran hymns and their chorale melodies, Latin liturgical texts (e.g. Magnificat) and common tunes (e.g. Folia), are not usually indicated in this column. For an overview of such resources used by Bach, see individual composition articles, and overviews in, e.g., Chorale cantata (Bach)#Bach's chorale cantatas, List of chorale harmonisations by Johann Sebastian Bach#Chorale harmonisations in various collections and List of organ compositions by Johann Sebastian Bach#Chorale Preludes.
10	BD	Bach Digital Work page

Legend for abbreviations in "Scoring" column
Voices (see also SATB)
a	A	b	B	s	S	t	T	v			V	
alto (solo part)	alto (choir part)	bass (solo part)	bass (choir part)	soprano (solo part)	soprano (choir part)	tenor (solo part)	tenor (choir part)	voice (includes parts for unspecified voices or instruments as in some canons)			vocal music for unspecified voice type	
Winds and battery (bold = soloist)
Bas	Bel	Cnt	Fl	Hn	Ob	Oba	Odc	Tai	Tbn	Tdt	Tmp	Tr
bassoon (can be part of Bc, see below)	bell(s) (musical bells)	cornett, cornettino	flute (traverso, flauto dolce, piccolo, flauto basso)	natural horn, corno da caccia, corno da tirarsi, lituo	oboe	oboe d'amore	oboe da caccia	taille	trombone	tromba da tirarsi	timpani	tromba (natural trumpet, clarino trumpet)
Strings and keyboard (bold = soloist)
Bc		Hc	Kb	Lu	Lw	Org	Str	Va	Vc	Vdg	Vl	Vne
basso continuo: Vdg, Hc, Vc, Bas, Org, Vne and/or Lu		harpsichord	keyboard (Hc, Lw, Org or clavichord)	lute, theorbo	Lautenwerck (lute-harpsichord)	organ (/man. = manualiter, without pedals)	strings: Vl I, Vl II and Va	viola(s), viola d'amore, violetta	violoncello, violoncello piccolo	viola da gamba	violin(s), violino piccolo	violone, violone grosso

Background colours
Colour	Meaning
green	extant or clearly documented partial or complete manuscript (copy) by Bach and/or first edition under Bach's supervision
yellow	extant or clearly documented manuscript (copy) or print edition, in whole or in part, by close relative, i.e. brother (J. Christoph), wife (A. M.), son (W. F. / C. P. E. / J. C. F. / J. Christian) or son-in-law (Altnickol)
orange-brown	extant or clearly documented manuscript (copy) by close friend and/or pupil (Kellner, Krebs, Kirnberger, Walther, ...), or distant family member

Canons and fugal works in Chapters 12 and 13 of BWV^{2a}
BWV	^{2a}	Date	Name	Key	Scoring	BG	NBE	Additional info	BD
**12.**	Canons (see also: List of canons by Johann Sebastian Bach)								Up ↑
1072	12.		Canon trias harmonica a 8	D maj.	8V	45^{1}: 131	VIII/1: 3, 6		01258
1073	12.	1713-08-02	Canon â 4. Voc: perpetuus	A min.	4V	45^{1}: 132	VIII/1: 3	in US-CAh bMS Eng 870 (35b)	01259
1074	12.	1727	Canon a 4 (for Ludwig Friedrich Hudemann)	A min.	4V	45^{1}: 134	VIII/1: 3		01260
1075	12.	1734-01-10	Canon a 2. perpetuus	D maj.	2V		VIII/1: 3		01261
1076	12.	1746	Canon triplex a 6	G maj.	6V	45^{1}: 138	VIII/1: 3	after BWV 1087/13	01262
1077	12.	1747-10-15	Canone doppio sopr' il soggetto (dedicated to Johann Fulde)	G maj.	4V Bc		VIII/1: 4 IX/2: 81	after BWV 1087/11	01263
1078	12.	1749-03-01	Canon Fa Mi, et Mi Fa est Tota Musica, a.k.a. Canon super Fa Mi, a 7. post Tempus Musicum	F maj.	7V Bc	45^{1}: 136	VIII/1: 4	in SBB P 611	01264
1086	12.	1750?	Canon Concordia discors	D maj.	2V		VIII/1: 4 III/1: VIII	in SLB Dresden R 291^{s}	01272
1087	12.	1747/1748 or earlier	14 Canons on the first eight notes of the Goldberg ground	G maj.	6V		V/2: 119	after BWV 988/1; /11 → BWV 1077; /13 → 1076; in BN Paris Ms. 17669, Bl. 18v	01273
**13.**	Musical Offering, Art of the Fugue (see also: List of late contrapuntal works by Johann Sebastian Bach)								Up ↑
1079	13.	1747-07-07	Musical Offering		Kb Fl 2Vl Bc	31^{2}	VIII/1: 46		01265
1080.1	13.	1742–1749	The Art of Fugue (autograph)		Hc (?)	25^{1}	VIII/2.1	→ BWV 1080.2	01266
1080.2	13.	c. 1747–1748	The Art of Fugue (print version)		Hc (?)	47	VIII/2.2	after BWV 1080.1	11581

=== Canons (BWV 1072–1078) ===
- BWV 1072 – Canon trias harmonica a 8
- BWV 1073 – Canon a 4 perpetuus
- BWV 1074 – Canon a 4
- BWV 1075 – Canon a 2 perpetuus
- BWV 1076 – Canon triplex a 6
- BWV 1077 – Canone doppio sopr'il soggetto
- BWV 1078 – Canon super fa mi a 7 post tempus musicum
- Later additions to the BWV catalogue:
  - BWV 1086 – Canon concordia discors
  - BWV 1087 – 14 canons on the First Eight Notes of Goldberg Variations Ground (discovered 1974)

=== Late contrapuntal works (BWV 1079–1080) ===
- BWV 1079 – The Musical Offering (Musikalisches Opfer)
- BWV 1080 – The Art of Fugue (Die Kunst der Fuge)

== Doubtful fugues ==
- BWV 131a – Fugue in G minor, BWV 131a for organ. Doubtful arrangement of a choral fugue from BWV 131
- BWV 1026 – Fugue in G minor for violin and harpsichord. Once considered spurious, current thinking is that this is an early work by Bach.
