= Zoltán Göncz =

Hungarian composer (born 1958)

Zoltán Göncz (born July 23, 1958, in Budapest) is a Hungarian composer who often applies archaic forms (canon, passacaglia) and complex structures in his compositions.

He graduated from the Ferenc Liszt Academy of Music in 1980. He was music editor at the National Philharmonic Agency between 1983 and 1997, then worked in the same capacity with the musical ensembles of the Hungarian Radio from 1997 to 2008. Since 2008 he has been researcher and lecturer at the Department of Hymnology of John Wesley Theological College in Budapest.

He has dealt intensively with musicology for decades.

== Awards and distinctions ==
For his strenuous work in the field of familiarizing and propagating contemporary Hungarian music he was awarded with the Artisjus-Prize twice (1994, 2006). For his outstanding achievements in international Bach research and the book entitled Bach testamentuma [Bach's Testament] he has been decorated with the Silver Cross of Distinction of the Hungarian Republic in 2009.

== Works and completions ==
- “…i rinoceronti del nero cosmo…” – omaggio a Dino Buzzati – for brass quintet (1985–86)
- Great canon (Canon perpetuus per tonos et semitonium in contrario motu) – for orchestra (1987–88)
- J. S. Bach: Fantasia and Fugue in C minor BWV 562 (completion: 1989) (see external links)
- J. S. Bach: Contrapunctus XIV (Quadruple fugue) from The Art of Fugue (reconstruction and completion: 1990–92) (the score published by Carus-Verlag [CV 18.018] in 2006) (see external links)
- Whirl, Palimpsest, Pentium – 3 algorithmic studies for 2 pianos (1996) (see external links)
- Canon gradus a 12 (per tonos, in contrario motu, per arsin et thesin) ad honorem J. S. – for mixed choir to a poem “Ten stairs” by Sándor Weöres (2005)
- J. S. Bach: O Traurigkeit, o Herzeleid! – chorale prelude (fragment from the Orgelbüchlein – BWV Anhang 200) (completion: 2011) (see external links)
- J. S. Bach: Singet dem Herrn ein neues Lied BWV 190/1 (reconstruction) Early Music Vol. 47/4, November 2019, Online Appendix

== Publications ==
- "The Permutational Matrix in J. S. Bach’s Art of Fugue," Studia Musicologica Vol. 33, 1991, 109–119.
- "Reconstruction of the Final Contrapunctus of The Art of Fugue," International Journal of Musicology Vol. 5, 1997, 25–93. ISBN 3-631-49809-8; Vol. 6, 1998, 103–119. ISBN 3-631-33413-3 (in Hungarian: "A fúga művészete zárócontrapunctusának rekonstrukciója," Bach Tanulmányok 2, 1993)
- Bach testamentuma [Bach's testament], Budapest, Gramofon könyvek, 2009 ISBN 978-963-86157-5-6
- "The Sacred Codes of the Six-Part Ricercar," Bach: Journal of the Riemenschneider Bach Institute Vol. 42/1 (2011), 46–69. (see external links) (in Hungarian: "A hatszólamú ricercar szakrális kódjai," Magyar Zene 2011/1, 17–37.)
- Bach's Testament. On the Philosophical and Theological Background of the Art of Fugue. Contextual Bach Studies 4, Scarecrow Press, 2013 ISBN 978-0-8108-8447-2 (see external links)
- "In search of the lost parts of Bach’s cantata Singet dem Herrn ein neues Lied (BWV190)" Early Music Vol. 47/4, November 2019, 515–532.
- "Two New Possible Models for the ′Confiteor′ of J. S. Bach’s Mass in B Minor" Bach: Journal of the Riemenschneider Bach Institute Vol. 54, No. 1 (2023), 106–125.
- „A “New” J. S. Bach Chorale-Aria? “Sende, Herr, den Segen ein” from Ihr Tore zu Zion BWV 193” Bach: Journal of the Riemenschneider Bach Institute Vol. 56, No. 1 (2025), 94–116.
