= Prelude and Fugue in C minor, BWV 546 =

Organ music piece written by Johann Sebastian Bach

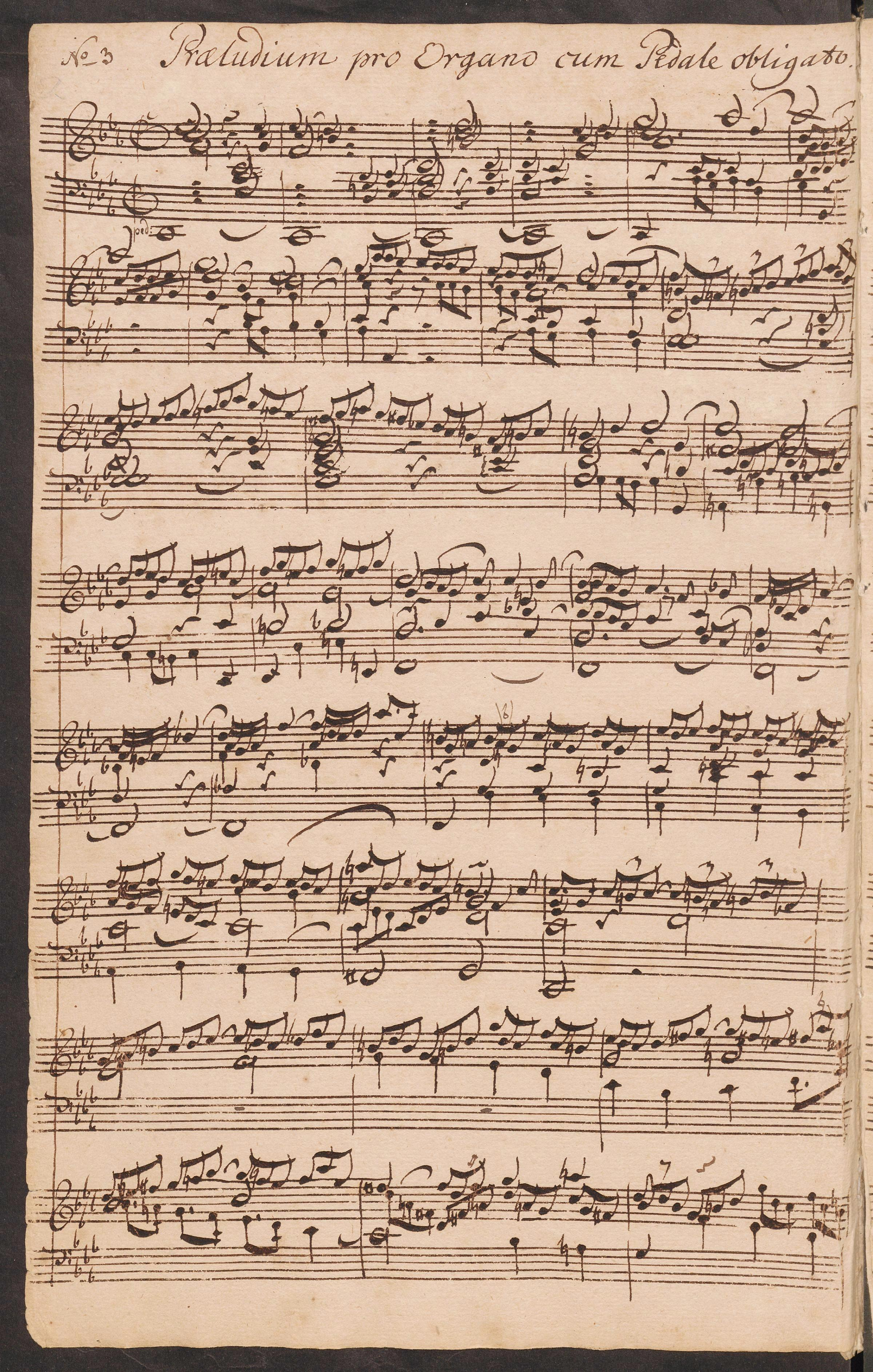
The beginning of the BWV 546 Prelude, in the hand of Johann Peter Kellner.

Prelude and Fugue in C minor, BWV 546, is a piece of organ music written by Johann Sebastian Bach, with the prelude dating around his time in Leipzig (1723–1750), and the fugue dating around his time in Weimar (1708–1717). Like most other organ prelude and fugues of Bach, no autograph score survives, with the oldest known score copied by Johann Peter Kellner, an acquaintance of Bach. The work was played as a postlude for the funeral of Diana, Princess of Wales, the funeral of Prince Philip, Duke of Edinburgh, and the Committal of Queen Elizabeth II by organists Martin Neary and Luke Bond, respectively.

== Prelude ==
The prelude is believed to be the more mature of the two movements due to structural similarities between this movement and the Leipzig organ preludes of BWV 548 and BWV 544, all of which showcase a massive, intricate ritornello construction. Much of the opening theme for this work was subtly arranged and transposed in G minor for the lighter opening chorus of the cantata Wer sich selbst erhöhet, der soll erniedriget werden, BWV 47, which was performed on 13 October 1726 in Leipzig. After the stately initial dialogue, the piece is soon flanked with a flurry of running triplets, intertwined with a looming second theme, with the original one reoccurring only in fragments until its final statement.

== Fugue ==
The alla breve fugue is believed to have been written during Bach's time in Weimar, and was added to the prelude during his time in Leipzig. Some believe the movement may have been partially or fully composed by Kellner.

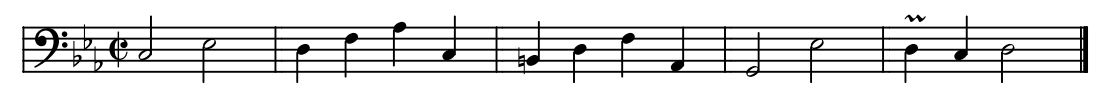
The fugue subject

== Work cited ==
- Williams, Peter (2003), The Organ Music of J. S. Bach (2nd ed.), Cambridge University Press, ISBN 0-521-89115-9
- Jones, Richard D.P. (2013), The Creative Development of Johann Sebastian Bach, Volume II: 1717–1750: Music to Delight the Spirit. Oxford University Press, ISBN 978-0-19-969628-4
