= Fugue in G minor, BWV 1000 =

Composition by Johann Sebastian Bach

The Fugue in G minor is a musical composition, possibly for the lute, written by Johann Sebastian Bach shortly after he moved from Köthen to Leipzig in 1723.

Today the piece is typically played on the guitar.

== Origin ==
Bach extracted the second movement from his Sonata No. 1 in G minor for solo violin, BWV 1001, written in 1720, and rewrote it; it is not clear that it was intended for the lute. No definitive manuscript version exists today, although there is a contemporary copy in tablature, possibly made by Bach's lutenist friend, Christian Weyrauch.

== See also ==
- Prelude in C minor, BWV 999
