= Prelude and Fugue in E minor, BWV 548 =

Organ work by Johann Sebastian Bach

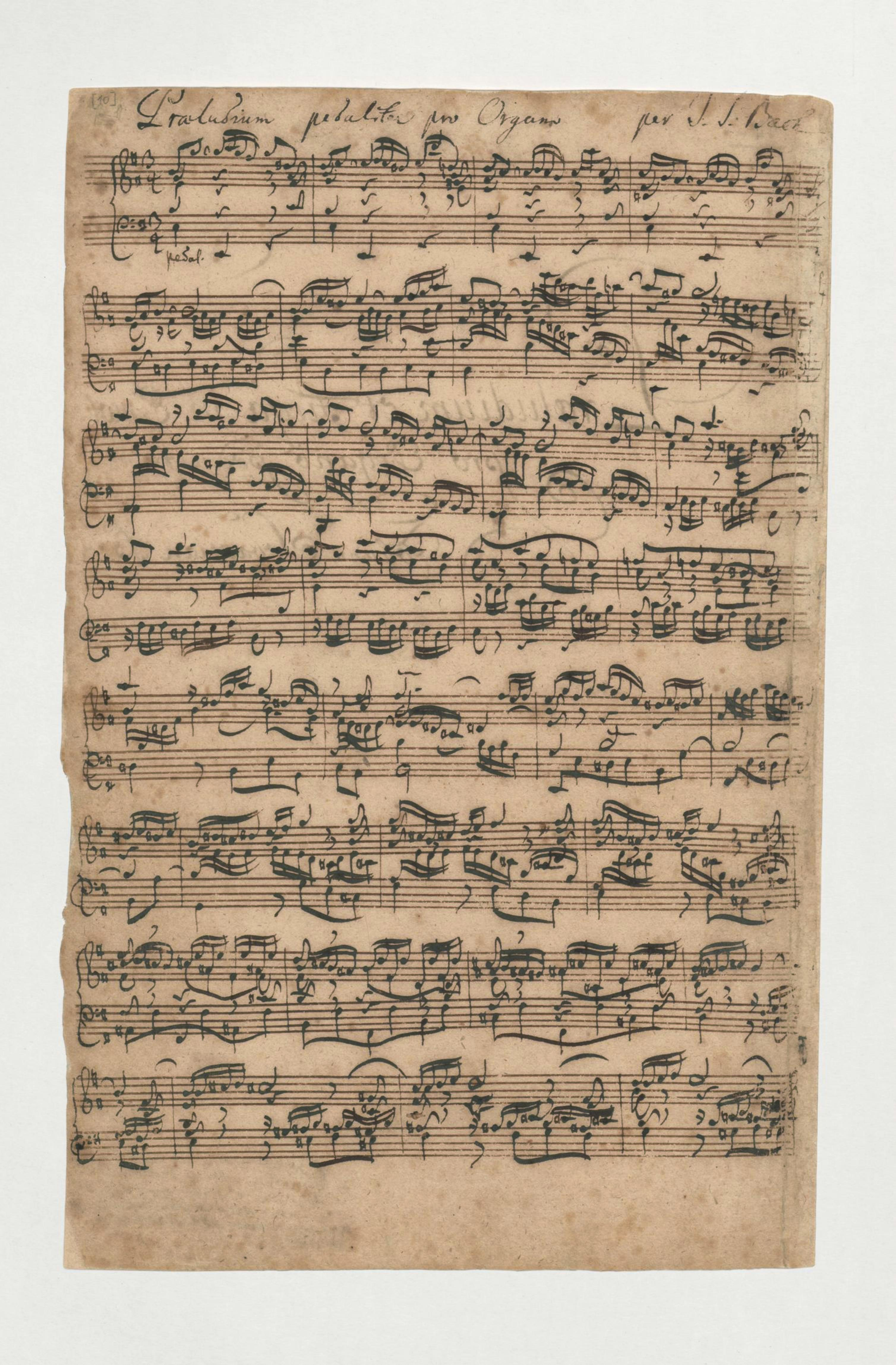
The beginning of the BWV 548 Prelude, in the hand of J.S. Bach.

Prelude and Fugue in E minor, BWV 548 is a piece of organ music written by Johann Sebastian Bach sometime between 1727 and 1736, during his time in Leipzig. The work is sometimes called "The Wedge" due to the chromatic outward motion of the fugue theme. Unlike most other organ preludes and fugues of Bach, the autograph fair copy of the score survives, though the handwriting changes twenty-two measures into the fugue to the hand of Johann Peter Kellner, a likely pupil and acquaintance of Bach who played an important role in the copying of his manuscripts. Because of the work's immense scope, it has been referred to as "a two-movement symphony" for the organ.

== History ==
The autograph manuscript, along with that of the Prelude and Fugue in B minor, BWV 544, which is believed to have been written around the same time, share the same watermark and style of handwriting, which points to a composition period of 1727-1731. It has been suggested by Christoph Wolff that the work was composed for the organ at the University Church in Leipzig.

== Composition ==
=== Prelude ===
The prelude's massive structure is considered to be one of the most intricate in the genre. It bears a concerto-ritornello style similar to other mature organ works, such as the BWV 544 and BWV 546 preludes, with the homophonic opening theme reoccurring between various polyphonic, episodic sequences.

=== Fugue ===
The subtitle of the work, commonly referred to as "The Wedge", refers to the first half of the fugue subject, which opens up as a sort of widening, chromatic wedge around the tonic point. The tradition of descending chromatic fourths in Bach's E minor fugue subjects include the BWV 914 harpsichord Toccata, the BWV 855 Prelude and Fugue from the Well Tempered Clavier, Book 1, as well as the "Un poco Allegro" movement from the BWV 528 Organ Sonata. The fugue, clocking at 231 measures, is among Bach's longest and most elaborate organ fugues. The movement is unique in that it is in a three-part structure, with the third da capo section being a note-for-note reprise of the first. The second section suddenly thrusts the piece into an over-one-hundred measure episode of rapid, toccata-like passages of great virtuosity, with the cascading passagework occasionally giving way to the subject.

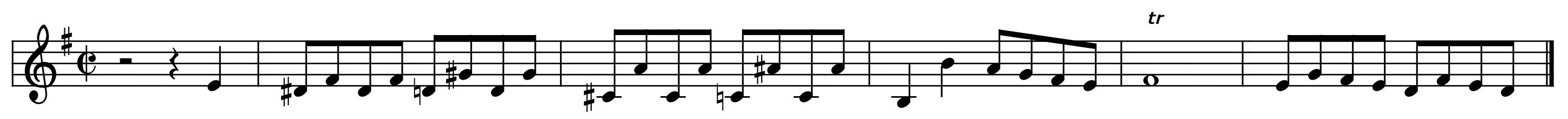
The fugue subject, by the shape of which the composition has acquired its name - "The Wedge"

== Reception ==
Albert Schweitzer described both movements as being "so mighty in design, and have so much harshness blended with their power, that the hearer can only grasp them after several hearings." Philipp Spitta referred to the work as a "two-movement symphony", commenting on the work's "life energy" and the "extreme daring" nature of the fugue subject. Peter Williams attributed the work's "riveting power" to the "easily felt balance between the two movements."

== Arrangements ==
=== Piano Transcriptions ===
The piece has been included in Franz Liszt's transcriptions of Bach's six "Great" organ Preludes and Fugues, BWV 543 - 548, for solo piano (S. 462). The piece was also transcribed by Ivan Karlovitsch Tscherlitzky as well as by Samuil Feinberg

=== Bach Trios Arrangements ===
The piece has been arranged for mandolin, cello and double bass, and performed by Chris Thile, Yo Yo Ma, and Edgar Meyer respectively for their 2017 album "Bach Trios," released by Nonesuch Records.

== Works cited ==
- Williams, Peter (1980), The Organ Music of J. S. Bach: Volume 1, Preludes, Toccatas, Fantasias, Fugues, Sonatas, Concertos and Miscellaneous PiecesCambridge University Press, ISBN 0-521-27078-2
- Williams, Peter (2003), The Organ Music of J. S. Bach (2nd ed.), Cambridge University Press, ISBN 0-521-89115-9
- Jones, Richard D.P. (2013), The Creative Development of Johann Sebastian Bach, Volume II: 1717–1750: Music to Delight the Spirit. Oxford University Press, ISBN 978-0-19-969628-4
- Schweitzer, Albert (1935). J.S. Bach, Vol. 1 London: A.C. & Black
