= The Art of Fugue =

Musical work by Johann Sebastian Bach

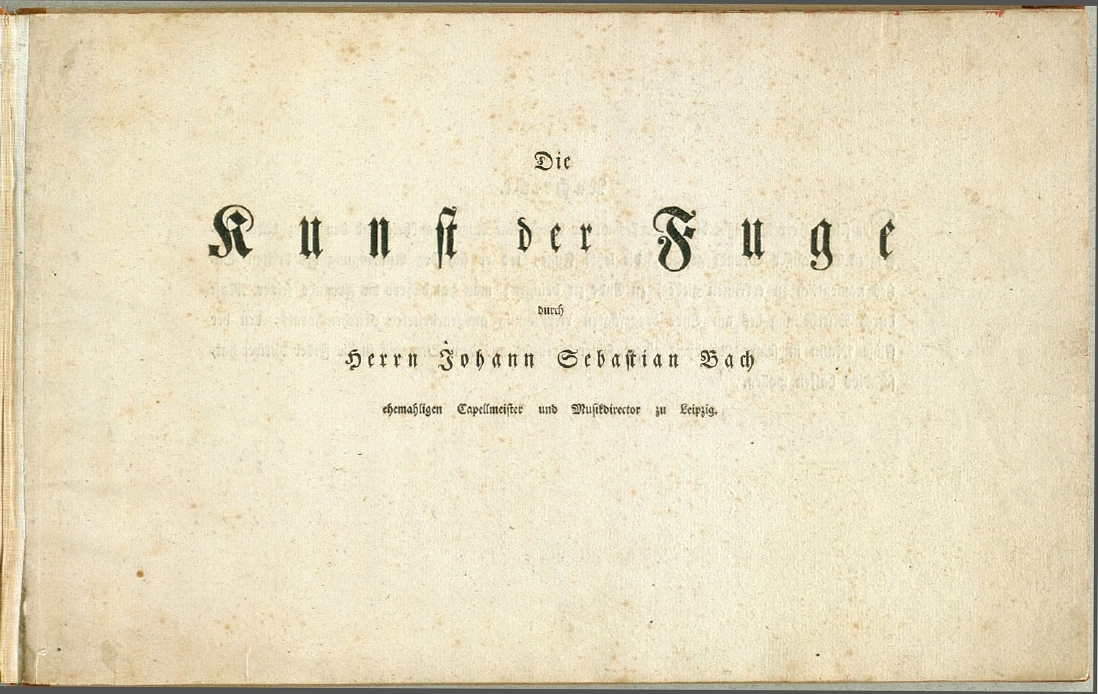
Title page of the first edition, 1751

The Art of Fugue, part 1
(40 minutes)

The Art of Fugue, part 2
(31 minutes)
Performed by David Ezra Okonşar on organ and harpsichord

The Art of Fugue, or The Art of the Fugue (German: Die Kunst der Fuge), BWV 1080, is an incomplete musical work of unspecified instrumentation by Johann Sebastian Bach. Written in the last decade of his life, The Art of Fugue is the culmination of Bach's experimentation with monothematic instrumental works.

This work consists of fourteen fugues and four canons in D minor, each using some variation of a single principal subject, and generally ordered to increase in complexity. "The governing idea of the work", as put by Bach specialist Christoph Wolff, "was an exploration in depth of the contrapuntal possibilities inherent in a single musical subject." The word "contrapunctus" is often used for each fugue.

Beginning to be written around 1740, or perhaps even earlier, but continued only from 1747, The Art of Fugue remained unfinished due to the death of Johann Sebastian Bach in 1750. Despite being incomplete, Carl Philipp Emanuel Bach, the son of Johann Sebastian, had it printed in 1751. This publication was followed by a second, still in an incomplete version, in 1752. However, in both cases the work did not spark public interest, which at this point was already directed towards new musical styles, and it sold few copies.

The collection, which constitutes a veritable essay on the art of counterpoint, systematically explores all the possibilities offered by a simple theme in D minor, elaborated according to different composing techniques like, for example, variation and the mirror inversion of the intervals. Together with The Musical Offering, The Art of Fugue is recognised as one of the most complex and articulated works ever written, and it is universally considered to be among the highest pinnacles ever reached by contrapuntal polyphony in the entire history of music.

== Sources ==
=== Mus. ms. autogr. P 200 ===
The title page of Mus. ms. autogr. P 200, which bears the title Die / Kunst der Fuga / di Sig.o Joh. Seb. Bach. / (in eigenhändiger Partitur)

The earliest extant source of the work is an autograph manuscript possibly written from 1740 to 1746, usually referred to by its call number as Mus. ms. autogr. P 200 in the Berlin State Library. Bearing the title Die / Kunst der Fuga [sic] / di Sig[nore] Joh. Seb. Bach, which was written by Bach's son-in-law Johann Christoph Altnickol, followed by (in eigenhändiger Partitur) written by Georg Poelchau, the autograph contains twelve untitled fugues and two canons arranged in a different order than in the first printed edition, with the absence of Contrapunctus 4, Fuga a 2 clav (two-keyboard version of Contrapunctus 13), Canon alla decima, and Canon alla duodecima.

The autograph manuscript presents the then-untitled Contrapuncti and canons in the following order: [Contrapunctus 1], [Contrapunctus 3], [Contrapunctus 2], [Contrapunctus 5], [Contrapunctus 9], an early version of [Contrapunctus 10], [Contrapunctus 6], [Contrapunctus 7], Canon in Hypodiapason with its two-stave solution Resolutio Canonis (entitled Canon alla Ottava in the first printed edition), [Contrapunctus 8], [Contrapunctus 11], Canon in Hypodiatesseron, al roversio [sic] e per augmentationem, perpetuus presented in two staves and then on one, [Contrapunctus 12] with the inversus form of the fugue written directly below the rectus form, [Contrapunctus 13] with the same rectus–inversus format, and a two-stave Canon al roverscio et per augmentationem—a second version of Canon in Hypodiatesseron.

=== Mus. ms. autogr. P 200, Beilage ===
Bundled with the primary autograph are three supplementary manuscripts, each affixed to a composition that would appear in the first printed edition. Referred to as Mus. ms. autogr. P 200/Beilage 1, Mus. ms. autogr. P 200/Beilage 2, and Mus. ms. autogr. P 200/Beilage 3, they are written under the title ~~Die~~ Kunst / der Fuga / von J.S.B.

Mus. ms. autogr. P 200, Beilage 1 contains a final preparatory revision of the Canon in Hypodiatesseron, under the title Canon p[er] Augmentationem contrario Motu crossed out. The manuscript contains line break and page break information for the engraving process, most of which was transcribed in the first printed edition. Written on the top region of the manuscript is a note written by Johann Christoph Friedrich Bach:

N.B. Der seel. Papa hat auf die Platte diesen Titul stechen lassen, Canon per Augment: in Contrapuncto all octava, er hat es aber wieder ausgestrichen auf der Probe Platte und gesetzet wie forn stehet

N.B. The late father had written on the copper plate the following title, Canon per Augment: in Contrapuncto all octava, but had struck it out again on the proof sheet and restored the title as it was formerly

Mus. ms. autogr. P 200, Beilage 2 contains two-keyboard arrangements of Contrapunctus 13 inversus and rectus, entitled Fuga a 2. Clav: and Alio modo Fuga a 2 Clav. in the first printed edition respectively. Like Beilage 1, the manuscript served as a preparatory edition for the first printed edition.

Mus. ms. autogr. P 200, Beilage 3 contains a fragment of a three-subject fugue, which would be later called Fuga a 3 Soggetti in the first printed edition. Unlike the fugues written in the primary autograph, the Fuga is presented in a two-stave keyboard system, instead of with individual staves for each voice. The fugue abruptly breaks off on the fifth page, specifically on the 239th measure and ends with the note written by Carl Philipp Emanuel Bach: "Ueber dieser Fuge, wo der Nahme BACH im Contrasubject angebracht worden, ist der Verfasser gestorben." ("Upon this fugue, where the name BACH [for which the English notation would be B♭–A–C–B♮] was placed in the countersubject, the author died.") The following page contains a list of errata by Carl Philipp Emanuel Bach for the first printed edition (pages 21–35).

=== First and second printed editions ===
The first printed version was published under the title Die / Kunst der Fuge / durch / Herrn Johann Sebastian Bach / ehemahligen Capellmeister und Musikdirector zu Leipzig in May 1751, slightly less than a year after Bach's death. In addition to changes in the order, notation, and material of pieces which appeared in the autograph, it contained two new fugues, two new canons, and three pieces of ostensibly spurious inclusion. A second edition was published in 1752, but differed only in its addition of a preface by Friedrich Wilhelm Marpurg.

In spite of its revisions, the printed edition of 1751 contained a number of glaring editorial errors. The majority of these may be attributed to Bach's relatively sudden death in the midst of publication. Three pieces were included that do not appear to have been part of Bach's intended order: an unrevised (and thus redundant) version of the second double fugue, Contrapunctus X; a two-keyboard arrangement of the first mirror fugue, Contrapunctus XIII; and an organ chorale prelude on "Vor deinen Thron tret ich hiermit" ("Herewith I come before Thy Throne"), derived from BWV 668a, and noted in the introduction to the edition as a recompense for the work's incompleteness, having purportedly been dictated by Bach on his deathbed.

The anomalous character of the published order and the Unfinished Fugue, have engendered a wide variety of theories which attempt to restore the work to the state originally intended by Bach.

== Structure ==
Contrapunctus 1, principal subject

1, whole contrapunctus

2, principal subject

3, principal subject

4, principal subject

5, principal subject

6, principal subject

8, principal subject

9, principal subject

10, principal subject

11, principal subject

Fuga a 3 Soggetti, motif
MIDI renditions

The Art of Fugue is based on a single subject, which each canon and fugue employs in some variation:

The work divides into seven groups, according to each piece's prevailing contrapuntal device; in both editions, these groups and their respective components are generally ordered to increase in complexity. In the order in which they occur in the printed edition of 1751 (without the aforementioned works of spurious inclusion), the groups, and their components are as follows.

Simple fugues:

- Contrapunctus 1: four-voice fugue on principal subject
- Contrapunctus 2: four-voice fugue on principal subject, accompanied by a 'French' style dotted rhythm
- Contrapunctus 3: four-voice fugue on principal subject in inversion, employing intense chromaticism
- Contrapunctus 4: four-voice fugue on principal subject in inversion, employing counter-subjects

Stretto-fugues (counter-fugues), in which the subject is used simultaneously in regular, inverted, augmented, and diminished forms:

- Contrapunctus 5: has many stretto entries, as do Contrapuncti 6 and 7
- Contrapunctus 6, a 4 in Stylo Francese: adds both forms of the theme in diminution, (halving note lengths), with little rising and descending clusters of semiquavers in one voice answered or punctuated by similar groups in demisemiquavers in another, against sustained notes in the accompanying voices. The dotted rhythm, enhanced by these little rising and descending groups, suggests what is called "French style" in Bach's day, hence the name Stylo Francese.
- Contrapunctus 7, a 4 per Augment[ationem] et Diminut[ionem]: uses augmented (doubling all note lengths) and diminished versions of the main subject and its inversion.

Double and triple fugues, employing two and three subjects respectively:

- Contrapunctus 8, a 3: triple fugue with three subjects, having independent expositions
- Contrapunctus 9, a 4, alla Duodecima: double fugue, with two subjects occurring dependently and in invertible counterpoint at the twelfth
- Contrapunctus 10, a 4, alla Decima: double fugue, with two subjects occurring dependently and in invertible counterpoint at the tenth
- Contrapunctus 11, a 4: triple fugue, employing the three subjects of Contrapunctus 8 in inversion

Mirror fugues, in which a piece is notated once and then with voices and counterpoint completely inverted, without violating contrapuntal rules or musicality:

- Contrapunctus inversus 12 a 4 [forma inversa and recta]
- Contrapunctus inversus 13 a 3 [forma recta and inversa]

Canons, labeled by interval and technique:

- Canon per Augmentationem in Contrario Motu: Canon in which the following voice is both inverted and augmented. The following voice, running at half-speed, eventually lags the first voice by 20 bars, making the canon effect hard to hear. Three versions have appeared in the autograph Mus. ms. autogr. P 200: Canon in Hypodiatesseron, al roversio [sic] e per augmentationem, perpetuus, Canon al roverscio et per augmentationem, and Canon p. Augmentationem contrario Motu, the third of which appears on the second supplemental Beilage.
- Canon alla Ottava: canon in imitation at the octave; titled Canon in Hypodiapason in Mus. ms. autogr. P 200.
- Canon alla Decima [in] Contrapunto alla Terza: canon in imitation at the tenth
- Canon alla Duodecima in Contrapunto alla Quinta: canon in imitation at the twelfth

Alternate variants and arrangements:

- Contra[punctus] a 4: alternate version of the last 22 bars of Contrapunctus 10.
- Fuga a 2 Clav: and Alio modo. Fuga a 2 Clav.: two-keyboard arrangements of Contrapunctus inversus a 3, the forma inversa and recta, respectively.

Incomplete fugue:

- [Contrapunctus 14] Fuga a 3 Soggetti: four-voice triple fugue (not completed by Bach, but likely to have become a quadruple fugue: see below), the third subject of which begins with the BACH motif, B♭–A–C–B♮ ('H' in German letter notation).

== Instrumentation ==
Both editions of the Art of Fugue are written in open score, where each voice is written on its own staff. This has led some to conclude that the Art of Fugue was intended as an intellectual exercise, meant to be studied more than heard. The renowned keyboardist Gustav Leonhardt argued that the Art of Fugue was intended to be played on a keyboard instrument, and specifically the harpsichord. Leonhardt's arguments included the following:

1. It was common practice in the 17th and early 18th centuries to publish keyboard pieces in open score, especially those that are contrapuntally complex. Examples include Frescobaldi's Fiori musicali (1635), Samuel Scheidt's Tabulatura Nova (1624), works by Johann Jakob Froberger (1616–1667), Franz Anton Maichelbeck (1702–1750), and others.
2. The range of none of the ensemble or orchestral instruments of the period corresponds to any of the ranges of the voices in The Art of Fugue. Furthermore, none of the melodic shapes that characterize Bach's ensemble writing are found in the work, and there is no basso continuo.
3. The fugue types used are reminiscent of the types in The Well-Tempered Clavier, rather than Bach's ensemble fugues; Leonhardt also shows an "optical" resemblance between the fugues of the two collections, and points out other stylistic similarities between them.
4. Finally, since the bass voice in The Art of Fugue occasionally rises above the tenor, and the tenor becomes the "real" bass, Leonhardt deduces that the bass part was not meant to be doubled at 16-foot pitch, thus eliminating the pipe organ as the intended instrument, leaving the harpsichord as the most logical choice.

It is now generally accepted by scholars that the work was envisioned for keyboard.

== Fuga a 3 Soggetti ==
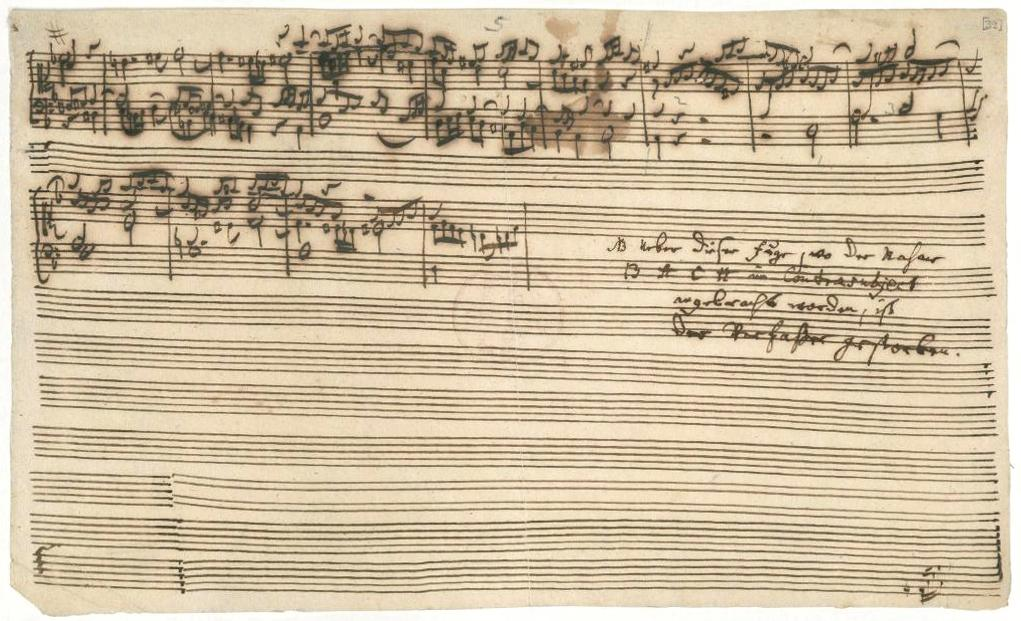
The final page of the Fuga a 3 Soggetti fragment, with a handwritten note by Carl Philipp Emanuel Bach that the composer died at this point.

Fuga a 3 Soggetti ("fugue in three subjects"), also called the "Unfinished Fugue" and Contrapunctus 14, was contained in a handwritten manuscript bundled with the autograph manuscript Mus. ms. autogr. P 200. It breaks off abruptly in the middle of its third section, with an only partially written measure 239. This autograph carries a note in the handwriting of Carl Philipp Emanuel Bach, stating "Über dieser Fuge, wo der Name B A C H im Contrasubject angebracht worden, ist der Verfasser gestorben." ("While working on this fugue, which introduces the name BACH [for which the English notation would be B♭–A–C–B♮] in the countersubject, the composer died.") This account is disputed by modern scholars, as the manuscript was written in Bach's own handwriting, and thus dates to a time before his deteriorating health and vision prevented him from writing, in their view probably 1748–1749.

=== Attempts at completion ===
Several musicologists and musicians have composed conjectural completions of Contrapunctus XIV which include the fourth subject, including:

- Musicologists Donald Tovey (1931); Zoltán Göncz (1992, which makes use of what he refers to as a permutational matrix of the 4 subjects); Yngve Jan Trede (1995); and Thomas Daniel (2010).
- Organists Helmut Walcha, David Goode, Lionel Rogg, and Davitt Moroney (1989).
- Conductor Rudolf Barshai (2010).
- Composer Kalevi Aho (2011), including versions for string quartet (first performed by saxophone quartet) and for string orchestra.
- Pianist Daniil Trifonov (2021).

Ferruccio Busoni's Fantasia contrappuntistica is based on Contrapunctus 14, but it develops Bach's ideas to Busoni's own purposes in Busoni's musical style, rather than working out Bach's thoughts as Bach himself might have done.

In total, there have been over 80 conjectural attempts to complete Contrapunctus 14.

In his 2007 doctoral thesis about the unfinished ending of Contrapunctus 14, the New Zealand organist and conductor Indra Hughes proposed that the work was left unfinished not because Bach died, but as a deliberate choice by Bach to encourage independent efforts at a completion.

Douglas Hofstadter's book Gödel, Escher, Bach discusses the unfinished fugue and Bach's supposed death during composition as a tongue-in-cheek illustration of the Austrian logician Kurt Gödel's first incompleteness theorem. According to Gödel, the very power of a "sufficiently powerful" formal mathematical system can be exploited to "undermine" the system, by leading to statements that assert such things as "I cannot be proven in this system". In Hofstadter's discussion, Bach's great compositional talent is used as a metaphor for a "sufficiently powerful" formal system; however, Bach's insertion of his own name "in code" into the fugue is not, even metaphorically, a case of Gödelian self-reference; and Bach's failure to finish his self-referential fugue serves as a metaphor for the unprovability of the Gödelian assertion, and thus for the incompleteness of the formal system.

== Significance ==
=== Principles of construction ===
Loïc Sylvestre and Marco Costa reported a mathematical architecture of The Art of Fugue, based on bar counts, which shows that the whole work could have been conceived on the basis of the Fibonacci series and the golden ratio.

Dominic Florence proposes that a concept he calls "opposition" governs all the methods that Bach uses in Contrapuncti 1, 2, 3, and 5 to create variety. These include changes in "melody (contrary motion), polyphony (contrapuntal inversion), harmony (dissonance), [rhythmic] density (texture), rhythm (syncopation), and tonality (modulation}". For example, Contrapuncti 1 and 2 both switch repeatedly between the keys of A minor and D minor; Contrapuncti 2 and 3 in addition enter F major and G minor, Contrapunctus 2 also visiting B-flat major once in a further "tonal remove": all three begin and end in D minor. He concludes that "Analyses of fugues should focus on continuous, dynamic, organic processes that evolve over time, rather than on the static and discontinuous dismemberment into strictly delineated sections."

=== Religious interpretations ===
In 1984, the German musicologist Hans Heinrich Eggebrecht suggested a possible religious interpretation of The Art of Fugue, which he agreed was impossible to prove: that the work illustrated in musical terms the Christian doctrine of redemption by God's grace alone, sola gratia, rather than by any action an individual can take. Eggebrecht noted the presence in fugue 3 of the presence of the composer's surname Bach in its theme, the sequence of notes B-A-C-H-C#-D. In Eggebrecht's view, this could mean that the composer is not just signing the work, but is placing himself by his grave, accepting sola gratia as he reaches towards the tonic note, which marks the end of the fugue and symbolically the end of his life. Further, the six-note fragment is chromatic, denoting sinful humanity, whereas the work as a whole is diatonic, symbolising God's perfection.

The Russian musicologist Anatoly Milka suggests that the various numbers embedded in the work have a numerological significance related to the Book of Revelation, the last book of the Bible which describes the apocalypse.

Anatoly Milka's numerological interpretation
Number	Use in The Art of Fugue	Significance
14	14 fugues (basic structure of the work)	The surname BACH, taking A=1, B=2, C=3, H=8; a symbol of Christ's cross (lines B---C intersecting A------H). These digits sum to 14.
7	Two blocks of 7 fugues (according to Milka)	7 seals = 4 Horsemen of the Apocalypse + 3 calamities, or 7 trumpets = 4 plagues + 3 woes
4	4 canons; fugues in each block in groups of 4 and 3	4 beasts in Revelation chapter 4 (animals of the 4 evangelists); see also the 4+3 symbolism above
3	Fugues in groups of 4 and 3	See the 4+3 symbolism above

== See also ==
- List of compositions by Johann Sebastian Bach
- List of compositions by Johann Sebastian Bach printed during his lifetime
