= Prelude and Fugue in B minor, BWV 544 =

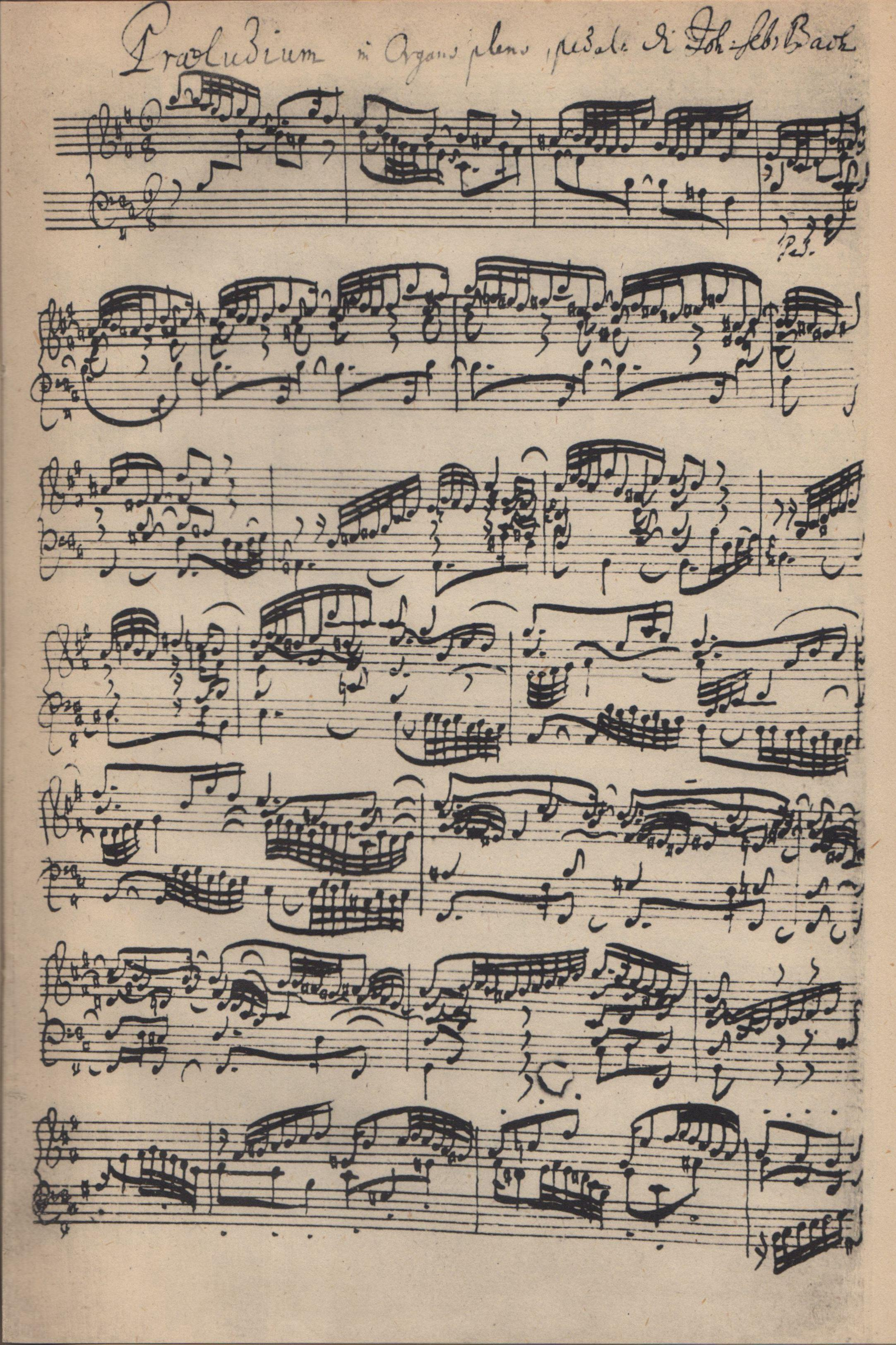
The beginning of the BWV 544 Prelude, in the hand of J.S. Bach.

Prelude and Fugue in B minor, BWV 544 is a piece of organ music written by Johann Sebastian Bach sometime between 1727 and 1731, during his tenure in Leipzig. Unlike most other organ preludes and fugues of Bach, the autograph fair copy of the score survives.

== History ==
The autograph manuscript shares the same watermark and style of handwriting as the Prelude and Fugue in E minor, BWV 548, which points to a composition period of 1727-1731.

Bach's B minor cantata Laß, Fürstin, laß noch einen Strahl, BWV 198 was performed on 17 October 1727 at the University Church in Leipzig as a funeral ode for Christiane Eberhardine, wife of August II the Strong, the Elector of Saxony and King of Poland. Contemporary accounts of the funeral note that there was an organ prelude and postlude played. In 1998, Gilles Cantagrel was the first to propose that BWV 544 was that organ work, pointing to the shared B minor affekt, stylistic similarities, and noting the tuning of the Scheibe organ at the church.

For nearly one hundred years the work circulated in manuscript copy form. In 1812 an anonymous editor for the Vienna firm Kunst- Und Industrie Comptoir published BWV 544 for the first time in the first printed collection of Bach's free organ works Six Preludes and Six Fugues for Organ or Piano with Pedal by Johann Sebastian Bach. The rights and plates for this work were sold around 1817 to Johann Riedl who continued to print the work. In the 1820s the rights were transferred to Steiner Verlag and then to Tobias Haslinger, both of whom re-engraved and printed new editions.

The work is central in Felix Mendelssohn's Bach revival; he learned BWV 544 from the leading early 19th century organist Johann Gottlob Schneider, the son of a pupil of Bach, and later owned the Riedl edition and edited his own publication in the 1850s. Schneider is recorded having played the work from a "shabby old book" for Henry Chorley in 1840, also likely the Riedl edition. Herbert Stanley Oakeley, who was a student of Schneider's in Saxony, heard Mendelssohn play the work in London, and would later own the manuscript. The work was in Clara Schumann's repertoire.

The existence of the manuscript was first mentioned in F. K. Griepenkerl's 1844 publication of the 2nd volume of Bach's Organ Works. This edition was later revised by F. A. Roitzsch at Peters Edition in Leipzig, and is the likely path the manuscript took to having been purchased in 1850 by a principal manager at Peters.

The manuscript's provenance is:

- Until 1750: in Johann Sebastian Bach's possession until his death
- 1750 to unknown: inherited by Johann Christian Bach
- Prior to 1850: unknown, although likely owned by Peters who published a first edition in 1844
- 1850 - 1860: owned by C. G. S. Boehme, principal manager of Peters (publisher of the work 6 years earlier), who acquired it with Professor S. H. Dehn as intermediary
- 1860 to 1903: owned by Scottish organist Herbert Stanley Oakeley
- 1860 to 1903: owned by Edward Murray Oakeley, a Master of Clifton College, to whom it was bequeathed by his brother Herbert. Shortly before his death, Edward Oakeley arranged for a photographic copy of the manuscript to be given to the Fitzwilliam Museum. This copy would later form the source for Otto Erich Deutsch's 1943 replica publication.
- 1903 to 1910: owned by Edward Murray Oakeley Jr in Florence, Italy, to whom it was bequeathed by his father.
- 1911 to 1927: owned by Wilhelm Heyer and the Heyer Museum in Cologne (later known as the Museum of Musical Instruments of Leipzig University), to whom Oakeley Jr. had sold his autograph collection
- 1927 to 1978: purchased and owned by Gisella Selden-Goth. In 1939, she arranged for the manuscript to be exhibited in the Avery Building at Columbia University on the occasion of the inauguration of the new Aeolian-Skinner organ at St. Paul's Chapel. She also arranged for the publication of the manuscript facsimile by Chiswick Press in 1943, part of a Harrow Replica series edited by Otto Erich Deutsch.
- 1978 to unknown: Albi Rosenthal, music collector in Oxford. Selden-Goth had promised to donate the manuscript to the Library of Congress along with the rest of her collection after her death. After her death, however, her estate sold the manuscript to Rosenthal. The manuscript held special significance for Rosenthal, who was inspired to become a music manuscript collector after having first seen it when visiting Selden-Goth in Florence.
- Unknown: Sold by Rosenthal to Robin Lehman.
- Current: In the Morgan Library's Robert Owen Lehman Collection.

== Composition ==
Like Bach's C Minor Passacaglia BWV 582 and the D Major Allabreve BWV 589, the manuscript is marked "pro Organo pleno", typically translated as "with the full organ" or more technically plenum registration. This corresponds with a Baroque tradition of playing "free" pieces such as preludes, fugues, fantasias, toccatas, etc (as opposed to chorales) at key periods of Protestant or Catholic church services, or for organ demonstrations and recitals.

=== Prelude ===
Tightly woven 32nd note scales, suspensions, dramatic octave pedal effects, tension-building through repetition, and appoggiatura harmonies characterize this movement. The opening theme is followed by contrasting fugal episodes. The complex ritornello structure of this prelude makes the work structurally similar to that of other mature organ works, such as the BWV 548 and BWV 546 preludes.

=== Fugue ===
The 4/4 fugue is more restrained compared to the 6/8 prelude, containing a relatively straightforward subject that moves stepwise up and down the B minor scale.

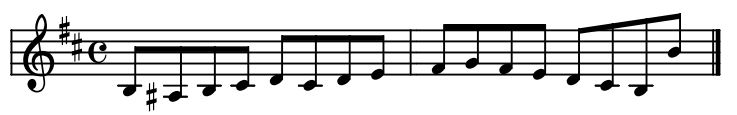
The fugue subject

== Arrangements ==
The piece has been transcribed multiple times for piano and small ensembles, most notably included in Franz Liszt's transcriptions of Bach's six "Great" organ Preludes and Fugues, BWV 543 - 548, for solo piano (S. 462). Where Bach's six free organ preludes and fugues are normally published in alphabetical order by key (with BWV coming second), Liszt rearranged the order, finishing with BWV544. Liszt's arrangement reverently preserves and transcribes Bach's music, without adding any new or original material or embellishments. Reger, a prolific Bach arranger himself, would dismiss Liszt's arrangement as "hackwork".

== In popular culture ==
BWV 544 has been used in several movie and television soundtracks. A notable inclusion is in the 1968 film The Chronicle of Anna Magdalena Bach, where Gustav Leonhardt, playing Bach, plays the opening ritornello.

== Work Cited ==
- Williams, Peter (2003), The Organ Music of J. S. Bach (2nd ed.), Cambridge University Press, ISBN 0-521-89115-9
- Jones, Richard D.P. (2013), The Creative Development of Johann Sebastian Bach, Volume II: 1717–1750: Music to Delight the Spirit. Oxford University Press, ISBN 978-0-19-969628-4
