= Clavier-Übung III =

Collection of organ compositions by Johann Sebastian Bach

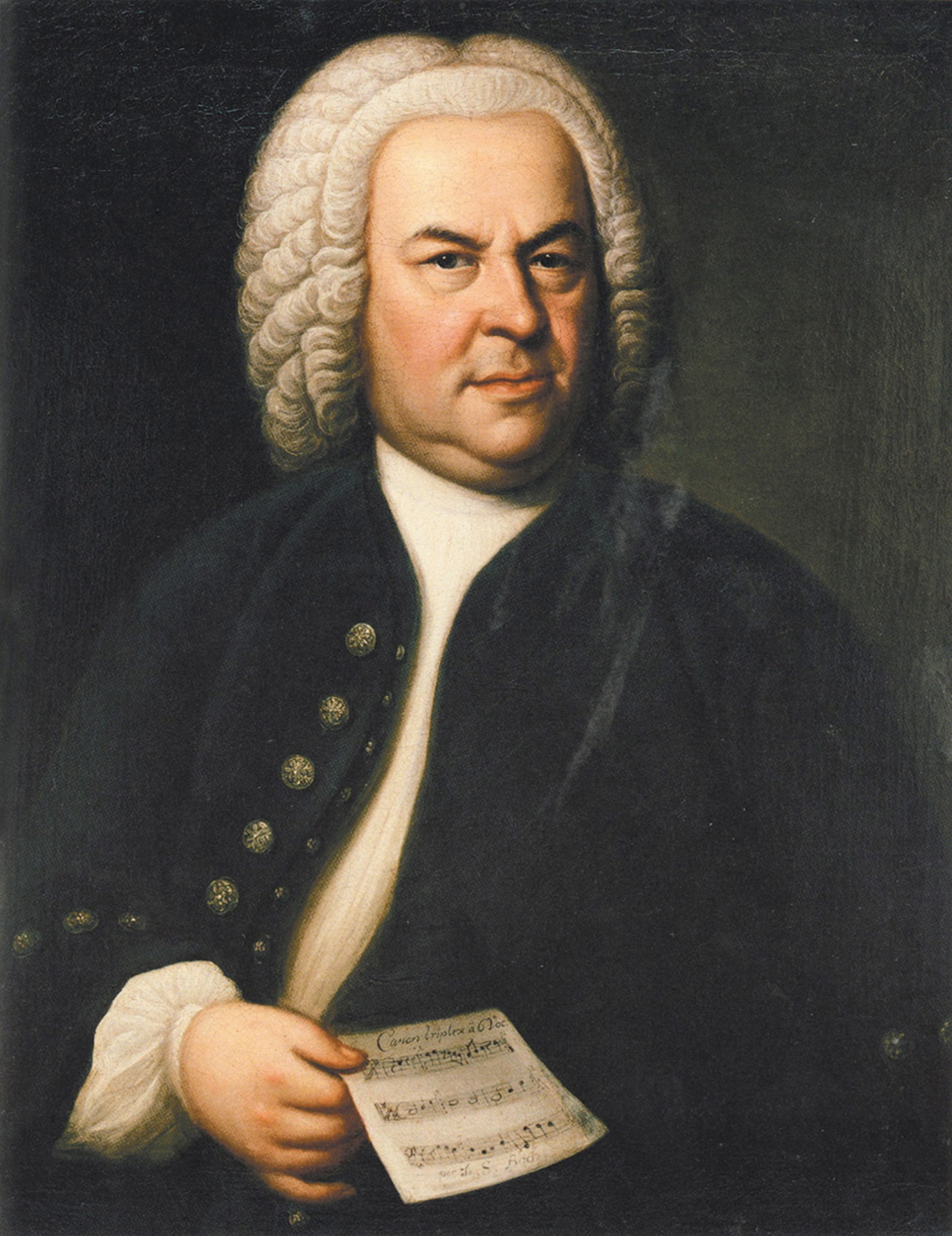
Johann Sebastian Bach, 1746

The Clavier-Übung III, sometimes referred to as the German Organ Mass, is a collection of compositions for organ by Johann Sebastian Bach, started in 1735–36 and published in 1739. It is considered Bach's most significant and extensive work for organ, containing some of his most musically complex and technically demanding compositions for that instrument.

In its use of modal forms, motet-style and canons, it looks back to the religious music of masters of the stile antico, such as Frescobaldi, Palestrina, Lotti and Caldara. At the same time, Bach was forward-looking, incorporating and distilling modern baroque musical forms, such as the French-style chorale.

The work has the form of an Organ Mass: between its opening and closing movements—the prelude and "St Anne" fugue in E♭ major, BWV 552—are 21 chorale preludes, BWV 669–689, setting two parts of the Lutheran Mass and six catechism chorales, followed by four duets, BWV 802–805. The chorale preludes range from compositions for single keyboard to a six-part fugal prelude with two parts in the pedal.

The purpose of the collection was fourfold: an idealized organ programme, taking as its starting point the organ recitals given by Bach himself in Leipzig; a practical translation of Lutheran doctrine into musical terms for devotional use in the church or the home; a compendium of organ music in all possible styles and idioms, both ancient and modern, and properly internationalised; and as a didactic work presenting examples of all possible forms of contrapuntal composition, going far beyond previous treatises on musical theory.

== History and origins ==
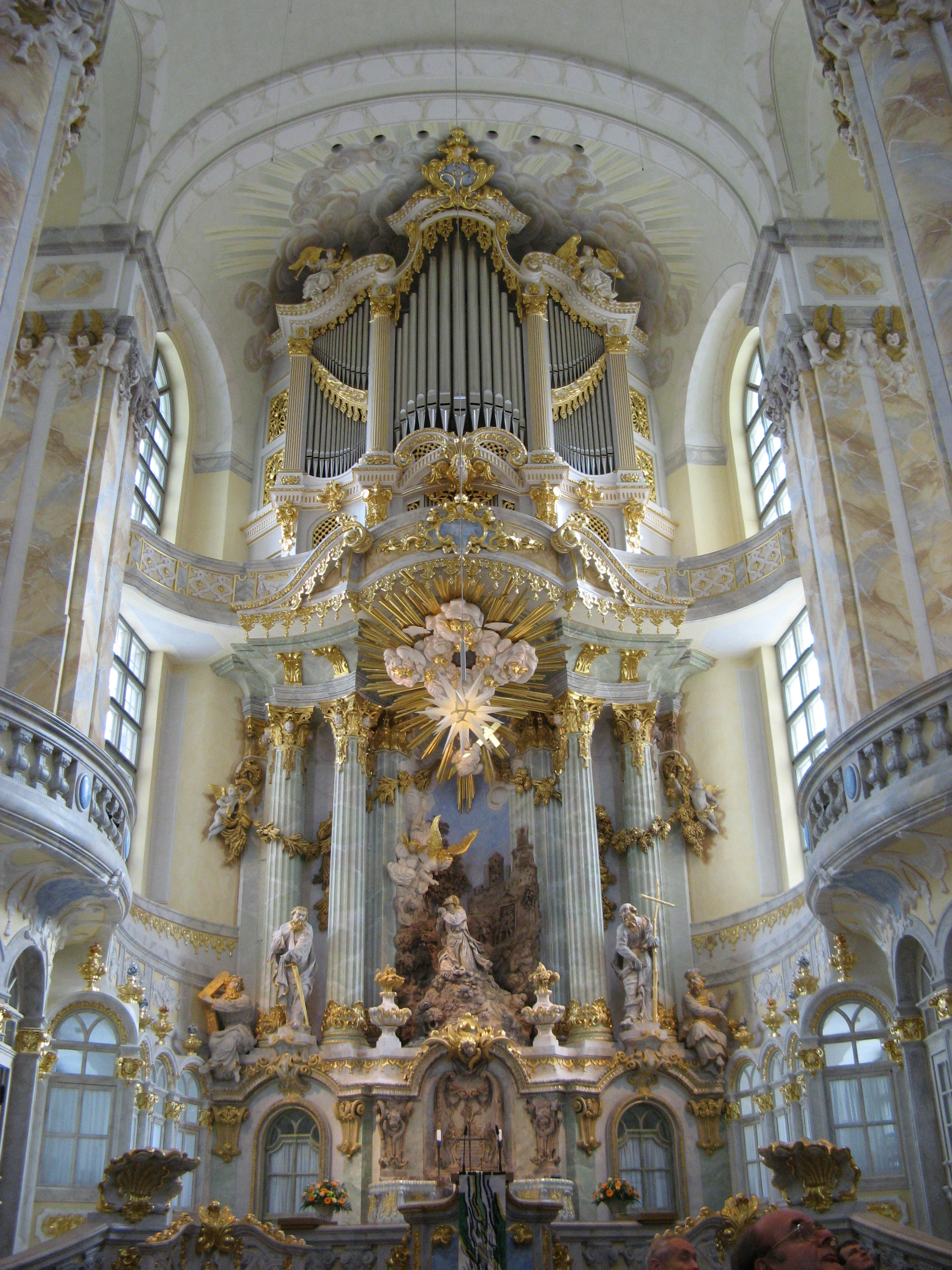
Reconstruction of the facade of the Silbermann organ in the Frauenkirche, Dresden on which Bach performed on 1 December 1736, a week after its dedication

25 November 1736 saw the consecration of a new organ, built by Gottfried Silbermann, in a central and symbolic position in the Frauenkirche, Dresden. The following week, on the afternoon of 1 December, Bach gave a two-hour organ recital there, which received "great applause". Bach was used to playing on church organs in Dresden, where since 1733 his son, Wilhelm Friedemann Bach, had been organist at the Sophienkirche. It is considered likely that for the December recital Bach performed for the first time parts of his as yet unpublished Clavier-Übung III, the composition of which, according to Gregory Butler's dating of the engraving, started as early as 1735. This inference has been drawn from the special indication on the title page that it was "prepared for music-lovers and particularly connoisseurs" of music; from contemporary reports of Bach's custom of giving organ recitals for devotees after services; and from the subsequent tradition among music lovers in Dresden of attending Sunday afternoon organ recitals in the Frauenkirche given by Bach's student Gottfried August Homilius, whose programme was usually made up of chorale preludes and a fugue. Bach was later to complain that the temperament on Silbermann organs was not well suited to "today's practice".

Clavier-Übung III is the third of four books of Bach's Clavier-Übung. It was the only portion of music meant for the organ, the other three parts being for harpsichord. The title, meaning "keyboard practice", was a conscious reference to a long tradition of similarly titled treatises: Johann Kuhnau (Leipzig, 1689, 1692), Johann Philipp Krieger (Nuremberg, 1698), Vincent Lübeck (Hamburg, 1728), Georg Andreas Sorge (Nuremberg, 1739) and Johann Sigismund Scholze (Leipzig 1736–1746). Bach started composing after finishing Clavier-Übung II—the Italian Concerto, BWV 971 and the Overture in the French style, BWV 831—in 1735. Bach used two groups of engravers because of delays in preparation: 43 pages by three engravers from the workshop of Johann Gottfried Krügner in Leipzig and 35 pages by Balthasar Schmid in Nuremberg. The final 78-page manuscript was published in Leipzig in Michaelmas (late September) 1739 at the relatively high price of 3 Reichsthaler. Bach's Lutheran theme was in keeping with the times, since already that year there had been three bicentenary Reformation festivals in Leipzig.

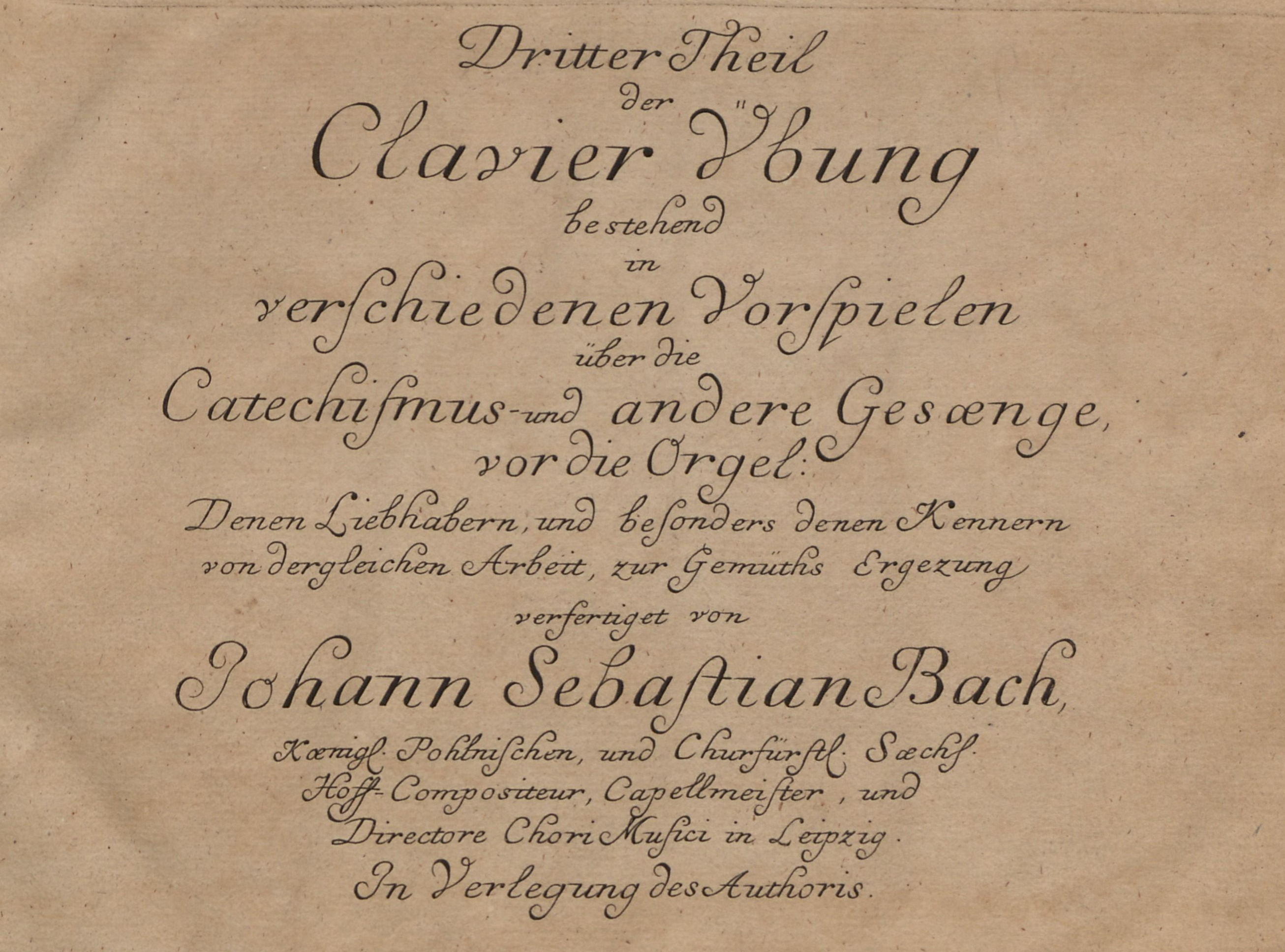
Title page of Clavier-Übung III

Dritter Theil der Clavier Übung bestehend in verschiedenen Vorspielen über die Catechismus- und andere Gesaenge, vor die Orgel: Denen Liebhabern, in besonders denen Kennern von dergleichen Arbeit, zur Gemüths Ergezung verfertiget von Johann Sebastian Bach, Koenigl. Pohlnischen und Churfürstl. Saechss. Hoff-Compositeur, Capellmeister, und Directore Chori Musici in Leipzig. In Verlegung des Authoris.

— Title page of Clavier-Übung III

In translation, the title page reads "Third Part of Keyboard Practice, consisting of various preludes on the Catechism and other hymns for the organ. Prepared for music-lovers and particularly for connoisseurs of such work, for the recreation of the spirit, by Johann Sebastian Bach, Royal Polish and Electoral Saxon Court Composer, Capellmeister and director of the chorus musicus, Leipzig. Published by the author".

Examination of the original manuscript suggests that the Kyrie-Gloria and larger catechism chorale preludes were the first to be composed, followed by the "St Anne" prelude and fugue and the manualiter chorale preludes in 1738 and finally the four duets in 1739. Apart from BWV 676, all the material was newly composed. The scheme of the work and its publication were probably motivated by Georg Friedrich Kauffmann's Harmonische Seelenlust (1733–1736), Conrad Friedrich Hurlebusch's Compositioni Musicali (1734–1735) and chorale preludes by Hieronymus Florentinus Quehl, Johann Gottfried Walther and Johann Caspar Vogler published between 1734 and 1737, as well as the older Livres d'orgue, the French Organ Masses of Nicolas de Grigny (1700), Pierre Dumage (1707) and others. Bach's formulation of the title page follows some of these earlier works in describing the particular form of the compositions and appealing to "connoisseurs", his only departure from the title page of Clavier-Übung II.

Although Clavier-Übung III is acknowledged to be not merely a miscellaneous collection of pieces, there has been no agreement on whether it forms a cycle or is just a set of closely related pieces. As with previous organ works of this type by composers such as François Couperin, Johann Caspar Kerll and Dieterich Buxtehude, it was in part a response to musical requirements in church services. Bach's references to Italian, French and German music place Clavier-Übung III directly in the tradition of the Tabulaturbuch, a similar but much earlier collection by Elias Ammerbach, one of Bach's predecessors at the Thomaskirche in Leipzig.

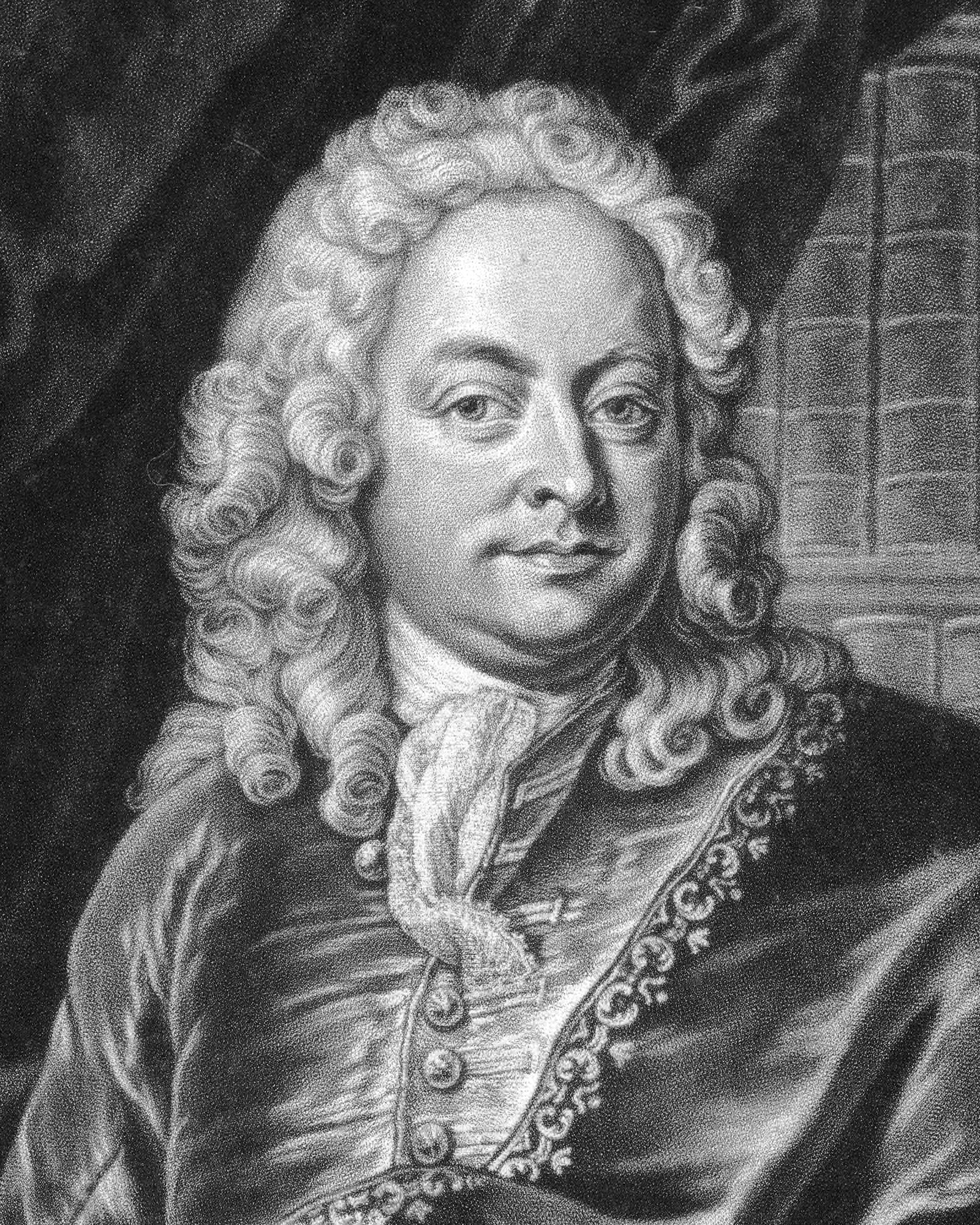
Johann Mattheson

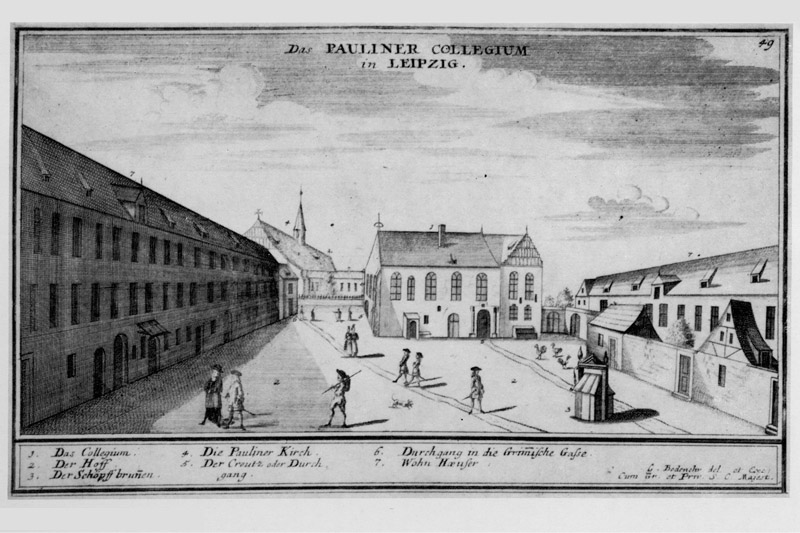
Engraving of the University of Leipzig with the Paulinerkirche, the university church, in the background. In the 1730s both of Bach's friends Mizler and Birnbaum were professors there and Bach's son Carl Philipp Emanuel was a student.

Bach's complex musical style had been criticized by some of his contemporaries. The composer, organist and musicologist Johann Mattheson remarked in "Die kanonische Anatomie" (1722):

It is true, and I have experienced it myself, that quick progress ... with artistic pieces (Kunst-Stücke) [i.e., canons and the like] can engross a sensible composer so that he can sincerely and secretly delight in his own work. But through this self-love we are unwittingly led away from the true purpose of music, until we hardly think of others at all, although it is our goal to delight them. Really we should follow not only our own inclinations, but those of the listener. I have often composed something that seemed to me trifling, but unexpectedly attained great favour. I made a mental note of this, and wrote more of the same, although it had little merit when judged according to artistry.

Until 1731, apart from his celebrated ridiculing in 1725 of Bach's declamatory writing in the cantata Ich hatte viel Bekümmernis, BWV 21, Mattheson's commentary on Bach had been positive. In 1730, however, he heard by chance that Gottfried Benjamin Hancke had been commenting unfavourably on his own keyboard technique: "Bach will play Mattheson into a sack and out again." From 1731 onwards, his vanity pricked, Mattheson's writing became critical of Bach, whom he referred to as "der künstliche Bach". Over the same period Bach's former pupil Johann Adolf Scheibe had been making stinging criticisms of Bach: in 1737 he wrote that Bach "deprived his pieces of all that was natural by giving them a bombastic and confused character, and eclipsed their beauty by too much art". Scheibe and Mattheson were employing practically the same lines of attack on Bach; and indeed Mattheson involved himself directly in Scheibe's campaign against Bach. Bach did not comment directly at the time: his case was argued with some discreet prompting from Bach by Johann Abraham Birnbaum, professor of rhetoric at the University of Leipzig, a music lover and friend of Bach and Lorenz Christoph Mizler. In March 1738 Scheibe launched a further attack on Bach for his "not inconsiderable errors":

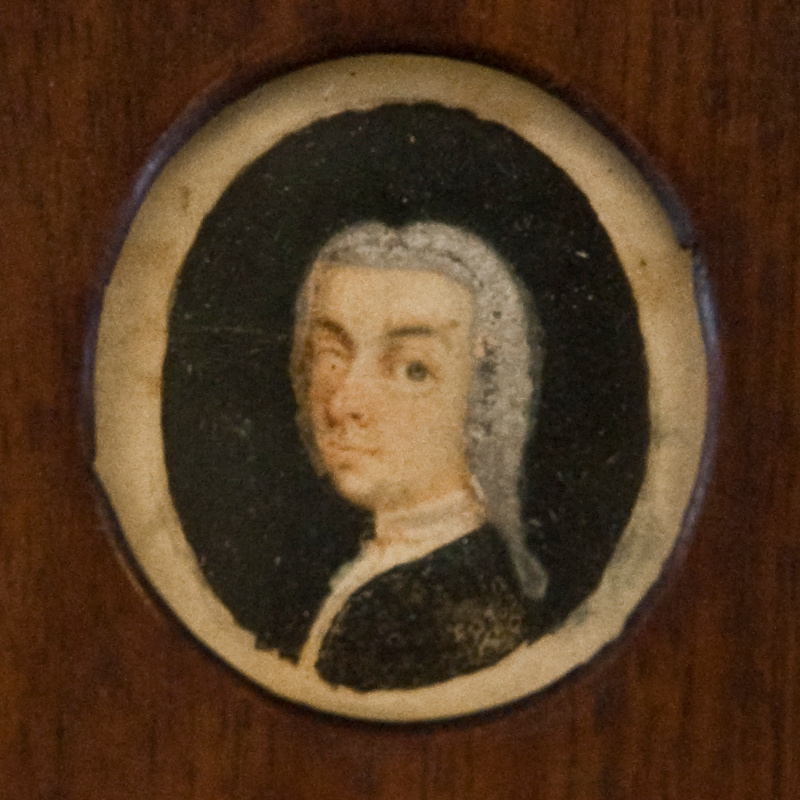
Johann Adolph Scheibe

This great man has not sufficiently studied the sciences and humanities which are actually required of a learned composer. How can a man who has not studied philosophy and is incapable of investigating and recognizing the forces of nature and reason be without fault in his musical work? How can he attain all the advantages which are necessary for the cultivation of good taste when he has hardly troubled himself with critical observations, investigations and with the rules which are as necessary to music as they are to rhetoric and poetry. Without them it is impossible to compose movingly and expressively.

In the advertisement in 1738 for his forthcoming treatise, Der vollkommene Capellmeister (1739), Mattheson included a letter by Scheibe, resulting from his exchanges with Birnbaum, in which Scheibe expressed strong preference for Mattheson's "natural" melody over Bach's "artful" counterpoint. Through his friend Mizler and his Leipzig printers Krügner and Breitkopf, also printers for Mattheson, like others Bach would have had advance knowledge of the content of Mattheson's treatise. Concerning counterpoint, Mattheson wrote:

Of double fugues with three subjects, there is, as far as I know, nothing else in print but my own work under the name, Die Wollklingende Fingerspruche, Parts I and II, which out of modesty I would commend to no one. On the contrary I would much rather see something of the same sort published by the famed Herr Bach in Leipzig, who is a great master of the fugue. In the meantime, this lack exposes abundantly, not only the weakened state and the decline of well-grounded contrapuntists on the one hand, but on the other hand, the lack of concern of today's ignorant organists and composers about such instructive matters.

Whatever Bach's personal reaction, the contrapuntal writing of Clavier-Übung III provided a musical response to Scheibe's criticisms and Mattheson's call to organists. Mizler's statement, cited above, that the qualities of Clavier-Übung III provided a "powerful refutation of those who have ventured to criticize the music of the Court Composer" was a verbal response to their criticisms. Nevertheless, most commentators agree that the main inspiration for Bach's monumental opus was musical, namely musical works like the Fiori musicali of Girolamo Frescobaldi, for which Bach had a special fondness, having acquired his own personal copy in Weimar in 1714.

== Textual and musical plan ==
BWV	Title	Liturgical significance	Form	Key
552/1	Praeludium		pro organo pleno	E♭
669	Kyrie, Gott Vater	Kyrie	cantus firmus in soprano	G
670	Christe, aller Welt Trost	Kyrie	c.f in tenor	C (or G)
671	Kyrie, Gott heiliger Geist	Kyrie	c.f. in pedal (pleno)	G
672	Kyrie, Gott Vater	Kyrie	3/4 manualiter	E
673	Christe, aller Welt Trost	Kyrie	6/4 manualiter	E
674	Kyrie, Gott heiliger Geist	Kyrie	9/8 manualiter	E
675	Allein Gott in der Höh'	Gloria	trio, manualiter	F
676	Allein Gott in der Höh'	Gloria	trio, pedaliter	G
677	Allein Gott in der Höh'	Gloria	trio, manualiter	A
678	Dies sind die heil'gen zehn Gebot'	Ten Commandments	c.f. in canon	G
679	Dies sind die heil'gen zehn Gebot'	Ten Commandments	fugue, manualiter	G
680	Wir glauben all an einen Gott	Creed	à 4, in organo pleno	D
681	Wir glauben all an einen Gott	Creed	fugue, manualiter	E
682	Vater unser im Himmelreich	Lord's Prayer	trio and c.f. in canon	E
683	Vater unser im Himmelreich	Lord's Prayer	non-fugal, manualiter	D
684	Christ unser Herr zum Jordan kam	Baptism	à 4, c.f. in pedal	C
685	Christ unser Herr zum Jordan kam	Baptism	fuga inversa, manualiter	D
686	Aus tiefer Noth schrei ich zu dir	Confession	à 6, in pleno organo	E
687	Aus tiefer Noth schrei ich zu dir	Confession	motet, manualiter	F♯
688	Jesus Christus, unser Heiland	Communion	trio, c.f. in pedal	D
689	Jesus Christus, unser Heiland	Communion	fugue, manualiter	F
802	Duetto I		3/8, minor	E
803	Duetto II		2/4, major	F
804	Duetto III		12/8, major	G
805	Duetto IV		2/2, minor	A
552/2	Fuga		a 5 voci per organo pleno	E♭

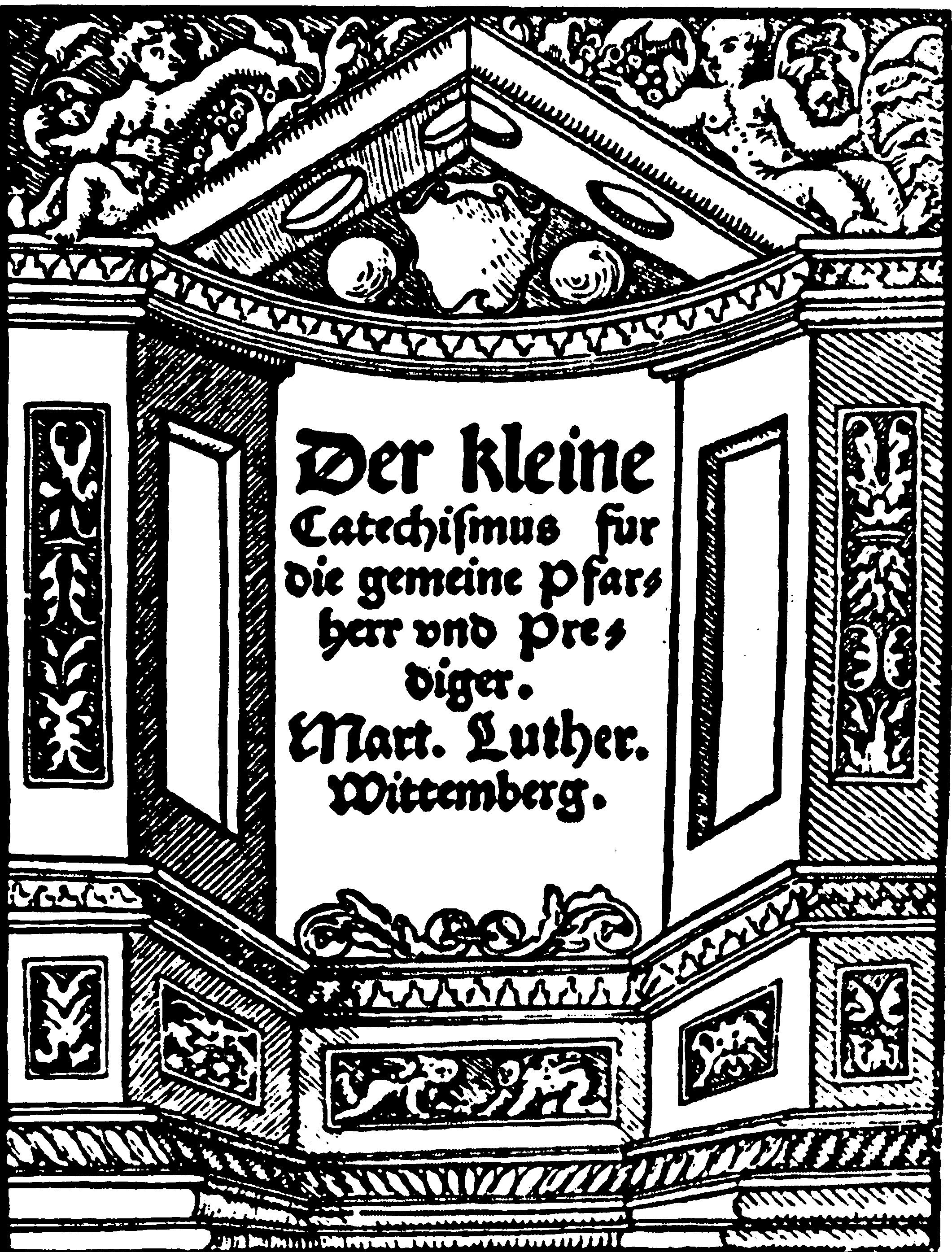
Title page of the small catechism of Martin Luther, 1529, intended for use by children

The number of chorale preludes in Clavier-Übung III, twenty-one, coincides with the number of movements in French organ Masses. The Mass and Catechism settings correspond to the schedule of Sunday worship in Leipzig, the morning Mass and afternoon catechism. In contemporary hymn books, the Lutheran Mass comprising the troped German Kyrie and German Gloria fell under the heading of the Holy Trinity. The organist and music theorist Jakob Adlung recorded in 1758 the custom of church organists playing the two Sunday hymns "Allein Gott in der Höh sei Ehr" and "Wir glauben all an einen Gott"' in different keys: Bach uses three of the six tonalities between E and B♭ mentioned for "Allein Gott". The organ had no role in the catechism examination, a series of questions and answers on the faith, so the presence of these hymns was probably a personal devotional statement of Bach. However, Luther's Shorter Catechism (see illustration) centres on the Ten Commandments, the Creed, the Lord's Prayer, Baptism, Office of the Keys and Confession, and the Eucharist, the exact subjects of Luther's own six catechism chorales. In Bach's part of Germany, these catechism hymns were sung at school assemblies on weekdays, with the Kyrie and Gloria on Sundays. Luther's hymn book contains all six of the chorales. However, it is more likely that Bach used these hymns, some of them Gregorian in origin, as a tribute to the main precepts of Lutheranism during the special bicentenary year of Luther's 1539 sermon in the Thomaskirche, Leipzig. The main texts for Lutherans were the Bible, the hymn book and the catechisms: Bach had already set numerous biblical texts in his cantatas and passions; in 1736 he had helped prepare a hymn book with Georg Christian Schemelli; finally in 1739 he set the catechism hymns (see earlier illustration of title page) as organ chorale preludes.

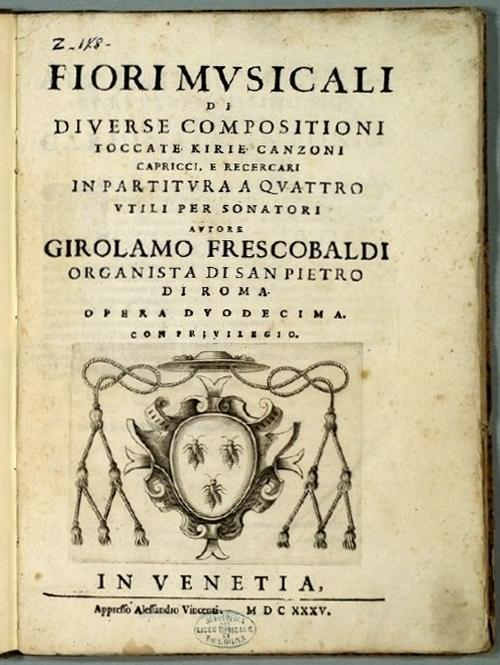
Title page of Fiori Musicali by Girolamo Frescobaldi, 1636

Williams (1980) has suggested the following features that Clavier-Übung III borrowed from Frescobaldi's Fiori musicali, Bach's personal copy of which was signed "J.S. Bach 1714":

- Intent. The Fiori were written "mainly to assist organists" with compositions "corresponding to Mass and vespers".
- Plan. The first of the three sets of the Fiori consists of a Toccata [prelude] before the Mass, 2 Kyries, 5 Christes, followed by a further 6 Kyries; then a Canzone (after the Epistle), a Ricercare (after the Credo), a Toccata Cromatica (for the Elevation) and finally a Canzona [fugue] (after the post-communion).
- Polyphony. Frescobaldi's short Kyries and Christes are written in four-part stile antico counterpoint. Many of them have a constantly running cantus firmus or pedal point.
- Structure. The mutations and combination of themes in fugue BWV 552/2 are closely matched by the closing canzona in the first set and the alternative ricercare in the second set of the Fiori. Similarly, the ostinato bass of the fugue BWV 680 is prefigured by a ricercare fugue with a five-note ostinato bass in the Fiori.

According to Williams (2003), Bach had a clear liturgical purpose in his organ compendium, with its cyclic order and plan, clear to the eye if not the ear. Even though the manualiter fugues were written at the time as Book 2 of The Well-Tempered Clavier, only the last fugue BWV 689 has anything in common. Bach's musical plan has a multitude of structures: the organum plenum pieces; the three styles of polyphony, manualiter and trio sonata in the Mass; the pairs in the Catechism, two with cantus firmus in canon, two with pedal cantus firmus, two for full organ); and the free invention in the duets. The fughetta BWV 681 at the centre of Clavier-Übung III plays a structural role similar to the central pieces in the other three parts of Bach's Clavier-Übung, to mark the beginning of the second half of the collection. It is written using the musical motifs of a French overture, as in the first movement of the fourth of Bach's keyboard Partitas BWV 828 (Clavier-Übung I), the first movement of his Overture in the French style, BWV 831 (Clavier-Übung II), the sixteenth variation of the Goldberg Variations BWV 988 (Clavier-Übung IV), marked "Ouverture. a 1 Clav", and Contrapunctus VII in the original manuscript version of Die Kunst der Fuge as contained in P200.

Although possibly intended for use in services, the technical difficulty of Clavier-Übung III, like that of Bach's later compositions—the Canonic Variations BWV 769, The Musical Offering BWV 1079 and The Art of Fugue BWV 1080—would have made the work too demanding for most Lutheran church organists. Indeed, many of Bach's contemporaries deliberately wrote music to be accessible to a wide range of organists: Sorge composed simple 3-part chorales in his Vorspiele (1750), because chorale preludes such as Bach's were "so difficult and almost unusable by players"; Vogel, Bach's former student from Weimar, wrote his Choräle "principally for those who have to play in country" churches; and another Weimar student, Johann Ludwig Krebs, wrote his Klavierübung II (1737) so that it could be played "by a lady, without much trouble".

Clavier-Übung III combines German, Italian and French styles, particularly in the opening Preludium, BWV 552/1, whose three thematic groups seem deliberately chosen to represent France, Italy and Germany respectively (see discussion of BWV 552/1 below). This reflects a trend in late 17th- and early 18th-century Germany for composers and musicians to write and perform in a style that became known as the "mixed taste", a phrased coined by Quantz. In 1730, Bach had written a now-famous letter to the Leipzig town council—his "Short but Most Necessary Draft for a Well-Appointed Church Music"—complaining not only of performing conditions, but also of the pressure to employ performing styles from different countries:

It is anyway, somewhat strange that German musicians are expected to be capable of performing at once and ex tempore all kinds of music, whether it comes from Italy or France, England or Poland.

Already in 1695, in the dedication of his Florilegium Primum, Georg Muffat had written, "I dare not employ a single style or method, but rather the most skillful mixture of styles I can manage through my experience in various countries ... As I mix the French manner with the German and Italian, I do not begin a war, but perhaps a prelude to the unity, the dear peace, desired by all the peoples." This tendency was encouraged by contemporary commentators and musicologists, including Bach's critics Mattheson and Scheibe, who, in praising the chamber music of his contemporary Georg Philipp Telemann, wrote that, "it is best if German part writing, Italian galanterie and French passion are combined".

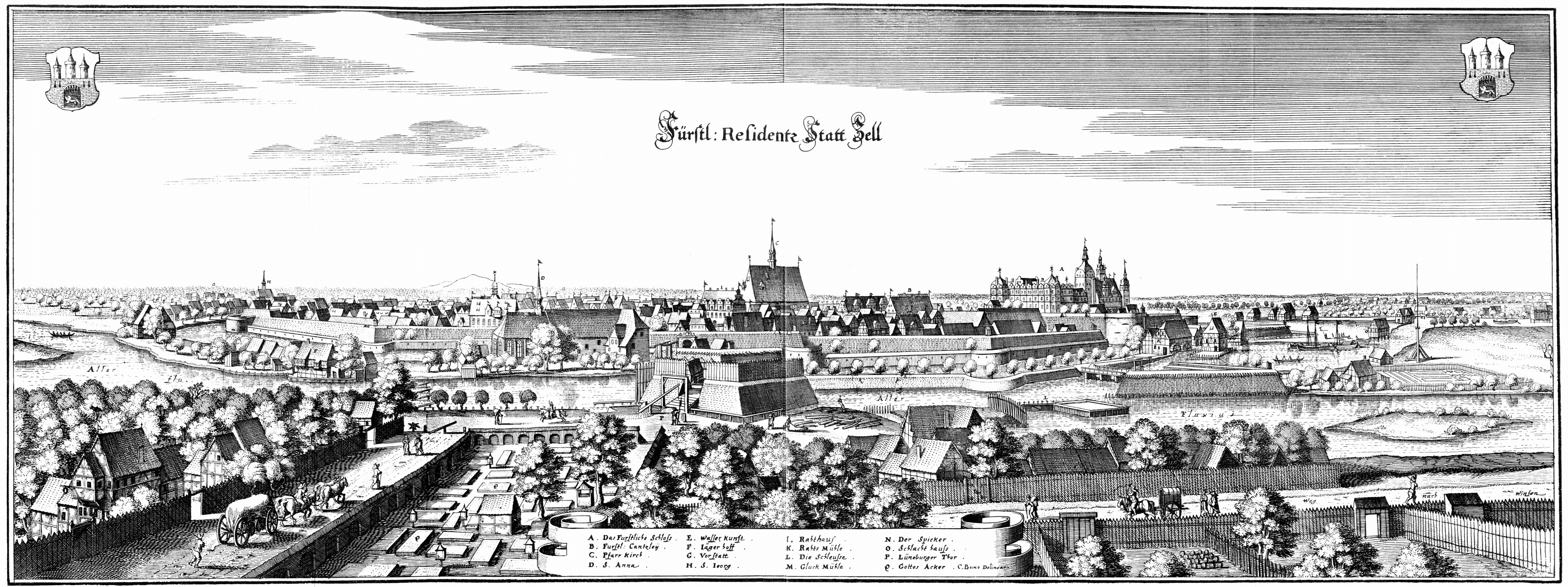
Engraving of Celle by Matthäus Merian, 1654

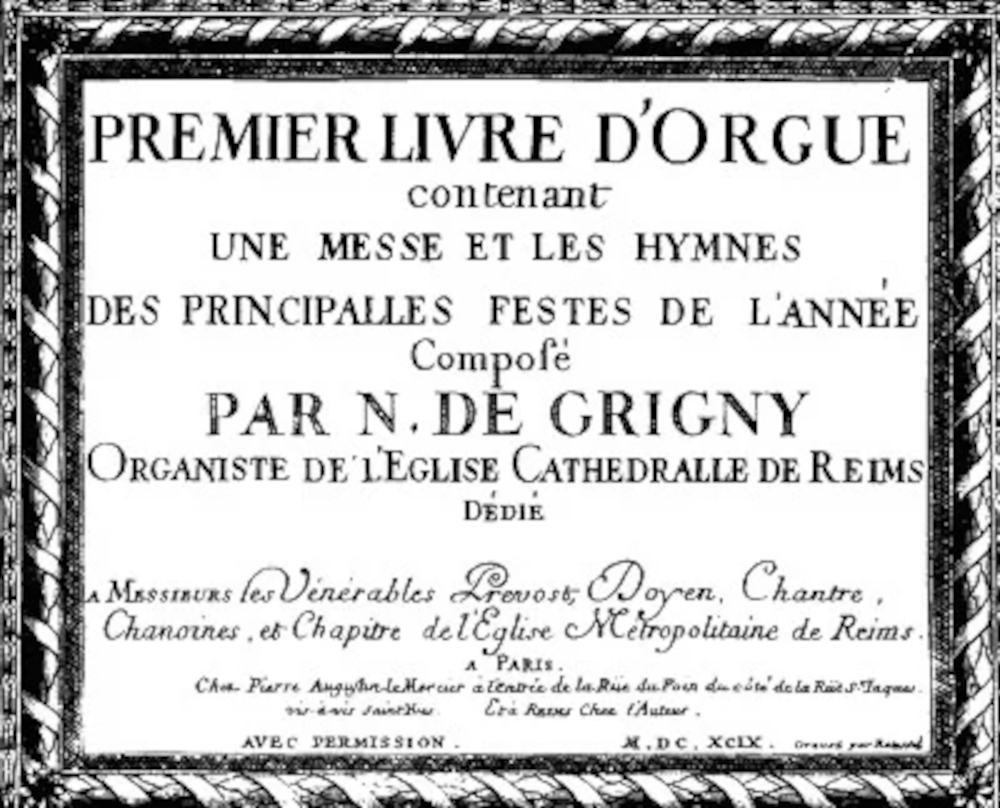
Title page of Premier Livre d'Orgue, the French organ Mass by Nicolas de Grigny, Paris 1699

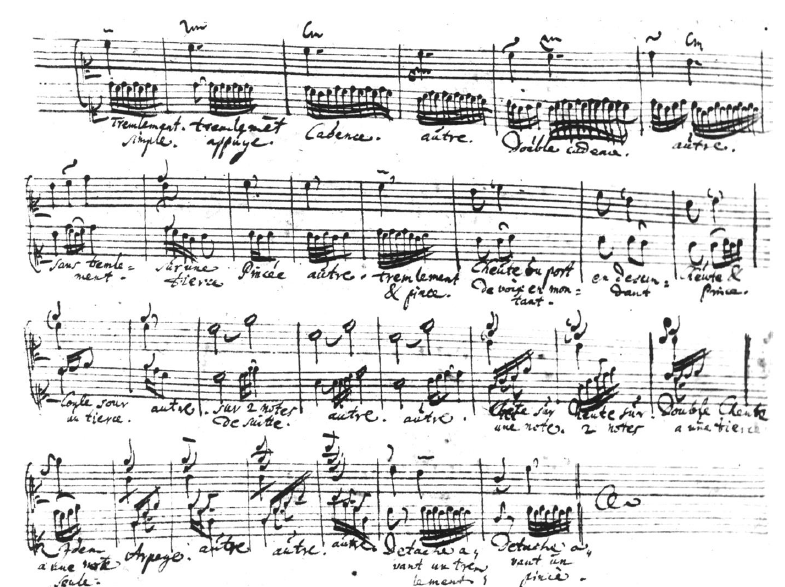
Table of ornaments from d'Anglebert's Pièces de Clavecin. copied by Bach in Weimar between 1709 and 1716 in the same manuscript as his copy of Grigny's Livre d'Orgue

Recalling Bach's early years in the Michaelisschule in Lüneburg between 1700 and 1702, his son Carl Philipp Emanuel records in the Nekrolog, Bach's obituary of 1754:

From there, through frequent hearing of the then famous orchestra, maintained by the Duke of Celle and consisting largely of Frenchmen, he had the opportunity of consolidating himself in the French style, which in those parts and at that time, was completely new.

The court orchestra of Georg Wilhelm, Duke of Braunschweig-Lüneburg was established in 1666 and concentrated on the music of Jean-Baptiste Lully, which became popular in Germany between 1680 and 1710. It is probable that Bach heard the orchestra at the Duke's summer residence at Dannenberg near Lüneburg. In Lüneburg itself, Bach would have also heard the compositions of Georg Böhm, organist at the Johanniskirche, and of Johann Fischer, a visitor in 1701, both of whom were influenced by the French style. Later in the Nekrolog C.P.E. Bach also reports that, "In the art of organ, he took the works of Bruhns, Buxtehude, and several good French organists as models." In 1775, he expanded on this to Bach's biographer Johann Nikolaus Forkel noting that his father had studied not only the works of Buxtehude, Böhm, Nicolaus Bruhns, Fischer, Frescobaldi, Froberger, Kerll, Pachelbel, Reincken and Strunck, but also of "some old and good Frenchmen."

Contemporary documents indicate that these composers would have included Boyvin, Nivers, Raison, d'Anglebert, Corrette, Lebègue, Le Roux, Dieupart, François Couperin, Nicolas de Grigny and Marchand. (The latter, according to an anecdote of Forkel, fled from Dresden in 1717 to avoid competing with Bach in a keyboard "duel".) At the court of Weimar in 1713, Prince Johann Ernst, a keen musician, is reported to have brought back Italian and French music from his travels in Europe. At the same time, or possibly earlier, Bach made meticulous copies of the entire Livre d'Orgue (1699) of de Grigny and the table of ornaments from d'Anglebert's Pièces de clavecin (1689), and his student Vogler made copies of two Livres d'Orgue of Boyvin. In addition, at Weimar, Bach would have had access to the extensive collection of French music of his cousin Johann Gottfried Walther. Much later, in the exchanges between Birnbaum and Scheibe over Bach's compositional style in 1738, while Clavier-Übung III was in preparation, Birnbaum brought up the works of de Grigny and Dumage in connection with ornamentation, probably at the suggestion of Bach. Apart from the elements of "French ouverture" style in the opening prelude BWV 552/1 and the central manualiter chorale prelude BWV 681, commentators agree that the two large-scale five-part chorale preludes—Dies sind die heil'gen zehn Gebot' BWV 678 and Vater unser im Himmelreich BWV 682—are partly inspired by the five-part textures of Grigny, with two parts in each manual and the fifth in the pedal.

Commentators have taken Clavier-Übung III to be a summation of Bach's technique in writing for the organ, and at the same time a personal religious statement. As in his other later works, Bach's musical language has an otherworldly quality, whether modal or conventional. Compositions apparently written in major keys, such as the trio sonatas BWV 674 or 677, can nevertheless have an ambiguous key. Bach composed in all known musical forms: fugue, canon, paraphrase, cantus firmus, ritornello, development of motifs and various forms of counterpoint. There are five polyphonic stile antico compositions (BWV 669–671, 686 and the first section of 552/ii), showing the influence of Palestrina and his followers, Fux, Caldara and Zelenka. Bach, however, even if he employs the long note values of the stile antico, goes beyond the original model, as for example in BWV 671.

Williams (2007) describes one aim of Clavier-Übung III as being to provide an idealized programme for an organ recital. Such recitals were described later by Bach's biographer Johann Nikolaus Forkel:

When Johann Sebastian Bach seated himself at the organ when there was no divine service, which he was often requested to do, he used to choose some subject and to execute it in all the forms of organ composition so that the subject constantly remained his material, even if he had played, without intermission, for two hours or more. First he used this theme for a prelude and fugue, with the full organ. Then he showed his art by using the stops for a trio, quartet, etc., always upon the same subject. Afterwards followed a chorale, the melody of which was playfully surrounded in the most diversified manner with the original subject, in three or four parts. Finally the conclusion was made by a fugue, with the full organ, in which either another treatment only of the first subject predominated, or one or, according to its nature, two others were mixed with it.

The musical plan of Clavier-Übung III conforms to this pattern of a collection of chorale preludes and chamber-like works framed by a free prelude and fugue for organum plenum.

== Numerological significance ==
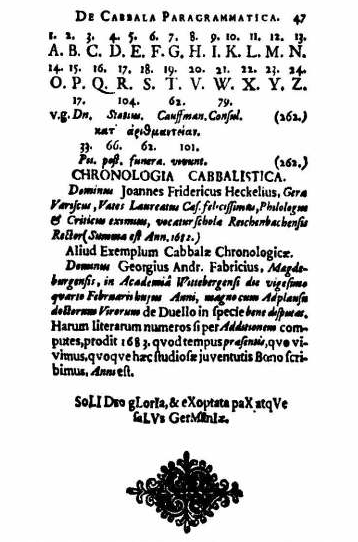
A baroque number alphabet in the Cabbalologia of Johann Henning, 1683

Wolff (1991) has given an analysis of the numerology of Clavier-Übung III. According to Wolff there is a cyclic order. The opening prelude and fugue frame three groups of pieces: the nine chorale preludes based on the kyrie and gloria of the Lutheran Mass; the six pairs of chorale preludes on the Lutheran catechism; and the four duets. Each group has its own internal structure. The first group is made up of three groups of three. The first three chorales on the kyrie in the stile antico hark back to the polyphonic Masses of Palestrina, with increasingly complex textures. The next group consists of three short versets on the kyrie that have progressive time signatures 6/8, 9/8, and 12/8. In the third group of three trio sonatas on the German gloria, two manualiter settings frame a trio for two manuals and pedal with a regular progression of keys, F major, G major and A major. Each pair of catechism chorales has a setting for two manuals and pedal followed by a smaller scale manualiter fugal chorale. The group of 12 catechism chorales is further broken up into two groups of six grouped around pivotal grand plenum organum settings (Wir glauben and Auf tiefer Noth). The duets are related by the successive key progression, E minor, F major, G major, and A minor. Clavier-Übung III thus combines many different structures: pivotal patterns; similar or contrasting pairs; and progressively increasing symmetry. There is also an overriding numerological symbolism. The nine Mass settings (3 × 3) refer to the three of the Trinity in the Mass, with specific reference to Father, Son and Holy Ghost in the corresponding texts. The number twelve of the catechism chorales can be seen as a reference to the usual ecclesiastical use of the number 12, the number of disciples. The whole work has 27 pieces (3 × 3 × 3), completing the pattern. However, despite this structure, it is unlikely that the work was ever intended to be performed as a whole: it was intended as a compendium, a resource for organists for church performances, with the duets possibly accompaniments for communion.

Williams (2003) comments on the occurrences of the golden ratio in Clavier-Übung III pointed out by various musicologists. The division of bars between the prelude (205) and fugue (117) provides one example. In the fugue itself the three parts have 36, 45 and 36 bars, so the golden ratio appears between lengths of the middle section and outer sections. The midpoint of the middle section is pivotal, with the first appearance there of the first subject against a disguised version of the second. Finally in BWV 682, Vater unser in Himmelreich (the Lord's Prayer), a pivotal point, where the manual and pedal parts are exchanged, occurs at bar 41, which is the sum of the numerical order of letters in JS BACH (using the Baroque convention of identifying I with J and U with V). The later cadence at bar 56 in the 91 bar chorale prelude gives another instance of the golden ratio. 91 itself factorises as 7, signifying prayer, times 13, signifying sin, the two elements—canonic law and the wayward soul—also represented directly in the musical structure.

== Prelude and fugue BWV 552 ==
The descriptions below are based on the detailed analysis in Williams (2003).

=== BWV 552/1 Praeludium ===
Prelude in E♭ major, BWV 552/1

Complete score as published by the Bach Gesellschaft in 1852

Together with the Toccata in F major BWV 540, this is the longest of Bach's organ preludes. It combines the elements of a French overture (first theme), an Italian concerto (second theme) and a German fugue (third theme), although adapted to the organ. There are the conventional dotted rhythms of an ouverture, but the alternation of themes owes more to the tradition of contrasting passages in organ compositions than the solo-tutti exchanges in a Vivaldi concerto. Originally possibly written in the key of D major, a more common key for a concerto or ouverture, Bach might have transposed it and the fugue into E♭ major because Mattheson had described the key in 1731 as a "beautiful and majestic key" avoided by organists. The piece also has three separate themes (A, B, C), sometimes overlapping, which commentators have interpreted as representing the Father, Son and Holy Ghost in the Trinity. Other references to the Trinity include the three flats in the key signature, like the accompanying fugue.

As the prelude progresses, the reprises of the first theme are shortened, as in a typical Vivaldi concerto; that of the second theme is simply transposed to the dominant; and those of the third theme become more extended and developed. There are no toccata-like passages and the musical writing is quite different from that of the period. For each theme the pedal part has a different character: a baroque basso continuo in the first theme; a quasi-pizzicato bass in the second; and a stile antico bass in the third, with notes alternating between the feet. All three themes share a three semiquaver figure: in the first theme in bar 1, it is a figure typical of a French ouverture; in the second theme in bar 32, it is an echo in the galant Italian style; and in the third theme in bar 71, it is a motif typical of German organ fugues. The three themes reflect national influences: the first French; the second Italian, with its galant writing; and the third German, with many elements drawn from the tradition of North German organ fugues. The markings of forte and piano in the second theme for the echos show that at least two manuals were needed; Williams has suggested that perhaps even three manuals could have been intended, with the first theme played on the first keyboard, the second and third on the second and the echos on the third.

Section	Bars	Description	Bar length
A1	1–32	First theme – God, the Father	32 bars
B1	32 (upbeat)–50	Second theme – God, the Son; bar 50, one bar of first theme	18 bars
A2	51–70	First part of first theme	20 bars
C1	71–98 (overlap)	Third theme – the Holy Ghost	27 bars
A3	98 (overlap)–111	Second part of first theme	14 bars
B2	111 (upbeat)–129	Second theme transposed up a fourth; bar 129, one bar of first theme	18 bars
C2	130–159	Third theme with countersubject in pedal	30 bars
C3	160–173 (overlap)	Third theme in B♭ minor	14 bars
A4	173 (overlap)–205	Repeat of first theme	32 bars

First theme: God, the Father

The first theme has the dotted rhythms, marked with slurs, of a French ouverture. It is written for five parts with complex suspended harmonies.

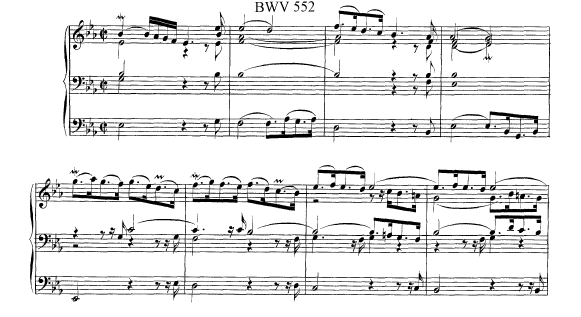

The first reprise (A2) of the theme in the minor key contains typically French harmonic progressions:

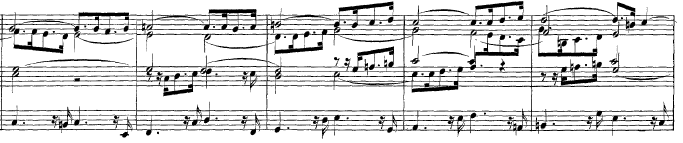

Second theme: God, the Son

This theme, representing God, the Son, the "kind Lord", has two bar phrases of staccato three-part chords in the galant style, with echo responses marked piano.

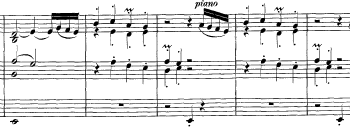

This is followed by a more ornate syncopated version which is not further developed during the prelude:

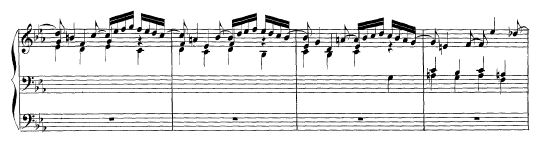

Third theme: the Holy Ghost

This theme is a double fugue based on semiquavers, representing "the Holy Ghost, descending, flickering like tongues of fire." The semiquavers are not marked with slurs, according to North German conventions. In the final development (C3) the theme passes into E♭ minor, presaging the close of the movement, but also harking back to the previous minor episode and anticipating similar effects in later movements of Clavier-Übung III, such as the first duet BWV 802. The older style two- or three-part writing forms a contrast to the harmonically more complex and modern writing of the first theme.

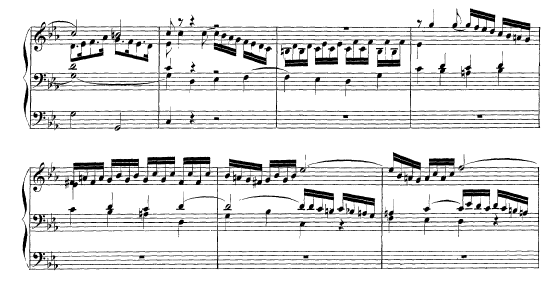

The semiquaver subject of the fugue is adapted for the pedal in the traditional way using alternating foot technique:

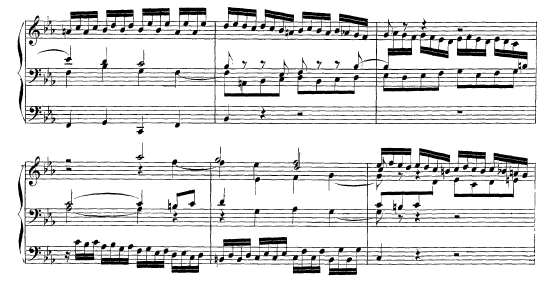

=== BWV 552/2 Fuga ===
Fugue in E♭ major, BWV 552/2

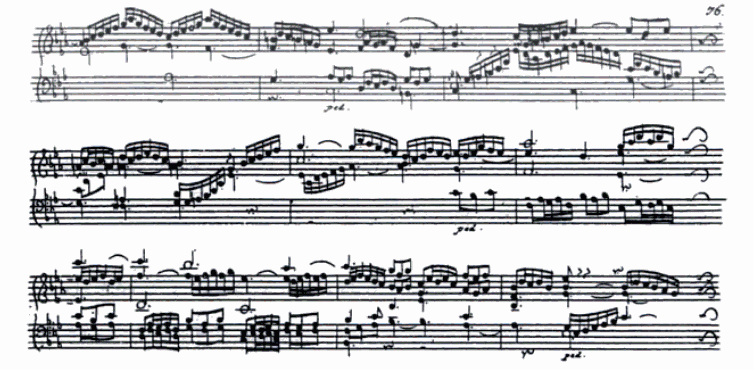
Part of the third section of the Fuga BWV 552 from the 1739 print

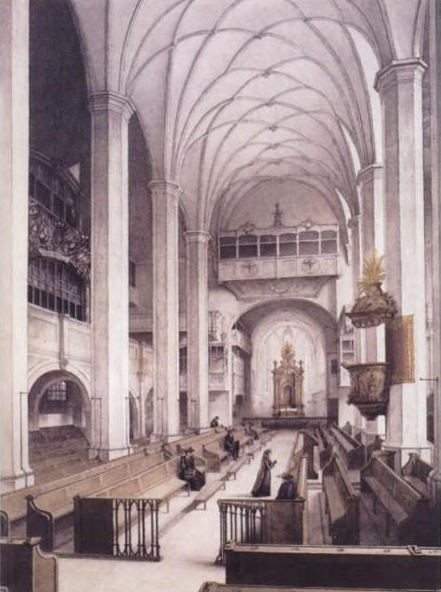
Hubert Kratz, c 1880: Eastward view of interior of the Thomaskirche in Leipzig, where Martin Luther preached in 1539 and where Bach served as cantor from 1723 until his death in 1750. The main organ was at the west end of the church with a smaller swallow's nest organ at the east end.

The triple fugue ... is a symbol of the Trinity. The same theme recurs in three connected fugues, but each time with another personality. The first fugue is calm and majestic, with an absolutely uniform movement throughout; in the second the theme seems to be disguised, and is only occasionally recognisable in its true shape, as if to suggest the divine assumption of an earthly form; in the third, it is transformed into rushing semiquavers as if the Pentacostal [sic?] wind were coming roaring from heaven.

— Albert Schweitzer, Jean-Sebastien Bach, le musicien-poête, 1905

The fugue in E♭ major BWV 552/2 that ends Clavier-Übung III has become known in English-speaking countries as the "St. Anne" because of the first subject's resemblance to a hymn tune of the same name by William Croft, a tune that was not likely known to Bach. A fugue in three sections of 36 bars, 45 bars and 36 bars, with each section a separate fugue on a different subject, it has been called a triple fugue. However, the second subject is not stated precisely within the third section, but only strongly suggested in bars 93, 99, 102–04, and 113–14.

The number three

The number three is pervasive in both the Prelude and the Fugue, and has been understood by many to represent the Trinity. The description of Albert Schweitzer follows the 19th-century tradition of associating the three sections with the three different parts of the Trinity. The number three, however, occurs many other times: in the number of flats of the key signature; in the number of fugal sections; and in the number of bars in each section, each a multiple of three (3 × 12, 3 x 15), as well as in the month (September = 09 or 3 x 3) and year (39 or 3 x 13) of publication. Each of the three subjects seems to grow from the previous ones. Indeed, musicologist Hermann Keller has suggested that the second subject is "contained" in the first. Although perhaps hidden in the score, this is more apparent to the listener, both in their shape and in the resemblance of the quaver second subject to crotchet figures in the countersubject to the first subject. Similarly, the semiquaver figures in the third subject can be traced back to the second subject and the countersubject of the first section.

Form of the fugue

The form of the fugue conforms to that of a 17th-century tripartite ricercar or canzona, such as those of Froberger and Frescobaldi: firstly in the way that themes become progressively faster in successive sections; and secondly in the way one theme transforms into the next. Bach can also be seen as continuing a Leipzig tradition for contrapuntal compositions in sections going back to the keyboard ricercars and fantasias of Nicolaus Adam Strungk and Friedrich Wilhelm Zachow. The tempo transitions between different sections are natural: the minims of the first and second sections correspond to the dotted crotchets of the third.

Source of the subjects

Many commentators have remarked on similarities between the first subject and fugal themes by other composers. As an example of stile antico, it is more probably a generic theme, typical of the fuga grave subjects of the time: a "quiet 4/2" time signature, rising fourths and a narrow melodic range. Roger Wibberly has shown that the foundation of all three fugue subjects, as well as of certain passages in the Prelude, may be found in the first four phrases of the chorale "O Herzensangst, O Bangigkeit". The first two sections of BWV 552/2 share many affinities with the fugue in E♭ major BWV 876/2 in The Well-Tempered Clavier, Book 2, written during the same period. Unlike true triple fugues, like the F♯ minor BWV 883 from the same book or some of the contrapuncti in The Art of the Fugue, Bach's intent with BWV 552/2 may not have been to combine all three subjects, although this would theoretically have been possible. Rather, as the work progresses, the first subject is heard singing out through the others: sometimes hidden; sometimes, as in the second section, quietly in the alto and tenor voices; and finally, in the last section, high in the treble and, as the climactic close approaches, quasi-ostinato in the pedal, thundering out beneath the two sets of upper voices. In the second section it is played against quavers; and in parts of the last, against running semiquaver passagework. As the fugue progresses, this creates what Williams has called the cumulative effect of a "mass choir". In later sections, to adapt to triple time, the first subject becomes rhythmically syncopated, resulting in what the music scholar Roger Bullivant has called "a degree of rhythmic complexity probably unparalleled in fugue of any period".

Section	Bars	Time signature	Description	Features	Style
First	1–36 [36]	4/2	a pleno organo, 5 parts, 12 entries, countersubject in crotchets	prominence of rising fourths, stretti at bars in parallel thirds (b.21) and sixths (b.26)	Stile antico, fuga grave
Second	37–81 [45]	6/4	manualiter, 4 parts, second subject, then 15 entries of combined first and second subjects from b.57	prominence of seconds and thirds, partial combination of first and second subjects at b.54	Stile antico
Third	82–117 [36]	12/8	a pleno organo, 5 parts, third subject, then combined first and third subjects from b.87	prominence of falling fifths, semiquaver figures recalling second subject, 2 entries of third subject and 4 of first in pedal	Stile moderno, gigue-like

First section

The first section is a quiet 4/2 five-part fugue in the stile antico. The countersubject is in crotchets.

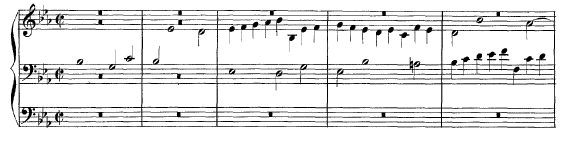

There are two stretto passages, the first in thirds (below) and the second in sixths.

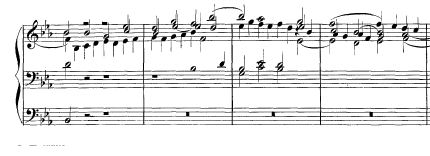

Second section

The second section is a four-part double fugue on a single manual. The second subject is in running quavers and starts on the second beat of bar 37.

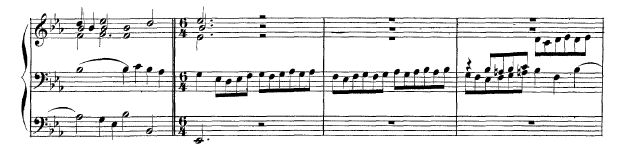

The first subject reappears gradually, first hinted at in the inner parts (bars 44–46)

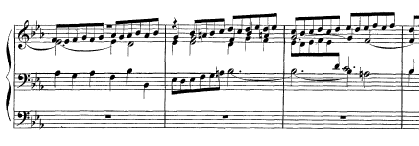

then in the treble of bar 54

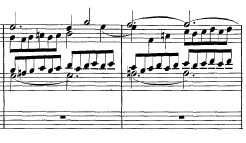

before rising up from the lower register as a fully fledged countersubject (bars 59–61).

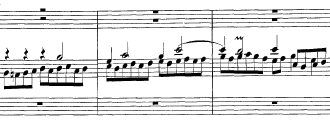

Third section

The third section is a five-part double fugue for full organ. The preceding bar in the second section is played as three beats of one minim (a hemiola) and thus provides the new pulse. The third subject is lively and dancelike, resembling a gigue, again starting on the second beat of the bar. The characteristic motif of 4 semiquavers in the third beat has already been heard in the countersubject of the first section and in the second subject. The running semiquaver passagework is an accelerated continuation of the quaver passagework of the second section; occasionally it incorporates motifs from the second section.

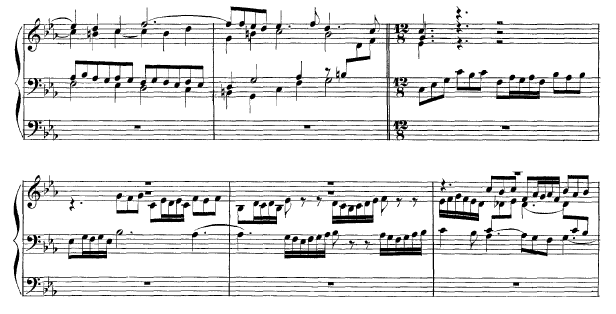

At bar 88, the third subject merges into the first subject in the soprano line, although not fully apparent to the ear. Bach with great originality does not change the rhythm of the first subject, so that it becomes syncopated across bars. The subject is then passed to an inner part where it at last establishes its natural pairing with the third subject: two entries of the third exactly match a single entry of the first.

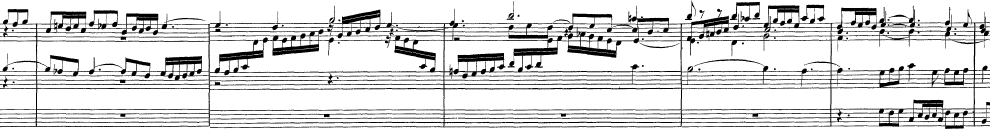

Apart from a final statement of the third subject in the pedal and lower manual register in thirds, there are four quasi-ostinato pedal statements of the first subject, recalling the stile antico pedal part of the first section. Above the pedal the third subject and its semiquaver countersubject are developed with increasing expansiveness and continuity. The penultimate entry of the first subject is a canon between the soaring treble part and the pedal, with descending semiquaver scales in the inner parts. There is a climactic point at bar 114—the second bar below—with the final resounding entry of the first subject in the pedal. It brings the work to its brilliant conclusion, with a unique combination of the backward looking stile antico in the pedal and the forward looking stile moderno in the upper parts. As Williams comments, this is "the grandest ending to any fugue in music".

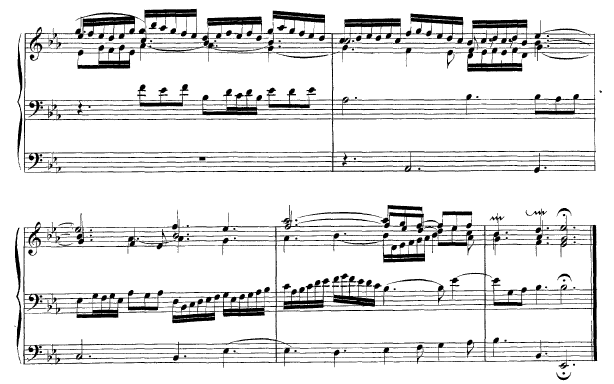

== Chorale preludes BWV 669–689 ==
The descriptions of the chorale preludes are based on the detailed analysis in Williams (2003).
To listen to a MIDI recording, please click on the link.

=== Chorale preludes BWV 669–677 (Lutheran Mass) ===
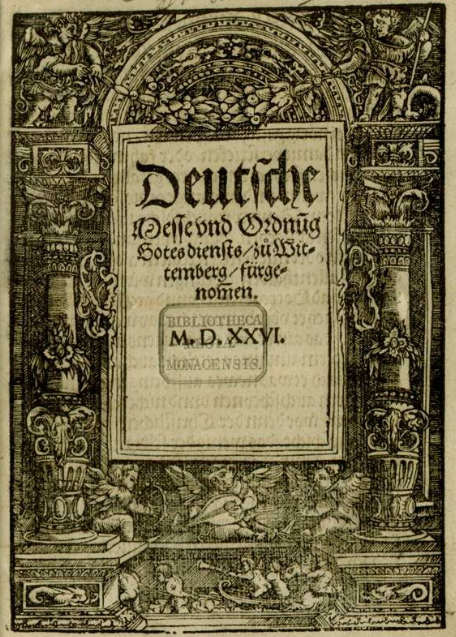
Martin Luther, 1526: Title page of Deutsche Messe

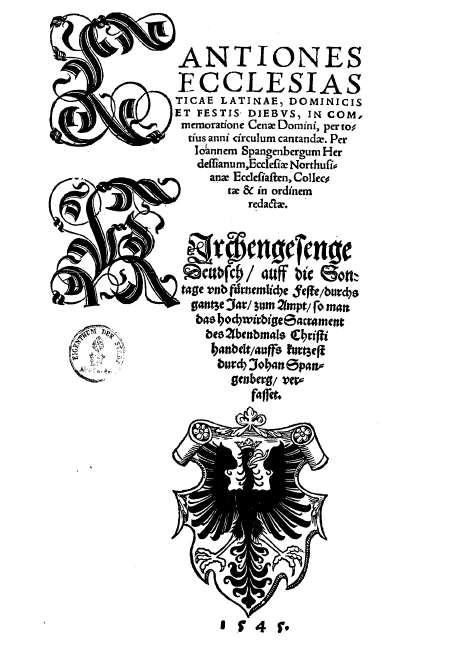
Title page of the hymn book in Latin and German of Johann Spangenberg published in Magdeburg in 1545

These two chorales—German versions of the Kyrie and Gloria of the Lutheran missa brevis — have here a peculiar importance as being substituted in the Lutheran church for the two first numbers of the mass, and sung at the beginning of the service in Leipzig. The task of glorifying in music the doctrines of Lutheran christianity which Bach undertook in this set of chorales, he regarded as an act of worship, at the beginning of which he addressed himself to the Triune God in the same hymns of prayer and praise as those sung every Sunday by the congregation.

— Philipp Spitta, Johann Sebastian Bach, 1873

In 1526, Martin Luther published his Deutsche Messe, describing how the Mass could be conducted using congregational hymns in the German vernacular, intended in particular for use in small towns and villages where Latin was not spoken. Over the next thirty years numerous vernacular hymnbooks were published all over Germany, often in consultation with Luther, Justus Jonas, Philipp Melanchthon and other figures of the German Reformation. The 1537 Naumburg hymnbook, drawn up by Nikolaus Medler, contains the opening Kyrie, Gott Vater in Ewigkeit, one of several Lutheran adaptations of the troped Kyrie summum bonum: Kyrie fons bonitatus. The first Deutsche Messe in 1525 was held at Advent so did not contain the Gloria, explaining its absence in Luther's text the following year. Although there was a German version of the Gloria in the Naumburg hymnal, the 1523 hymn "Allein Gott in der Höh sei Ehr" of Nikolaus Decius, also adapted from plainchant, eventually became adopted almost universally throughout Germany: it first appeared in print with these words in the 1545 Magdeburg hymnal Kirchengesenge Deudsch of the reformist Johann Spangenberg. A century later, Lutheran liturgical texts and hymnody were in wide circulation. In Leipzig, Bach had at his disposal the Neu Leipziger gesangbuch (1682) of Gottfried Vopelius. Luther was a firm advocate of the use of the arts, particularly music, in worship. He sang in the choir of the Georgenkirche in Eisenach, where Bach's uncle Johann Christoph Bach was later organist, his father Johann Ambrosius Bach one of the main musicians and where Bach himself would sing, a pupil at the same Latin school as Luther between 1693 and 1695.

==== Pedaliter settings of Kyrie BWV 669–671 ====
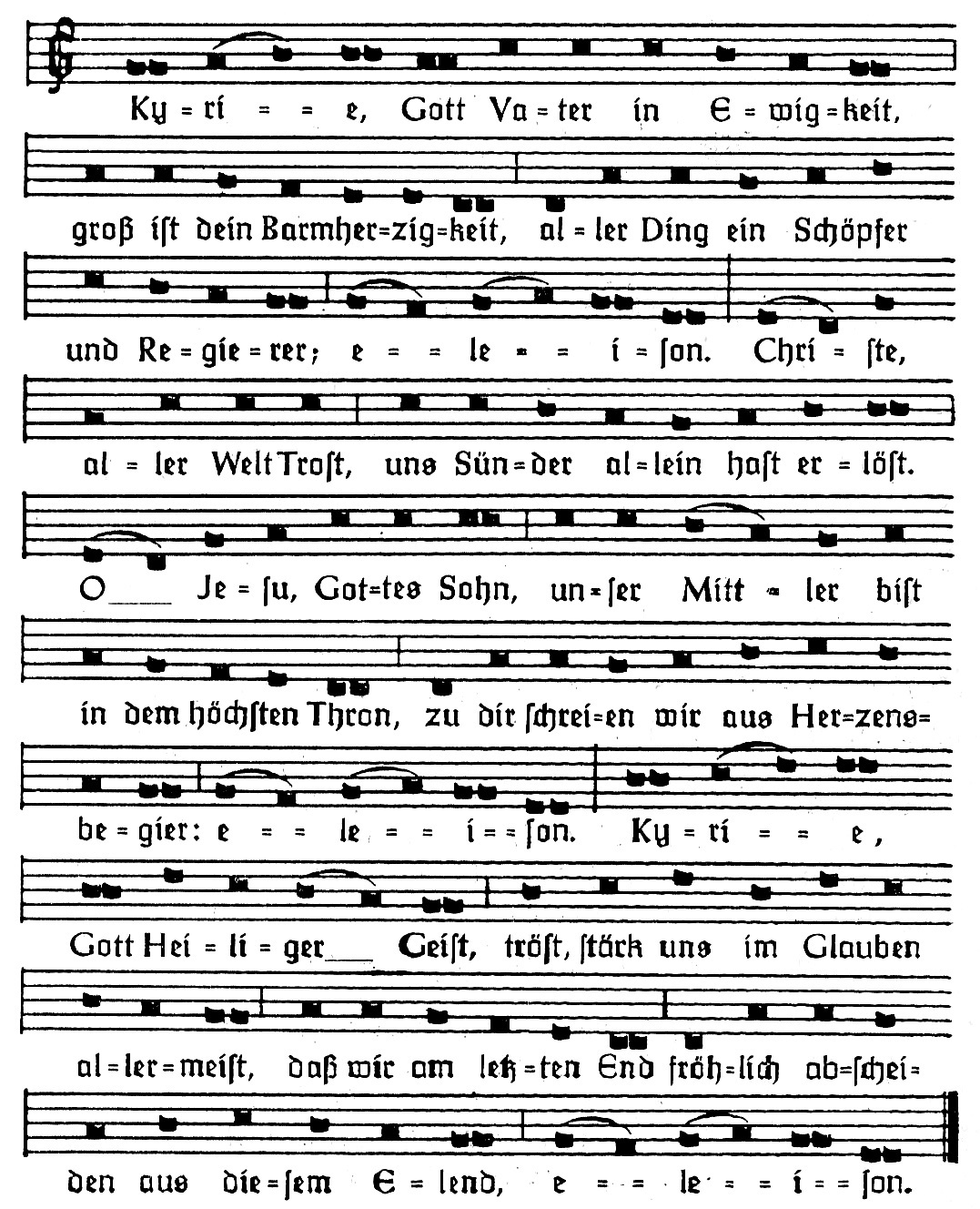
The Lutheran Kyrie, an adaptation of the Catholic Kyrie fons bonitatis, from the 1537 Naumburg hymnbook

The Kyrie was usually sung in Leipzig on Sundays after the opening organ prelude. Bach's three monumental pedaliter settings of the Kyrie correspond to the three verses. They are in strict counterpoint in the stile antico of Frescobaldi's Fiori Musicali. All three have portions of the same melody as their cantus firmus – in the soprano voice for "God the Father", in the middle tenor voice (en taille) for "God the Son" and in the pedal bass for "God the Holy Ghost". Although having features in common with Bach's vocal settings of the Kyrie, for example in his Missa in F major, BWV 233, the highly original musical style is tailored to organ technique, varying with each of the three chorale preludes. Nevertheless, as in other high-church settings of plainsong, Bach's writing remains "grounded in the unchangeable rules of harmony", as described in Fux's treatise on counterpoint, Gradus ad Parnassum." The solidity of his writing might have been a musical means of reflecting 'firmness in faith'. As Williams (2003) observes, "Common to all three movements is a certain seamless motion that rarely leads to full cadences or sequential repetition, both of which would be more diatonic than suits the desired transcendental style."

Below is the text of the three verses of Luther's version of the Kyrie with the English translation of Charles Sanford Terry:

Kyrie, Gott Vater in Ewigkeit,
groß ist dein Barmherzigkeit,
aller Ding ein Schöpfer und Regierer.
eleison!

Christe, aller Welt Trost
uns Sünder allein du hast erlöst;
Jesu, Gottes Sohn,
unser Mittler bist in dem höchsten Thron;
zu dir schreien wir aus Herzens Begier,
eleison!

Kyrie, Gott heiliger Geist,
tröst', stärk' uns im Glauben
allermeist daß wir am letzten End'
fröhlich abscheiden aus diesem Elend,
eleison!

O Lord the Father for evermore!
We Thy wondrous grace adore;
We confess Thy power, all worlds upholding.
Have mercy, Lord.

O Christ, our Hope alone,
Who with Thy blood didst for us atone;
O Jesu! Son of God!
Our Redeemer! our Advocate on high!
Lord, to Thee alone in our need we cry,
Have mercy, Lord.

Holy Lord, God the Holy Ghost!
Who of life and light the fountain art,
With faith sustain our heart,
That at the last we hence in peace depart.
Have mercy, Lord.

- BWV 669 Kyrie, Gott Vater (Kyrie, O God, Eternal Father)

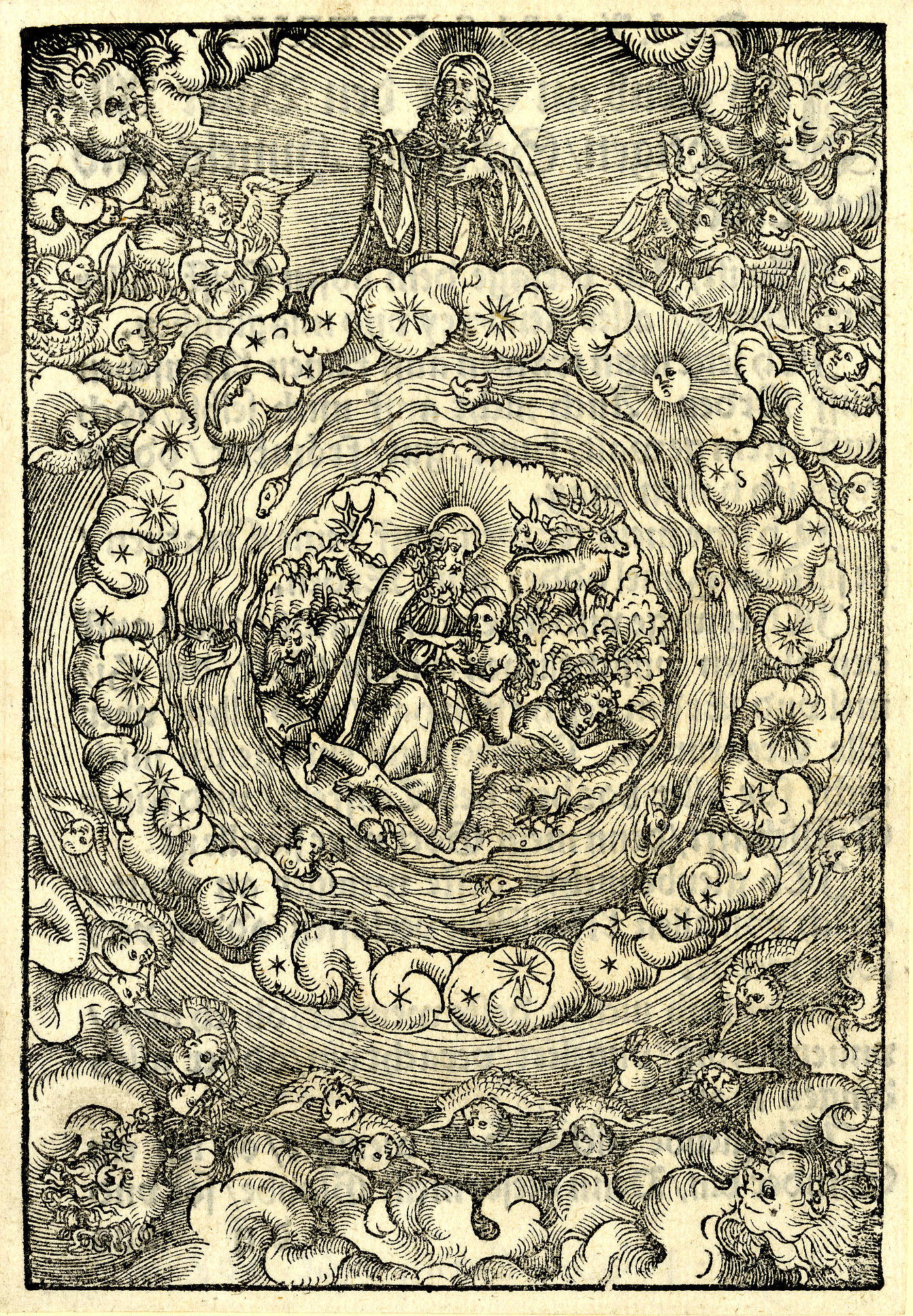
Lucas Cranach the Elder, 1527: woodcut of the Creation

BWV 669 is a chorale motet for two manuals and pedal in 4/2 time. The four lines of the cantus firmus in the phrygian mode of G are played in the top soprano part on one manual in semibreve beats. The single fugal theme of the other three parts, two in the second manual and one in the pedal, is in minim beats and based on the first two lines of the cantus firmus. The writing is in alla breve strict counterpoint, occasionally departing from the modal key to B♭ and E♭ major. Even when playing beneath the cantus firmus, the contrapuntal writing is quite elaborate. The many stile antico features include inversions, suspensions, strettos, use of dactyls and the canone sine pausa at the close, where the subject is developed without break in parallel thirds. Like the cantus firmus, the parts move in steps, creating an effortless smoothness in the chorale prelude.

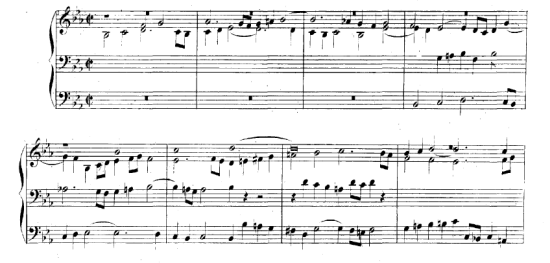

- BWV 670 Christe, aller Welt Trost (Christ, Comfort of all the world)

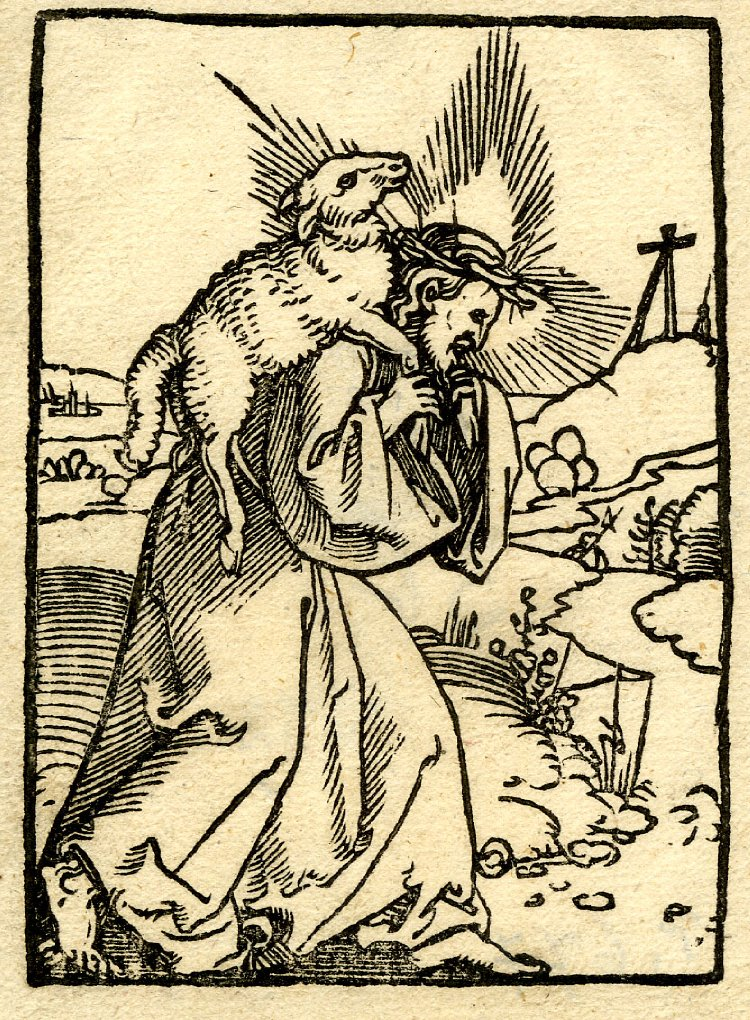
Sebald Beham, 1527: woodcut of Christ carrying the Lamb

BWV 670 is a chorale motet for two manuals and pedal in 4/2 time. The four lines of the cantus firmus in the phrygian mode of G are played in the tenor part (en taille) on one manual in semibreve beats. As in BWV 669, the single fugal theme of the other three parts, two in the second manual and one in the pedal, is in minim beats and based on the first two lines of the cantus firmus. The writing is again mostly modal, in alla breve strict counterpoint with similar stile antico features and a resulting smoothness. In this case, however, there are fewer inversions, the cantus firmus phrases are longer and freer, and the other parts more widely spaced, with canone sine pausa passages in sixths.

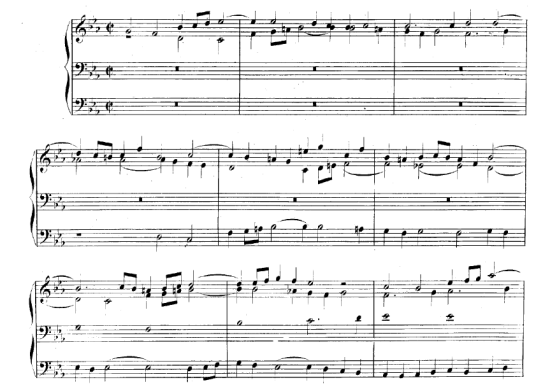

- BWV 671 Kyrie, Gott heiliger Geist (Kyrie, O God the Holy Ghost)

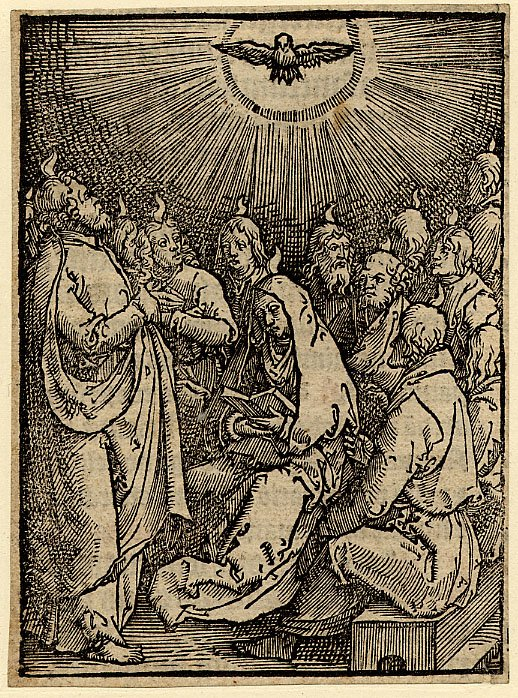
Lucas van Leyden, 1514: woodcut of Pentecost

BWV 671 is a chorale motet for organum plenum and pedal. The bass cantus firmus is in semibreves in the pedal with four parts above in the keyboard: tenor, alto and, exceptionally, two soprano parts, creating a unique texture. The subject of the four-part fugue in the manuals is derived from the first two lines of the cantus firmus and is answered by its inversion, typical of the stile antico. The quaver motifs in ascending and descending sequences, starting with dactyl figures and becoming increasingly continuous, swirling and scalelike, are a departure from the previous chorale preludes. Among the stile antico features are movement in steps and syncopation. Any tendency for the modal key to become diatonic is counteracted by the chromaticism of the final section where the flowing quavers come to a sudden end. Over the final line of the cantus firmus, the crotchet figures drop successively by semitones with dramatic and unexpected dissonances, recalling a similar but less extended passage at the end of the five-part chorale prelude O lux beata of Matthias Weckmann. As Williams (2003) suggests, the twelve descending chromatic steps seem like supplications, repeated cries of eleison—"have mercy".

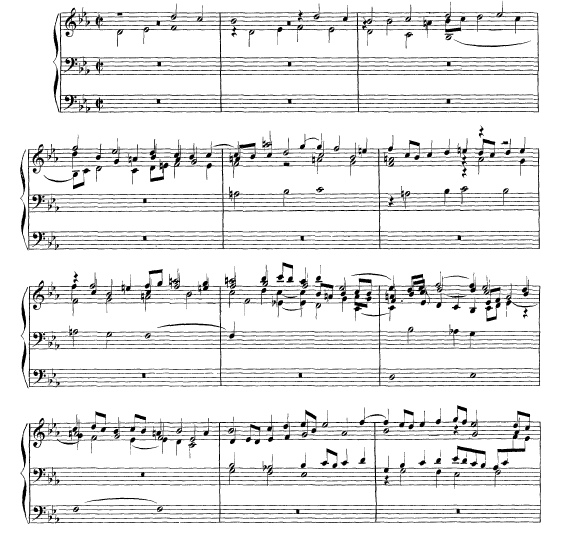

==== Manualiter settings of Kyrie BWV 672–674 ====
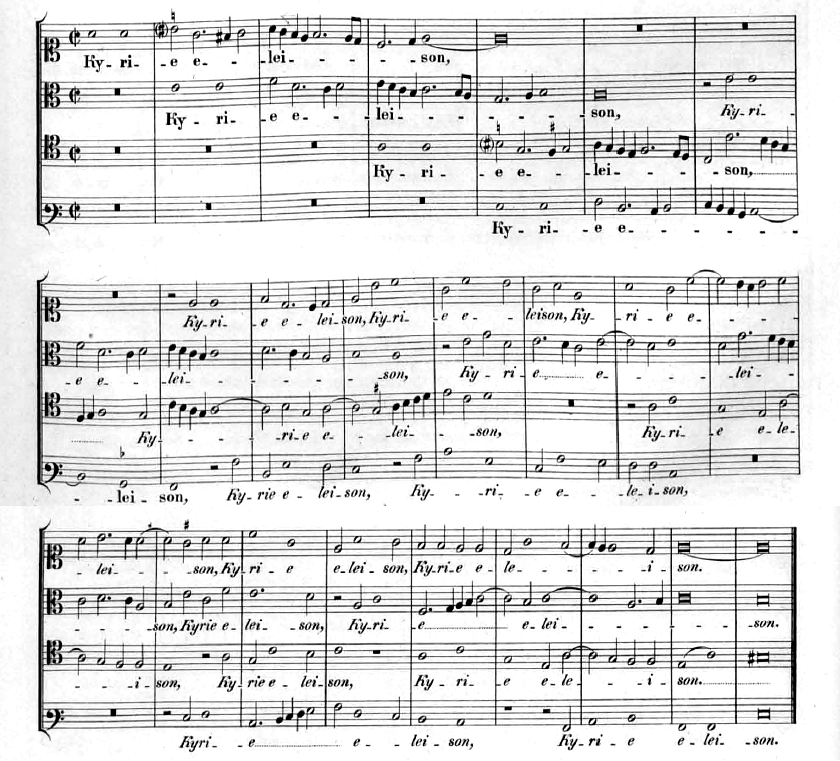
Second Kyrie in the phrygian mode of E from the Missa Sanctorum Meritis by Palestrina, 1594

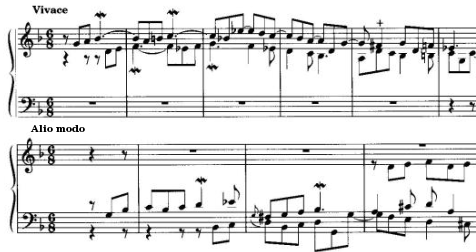
The Kyrie settings of Bach have similarities with two manualiter settings of "Nun komm, der Heiden Heiland" from Harmonische Seelenlust by Georg Friedrich Kauffmann, 1733

Phrygian is no other key than our A minor, the only difference being that it ends with the dominant chord E–G♯–B, as illustrated by the chorale Ach Gott, vom Himmel sieh darein [Cantata 153]. This technique of beginning and ending on the dominant chord can still be used nowadays, especially in those movements in which a concerto, symphony or sonata does not come to a full conclusion ... This type of ending awakens a desire to hear something additional.

— Georg Andreas Sorge, Anleitung zur Fantasie, 1767

The three manualiter chorale preludes BWV 672–674 are short fugal compositions within the tradition of the chorale fughetta, a form derived from the chorale motet in common use in Central Germany. Johann Christoph Bach, Bach's uncle and organist at Eisenach, produced 44 such fughettas. The brevity of the fughettas is thought to have been dictated by space limitations: they were added to the manuscript at a very late stage in 1739 to fill space between already engraved pedaliter settings. Despite their length and conciseness, the fughettas are all highly unconventional, original and smoothly flowing, sometimes with an other-worldly sweetness. As freely composed chorale preludes, the fugue subjects and motifs are based loosely on the beginning of each line of the cantus firmus, which otherwise does not figure directly. The motifs themselves are developed independently with the subtlety and inventiveness typical of Bach's later contrapuntal writing. Butt (2006) has suggested that the set might have been inspired by the cycle of five manualiter settings of "Nun komm, der Heiden Heiland" in Harmonische Seelenlust, published by his contemporary Georg Friedrich Kauffmann in 1733: BWV 673 and 674 employ similar rhythms and motifs to two of Kauffmann's chorale preludes.

The Kyries seem to have been conceived as a set, in conformity with the symbolism of the Trinity. This is reflected in the contrasting time signatures of 3/4, 6/8 and 9/8. They are also linked harmonically: all start in a major key and move to a minor key before the final cadence; the top part of each fughetta ends on a different note of the E major triad; and there is a matching between closing and beginning notes of successive pieces. What Williams (2003) has called the "new, transcendental quality" of these chorale fughettas is due in part to the modal writing. The cantus firmus in the phrygian mode of E is ill-suited to the standard methods of counterpoint, since entries of the subject in the dominant are precluded by the mode. This compositional problem, exacerbated by the choice of notes on which the pieces start and finish, was solved by Bach by having other keys as the dominating keys in each fughetta. This was a departure from established conventions for counterpoint in the phrygian mode, dating back to the mid-16th century ricercar from the time of Palestrina. As Bach's pupil Johann Kirnberger later remarked in 1771, "the great man departs from the rule in order to sustain good part-writing".

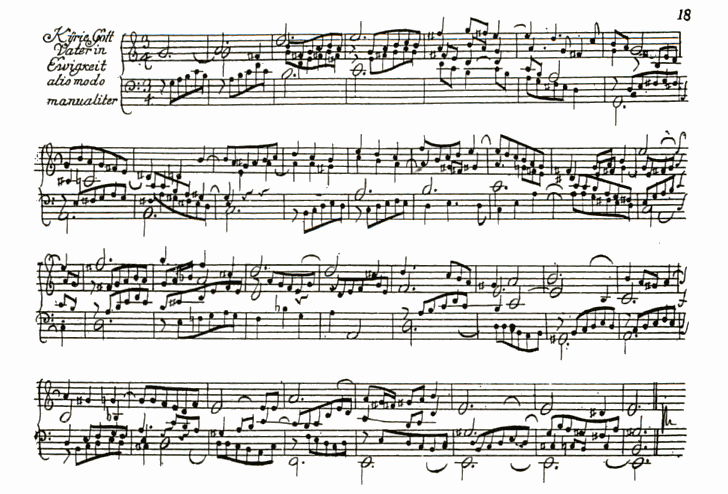
Kyrie Gott Vater BWV 672 in the original printing of 1739

- BWV 672 Kyrie, Gott Vater (Kyrie, O God, Eternal Father)

BWV 672 is a fughetta for four voices, 32 bars long. Although the movement starts in G major, the predominant tonal centre is A minor. The subject in dotted minims (G–A–B) and the quaver countersubject are derived from the first line of the cantus firmus, which also provides material for several cadences and a later descending quaver figure (bar 8 below). Some of the sequential writing resembles that of the B♭ major fugue BWV 890/2 in the second book of The Well-Tempered Clavier. Smoothness and mellifluousness result from what Williams (2003) has called the "liquefying effect" of the simple time signature of 3/4; from the use of parallel thirds in the doubling of subject and countersubject; from the clear tonalities of the four-part writing, progressing from G major to A minor, D minor, A minor and at the close E major; and from the softening effect of the occasional chromaticism, no longer dramatic as in the conclusion of the previous chorale prelude BWV 671.

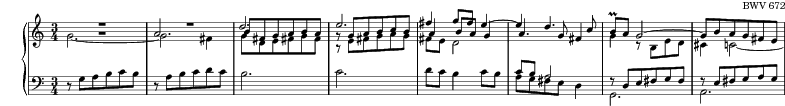

- BWV 673 Christe, aller Welt Trost (Christ, Comfort of all the world)

BWV 673 is a fughetta for four voices, 30 bars long, in compound 6/8 time. It has been described by Williams (2003) as "a movement of immense subtlety". The subject, three and a half bars long, is derived from the first line of the cantus firmus. The semiquaver scale motif in bar 4 is also related and is much developed throughout the piece. The countersubject, which is taken from the subject itself, uses the same syncopated leaping motif as the earlier Jesus Christus unser Heiland BWV 626 from the Orgelbüchlein, similar to gigue-like figures used earlier by Buxtehude in his chorale prelude Auf meinen lieben Gott BuxWV 179; it has been interpreted as symbolising the triumph of the risen Christ over death. In contrast to the preceding fughetta, the writing in BWV 673 has a playful lilting quality, but again it is modal, unconventional, inventive and non-formulaic, even if governed throughout by aspects of the cantus firmus. The fughetta starts in the key of C major, modulating to D minor, then moving to A minor before the final cadence. Fluidity comes from the many passages with parallel thirds and sixths. Original features of the contrapuntal writing include the variety of entries of the subject (all notes of the scale except G), which occur in stretto and in canon.

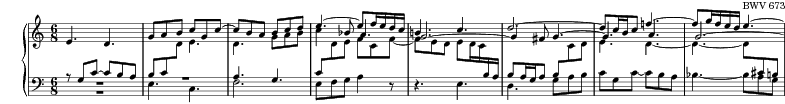

- BWV 674 Kyrie, Gott heiliger Geist (Kyrie, O God the Holy Ghost)

BWV 674 is a fughetta for four voices, 34 bars long, in compound 9/8 time. The writing is again smooth, inventive and concise, moulded by the cantus firmus in E phrygian. The quaver motif in the third bar recurs throughout the movement, often in thirds and sixths, and is developed more than the quaver theme in the first bar. The constant quaver texture might be a reference to the last eleison in the plainchant. The movement starts in G major passing to A minor, then briefly C major, before moving back to A minor before the final cadence to an E major triad. As Williams (1980) explains, "The so-called modality lies in a kind of diatonic ambiguity exemplified in the cadence, suggested by the key signature, and borne out in the kinds of lines and imitation."

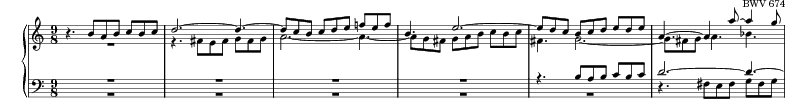

==== Allein Gott in der Höh' BWV 675–677 ====
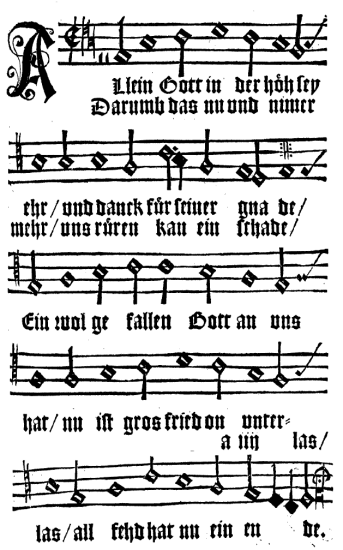
Allein Gott in der Höh sei Ehr, an adaptation of the Gloria in excelsis by Nikolaus Decius (1522), from Johann Spangenberg's Kirchengesenge Deudsch (Magdeburg, 1545)

Almost invariably Bach uses the melody to express the adoration of the Angelic hosts, and in scale passages pictures the throng of them ascending and descending between earth and heaven.

— Charles Sanford Terry, Bach Chorales, 1921

Herr Krügner of Leipzig was introduced and recommended to me by Cappelmeister Bach, but he had to excuse himself because he had accepted the Kauffmann pieces for publication and would not be able to complete them for a long time. Also the costs run too high.

— Johann Gottfried Walther, letter written on January 26, 1736

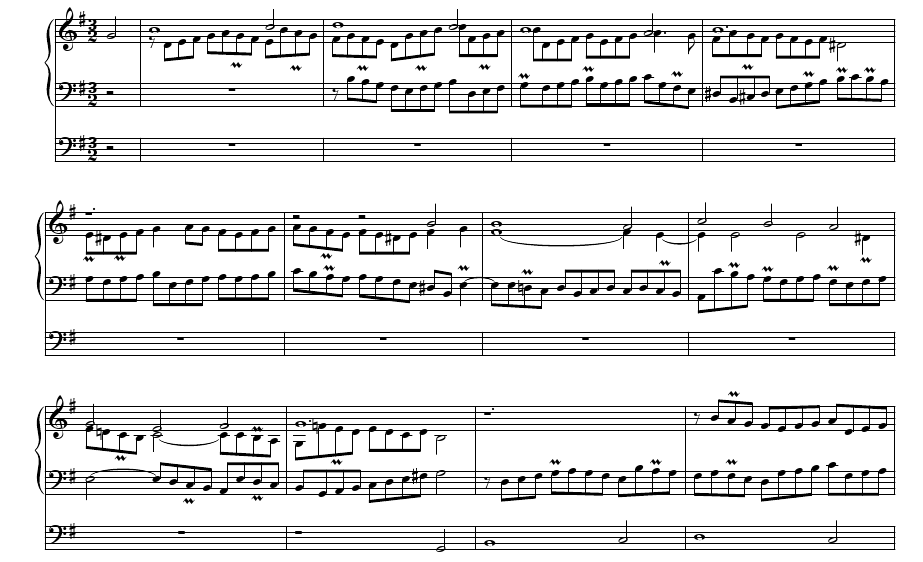
Fifth setting of Allein Gott by Johann Gottfried Walther, 1736

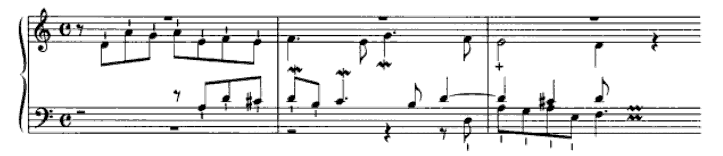
Wir glauben all an einen Gott by Georg Friedrich Kauffmann, 1733–36

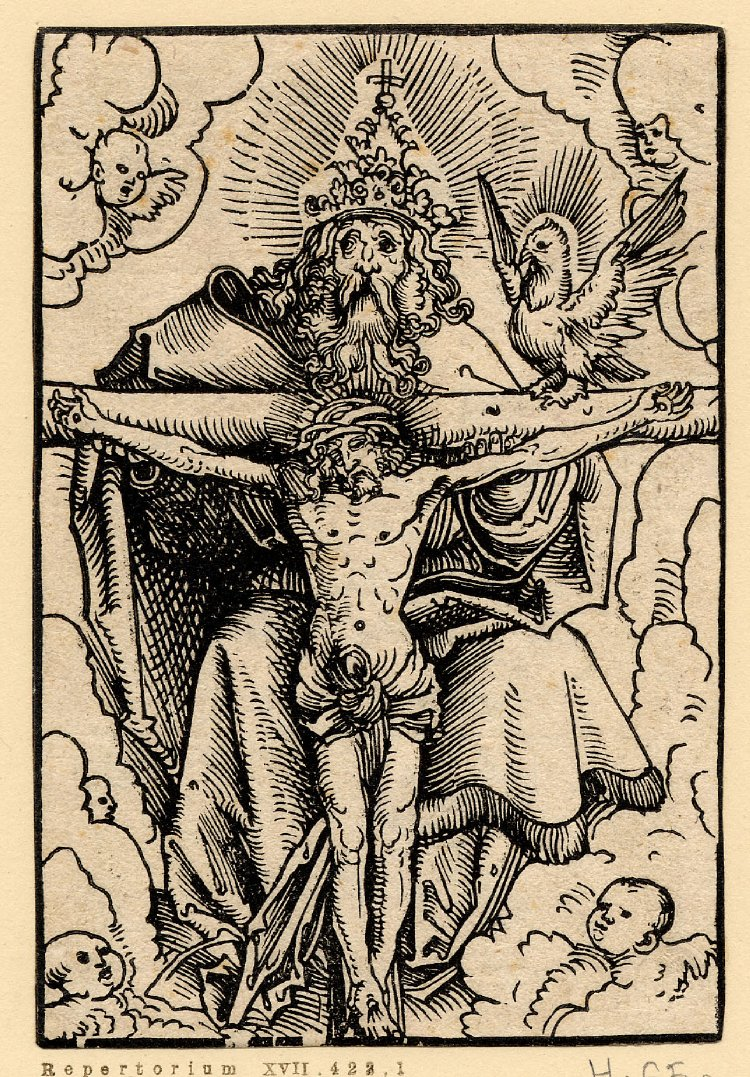
Lucas Cranach the Elder, 1512: woodcut of the Holy Trinity

Bach's three settings of the German Gloria/Trinity hymn Allein Gott in der Höh' again make allusion to the Trinity: in the succession of keys—F, G and A—possibly echoed in the opening notes of the first setting BWV 675; in the time signatures; and in the number of bars allocated to various sections of movements. The three chorale preludes give three completely different treatments: the first a manualiter trio with the cantus firmus in the alto; the second a pedaliter trio sonata with hints of the cantus firmus in the pedal, similar in style to Bach's six trio sonatas for organ BWV 525–530; and the last a three-part manualiter fughetta with themes derived from the first two lines of the melody. Earlier commentators considered some of the settings to be "not quite worthy" of their place in Clavier-Übung III, particularly the "much-maligned" BWV 675, which Hermann Keller considered could have been written during Bach's period in Weimar. More recent commentators have confirmed that all three pieces conform to the general principles Bach adopted for the collection, in particular their unconventionality and the "strangeness" of the counterpoint. Williams (2003) and Butt (2006) have pointed out the possible influence of Bach's contemporaries on his musical language. Bach was familiar with the eight versions of Allein Gott by his cousin Johann Gottfried Walther as well as the Harmonische Seelenlust of Georg Friedrich Kauffmann, posthumously printed by Bach's Leipzig printer Krügner. In BWV 675 and 677 there are similarities with some of Kauffmann's galant innovations: triplets against duplets in the former; and explicit articulation by detached quavers in the latter. The overall style of BWV 675 has been compared to Kauffmann's setting of Nun ruhen alle Wälder; that of BWV 676 to the fifth of Walther's own settings of Allein Gott; and BWV 677 has many details in common with Kauffmann's fughetta on Wir glauben all an einen Gott.

Below is the text of the four verses of Luther's version of the Gloria with the English translation of Charles Sanford Terry:

Allein Gott in der Höh' sei Ehr'
und Dank für seine Gnade,
darum daß nun und nimmermehr
uns rühren kann kein Schade.
ein Wohlgefall'n Gott an uns hat,
nun ist groß' Fried' ohn' Unterlaß,
all' Fehd' hat nun ein Ende.

Wir loben, preis'n, anbeten dich
für deine Ehr'; wir danken,
daß du, Gott Vater ewiglich
regierst ohn' alles Wanken.
ganz ungemeß'n ist deine Macht,
fort g'schieht, was dein Will' hat bedacht;
wohl uns des feinen Herren!

O Jesu Christ, Sohn eingebor'n
deines himmlischen Vaters,
versöhner der'r, die war'n verlor'n,
du Stiller unsers Haders,
Lamm Gottes, heil'ger Herr und Gott,
nimm an die Bitt' von unsrer Not,
erbarm' dich unser aller!

O Heil'ger Geist, du höchstes Gut,
du allerheilsamst' Tröster,
vor's Teufels G'walt fortan behüt',
die Jesus Christ erlöset
durch große Mart'r und bittern Tod,
abwend all unsern Jamm'r und Not!
darauf wir uns verlaßen.

To God on high all glory be,
And thanks, that He's so gracious,
That hence to all eternity
No evil shall oppress us:
His word declares good-will to men,
On earth is peace restored again
Through Jesus Christ our Saviour.

We humbly Thee adore, and praise,
And laud for Thy great glory:
Father, Thy kingdom lasts always,
Not frail, nor transitory:
Thy power is endless as Thy praise,
Thou speak'st, the universe obeys:
In such a Lord we're happy.

O Jesus Christ, enthroned on high,
The Father's Son beloved
By Whom lost sinners are brought nigh,
And guilt and curse removed;
Thou Lamb once slain, our God and Lord,
To needy prayers Thine ear afford,
And on us all have mercy.

O Comforter, God Holy Ghost,
Thou source of consolation,
From Satan's power Thou wilt, we trust,
Protect Christ's congregation,
His everlasting truth assert,
All evil graciously avert,
Lead us to life eternal.

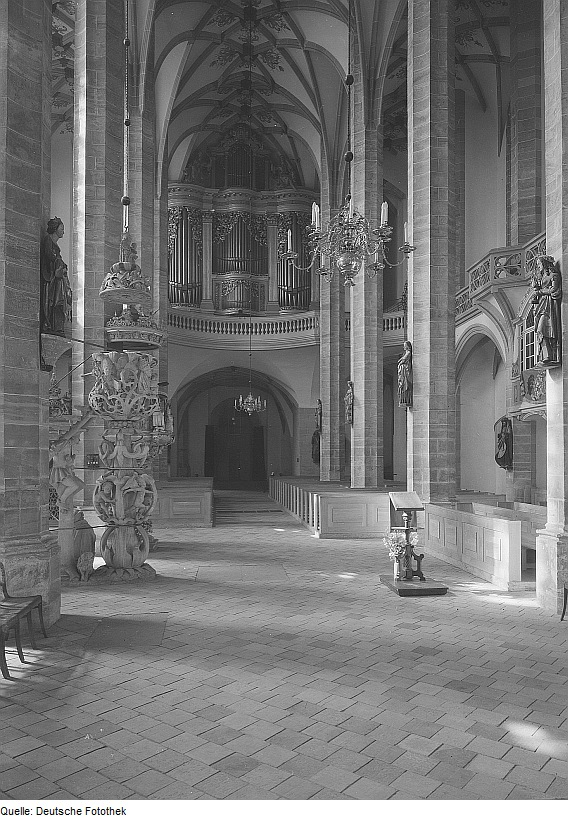
Silbermann organ (1710–1714) in Freiberg Cathedral

- BWV 675 Allein Gott in der Höh' (All glory be to God on high)

BWV 675, 66 bars long, is a two-part invention for the upper and lower voices with the cantus firmus in the alto part. The two outer parts are intricate and rhythmically complex with wide leaps, contrasting with the cantus firmus which moves smoothly by steps in minims and crotchets. The 3/4 time signature has been taken to be one of the references in this movement to the Trinity. Like the two preceding chorale preludes, there is no explicit manualiter marking, only an ambiguous "a 3": performers are left with the choice of playing on a single keyboard or on two keyboards with a 4 ft (1.2 m) pedal, the only difficulty arising from the triplets in bar 28. The movement is in bar form (AAB) with bar lengths of sections divisible by 3: the 18 bar stollen has 9 bars with and without the cantus firmus and the 30 bar abgesang has 12 bars with the cantus firmus and 18 without it. The invention theme provides a fore-imitation of the cantus firmus, subsuming the same notes and bar lengths as each corresponding phase. The additional motifs in the theme are ingeniously developed throughout the piece: the three rising starting notes; the three falling triplets in bar 2; the leaping octaves at the beginning of bar 3; and the quaver figure in bar 4. These are playfully combined in ever-changing ways with the two motifs from the counter subject—the triplet figure at the end of bar 5 and the semiquaver scale at the beginning of bar 6—and their inversions. At the end of each stollen and the abgesang, the complexity of the outer parts lessens, with simple triplet descending scale passages in the soprano and quavers in the bass. The harmonisation is similar to that in Bach's Leipzig cantatas, with the keys shifting between major and minor.

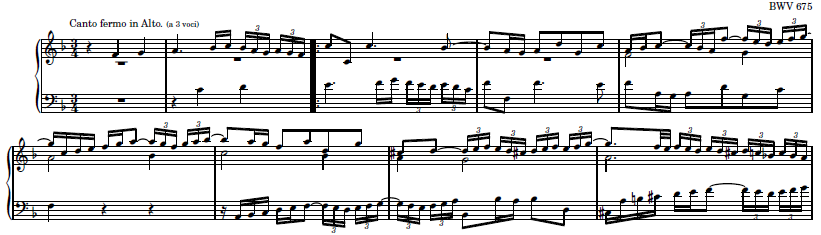

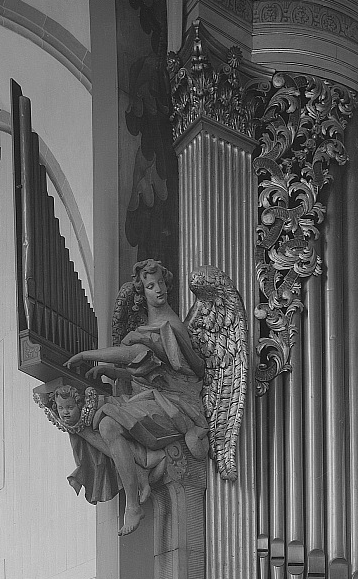
Detail of the Silbermann organ in Freiberg Cathedral

- BWV 676 Allein Gott in der Höh' (All glory be to God on high)

BWV 676 is a trio sonata for two keyboards and pedal, 126 bars long. The melody of the hymn is omnipresent in the cantus firmus, the paraphrase in the subject of the upper parts and in the harmony. The compositional style and detail—charming and galant—are similar to those of the trio sonatas for organ BWV 525–530. The chorale prelude is easy on the ear, belying its technical difficulty. It departs from the trio sonatas in having a ritornello form dictated by the lines of the cantus firmus, which in this case uses an earlier variant with the last line identical to the second. This feature and the length of the lines themselves account for the unusual length of BWV 676.

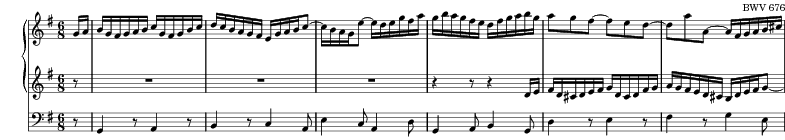

The musical form of BWV 676 can be analysed as follows:

- bars 1–33: exposition, with left hand following right and the first two lines of the cantus firmus in the left hand in bars 12 and 28.
- bars 33–66: repeat of exposition, with right hand and left hand interchanged
- bars 66–78: episode with syncopated sonata-like figures
- bars 78–92: third and fourth lines of cantus firmus in canon between the pedal and each of the two hands, with a countertheme derived from trio subject in the other hand
- bars 92–99: episode similar to passage in first exposition
- bars 100–139: last line of cantus firmus in the left hand, then the right hand, the pedal and finally the right hand, before the final pedal point, over which the trio theme returns in the right hand against scale-like figures in the left hand, creating a somewhat inconclusive ending:

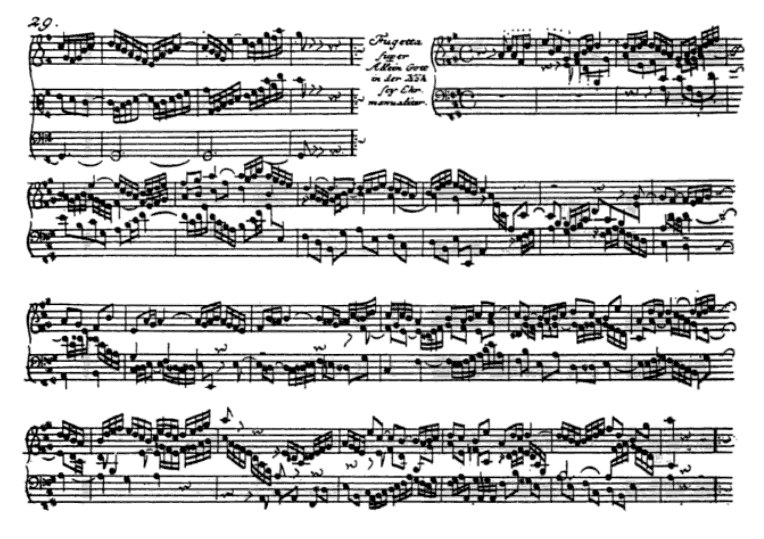
BWV 677, after conclusion of BWV 676, from 1739 print

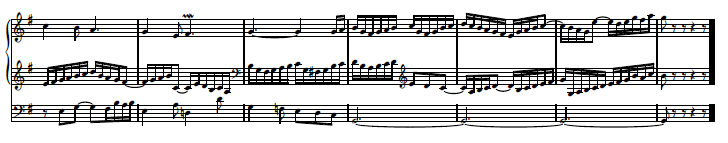

- BWV 677 Allein Gott in der Höh' (All glory be to God on high)

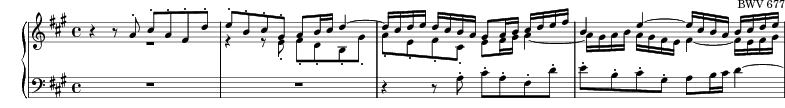
BWV 677 is a double fughetta, 20 bars long. In the first five bars the first subject, based on the first line of the cantus firmus, and countersubject are heard in stretto, with a response in bars 5 to 7. The originality of the complex musical texture is created by pervasive but unobtrusive references to the cantus firmus and the smooth semiquaver motif from the first half of bar 3, which recurs throughout the piece and contrasts with the detached quavers of the first subject.

The contrasting second subject, based on the second line of the cantus firmus, starts in the alto part on the last quaver of bar 7:

The two subjects and the semiquaver motif are combined from bar 16 to the close. Examples of musical iconography include the minor triad in the opening subject and the descending scales in the first half of bar 16—references to the Trinity and the heavenly host.

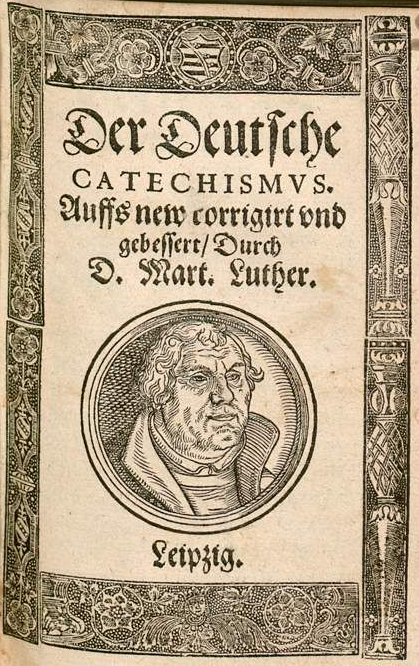
Luther's Large Catechism, Leipzig 1560

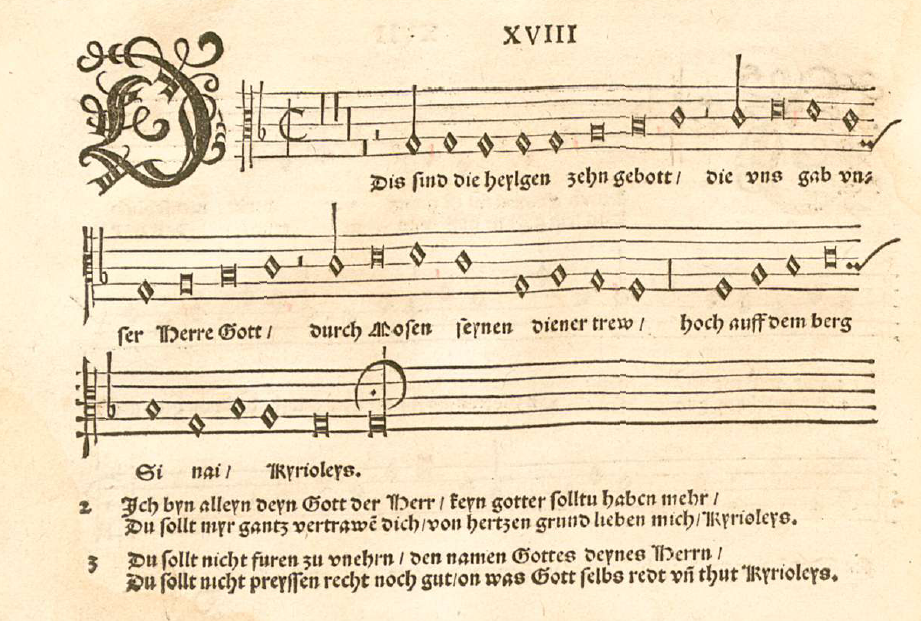
The Ten Commandments in the 1524 hymnbook of Luther and Walter

=== Chorale preludes BWV 678–689 (Luther's catechism chorales) ===
Careful examination of the original manuscript has shown that the large scale chorale preludes with pedal, including those on the six catechism hymns, were the first to be engraved. The smaller manualiter settings of the catechism hymns and the four duets were added later in the remaining spaces, with the first five catechism hymns set as three-part fughettas and the last as a longer four-part fugue. It is possible that Bach, in order to increase the accessibility of the collection, conceived these additions as pieces that could be played on domestic keyboard instruments. Even for a single keyboard, however, they present difficulties: in the preface to his own collection of chorale preludes published in 1750, the organist and composer Georg Andreas Sorge wrote that, "the preludes on the catechism chorales of Herr Capellmeister Bach in Leipzig are examples of this kind of keyboard piece that deserve the great renown that they enjoy," adding that "works such as these are so difficult as to be all but unusable to young beginners and others who lack the considerable proficiency they require".

==== The Ten Commandments BWV 678, 679 ====
- BWV 678 Dies sind die heil'gen zehn Gebot (These are the holy Ten Commandments)

Below is the text of the first verse of Luther's hymn with the English translation by Charles Sanford Terry:

Dies sind die heil'gen zehn Gebot,
die uns gab unser Herr Gott
durch Mosen, seiner Diener treu.
hoch auf dem Berge Sinai.
Kyrieleis!

These are the holy ten commands,
Which came to us from God's own hands,
By Moses, who obeyed His will,
On the top of Sinai's hill.
Kyrieleis.

The prelude is in the mixolydian mode of G, ending on a plagal cadence in G minor. The ritornello is in the upper parts and bass on the upper manual and pedal, with the cantus firmus in canon at the octave on the lower manual. There are ritornello episodes and five entries of the Cantus firmus, yielding the number of commandments. The distribution of parts, two parts in each keyboard and one in the pedal is similar to that of the de Grigny Livre d'Orgue, although Bach makes much greater technical demands on the right hand part.

Commentators have seen the canon as representing order, with the pun on canon as "law". As also expressed in Luther's verses, the two voices of the canon have been seen as symbolising the new law of Christ and the old law of Moses, which it echoes. The pastoral quality in the organ writing for the upper voices at the opening has been interpreted as representing the serenity before the Fall of Man; it is followed by the disorder of sinful waywardness; and finally order is restored in the closing bars with the calm of salvation.

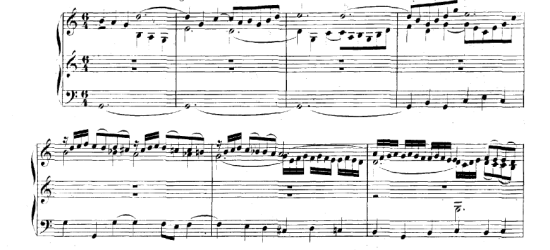

The upper part and pedal engage in an elaborate and highly developed fantasia based on motifs introduced in the ritornello at the beginning of the chorale prelude. These motifs recur either in their original form or inverted. There are six motifs in the upper part:

- the three crotchets at beginning of bar 1 above
- the dotted minim in the second part of bar 1 above
- the six note quaver figure in the two halves of bar 3 above
- the phrase of three semiquavers and two pairs of "sighing" quavers in bar 5 above
- the semiquaver passagework in the second half of bar 5 above
- the semiquaver passage work in the second half of the second bar below (first heard in bar 13)

and five in the bass:

- the three crotchets at the beginning of bar 4 above
- the two crotchets dropping by an octave at the beginning of bar 5 above
- the phrase in the second part of bar 5 above
- the three note scale in the second, third and fourth crotchets of bar 6 above
- the last three crotchets in bar 7 above.

The writing for the two upper voices is similar to that for obligato instruments in a cantata: their musical material is independent of the chorale, The opening pedal G on the other hand can be heard as a foretaste of the repeated Gs in the cantus firmus. In between the cantus firmus is sung in canon at the octave on the second manual. The fifth and final entry of the cantus firmus is in the distant key of B♭ major (G minor): it expresses the purity of the Kyrie eleison at the end of the first verse, which brings the prelude to a harmonious close:

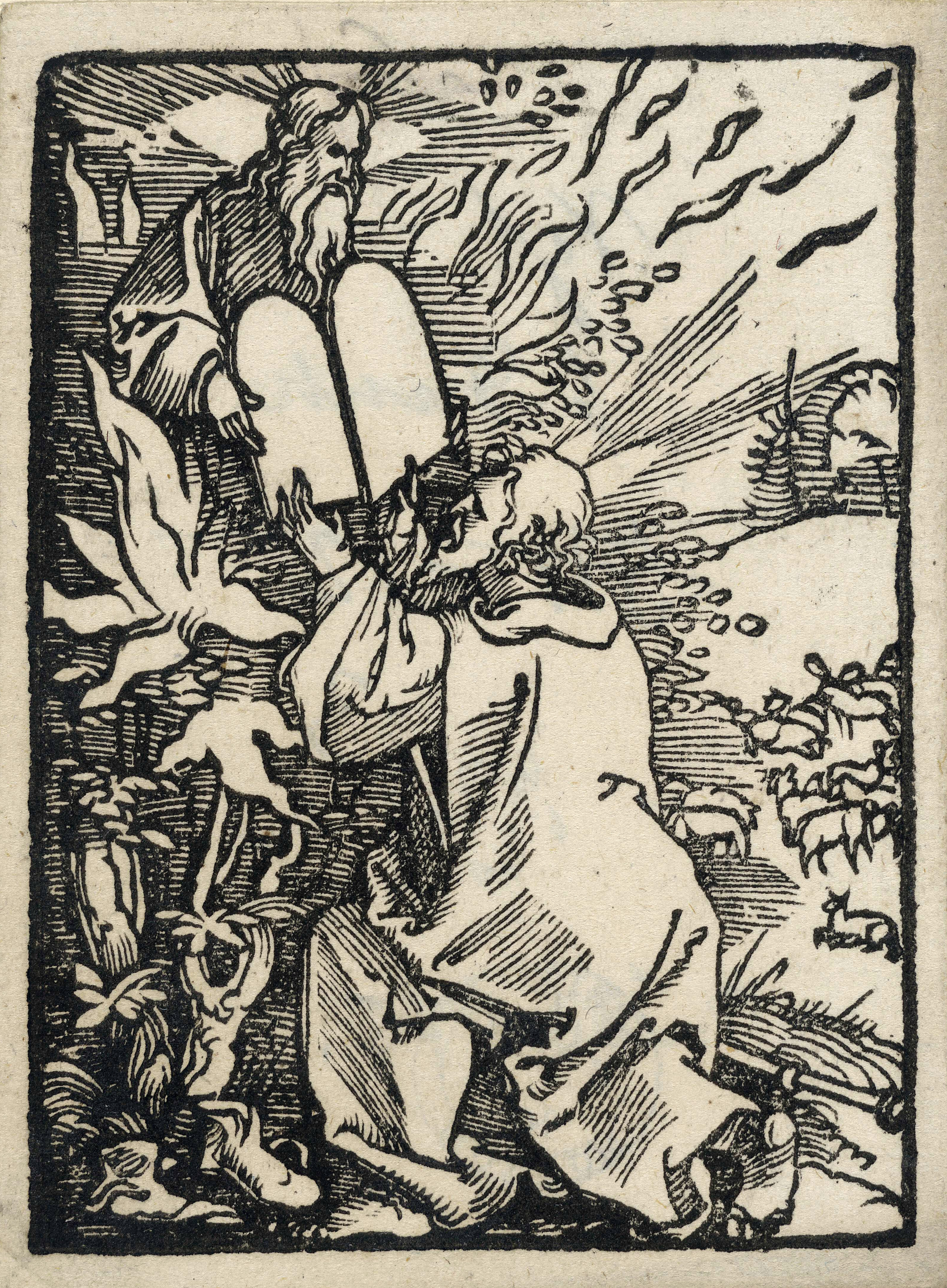
Sebald Beham, 1527: woodcut in Luther's prayer book of Moses receiving the Ten Commandments

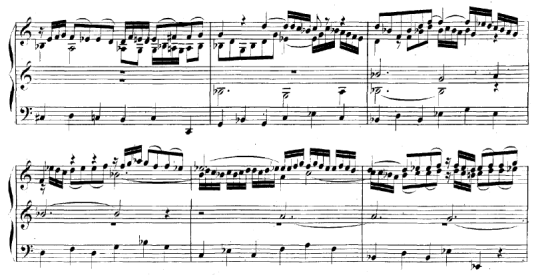

- BWV 679 Dies sind die heil'gen zehn Gebot (These are the holy Ten Commandments)

The lively gigue-like fughetta has several similarities to the larger chorale prelude: it is in the mixolydian mode of G; it starts with a pedal point of repeated Gs; the number ten occurs as the number of entries of the subject (four of them inverted); and the piece ends on a plagal cadence. The motifs in the second half of the second bar and the countersubject are extensively developed. The liveliness of the fughetta has been taken to reflect Luther's exhortation in the Small Catechism to do "cheerfully what He has commanded." Equally well, Psalm 119 speaks of "delighting ... in His statutes" and rejoicing in the Law.

==== The Creed BWV 680, 681 ====
- BWV 680 Wir glauben all' an einen Gott (We all believe in one God)

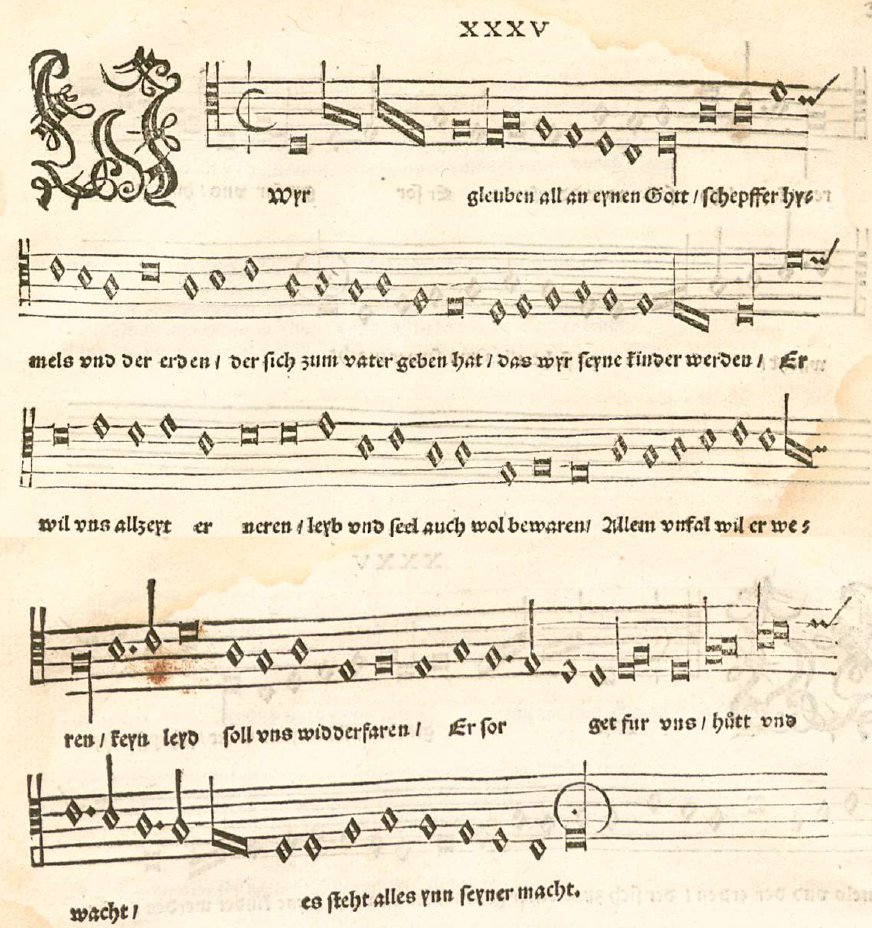
Wir glauben in the 1524 hymnbook of Luther and Walter

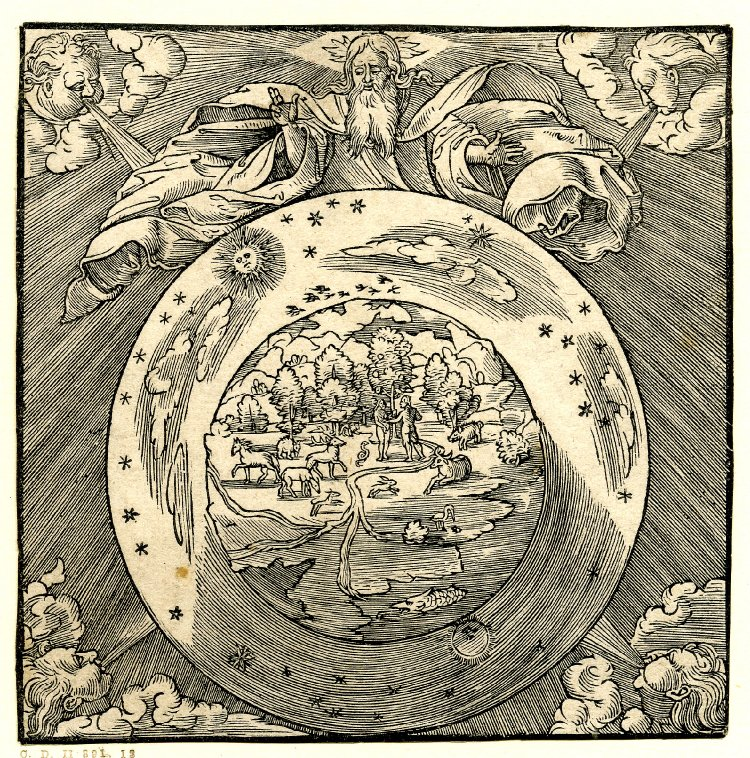
Hans Brosamer, 1550: woodcut in Luther's Small Catechism of God, the Creator

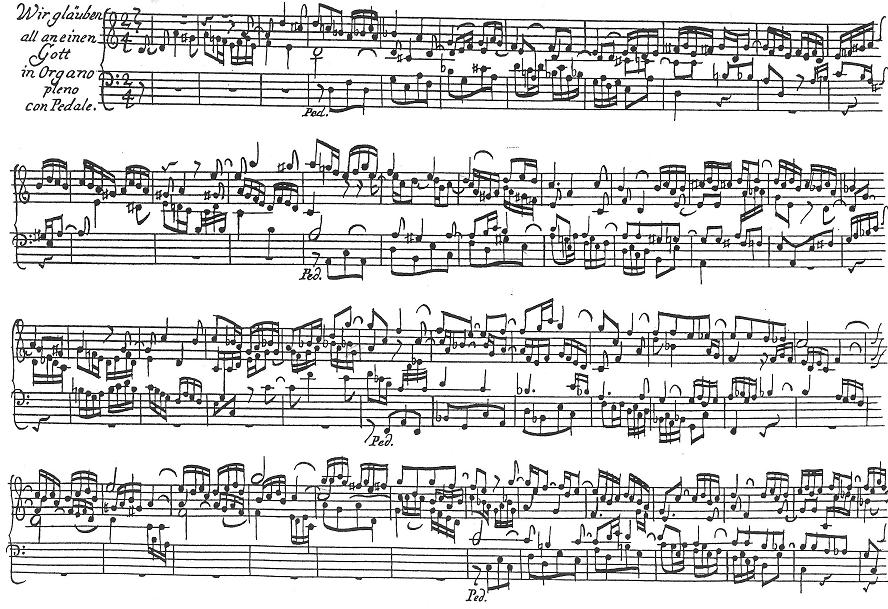
First page of original print of BWV 680

Below is the text of the first verse of Luther's hymn with the English translation by Charles Sanford Terry:

Wir glauben all' an einen Gott,
Schöpfer Himmels und der Erden,
der sich zum Vater geben hat,
dass wir seine Kinder werden.
Er will uns allzeit ernähren,
Leib und Seel auch wohl bewahren,
allem Unfall will er wehren
kein Leid soll uns widerfahren.
Er sorgt für uns, hüt und wacht,
es steht alles in seiner Macht.

We all believe in One true God,
Maker of the earth and heaven;
The Father Who to us in love
Hath the claim of children given.
He in soul and body feeds us,
All we want His hand provides us,
Through all snares and perils leads us,
Watches that no harm betides us;
He cares for us by day and night,
All things are governed by His might.

The chorale prelude in four parts is a fugue in the Dorian mode of D, with the subject based on the first line of Luther's hymn. The prominent counter-subject is first heard in the pedal bass. According to Peter Williams, the chorale prelude is written in the stilo antico Italian style reminiscent of Girolamo Frescobaldi and Giovanni Battista Bassani. Italian elements are apparent in the trio-sonata structure, which combines the upper fugal parts with the ostinato figured bass; and in the ingenious use of the full range of Italianate semiquaver motifs. The five notes in the original hymn for the opening melisma on Wir are expanded in the first two bars and the remaining notes are used for the countersubject. There is exceptionally no cantus firmus, probably because of the exceptional length of the hymn. Features of the remainder of the hymn, however, suffuse the writing, in particular the scale-like passages and the melodic leaps. The fugue counter-subject is adapted to the pedal as a vigorous striding bass with alternate footwork; its quasi-ostinato character has been consistently interpreted as representing a "firm faith in God": a striding bass line was often used by Bach for Credo movements, for example in the Credo and Confiteor of the Mass in B Minor. After each occurrence of the ostinato counter-subject in the pedal, there is a semiquaver bridging passage (bars 8–9, 19–20, 31–32, 44–45, 64–66) in which the music modulates into a different key while the three upper parts play in invertible counterpoint: in this way the three different melodic lines can be freely interchanged between the three voices. These highly original transitional passages punctuate the work and give a coherence to the whole movement. Although the added G♯ makes it difficult to recognize the chorale melody, it can be heard more clearly later on, singing out in the tenor part. In the final manualiter episode (bars 76–83) the ostinato pedal figures are taken up briefly by the tenor part before the movement draws to a close over a final extended restatement of the fugue counter-subject in the pedal.
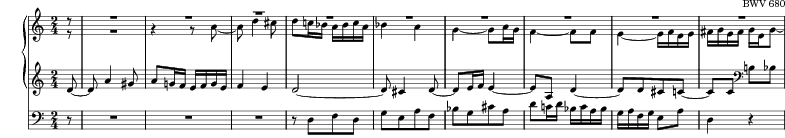
The American musicologist David Yearsley has described the chorale prelude as follows: "This energetic, syncopated counterpoint is elaborated above a recurring two-bar theme in the pedal that acts like a ritornello whose continual reappearances are separated by lengthy rests. The ostinato remains constant through the various key-changes that present it in both major and minor mode [...] The shape of the pedal line suggests an archetypal narrative of ascent and descent in perfect symmetry [...] The figure forcefully projects the movements of the feet into the church; heard on full organ (In Organo pleno, according to Bach's own performance direction) with a registration of all due Gravitas, the feet move with real purpose [...] Wir glauben all' is truly a walker's piece at the organ."

- BWV 681 Wir glauben all' an einen Gott (We all believe in one God)

The manualiter fughetta in E minor is both the shortest movement in Clavier-Übung III and the exact midpoint of the collection. The subject paraphrases the first line of the chorale; the two-bar passage later in the movement leading to two dramatic diminished seventh chords is constructed over the second chorale line. Although not strictly a French ouverture, the movement does incorporate elements of that style, in particular the dotted rhythms. Here Bach follows his custom of beginning the second half of a major collection with a French-style movement (as in the other three Clavier-Übung volumes, in both volumes of Das Wohltemperierte Clavier, in the early manuscript version of Die Kunst der Fuge and in the group of five numbered canons in the Musikalisches Opfer). It also complements the preceding chorale prelude by following an Italian style with a contrasting French one. Although still evidently written for organ, in style it most resembles the Gigue for harpsichord from the first French Suite in D minor BWV 812.

==== The Lord's Prayer BWV 682, 683 ====
- BWV 682 Vater unser im Himmelreich (Our Father who art in heaven)

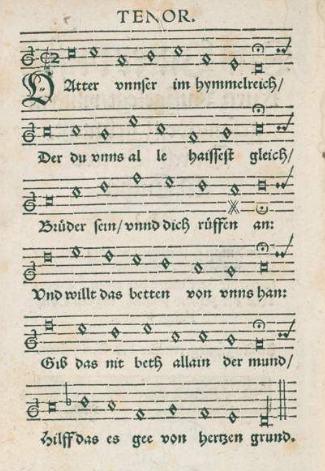
Vater unser im Himmelreich from Luther's prayerbook of 1545

Below is the text of the first verse of Luther's hymn with the English translation by Charles Sanford Terry:

Vater unser im Himmelreich,
der du uns alle heissest gleich
Brüder sein und dich rufen an
und willst das Beten vor uns ha'n,
gib, dass nicht bet allein der Mund,
hilf, dass es geh' aus Herzensgrund.

Our Father in the heaven Who art,
Who tellest all of us in heart
Brothers to be, and on Thee call,
And wilt have prayer from us all,
Grant that the mouth not only pray,
From deepest heart oh help its way.

Likewise the Spirit also helpeth our infirmities: for we know not what we should pray for as we ought: but the Spirit itself maketh intercession for us with groanings which cannot be uttered.

— Romans 8:26

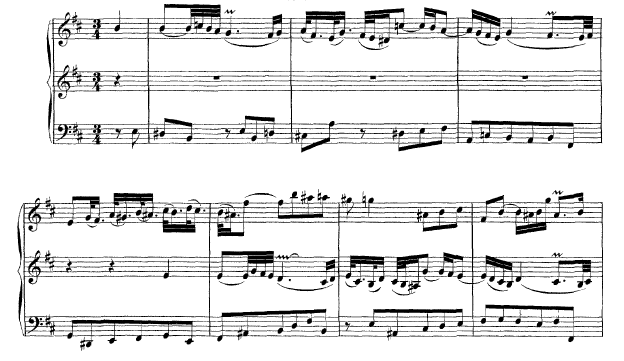

Vater unser im Himmelreich BWV 682 in E minor has long been considered the most complex of Bach's chorale preludes, difficult at the levels of both understanding and performance. Through a ritornello trio sonata in the modern French galante style, the German chorale of the first verse is heard in canon at the octave, almost subliminally, played in each hand together with the obligato instrumental solo. Bach had already mastered such a compound form in the choral fantasia opening his cantata Jesu, der du meine Seele, BWV 78. The canon could be a reference to the Law, the adherence to which Luther saw as one of the purposes of prayer.

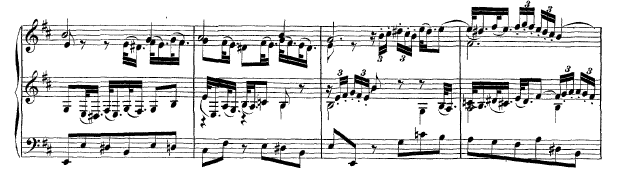

The galante style in the upper parts is reflected in their lombardic rhythms and detached semiquaver triplets, sometimes played against semiquavers, typical of French flute music of the time. Below, the pedal plays a restless continuo, with constantly changing motifs. On the technical side, the suggestion of the German musicologist Hermann Keller that BWV 682 required four manuals and two players has not been accepted. As Bach emphasised to his students, however, articulation was all-important: dotted figures and triplets had to be distinguished and should only come together when the "music is extremely fast".

The theme in the upper parts is an elaborate coloratura version of the hymn, like the instrumental solos in the slow movements of trio sonatas or concertos. Its wandering, sighing nature has been taken to represent the unsaved soul in search of God's protection. It has three key elements which are developed extensively in the prelude: the lombardic rhythms in bar 3; the chromatic descending phrase between bars 5 and 6; and the detached semiquaver triplets in bar 10. Bach already used lombardic rhythms in the early 1730s, in particular in some early versions of the Domine Deus of the Mass in B minor from his cantata Gloria in excelsis Deo, BWV 191. The mounting lombardic figures have been interpreted as representing "hope" and "trust" and the anguished chromaticism as "patience" and "suffering". At the climax of the work in bar 41, the chromaticism reaches its most extreme in the upper parts as the lombardic rhythms pass to the pedal:

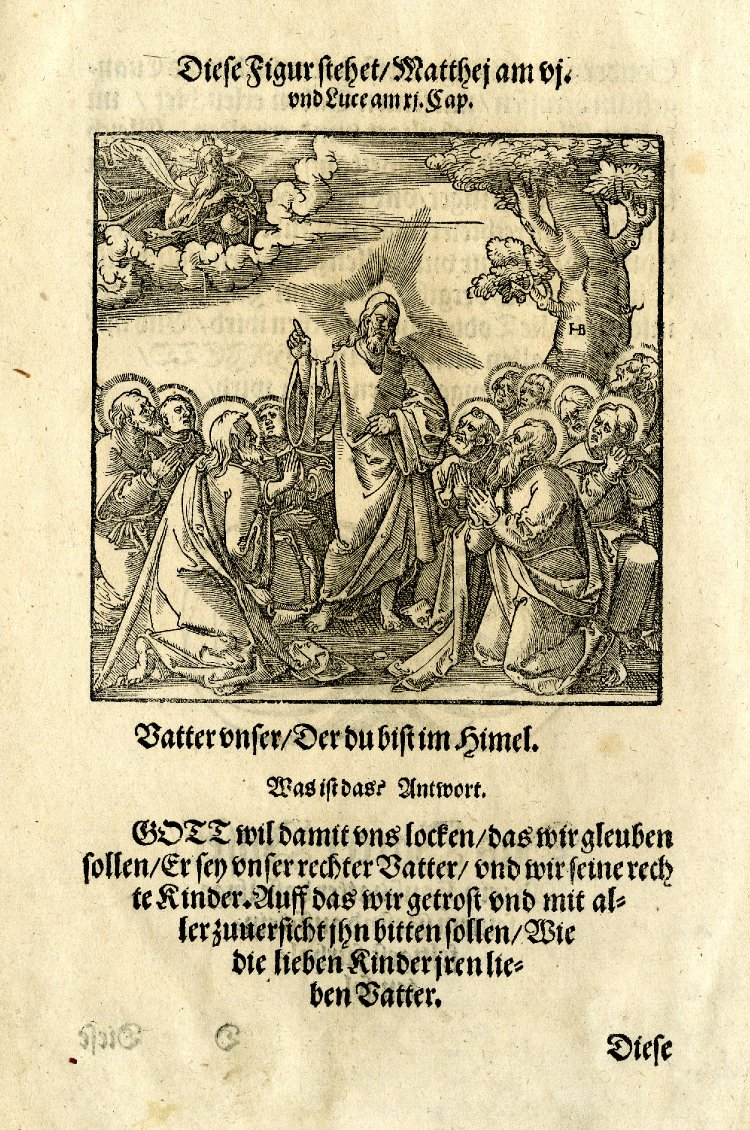
Hans Brosamer, 1550: woodcut in Luther's Small Catechism of Christ teaching His disciples the Lord's Prayer

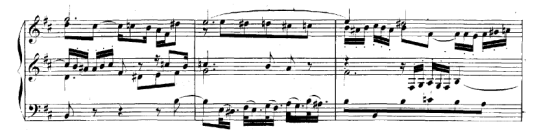

The otherworldly way in which the solo parts weave around the solo lines of the chorale, almost hiding them, has suggested to some commentators "groanings which cannot be uttered"—the mystical nature of prayer. After its first statement the ritornello recurs six times but not as a strict repeat, instead the order in which the different motifs are heard constantly changes.

- BWV 683 Vater unser im Himmelreich (Our Father who art in heaven)

The manualiter chorale prelude BWV 683 in the Dorian mode of D is similar in form to Bach's earlier composition BWV 636 on the same subject from the Orgelbüchlein; the lack of a pedal part allows more freedom and integration of parts in the latter work. The cantus firmus is played without interruption in the uppermost part, accompanied by three-part counterpoint in the lower parts. The accompaniment uses two motifs: the five descending semiquavers in the first bar, derived from the fourth line of the chorale "und willst das beten von uns han" (and wishes us to pray); and the three quaver figure in the alto part in the second half of bar 5. The first motif is also inverted. The quiet and sweetly harmonious nature of the music is evocative of prayer and contemplation. Its intimate scale and orthodox style provide a complete contrast to the previous "larger" setting in BWV 682. At the beginning of each line of the chorale, the musical texture is pared down, with more voices added towards the end of the line: the long very first note of the chorale is unaccompanied. The prelude comes to a subdued conclusion in the lower registers of the keyboard.

==== Baptism BWV 684, 685 ====
- BWV 684 Christ unser Herr zum Jordan kam (Christ our Lord to the Jordan came)

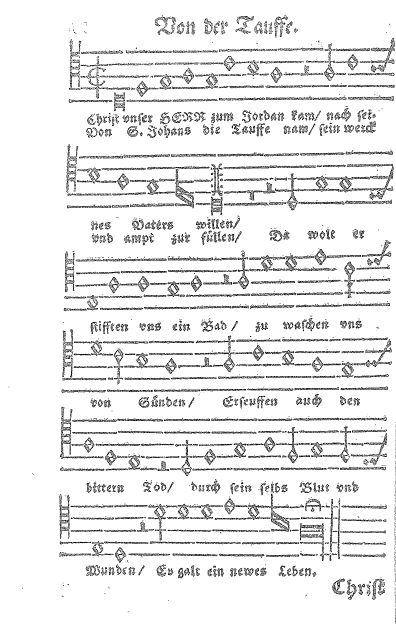
Christ unser Herr zum Jordan kam from a 1577 edition of Luther's hymnbook

Below is the text of the first and last verses of Luther's hymn "Christ unser Herr zum Jordan kam" with the English translation by Charles Sanford Terry:

Christ unser Herr zum Jordan kam
nach seines Vaters Willen,
von Sanct Johann die Taufe nahm,
sein Werk und Amt zu 'rfüllen,
Da wollt er stiften uns ein Bad,
zu waschen uns von Sünden,
ersaüfen auch den bittern Tod
durch sein selbst Blut und Wunden;
es galt ein neues Leben.

Das Aug allein das Wasser sieht,
wie Menschen Wasser gießen;
der Glaub im Geist die Kraft versteht
des Blutes Jesu Christi;
und ist vor ihm ein rote Flut,
von Christi Blut gefärbet,
die allen Schaden heilen tut,
von Adam her geerbet,
auch von uns selbst begangen.

To Jordan when our Lord had gone,
His Father's pleasure willing,
He took His baptism of St John,
His work and task fulfilling;
Therein He would appoint a bath
To wash us from defilement,
And also drown that cruel Death
In His blood of assoilment:
'Twas no less than a new life.

The eye but water doth behold,
As from man's hand it floweth;
But inward faith the power untold
Of Jesus Christ's blood knoweth.
Faith sees therein a red flood roll,
With Christ's blood dyed and blended,
Which hurts of all kinds maketh whole,
From Adam here descended,
And by ourselves brought on us.

When in the arrangement of the chorale "Christ unser Herr zum Jordan kam" an unceasing figure of flowing semiquavers makes itself heard, it needs no skilled critic of Bach's works to find in this an image of the river Jordan. Bach's real meaning, however, will not reveal itself thoroughly to him until he has read the whole poem to the last verse, in which the water of baptism is brought before the believing christian as a symbol of the atoning Blood of Christ

— Philipp Spitta, Johann Sebastian Bach, 1873

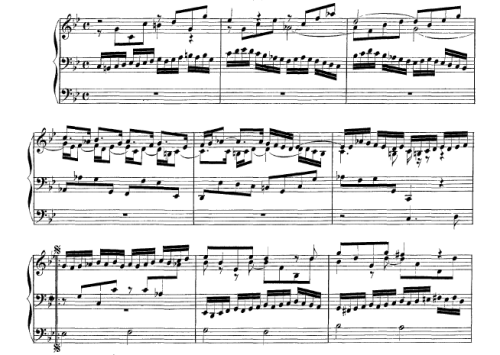

The chorale prelude Christ unser Herr zum Jordan kam BWV 684 has a trio sonata like ritornello in C minor in the three parts of the manuals with the cantus firmus in the tenor register of the pedal in the Dorian mode of C. Bach specifically stipulates two keyboards to give different sonorities to the imitative upper parts and the bass part. The undulating semiquavers in the bass, usually interpreted as representing the flowing waters of the Jordan, imitate a violine continuo, according to the model of Kauffmann's Harmonische Seelenlust. The musical content of the ritornello contains explicit allusions to the melody of the chorale, sometimes hidden in the semiquaver passage work and motifs.

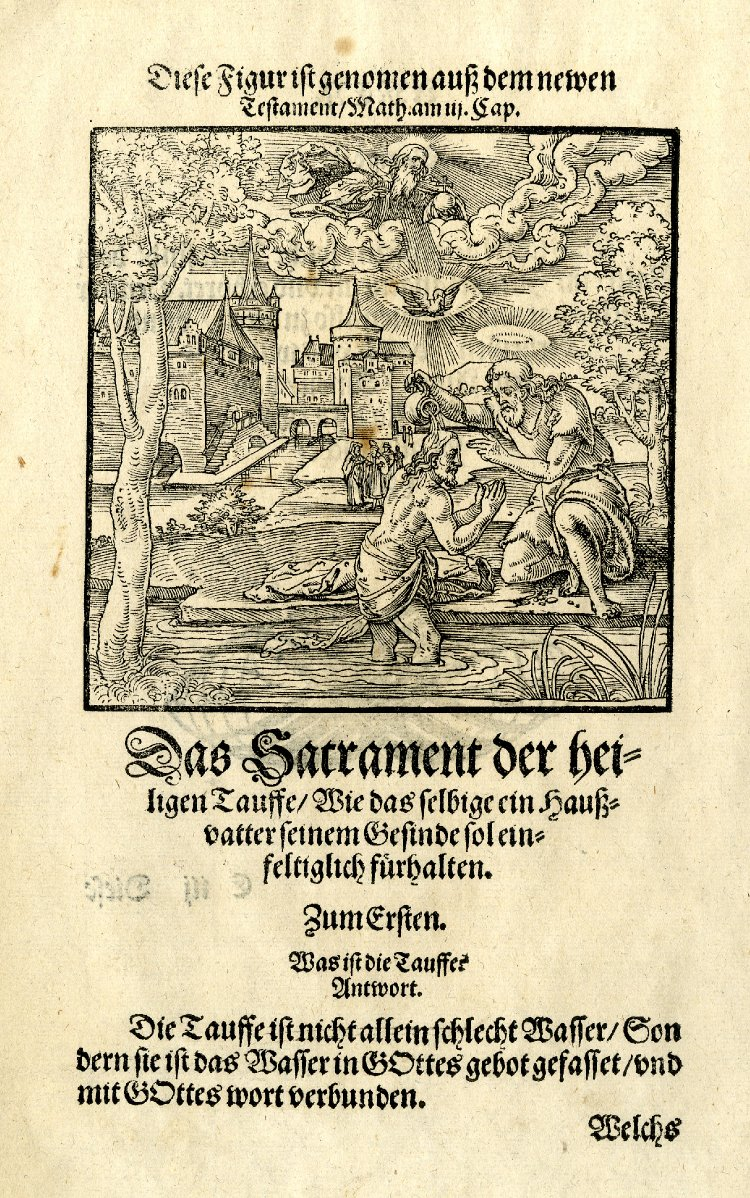
Hans Brosamer, 1550: woodcut in Luther's Small Catechism of the Baptism of Christ

- BWV 685 Christ unser Herr zum Jordan kam (Christ our Lord to the Jordan came)

The chorale prelude on baptism, "Christ unser Herr zum Jordan kam", ... represents running waters ... in the last verse of the chorale, baptism is described as a wave of salvation, stained with the Blood of Christ, which passes over humanity, removing all blemish and sin. The small version of the chorale prelude ... is a curious miniature ... four motifs come forward simultaneously: the first phrase of the melody and its inversion; and the first phrase of the melody in a faster tempo and its inversion ... Is not this the case of a very literal observation? Do we not believe that we see waves rising and falling, with the faster waves tumbling over the slower waves? And is not this musical imagery addressed more to the eye than the ear?

— Albert Schweitzer, J.S. Bach, le musicien-poète, 1905

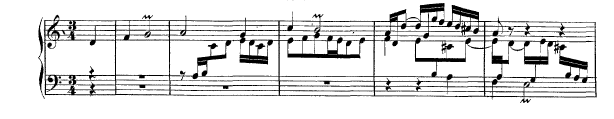

The manualiter chorale prelude BWV 685, despite being only 27 bars long and technically speaking a three-part fughetta, is a complex composition with dense fugal writing. The subject and countersubject are both derived from the first line of the cantus firmus. The compact style, imitative contrapuntal writing and sometimes capricious touches, such as repetition and the ambiguity in the number of parts, are features that BWV 685 shares with the shorter chorale preludes in Kauffmann's Harmonische Seelenlust. The contrary motion between the parts in bar 9 harks back to the compositions of Samuel Scheidt. Williams (2003) has given a precise analysis of the fughetta:

- bars 1–4: subject in soprano, countersubject in alto
- bars 5–7: subject inverted in bass, countersubject inverted in soprano, with a free alto part
- bars 8–10: episode derived from countersubject
- bars 11–14: subject in alto, countersubject in bass, with episode continuing against alto part
- bars 15–17: subject inverted in soprano, countersubject inverted in bass, with derived alto part
- bars 18–20: episode derived from countersubject
- bars 21–23: subject in bass, countersubject in soprano, with derived alto part
- bars 24–27: subject inverted in alto, countersubject inverted in soprano, with derived bass part

There have been many attempts to interpret the musical iconography of BWV 685. Albert Schweitzer suggested that the subject and countersubject gave the visual impression of waves. Hermann Keller suggested that the three entries of the subject and countersubject, and the three inversions, represent the three immersions at baptism. Others have seen allusions to the Trinity in the three voices. The subject and countersubject have been seen as representing Luther's baptismal themes of Old Adam and New Man. Whatever the intended symbolism, Bach's most probable compositional aim was to produce a shorter chorale prelude contrasting musically with the preceding longer setting.

==== Confession BWV 686, 687 ====
- BWV 686 Aus tiefer Not schrei ich zu dir (Out of the depths I cry to Thee)

Below is the text of the first and last verses of Luther's hymn with the English translation by Charles Sanford Terry:

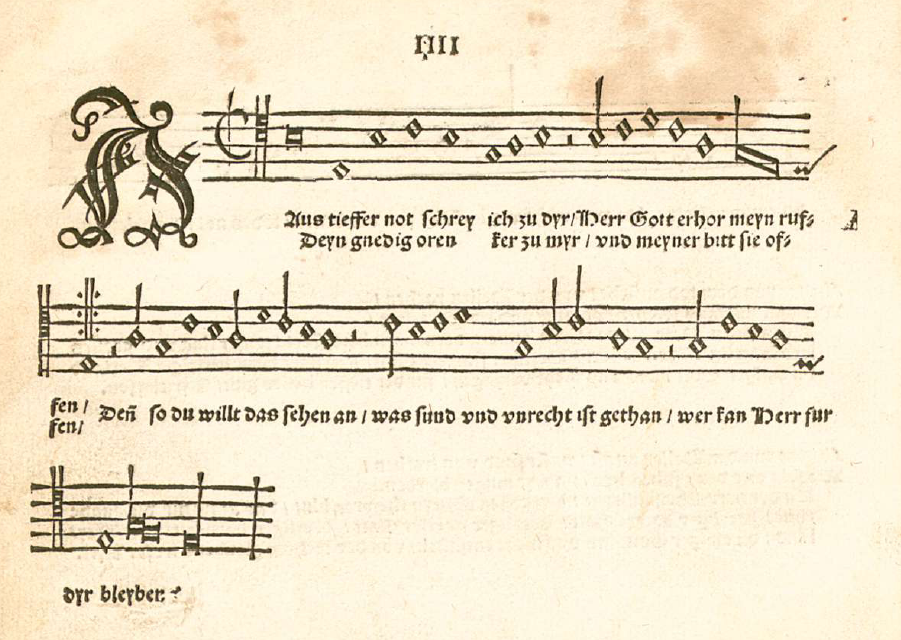
Aus tiefer Not from the 1524 hymnbook of Luther and Walter

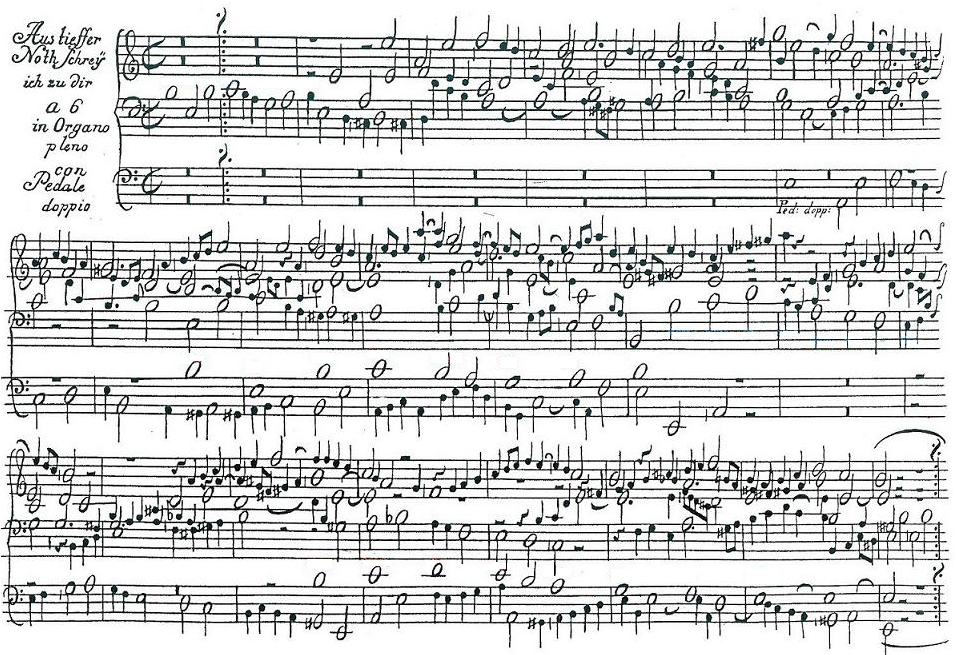
First page of original print of BWV 686

Aus tiefer Not schrei ich zu dir,
Herr Gott, erhör mein Rufen.
Dein gnädig Ohren kehr zu mir
und meiner Bitt sei öffne;
denn so du willst das sehen an,
was Sünd und Unrecht ist getan,
wer kann, Herr, vor dir bleiben?

Darum auf Gott will hoffen ich,
auf mein Verdienst nicht bauen;
auf ihn mein Herz soll lassen sich
und seiner Güte trauen,
die mir zusagt sein wertes Wort;
das ist mein Trost und treuer Hort,
das will ich allzeit harren.

Out of the depths I cry to Thee,
Lord, hear me, I implore Thee!
Bend down Thy gracious ear to me,
Let my prayer come before Thee!
If Thou rememberest each misdeed,
If each should have its rightful meed,
Who may abide Thy presence?

And thus my hope is in the Lord,
And not in mine own merit;
I rest upon His faithful word
To them of contrite spirit;
That He is merciful and just—
Here is my comfort and my trust,
His help I wait with patience.

It is significant of Bach's manner of feeling that he should choose this chorale for the crowning point of his work. For it cannot be questioned that this chorale is its crowning point, from the ingenuity of the part-writing, the wealth and nobility of the harmonies, and the executive power which it requires. Even the Northern masters had never attempted to write two parts for the pedals throughout, though they had first introduced the two-part treatment of the pedals, and Bach did them full justice in this piece.

— Philipp Spitta, Johann Sebastian Bach, 1873

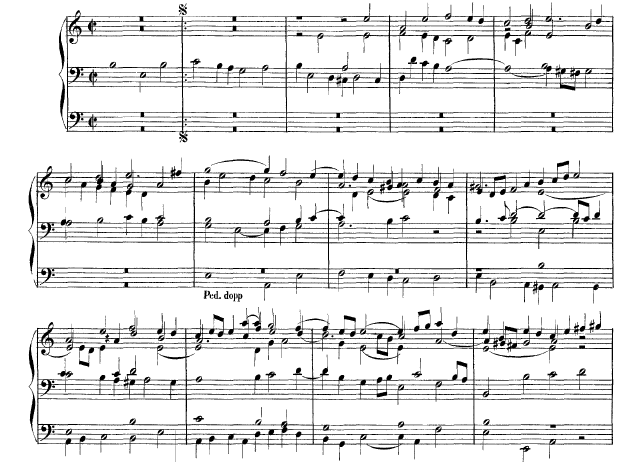

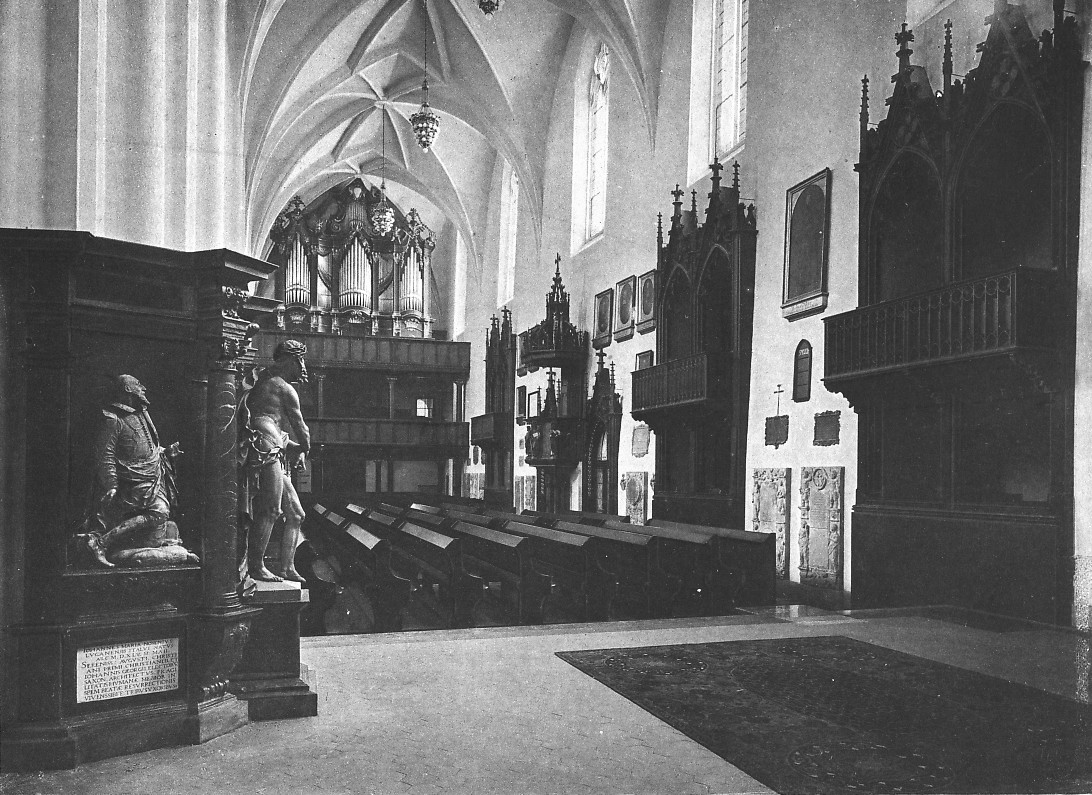
Interior of the Sophienkirche, Dresden, in 1910 showing the 1720 organ of Gottfried Silbermann destroyed by bombing in World War II

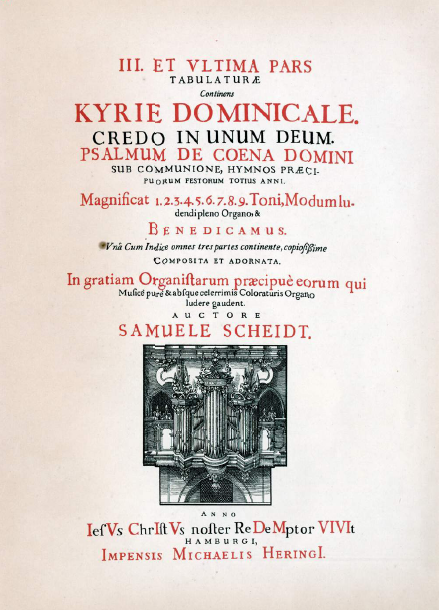
Title page of Part III of Samuel Scheidt's Tabulatura Nova, 1624. The Modum ludendi and Benedicamus had six parts with double pedal

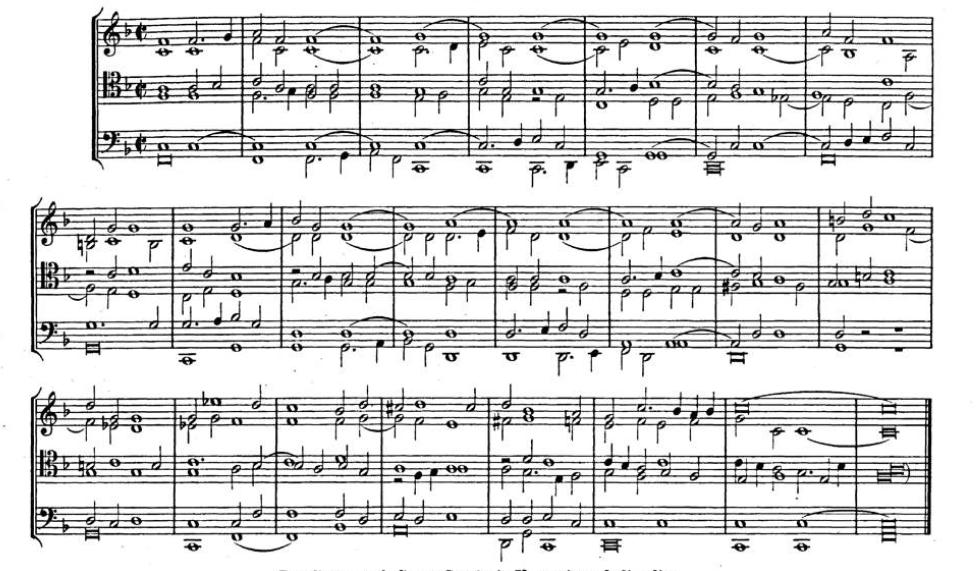
Scheidt's Modus Pleno Organo Pedaliter: Benedicamus, 1624

The chorale prelude Aus tiefer Not schrei ich zu dir BWV 686 is a monumental chorale motet in the phrygian mode of C. The climax of Clavier-Übung III, it is composed in the strict polyphonic stile antico of Palestrina using florid counterpoint. This is Bach's unique six-part composition for organ, if the Ricercar a 6 from the Musical Offering BWV 1079 is discounted. German organ writing for double pedal (doppio pedale) can be traced back to Arnolt Schlick and Ludwig Senfl in the 16th century; to Samuel Scheidt in two settings from his Tabulatura Nova in the early 17th century; and in the baroque period to Buxtehude, Reincken, Bruhns, Tunder, Weckmann and Lübeck. In France, among the composers to have written double pedal parts were François Couperin, in his organ Mass des paroisses, and Louis Marchand.

The first verse of Luther's hymn had already been set by Bach in the cantata Aus tiefer Not schrei ich zu dir, BWV 38 (1724). The fact that the setting in BWV 686 flows more easily, has more countersubjects, has more novel features and has typically organ figurations in the final section has suggested that in this case the whole of Luther's text was taken into account and that it is a purer version of the stile antico. Following the huge scale of the opening, Bach highly inventively incorporates motifs from the cantus firmus into the countersubjects of the seven sections (counting the repeat), resulting in a constantly changing musical texture. The widest range in pitch between upper and lower parts occurs exactly halfway through at bar 27. At the end of each line the cantus firmus is taken up in the left (lower) pedal, which, without break, then plays the countersubject while above the right (upper) pedal concludes the section by playing the cantus firmus in the tenor register in augmentation (i.e., with doubled note lengths). The proliferation of dactyl "joy" motifs (a crotchet followed by two quavers) in the last section of the prelude reflects the optimism in the last verse.

Williams (2003) has given the following analysis of the seven sections:

- first and third line: fugal section, with stretti in tenor and soprano manual voices at b.3 and in bass and soprano manual parts in b.9; countersubject with syncopation and crotchet figures
- second and fourth line: the rising three-note phrase or caput at the start of the melody occurs in minims or crotchets in all parts, all of which move stepwise (up or down to the nearest note); previous crotchet countersubject inverted
- fifth line: all parts except the manual bass have the melody; the syncopated countersubject involves either jumps, four-quaver figures or anapaests (two quavers followed by a crotchet)
- sixth line: melody only in alto and tenor manual and tenor and bass pedal parts; jumps in the countersubject break up the musical texture
- seventh line: melody in all parts in slightly modified form and with some inversion; animated dactyl and quaver figures in countersubject, adding more lively modern elements to the severe stile antico
- BWV 687 Aus tiefer Noth schrei' ich zu dir (Out of the depths I cry to Thee)

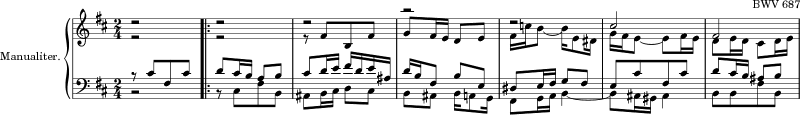

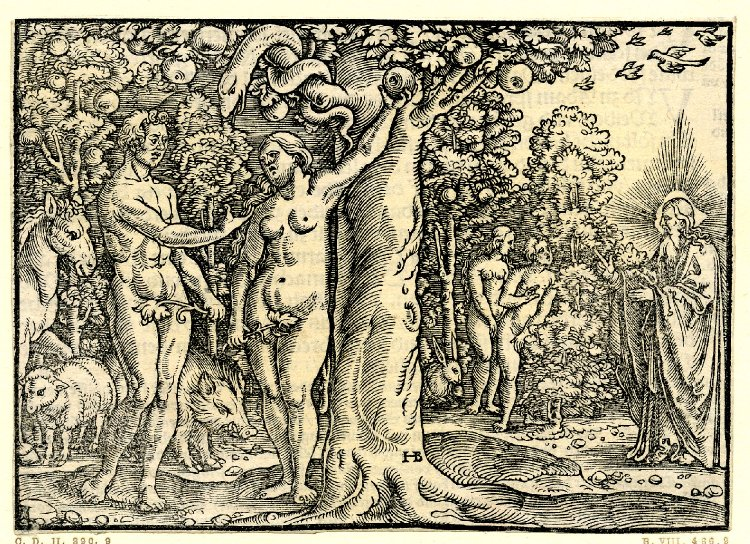
Hans Brosamer, 1550: woodcut of the Fall of Man in Luther's Bible

This smaller manualiter setting of Aus tiefer Noth schrei' ich zu dir is a four-part chorale motet in the key of F♯ minor, with the augmented cantus firmus in the phrygian mode of E in the uppermost soprano part. The strict contrapuntal writing is denser than that of BWV 686, although it adheres less to the stile antico and has a more uniform texture. Commentators have suggested that the continual responses to the fugue subjects by their inversion signify confession followed by forgiveness. Williams (2003) has pointed out the following musical features in the seven sections of BWV 687:

- in each section, the fugue subject in quavers is derived from elements of the corresponding cantus firmus; it is answered by inversions of the subject in stretto
- in each section, there are five bars with alto, tenor and bass in counterpoint, followed by eight bars of the soprano cantus firmus in minims and ending with a one bar cadence
- as each cantus firmus episode progresses, the accompanying lower parts move in a more animated way

==== Communion BWV 688, 689 ====
- BWV 688 Jesus Christus, unser Heiland (Jesus Christ our Saviour)

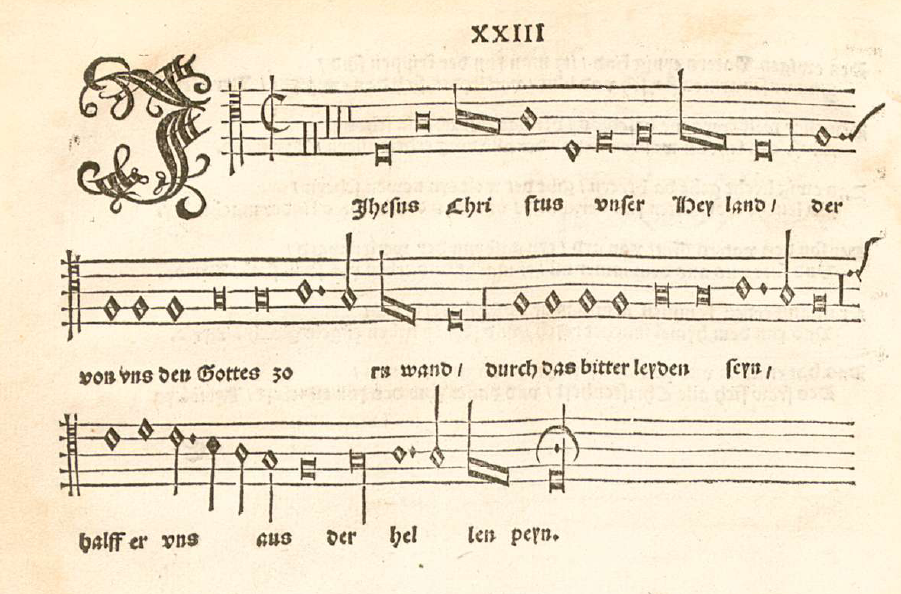
Jesus Christus, unser Heiland from the 1524 hymnbook of Luther and Walter

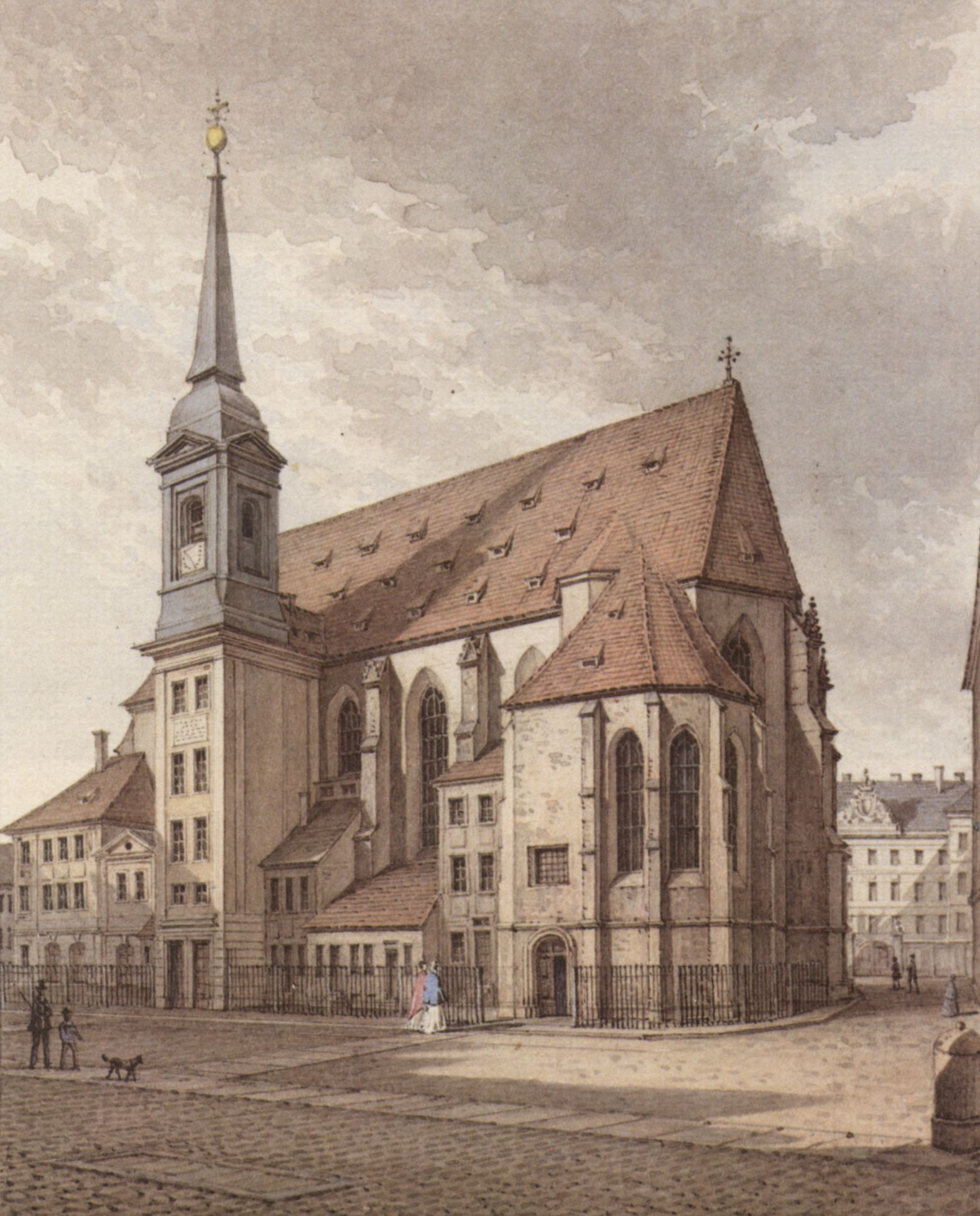
Christian Gottlob Hammer, 1852: The Sophienkirche in Dresden where Bach's son Wilhelm Friedemann was appointed organist in 1733

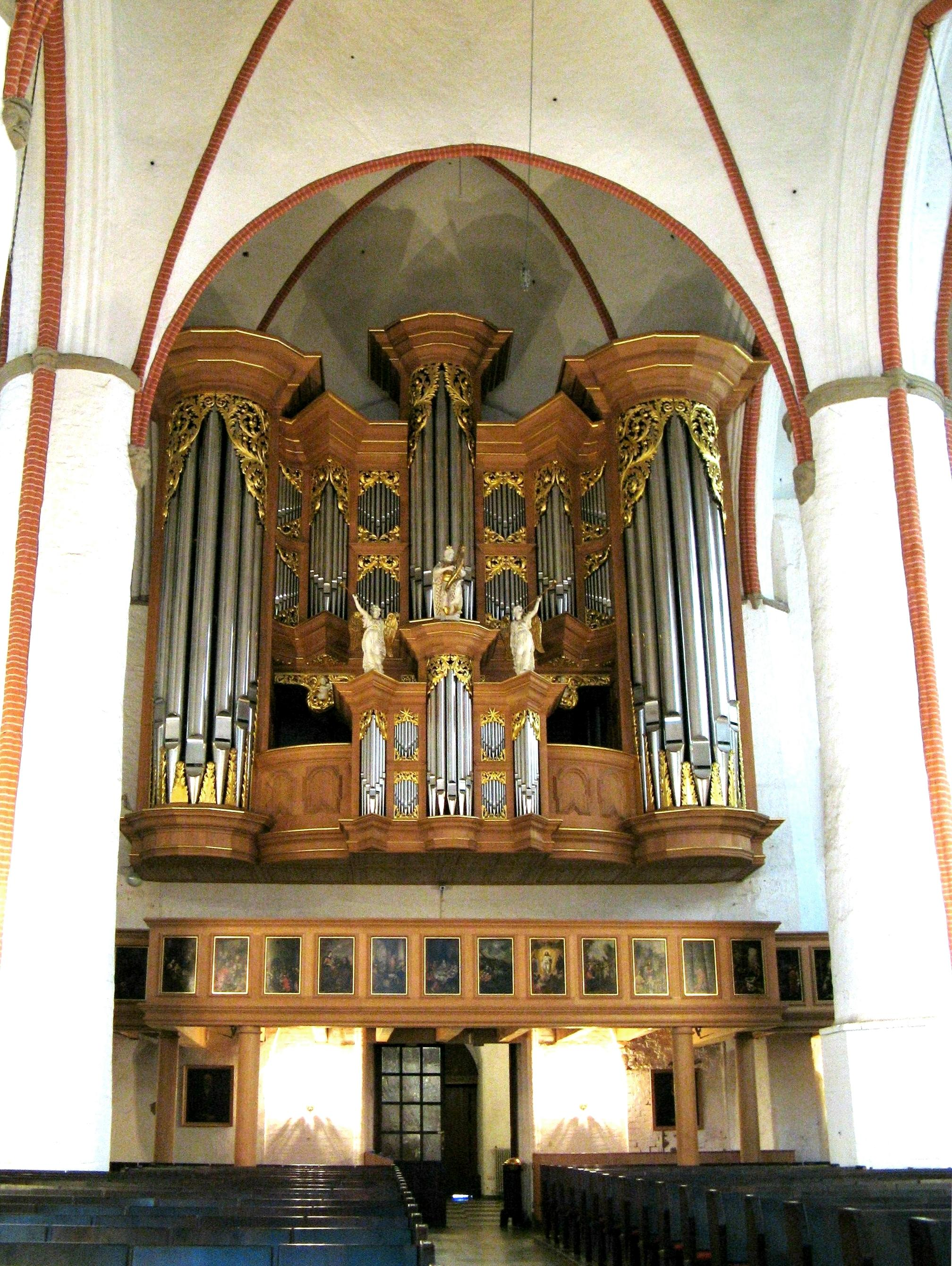
Arp Schnitger organ constructed in 1693 in the Jacobikirche, Hamburg, one of the organs Bach played in 1720

Below is the full text of Luther's hymn with the English translation by Charles Sanford Terry:

Jesus Christus, unser Heiland,
der von uns den Gottes Zorn wandt,
durch das bitter Leiden sein
half er aus uns der Höllen Pein.

Daß wir nimmer des vergessen,
Gab er uns sein Leib zu essen,
Verborgen im Brot so klein,
Und zu trinken sein Blut im Wein.

Wer sich will zu dem Tische machen,
Der hab wohl acht auf sein Sachen;
Wer unwürdig hiezu geht,
Für das Leben den Tod empfäht.

Du sollst Gott den Vater preisen,
Daß er dich so wohl wollt speisen,
Und für deine Missetat
In den Tod sein Sohn geben hat.

Du sollst glauben und nicht wanken,
Daß ein Speise sei den Kranken,
Den ihr Herz von Sünden schwer,
Und vor Angst betrübet, sehr.

Solch groß Gnad und Barmherzigkeit
Sucht ein Herz in großer Arbeit;
Ist dir wohl, so bleib davon,
Daß du nicht kriegest bösen Lohn.

Er spricht selber:Kommt, ihr Armen,
Laßt mich über euch erbarmen;
Kein Arzt ist dem Starken not,
Sein Kunst wird an ihm gar ein Spott.

Hättst dir war kunnt erwerben,
Was durft denn ich für dich sterben?
Dieser Tisch auch dir nicht gilt,
So du selber dir helfen willst.

Glaubst du das von Herzensgrunde
Und bekennest mit dem Mund,
So bist du recht wohl geschickt
Und die Speise dein Seel erquickt.

Die Frucht soll auch nicht ausbleiben:
Deinen Nächsten sollst du lieben,
Daß er dein genießen kann,
Wie dein Gott an dir getan.

Christ Jesus, our Redeemer born,
Who from us did God's anger turn,
Through His sufferings sore and main,
Did help us all out of hell-pain.

That we never should forget it,
Gave He us His flesh, to eat it,
Hid in poor bread, gift divine,
And, to drink, His blood in the wine.

Who will draw near to that table
Must take heed, all he is able.
Who unworthy thither goes,
Thence death instead of life he knows.

God the Father praise thou duly,
That He thee would feed so truly,
And for ill deeds by thee done
Up unto death has given His Son.

Have this faith, and do not waver,
'Tis a food for every craver
Who, his heart with sin opprest,
Can no more for its anguish rest.

Such kindness and such grace to get,
Seeks a heart with agony great.
Is it well with thee? take care,
Lest at last thou shouldst evil fare.

He doth say, Come hither, O ye
Poor, that I may pity show ye.
No physician th' whole man will,
He makes a mockery of his skill.

Hadst thou any claim to proffer,
Why for thee then should I suffer?
This table is not for thee,
If thou wilt set thine own self free.

If such faith thy heart possesses,
And the same thy mouth confesses,
Fit guest then thou art indeed,
And so the food thy soul will feed.

But bear fruit, or lose thy labour:
Take thou heed thou love thy neighbour;
That thou food to him mayst be,
As thy God makes Himself to thee.

These grand pieces are at the same time eloquent witnesses to his depth of nature, both as a poet and as a composer. Bach always deduced the emotional character of his organ chorales from the whole hymn, and not from its first verse alone. In this way he generally obtained from the poem some leading thought, which seemed to him of particular importance, and in accordance with which he gave to the composition a poetic and musical character of its own. We must follow out his method in detail in order to have been sure that we have grasped his meaning. In the hymn for the Holy Communion, "Jesus Christus unser Heiland," the counterpoint, with its broad, ponderous progressions, may, to the superficial observer, seem unsuitable to the character of the hymn. The attentive reader of the words will, however, soon find the passage that gave rise to this characteristic musical phrase ... the fifth verse. Faith, lively and immovable, together with the solemnity of a consciousness of sin, are the two elements which constitute the emotional groundwork of the piece.

— Philipp Spitta, Johann Sebastian Bach, 1873

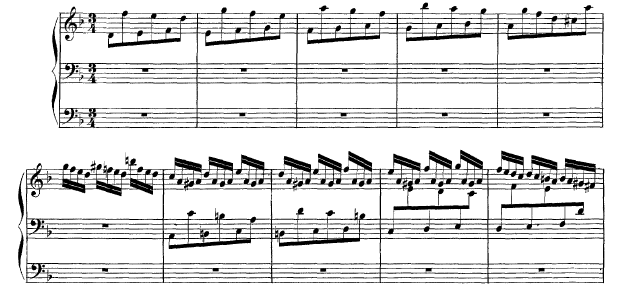

The chorale prelude Jesus Christus, unser Heiland BWV 688 is a trio sonata with the upper voices in quavers and semiquavers the manuals and the cantus firmus in minims in the pedal in the Dorian mode of G, like a Gregorian chant. The eccentric angularity of the keyboard subject with its great widening or narrowing leaps is derived from the melody. It has prompted much speculation as to its iconographic significance. "Unwavering faith" has been taken to be the underlying theme by many commentators, including Spitta and Schweitzer, who compared the unsteady theme to the vision of a sailor seeking a firm foothold on a stormy deck (un marin qui cherche un appui solide sur une planche roulante). Others have interpreted the leaping theme as representing Man's parting from and return to God; or as the "great agony" (großer Arbeit) of the sixth verse; or as the anger of God appeased by the suffering of Christ (the theme followed by its inversion); or as a reference to the treading of the winepress in the passage

"Wherefore art thou red in thine apparel, and thy garments like him that treadeth in the winefat? I have trodden the winepress alone; and of the people there was none with me: for I will tread them in mine anger, and trample them in my fury; and their blood shall be sprinkled upon my garments, and I will stain all my raiment."

from Isaiah 63:2–3, signifying victory over the Cross. It has similarly been suggested that the semiquaver passages are a reference to the flowing wine-blood of the communion. Visually, the quaver theme might contain a cross motif and might form an elongated Christogram on the Greek letters iota and chi in certain sections of the score.

Whatever the religious significance, the musical development from the motifs is ingenious and subtle, constantly varying. The material in the semiquaver codetta (bar 6) of the fugue subject and of the countersubject (bars 7–9) is used and developed extensively throughout BWV 688, sometimes in inverted form. The theme itself is transformed in all sorts of ways, including inversion, reflection, reversal and syncopation, the variety increased by how the two upper voices combine. Once started, the semiquaver figures form a moto perpetuo. At some points, they contain hidden versions of the quaver fugue subject; but as the work progresses, they gradually simplify to scale passages. Even the ending is unconventional, with a simulated ritardando in the last bars with the pedal silent. The chorale prelude is thus composed from a few organic motifs heard already in the first few bars. The unprecedented novelty and musical originality of such a self-generated composition might have been Bach's main intention.

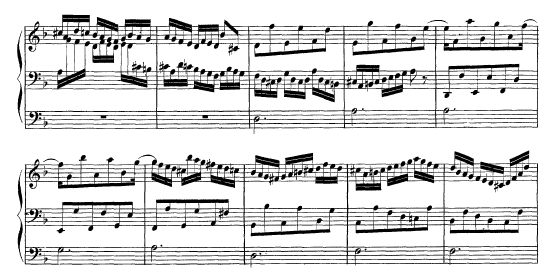

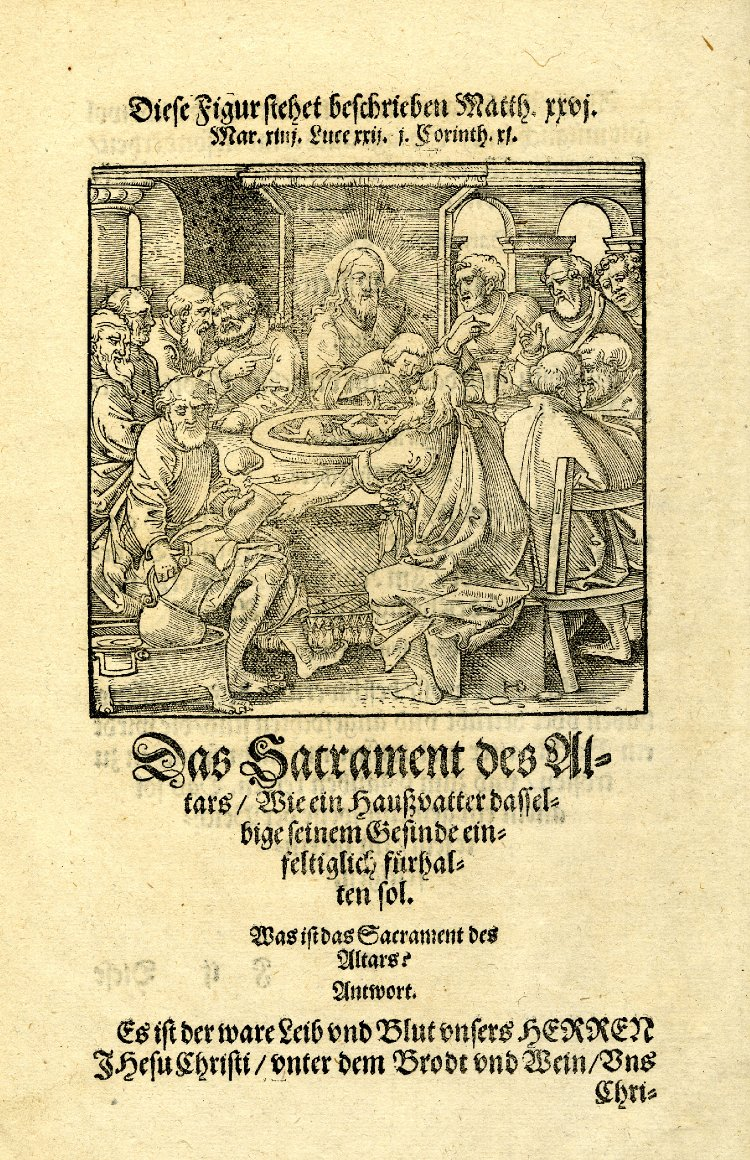
Hans Brosamer, 1550: woodcut in Luther's Small Catechism of the Last Supper

- BWV 689 Jesus Christus, unser Heiland (Jesus Christ our Saviour)

Improvising fugues was part of the organist's stock in trade ... The present fugue is an almost unimaginably transfigured version of this genre, which Bach also resuscitated and handled less radically elsewhere in the Clavierübung. It must also be one of the most dramatic, in the sense of eventful, fugues Bach ever wrote. The drama begins in a mood of sobriety and pain and ends in transcendence.

— Joseph Kerman, The Art of Fugue: Bach Fugues for Keyboard, 1715–1750

The last manualiter four-part chorale prelude, Jesus Christus, unser Heiland BWV 689 in C minor, is marked "Fuga super Jesus Christus, unser Heyland" in the 1739 print. In contrast to the previous fughettas in the previous five manualiter settings of the catechism hymns, it is a long and complex fugue of great originality, a tour de force in the use of stretti. The fugue subject is derived from the first line of the chorale. In order to facilitate the stretti which underlie the whole conception of BWV 689, Bach chose to transform the modal melody by sharpening the fourth note from a B♭ to a B♮, a modification already found in 17th-century hymnbooks. This change also allowed Bach to introduce dissonances, imbuing the work with what the French organist and musicologist Norbert Dufourcq called "tormented chromaticism". The quaver countersubject and its inversions are used and developed throughout the fugue. It resembles some of Bach's other keyboard fugues, in particular the antepenultimate fugue in B♭ minor BWV 891/2 of the second book of The Well-Tempered Clavier, composed at roughly the same time.

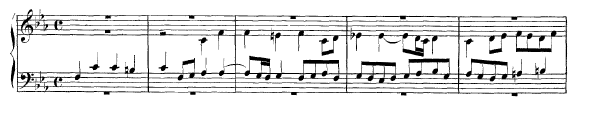

The inversion of the countersubject in bar 5, omitting the first note, plays a significant role later in the fugue (bar 30):

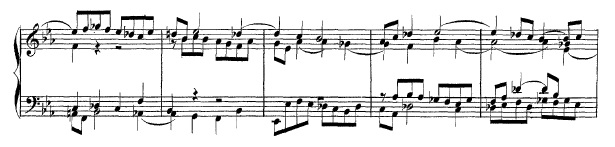

The stretti occur at intervals of varying length; in addition to the fugue subject, there are also imitations and stretti both for the semiquaver figure in the subject (and its inversions) and the figure above derived from the countersubject. Williams (2003) has given the following summary of the stretti for the fugue subject:

- bars 1–2: between tenor and alto, one and a half bars later
- bars 7–8: between soprano and bass, one and a half bars later
- bar 10: between alto and soprano, 1 crotchet later
- bar 16: between alto and tenor, a minim later
- bars 23–24: between bass and tenor, a bar later
- bars 36–37: between alto and soprano, 5 crotchets later
- bars 37–38: between soprano and tenor, one and a half bars later
- bar 57: subject simultaneously in crotchets in alto and augmented in minims in tenor

The last entry of the fugue subject in the tenor voice gives the impression of the return of a conventional cantus firmus; the coda over the tenor's sustained F is built on the motifs of the countersubject. The different types of stretti result in a large variety of harmonisations of the theme and musical textures throughout the chorale prelude.

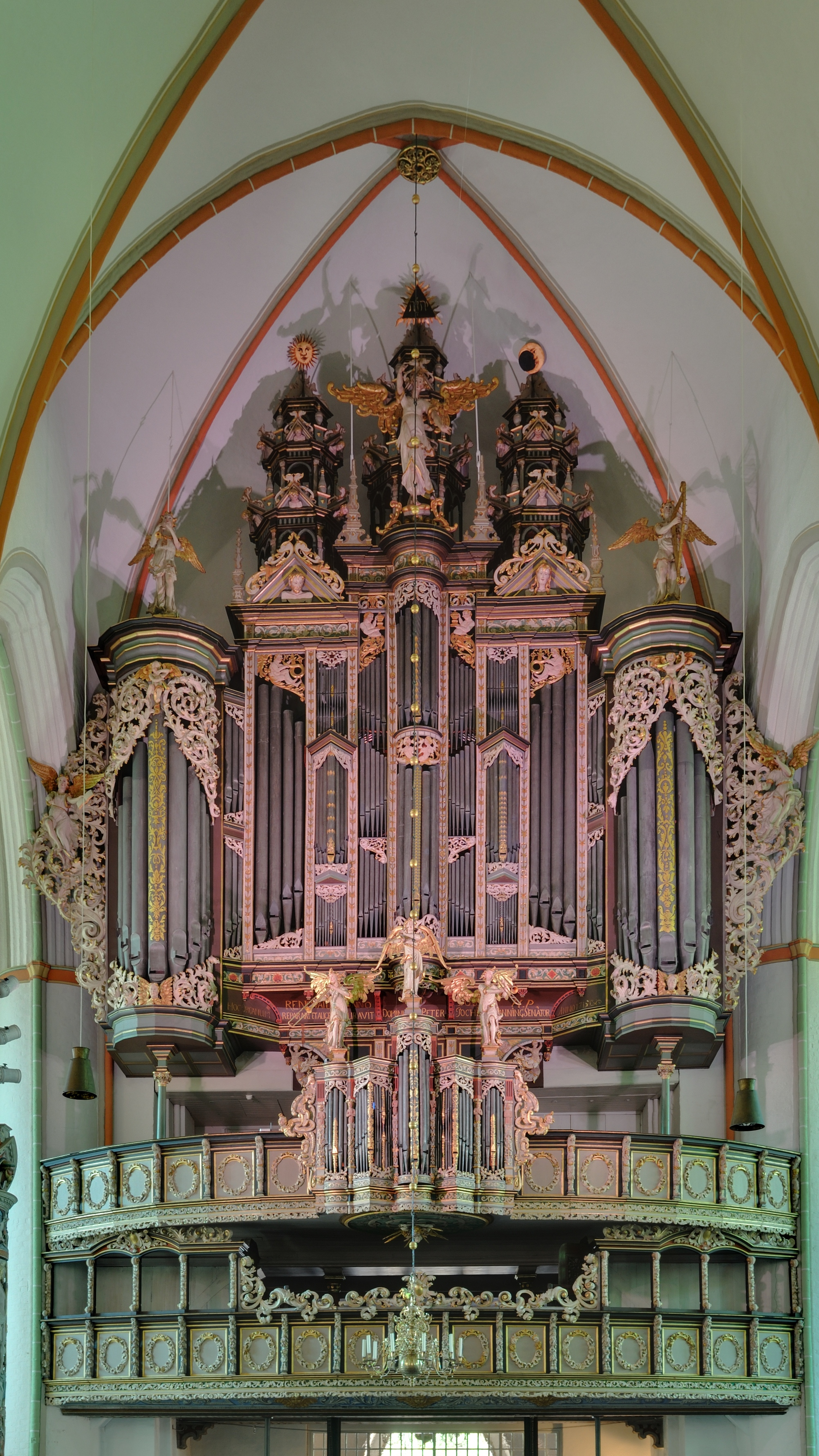
Organ in the Johanniskirche, Lüneburg, where Bach heard Georg Böhm play

Kerman (2008) has given a detailed analysis of BWV 689 from the perspective of Bach's keyboard fugues:

- Section 1 (bars 1–18). The fugue starts in a measured way, as if under a burden, the four entries effectively spaced out over regular units of 1 1/2 bars. The tenor is followed in stretto 6 beats later by the alto and then similarly the soprano by the bass. Before the bass subject ends on the first beat of bar 11, a second set of fugal entries begins, this time more anguished, more dissonant, due to the irregularity of the stretti. The alto entry at the beginning of bar 10 is followed a beat later by the soprano; and the tenor entry at the beginning of bar 16 is followed two beats later by the bass. The quaver countersubject and its inversion are heard throughout, as an unobtrusive accompaniment, yet to reveal their true character.
- Section 2 (bars 19–35). The C minor cadence in the middle of bar 19 would normally signify a new subject in a fugue. In this case, a leap upwards of a fourth in the soprano part, taken from the fugue subject, and then imitated in the tenor and bass parts, signals a renewed vitality and heralds the transformation of the countersubject into material derived from the fourth line of the chorale melody, comprising its highest notes and therefore easily recognizable. The new second 8-quaver subject is heard first in the soprano voice in the second half of bar 20 and the first half of bar 21: it is answered twice by its inversion in the bass in sequence. Then in bars 23–27, the soprano plays the second subject twice in sequence followed by the inverted form in the alto. Below the bass and tenor play the first subject with a stretto of one bar: for the only time in the fugue, however, these entries of the first subject are not prominent, but play a background role. After the second subject is heard a third time in the soprano, the music seems to draw to a close in the middle of a bar over a 2.5-bar-long pedal C in the bass. However, as the tenor takes up the second subject, the music surges up in semiquaver motifs in the soprano and alto parts to reach a climax at bar 30, when, in a moment of high pathos, the second subject is heard high in the soprano. But then in the succeeding bar, the music transforms into a peaceful and harmonious mood of consolation, with the major tonality heard for the first time. In a long and beautiful passage, the now-tranquil second subject descends in successive bars through the alto and bass parts, passing into the tenor part to reach the second main cadence of the fugue, after which it is heard no more until the last section.
- Section 3 (bars 36–56). At the cadence the fugue moves back into B♭ minor. The musical texture becomes restless and eccentric; chromaticism returns and the rhythms, enlivened by semiquavers, become unsettling for the listener. The alto resumes the fugue subject followed by a stretto entry of the soprano in its higher register five beats later. The bass then takes up a dance-like accompaniment in 3/4 time, just before a stretto entry from the tenor. The bass continues for 6 bars of 3/4 time (i.e. 4 1/2 normal bars) introducing a short new motif involving a downwards drop of a fifth, linked to the fugue subject and already hinted at in the first section. The soprano plays the new motif in canon with the bass, until the bass resumes the subject, starting on the second beat of the bar, and the rhythm stabilises. The upper parts play a combination of the countersubject and the new motif and continue with them as an episode after the fugue subject ends. A further subject entry in the bass is followed by another episode based on the new motif as all the parts descend with chromaticisms to a cadence.
- Section 4 (bars 57–67). In the final section Bach is at his most inventive, creating what Kerman calls "sublime clockwork". The tenor part plays the fugue subject in augmentation like a cantus firmus in minims until the final pedal point F held for five bars. At the same time Bach adds one statement of the fugue subject in crotchets in the alto part, as a sort of "simultaneous stretto". Over this in the soprano he superimposes the second subject in quavers, that has not been heard since the end of the second section. There is a resumption of the clarity and harmoniousness last heard there as the alto and bass parts join the soprano polyphonically in the countersubject, continuing to the close over the pedal point.

== Four duets BWV 802–805 ==
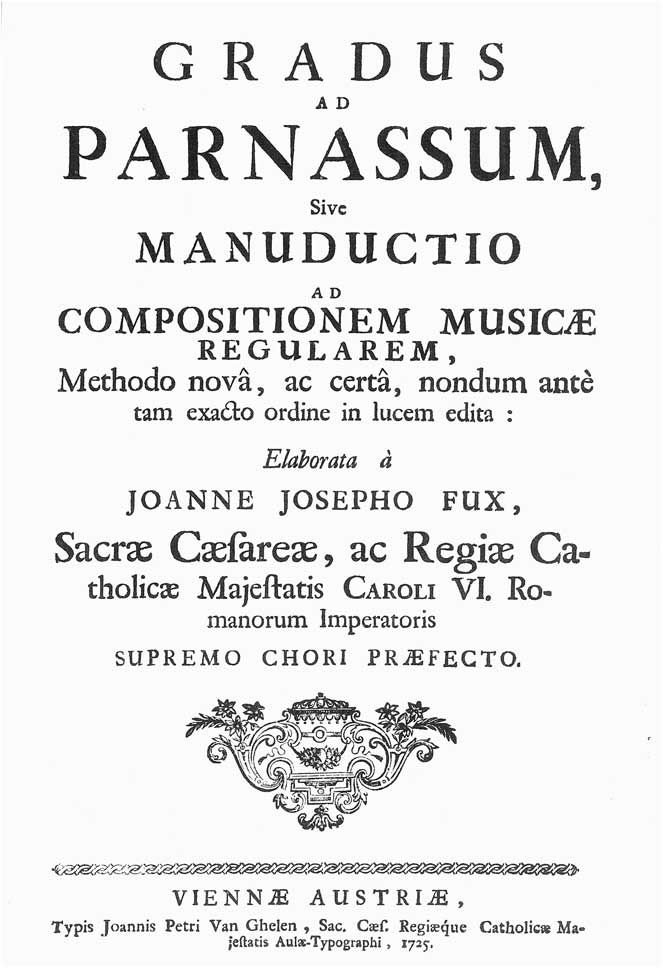
Gradus ad Parnassum, the 1725 treatise on counterpoint by Johann Fux, Austrian composer and music theorist

The descriptions of the duets are based on the detailed analysis in Williams (2003) and Charru & Theobald (2002).
To listen to a MIDI recording, please click on the link.

The four duetti BWV 802–805, in the successive tonalities of E minor, F major, G major and A minor, were included at a fairly late stage in 1739 in the engraved plates for Clavier-Übung III. Their purpose has remained a source of debate. Like the beginning prelude and fugue BWV 552 they are not explicitly mentioned on the title page and there is no explicit indication that they were intended for organ. However, as several commentators have noted, at a time when Bach was busy composing counterpoint for the second book of The Well-Tempered Clavier and the Goldberg Variations (Clavier-Übung IV) using a very wide harpsichord range, Bach wrote the duets to lie comfortably in the range C to c″″′ in Helmholtz pitch notation (C2 to C6 in scientific pitch notation), so within the relatively narrow compass of almost every organ of the time. The pieces can nevertheless be played on any single keyboard, such as a harpsichord or fortepiano.

The use of the term duetto itself is closest to that given in the first volume of the Critica Musica (1722) of Johann Mattheson: a piece for two voices involving more than just "imitation at the unison and the octave". It was Mattheson's view that "a composer's true masterpiece" could rather be found in "an artful, fugued duet, more than a many-voiced alla breve or counterpoint". In choosing the form of the compositions, which go considerably beyond his Two part inventions BWV 772–786, Bach might have been making a musical contribution to the contemporary debates on the theory of counterpoint, already propounded in the tracts of Friedrich Wilhelm Marpurg and of Johann Fux, whose Gradus ad Parnassum had been translated by Bach's friend Mizler. Yearsley (2002) has suggested that it may have been a direct response to the ongoing argument on musical style between Birnbaum and Scheibe: Bach combines the simple and harmonious styles advocated by his critics Mattheson and Scheibe with a more modern chromatic and often dissonant style, which they regarded as "unnatural" and "artificial". Despite many proposed explanations—for example as accompaniments to communion, with the two parts possibly signifying the two sacramental elements of bread and wine—it has never been determined whether Bach attached any religious significance to the four duets; instead it has been considered more likely that Bach sought to illustrate the possibilities of two-part counterpoint as fully as possible, both as a historical account and "for the greater glory of God".

=== Duetto I BWV 802 ===
The first duet in E minor is a double fugue, 73 bars long, in which all the musical material is invertible, i.e. can be exchanged between the two parts. The first subject is six bars long broken up into one bar segments. It is made up of one bar of demisemiquaver scales leading into four bars where the theme becomes angular, chromatic and syncopated. In the sixth bar a demisemiquaver motif is introduced that is developed later in the duet in a highly original way; it also serves as a means of modulation after which the parts interchange their roles. The contrasting second subject in quavers with octave leaps is a descent by a chromatic fourth. The harmonies between the two chromatic parts are similar to those in the A minor prelude BWV 889/1 from the second book of The Well-Tempered Clavier, presumed to have been composed at roughly the same time.

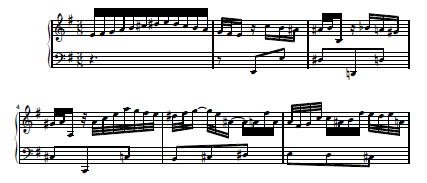

BWV 802 has been analysed as follows:

- bars 1–28: exposition for 6 bars in E minor followed by 6 bars with parts interchanged in B minor, four transitional bars of the demisemiquaver motif in imitation, followed by a repeat of the exposition for 12 bars, all in E minor
- bars 29–56: inverted exposition for 6 bars with parts in G major followed by 6 bars with parts interchanged in D major, four transitional bars of the demisemiquaver motif in imitation, followed by a repeat of the inverted exposition for 12 bars, all in B minor
- bars 57–60: a transitional passage made up of demisemiquaver scales for 2 bars in D minor, then inverted for 2 bars in A minor
- bars 61–73: repeat of exposition for 5 bars then with parts interchanged for 5 bars, followed by a final interchange and inversion of parts for the 3 bar coda, all in E minor

=== Duetto II BWV 803 ===
The A section of the F major Duetto is everything that Scheibe could have asked for—and that is not enough for Bach, who moves here far beyond the clarity and unity of the F major invention. Without the B section the Duetto is the perfect work of 1739, completely in and of its time. In its entirety however the piece is a perfect blasphemy—a powerful refutation indeed of the progressive shibboleths of naturalness and transparency.

— David Yearsley, Bach and the meanings of counterpoint

The second duet in F major BWV 803 is a fugue written in the form of a da capo aria, in the form ABA. The first section has 37 bars and the second 75 bars, so that with repeats there are 149 bars. There is a sharp contrast between the two sections, which Yearsley (2002) has suggested might have been Bach's musical response to the acrimonious debate on style being conducted between Scheibe and Birnbaum at the time of composition. Section A is a conventional fugue in the spirit of the Inventions and Sinfonias, melodious, harmonious and undemanding on the listener—the "natural" cantabile approach to composition advocated by both Mattheson and Scheibe.

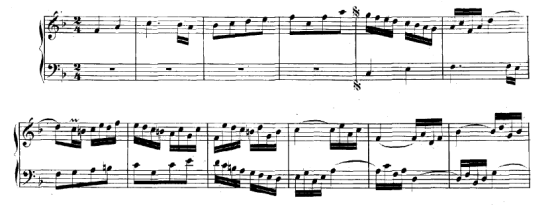

Section B is written in quite a different way. It is severe and chromatic, mostly in minor keys, with dissonances, strettos, syncopation and canonic writing—all features frowned upon as "artificial" and "unnatural" by Bach's critics. Section B is divided symmetrically into segments of 31, 13 and 31 bars. The first subject of section A is heard again in canon in the minor key.

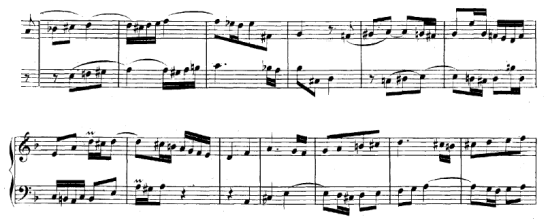

The character of the first subject undergoes a complete transformation, from bright and effortless simplicity to dark and strained complexity: the strettos in the first subject produce unusual augmented triads; and a new chromatic countersubject emerges in the central 13-bar segment (which begins in bar 69, the fifth bar below).

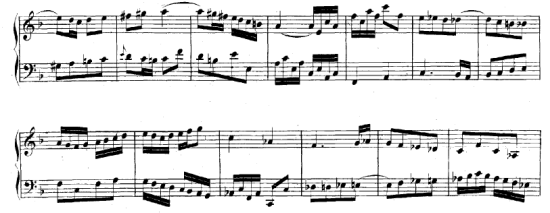

The musical structure of Section A is as follows:

- bars 1–4: (first) subject in right hand, F major
- bars 5–8: subject in left hand, semiquaver countersubject in right hand, C major
- bars 9–16: episode on material from countersubject
- bars 17–20: subject in right hand, countersubject in left hand, C major
- bars 21–28: episode on material from countersubject
- bars 29–32: subject in left hand, F major
- bars 33–37: coda

The musical structure of Section B is as follows:

- bars 38–45: second subject (in two 4 bar segments) in canon at the fifth, led by right hand
- bars 46–52: first subject in canon at the fifth, led by the right hand, D minor
- bars 53–60: second subject in canon at the fifth, led by left hand
- bars 61–68: first subject in canon at the fifth, led by left hand, A minor
- bars 69–81: first subject in left hand with chromatic countersubject in right hand (5 bars), inverted first subject in right hand with inverted chromatic countersubject in rleft hand (5 bars), semiquaver passagework (3 bars)
- bars 82–89: second subject, in canon at the fifth, led by left hand
- bars 90–96: first subject in canon at the fifth, led by left hand, F minor
- bars 97–104: second subject in canon at the fifth, led by right hand
- bars 105–112: first subject in canon at the fifth, led by right hand, C minor

=== Duetto III BWV 804 ===
The third duet BWV 804 in G major, 39 bars long, is the simplest of the four duetti. Light and dance-like, it is the closest in form to Bach's Two Part Inventions, of which it most closely resembles the last, No.15 BWV 786. The bass accompaniment in detached quavers of the subject does not appear in the upper part and is not developed.

With very little modulation or chromaticism, the novelty of BWV 804 lies in the development of the semiquaver passagework.

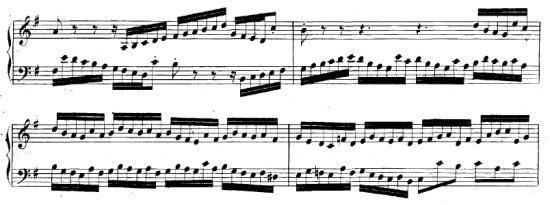

Apart from a contrasting middle section in E minor, the tonality throughout is resolutely that of G major. The use of broken chords recalls the writing in the first movements of the sixth trio sonata for organ BWV 530 and the third Brandenburg Concerto BWV 1048.

BWV 804 has the following musical structure:

- bars 1–4: subject in G major in right hand followed by response in D major in left hand
- bars 5–6: transition
- bars 7–10: subject in G major in left hand followed by response in D major in right hand
- bars 11–15: transition to E minor
- bars 16–19: subject in E minor in right hand followed by response in B minor in left hand
- bars 20–23: transition
- bars 24–25: subject in C major in right hand
- bars 26–27: transition
- bars 28–31: subject in G major right hand with canon at octave in left hand
- bars 32–33: transition
- bars 34–37: subject in right hand with stretto at octave in left hand after a quaver
- bars 38–39: subject in G major in right hand

=== Duetto IV BWV 805 ===
BWV 805 is a fugue in strict counterpoint in the key of A minor, 108 bars long. The 8 bar subject starts in minims with a second harmonic half in slow quavers. Bach introduced further "modern" elements in the semitone drops in the subject and later motifs (bars 4 and 18). Although all entries of the subject are either in A minor (tonic) or E minor (dominant), Bach adds chromaticism by flattening notes in the subject and sharpening notes during modulating passages. Despite being a rigorous composition with carefully devised invertible counterpoint, i.e. with parts that can be interchanged, in parts its style is similar to that of the bourée from the Overture in the French style, BWV 831 from Clavier-Übung II. There are three episodes which move between different keys and combine three new pairs of motifs, either 2 bars, 4 bars or 8 bars long, in highly original and constantly changing ways. The first episode starts in bar 18 below with the first pair of new motifs, the upper one characterised by an octave drop:

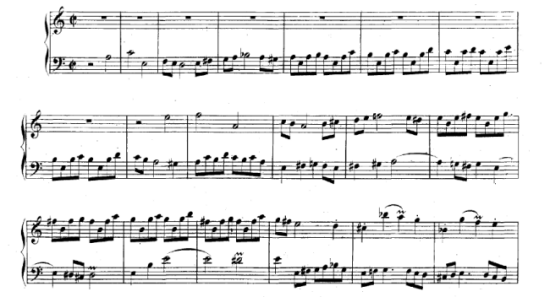

At the end of the first episode, the second harmonious pair of motifs is introduced:

The third pair of motifs, which allows significant modulation, appears for the first time in the second half of the second episode and is derived from the second half of the subject and countersubject:

The musical structure of BWV 805 has been analysed as follows:

- bars 1–8: subject in left hand, A minor
- bars 9–17: subject in right hand, countersubject in left hand, E minor
- bars 18–32: first episode—first motif (b. 18–25), second motif (b. 26–32)
- bars 33–40: subject in right hand, countersubject in left hand, A minor
- bars 41–48: subject in left hand, countersubject in right hand, E minor
- bars 49–69: second episode—first motif inverted (b. 49–56), second motif inverted (b. 57–63), third motif (b. 64–69)
- bars 70–77: subject in right hand, countersubject in left hand, E minor
- bars 78–95: third episode—first motif inverted (b. 78–81), first motif (b. 82–85), third motif inverted (86–92), followed by link
- bars 96–103: subject in left hand, countersubject in right hand, A minor
- bars 104–108: coda with neapolitan sixths in bar 105

== Reception and influence ==
=== Eighteenth century ===
Finally, Mr. ——— is the most eminent of the Musikanten in ———. He is an extraordinary artist on the clavier and on the organ, and he has until now encountered only one person with whom he can dispute the palm of superiority. I have heard this great man play on various occasions. One is amazed at his ability, and one can hardly conceive how it is possible for him to achieve such agility, with his fingers and with his feet, in the crossings, extensions, and extreme jumps that he manages, without mixing in a single wrong tone, or displacing his body by any violent movement. This great man would be the admiration of whole nations if he had more amenity, if he did not take away the natural element in his pieces by giving them a turgid and confused style, and if he did not darken their beauty by an excess of art.

— Johann Adolf Scheibe, 1737

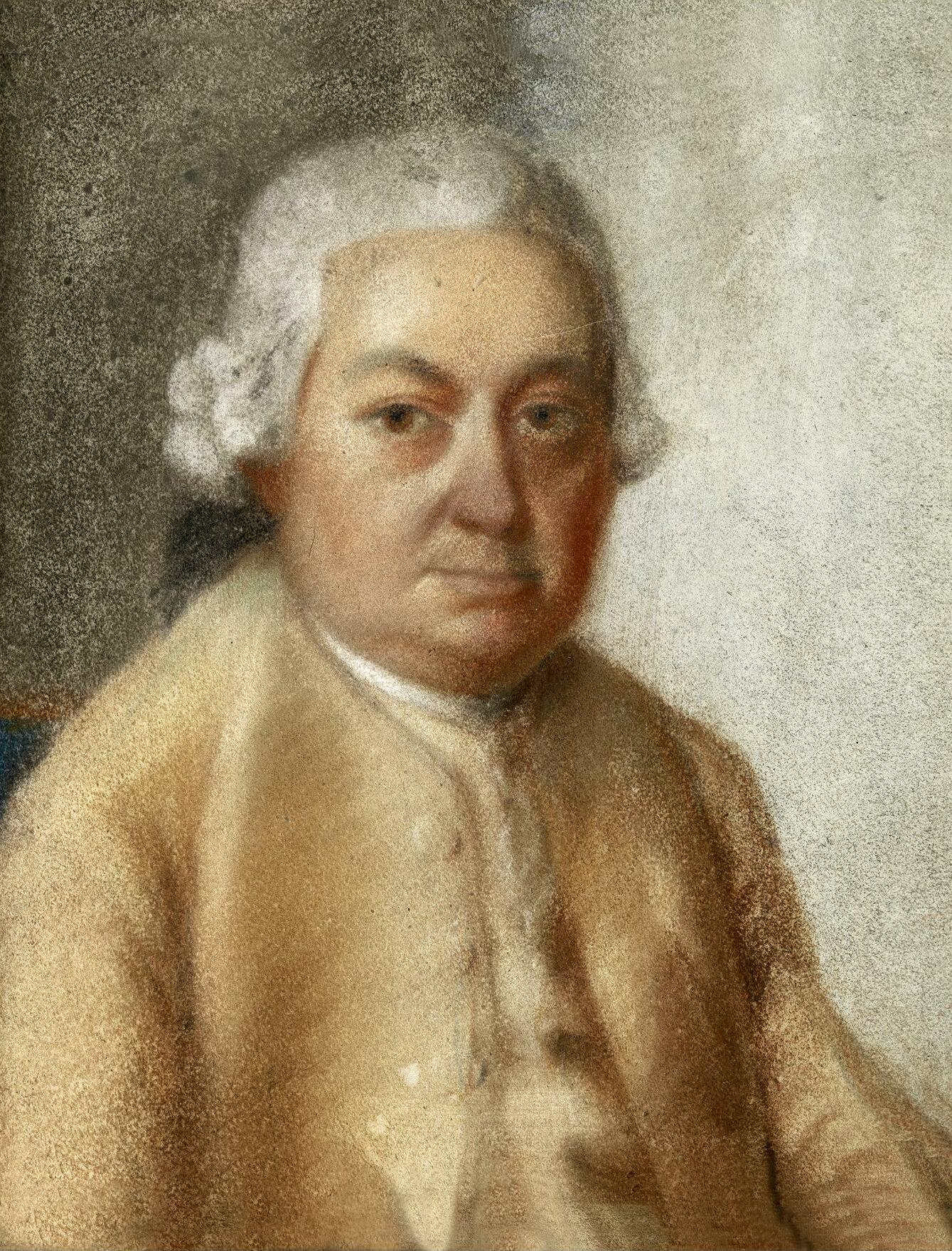
C. P. E. Bach

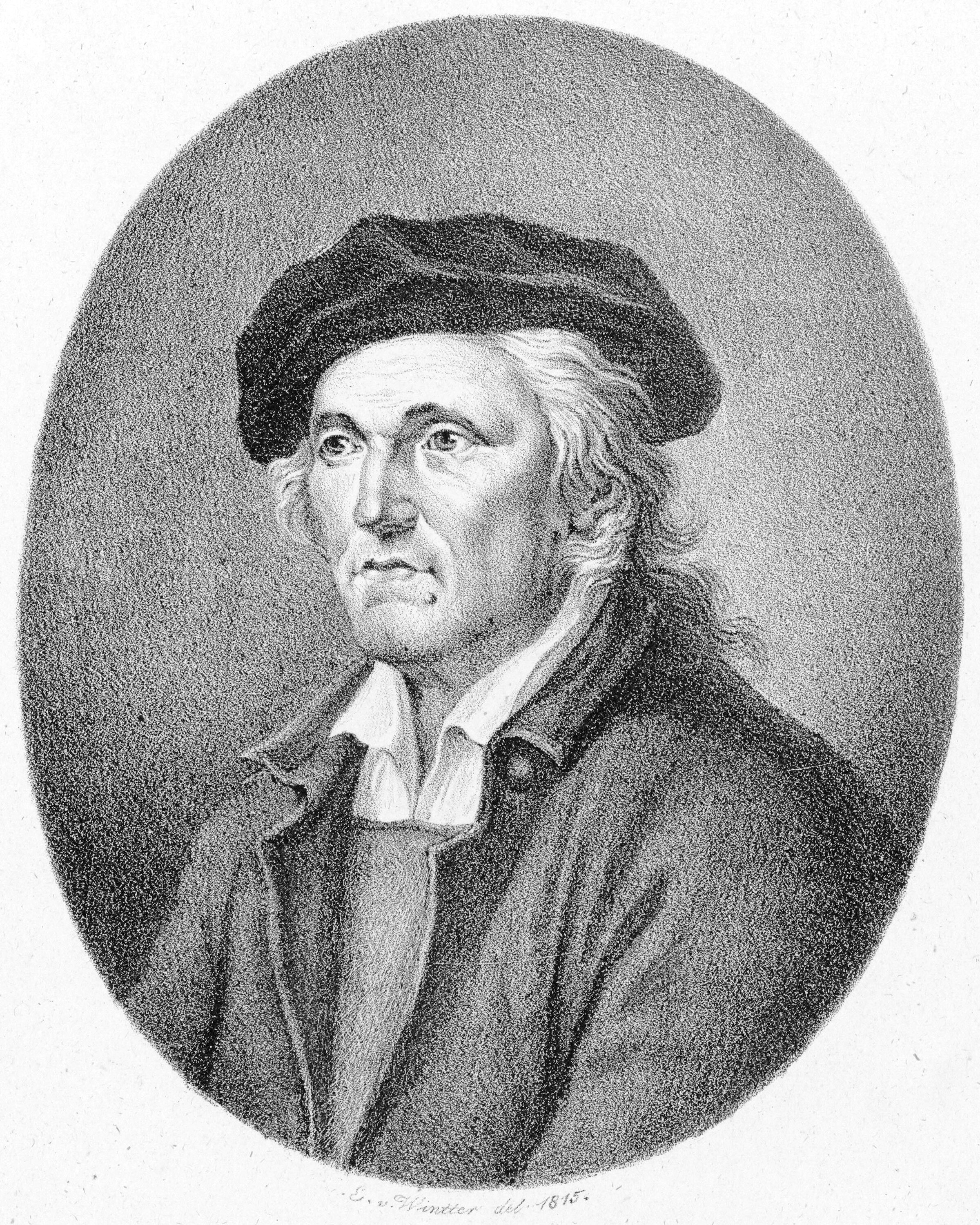
Johann Kirnberger

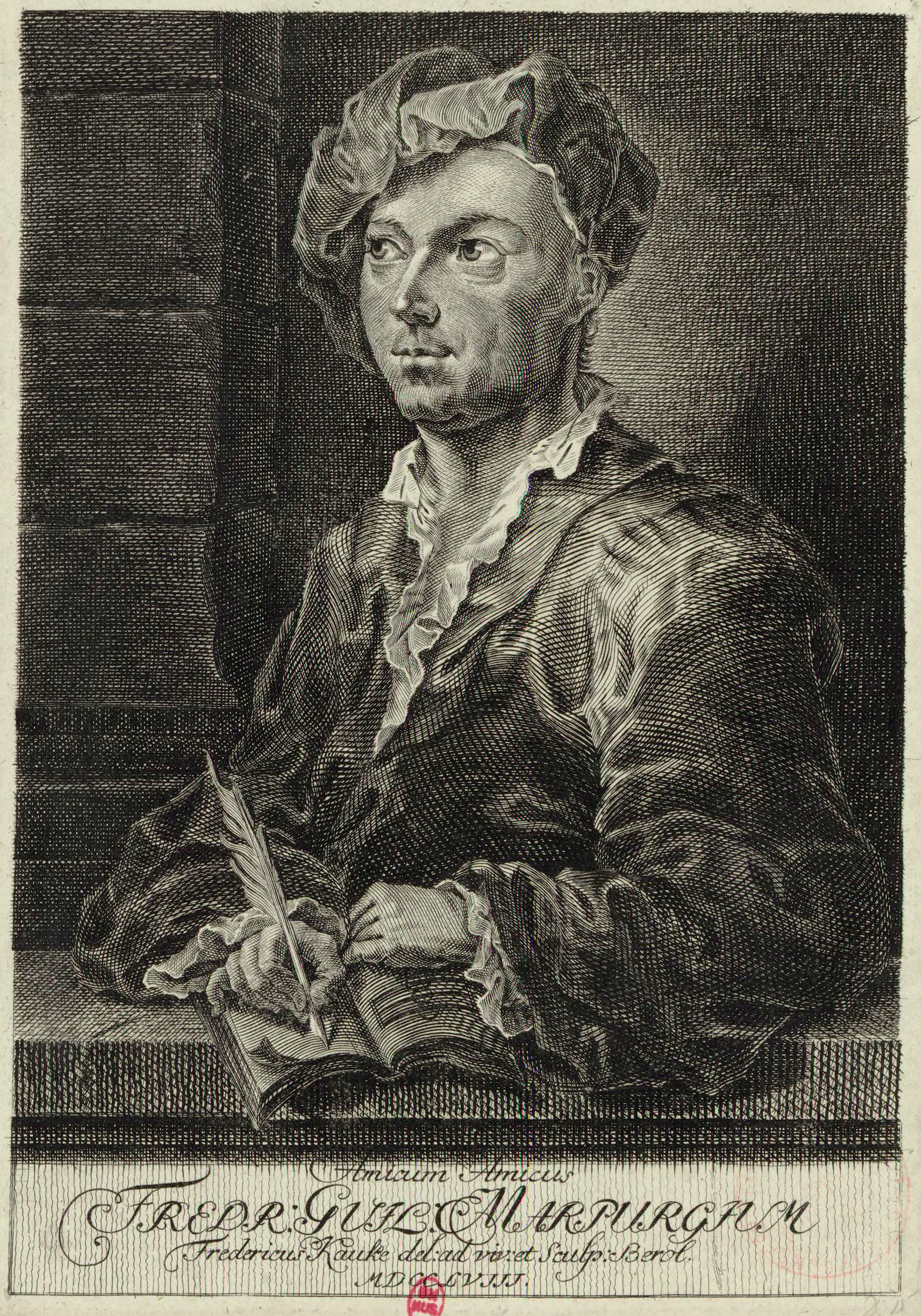
Friedrich Marpurg

In 1737, two years before the publication of Clavier-Übung III, Johann Adolf Scheibe had made the above notoriously unfavourable comparison between Bach and another composer of the time, now identified as Georg Frideric Handel. His comments represented a change in contemporary musical aesthetics: he advocated the simpler and more expressive galant style, which after Bach's death in 1750 would be further developed during the classical period, in preference to fugal or contrapuntal writing, which by then was considered old-fashioned and out-moded, too scholarly and conservative. Although Bach did not actively participate in the ensuing debate on musical styles, he did incorporate elements of this modern style in his later compositions, in particular in Clavier-Übung III. Bach's musical contributions, however, could only be properly assessed at the beginning of the 19th century, when his works became more widely available: up until then much of his musical output—in particular his vocal works—was relatively little known outside Leipzig.

From 1760 onwards a small group of ardent supporters became active in Berlin, keen to preserve his reputation and promulgate his oeuvre. The group centred around his son Carl Philipp Emanuel Bach, who in 1738 at the age of 24 had been appointed court harpsichordist at Potsdam to Frederick the Great, then crown prince before his accession to the throne in 1740. C.P.E. Bach remained in Berlin until 1768, when he was appointed Kapellmeister in Hamburg in succession to Georg Philipp Telemann. (His brother Wilhelm Friedemann Bach moved to Berlin in 1774, although not to general acclaim, despite his accomplishments as an organist.) Other prominent members of the group included Bach's former pupils Johann Friedrich Agricola, court composer, first director of the Royal Opera House in Berlin and collaborator with Emanuel on Bach's obituary (the Nekrolog, 1754), and more significantly Johann Philipp Kirnberger.

Kirnberger became Kapellmeister to the court in 1758 and music teacher of Frederick's niece, Anna Amalia. Not only did Kirnberger build up a large collection of Bach's manuscripts in the Amalien-Bibliothek, but with Friedrich Wilhelm Marpurg he promoted Bach's compositions through theoretical texts, concentrating in particular on counterpoint with a detailed analysis of Bach's methods. The first of the two volumes of Marpurg's Treatise on fugue (Abhandlung von der Fuge, 1753–1754) cites the opening segment of the six-part fugal chorale prelude Aus tiefer Noth BWV 686 as one of its examples. Kirnberger produced his own extensive tract on composition Die Kunst des reinen Satzes in der Musik (The true principles for the practice of harmony), twenty years later, between 1771 and 1779. In his treatise Marpurg had adopted some of the musical theories on the fundamental bass of Jean-Philippe Rameau from his Treatise on Harmony (1722) in explaining Bach's fugal compositions, an approach which Kirnberger rejected in his tract:

Rameau filled this theory with so many things that had no rhyme or reason that one must certainly wonder how such extravagant notions can have found belief and even champions among us Germans, since we have always had the greatest harmonists among us, and their manner of treating harmony was certainly not to be explained according to Rameau's principles. Some even went so far that they preferred to deny the soundness of a Bach in his procedure with respect to the treatment and progression of chords, rather than admit that the Frenchman could have erred.

This led to an acrimonious dispute in which both claimed to speak with Bach's authority. When Marpurg made the tactical error of suggesting that, "His famous son in Hamburg ought to know something about this, too," Kirnberger responded in the introduction to the second volume of his tract:

Moreover, what Mr. Bach, Capellmeister in Hamburg, thinks of the excellent work of Mr. Marpurg, is shown by some passages from a letter that this famous man has written to me: "The behaviour of Mr. Marpurg towards you is execrable." Further: "You may loudly proclaim that my basic principles and those of my late father are anti-Rameau."

Through Bach's pupils and family, copies of his keyboard works were disseminated and studied throughout Germany; the diplomat Baron van Swieten, Austrian envoy to the Prussian court from 1770 to 1777 and afterwards patron of Mozart, Haydn and Beethoven, was responsible for relaying copies from Berlin to Vienna. The reception of the works was mixed, partly because of their technical difficulty: composers like Mozart, Beethoven and Rust embraced these compositions, particularly The Well-Tempered Clavier; but, as Johann Adam Hiller reported in 1768, many amateur musicians found them too hard ("Sie sind zu schwer! Sie gefallen mir nicht").

Twenty-one prints of the original 1739 edition of Clavier-Übung III survive today. Because of its high price, this edition did not sell well: even 25 years later in 1764, C.P.E. Bach was still trying to dispose of copies. Because of changes in popular tastes after Bach's death, the publisher Johann Gottlob Immanuel Breitkopf, son of Bernhard Christoph Breitkopf, did not consider it economically viable to prepare new printed editions of Bach's works; instead he retained a master copy of Clavier-Übung III in his large library of original scores from which handwritten copies (hand-exemplar) could be ordered from 1763 onwards. A similar service was provided by the musical publishers Johann Christoph Westphal in Hamburg and Johann Carl Friedrich Rellstab in Berlin.

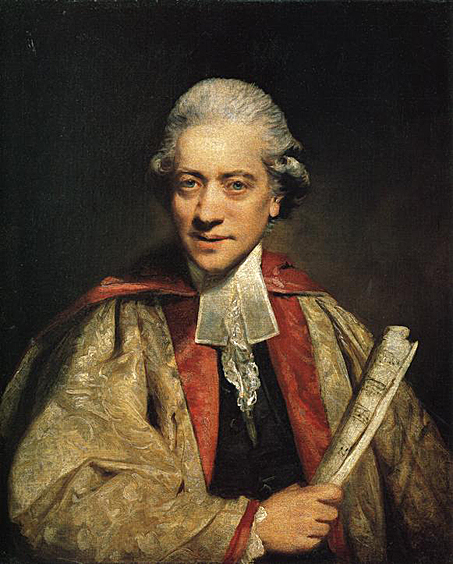
Charles Burney

Before 1800, there are very few reports of performances of Bach's works in England or of manuscript copies of his work. In 1770, Charles Burney, the musicologist and friend of Samuel Johnson and James Boswell, had made a tour of France and Italy. On his return in 1771 he published a report on his tour in The Present State of Music in France and Italy. Later that year in a letter to Christoph Daniel Ebeling, the music critic engaged in translating this work into German, Burney made one of his first references to Bach:

A long & laboured Fugue, recte et retro in 40 parts, may be a good Entertainment for the Eyes of a Critic, but can never delight the Ears of a Man of Taste. I was no less surprised than pleased to find Mr. C.P.E. Bach get out of the trammels of Fugues & crowded parts in which his father so excelled.

It was, however, only in the following year, during his tour of Germany and the Low Countries, that Burney received a copy of the first book of The Well-Tempered Clavier from C. P. E. Bach in Hamburg; according to his own reports, he was only to become familiar with its contents over thirty years later. He reported on his German tour in The Present State of Music in Germany, the Netherlands and United Provinces in 1773. The book contains the first English account of Bach's work and reflects the views commonly held at the time in England. Burney compared the learned style of Bach unfavourably with that of his son, whom he had visited:

How he formed his style, where he acquired all his taste and refinement, would be difficult to trace; he certainly neither inherited nor adopted them from his father, who was his only master; for that venerable musician, though unequalled in learning and contrivance, thought it so necessary to crowd into both hand all the harmony he could grasp, that he must inevitably have sacrificed melody and expression. Had the sone chosen a model, it would certainly have been his father, whom he highly reverenced; but as he has ever disdained imitation, he must have derive from nature alone, those fine feelings, that variety of new ideas, and selection of passages, which are so manifest in his compositions.

Burney summarised the musical contributions of J.S. Bach as follows:

Besides many excellent compositions for the church, this author produced Ricercari, consisting of preludes, fugues, upon two, three and four subjects; in Modo recto & contrario and in every one of the twenty-four keys. All the present organ-players of Germany are formed upon his school, as most of those on the harpsichord, clavichord and piano forte are upon that of his son, the admirable Carl. Phil. Emanuel Bach; so long known by the name of Bach of Berlin, but now music-director at Hamburg.

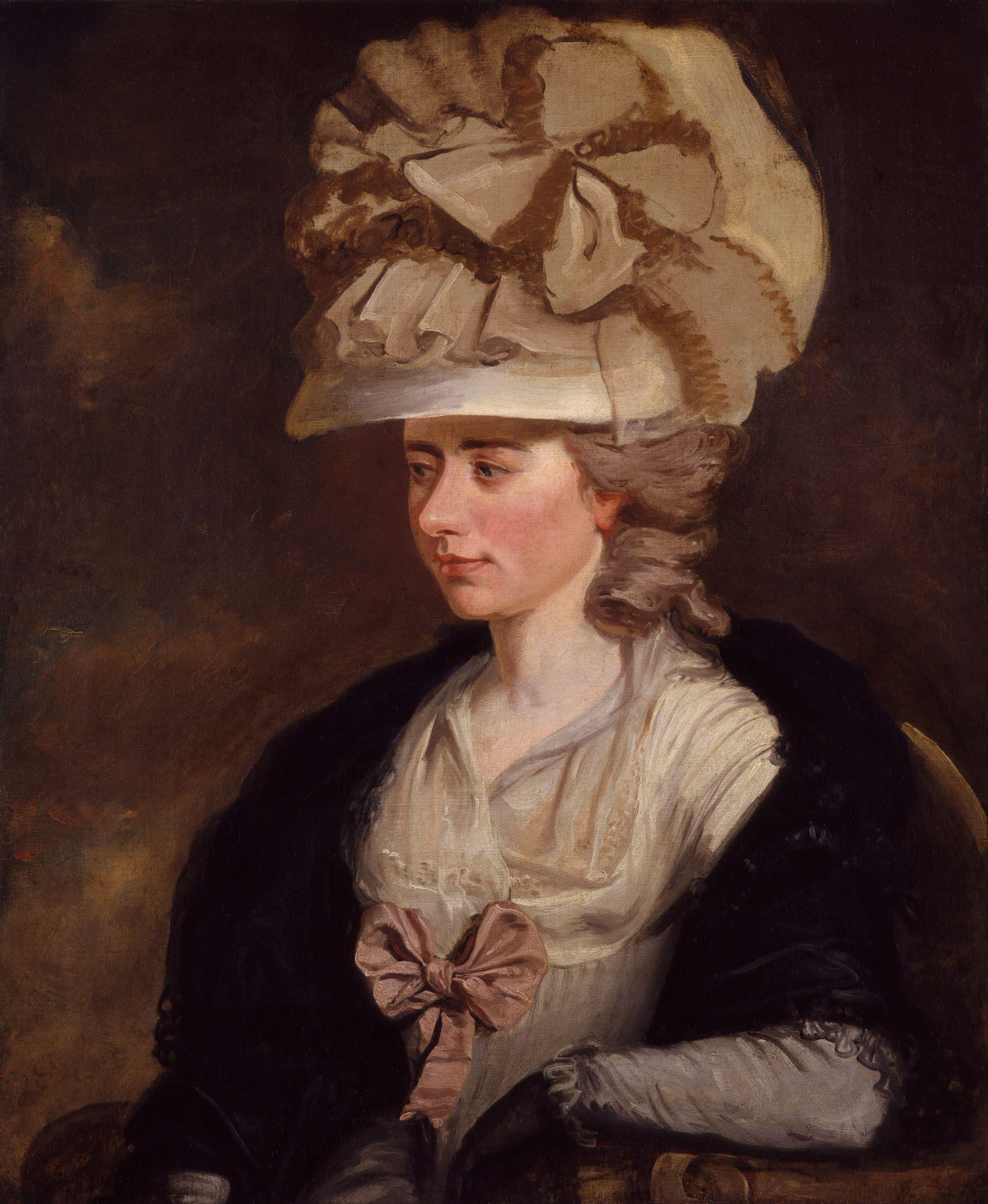
Fanny Burney

As it is known that at the time Burney knew hardly any of Bach's compositions, it appears that his opinions of Bach came second-hand: the first sentence was almost certainly lifted directly from the French translation of Marpurg's Treatise on fugue, to which he had referred earlier in the book for biographical details; and in 1771 he had acquired Scheibe's writings through Ebeling. In Germany Burney's book was not well received, infuriating even his friend Ebeling: in a passage that he changed in later editions, he had repeated without attribution comments from a letter of Louis Devisme, British plenipotentiary in Munich, that, "if innate genius exists, Germany is certainly not the seat of it; though it must be allowed, to be that of perseverance and application." Once aware of the offence this might cause to Germans, Burney had marked with pencil the offending passages in the copy of his daughter Fanny Burney, when in 1786 she became lady-in-waiting to Queen Charlotte, wife of George III. Later that year, to Fanny's horror, the Queen requested that Fanny show her copy to her daughter Princess Elizabeth. The book was viewed by both the King and Queen, who accepted Fanny's hastily invented explanations of the markings; she similarly managed to excuse herself when Princess Elizabeth later read all the marked passages assuming them to be Fanny's favourites.

Burney was aware of George III's preference for Handel when in 1785 he wrote in his account of the 1784 Handel Commemoration that "in his full, masterly and excellent organ-fugues, upon the most natural and pleasing subjects, he has surpassed Frescobaldi, and even Sebastian Bach, and others of his countrymen, the most renowned for abilities in this difficult and elaborate species of composition." His account was translated into German by Hiller. Writing anonymously in the Allgemeine Deutsche Bibliothek in 1788, C.P.E. Bach angrily responded that "there is nothing to be seen but partiality, and of any close acquaintance with the principal works of J.S. Bach for organ we find in Dr. Burney's writings no trace." Undeterred by such comments in 1789, a year after C.P.E. Bach's death, Burney echoed Scheibe's earlier comparison of Bach and Handel when he wrote in his General History of Music:

The very terms of Canon and Fugue imply restraint and labour. Handel was perhaps the only great Fughuist, exempt from pedantry. He seldom treated barren or crude subjects; his themes being almost always natural and pleasing. Sebastian Bach, on the contrary, like Michel Angelo in painting, disdained facility so much, that his genius never stooped to the easy and graceful. I never have seen a fugue by this learned and powerful author upon a motivo, that is natural and chantant; or even an easy and obvious passage, that is not loaded with crude an difficult accompaniments.

Burney reflected the English predilection for opera when he added:

If Sebastian Bach and his admirable son Emmanuel, instead of being music-directors in commercial cities, had been fortunately employed to compose for the stage and public of great capitals, such as Naples, Paris, or London, and for performers of the first class, they would doubtless have simplified their style more to the level of their judges; the one would have sacrificed all unmeaning art and contrivance, and the other have been less fantastical and recherché; and both, by writing a style more popular, would have extended their fame, and been indisputably the greatest musicians of the eighteenth century.

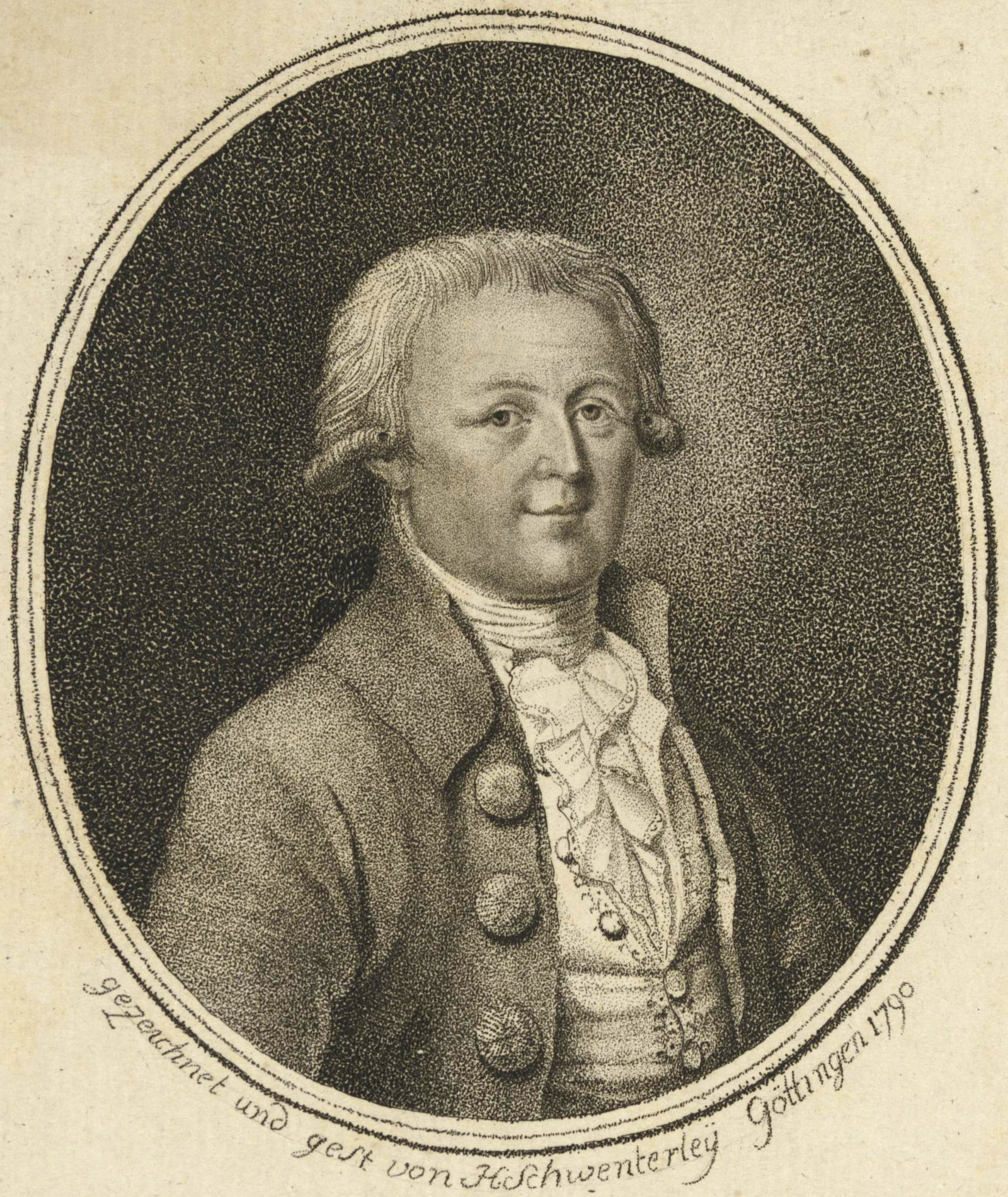
Johann Nikolaus Forkel

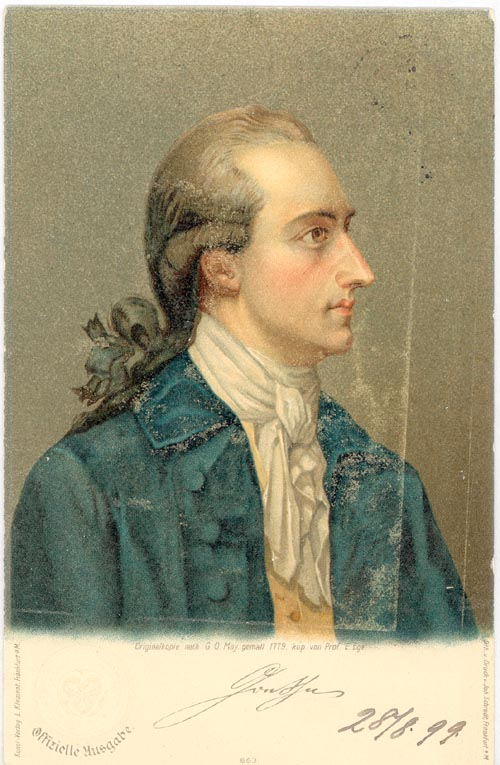
J. W. von Goethe

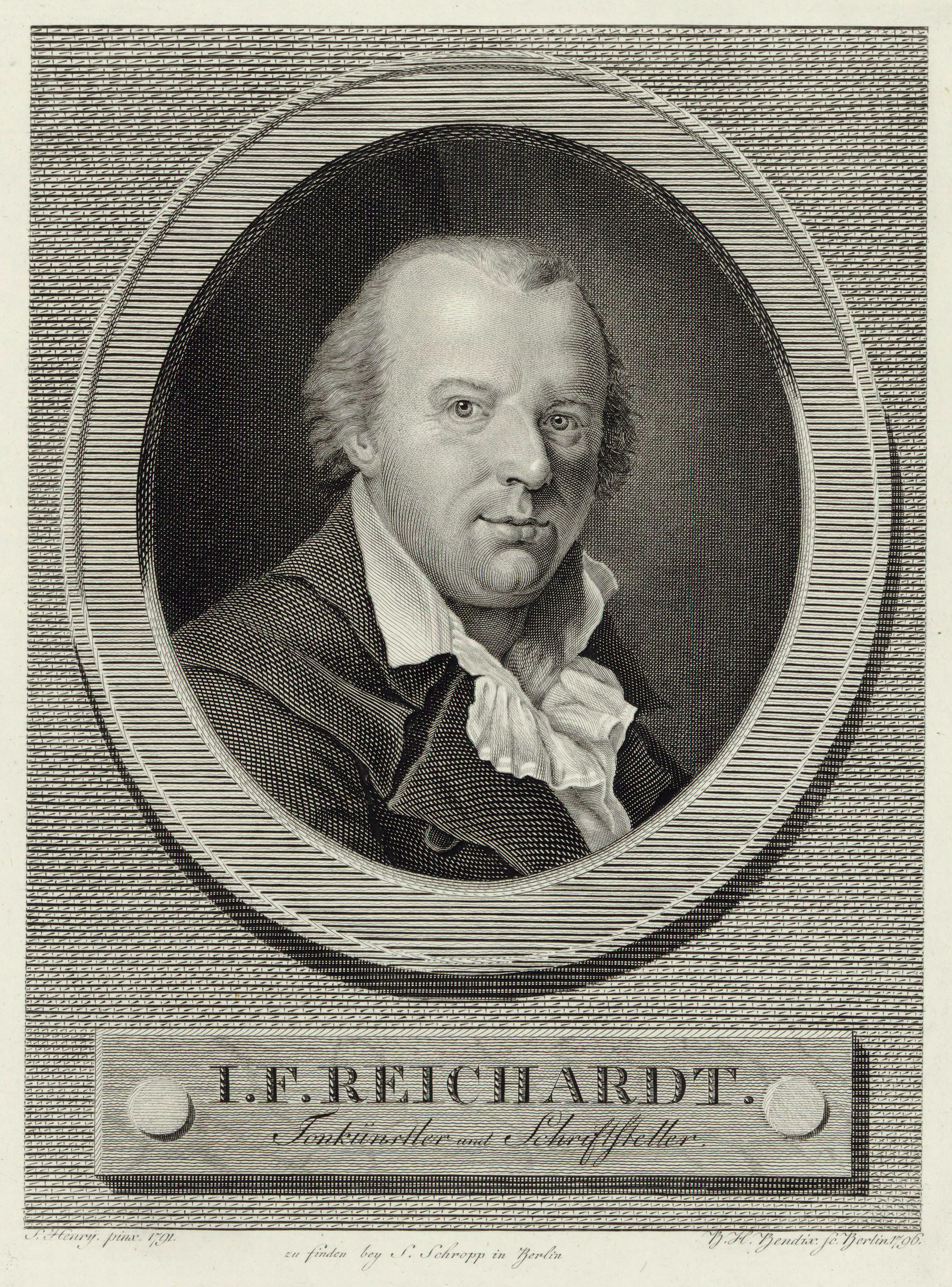
J. F. Reichardt

Johann Nikolaus Forkel, from 1778 the director of music in the University of Göttingen, was another promoter and collector of Bach's music. An active correspondent with both of Bach's sons in Berlin, he published the first detailed biography of Bach in 1802, Bach: On Johann Sebastian Bach's Life, Art and Works: For Patriotic Admirers of True Musical Art, including an appreciation of Bach's keyboard and organ music and ending with the injunction, "This man, the greatest orator-poet that ever addressed the world in the language of music, was a German! Let Germany be proud of him! Yes, proud of him, but worthy of him too!" In 1779, Forkel published a review of Burney's General History of Music in which he criticized Burney for dismissing German composers as "dwarves or musical ogres" because "they did not skip and dance before his eyes in a dainty manner"; instead he suggested it was more appropriate to view them as "giants".

Among his criticisms of Bach in the 1730s, Scheibe had written, "We know of composers who see it as an honour to be able to compose incomprehensible and unnatural music. They pile up musical figures. They make unusual embellishments. ... Are these not truly musical Goths!" Until the 1780s, the use of the word "gothic" in music was pejorative. In his entry for "harmony" in the influential Dictionnaire de Musique (1768), Jean-Jacques Rousseau, a fierce critic of Rameau, described counterpoint as a "gothic and barbaric invention", the antithesis of the melodic galante style. In 1772, Johann Wolfgang von Goethe gave a fundamentally different view of "gothic" art that would achieve widespread acceptance during the classical-romantic movement. In his celebrated essay on the cathedral in Strasbourg, where he was a student, Goethe was one of the first writers to connect gothic art with the sublime:

The first time I went to the minster I was full of the common notions of good taste. From hearsay I respected the harmony of mass, the purity of forms, and I was the sworn enemy of the confused caprices of Gothic ornament. Under the term gothic, like the article in a dictionary, I threw together all the synonymous misunderstandings, such as undefined, disorganized, unnatural, patched-together, tacked on, overloaded, which had gone through my head. ... How surprised I was when I was confronted by it! The impression which filled my soul was whole and large, and of a sort that—since it was composed of a thousand harmonizing details—I could relish and enjoy, but by no means identify and explain. ... How often have I returned from all sides, from all distances, in all lights, to contemplate its dignity and magnificence. It is hard on the spirit of man when his brother's work is so sublime that he can only bow and worship. How often has the evening twilight soothed with its friendly quiet my eyes, tired-out with questing, by blending the scattered parts into masses which now stood simple and large before my soul, and at once my powers unfolded rapturously to enjoy and understand.

In 1782, Johann Friedrich Reichardt, since 1775 the successor to Agricola as Capellmeister in the court of Frederic the Great, quoted this passage from Goethe in the Musicalisches Kunstmagazin to describe his personal reactions to the instrumental fugues of Bach and Handel. He prefaced his eulogy with a description of Bach as the greatest counterpuntalist ("harmonist") of his age:

There has never been a composer, not even the best and deepest of the Italians, who so exhausted all the possibilities of our harmony as did J. S. Bach. Almost no suspension is possible that he did not make use of, and he employed every proper harmonic art and every improper harmonic artifice a thousand times, in earnest and in jest, with such boldness and individuality that the greatest harmonist, if called upon to supply a missing measure in the theme of one of his greatest works, could not be entirely sure of having supplied it exactly as Bach had done. Had Bach had the high sense of truth and the deep feeling for expression that animated Handel, he would have been far greater even than Handel himself; but as it is, he is only much more erudite and industrious.

The unfavourable comparison to Handel was removed in a later reprinting in 1796, following adverse anonymous remarks in the Allgemeine Deutsche Bibliothek. Reichardt's comparison between Bach's music and the Gothic cathedral would often be repeated by composers and music critics. His student, the writer, composer and music critic E.T.A. Hoffmann, saw in Bach's music "the bold and wonderful, romantic cathedral with all its fantastic embellishments, which, artistically swept up into a whole, proudly and magnificently rise in the air". Hoffmann wrote of the sublime in Bach's music—the "infinite spiritual realm" in Bach's "mystical rules of counterpoint".

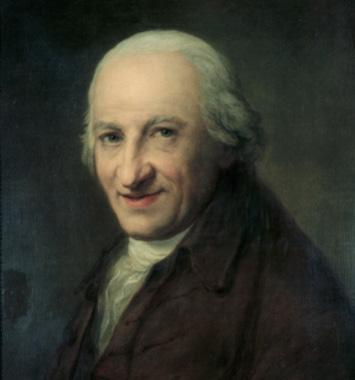
Carl Fasch

Another musician in C.P.E. Bach's circle was his friend Carl Friedrich Christian Fasch, son of the violinist and composer Johann Friedrich Fasch, who, on the death of Kuhnau in 1722, had turned down the post, later awarded to Bach, of kantor at the Thomaskirche, where he himself had been trained. From 1756 Carl Fasch shared the role of harpsichord accompanist to Frederick the Great at Potsdam with C.P.E. Bach. He briefly succeeded Agricola as director of the Royal Opera in 1774 for two years. In 1786. the year of Frederick the Great's death, Hiller organised a monumental performance in Italian of Handel's Messiah in a Berlin cathedral, recreating the scale of the 1784 London Handel Commemoration described in Burney's detailed account of 1785. Three years later in 1789, Fasch started an informal group in Berlin, formed from singing students and music lovers, that met for rehearsals in private homes. In 1791, with the introduction of a "presence book", it became officially known as the Sing-Akademie zu Berlin and two years later was granted its own rehearsal room in the Royal Academy of Arts in Berlin. As a composer, Fasch had learnt the old methods of counterpoint from Kirnberger and, like the Academy of Ancient Music in London, his initial purpose in founding the Sing-Akademie was to revive interest in neglected and rarely performed sacred vocal music, particularly that of J.S. Bach, Graun and Handel. The society subsequently built up an extensive library of baroque music of all types, including instrumental music.

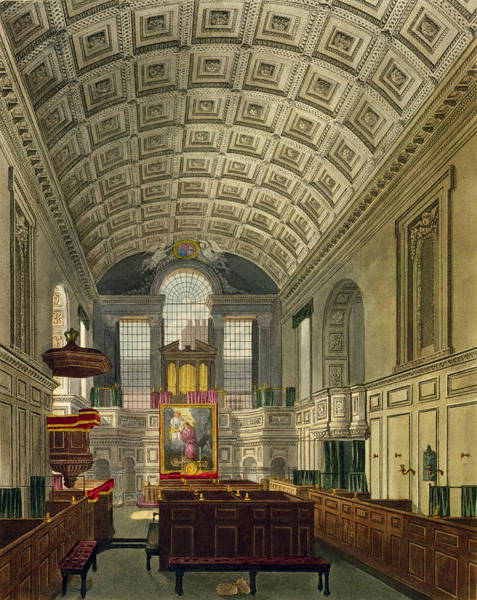
Interior of the Royal German Chapel, St James's Palace

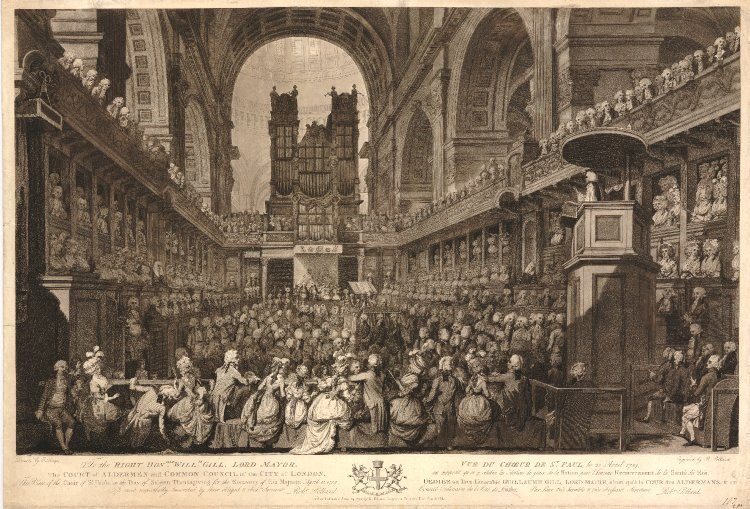
Thanksgiving service in 1789 for the recovery of George III in St Paul's Cathedral. The Grand Organ, built by Father Smith with a case designed by Christopher Wren, can be seen in the background.

Despite Burney's antipathy towards Bach prior to 1800, there was an "awakening" of interest in the music of Bach in England, spurred on by the presence of émigré musicians from Germany and Austria, trained in the musical tradition of Bach. From 1782 Queen Charlotte, a dedicated keyboard player, had as music teacher the German-born organist Charles Frederick Horn; and in the same year Augustus Frederic Christopher Kollmann was summoned by George III from the Electorate of Hanover to act as organist and schoolmaster at the Royal German Chapel at St James's Palace. It is probable that they were instrumental in acquiring for her in 1788 a bound volume from Westphal of Hamburg containing Clavier-Übung III in addition to both books of The Well-Tempered Clavier. Other German musicians moving in royal circles included Johann Christian Bach, Carl Friedrich Abel, Johann Christian Fischer, Frederick de Nicolay, Wilhelm Cramer and Johann Samuel Schroeter.

More significant for the 19th-century English Bach revival was the presence of a younger generation of German-speaking musicians in London, well versed in the theoretical writings of Kirnberger and Marpurg on counterpoint but not dependent on royal patronage; these included John Casper Heck (c. 1740 – 1791), Charles Frederick Baumgarten (1738–1824) and Joseph Diettenhofer (c. 1743 – c. 1799). Heck in particular promoted fugues in his treatise "The Art of Playing the Harpsichord" (1770), describing them later as "a particular stile of music peculiar to the Organ than the Harpsichord"; in his biographical entry for Bach in the 1780s in the Musical Library and Universal Magazine, he gave examples of counterpoint from Bach's late period (Canonic Variations, The Art of Fugue). Diettenhofer prepared A Selection of Ten Miscellaneous Fugues, including his own completion of the unfinished Contrapunctus XIV BWV 1080/19 from The Art of Fugue; prior to their publication in 1802 these were "tried at the Savoy Church, Strand before several Organists and eminent Musicians ... who were highly gratified and recommended their Publication." The enthusiasm of these German musicians was shared by the organist Benjamin Cooke and his student the organist and composer John Wall Calcott. Cooke knew them through the Royal Society of Musicians and had himself published a version of The Art of Fugue. Calcott corresponded with Kollmann about the musical theories of the Bach school. In 1798, he was one of the founding members of the Concentores Society, a club with a limited membership of twelve professional musicians, dedicated to composition in counterpoint and the stile antico.

=== Nineteenth and early twentieth century ===
==== Germany ====
But it is only at his organ that he appears to be at his most sublime, most audacious, in his own element. Here he knows neither limits nor goals and works for centuries to come.

— Robert Schumann, Neue Zeitschrift, 1839

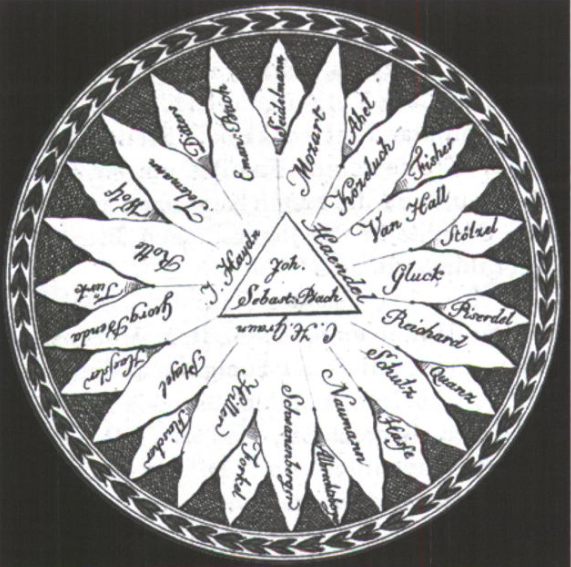
Kollmann, 1799: Engraving of the Sun with Bach at the centre, included by Forkel in the Allgem. Mus. Zeitung

A new printed "movable type" edition of Clavier-Übung III, omitting the duets BWV 802–805, was produced by Ambrosius Kühnel in 1804 for the Bureau de Musique in Leipzig, his joint publishing venture with Franz Anton Hoffmeister that later became the music publishing firm of C.F. Peters. Previously in 1802 Hoffmeister and Kühnel and had published a collection of Bach's keyboard music, including the Inventions and Sinfonias and both books of The Well-Tempered Clavier, with Johann Nikolaus Forkel acting as advisor. (The first prelude and fugue BWV 870 from The Well-Tempered Clavier II was published for the first time in 1799 by Kollmann in London. The whole of Book II was published in 1801 in Bonn by Simrock, followed by Book I; slightly later Nägeli came out with a third edition in Zürich.) Hoffmeister and Kühnel did not take up Forkel's suggestion of including in their fifteenth volume the four duets BWV 802–805, which were only published by Peters much later in 1840. Nine of the chorale preludes BWV 675–683 were printed in the four volume Breitkopf and Härtel collection of chorale preludes prepared between 1800 and 1806 by Johann Gottfried Schicht. Forkel and Kollmann corresponded during this period: they shared the same enthusiasm for Bach and the publication of his works. When Forkel's biography of Bach appeared in Germany in 1802, his publishers Hoffmeister and Kühnel wished to have control over translations into English and French. No complete authorized English translation was produced at the time. In 1812, Kollmann used parts of the biography in a long article on Bach in the Quarterly Musical Register; and an unauthorized anonymous English translation was published by Boosey & Company in 1820.

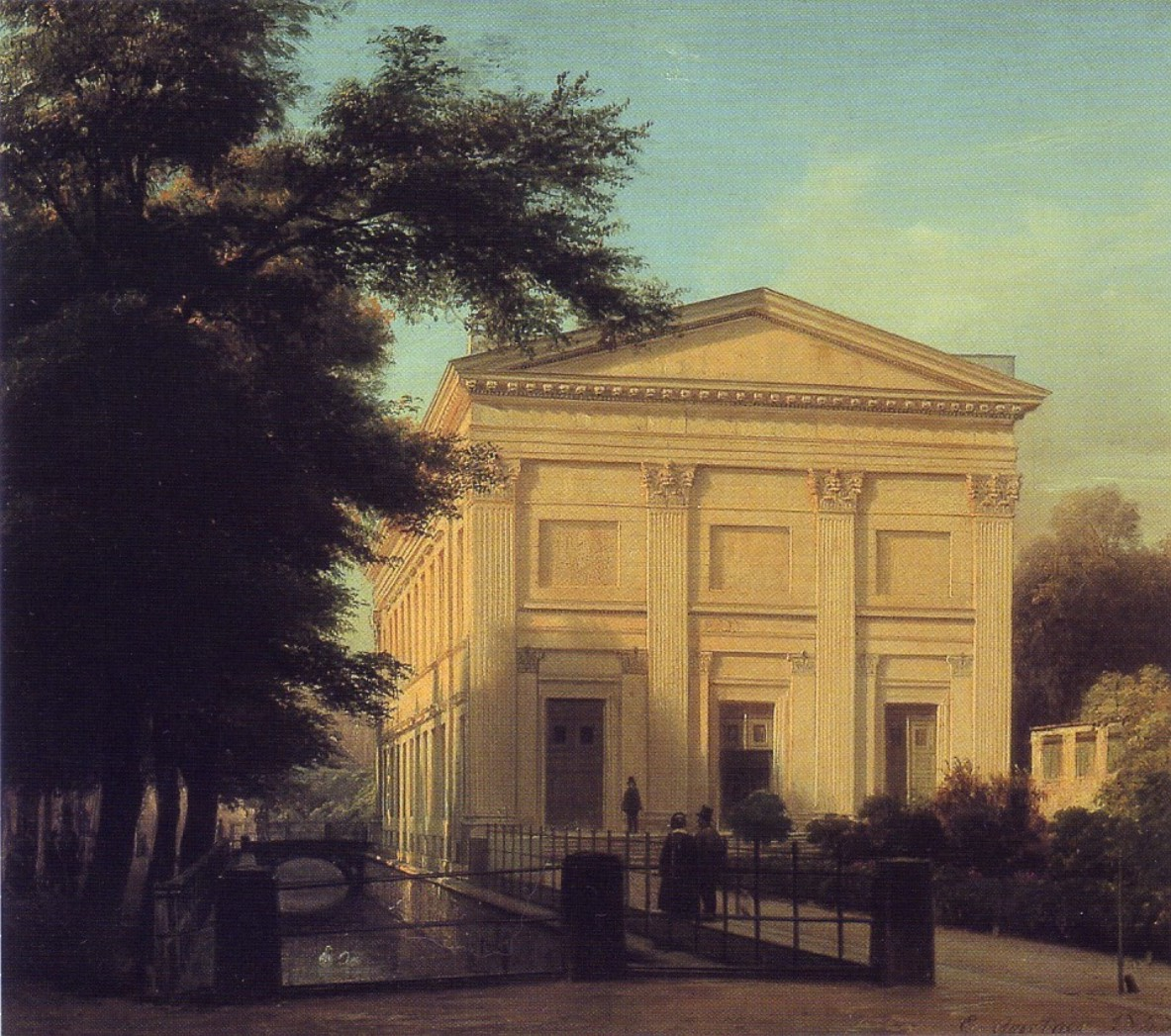
Sing-Akademie in 1843

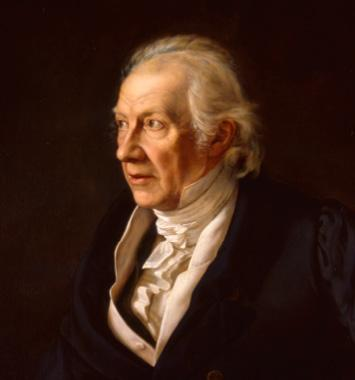
Carl Friedrich Zelter

In Berlin, on the death of Fasch in 1800, his assistant Carl Friedrich Zelter took over as the director of the Sing-Akademie. The son of a mason, he himself had been brought up as a master mason, but had cultivated his musical interests in secret, eventually taking composition classes with Fasch. He had been linked to the Sing-Akademie for years and had acquired a reputation as one of the foremost experts on Bach in Berlin. In 1799, he started a correspondence with Goethe on the aesthetics of music, particularly the music of Bach, which was to last until both friends died in 1832. Although Goethe had a late training in music, he considered it an essential element in his life, arranging concerts at his home and attending them elsewhere. In 1819, Goethe described how the organist from Berka, Heinrich Friedrich Schütz, trained by Bach's student Kittel, would serenade him for hours with the music of the masters, from Bach to Beethoven, so that Goethe could acquaint himself with music from a historical perspective. In 1827, he wrote:

On this occasion I recalled the good organist of Berka; for it was there, in perfect repose without extraneous disturbance, that I first formed an impression of your great maestro. I said to myself, it is as if the eternal harmony were conversing with itself, as it may have done in God's breast before the creation of the world; that is the way it move deep within me, and it was if I neither possessed or needed ears, nor any other sense—least of all, the eyes.

Commenting in the same year on Bach's writing for the organ, Zelter wrote to Goethe:

The organ is Bach's own peculiar soul, into which he breathes immediately the living breath. His theme is the feeling just born, which, like the spark from the stone, invariably springs forth, from the first chance pressure of the foot upon the pedals. Thus by degrees he warms to his subject, till he has isolated himself, and feels alone, and then an inexhaustible stream passes out into the ocean.

Zelter insisted on the pedals as the key to Bach's organ writing: "One might say of old Bach, that the pedals were the ground-element of the development of his unfathomable intellect, and that without feet, he could never have attained his intellectual height."

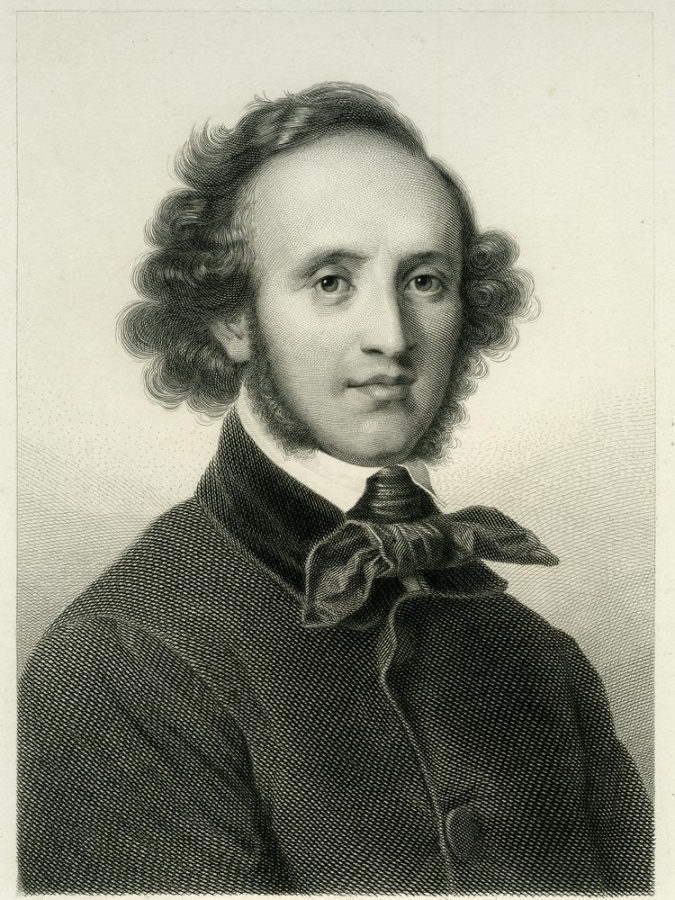
Felix Mendelssohn

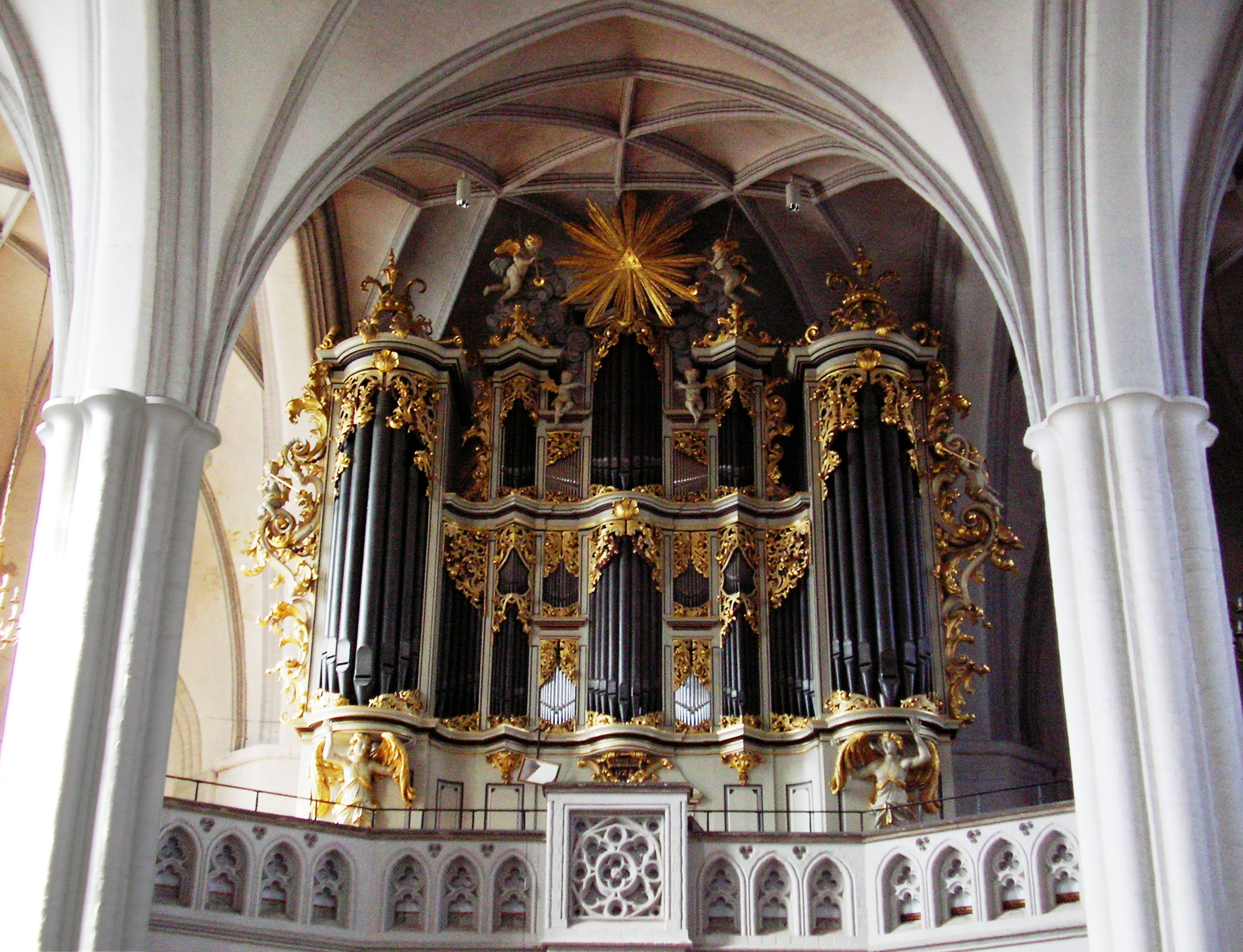
Organ in the Marienkirche, Berlin

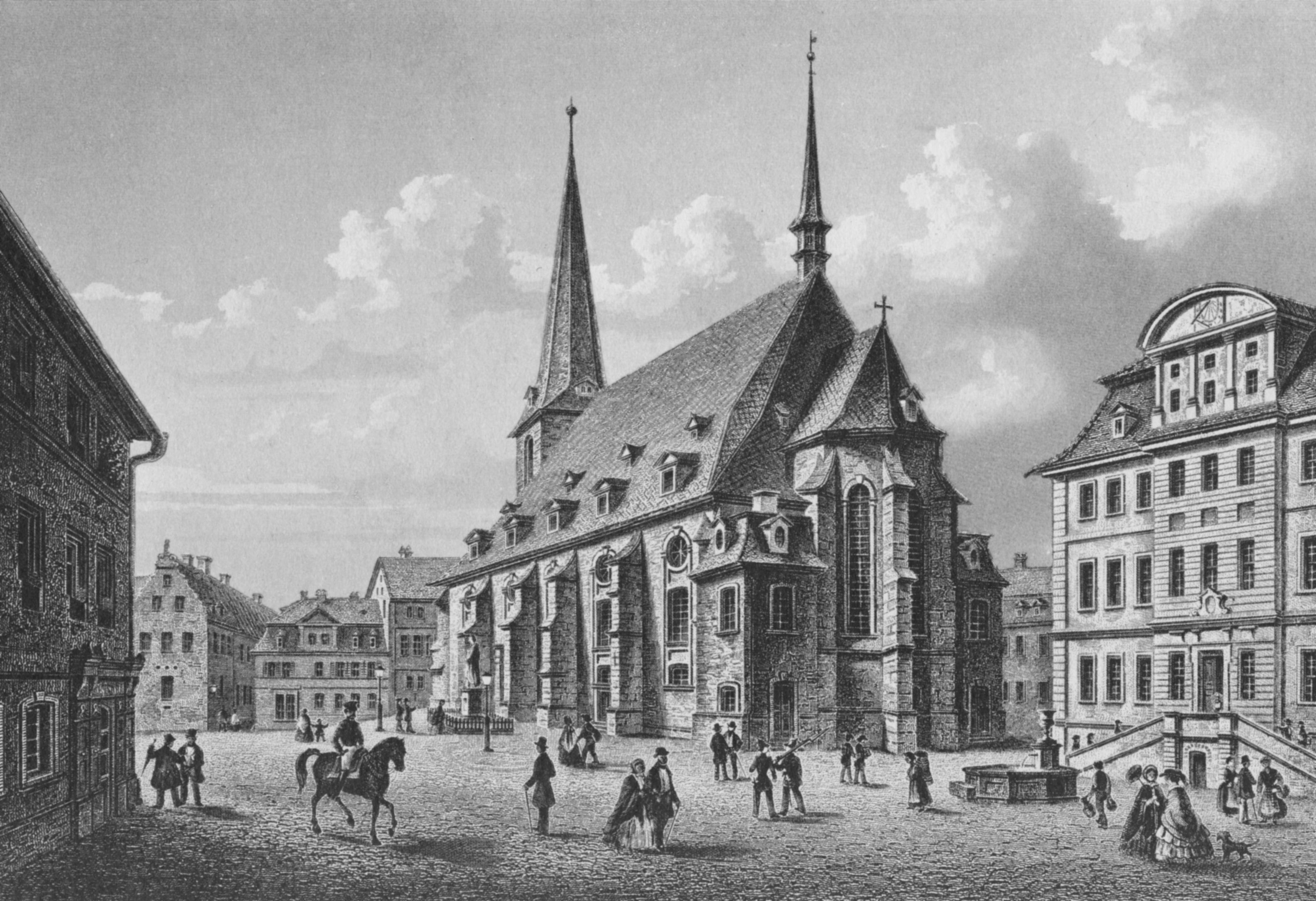
Engraving of the Church of St Peter and St Paul in Weimar, 1840

Zelter was instrumental in building up the Sing-Akademie, broadening their repertoire to instrumental music and encouraging the growing library, another important repository for Bach manuscripts. Zelter had been responsible for Mendelssohn's father Abraham Mendelssohn becoming a member of the Sing-Akademie in 1796. As a consequence, one of the major new forces behind the library became Sara Levy, the great-aunt of Felix Mendelssohn, who had assembled one of the most-important private collections of 18th-century music in Europe. An accomplished harpsichordist, Sara Levy's teacher had been Wilhelm Friedemann Bach and she had been a patroness of C.P.E. Bach, circumstances which gave her family close contacts with Bach and resulted in his music enjoying a privileged status in the Mendelssohn household. Felix's mother Lea, who had studied under Kirnberger, gave him his first music lessons. In 1819, Zelter was appointed as the composition teacher of Felix and his sister Fanny; he taught counterpoint and music theory according to the methods of Kirnberger. Felix's piano teacher was Ludwig Berger, a pupil of Muzio Clementi, and his organ teacher was August Wilhelm Bach (unrelated to J.S. Bach), who had himself studied musical theory under Zelter. A.W. Bach was organist of the Marienkirche, Berlin, which had an organ built in 1723 by Joachim Wagner. Mendelssohn's organ lessons were conducted on the Wagner organ, with Fanny present; they commenced in 1820 and lasted for less than two years. It is probable that he learnt some of J. S. Bach's organ works, which had remained in the repertoire of many Berlin organists; his choice would have been limited, because at that stage his pedal technique was still rudimentary.

In autumn 1821 the twelve-year-old Mendelssohn accompanied Zelter on a trip to Weimar, stopping on the way in Leipzig where they were shown the cantor's room in the choir school of the Thomaskirche by Bach's successor Schicht. They stayed two weeks in Weimar with Goethe, to whom Mendelssohn played extensively on the piano each day. All Mendelssohn's music lessons stopped by summer 1822 when his family left for Switzerland. In the 1820s, Mendelssohn visited Goethe four more times in Weimar, the last time being in 1830, a year after his resounding success in reviving Bach's St Matthew Passion in Berlin, with the collaboration of Zelter and members of the Sing-Akademie. On this last trip, again by way of Leipzig, he stayed two weeks in Weimar and had daily meetings with Goethe, by then in his eighties. He later gave an account to Zelter of a visit to the church of St Peter and St Paul where Bach's cousin Johann Gottfried Walther had been organist and where his two eldest sons had been baptized:

One day Goethe asked me if I would not care to pay a compliment to craftsmanship and call on the organist, who might let me see and hear the organ in the town church. I did so, and the instrument gave me great pleasure ... The organist gave me the choice of hearing something learned or for the people ... so I asked for something learned. But it was not much to be proud of. He modulated around enough to make one giddy, but nothing unusual came of it; he made a number of entries, but no fugue was forthcoming. When my turn came, I let loose with the D minor toccata of Bach and remarked that this was at the same time something learned and for the people too, at least some of them. But see, I had hardly started to play when the superintendent dispatched his valet downstairs with the message that this playing had to be stopped right away because it was a weekday and he could not study with that much noise going on. Goethe was very much amused by this story.

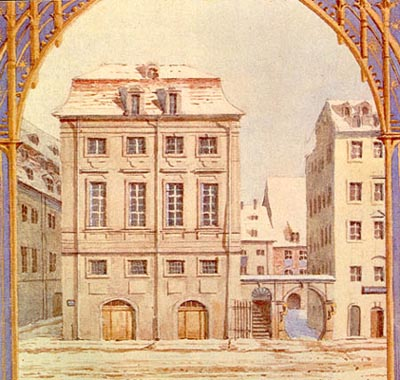
Felix Mendelssohn, 1836: watercolour of the Gewandhaus

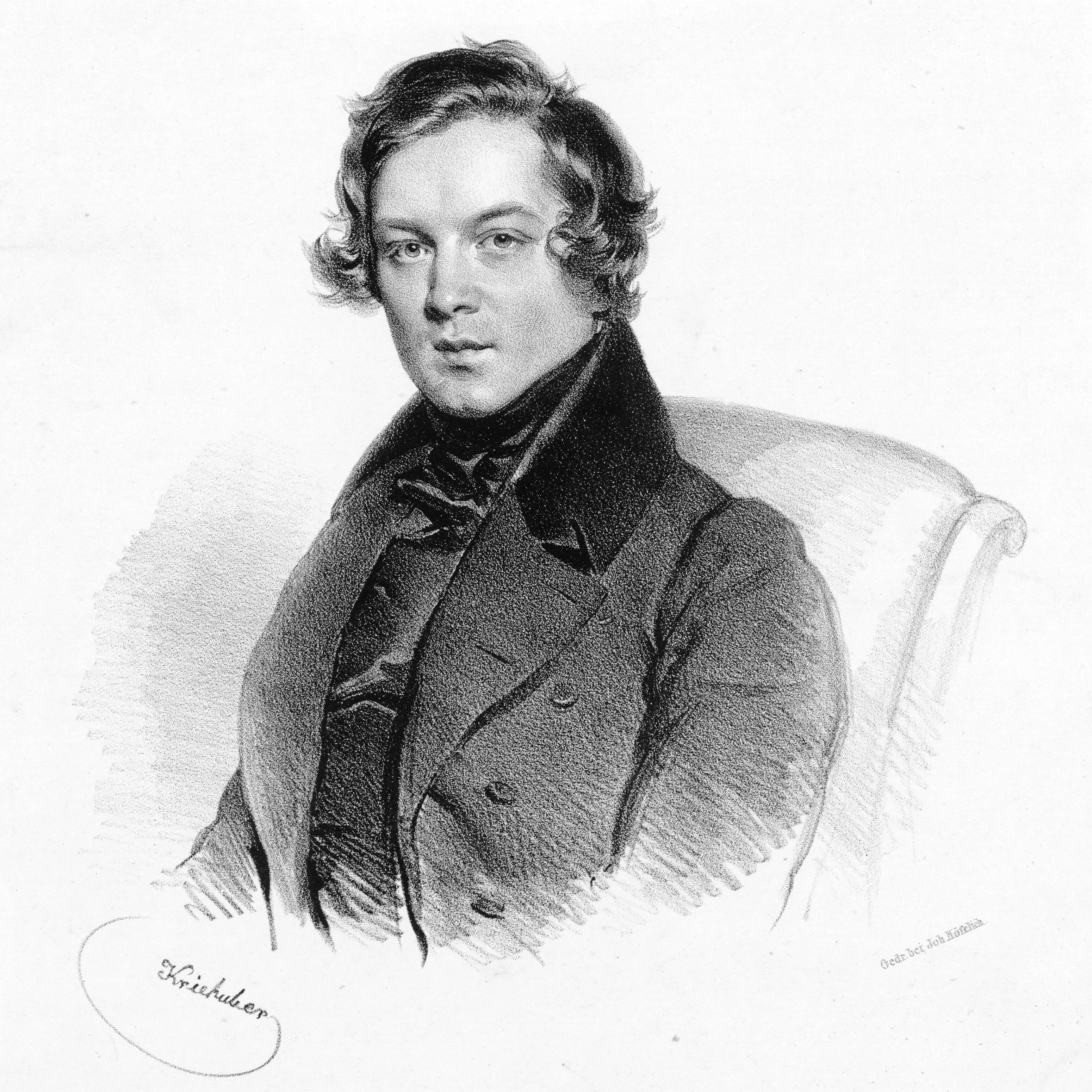
Robert Schumann

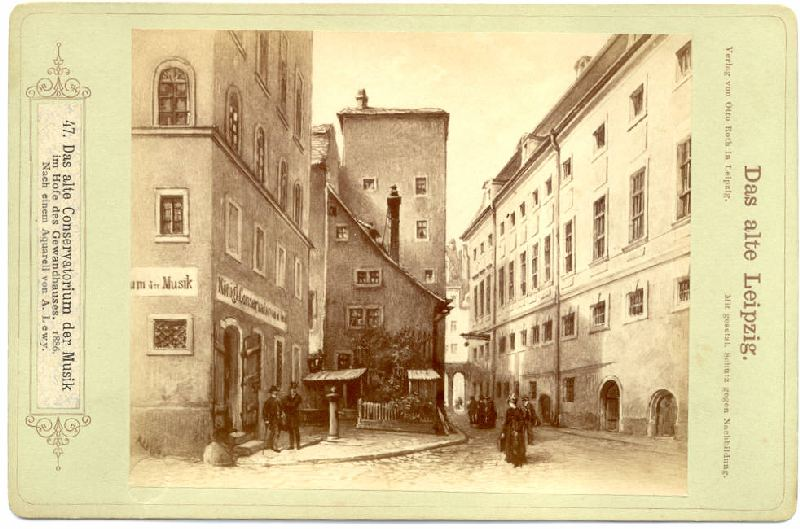
Original Leipzig Conservatory in the courtyard of the Gewandhaus

In 1835, Mendelssohn was appointed director of the Gewandhaus Orchester in Leipzig, a post he held until his death in 1847 at the age of 38. He soon met other Bach enthusiasts including Robert Schumann, one year his junior, who had moved to Leipzig in 1830. Having been taught piano by J.G. Kuntsch, organist at the Marienkirche in Zwickau, Schumann seems to have started developing a deeper interest in Bach's organ music in 1832. In his diary he recorded sightreading the six organ fugues BWV 543–548 for four hands with Clara Wieck, the twelve-year-old daughter of his Leipzig piano teacher Friedrich Wieck and his future wife. Schumann later acknowledged Bach as the composer who had influenced him most. In addition to collecting his works, Schumann started with Friedrich Wieck a new fortnightly music magazine, the Neue Zeitschrift für Musik, in which he promoted the music of Bach as well as that of contemporary composers, such as Chopin and Liszt. One of the main contributors was his friend Carl Becker, organist at the Peterskirche and in 1837 the Nikolaikirche. Schumann remained as editor-in-chief until 1843, the year in which Mendelssohn became the founding director of the Leipzig Conservatory. Schumann was appointed professor for piano and composition at the conservatory; other appointments included Moritz Hauptmann (harmony and counterpoint), Ferdinand David (violin) and Becker (organ and music theory).

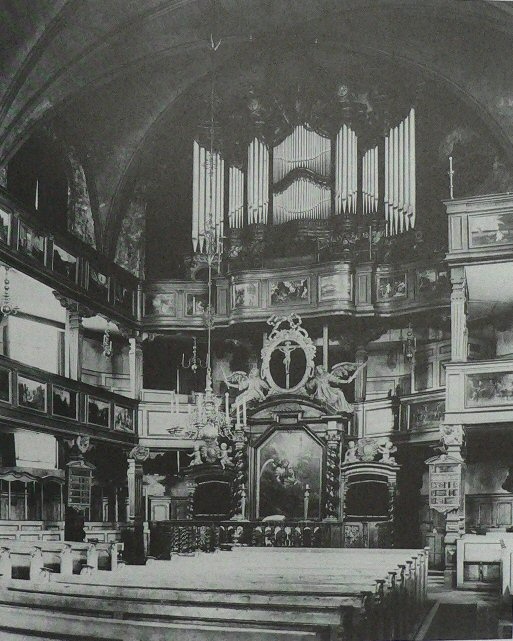
Organ in the Katharinenkirche, Frankfurt in 1900

One of Mendelssohn's regrets since 1822 was that he had not had sufficient opportunity to develop his pedal technique to his satisfaction, despite having given public organ recitals. Mendelssohn explained later how difficult gaining access to organs had already been back in Berlin: "If only people knew how I had to plead and pay and cajole the organists in Berlin, just to be allowed to play the organ for one hour—and how ten times during such an hour I had to stop for this or that reason, then they would certainly speak differently." Elsewhere, on his travels, he had only sporadic opportunities to practice, but not often on pedalboards matching the standard of those in northern Germany, especially in England. The English organist Edward Holmes commented in 1835 that Mendelssohn's recitals in St Paul's Cathedral "gave a taste of his quality which in extemperaneous performance is certainly of the highest kind ... he has not we believe kept up that constant mechanical exercise of the instrument which is necessary to execute elaborate written works." In 1837, despite having performed the St Anne prelude and fugue in England to great acclaim, on his return to Germany Mendelssohn still felt dissatisfied, writing that, "This time I have resolved to practice the organ her in earnest; after all, if everyone takes me for an organist, I am determined, after the fact, to become one." It was only in the summer of 1839 that an opportunity arose when he spent six weeks on holiday in Frankfurt. There he had daily access to the pedal piano of his wife Cécile's cousin Friedrich Schlemmer and, probably through him, access to the organ in the Katharinenkirche built in 1779–1780 by Franz and Philipp Stumm.

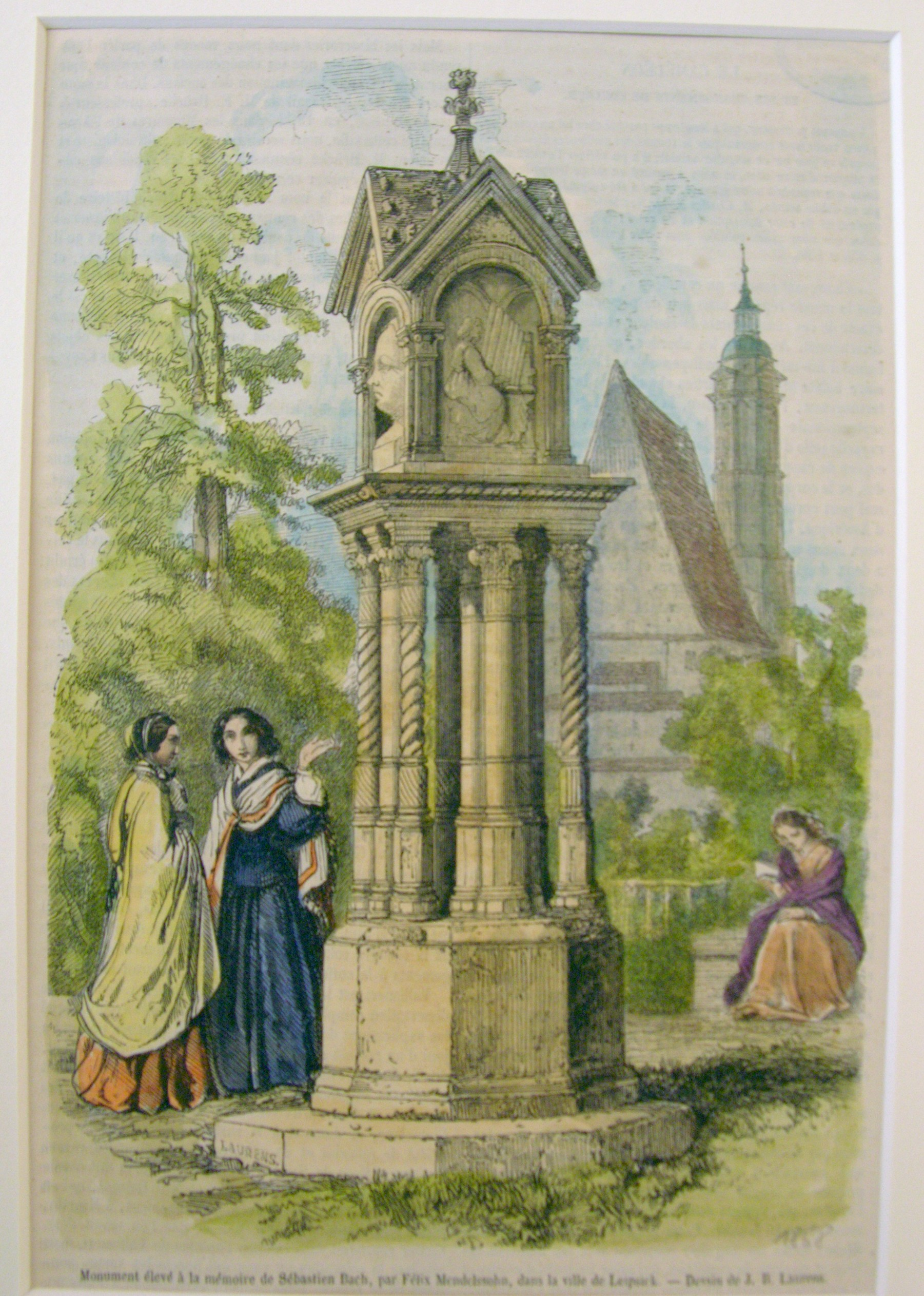
Eduard Holzstich, 1850: watercolour of the Bach Memorial (1843) in front of the Thomaskirche

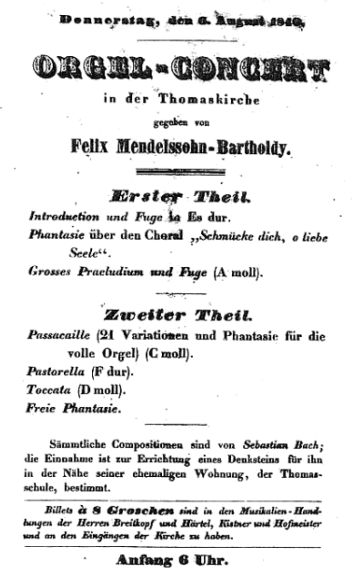
Programme for Mendelssohn's concert in the Thomaskirche In August 1840

August 1840 saw the fruits of Mendelssohn's labour: his first organ recital in the Thomaskirche. The proceeds from the concert were to go towards a statue of Bach in the vicinity of the Thomaskirche. Most of the repertoire in the concert had been played by Mendelssohn elsewhere, but nevertheless as he wrote to his mother, "I practised so much the previous eight days that I could barely stand on my own two feet and walked along the street in nothing but organ passages." The concert was wholly devoted to Bach's music, except for an improvised "free fantasy" at the end. In the audience was the elderly Friedrich Rochlitz, founding editor of the Allgemeine musikalische Zeitung, a journal that had promoted the music of Bach: Rochlitz is reported to have declared afterwards, "I shall depart now in peace, for never shall I hear anything finer or more sublime." The recital started with the St Anne prelude and fugue BWV 552. The only chorale prelude was Schmücke dich, o liebe Seele BWV 654 from the Great Eighteen Chorale Preludes, a favourite of both Mendelssohn and Schumann. Until that time very few of these or the shorter chorale preludes from the Orgelbüchlein had been published. Mendelssohn prepared an edition of both sets that was published in 1844 by Breitkopf and Härtel in Leipzig and by Coventry and Hollier in London. At about the same time the publishing house of Peters in Leipzig produced an edition of Bach's complete organ works in nine volumes edited by Friedrich Konrad Griepenkerl and Ferdinand Roitzsch. The E flat prelude and fugue BWV 552 appears in Volume III (1845), the chorale preludes BWV 669–682, 684–689 in Volume VI and VII (1847) and BWV 683 in Volume V (1846) with chorale preludes from the Orgelbüchlein.

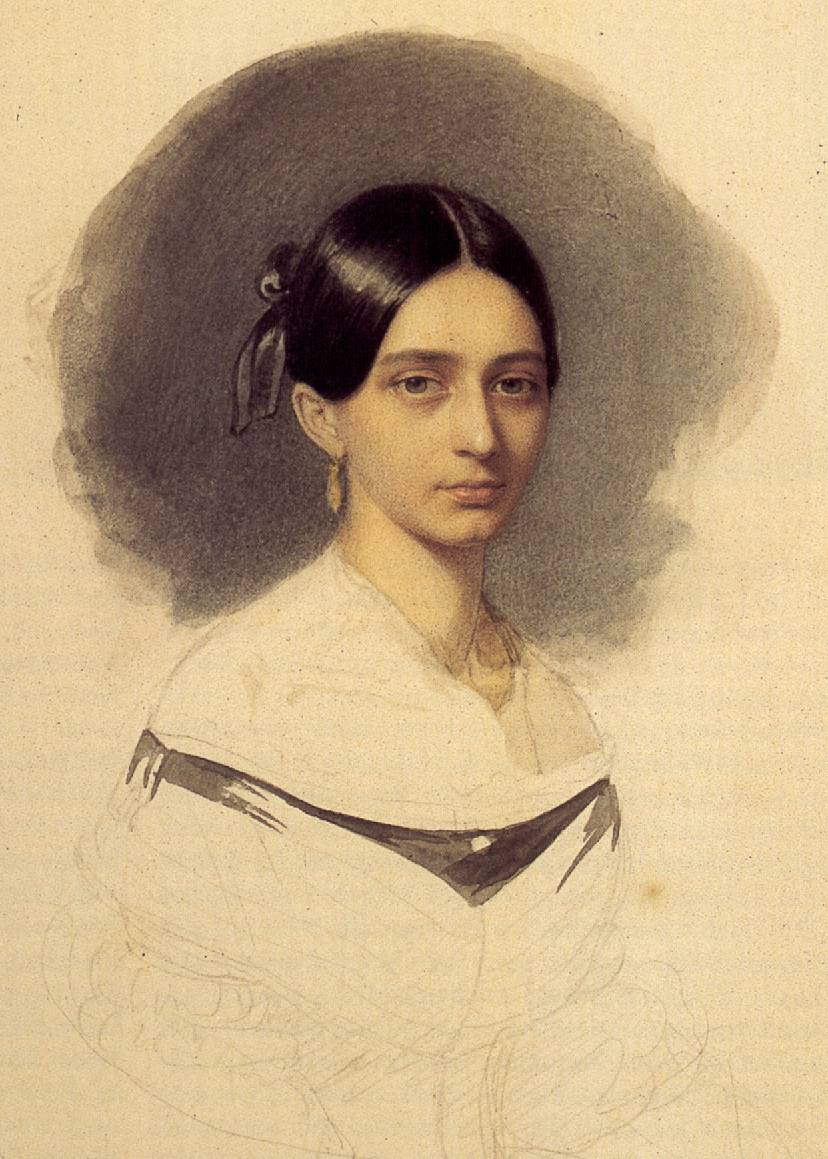
Clara Wieck

In 1845, while Robert was recovering from a nervous breakdown and a few months prior to the completion of his piano concerto, the Schumanns rented a pedalboard to place under their upright piano. As Clara recorded at the time, "On April 24th we got on hire a pedal-board to attach below the pianoforte, and we had great pleasure from it. Our chief object was to practice organ playing. But Robert soon found a higher interest in this instrument and composed some sketches and studies for it which are sure to find high favour as something quite new." The pedalflügel base on which the piano was placed had 29 keys connected to 29 separate hammers and strings encased at the rear of the piano. The pedal board was manufactured by the same Leipzig firm of Louis Schöne that had provided the grand pedal piano in 1843 for the use of students at the Leipzig Conservatory. Before composing any of his own fugues and canons for organ and pedal piano, Schumann had made a careful study of Bach's organ works, of which he had an extensive collection. Clara Schumann's Bach book, an anthology of organ works by Bach, now in the archives of the Riemenschneider Bach Institute, contains the whole of Clavier-Übung III, with detailed analytic markings by Robert Schumann. On the centenary of Bach's death in 1850, Schumann, Becker, Hauptmann and Otto Jahn founded the Bach Gesellschaft, an institution dedicated to publishing, without any editorial additions, the complete works of Bach through the publishers Breitkopf and Härtel. The project was completed in 1900. The third volume, devoted to keyboard works, contained the Inventions and Sinfonias and the four parts of the Clavier-Übung. It was published in 1853, with Becker as editor.

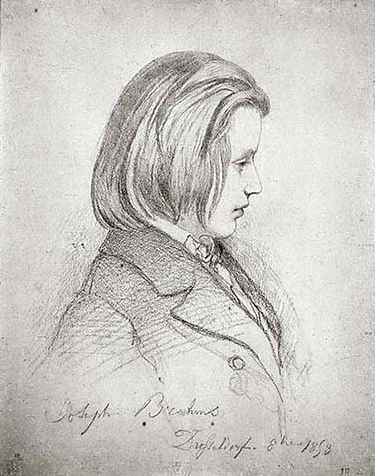
Johannes Brahms at the age of 20 in a drawing made in 1853 at Schumann's home in Düsseldorf by the French organist-artist Jean-Joseph Bonaventure Laurens

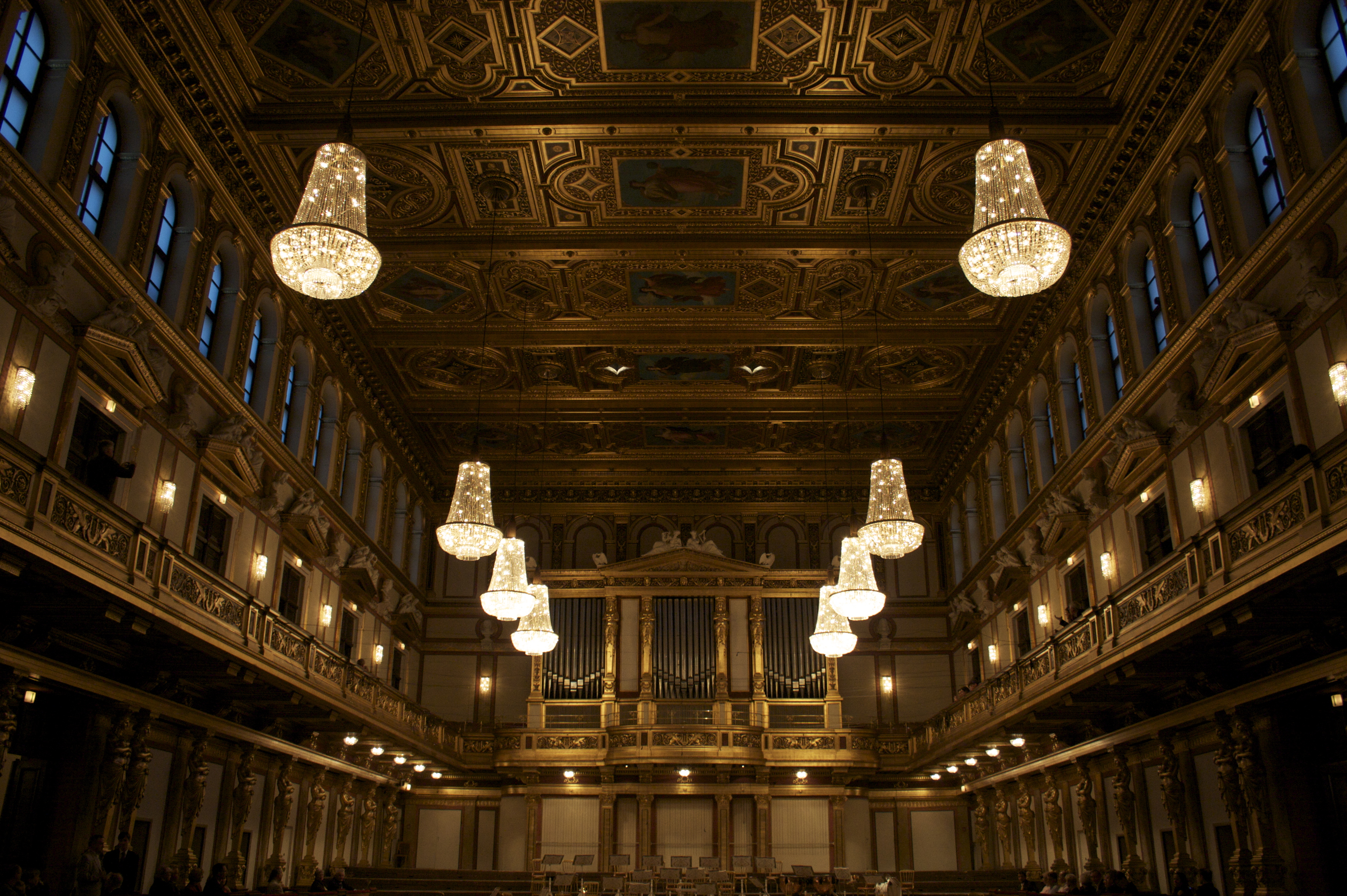
Musikverein in Vienna

At the end of September 1853, having been recommended by the violinist and composer Joseph Joachim, the twenty-year-old Johannes Brahms appeared on the doorstep of the Schumann's home in Düsseldorf, staying with them until early November. Like Schumann, perhaps even more so, Brahms was deeply influenced by Bach's music. Shortly after his arrival he gave a performance on the piano of Bach's organ toccata in F BWV 540/1 in the house of Joseph Euler, a friend of Schumann. Three months after Brahms' visit, Schumann's mental state deteriorated: after a suicide attempt, Schumann committed himself to the sanitorium in Endenich near Bonn, where, after several visits from Brahms, he died in 1856. From its inception, Brahms subscribed to the Bach-Gesellschaft, of which he became an editor in 1881. An organist himself and a scholar of early and baroque music, he carefully annotated and analysed his copies of the organ works; he made a separate study of Bach's use of parallel fifths and octaves in his organ counterpoint. Brahms' Bach collection is now preserved in the Gesellschaft der Musikfreunde in Vienna, of which he became musical director and conductor in 1872. In 1875, he conducted a performance in the Musikverein of an orchestral arrangement by Bernhard Scholz of the prelude in E flat BWV 552/1. In 1896, a year before he died, Brahms composed his own set of eleven chorale preludes for organ, Op.122. Like Schumann, who turned to Bach counterpoint as a form of therapy in 1845 during his recovery from mental illness, Brahms also viewed Bach's music as salutory during his final illness. As Brahms' friend and biographer Max Kalbeck reported:

He complained about his situation and said 'It's lasting so long.' He also told me that he was not able to listen to any music. The piano remained closed: he could only read Bach, that was all. He pointed to the piano, where on the music stand, which stood on top of the closed cover, lay a score of Bach.

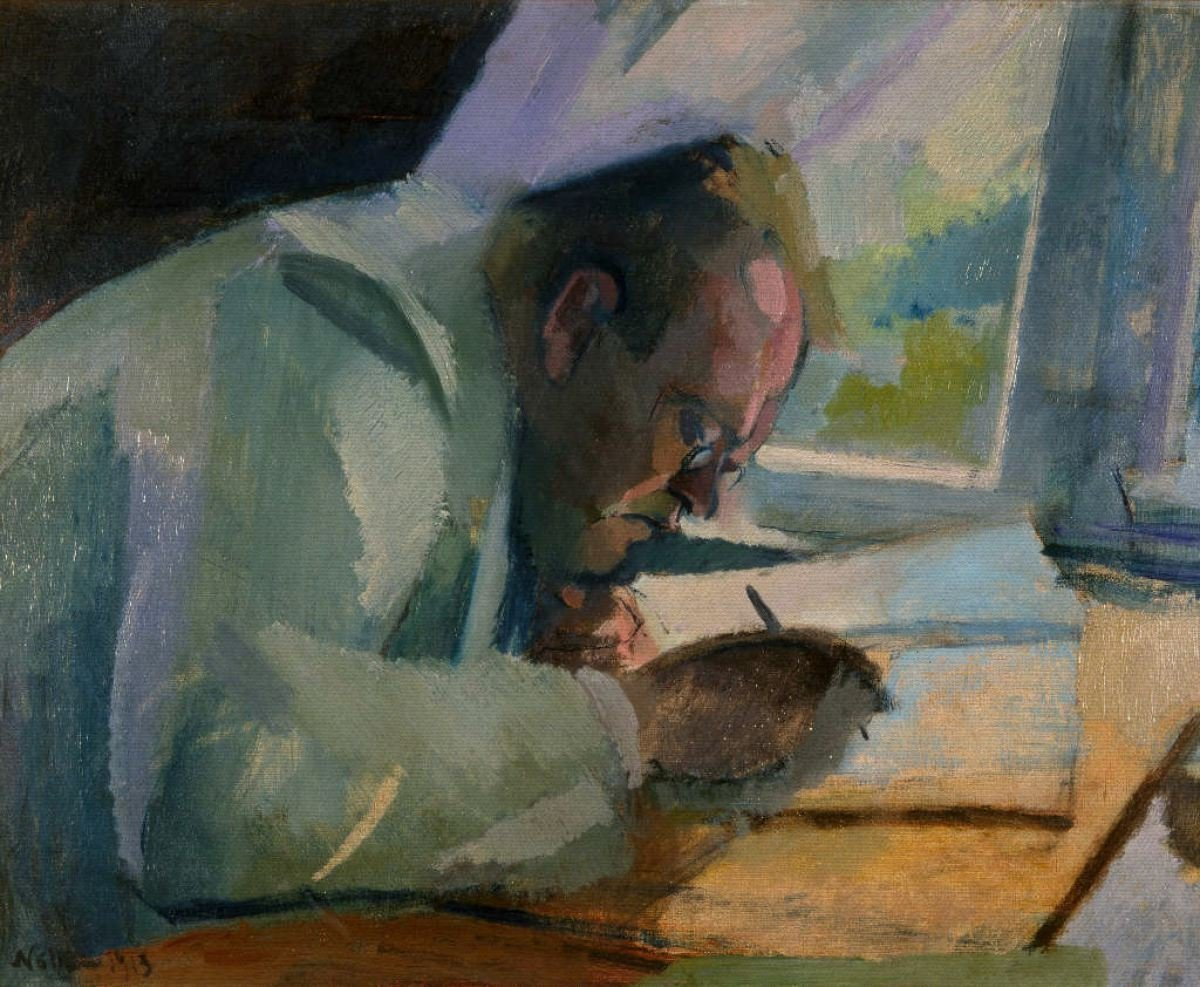
Max Reger

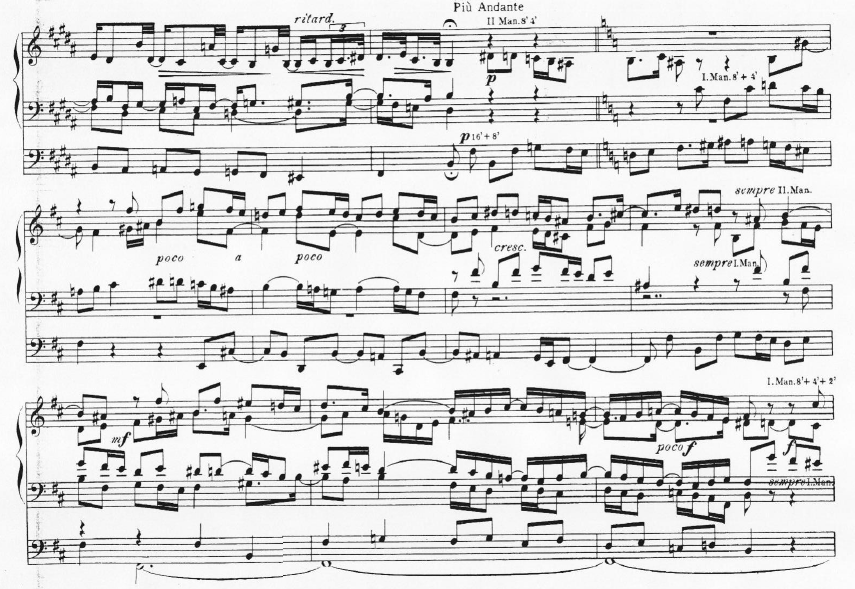
Central section of the adagio from Reger's first suite for organ, Op. 16 (1896)

Max Reger was a composer whose dedication to Bach has been described as a "monomaniacal identification" by the musicologist Johannes Lorenzen: in letters he frequently referred to "Allvater Bach". During his life, Reger arranged or edited 428 of Bach's compositions, including arrangements of 38 organ works for piano solo, piano duet or two pianos, starting in 1895. At the same time he produced a large number of his own organ works. Already in 1894, the organist and musicologist Heinrich Reimann, reacting to modernist trends in German music, had encouraged a return to the style of Bach, stating that, "Beyond this style there is no salvation ... Bach becomes for that reason the criterion of our art of writing for the organ." In 1894–1895 Reger composed his first suite for organ in E minor which was published in 1896 as his Op.16 with a dedication "To the Memory of Johann Sebastian Bach". The original intention was a sonata in three movements: an introduction and triple fugue; an adagio on the chorale Es ist das Heil uns kommen her; and a passacaglia. In the final version, Reger inserted an intermezzo (a scherzo and trio) as the third movement and expanded the adagio to contain a central section on the Lutheran hymns Aus tiefer Not and O Haupt voll Blut und Bunden. In 1896, Reger sent a copy of the suite to Brahms, his only contact. In the letter he asked permission to dedicate a future work to Brahms, to which he received the reply, "Permission for that is certainly not necessary, however! I had to smile, since you approach me about this matter and at the same time enclose a work whose all-too-bold dedication terrifies me!" The overall form of the suite follows the scheme of the eighth organ sonata Op.132 (1882) of Joseph Rheinberger and the symphonies of Brahms. The final passacaglia was a conscious reference to Bach's organ passacaglia in C minor BWV 582/1, but has clear affinities with the last movements of both Rheinberger's sonata and Brahms' fourth symphony. The second movement is an adagio in ternary form, with the beginning of the central section directly inspired by the setting of Aus tiefer Not in the pedaliter chorale prelude BWV 686 of Clavier-Übung III, paying homage to Bach as a composer of instrumental counterpoint. It has a similarly dense texture of six parts, two of them in the pedal. The outer sections are directly inspired by the musical form of the chorale prelude O Mensch, bewein dein Sünde groß BWV 622 from the Orgelbüchlein. The suite was first performed in the Trinity Church, Berlin in 1897 by the organist Karl Straube, a student of Reimann. According to a later account by one of Straube's students, Reimann had described the work as "so difficult as to be almost unplayable", which had "provoked Straube's virtuosic ambition, so that he set about mastering the work, which placed him before utterly new technical problems, with unflagging energy." Straube gave two further performances in 1898, in the cathedral at Wesel, where he had recently been appointed organist, and prior to that in Frankfurt, where he met Reger for the first time. In 1902, Straube was appointed organist at the Thomaskirche and in the following year cantor; he became the main proponent and performer of Reger's organ works.

==== England ====
The people who did attend appeared very much delighted, & some of them (especially the Visitors from Norwich) were good Judges, & of course tickled with such a Row as we gave them upon the most magnificent Organ I have yet heard, & I think in which you would agree with me. Your MS. Music Book has been of special Service to us: the triple fugue in E♭ was received with the same kind of Wonder that people express when they see an Air Balloon ascend for the first time: Smith I believe planted two or three Spies to watch the Effects of such Sound upon their Countenance, & consequently Mind.

— Samuel Wesley, 18 July 1815, letter to Vincent Novello reporting on a performance of BWV 552/2 at St Nicholas Church, Great Yarmouth

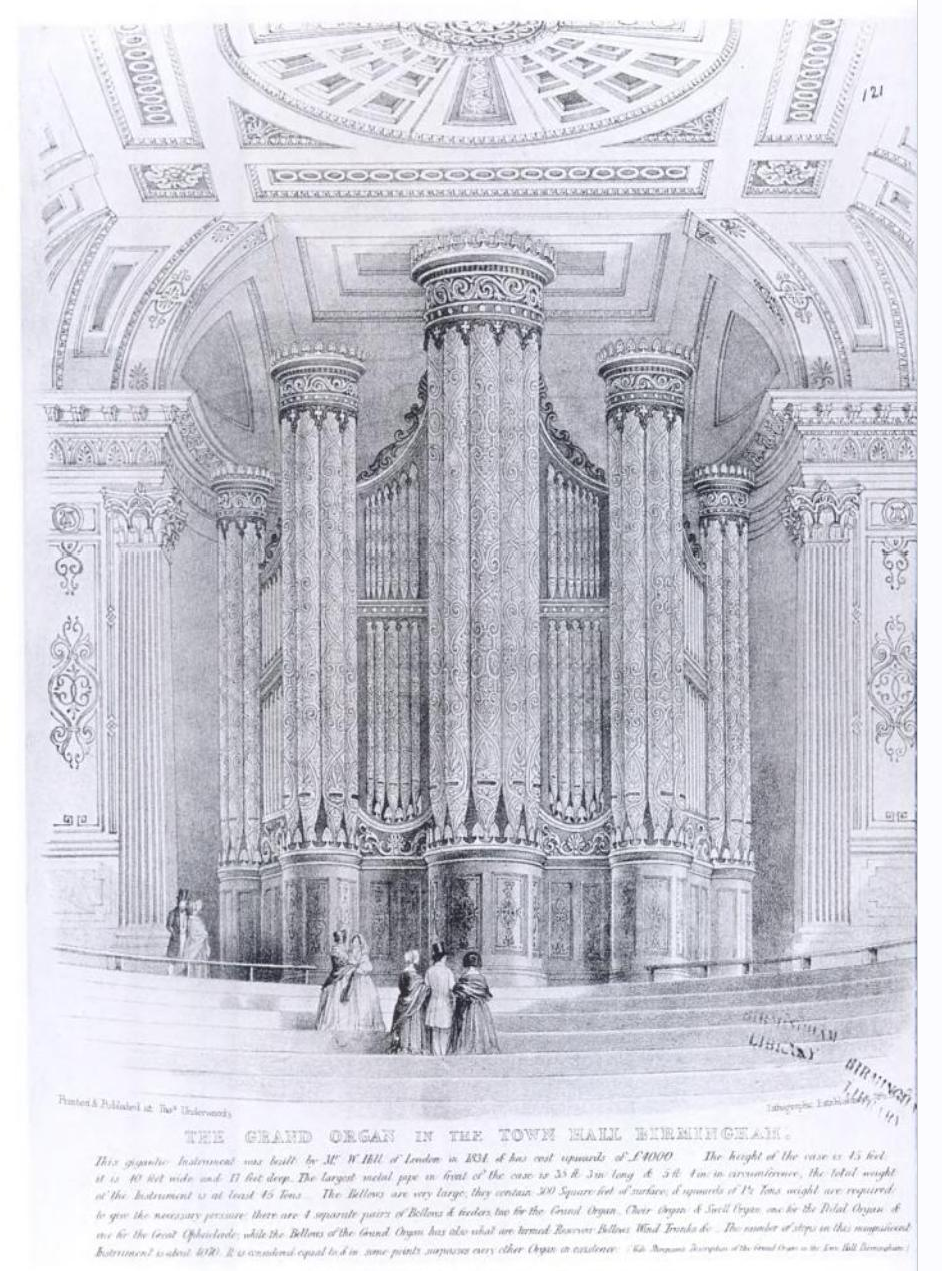
Organ in Birmingham Town Hall constructed in 1834

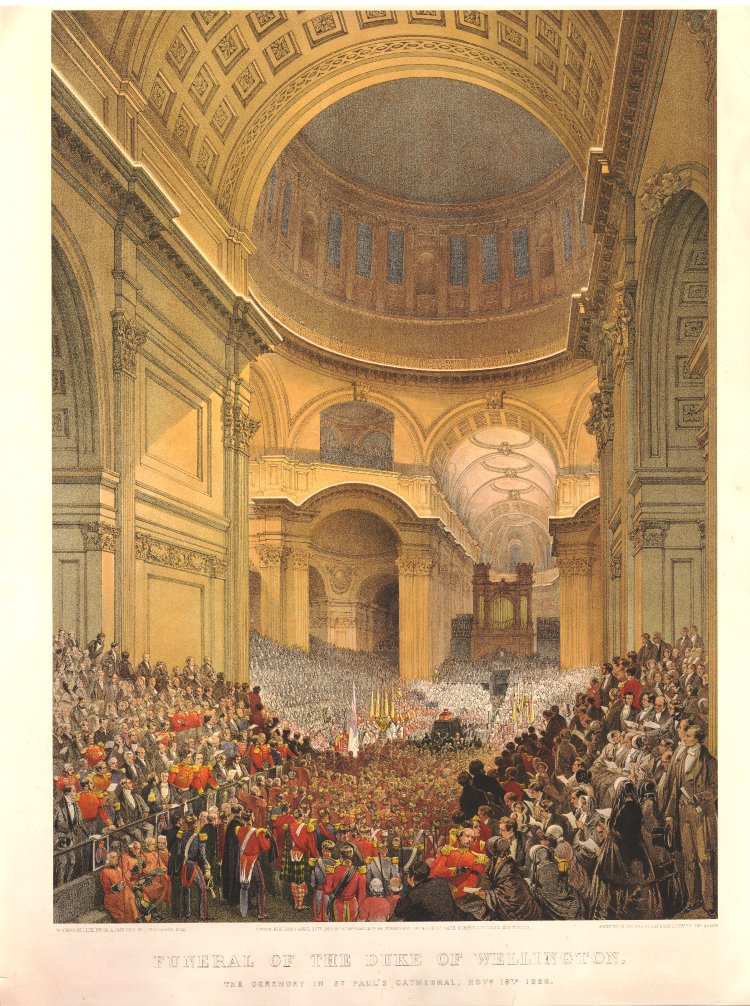
Funeral of the Duke of Wellington in St Paul's Cathedral, 1852, with the Father Smith organ in the background

Apart from prevailing musical tastes and the difficulty in acquiring manuscript copies, a fundamental difference between the design of English and German organs made Bach's organ output less accessible to English organists, namely the absence of pedalboards. Handel's principal works for organ, his organ concertos Op. 4 and Op. 7, with the possible exception of op.7 No.1, all appear to have been written for a single manual chamber organ. Until the 1830s, most church organs in England did not have separate pedal pipes and before that the few organs that had pedalboards were all pull-downs, i.e. pedals that operated pipes connected to the manual stops. Pedalboards rarely contained more than 13 keys (an octave) or exceptionally 17 keys (an octave and a half). Pull-down pedalboards became more common from 1790 onwards. The pedaliter chorale preludes in Clavier-Übung III require a 30-key pedalboard, going from CC to f. It is for this reason that the Bach awakening in England started with clavier compositions being played on the organ or organ compositions being adapted either for piano duet or for two (or sometimes three) players at an organ. The newfound interest in Bach's organ music, as well as the desire to reproduce the grand and thunderous choral effects of the 1784 Handel Commemoration, eventually influenced organ builders in England. By the 1840s, after a series of experiments with pedals and pedal pipes starting around 1800 (in the spirit of the Industrial Revolution), newly constructed and existing organs started to be fitted with dedicated diapason pipes for the pedals, according to the well-established German model. The organ in St Paul's Cathedral commissioned in 1694 from Father Smith and completed in 1697, with a case by Christopher Wren, had exceptionally already been fitted with a 25-key pedalboard (two octaves C-c') of pull-down German pedals in the first half of the 18th century, probably as early as 1720, on the recommendation of Handel. By the 1790s, these had been linked to separate pedal pipes, described with detailed illustrations in Rees's Cyclopædia (1819). The four-manual "monster" organ in Birmingham Town Hall, constructed in 1834 by William Hill, had three sets of pedal pipes connected to the pedalboard, which could also be operated independently by a two-octave keyboard to the left of the manual keyboards. Hill's experiment of installing gigantic 32-foot pedal pipes, some currently still present, was only partially successful, as their scale did not permit them to sound properly.

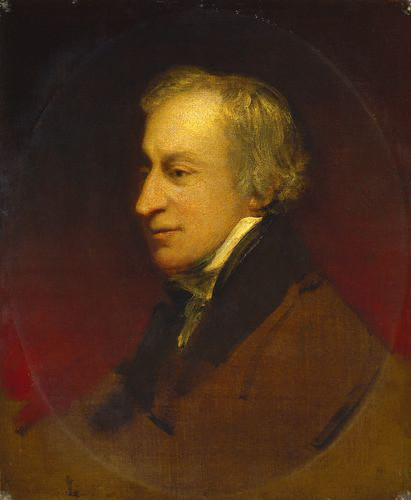
Samuel Wesley

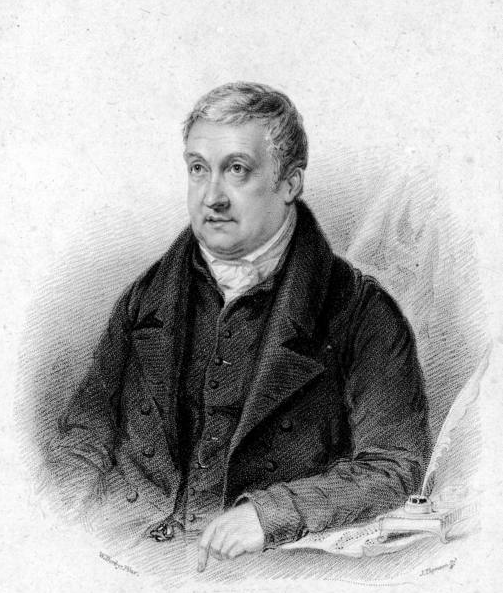
William Crotch

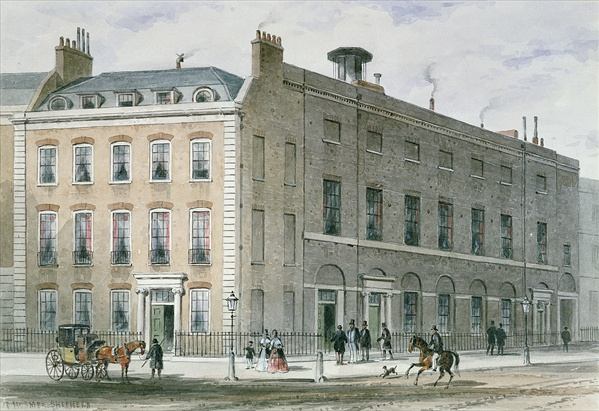
Thomas Hosmer Shepherd, 1830: Hanover Square Rooms

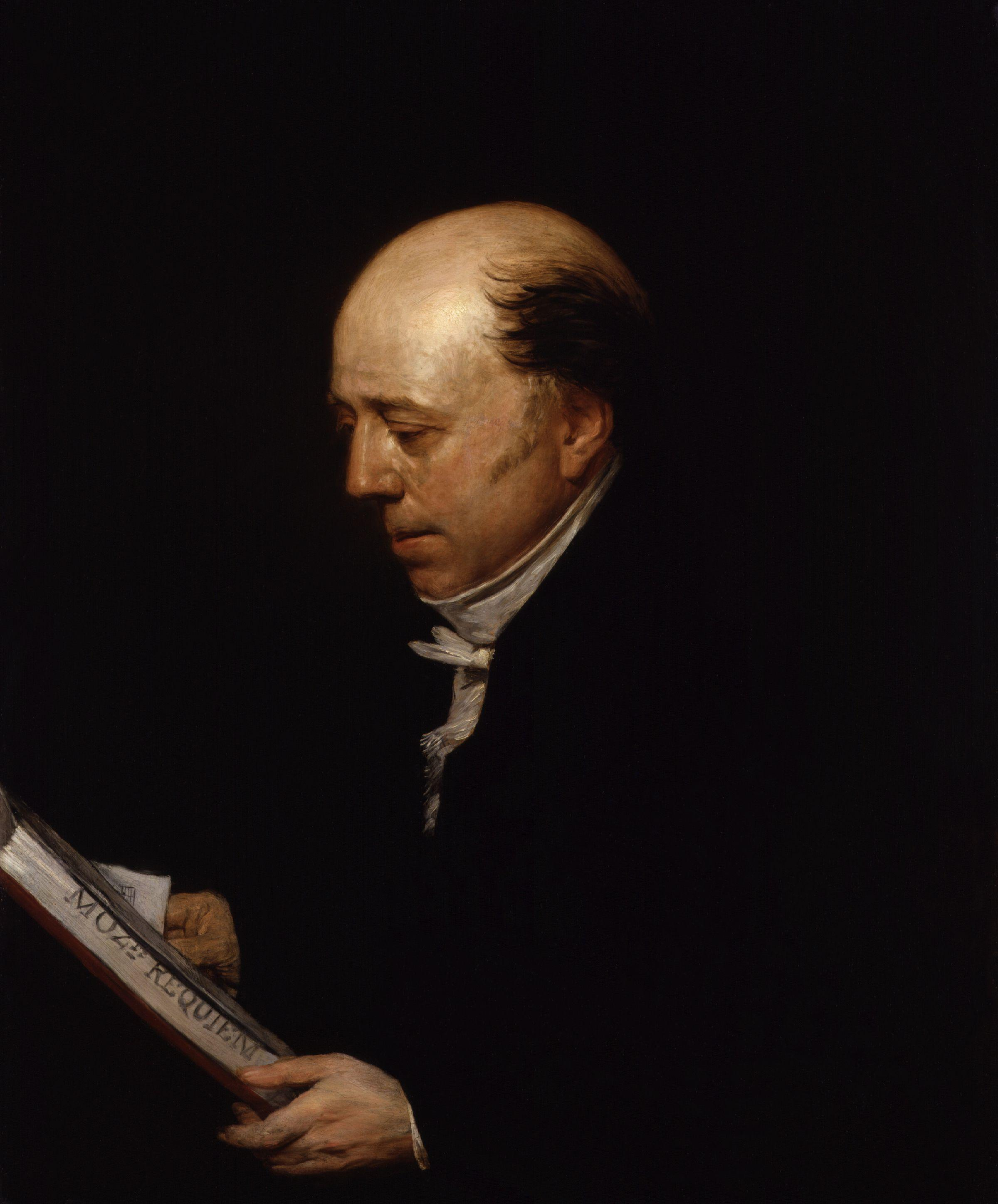
Vincent Novello

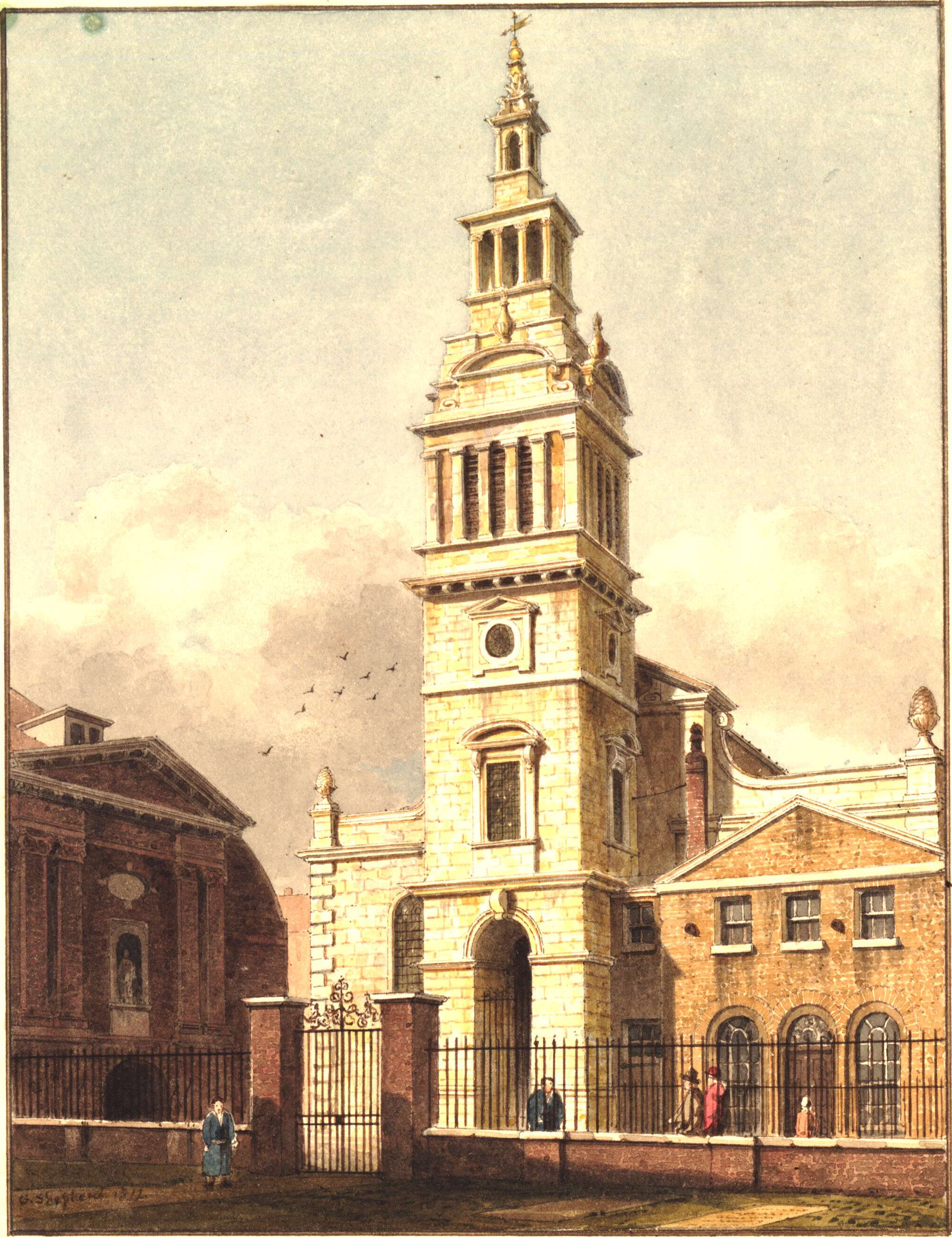
George Shepherd, 1812: Watercolour of Christ Church, Newgate, designed by Christopher Wren

The organist, composer and music teacher Samuel Wesley (1766–1837) played a significant role in awakening interest in Bach's music in England, mostly in the period 1808–1811. After a lull in his own career, in the first half of 1806 he made a hand copy of Nägeli's Zürich edition of The Well-Tempered Clavier. In early 1808 Wesley visited Charles Burney in his rooms in Chelsea where he played for him from the copy of Book I of the '48' that Burney had received from C.P.E. Bach in 1772. As Wesley later recorded, Burney "was very delighted ... and expressed his Wonder how much abstruse Harmony & such perfect & enchanting Melody could have been so marvelously united!" Wesley subsequently consulted Burney, now a convert to the music of Bach, on his project to publish his own corrected transcription, stating, "I believe I can fairly securely affirm that mine is now the most correct copy in England." This project was eventually undertaken in with Charles Frederick Horn, published in four installments between 1810 and 1813. In June 1808 after a concert the Hanover Square Rooms during which Weseley performed some excerpts from the '48', he commented that, "this admirable Musick might be played into Fashion; you see I have only risked one modest Experiment, & it has electrified the Town just in the way that we wanted." Further concerts took place there and in the Surrey Chapel with Benjamin Jacob, a fellow organist with whom Wesley corresponded copiously an effusively about Bach. The musicologist and organist William Crotch, another advocate of Bach, lectured on Bach in 1809 in the Hanover Square Rooms prior to publishing his edition of the E major fugue BWV 878/2 from The Well-Tempered Clavier II. In the introduction, after commenting that Bach fugues were "very difficult of execution, profoundly learned and highly ingenious", he described their "prevailing style" as "the sublime". By 1810, Wesley had stated his intention to perform the E flat fugue BWV 552/2 from Clavier-Übung III in St. Paul's Cathedral. In 1812, in the Hanover Square Rooms he performed an arrangement of the E flat prelude for organ duet and orchestra with the arranger Vincent Novello, founder of the music publishing firm Novello & Co, that would later bring out an English edition of Bach's complete organ works. In 1827, the E flat fugue had been arranged for organ or piano duet by Jacob and was even performed by three players two years later on the organ in St. James, Bermondsey, where the pedal could be played on a supplementary keyboard. It had also been used for auditions for organists: Wesley's son Samuel Sebastian Wesley himself played it in 1827, when seeking employment (unsuccessfully). The chorale preludes from Clavier-Übung III were also performed during this period: in his letters to Benjamin, Wesley mentions in particular Wir glauben BWV 680, which had become known as the "giant fugue", because of the striding figure in the pedal part. By 1837, pedal technique on the organ had developed sufficiently in England that the composer and organist Elizabeth Stirling (1819–1895) could give concerts in St Katherine's, Regent's Park and St. Sepulchre's, Holborn containing several of the pedaliter chorale preludes (BWV 676, 678, 682, 684) as well as the St Anne Prelude BWV 552/1. (These were the first public recitals in England by a female organist; in 1838 she performed BWV 669–670 and the St Anne fugue BWV 552/2 at St Sepulchre's.) In the same year Wesley and his daughter were invited to the organ loft of Christ Church, Newgate for a Bach recital by Felix Mendelssohn. As Mendelssohn recorded in his diary,

Old Wesley, trembling and bent, shook hands with me and at my request sat down at the organ bench to play, a thing he had not done for many years. The frail old man improvised with great artistry and splendid facility, so that I could not but admire. His daughter was so moved by the sight of it all that she fainted and could not stop crying and sobbing.

A week later, Mendelssohn played the St Anne prelude and fugue BWV 552 on the organ in Birmingham Town Hall. Prior to the concert, he confided in a letter to his mother:

Ask Fanny, dear Mother, what she would say if I were to play in Birmingham the Bach organ prelude in E flat major and the fugue that stands at the end of the same volume. I think she will grumble at me, but I think I would be right all the same. The prelude especially would be very acceptable to the English, I would think, and both in the prelude and in the fugue one can show off the piano, pianissimo, and the whole range of the organ—and it is not a dull piece either in my view!

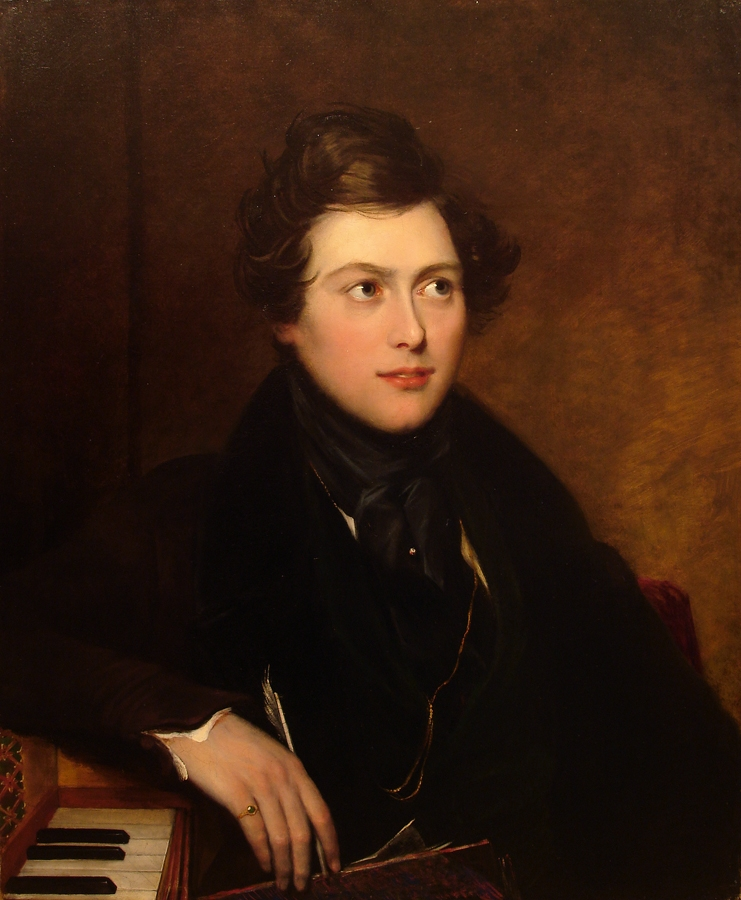
W. Sterndale Bennett

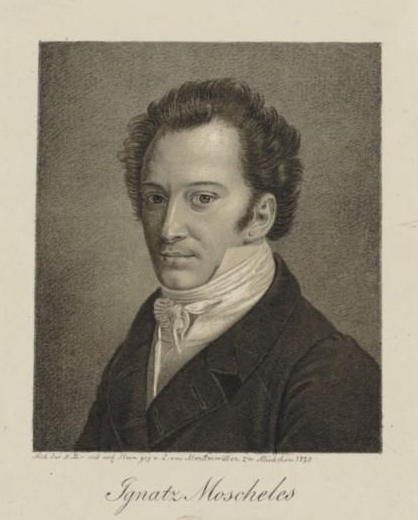
Ignaz Moscheles

Wesley died the following month. Mendelssohn made a total of 10 visits to Britain, the first in 1829, the last in 1847. His first visit, when he stayed with his friend the pianist and composer Ignaz Moscheles, had been a resounding success and Mendelssohn had been embraced by all strata of British musical society. On his fourth trip to Britain in 1833 he was accompanied by his father and heard the seventeen-year-old pianist-composer William Sterndale Bennett performing his first piano concerto. A musical prodigy like Mendelssohn, at the age of 10 Sterndale Bennett had entered the Royal Academy of Music, where he had been taught by Crotch. He was also an accomplished organist, familiar with the works of Bach. (After brief appointments as organist, he subsequently practised on the organ in Hanover Square Rooms, later surprising his son with his mastery of the harder pedal passages on a pedal-piano.) Mendelssohn immediately invited him to Germany. Reportedly when Sterndale Bennett asked to go as his student, Mendelssohn replied, "No, no, you must come to be my friend." Sterndale Bennett eventually visited Leipzig for 6 months from October 1836 to June 1837. There he made friends with Schumann, who became his soul mate and drinking partner. Sterndale Bennett made only two further trips to Germany during the lifetimes of Mendelssohn and Schumann, in 1838–1839 and 1842, although he retained their friendship and helped arrange Mendelssohn's visits to Britain. He became a firm proponent of Bach, organising concerts of his chamber music in London. He was one of the founders in 1849 of the original Bach Society in London, devoted to the performance and collection of Bach's works, principally choral. In 1854, he staged the first performance in England of the St. Matthew Passion in the Hanover Square Rooms.

Already in 1829, Mendelssohn had become friends with Thomas Attwood, who had studied with Mozart and since 1796 had been organist of St Paul's Cathedral. Through Attwood Mendelssohn gained access to the organ at St Paul's, which was suitable for Bach, despite the unusual alignment of the pedalboard. In 1837, however, during a recital at St Paul's, just before playing to Wesley, the air supply to the organ had suddenly been interrupted; in a later account, that he had to retell annoyingly often, Mendelssohn related that George Cooper, the sub-organist,

ran off like a madman, quite red with anger, was a way a little while, and finally returned with the news that during the performance the organ-blower—on the instructions from the beadle, who had not been able to get people to leave the church and was forced to stay on longer against his will—had left the bellows, locked the door to them and left ... Shame! Shame! was called out from all sides. Three or four clerics appeared and tore into the beadle furiously in front of all the people, threatening him with dismissal.

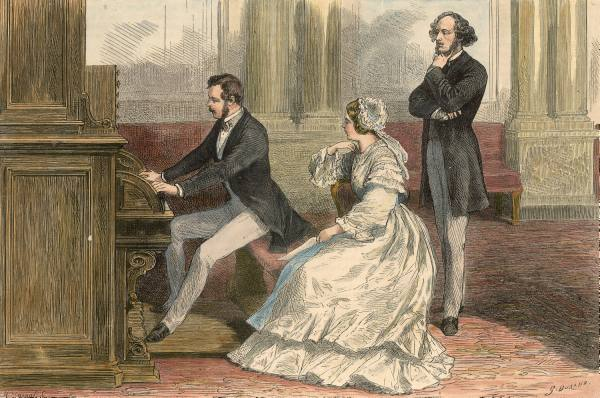
G. Durand, 1842: engraving of Prince Albert playing the organ in the Old Library in Buckingham Palace in the presence of Queen Victoria and Felix Mendelssohn

Cooper's son, also called George, became the next sub-organist at St Paul's. He promoted the organ music of Bach and in 1845 produced the first English edition of the chorale prelude Wir glauben BWV 680 from Clavier-Übung III, published by Hollier & Addison, which he dubbed the "Giant Fugue" because of its striding pedal part. In the second half of the 19th century, this became the best-known of all the pedaliter chorale preludes from Clavier-Übung III and was republished separately several times by Novello in organ anthologies at an intermediate level.

Mendelssohn's eighth visit occurred in 1842 after the accession of Queen Victoria to the throne. Her husband Prince Albert was a keen organist and, under his influence, the music of Bach started to be performed at royal concerts. On the second of his two invitations to Buckingham Palace, Mendelssohn improvised on Albert's organ and accompanied the queen in two songs by Fanny and himself. Between these two visits, he once more performed the St Anne prelude and fugue, this time before an audience of 3,000 in Exeter Hall in a concert organized by the Sacred Harmonic Society. In London there were few church organs with German pedal boards going down to CC: those which did included St. Paul's Cathedral, Christ Church, Newgate and St. Peter's, Cornhill, where Mendelssohn frequently performed solo recitals. During his last visit in 1847, he once more entertained Victoria and Albert in Buckingham Palace in May before playing a few days later the prelude and fugue on the name of "BACH" BWV 898 on the barely functional organ in Hanover Square Rooms during one of the Ancient Concerts organized by Prince Albert, with William Gladstone in the audience.

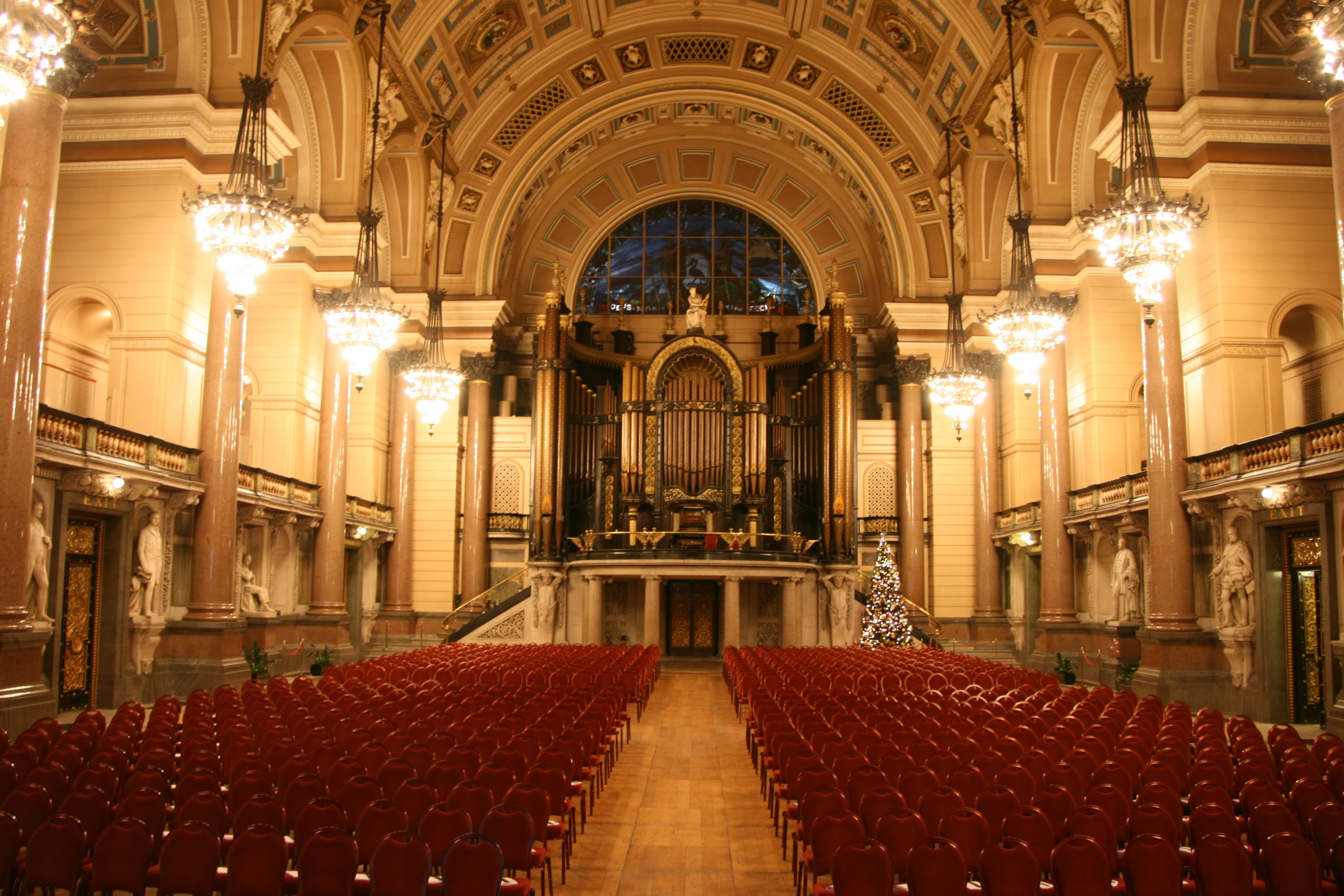
St. George's Hall, Liverpool, with organ built by Henry Willis in 1855

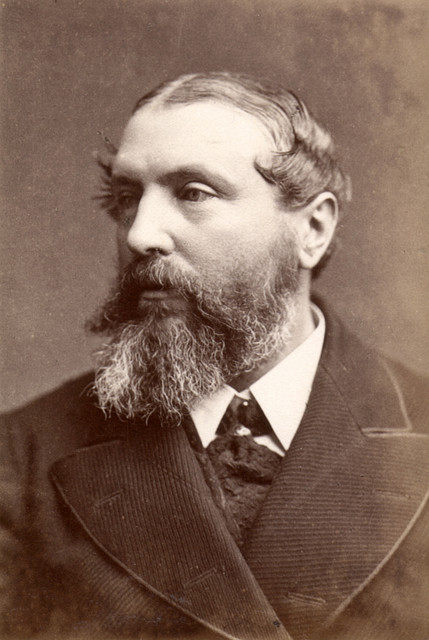
William Thomas Best (1826–1897)

In the late 1840s and early 1850s, organ building in England became more stable and less experimental, taking stock of traditions in Germany and innovations in France, particularly from the new generation of organ builders such as Aristide Cavaillé-Coll. One of the main names in organ building in England in the second half of the 19th century was Henry Willis. The manner in which the organ for St. George's Hall, Liverpool was planned and constructed marks the transition from what Nicholas Thistlethwaite calls the "insular movement" of the 1840s to the adoption of the established German system. Planning formally started on the organ in 1845: the main advisor to Liverpool Corporation was Samuel Sebastian Wesley, son of Samuel Wesley and an accomplished organist, particularly of Bach. He worked in consultation with a panel of university professors of music, who often disagreed with his eccentric suggestions. When Wesley tried to argue about the range of manual keyboards, justifying himself by the possibility of playing octaves with the left hand, he was reminded by the professors that the use of octaves was more common among pianists than first-rate organists and moreover that when he had been organist at Leeds Parish Church, "the dust on the half-dozen lowest keys on the GG manuals remained undisturbed for months." Willis was commissioned to build the organ only in 1851, after he had impressed the committee with the organ for Winchester Cathedral he had on display at The Crystal Palace during the Great Exhibition. The completed organ had four manual keyboards and a thirty key pedalboard, with 17 sets of pedal pipes and a range from CC to f. The instrument had unequal temperament and, as Wesley had stipulated, the air supply came from two large underground bellows powered by an eight horse-power steam engine. Among the innovations introduced by Willis were the cylindrical pedal-valve, the pneumatic lever and the combination action, the latter two features being adopted widely by English organ builders in the second half of the 19th century. The organ was inaugurated in 1855 by William Thomas Best, who later that year was appointed resident organist, attracting crowds of thousands to hear his playing. In 1867, he had the organ retuned to equal temperament. He remained in his post until 1894, giving performances elsewhere in England, including at the Crystal Palace, St James's Hall and the Royal Albert Hall. The St Anne prelude and fugue BWV 552 was used by Best to start off the series of Popular Monday Concerts at St James's Hall in 1859; and later in 1871 to inaugurate the newly built Willis organ in the Royal Albert Hall, in the presence of Queen Victoria.

==== France ====
One day I was passing by the small rooms on the first floor of the Maison Érard, reserved only for great pianists, for their practice and lessons. At the time the rooms were all empty, except one, from which could be heard the great Triple-Prelude in E flat by Bach played remarkably well on a pedalier. I listened, riveted to the spot by the expressive, crystal-clear playing of a little old man, frail in appearance, who, without seeming to suspect my presence, continued the piece right to the end. Then, turning to me: 'Do you know this music?' he asked. I replied that, as an organ pupil in Franck's class at the Conservatoire, I could scarcely ignore such a fine work. 'Play me something' he added, giving up the piano stool for me. Although somewhat over-awed, I managed to play quite cleanly the C Major Fugue ... Without comment he returned to the piano saying 'I am Charles-Valentin Alkan and I'm just preparing for my annual series of six 'Petits Concerts' at which I play only the finest things'.

— Vincent D'Indy, 1872

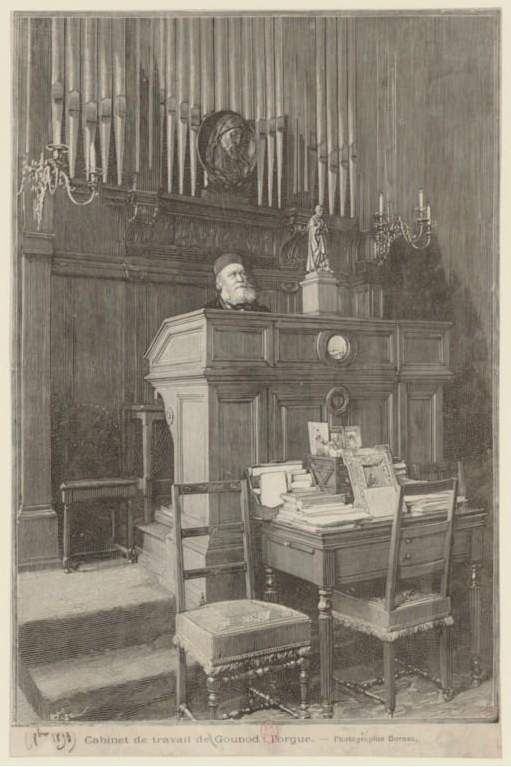
Charles Gounod in his studio in 1893, playing his Cavaillé-Coll organ

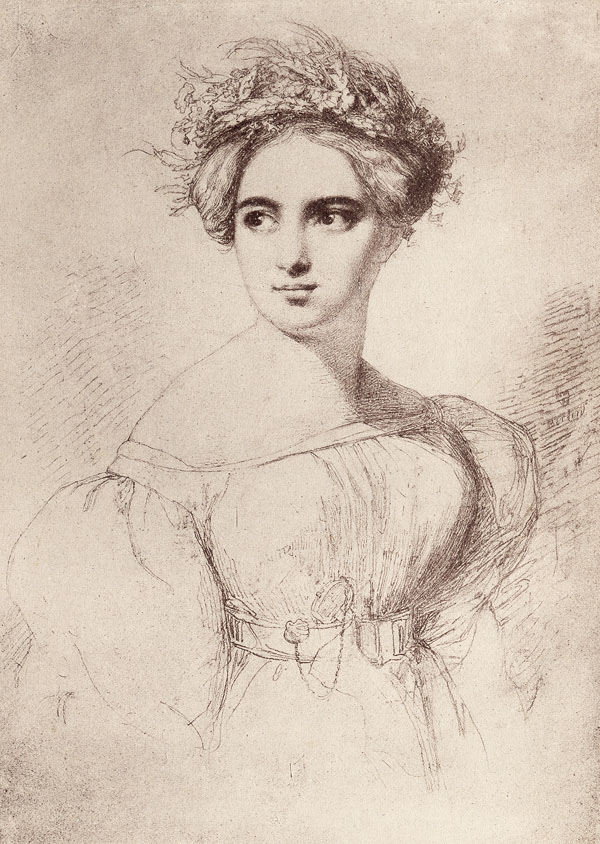
Fanny Mendelssohn in a drawing by her future husband Wilhelm Hensel

In France, the Bach revival was slower to take root. Before the late 1840s, after the upheaval caused by the French Revolution, Bach was rarely performed in public concerts in France and it was preferred that church organists play operatic arias or popular airs instead of counterpoint. One exception was a public performance in the Paris Conservatoire in December 1833, repeated two years later in the Salons Pape, of the opening allegro of Bach's concerto for three harpsichords BWV 1063, played on pianos by Chopin, Liszt and Hiller. Berlioz later described their choice as "stupid and ridiculous", unworthy of their talents. Charles Gounod, having won the Prix de Rome in 1839, spent three years in the Villa Medici in Rome, where he developed a passionate interest in the polyphonic music of Palestrina. He also met Mendelssohn's sister Fanny, herself an accomplished concert pianist and by then married to the artist Wilhelm Hensel: Gounod described her as "an outstanding musician and a woman of superior intelligence, small, slender, but gifted with an energy which showed in her deep-set eyes and in her burning look". In response Fanny noted in her diary that Gounod was "passionately fond of music in a way I have rarely seen before." She introduced Gounod to the music of Bach, playing from memory fugues, concertos and sonatas for him on the piano. At the end of his stay in 1842, the twenty-five-year-old Gounod had become a confirmed Bach devotee. In 1843, after a seven-month stay in Vienna, with a letter of introduction from Fanny, Gounod spent 4 days with her brother in Leipzig. Mendelssohn played Bach for him on the organ of the Thomaskirche and conducted a performance of his Scottish Symphony by the Gewandhaus orchestra, specially convened in his honour. Back in Paris, Gounod took up an appointment as organist and music director in the Église des Missions Étrangères on the rue de Bac, on condition that he would be allowed to have autonomy over the music: Bach and Palestrina figured strongly in his repertoire. When churchgoers initially objected to this daily diet of counterpoint, Gounod was confronted by the Abbé, who eventually yielded to Gounod's conditions, although not without commenting "What a terrible man you are!"

In the late 1840s and 1850s a new school of organist-composers emerged in France, all trained in the organ works of Bach. These included Franck, Saint-Saëns, Fauré and Widor. In the aftermath of the French Revolution, there had already been a revival of interest in France in choral music of the baroque and earlier periods, particularly of Palestrina, Bach and Handel: Alexandre-Étienne Choron founded the Institution royale de musique classique et religieuse in 1817. After the July Revolution and Choron's death in 1834, direction of the institute, renamed the "Conservatoire royal de musique classique de France", was taken over by Louis Niedermeyer and took his name as the École Niedermeyer. Along with the Conservatoire de Paris, it became one of the main training grounds for French organists. The Belgian composer and musicologist François-Joseph Fétis, a contemporary and colleague of Choron in Paris, shared his interest in early and baroque music. Fétis exerted a similar influence in Brussels, where he was appointed director of the Royal Conservatory of Brussels in 1832, a position he held until his death in 1871.

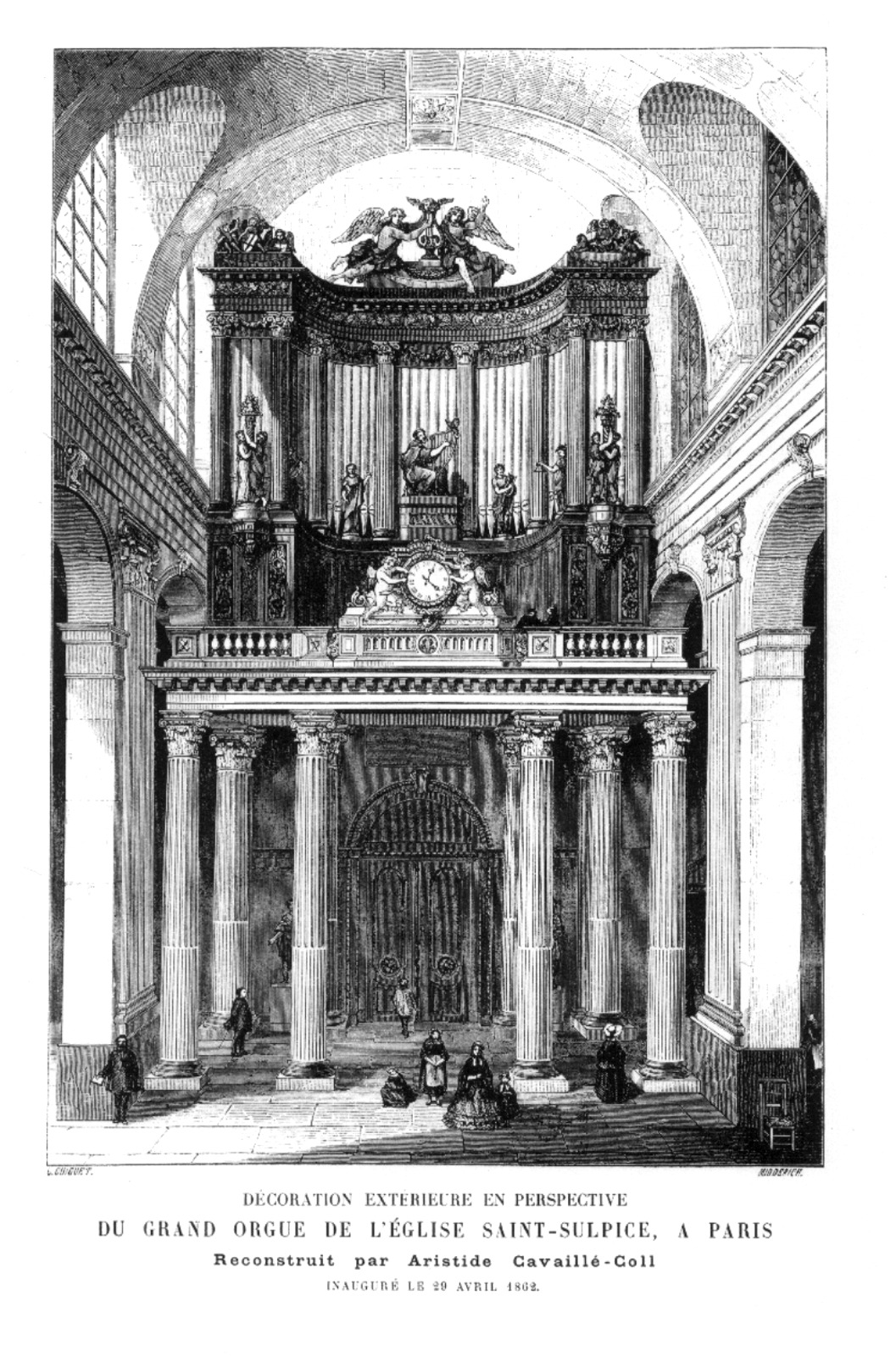
Engraving of the Cavaillé-Coll organ in St. Sulpice, Paris

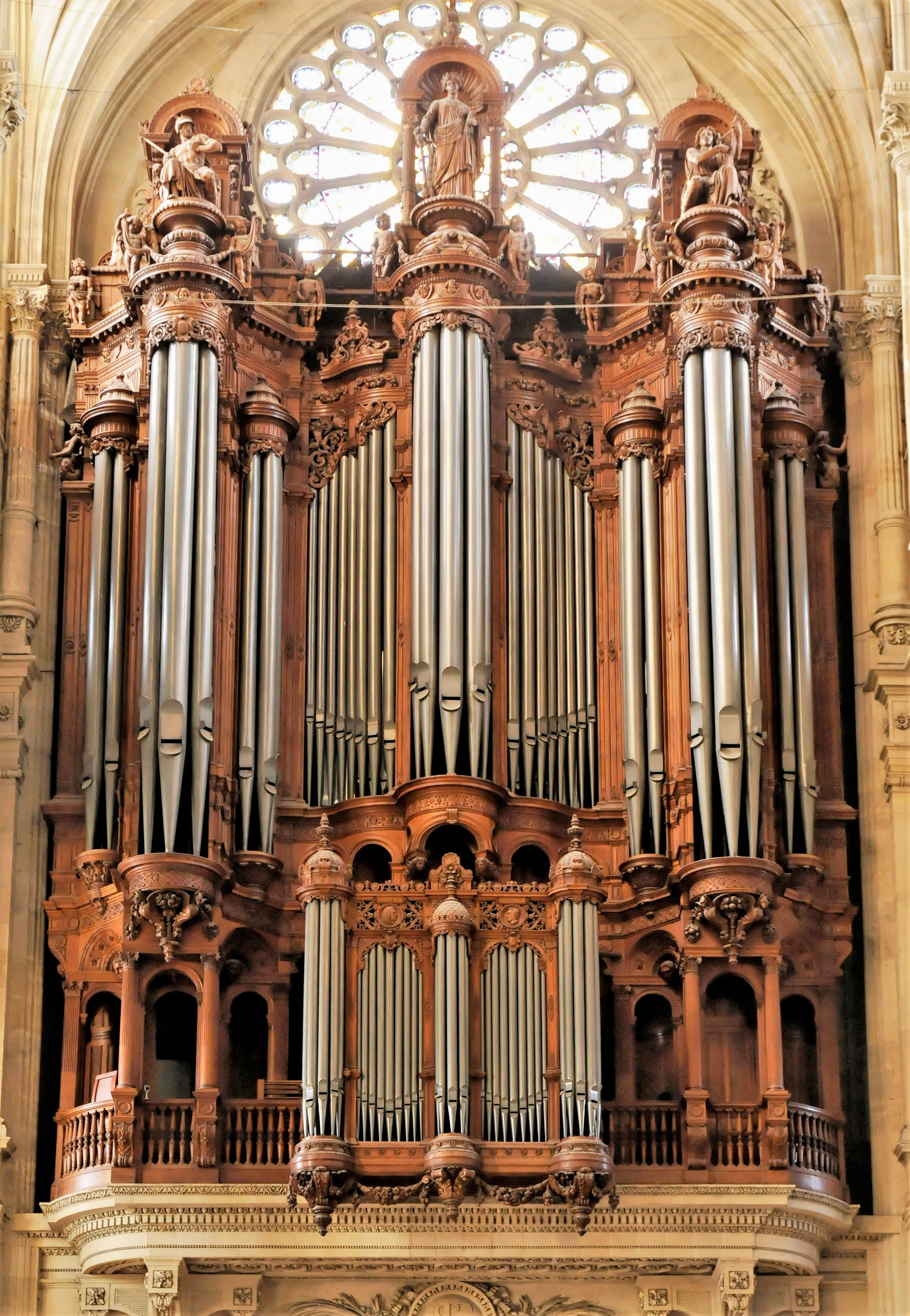
Organ at St Eustache, rebuilt in 1989 in the original case designed by Victor Baltard

At the same time, French organ builders most notably Aristide Cavaillé-Coll were starting to produce new series of organs, which with their pedalboards, were designed both for the music of Bach as well as modern symphonic compositions. The change in traditions can be traced back to the inauguration in 1844 of the organ for St Eustache, built by Doublaine and Callinet. The German organ virtuoso Adolf Friedrich Hesse was invited with five Parisians to demonstrate the new instrument. As part of his recital Hesse played Bach's Toccata in F major, BWV 540/1, allowing the Parisian audience to hear pedal technique far beyond what was known in France at that time. While impressed by his pedal playing, French commentators at the time gave Hesse mixed praise, one remarking that, while he might be the "king of the pedal ... he thinks of nothing but power and noise, his playing astonishes, but does not speak to the soul. He always seems to be the minister of an angry God who wants to punish." Another commentator, however, who had heard Hesse playing Bach on the organ at an industrial exhibition beforehand, noted that "if the organ of the Doublaine-Callinet firm is perfect from bottom to top, Monsieur Hesse is a complete organist from head to feet." The new organ had a short life: it was destroyed by fire from a falling candle in December 1844.

Two Belgian organist-composers, Franck and Jacques-Nicolas Lemmens, participated in the inauguration in 1854 of the new organ at St Eustache. Lemmens had studied with Hesse and Fétis; already in the early 1850s he had started giving public concerts in Paris, featuring Bach's organ music and using the brilliant foot technique he had learnt in Germany. At the same time Lemmens had published 18 installments of an organ manual for the use of "organistes du culte catholique", giving a complete introduction to the Bach tradition of organ playing, henceforth adopted in France.

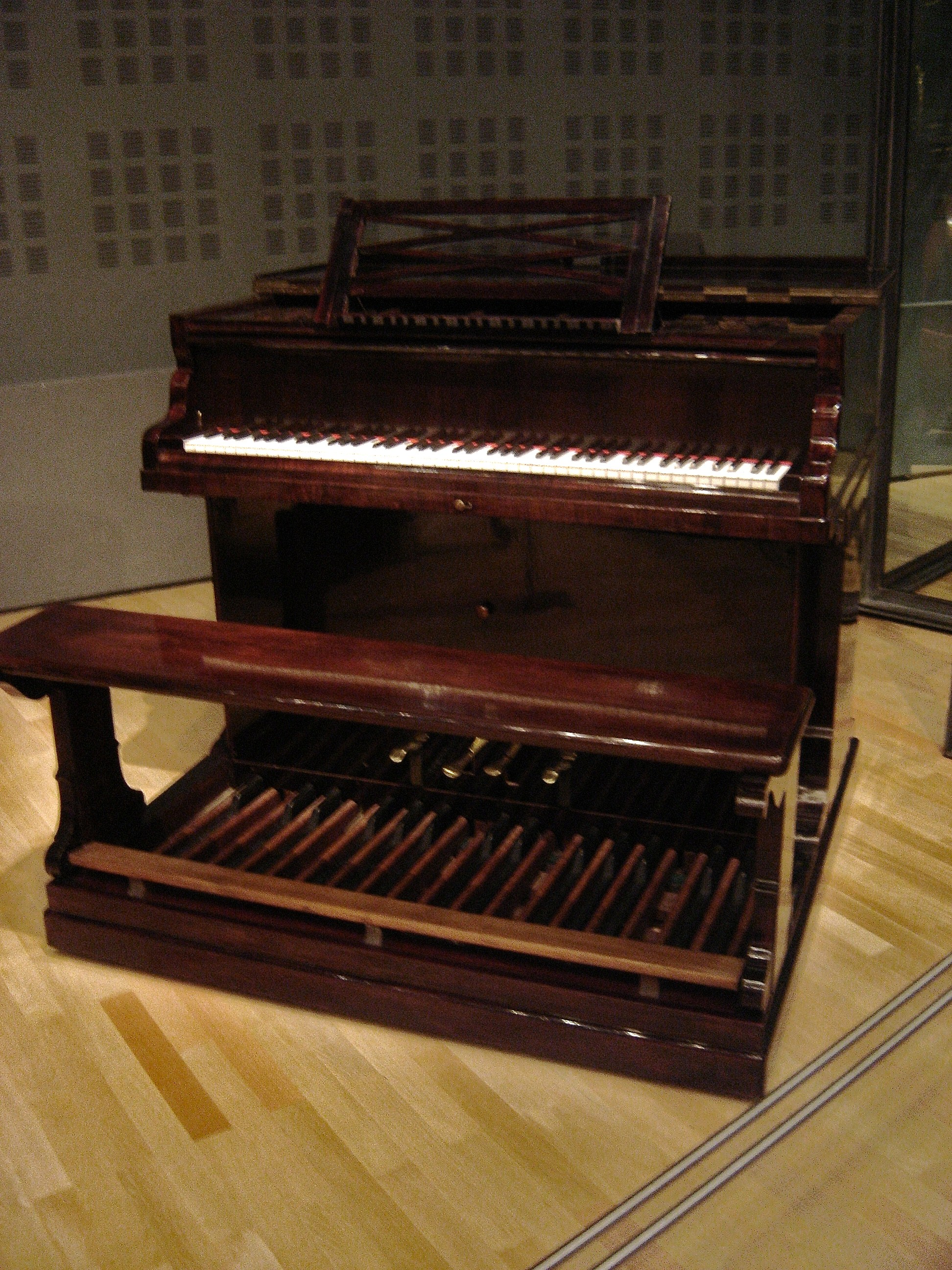
Érard pedal piano

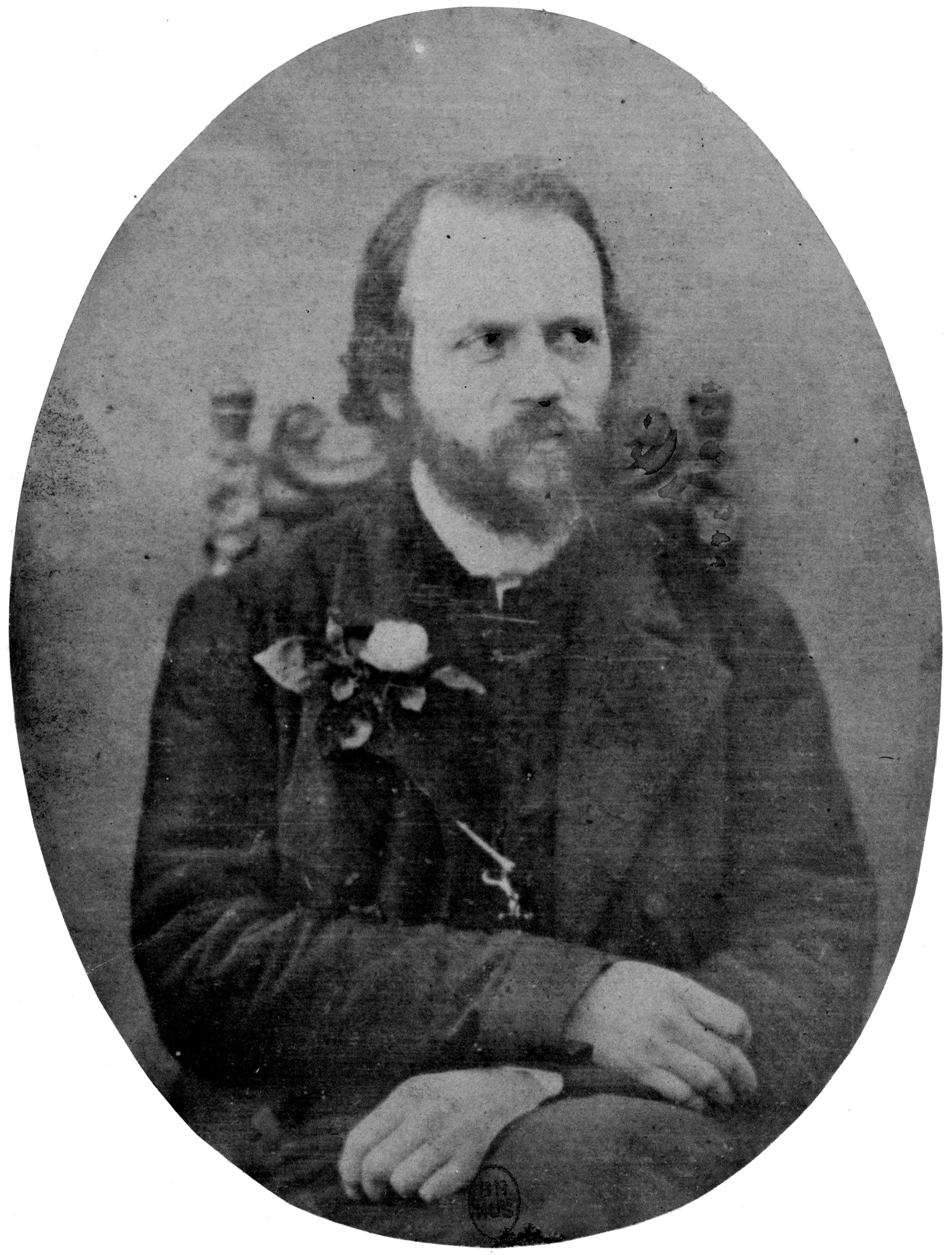
Charles Valentin Alkan

In 1855, the piano firm Érard introduced a new instrument, the pedal piano (pédalier), a grand piano fitted with a full German-style pedalboard. The French composer, organist and virtuoso pianist Charles Valentin Alkan and Lemmens gave concerts on it, including performances of Bach's toccatas, fugues and chorale preludes for organ. In 1858, Franck, a friend of Alkan, acquired a pédalier for his private use. Alkan, a devotee of Bach and one of the first subscribers to the Bach Gesellschaft, composed extensively for the pédalier, including in 1866 a set of twelve studies for pedalboard alone. In the 1870s, Alkan, by that time a recluse, returned to give a series of public Petits Concerts each year in the Salle Érard using their pédalier: Alkan's repertoire included the St Anne prelude as well as several chorale preludes.

There were further indications of changes in taste in France: Saint-Saëns, organist at the Madeleine from 1857 to 1877, refused to perform operatic arias as part of the liturgy, on one occasion replying to such a request, "Monsieur l'Abbé, when I hear from the pulpit the language of the Opéra Comique, I will play light music. Not before!" Saint-Saëns was nevertheless reluctant to use Bach's music in services. He regarded the preludes, fugues, toccatas and variations as virtuosic pieces for concert performance; and the chorale preludes as too Protestant in spirit for inclusion in a Catholic mass. The St Anne prelude and fugue was often used by Saint-Saëns for inaugurating Cavaillé-Coll organs; in Paris; he played for the inaugurations at St Sulpice (1862), Notre Dame (1868), Trinité (1869), the chapel in Versailles (1873) and the Trocadéro (1878).

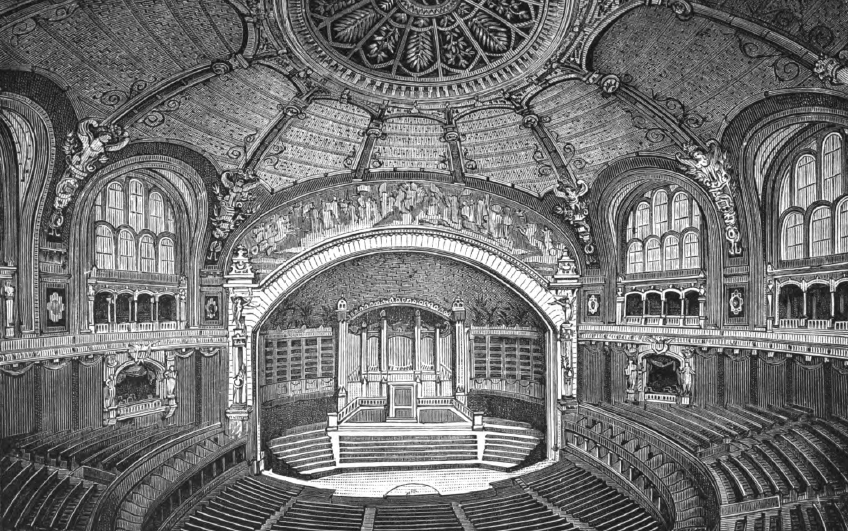
Cavaillé-Colle organ in the Salle des Fêtes of the Palais du Trocadéro, built in 1878

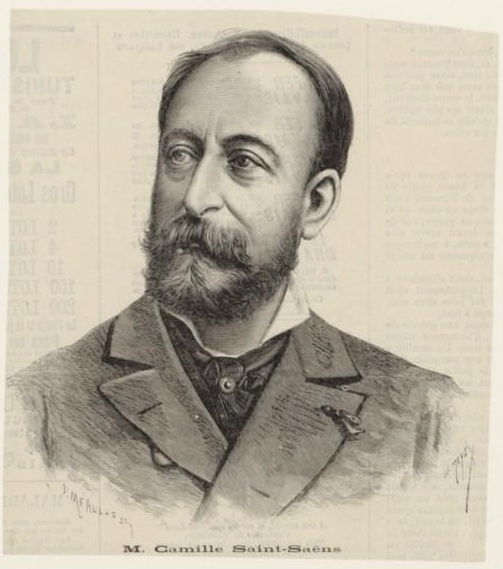
Camille Saint-Saëns

The last two decades of the 19th century saw a revival of interest in Bach's organ music in France. There were public concerts on the new Cavaillé-Colle organ in the concert hall or Salle des Fêtes of the old Palais du Trocadéro, built for the third Paris exhibition in 1878. Organized by the organist Alexandre Guilmant, a pupil of Lemmens, in conjunction with Eugène Gigout, these started as six free concerts during the exhibition. Attracting huge crowds—the concert hall could seat 5,000 with sometimes an extra 2,000 standing—the concerts continued until the turn of the century. Guilmant programmed primarily the organ music of the two composers whom he referred to as "musical giants", Bach and Handel, still mostly unknown to these mass audiences, as well as the works of older masters such as Buxtehude and Frescobaldi. The St Anne prelude and fugue featured in the concerts, Saint-Saëns playing it in one of the first in 1879 and Guilmant again in 1899, in a special concert to mark the twentieth anniversary of the series. The concerts represented a new fin de siècle cult of Bach in France. It was not without its detractors: the music critic Camille Bellaigue (1858–1930) described Bach in 1888 as a "first-rate bore":

Of all the great musicians, the greatest, that is to say he without whom music itself would not exist, the founder, the patriarch, the Abraham, the Noah, the Adam of music, Johann Sebastian Bach, is the most tedious. ... How many times, crushed under these four-square merciless rhythms, lost amid this algebra of sound, this living geometry, smothered by the answers of these interminable fugues, one wants to close one's ears to this prodigious counterpoint ...

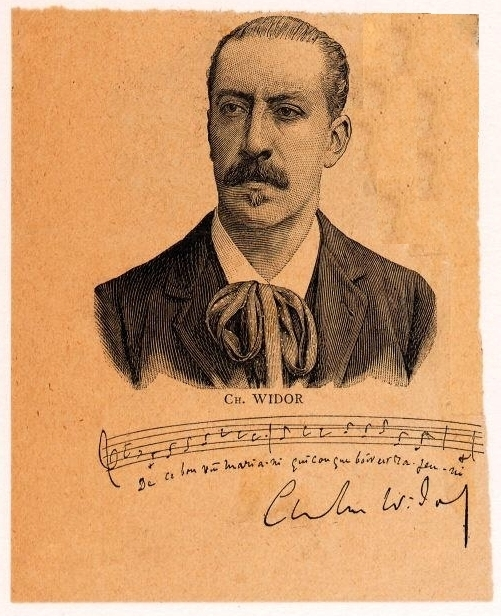
Charles-Marie Widor

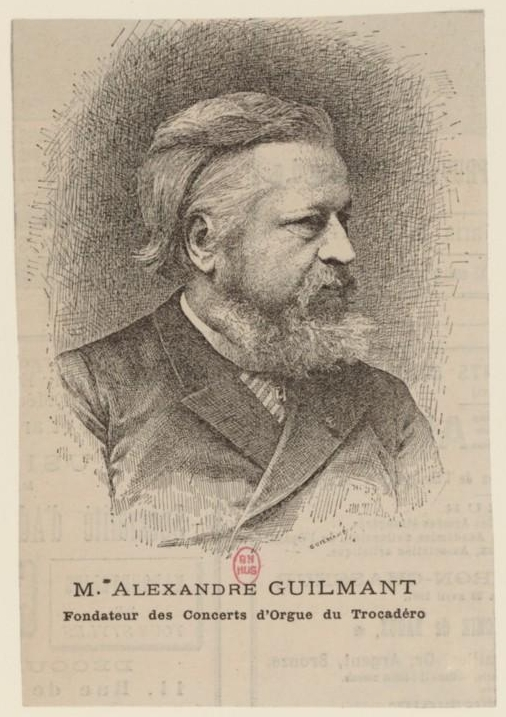
Alexandre Guilmant

Marcel Dupré at his home in Meudon in front of the Cavaillé-Coll organ previously owned by Guilmant

The chorale preludes of Bach were late to enter the French organ repertoire. César Franck, although only known to have performed one work by Bach in public, often set chorale preludes (BWV 622 and BWV 656) as examination pieces at the Conservatoire de Paris in the 1870s and 1880s. It was Charles-Marie Widor, Franck's successor on his death in 1890, who introduced the chorale preludes as a fundamental part of organ teaching there, where Bach's other organ works already provided the foundation stone. Widor believed that the music of Bach represented

the emotion of the infinite and exalted, for which words are an inadequate expression, and which can find proper utterence only in art ... it tunes the soul to a state in which we can grasp the truth and oneness of things, and rise above everything that is paltry, everything that divides us.

Unlike Saint-Saëns and his own teacher Lemmens, Widor had no objection to playing Bach organ music because of its Lutheran associations: "What speaks through his works is pure religious emotion; and this is one and the same in all men, in spite of the national and religious partitions in which we are born and bred." His student, the blind composer and organist, Louis Vierne later recalled:

At the reopening of the class at the beginning of 1892, there occurred an event of considerable importance to our artistic development. I mean the discovery of Bach's chorale preludes. I mean "discovery", and this is not an exaggeration, as you may judge for yourselves. At the first class in performance, Widor remarked with some surprise that since his arrival at the Conservatoire not one of us had brought in one of the celebrated chorales. For my part I was acquainted with three of them, published in Braille for the edition Franck had prepared for our school. They had seemed to me to have no technical difficulties and I had paid no further attention to them. My classmates did not even know that they existed. On looking through the music cabinet where there were several books in the Richault edition, we discovered three volumes, two of preludes and fugues and one of chorale preludes, the latter completely untouched, its leaves uncut. The Maître spent the entire class playing these pieces to us, and we were bowled over. The most overwhelming parts of the giant's organ works were suddenly revealed to us. We set to work on them at once, and for three months nothing else was heard in class. We all played chorale preludes at the examination in January, and the surprise of the jury was no less great than our own had been. Upon leaving the hall I heard Ambroise Thomas remark to Widor, "What music! Why didn't I know about that forty years ago? It ought to be the Bible of all musicians, and especially of organists.

On Widor's recommendation, Guilmant succeeded him as professor of organ in the conservatory in 1896. In 1899, he installed a three manual Cavaillé-Coll organ in his home in Meudon, where he gave lessons to a wide range of pupils, including a whole generation of organists from the United States. Among his French students were Nadia Boulanger, Marcel Dupré and Georges Jacob. Dupré started lessons with Guilmant at the age of eleven, later becoming his successor at the conservatoire. In two celebrated series of concerts at the conservatoire in 1920 and at the Palais du Trocadéro the following year, Dupré performed the complete organ works of Bach from memory in 10 concerts: the ninth concert was devoted entirely to the chorale preludes from Clavier-Übung III. Dupré also taught in Meudon, having acquired Guilmant's Cavaillé-Coll organ in 1926. The funeral service for Guilmant at his home in 1911, prior to his burial in Paris, included a performance by Jacob of Aus tiefer Noth BWV 686.

== Historic transcriptions ==
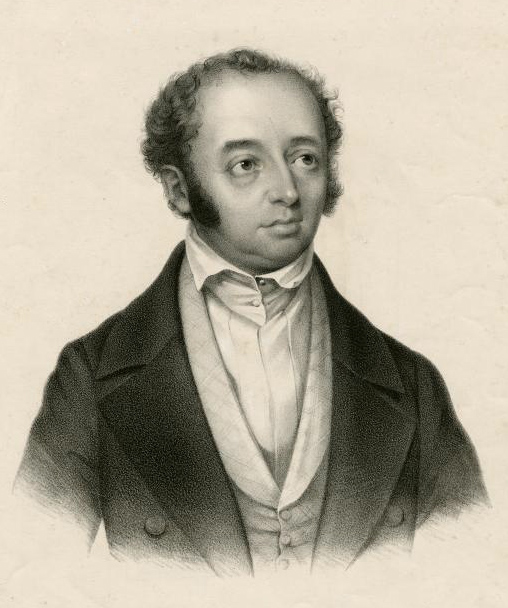
Adolf Bernhard Marx

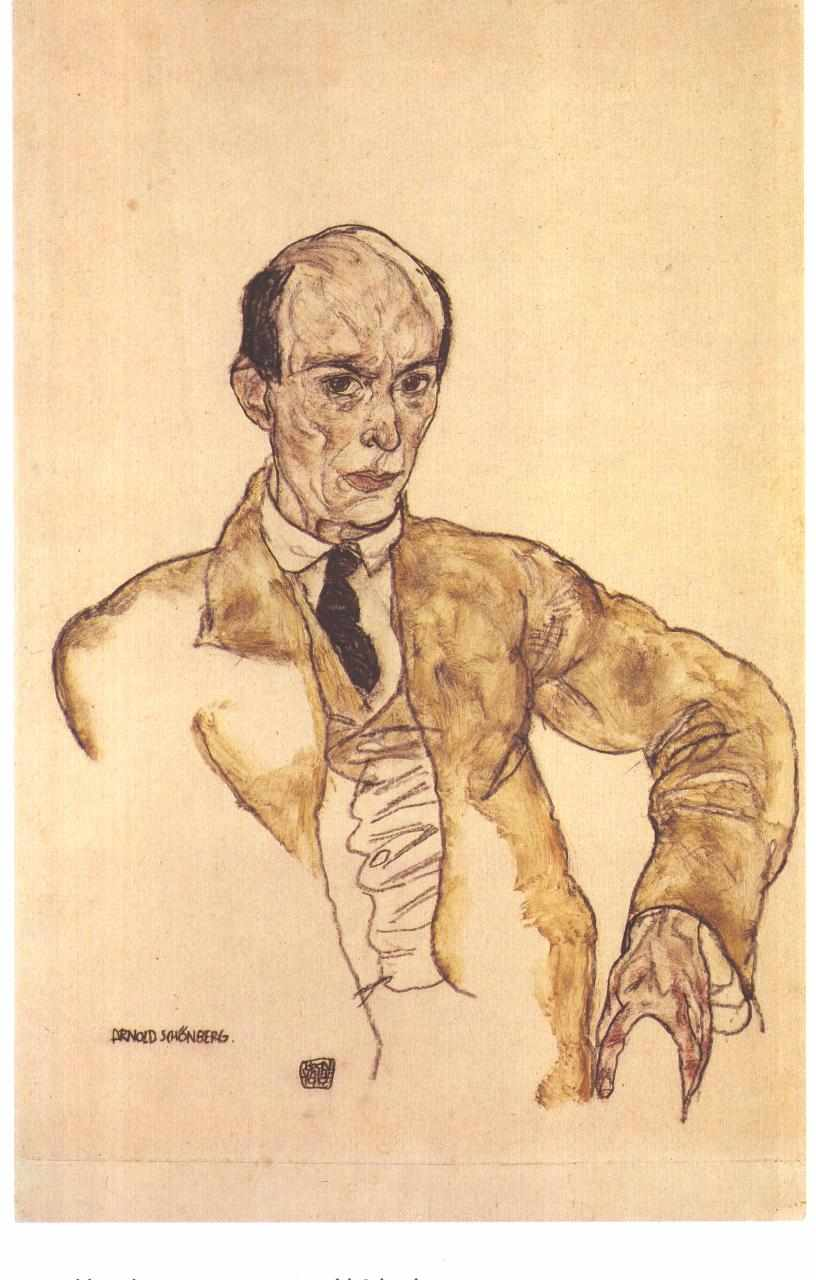
Egon Schiele, 1917: Arnold Schoenberg

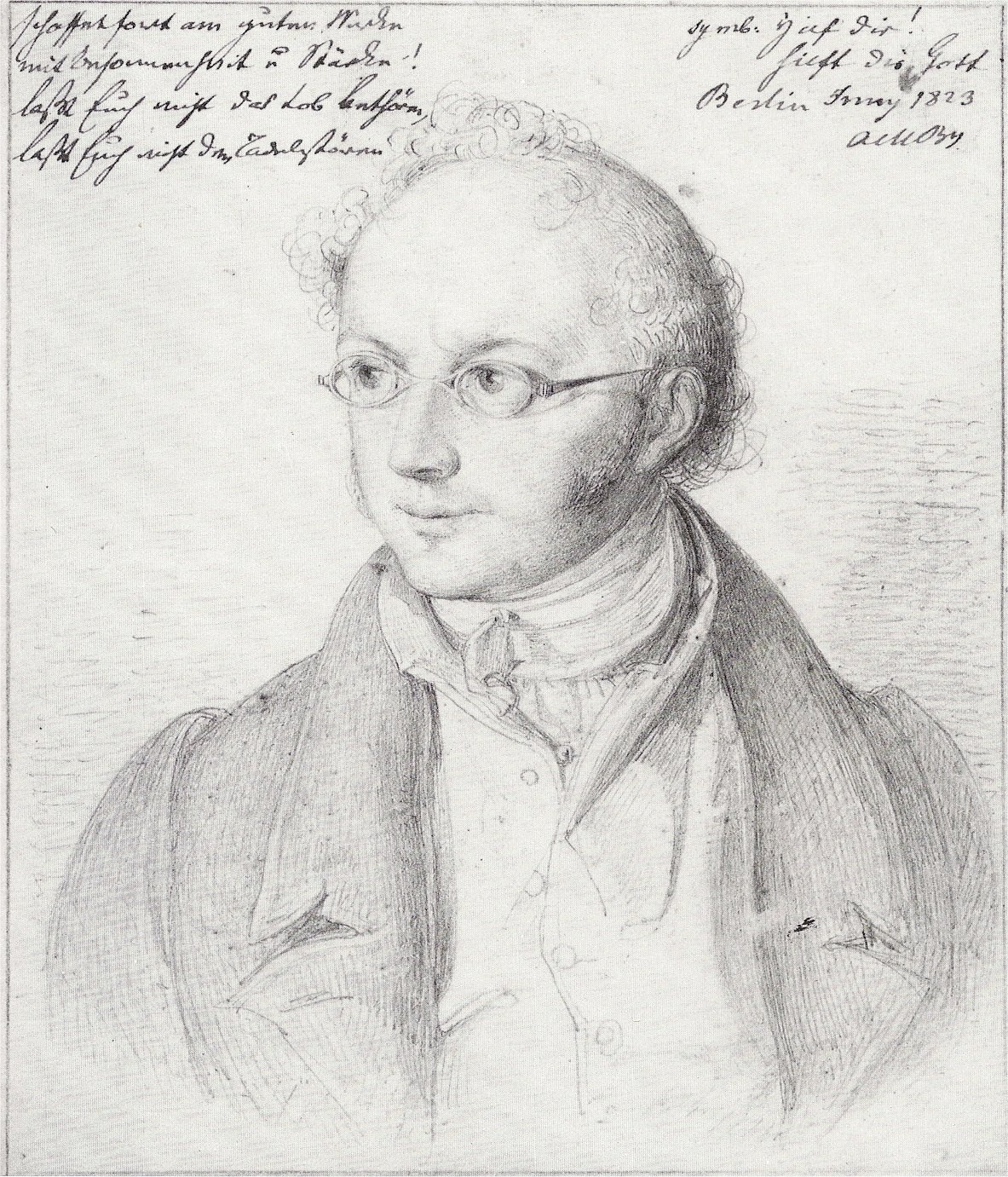
Wilhelm Hensel, 1823: Abraham Mendelssohn

Piano

- Benjamin Jacob (1778–1829), arrangement of prelude and fugue BWV 552 for piano duet
- Ivan Karlovitsch Tscherlitzky (1799–1865), arrangement of prelude and fugue BWV 552 and chorale preludes BWV 669–689 for piano solo
- Adolf Bernhard Marx (1795–1866), arrangement of chorale preludes BWV 679 and 683 for piano solo
- Franz Xavier Gleichauf (1801–1856), arrangement of prelude and fugue BWV 552 for piano duet
- Otto Singer (1833–1894), arrangement of prelude and fugue BWV 552 for two pianos
- Ludwig Stark (1831–1884), arrangement of prelude and fugue BWV 552 for piano solo
- Ernst Pauer (1826–1905), arrangement of prelude and fugue BWV 552 for piano duet
- Max Reger (1873–1916), arrangement of prelude and fugue BWV 552 for piano duet and piano solo
- Ferruccio Busoni "freely arranged for concert use on the piano" the prelude and fugue BWV 552 in 1890
- August Stradal (1860–1930), arrangement of prelude and fugue BWV 552 for piano solo
- William G. Whittaker (1876–1944), arrangements of chorale preludes BWV 672–675, 677, 679, 681, 683, 685, 687, 689 for piano solo
- Christopher Le Fleming (1908–1985), arrangement of prelude and fugue BWV 552 for two pianos
- György Kurtág, Aus tiefer Noth schrei' ich zu dir BWV 687, transcribed for piano 4 hands from Játékok ("Games")

Orchestra

- Vincent Novello arranged the prelude of BWV 552 for orchestra and organ duet: it was first performed with Samuel Wesley and Novello at the organ in the Hanover Square Rooms in 1812.
- Leopold Stokowski, conductor of the Philadelphia Orchestra. Wir glauben all' an einen Gott BWV 680 and Aus tiefer Noth schrei' ich zu dir BWV 686 were among the 14 organ works of Bach orchestrated by Stokowski. Wir glauben was first performed on 15 March 1924, and recorded on 1 May 1929.
- Ralph Vaughan Williams, arrangement of Wir glauben all' an einen Gott BWV 680 for string orchestra, 1925 (there is also a simplified version by Arnold Foster)
- Arnold Schoenberg recomposed the prelude and fugue BWV 552 for orchestra in 1928; Its first performance was conducted by Anton Webern in 1929.
- Henri Verbrugghen (1873–1934), arranged the prelude and fugue BWV 552 for orchestra.
- Philip James (1890–1975), arrangement of Wir glauben all' an einen Gott BWV 680 for orchestra, 1929.
- Fabien Sevitzky (1891–1967), arrangement of Wir glauben all' an einen Gott BWV 680 for orchestra, 1937.
- Alan Bush (1900–1995), arrangement of Kyrie, Gott, heiliger Geist BWV 671 and the fugue on Jesus Christus, unser Heiland BWV 689 for string orchestra, first performed in the Cambridge Arts Theatre in November 1941.
- Alfred Akon (1905–1977), arrangement of Wir glauben all' an einen Gott BWV 680 for string orchestra, 1942.
- Herman Boessenroth (1884–1968), arrangement of Wir glauben all' an einen Gott BWV 680 for full orchestra, 1942.
- Frederick Stock, conductor of the Chicago Symphony Orchestra, arranged the prelude and fugue BWV 552 for orchestra, recording it with them on 22 December 1944.

Chamber ensembles

- Abraham Mendelssohn (1776–1835), arrangement of Vater unser im Himmelreich BWV 682 for flute, violin, viola, cello and organ
- Ferdinand David (1810–1873), arrangement of Duetti BWV 802–805 for violin and viola.

== Recordings ==
- Marie-Claire Alain, Complete works for organ of Bach, Erato, discs 6 and 7.
- André Isoir, Complete works for organ of Bach, Calliope, discs 13 and 14.
- Ton Koopman, Bach organ works, Volume 5, Das Alte Werk, Teldec, 2 CDs.
- Bernard Foccroulle, Complete organ works of Bach, Ricercar/Allegro, discs 11 and 12.
- Matteo Messori, Dritter Theil der Clavier-Übung, Brilliant Classics, 2 SuperAudioCDs or CDs.
- Helmut Walcha, Complete organ works of Bach, Documents, Membran Musics, discs 8 and 9.

== See also ==
- List of compositions by Johann Sebastian Bach printed during his lifetime
