= Reception of Johann Sebastian Bach's music =

History of musical appreciation

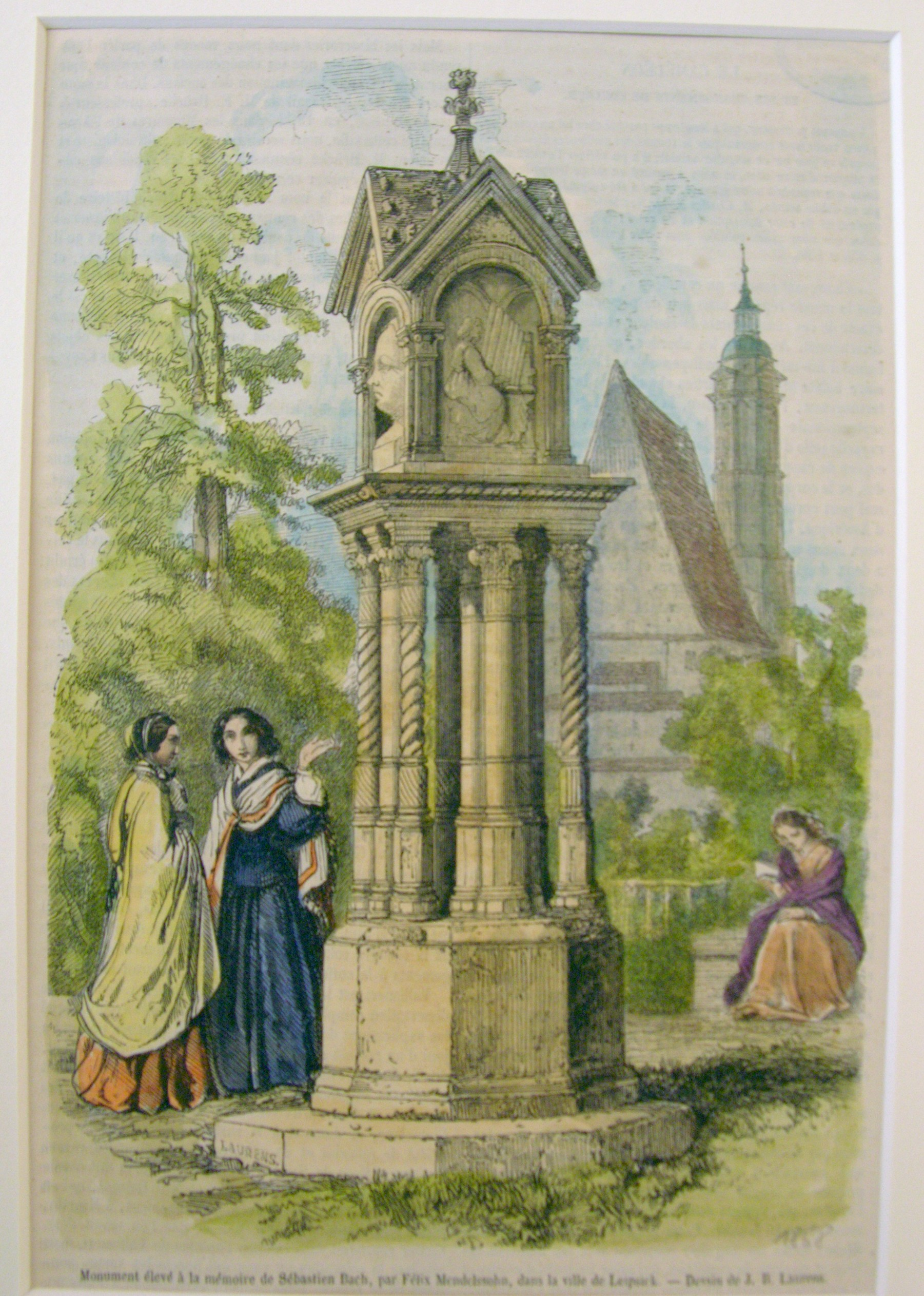
Eduard Holzstich, 1850: watercolour of the Bach memorial, erected by Felix Mendelssohn in Leipzig in 1843 in front of the Thomaskirche

In the 18th century, the appreciation of Johann Sebastian Bach's music was mostly limited to distinguished connoisseurs. The 19th century started with publication of the first biography of the composer and ended with the completion of the publication of all of Bach's known works by the Bach Gesellschaft. The "Bach Revival" started with Felix Mendelssohn's performance of the St Matthew Passion in 1829. Soon after that performance, Bach started to become regarded as one of the greatest composers of all time, if not the greatest, a reputation he has retained ever since. A new extensive Bach biography was published in the second half of the 19th century.

In the 20th century, Bach's music was widely performed and recorded, while the Neue Bachgesellschaft, among others, published research on the composer. Modern adaptations of Bach's music contributed greatly to his popularisation in the second half of the 20th century. Among these were the Swingle Singers' versions of Bach pieces (for instance, the Air from Orchestral Suite No. 3, or the Wachet auf... chorale prelude) and Wendy Carlos' 1968 Switched-On Bach, which used the Moog electronic synthesiser.

By the end of the 20th century, more classical performers were gradually moving away from the performance style and instrumentation that were established in the romantic era: they started to perform Bach's music on period instruments of the baroque era, studied and practised playing techniques and tempi as established in his time, and reduced the size of instrumental ensembles and choirs to what he would have employed. The BACH motif, used by the composer in his own compositions, was used in dozens of tributes to the composer from the 19th century to the 21st. In the 21st century, the complete extant output of the composer became available online, with several websites exclusively dedicated to him.

== 18th century ==
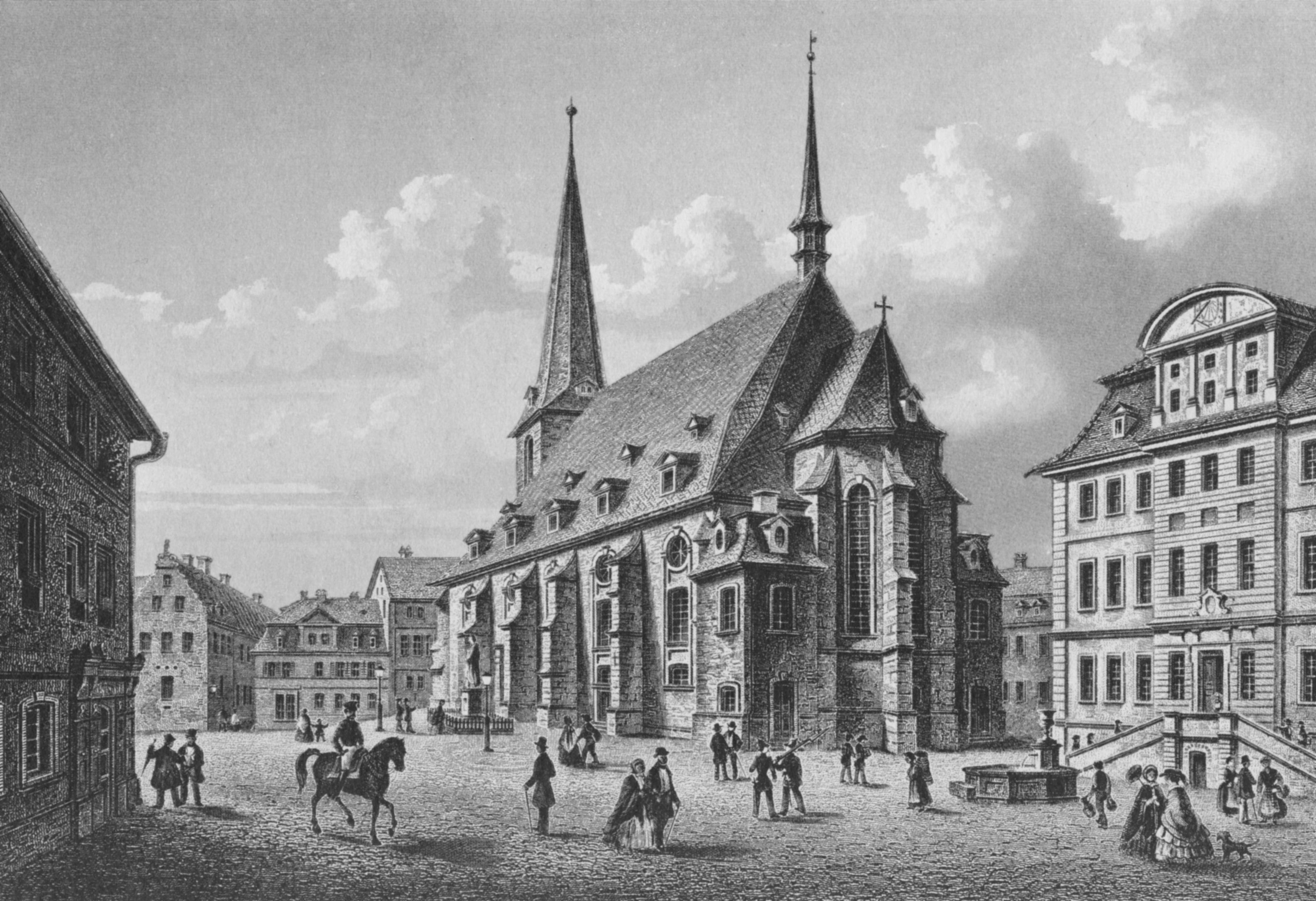
Engraving of the Church of St Peter and St Paul in Weimar, 1840

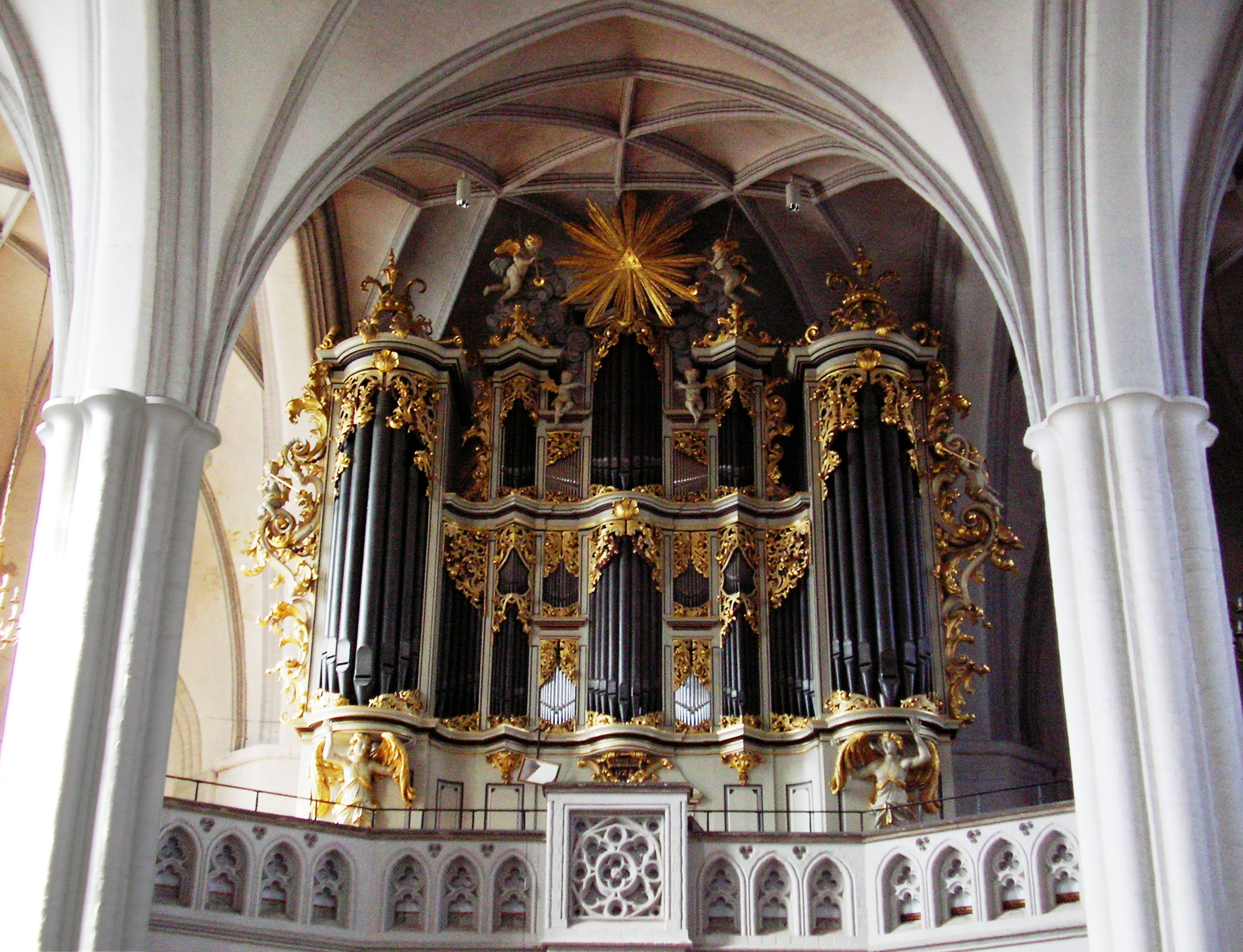
Organ in the Marienkirche, Berlin

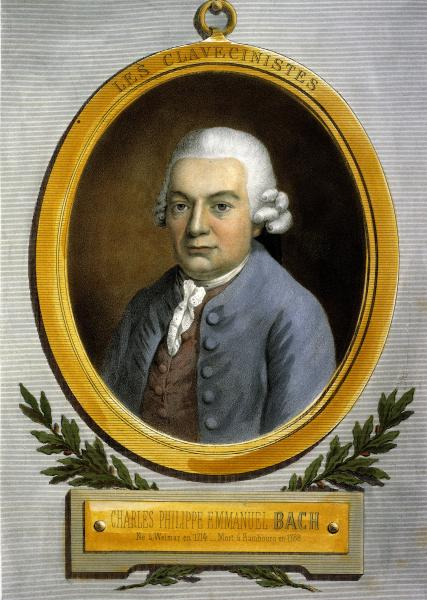
C. P. E. Bach

In his own time, Bach's reputation equalled that of Telemann, Graun and Handel. During his life, Bach received public recognition, such as the title of court composer by Augustus III of Poland and the appreciation he was shown by Frederick the Great and Hermann Karl von Keyserling. Such highly placed appreciation contrasted with the humiliations he had to cope with, for instance in Leipzig. Also in the contemporary press, Bach had his detractors, such as Johann Adolf Scheibe, suggesting he write less complex music, and his supporters, such as Johann Mattheson and Lorenz Christoph Mizler.

After his death, Bach's reputation as a composer at first declined: his work was regarded as old-fashioned compared to the emerging galant style. (Note: Bach was regarded as "passé even in his own lifetime".) Initially, he was remembered more as a virtuoso player of the organ and as a teacher. The bulk of the music that had been printed during the composer's lifetime, at least the part that was remembered, was for the organ and the harpsichord. Thus, his reputation as a composer was initially mostly limited to his keyboard music, and that even fairly limited to its value in music education.

Bach's surviving family members, who inherited a large part of his manuscripts, were not all equally concerned with preserving them, leading to considerable losses. Carl Philipp Emanuel, his second eldest son, was most active in safeguarding his father's legacy: he co-authored his father's obituary, contributed to the publication of his four-part chorales, staged some of his works, and the bulk of previously unpublished works of his father were preserved with his help. Wilhelm Friedemann, the eldest son, performed several of his father's cantatas in Halle but after becoming unemployed sold part of the large collection of his father's works he owned. Several students of the old master, such as his son-in-law Johann Christoph Altnickol, Johann Friedrich Agricola, Johann Kirnberger and Johann Ludwig Krebs, contributed to the dissemination of his legacy. The early devotees were not all musicians; for example, in Berlin, Daniel Itzig, a high official of Frederick the Great's court, venerated Bach. His eldest daughters took lessons from Kirnberger, and their younger sister Sara from Wilhelm Friedemann Bach, who was in Berlin from 1774 to 1784. Sara Itzig (married name: Levy) became an avid collector of works by Johann Sebastian Bach and his sons.

While in Leipzig, performances of Bach's church music were limited to some of his motets, and under cantor Doles some of his Passions. A new generation of Bach aficionados emerged: they studiously collected and copied his music, including some of his large-scale works such as the Mass in B minor and performed it privately. One such connoisseur was Gottfried van Swieten, a high-ranking Austrian official who was instrumental in passing Bach's legacy on to the composers of the Viennese school. Haydn owned manuscript copies of the Well-Tempered Clavier and the Mass in B minor and was influenced by Bach's music. Mozart owned a copy of one of Bach's motets, transcribed some of his instrumental works (K. 404a, 405), and wrote contrapuntal music influenced by his style. Beethoven played the entire Well-Tempered Clavier by the time he was 11 and described Bach as Urvater der Harmonie (progenitor of harmony).

=== In the composer's lifetime ===
The earliest known reference to Johann Sebastian Bach in print is a compliment by Mattheson:

Ich habe von dem berühmten Organisten zu Weimar, Hrn. Joh. Sebastian Bach, Sachen gesehen, so wohl vor die Kirche als vor die Faust, die gewiß so beschaffen sind, daß man den Mann hoch aestimiren muß.

— Das beschützte Orchestre (1717), p. 222
Translation:

From the famous organist in Weimar, Mr. Joh. Sebastian Bach, I saw works of such undeniable quality, both for performance in church and for keyboard, that the man should be held in high esteem.

— translation

Bach's cousin Johann Gottfried Walther published a Musicalisches Lexicon in 1732: in the publication he qualified Bach's keyboard compositions as outstanding (German: vortrefflich). In 1737, Scheibe published an unfavourable criticism, without naming his subject:

Der Herr — ist endlich in — der Vornehmste unter den Musicanten. Er ist ein außerordentlicher Künstler auf dem Clavier und auf der Orgel; und er hat zur Zeit nur einen angetroffen, mit welchem er um den Vorzug streiten kann. Ich habe diesen grossen Mann unterschiedenemale spielen hören. Man erstaunet bey seiner Fertigkeit, und man kan kaum begreifen, wie es möglich ist, daß er seine Finger und seine Füsse so sonderbar und so behend in einander schrencken, ausdehnen, und damit die weitesten Sprünge machen kan, ohne einen einzigen falschen Ton einzumischen oder durch eine so heftige Bewegung den Körper zu verstellen.
Dieser grosse Mann würde die Bewunderung ganzer Nationen seyn, wenn er mehr Annehmlichkeit hätte, und wenn er nicht seinen Stücken durch ein schwülstiges und verworrenes Wesen das Natürliche entzöge, und ihre Schönheit durch allzugrosse Kunst verdunkelte.

— Der critische Musicus (1738 reprint), p. 46
Translation:

Finally, Mr. — is the most eminent of the Musikanten in —. He is an extraordinary artist on the clavier and on the organ, and he has until now encountered only one person with whom he can dispute the palm of superiority. I have heard this great man play on various occasions. One is amazed at his ability, and one can hardly conceive how it is possible for him to achieve such agility, with his fingers and with his feet, in the crossings, extensions, and extreme jumps that he manages, without mixing in a single wrong tone, or displacing his body by any violent movement.
This great man would be the admiration of whole nations if he had more amenity, if he did not take away the natural element in his pieces by giving them a turgid and confused style, and if he did not darken their beauty by an excess of art.

— translation

"Mr. —" being identified as Bach, and the "person with whom he can dispute the palm" as Georg Frideric Handel, Johann Abraham Birnbaum, a professor of Leipzig University, published a defence of the "royal Polish and Saxonian electoral court composer and chapel master Mr. Johann Sebastian Bach" (German: Königl. Pohln. und Churfl. Sächsische Hof-Compositeur und Capell-Meister Herr Johann Sebastian Bach):

Der Herr Hof-Compositeur ist ein grosser Componist, ein meister der Music, ein virtuos auf der orgel und dem clavier der seines gleichen nicht hat ...

— Unpartheyische Anmerckungen (January 1738)
Translation:

The court composer is a great composer, a master of music, a virtuoso on the organ and the keyboard, who has no equal ...

— translation

Agreeing with Birnbaum's views, Mizler republished his Unpartheyische Anmerckungen a few months later.

=== Second half of the 18th century ===
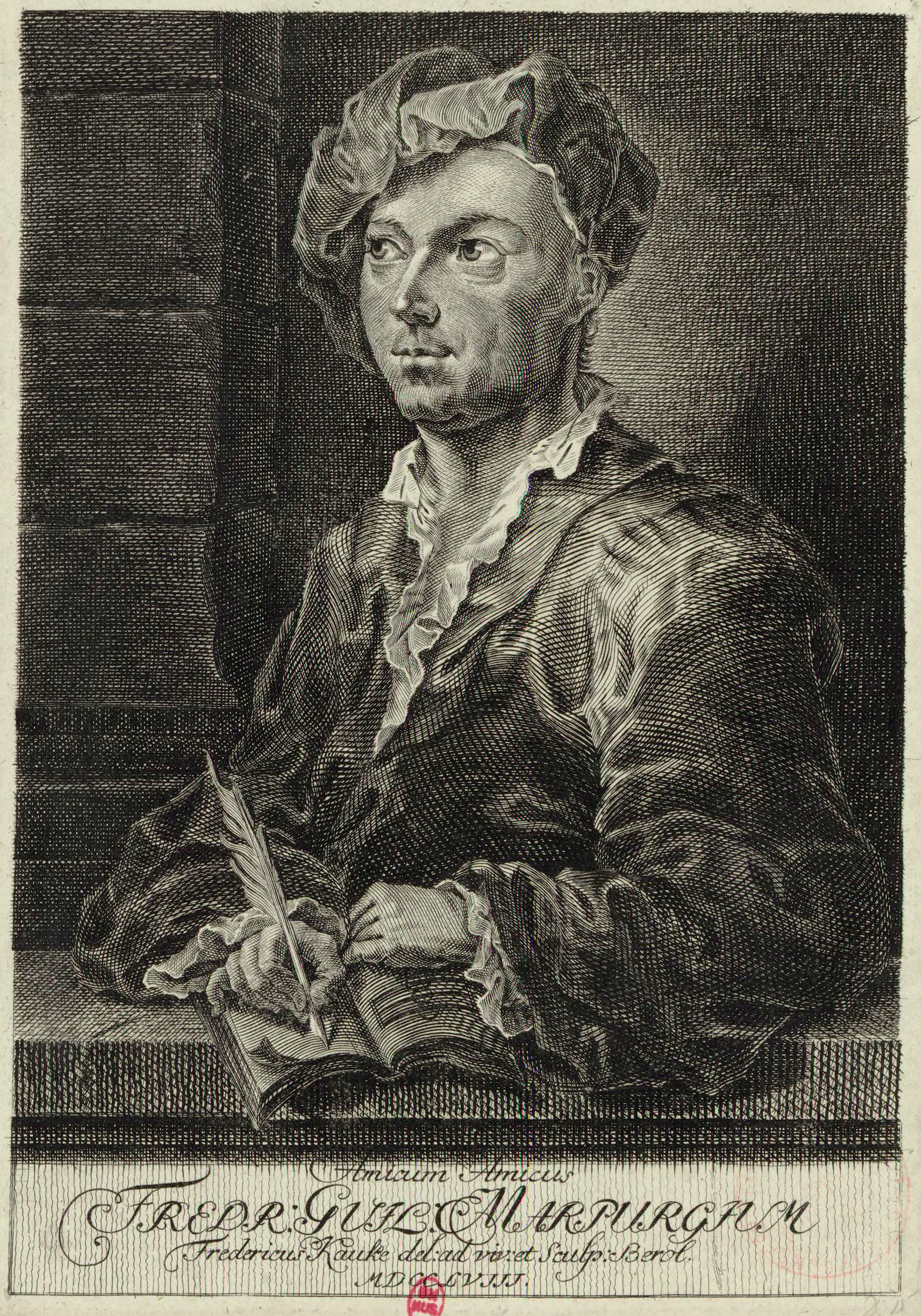
Friedrich Marpurg

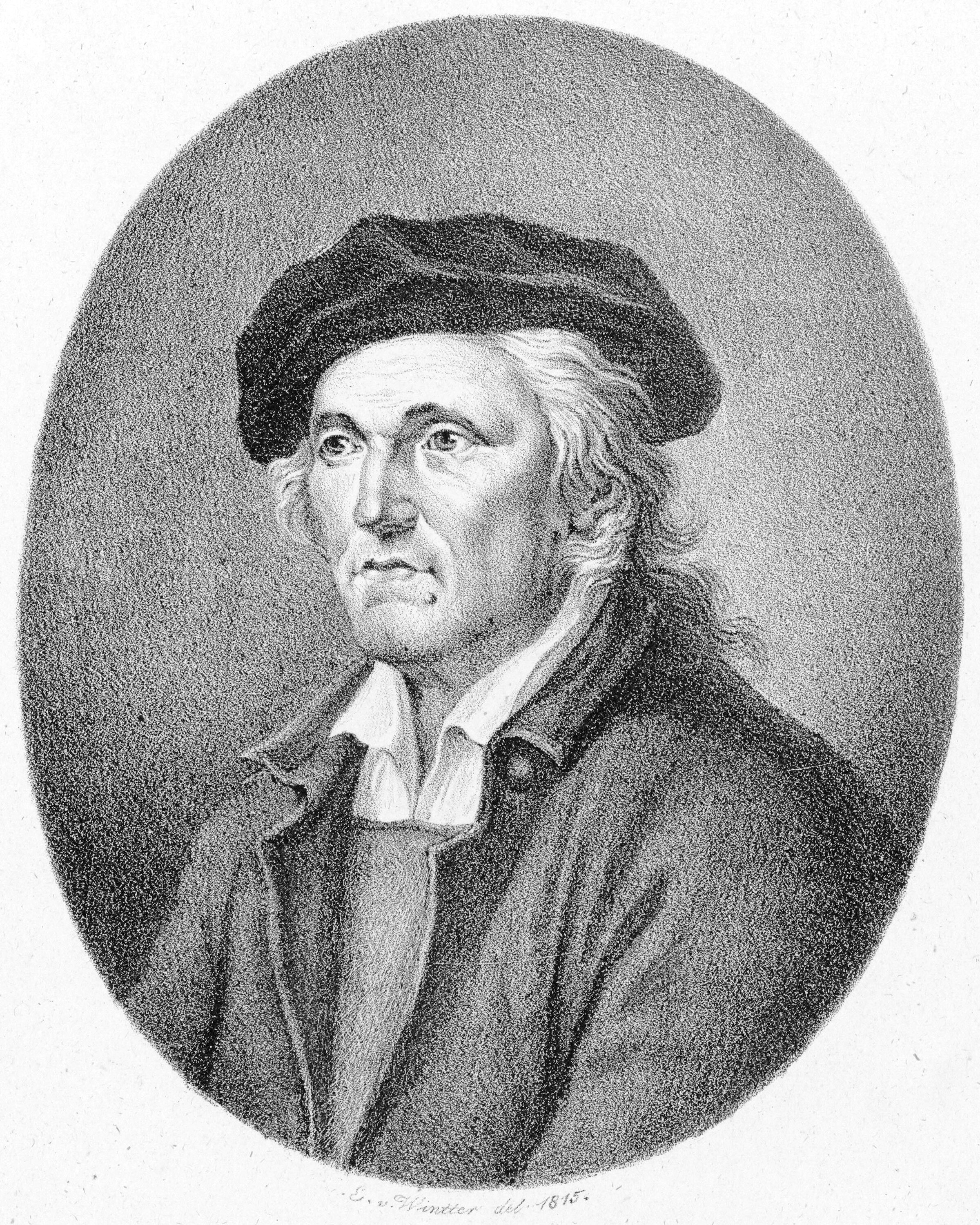
Johann Kirnberger

From 1760 onwards a small group of ardent supporters became active in Berlin, keen to preserve his reputation and promulgate his oeuvre. The group centred around his son Carl Philipp Emanuel Bach, who in 1738 at the age of 24 had been appointed court harpsichordist at Potsdam to Frederick the Great, then crown prince before his accession to the throne in 1740. C.P.E. Bach remained in Berlin until 1768, when he was appointed Kapellmeister in Hamburg in succession to Georg Philipp Telemann. (His brother Wilhelm Friedemann Bach moved to Berlin in 1774, although not to general acclaim, despite his accomplishments as an organist.) Other prominent members of the group included Bach's former pupils Johann Friedrich Agricola, court composer, first director of the Royal Opera House in Berlin and collaborator with Emanuel on Bach's obituary (the Nekrolog, 1754), and more significantly Johann Philipp Kirnberger.

Kirnberger became Kapellmeister to the court in 1758 and music teacher of Frederick's niece, Anna Amalia. Not only did Kirnberger build up a large collection of Bach's manuscripts in the Amalien-Bibliothek, but with Friedrich Wilhelm Marpurg he promoted Bach's compositions through theoretical texts, concentrating in particular on counterpoint with a detailed analysis of Bach's methods. The first of the two volumes of Marpurg's Treatise on fugue (Abhandlung von der Fuge, 1753–1754) cites the opening segment of the six-part fugal chorale prelude Aus tiefer Noth BWV 686 as one of its examples. Kirnberger produced his own extensive tract on composition Die Kunst des reinen Satzes in der Musik (The Art of Pure Composition in Music), twenty years later, between 1771 and 1779. In his treatise Marpurg had adopted some of the musical theories on the fundamental bass of Jean-Philippe Rameau from his Treatise on Harmony (1722) in explaining Bach's fugal compositions, an approach which Kirnberger rejected in his tract:

Rameau filled this theory with so many things that had no rhyme or reason that one must certainly wonder how such extravagant notions can have found belief and even champions among us Germans, since we have always had the greatest harmonists among us, and their manner of treating harmony was certainly not to be explained according to Rameau's principles. Some even went so far that they preferred to deny the soundness of a Bach in his procedure with respect to the treatment and progression of chords, rather than admit that the Frenchman could have erred.

This led to an acrimonious dispute in which both claimed to speak with Bach's authority. When Marpurg made the tactical error of suggesting that, "His famous son in Hamburg ought to know something about this, too", Kirnberger responded in the introduction to the second volume of his tract:

Moreover, what Mr. Bach, Capellmeister in Hamburg, thinks of the excellent work of Mr. Marpurg, is shown by some passages from a letter that this famous man has written to me: "The behaviour of Mr. Marpurg towards you is execrable." Further: "You may loudly proclaim that my basic principles and those of my late father are anti-Rameau."

Through Bach's pupils and family, copies of his keyboard works were disseminated and studied throughout Germany; the diplomat Baron van Swieten, Austrian envoy to the Prussian court from 1770 to 1777 and afterwards patron of Mozart, Haydn and Beethoven, was responsible for relaying copies from Berlin to Vienna. The reception of the works was mixed, partly because of their technical difficulty: composers like Mozart, Beethoven and Rust embraced these compositions, particularly The Well-Tempered Clavier; but, as Johann Adam Hiller reported in 1768, many amateur musicians found them too hard ("Sie sind zu schwer! Sie gefallen mir nicht").

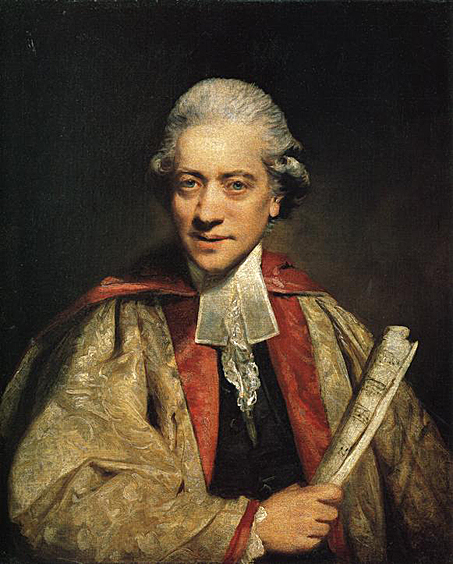
Charles Burney

Twenty-one prints of the original 1739 edition of Clavier-Übung III survive today. Because of its high price, this edition did not sell well: even 25 years later in 1764, C.P.E. Bach was still trying to dispose of copies. Because of changes in popular tastes after Bach's death, the publisher Johann Gottlob Immanuel Breitkopf, son of Bernhard Christoph Breitkopf, did not consider it economically viable to prepare new printed editions of Bach's works; instead he retained a master copy of Clavier-Übung III in his large library of original scores from which handwritten copies (hand-exemplar) could be ordered from 1763 onwards. A similar service was provided by the musical publishers Johann Christoph Westphal in Hamburg and Johann Carl Friedrich Rellstab in Berlin.

Before 1800, there are very few reports of performances of Bach's works in England or of manuscript copies of his work. In 1770, Charles Burney, the musicologist and friend of Samuel Johnson and James Boswell, had made a tour of France and Italy. On his return in 1771 he published a report on his tour in The Present State of Music in France and Italy. Later that year in a letter to Christoph Daniel Ebeling, the music critic engaged in translating this work into German, Burney made one of his first references to Bach:

A long & laboured Fugue, recte et retro in 40 parts, may be a good Entertainment for the Eyes of a Critic, but can never delight the Ears of a Man of Taste. I was no less surprised than pleased to find Mr. C.P.E. Bach get out of the trammels of Fugues & crowded parts in which his father so excelled.

It was, however, only in the following year, during his tour of Germany and the Low Countries, that Burney received a copy of the first book of The Well-Tempered Clavier from C. P. E. Bach in Hamburg; according to his own reports, he was only to become familiar with its contents over thirty years later. He reported on his German tour in The Present State of Music in Germany, the Netherlands and United Provinces in 1773. The book contains the first English account of Bach's work and reflects the views commonly held at the time in England. Burney compared the learned style of Bach unfavourably with that of his son, whom he had visited:

How he formed his style, where he acquired all his taste and refinement, would be difficult to trace; he certainly neither inherited nor adopted them from his father, who was his only master; for that venerable musician, though unequalled in learning and contrivance, thought it so necessary to crowd into both hand all the harmony he could grasp, that he must inevitably have sacrificed melody and expression. Had the sone chosen a model, it would certainly have been his father, whom he highly reverenced; but as he has ever disdained imitation, he must have derive from nature alone, those fine feelings, that variety of new ideas, and selection of passages, which are so manifest in his compositions.

Burney summarised the musical contributions of J.S. Bach as follows:

Besides many excellent compositions for the church, this author produced Ricercari, consisting of preludes, fugues, upon two, three and four subjects; in Modo recto & contrario and in every one of the twenty-four keys. All the present organ-players of Germany are formed upon his school, as most of those on the harpsichord, clavichord and piano forte are upon that of his son, the admirable Carl. Phil. Emanuel Bach; so long known by the name of Bach of Berlin, but now music-director at Hamburg.

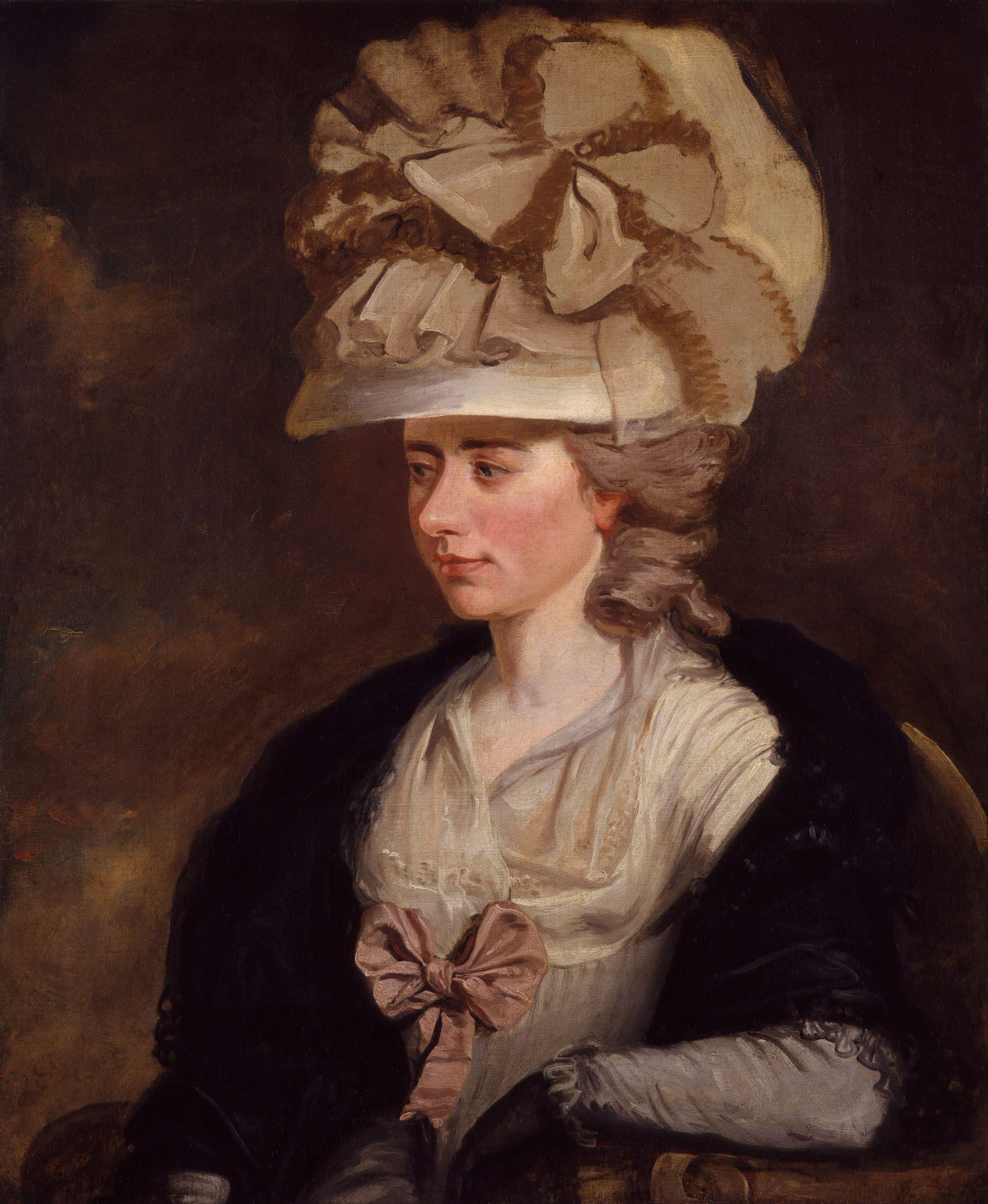
Fanny Burney

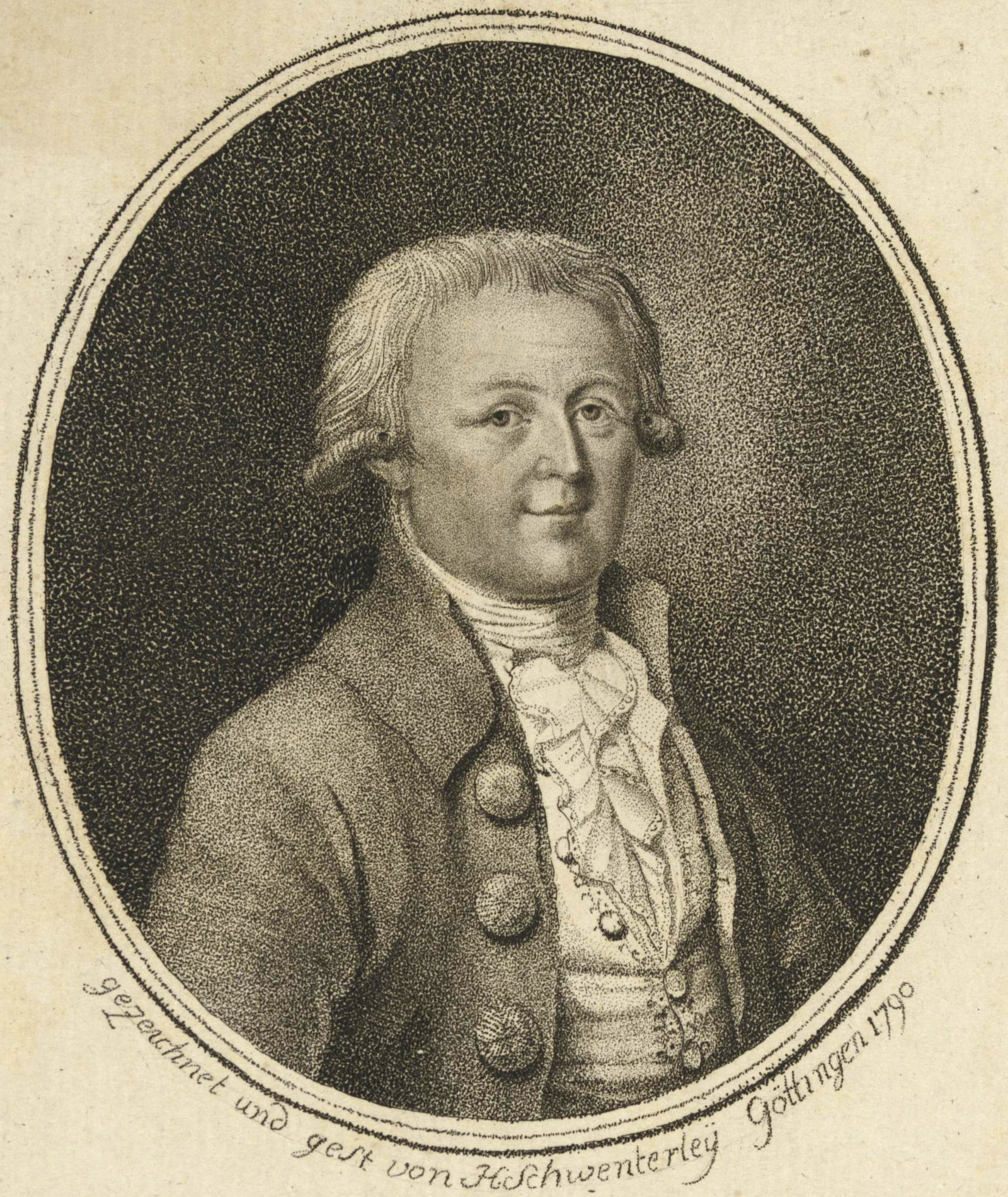
Johann Nikolaus Forkel

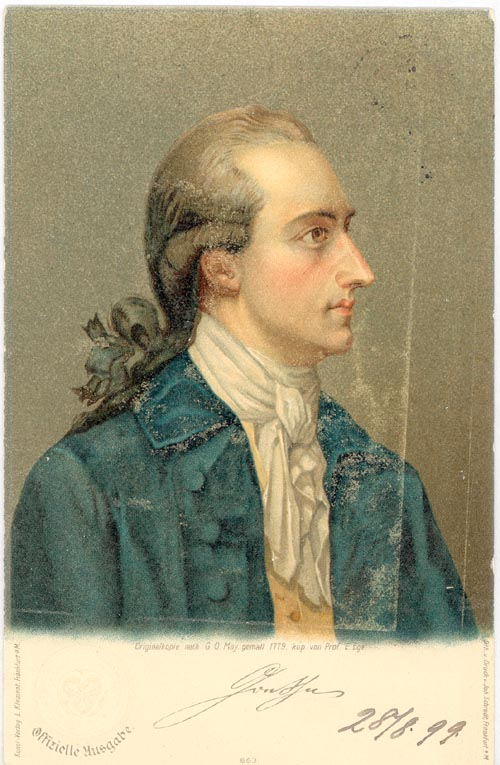
J. W. von Goethe

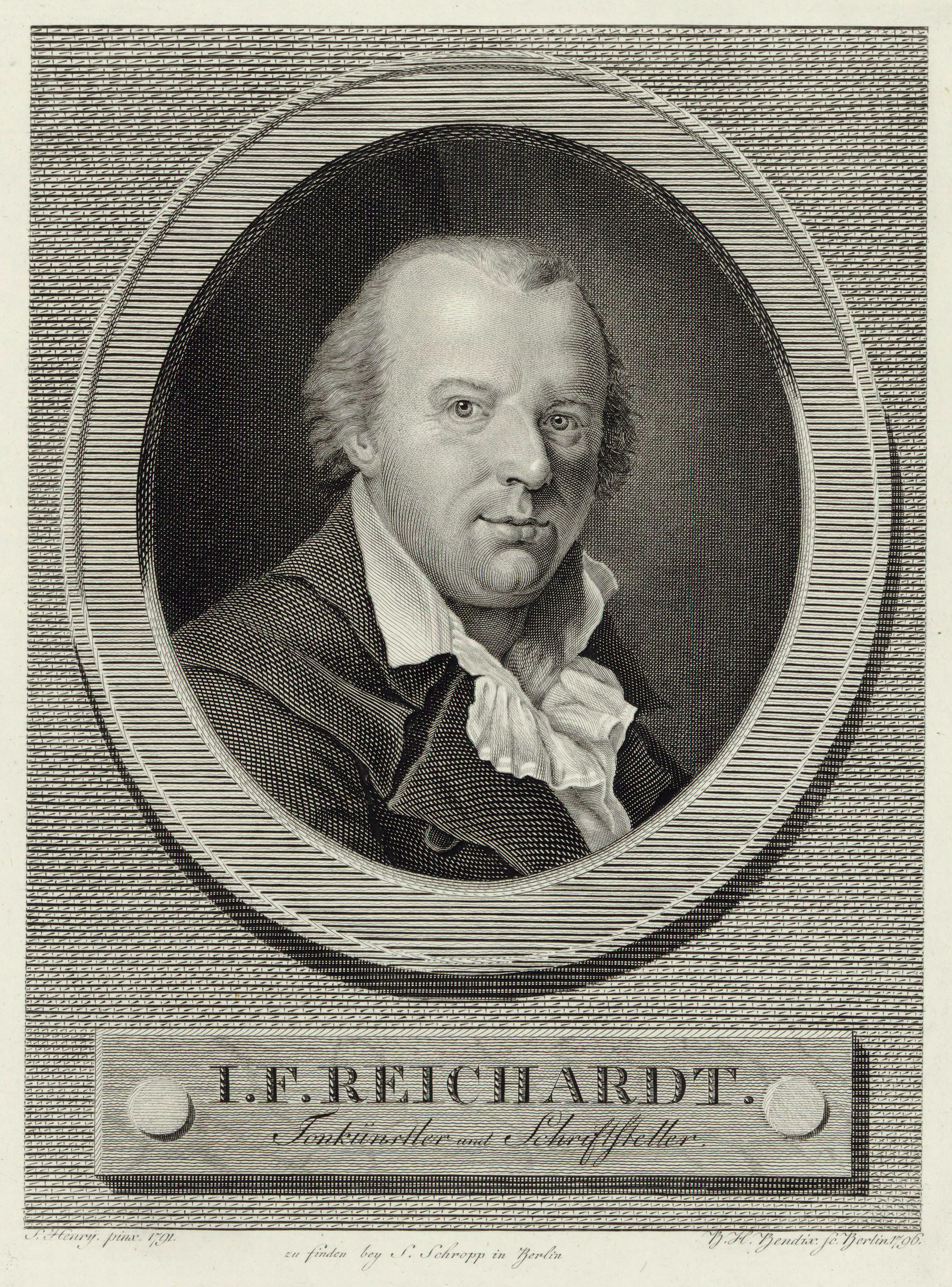
J. F. Reichardt

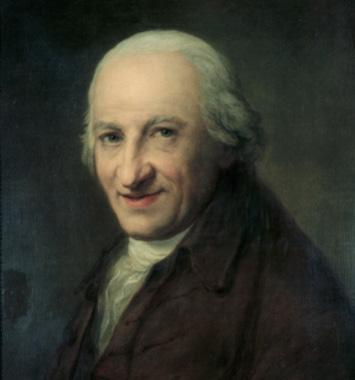
Carl Fasch

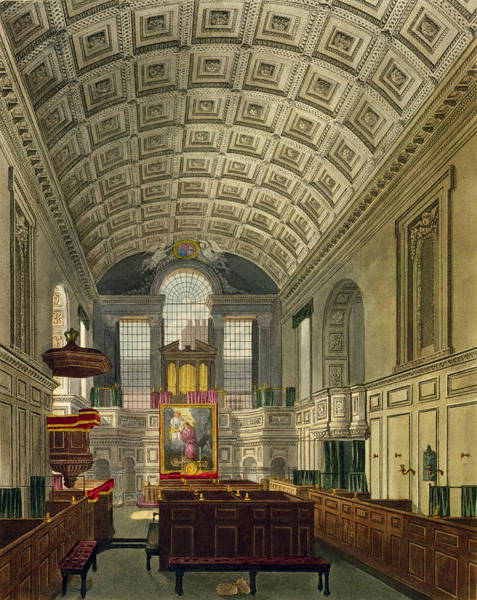
Interior of the Royal German Chapel, St James's Palace

As it is known that at the time Burney knew hardly any of Bach's compositions, it appears that his opinions of Bach came second-hand: the first sentence was almost certainly lifted directly from the French translation of Marpurg's Treatise on fugue, to which he had referred earlier in the book for biographical details; and in 1771 he had acquired Scheibe's writings through Ebeling. In Germany Burney's book was not well received, infuriating even his friend Ebeling: in a passage that he changed in later editions, he had repeated without attribution comments from a letter of Louis Devisme, British plenipotentiary in Munich, that, "if innate genius exists, Germany is certainly not the seat of it; though it must be allowed, to be that of perseverance and application." Once aware of the offence this might cause to Germans, Burney had marked with pencil the offending passages in the copy of his daughter Fanny Burney, when in 1786 she became lady-in-waiting to Queen Charlotte. Later that year, to Fanny's horror, the Queen requested that Fanny show her copy to her daughter Princess Elizabeth. The book was viewed by both King George III and Queen Charlotte, who accepted Fanny's hastily invented explanations of the markings; she similarly managed to excuse herself when Princess Elizabeth later read all the marked passages assuming them to be Fanny's favourites.

Johann Nikolaus Forkel, from 1778 the director of music in the University of Göttingen, was another promoter and collector of Bach's music. An active correspondent with both of Bach's sons in Berlin, he published the first detailed biography of Bach in 1802, Bach: On Johann Sebastian Bach's Life, Art and Works: For Patriotic Admirers of True Musical Art, including an appreciation of Bach's keyboard and organ music and ending with the injunction, "This man, the greatest orator-poet that ever addressed the world in the language of music, was a German! Let Germany be proud of him! Yes, proud of him, but worthy of him too!" In 1779, Forkel published a review of Burney's General History of Music in which he criticized Burney for dismissing German composers as "dwarves or musical ogres" because "they did not skip and dance before his eyes in a dainty manner"; instead he suggested it was more appropriate to view them as "giants".

Among his criticisms of Bach in the 1730s, Scheibe had written, "We know of composers who see it as an honour to be able to compose incomprehensible and unnatural music. They pile up musical figures. They make unusual embellishments. ... Are these not truly musical Goths!" Until the 1780s, the use of the word "gothic" in music was pejorative. In his entry for "harmony" in the influential Dictionnaire de Musique (1768), Jean-Jacques Rousseau, a fierce critic of Rameau, described counterpoint as a "gothic and barbaric invention", the antithesis of the melodic galante style. In 1772, Johann Wolfgang von Goethe gave a fundamentally different view of "gothic" art that would achieve widespread acceptance during the classical-romantic movement. In his celebrated essay on the cathedral in Strasbourg, where he was a student, Goethe was one of the first writers to connect gothic art with the sublime:

The first time I went to the minster I was full of the common notions of good taste. From hearsay I respected the harmony of mass, the purity of forms, and I was the sworn enemy of the confused caprices of Gothic ornament. Under the term gothic, like the article in a dictionary, I threw together all the synonymous misunderstandings, such as undefined, disorganized, unnatural, patched-together, tacked on, overloaded, which had gone through my head. ... How surprised I was when I was confronted by it! The impression which filled my soul was whole and large, and of a sort that—since it was composed of a thousand harmonizing details—I could relish and enjoy, but by no means identify and explain. ... How often have I returned from all sides, from all distances, in all lights, to contemplate its dignity and magnificence. It is hard on the spirit of man when his brother's work is so sublime that he can only bow and worship. How often has the evening twilight soothed with its friendly quiet my eyes, tired-out with questing, by blending the scattered parts into masses which now stood simple and large before my soul, and at once my powers unfolded rapturously to enjoy and understand.

In 1782, Johann Friedrich Reichardt, since 1775 the successor to Agricola as Capellmeister in the court of Frederic the Great, quoted this passage from Goethe in the Musicalisches Kunstmagazin to describe his personal reactions to the instrumental fugues of Bach and Handel. He prefaced his eulogy with a description of Bach as the greatest counterpuntalist ("harmonist") of his age:

There has never been a composer, not even the best and deepest of the Italians, who so exhausted all the possibilities of our harmony as did J. S. Bach. Almost no suspension is possible that he did not make use of, and he employed every proper harmonic art and every improper harmonic artifice a thousand times, in earnest and in jest, with such boldness and individuality that the greatest harmonist, if called upon to supply a missing measure in the theme of one of his greatest works, could not be entirely sure of having supplied it exactly as Bach had done. Had Bach had the high sense of truth and the deep feeling for expression that animated Handel, he would have been far greater even than Handel himself; but as it is, he is only much more erudite and industrious.

The unfavourable comparison to Handel was removed in a later reprinting in 1796, following adverse anonymous remarks in the Allgemeine Deutsche Bibliothek. Reichardt's comparison between Bach's music and the Gothic cathedral would often be repeated by composers and music critics. His student, the writer, composer and music critic E.T.A. Hoffmann, saw in Bach's music "the bold and wonderful, romantic cathedral with all its fantastic embellishments, which, artistically swept up into a whole, proudly and magnificently rise in the air." Hoffmann wrote of the sublime in Bach's music—the "infinite spiritual realm" in Bach's "mystical rules of counterpoint".

Another musician in C.P.E. Bach's circle was his friend Carl Friedrich Christian Fasch, son of the violinist and composer Johann Friedrich Fasch, who, on the death of Kuhnau in 1722, had turned down the post, later awarded to Bach, of kantor at the Thomaskirche, where he himself had been trained. From 1756 Carl Fasch shared the role of harpsichord accompanist to Frederick the Great at Potsdam with C.P.E. Bach. He briefly succeeded Agricola as director of the Royal Opera in 1774 for two years. In 1786. the year of Frederick the Great's death, Hiller organised a monumental performance in Italian of Handel's Messiah in a Berlin cathedral, recreating the scale of the 1784 London Handel Commemoration described in Burney's detailed account of 1785. Three years later in 1789, Fasch started an informal group in Berlin, formed from singing students and music lovers, that met for rehearsals in private homes. In 1791, with the introduction of a "presence book", it became officially known as the Sing-Akademie zu Berlin and two years later was granted its own rehearsal room in the Royal Academy of Arts in Berlin. As a composer, Fasch had learnt the old methods of counterpoint from Kirnberger and, like the Academy of Ancient Music in London, his initial purpose in founding the Sing-Akademie was to revive interest in neglected and rarely performed sacred vocal music, particularly that of J.S. Bach, Graun and Handel. The society subsequently built up an extensive library of baroque music of all types, including instrumental music.

Burney was aware of George III's preference for Handel when in 1785 he wrote in his account of the 1784 Handel Commemoration that "in his full, masterly and excellent organ-fugues, upon the most natural and pleasing subjects, he has surpassed Frescobaldi, and even Sebastian Bach, and others of his countrymen, the most renowned for abilities in this difficult and elaborate species of composition." His account was translated into German by Hiller. Writing anonymously in the Allgemeine Deutsche Bibliothek in 1788, C.P.E. Bach angrily responded that "there is nothing to be seen but partiality, and of any close acquaintance with the principal works of J.S. Bach for organ we find in Dr. Burney's writings no trace." Undeterred by such comments in 1789, a year after C.P.E. Bach's death, Burney echoed Scheibe's earlier comparison of Bach and Handel when he wrote in his General History of Music:

The very terms of Canon and Fugue imply restraint and labour. Handel was perhaps the only great Fughuist, exempt from pedantry. He seldom treated barren or crude subjects; his themes being almost always natural and pleasing. Sebastian Bach, on the contrary, like Michel Angelo in painting, disdained facility so much, that his genius never stooped to the easy and graceful. I never have seen a fugue by this learned and powerful author upon a motivo, that is natural and chantant; or even an easy and obvious passage, that is not loaded with crude an difficult accompaniments.

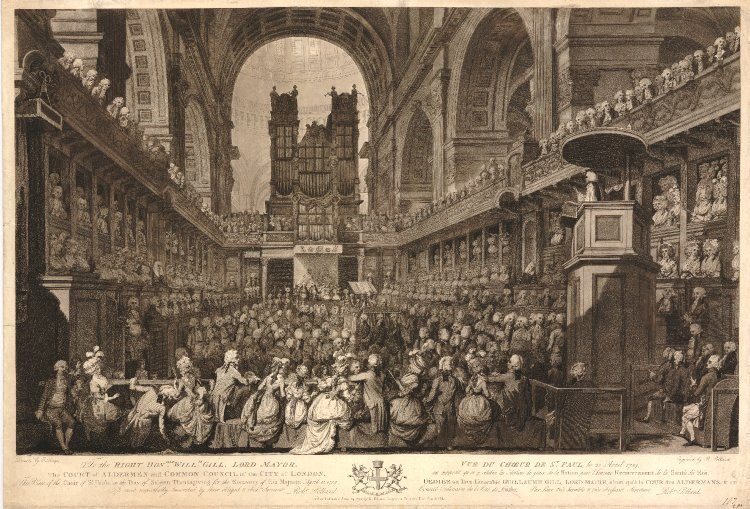
Thanksgiving service in 1789 for the recovery of George III in St Paul's Cathedral. The Grand Organ, built by Father Smith with a case designed by Christopher Wren, can be seen in the background.

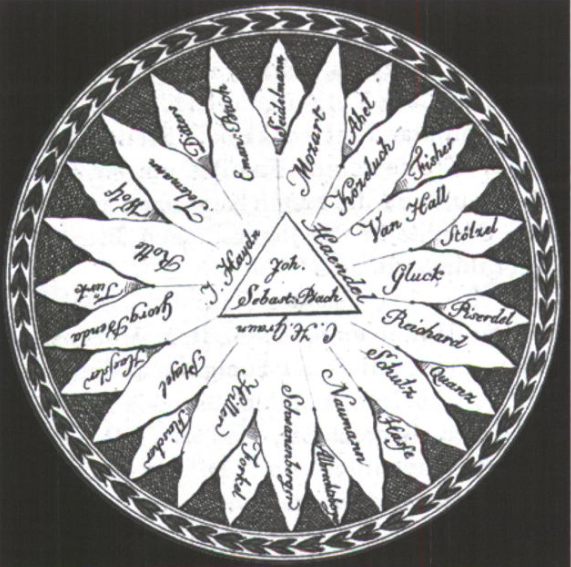
Kollmann, 1799: Engraving of the sun with Bach at the centre, included by Forkel in the Allgem. Mus. Zeitung

Burney reflected the English predilection for opera when he added:

If Sebastian Bach and his admirable son Emmanuel, instead of being music-directors in commercial cities, had been fortunately employed to compose for the stage and public of great capitals, such as Naples, Paris, or London, and for performers of the first class, they would doubtless have simplified their style more to the level of their judges; the one would have sacrificed all unmeaning art and contrivance, and the other have been less fantastical and recherché; and both, by writing a style more popular, would have extended their fame, and been indisputably the greatest musicians of the eighteenth century.

Despite Burney's antipathy towards Bach prior to 1800, there was an "awakening" of interest in the music of Bach in England, spurred on by the presence of émigré musicians from Germany and Austria, trained in the musical tradition of Bach. From 1782 Queen Charlotte, a dedicated keyboard player, had as music teacher the German-born organist Charles Frederick Horn; and in the same year Augustus Frederic Christopher Kollmann was summoned by George III from the Electorate of Hanover to act as organist and schoolmaster at the Royal German Chapel at St James's Palace. It is probable that they were instrumental in acquiring for her in 1788 a bound volume from Westphal of Hamburg containing Clavier-Übung III in addition to both books of The Well-Tempered Clavier. Other German musicians moving in royal circles included Johann Christian Bach, Carl Friedrich Abel, Johann Christian Fischer, Frederick de Nicolay, Wilhelm Cramer and Johann Samuel Schroeter.

More significant for the 19th-century English Bach revival was the presence of a younger generation of German-speaking musicians in London, well versed in the theoretical writings of Kirnberger and Marpurg on counterpoint but not dependent on royal patronage; these included John Casper Heck (c. 1740 – 1791), Charles Frederick Baumgarten (1738–1824) and Joseph Diettenhofer (c. 1743 – c. 1799). Heck in particular promoted fugues in his treatise "The Art of Playing the Harpsichord" (1770), describing them later as "a particular stile of music peculiar to the Organ than the Harpsichord"; in his biographical entry for Bach in the 1780s in the Musical Library and Universal Magazine, he gave examples of counterpoint from Bach's late period (Canonic Variations, The Art of Fugue). Diettenhofer prepared A Selection of Ten Miscellaneous Fugues, including his own completion of the unfinished Contrapunctus XIV BWV 1080/19 from The Art of Fugue; prior to their publication in 1802 these were "tried at the Savoy Church, Strand before several Organists and eminent Musicians ... who were highly gratified and recommended their Publication." The enthusiasm of these German musicians was shared by the organist Benjamin Cooke and his student the organist and composer John Wall Calcott. Cooke knew them through the Royal Society of Musicians and had himself published a version of The Art of Fugue. Calcott corresponded with Kollmann about the musical theories of the Bach school. In 1798, he was one of the founding members of the Concentores Society, a club with a limited membership of twelve professional musicians, dedicated to composition in counterpoint and the stile antico.

== 19th century ==
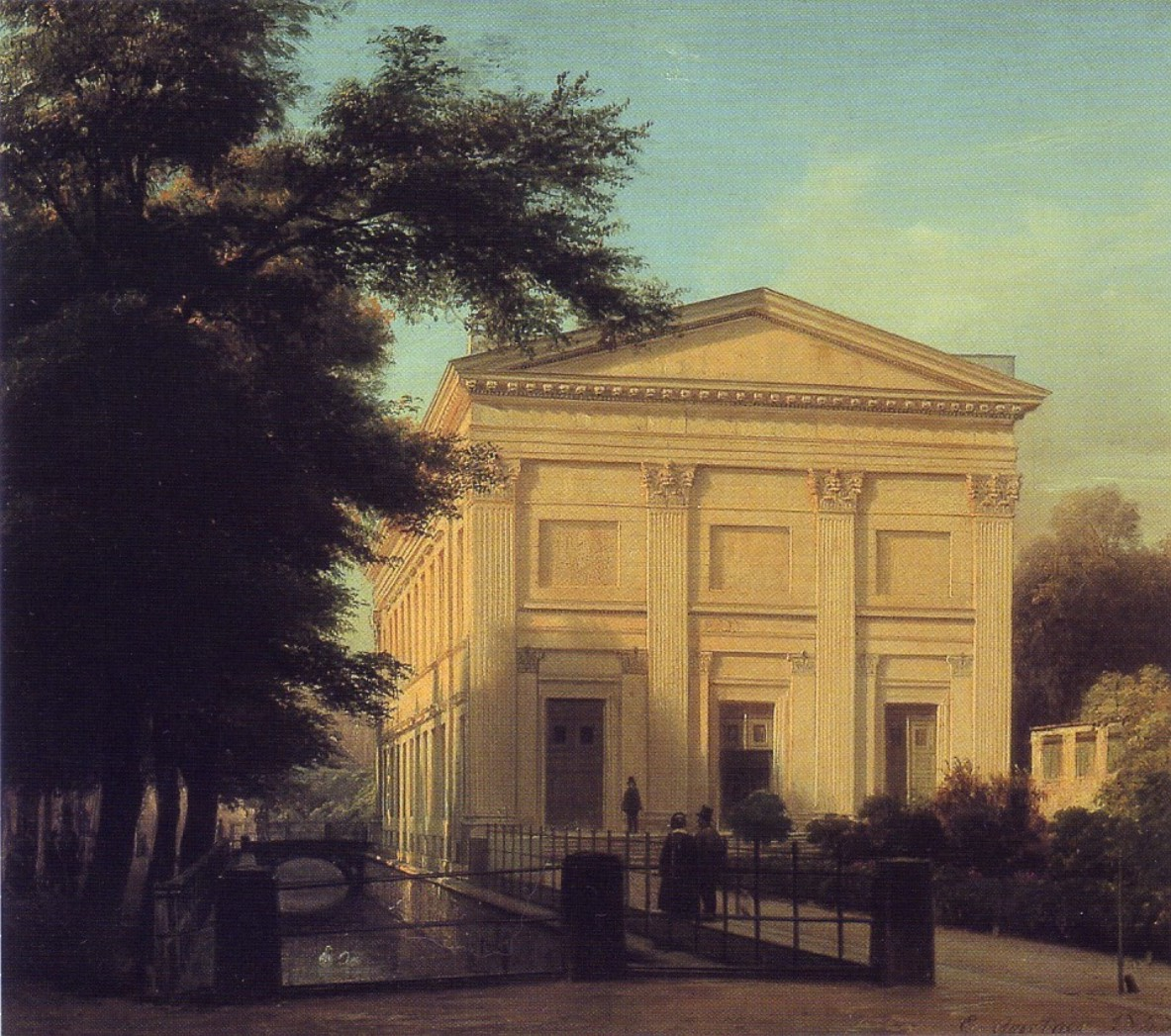
Sing-Akademie in 1843

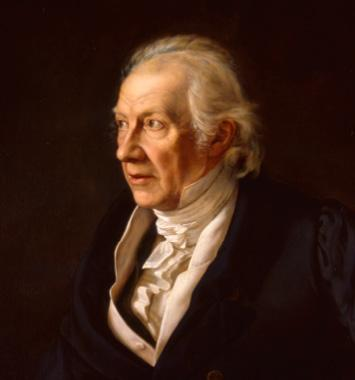
Carl Friedrich Zelter

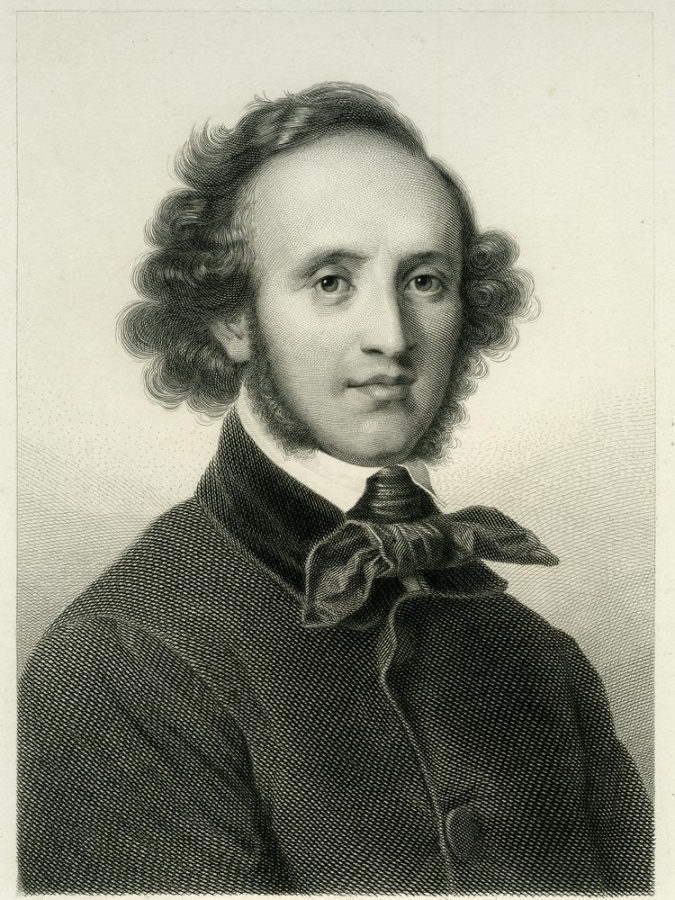
Felix Mendelssohn

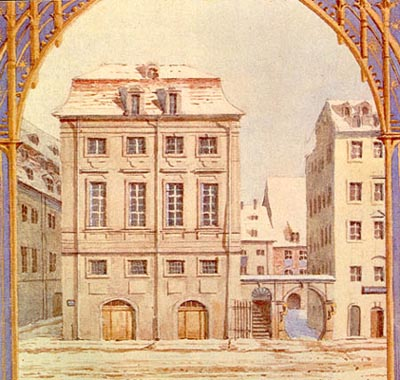
Felix Mendelssohn, 1836: watercolour of the Gewandhaus

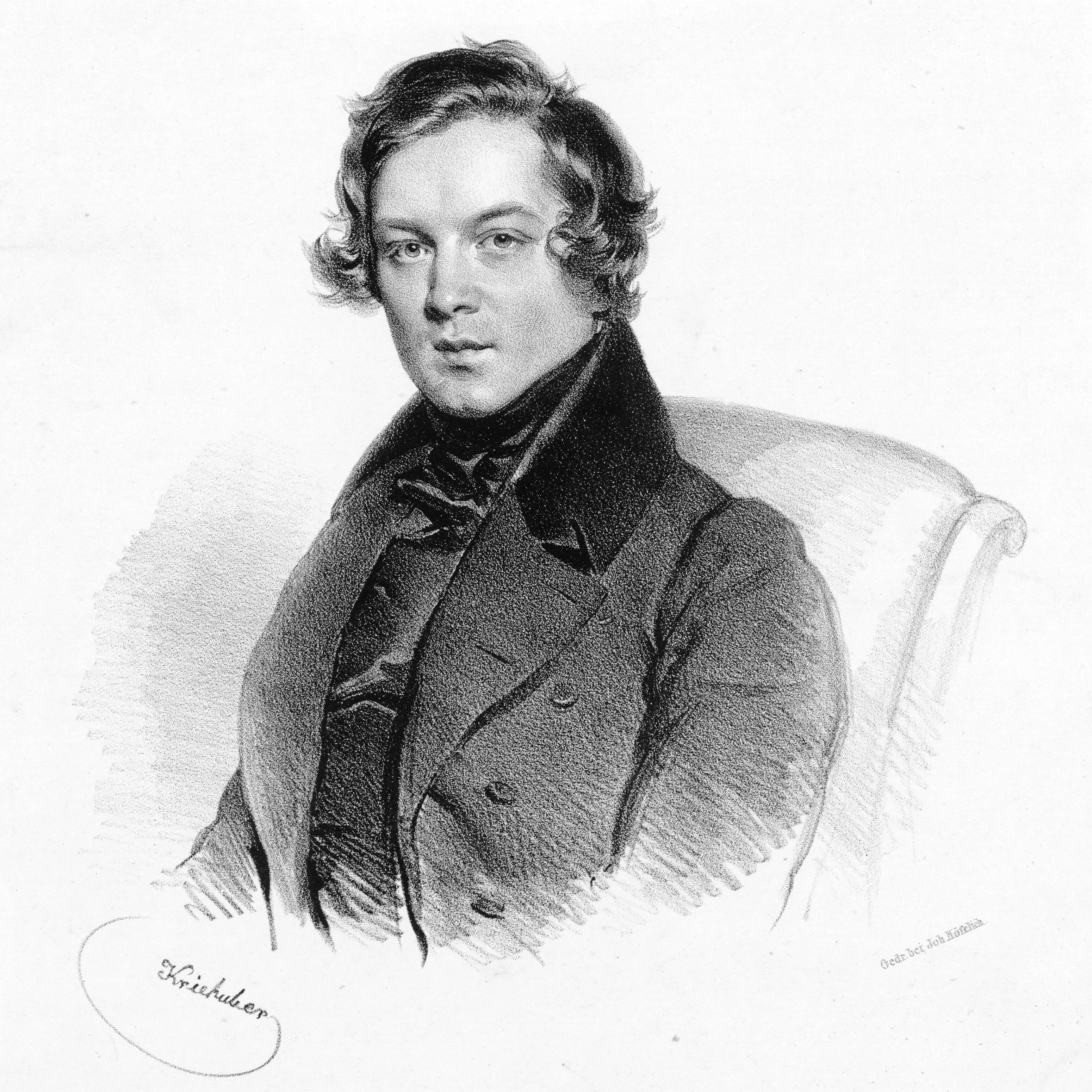
Robert Schumann

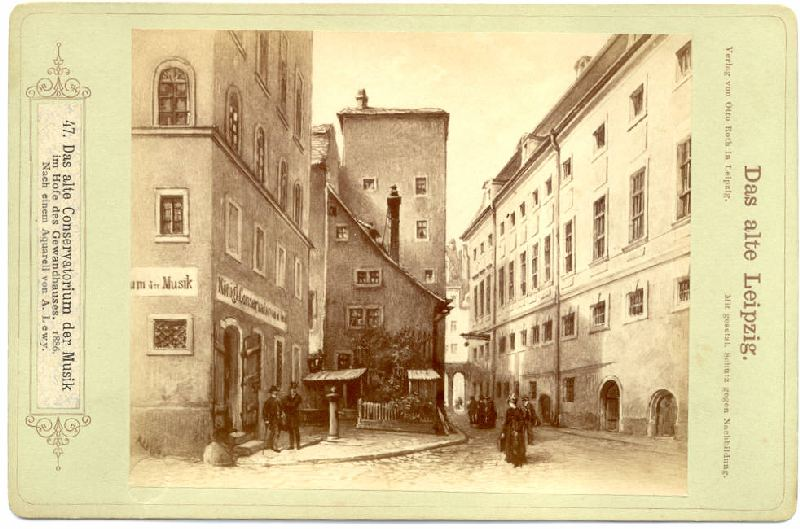
Original Leipzig Conservatory in the courtyard of the Gewandhaus

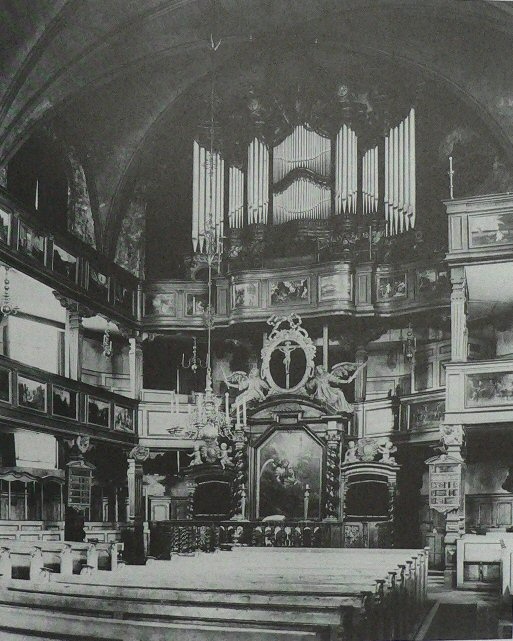
Organ in the Katharinenkirche, Frankfurt in 1900

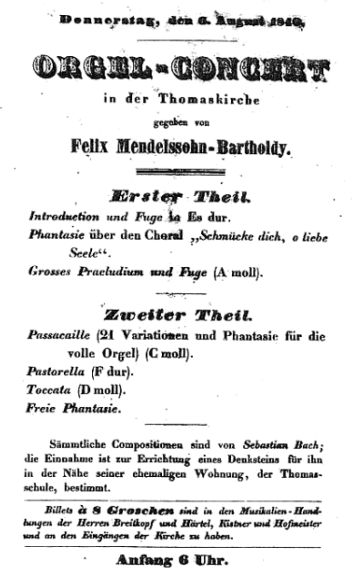
Programme for Mendelssohn's concert in the Thomaskirche In August 1840

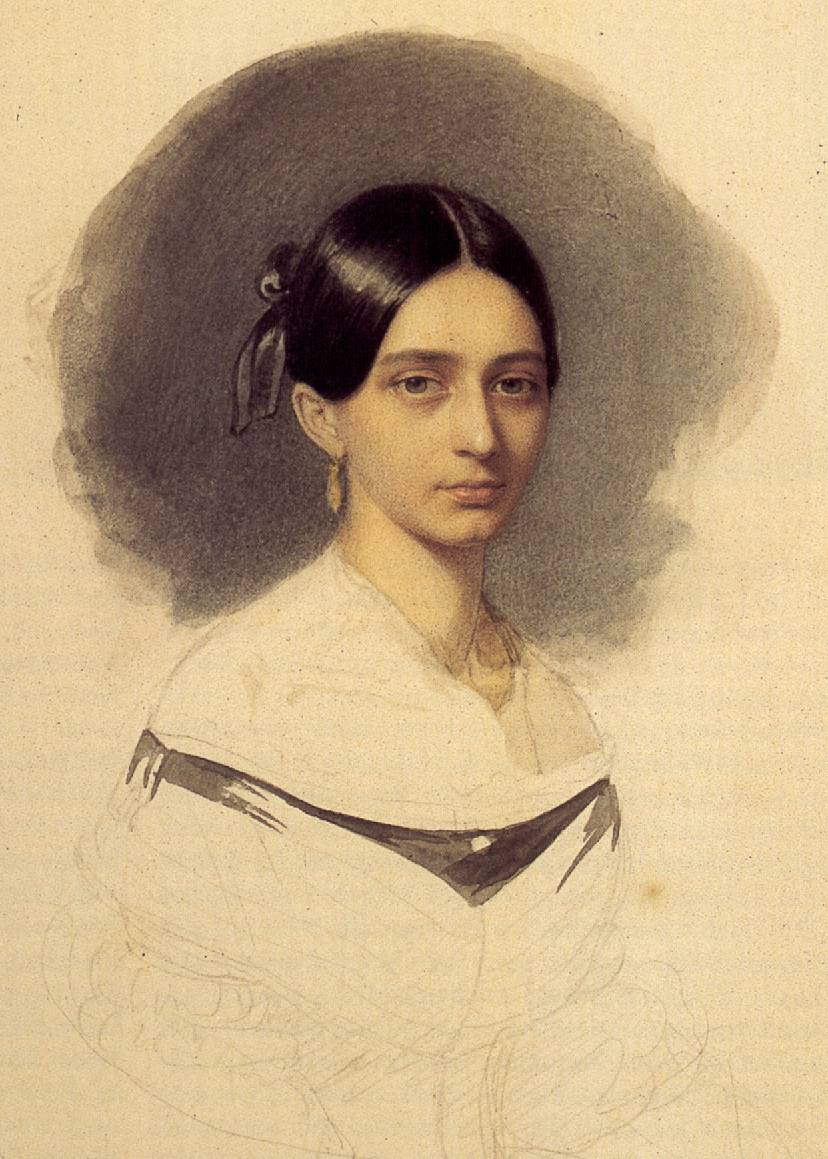
Clara Wieck

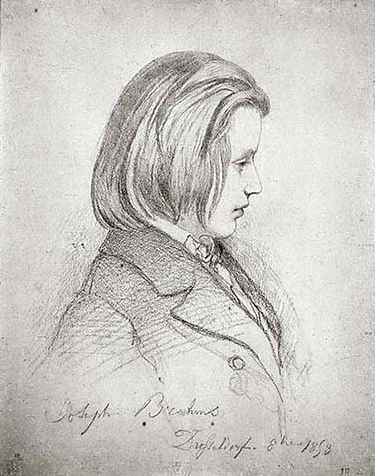
Johannes Brahms at the age of 20 in a drawing made in 1853 at Schumann's home in Düsseldorf by the French organist-artist Jean-Joseph Bonaventure Laurens

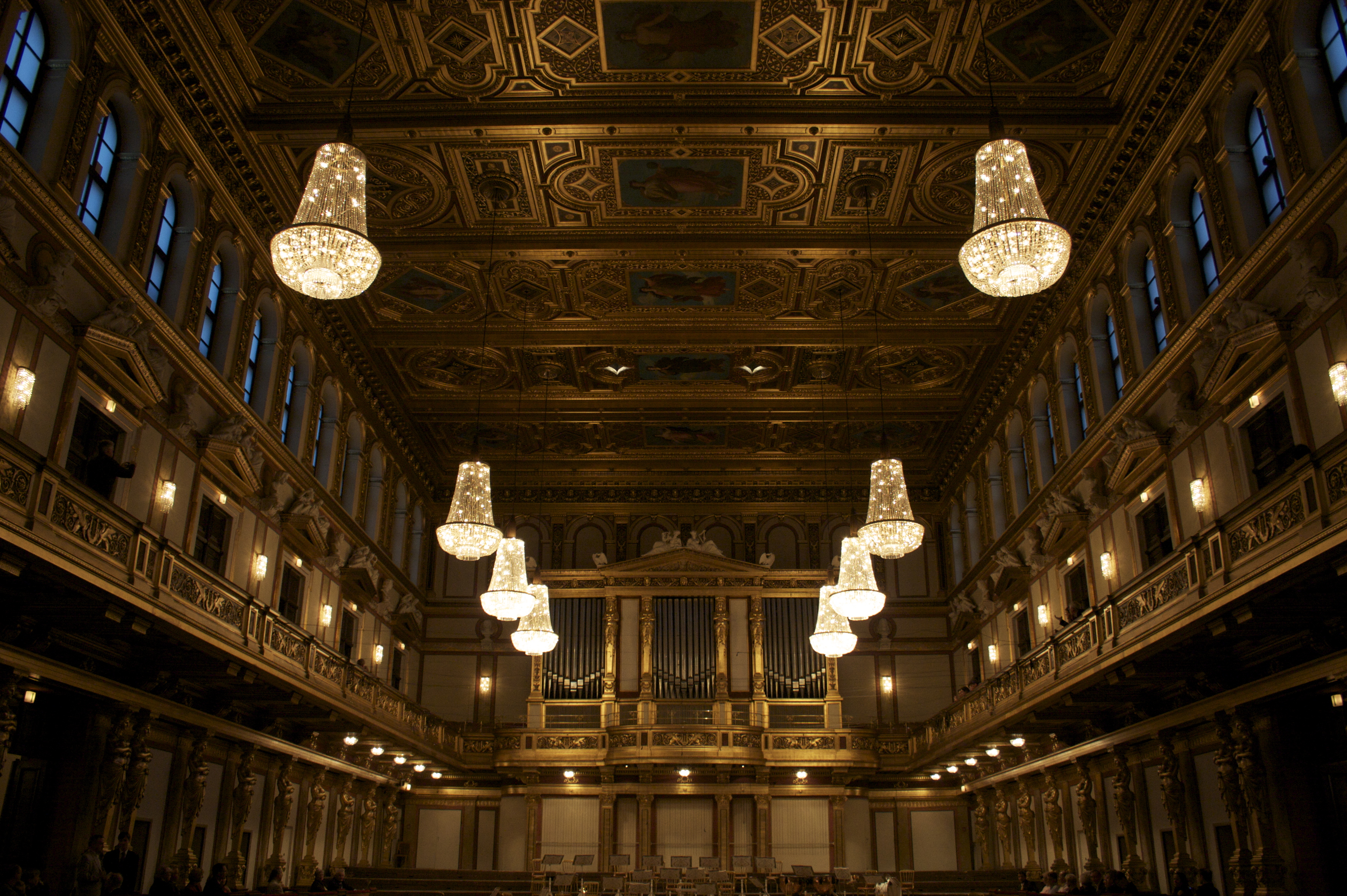
Musikverein in Vienna

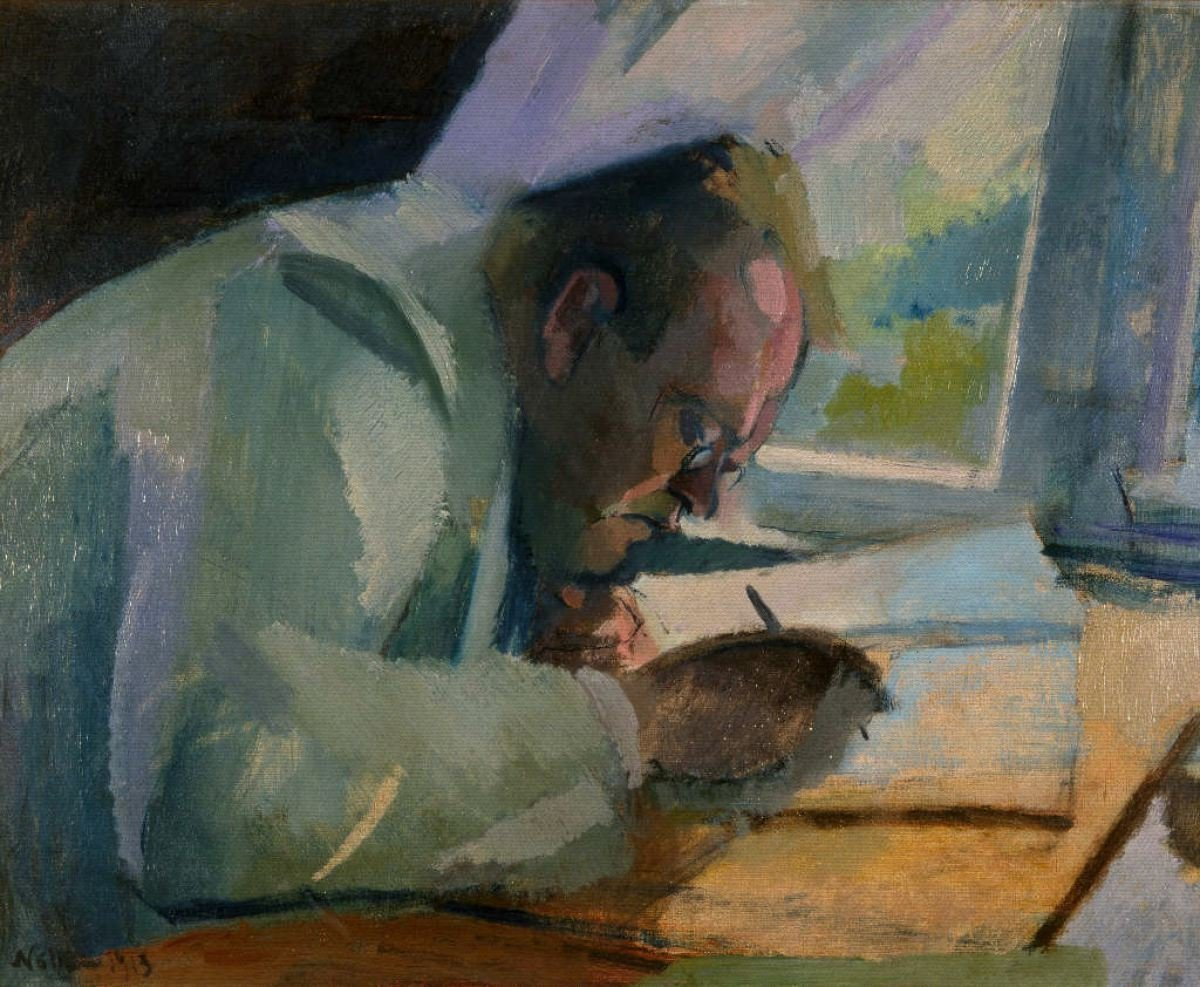
Max Reger

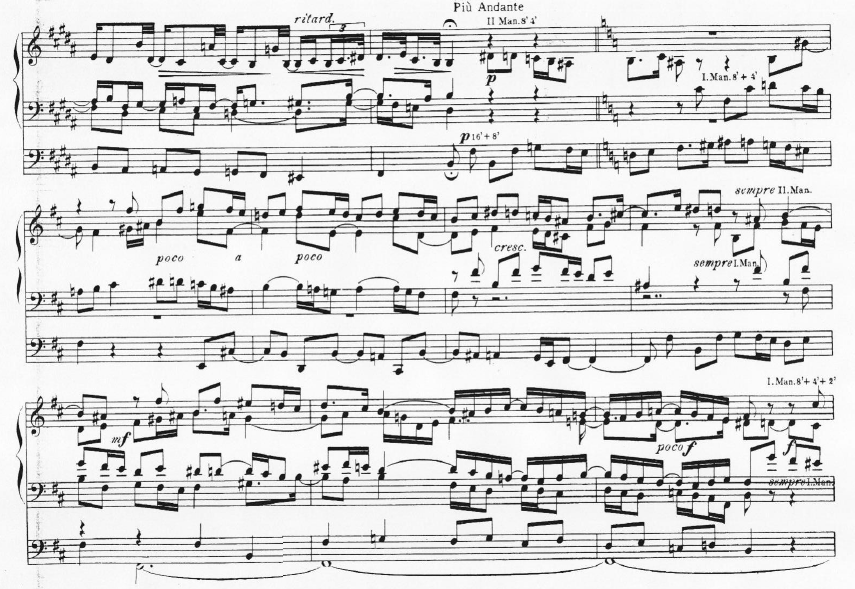
Central section of the adagio from Reger's first suite for organ, Op. 16 (1896)

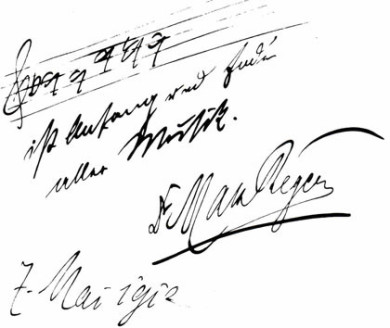
"b-a-c-h is beginning and end of all music" (Max Reger 1912)

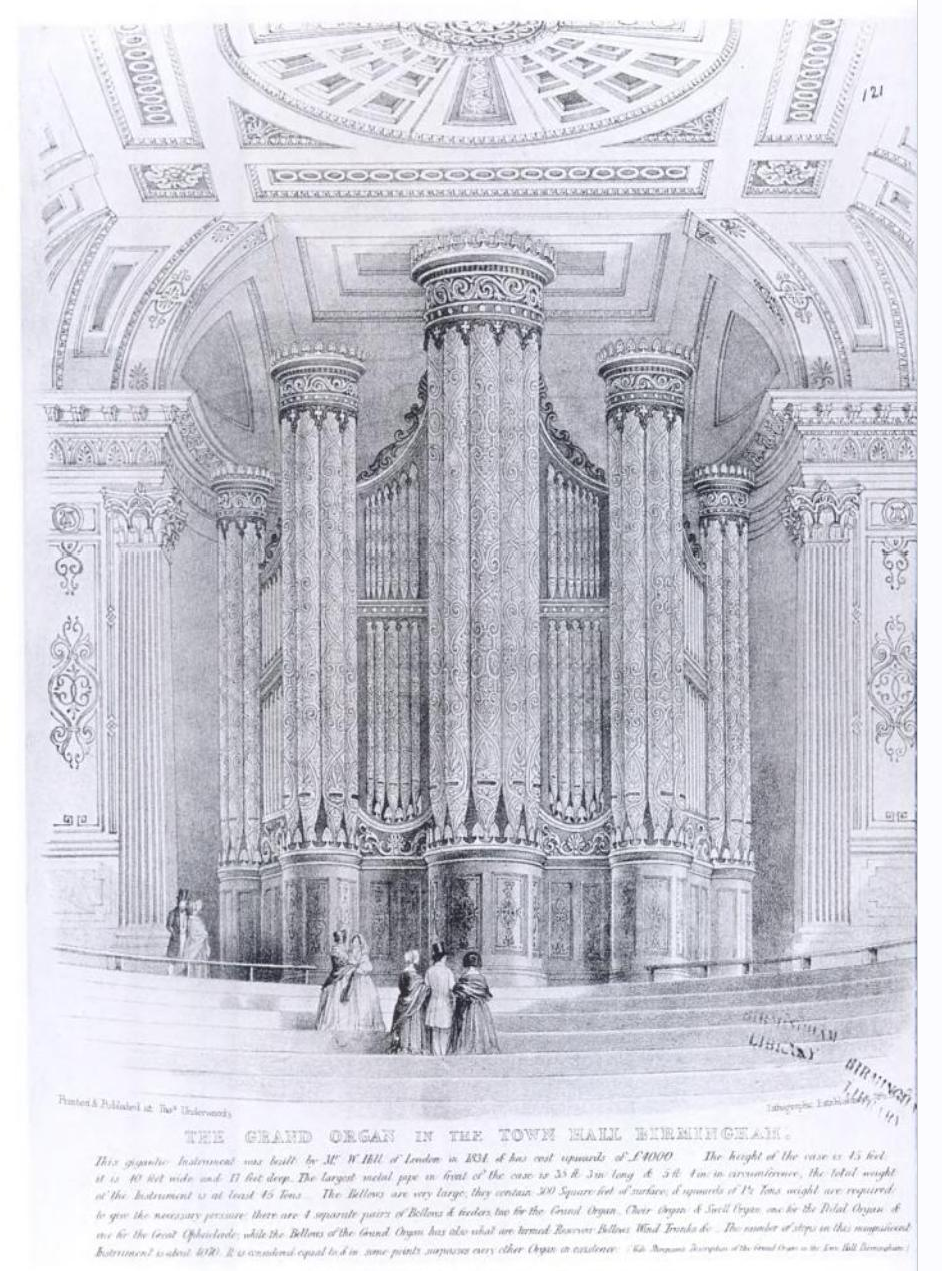
Organ in Birmingham Town Hall constructed in 1834

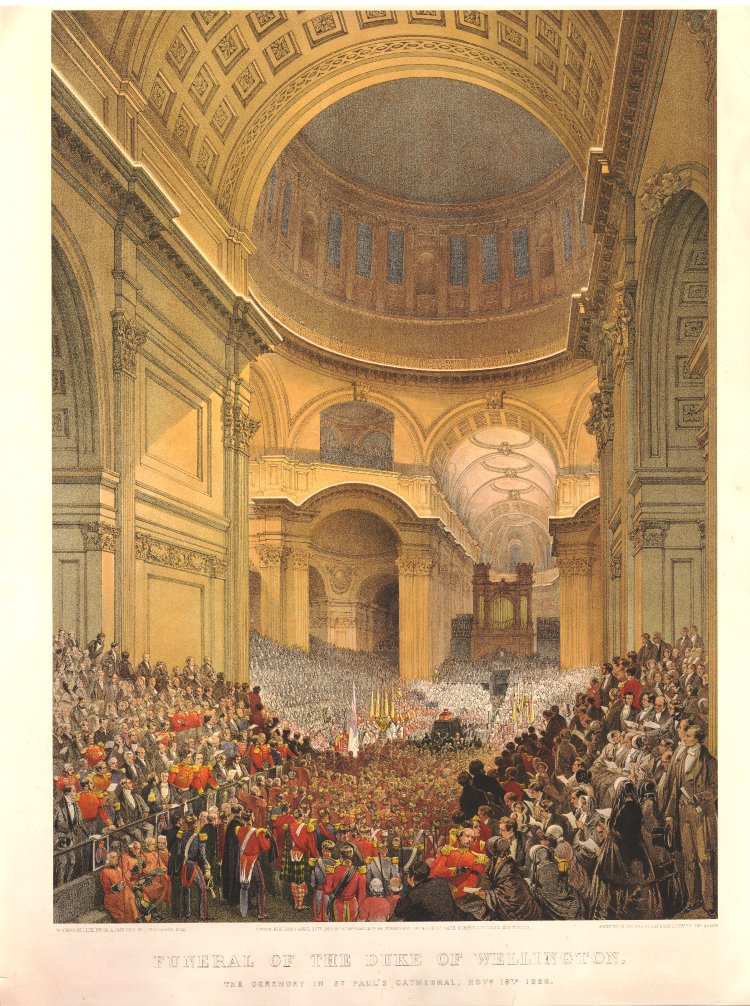
Funeral of the Duke of Wellington in St Paul's Cathedral, 1852, with the Father Smith organ in the background

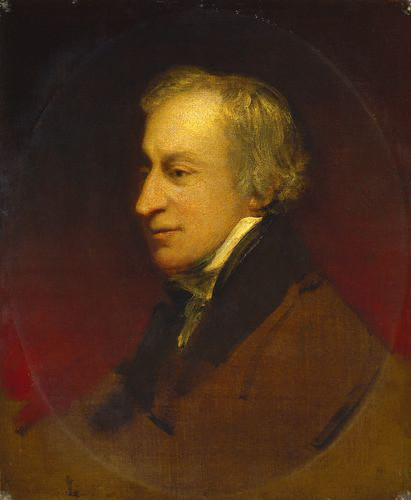
Samuel Wesley

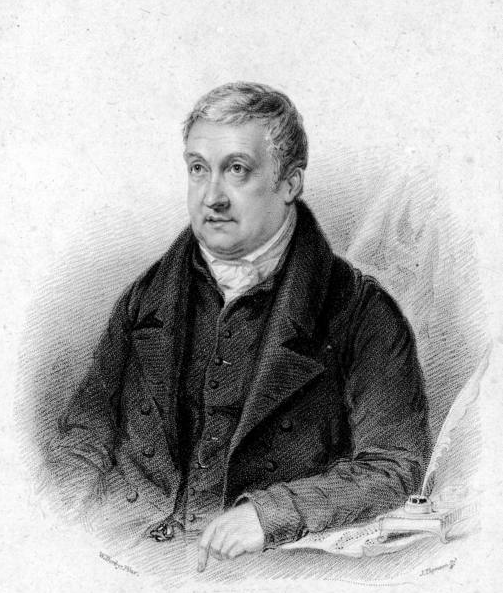
William Crotch

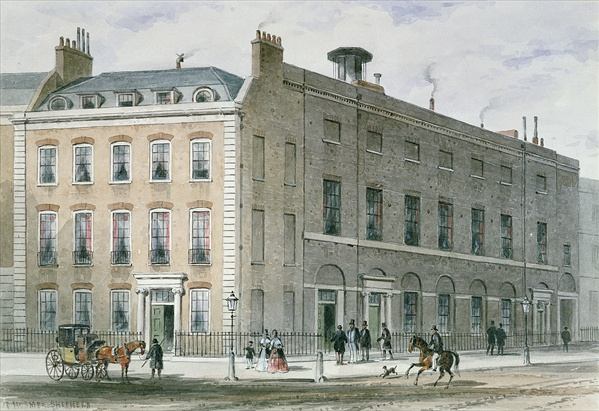
Thomas Hosmer Shepherd, 1830: Hanover Square Rooms

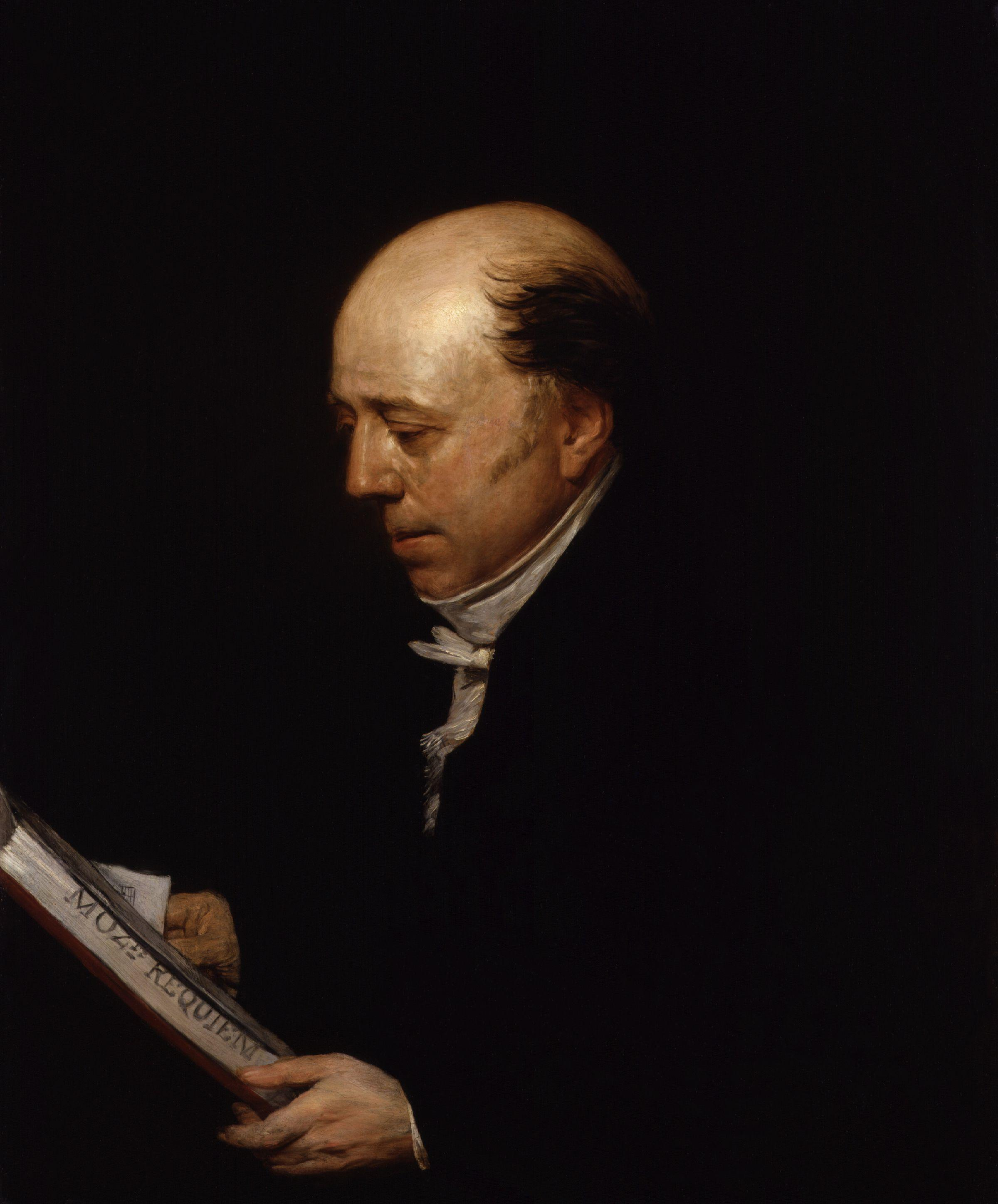
Vincent Novello

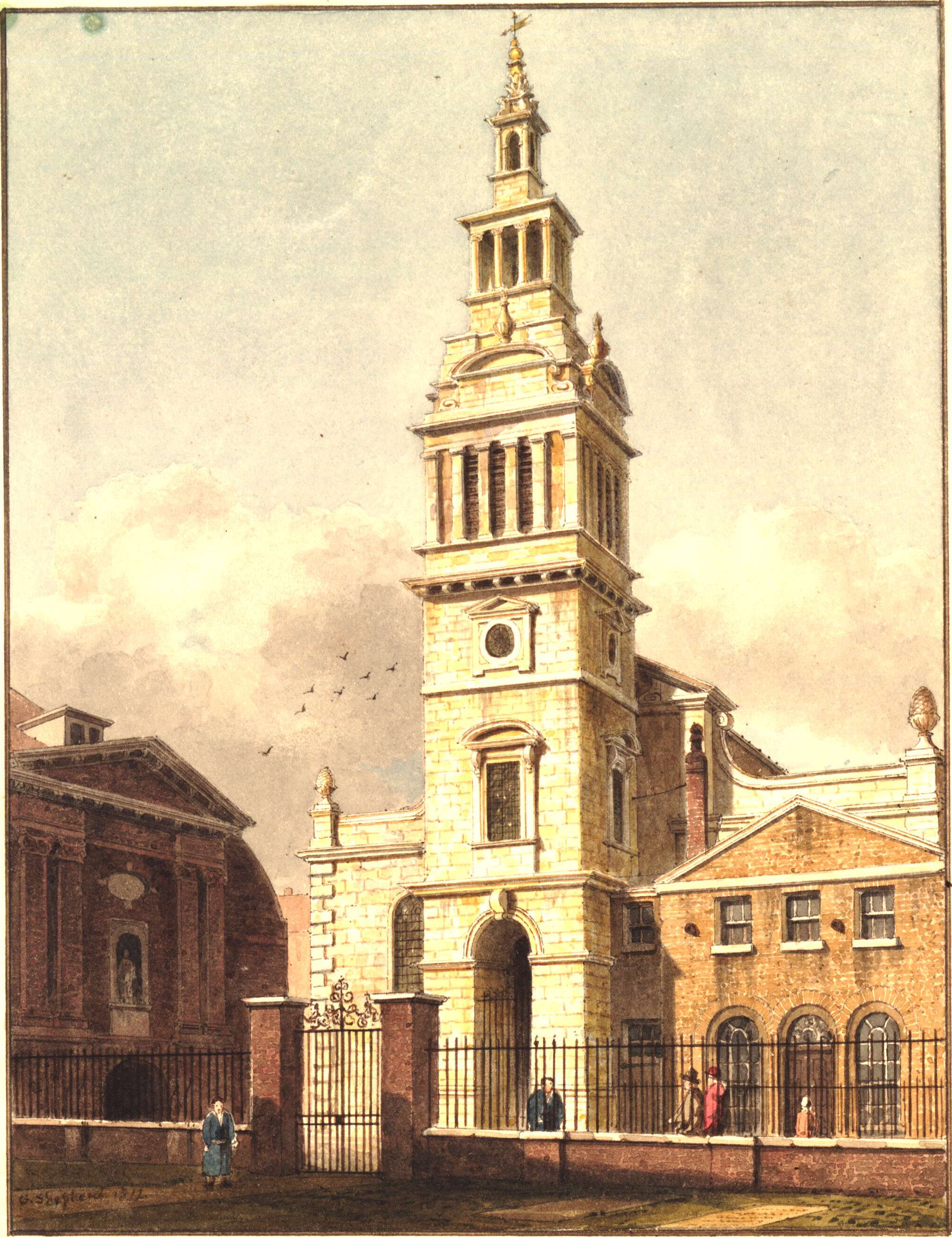
George Shepherd, 1812: Watercolour of Christ Church, Newgate, designed by Christopher Wren

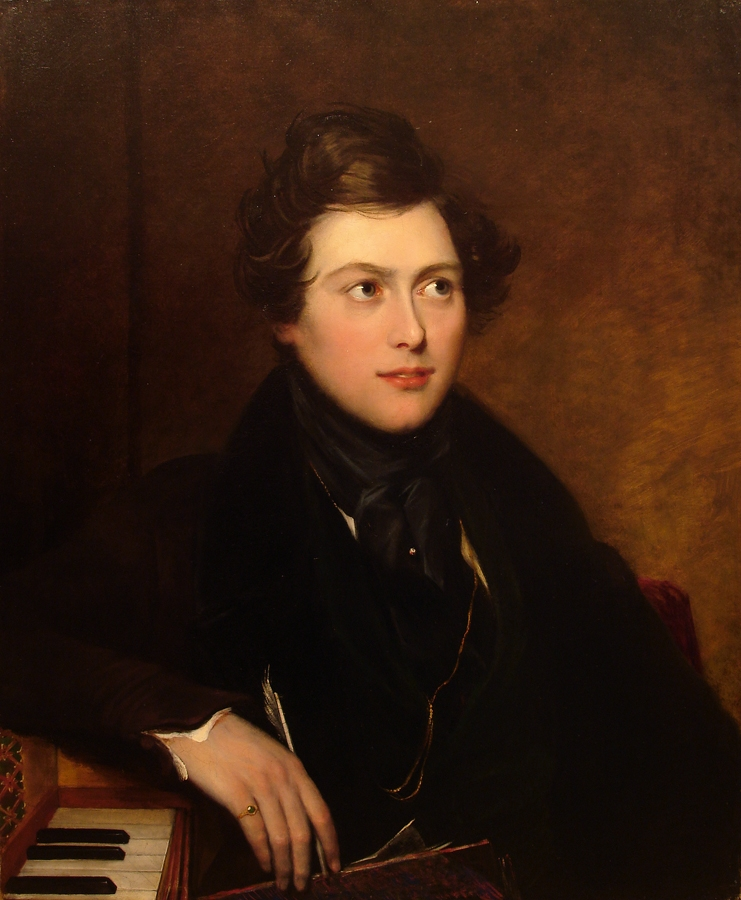
W. Sterndale Bennett

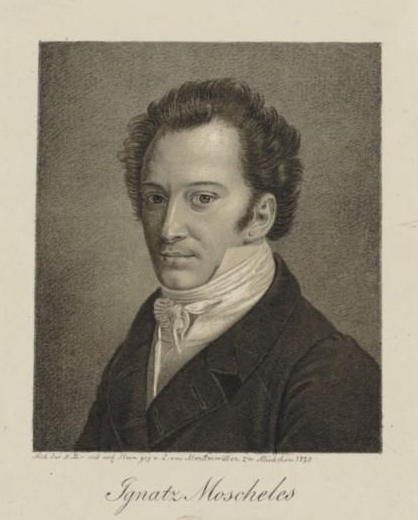
Ignaz Moscheles

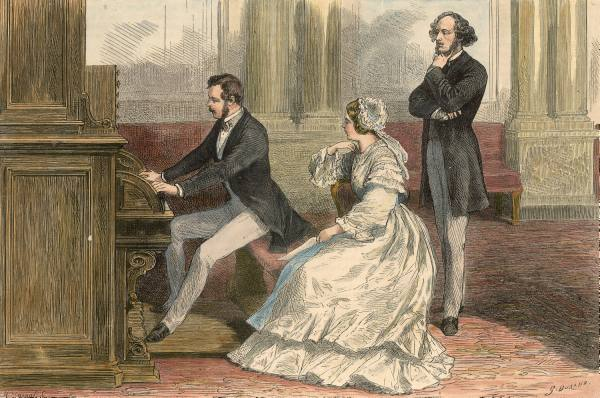
G. Durand, 1842: engraving of Prince Albert playing the organ in the Old Library in Buckingham Palace in the presence of Queen Victoria and Felix Mendelssohn

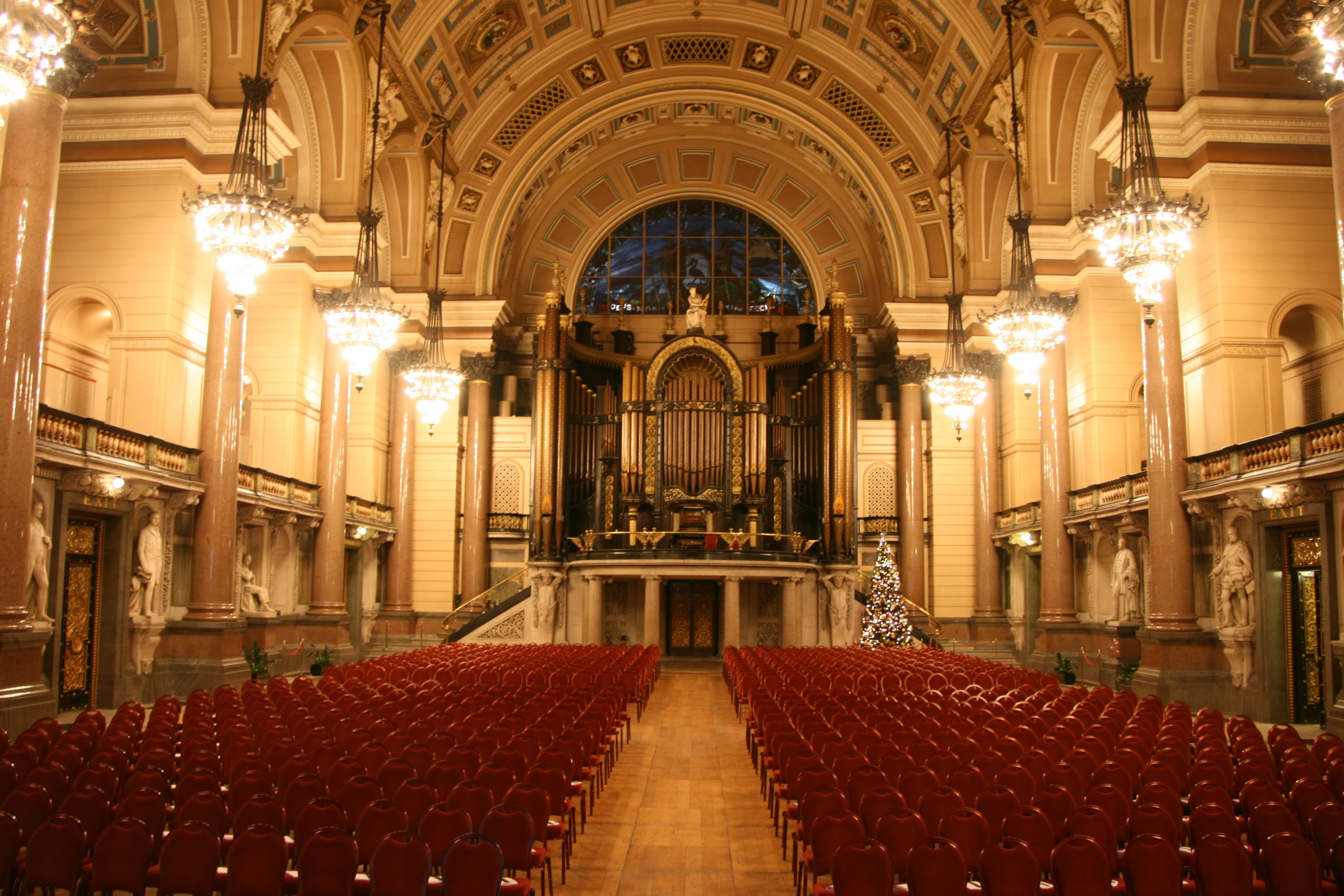
St. George's Hall, Liverpool, with organ built by Henry Willis in 1855

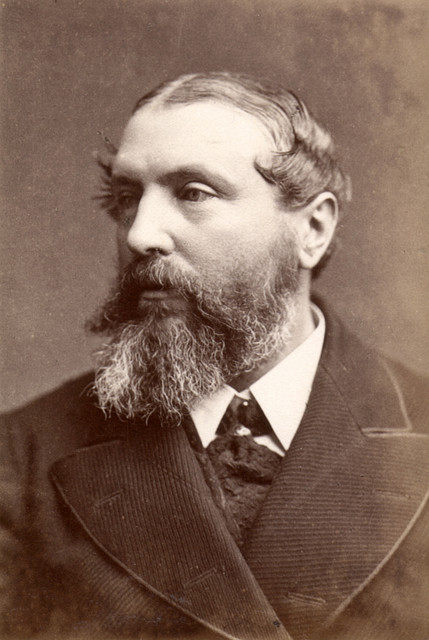
William Thomas Best (1826–1897)

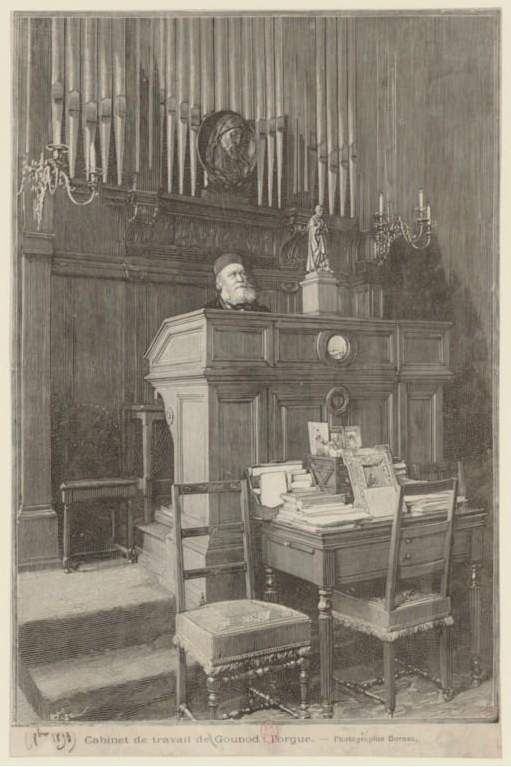
Charles Gounod in his studio in 1893, playing his Cavaillé-Coll organ

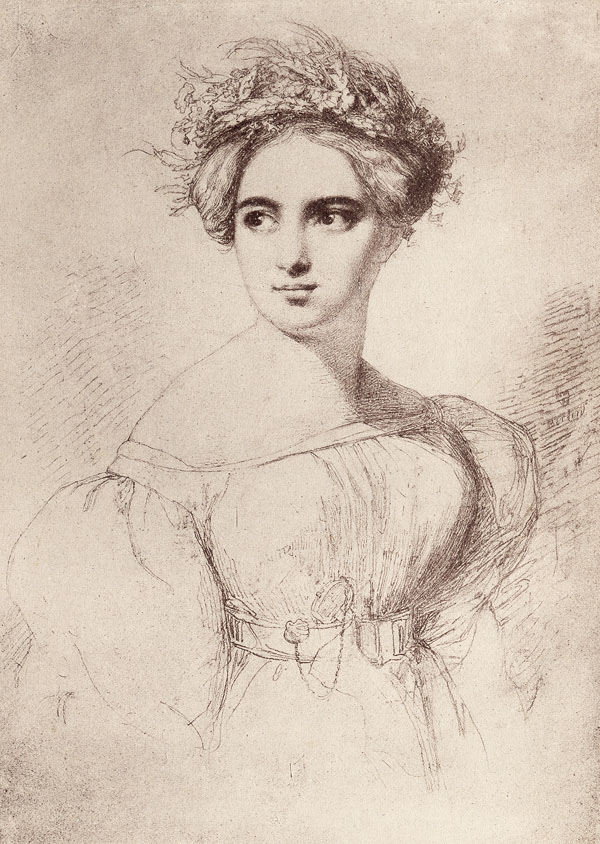
Fanny Mendelssohn in a drawing by her future husband Wilhelm Hensel

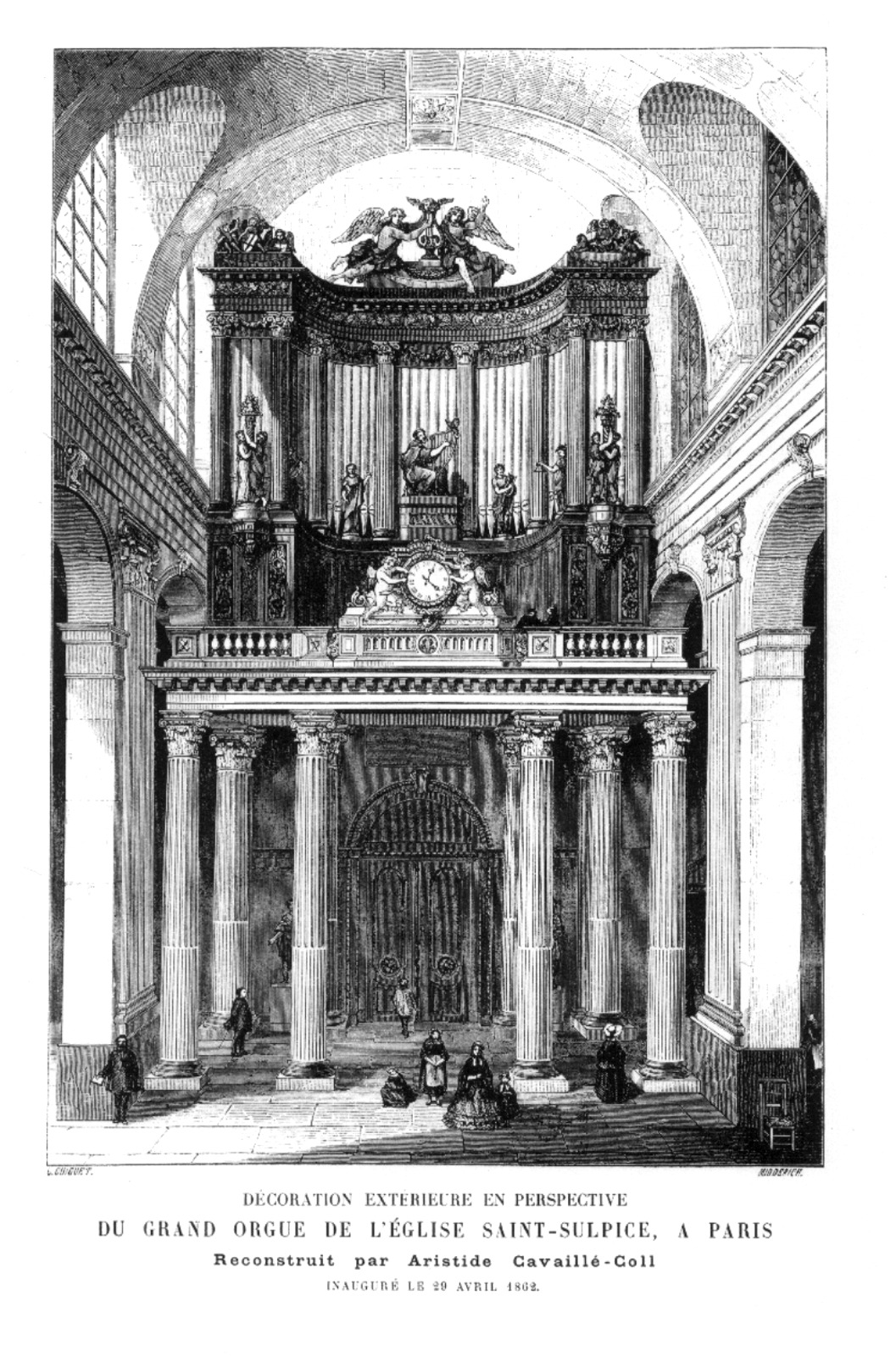
Engraving of the Cavaillé-Coll organ in St. Sulpice, Paris

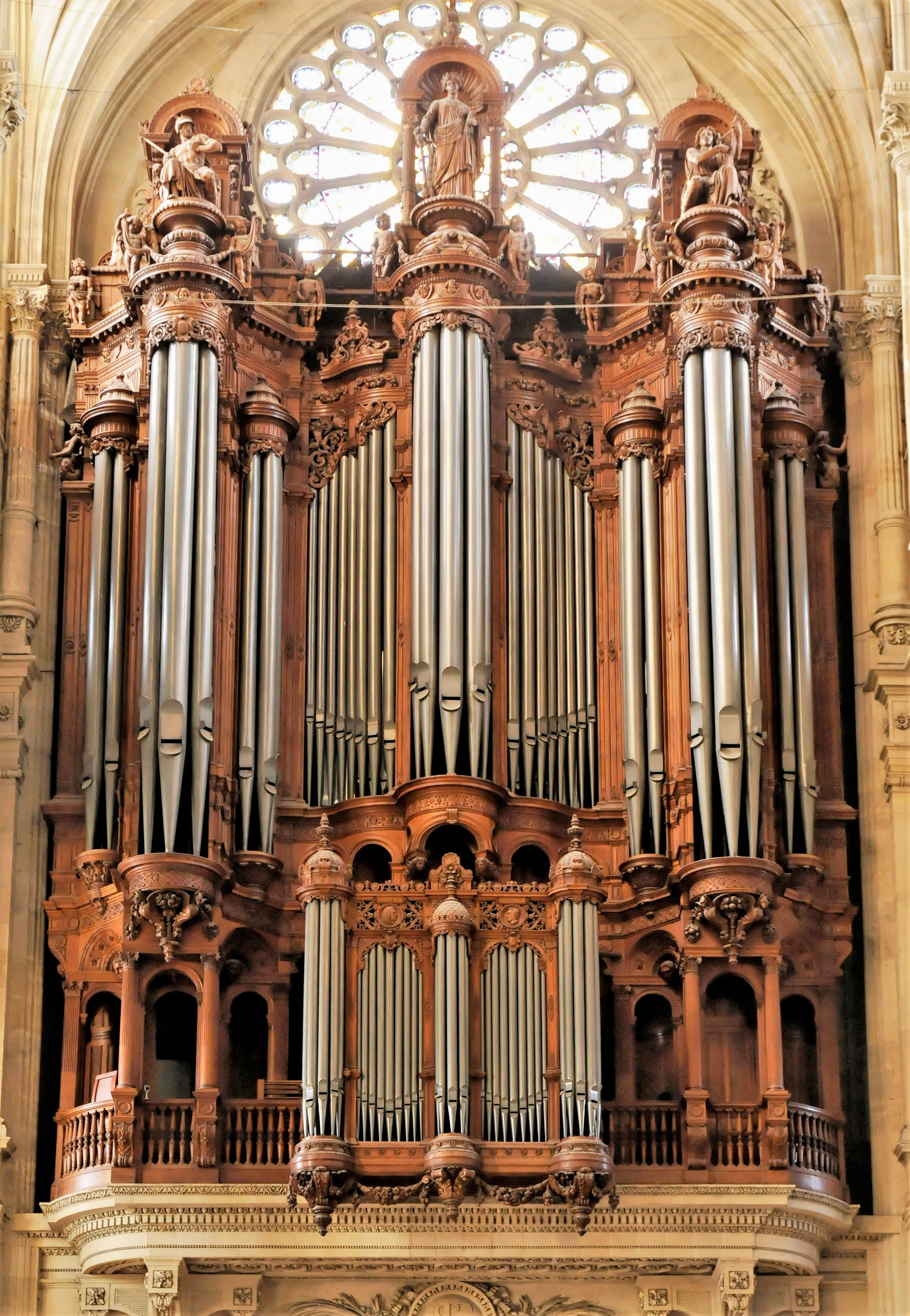
Organ at St Eustache, rebuilt in 1989 in the original case designed by Victor Baltard

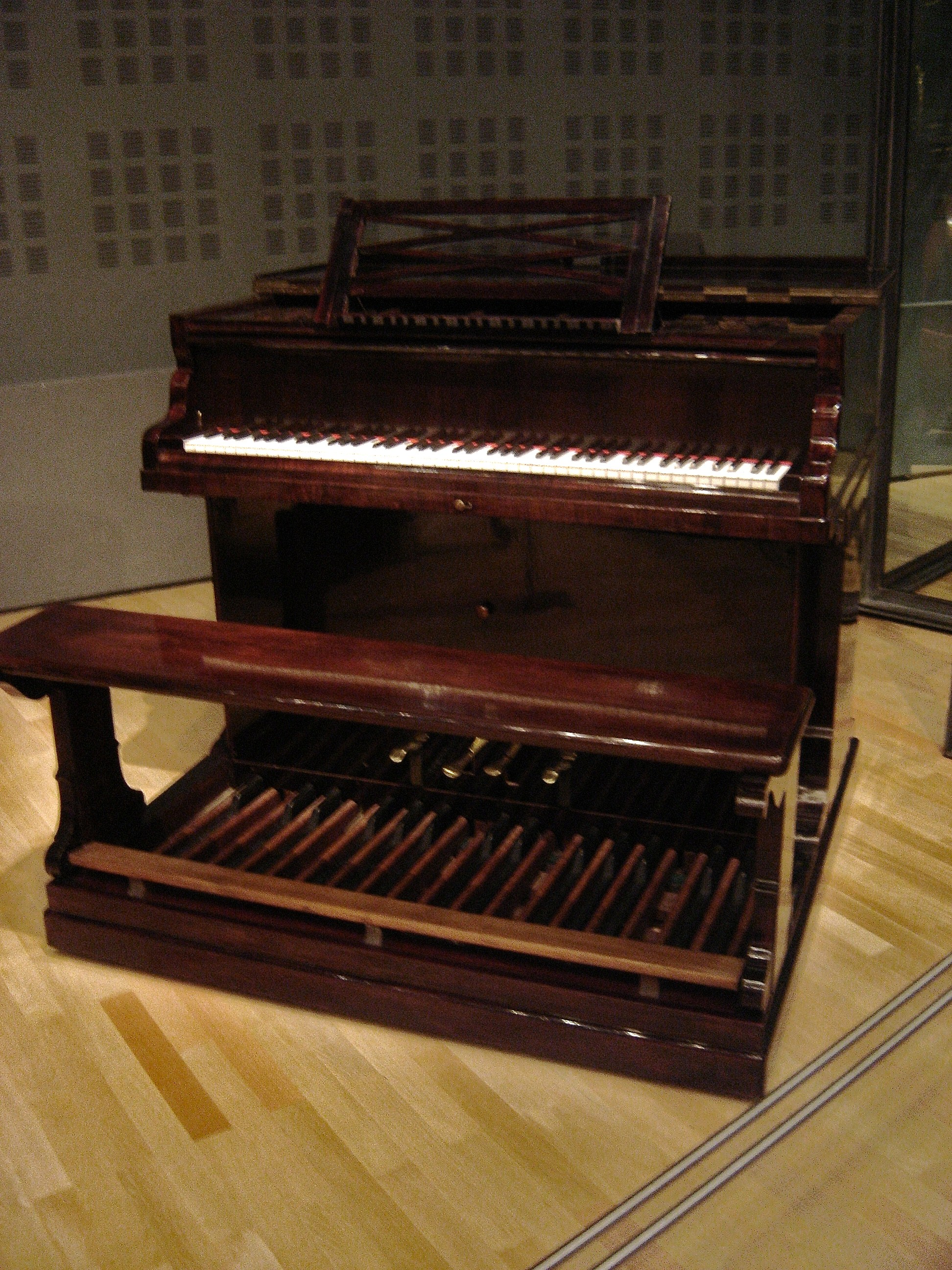
Érard pedal piano

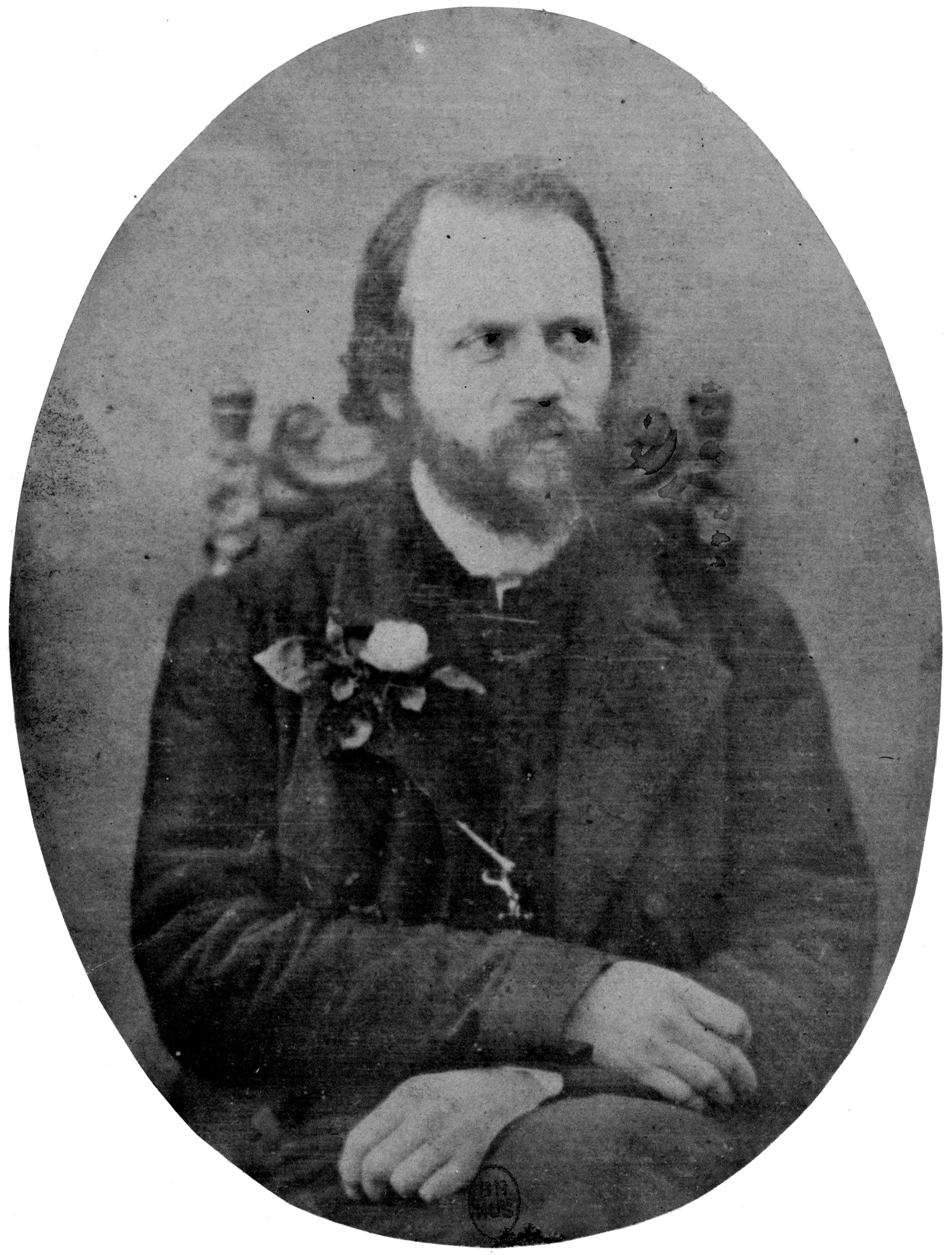
Charles-Valentin Alkan

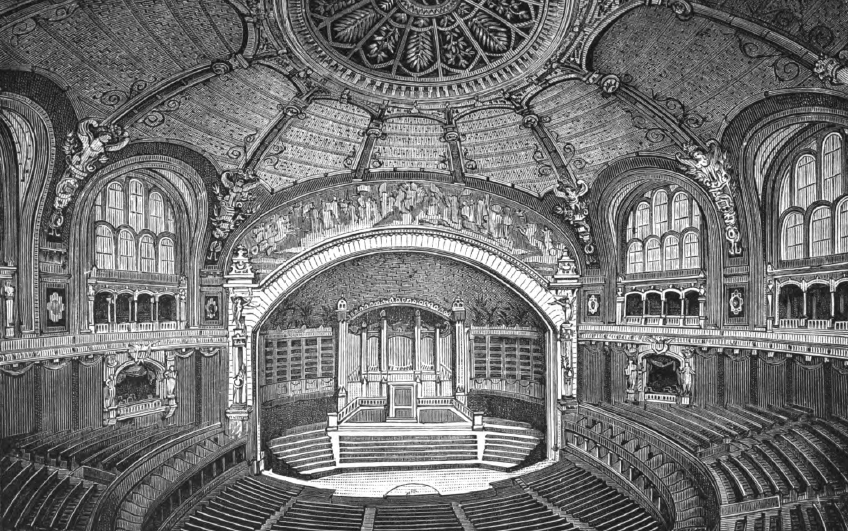
Cavaillé-Colle organ in the Salle des Fêtes of the Palais du Trocadéro, built in 1878

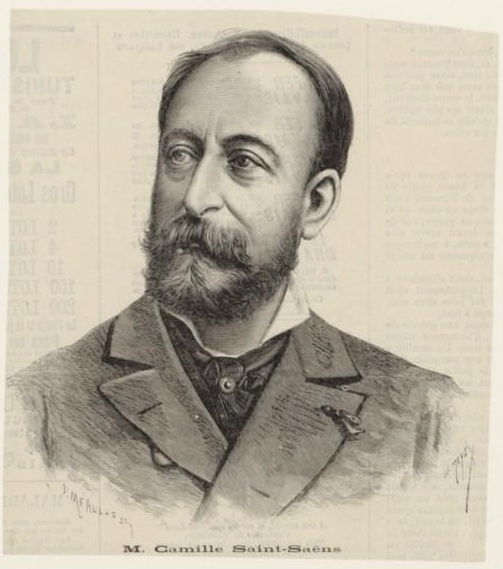
Camille Saint-Saëns

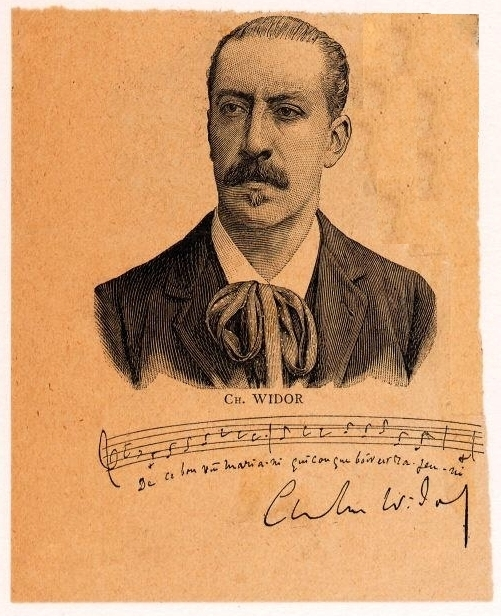
Charles-Marie Widor

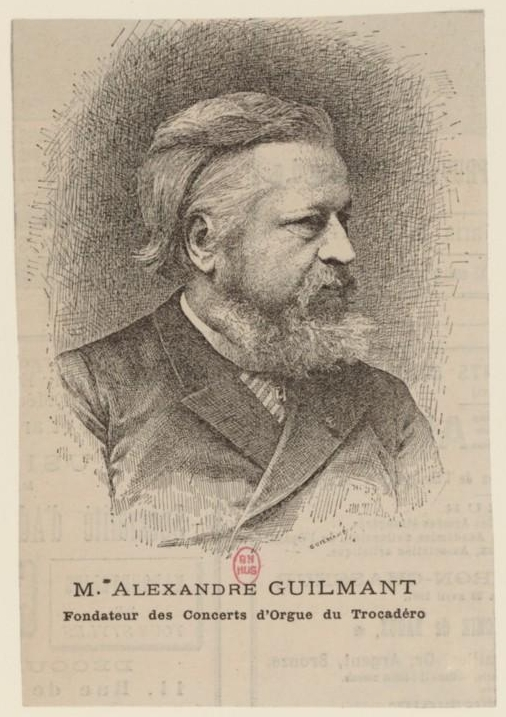
Alexandre Guilmant

Marcel Dupré at his home in Meudon in front of the Cavaillé-Coll organ previously owned by Guilmant

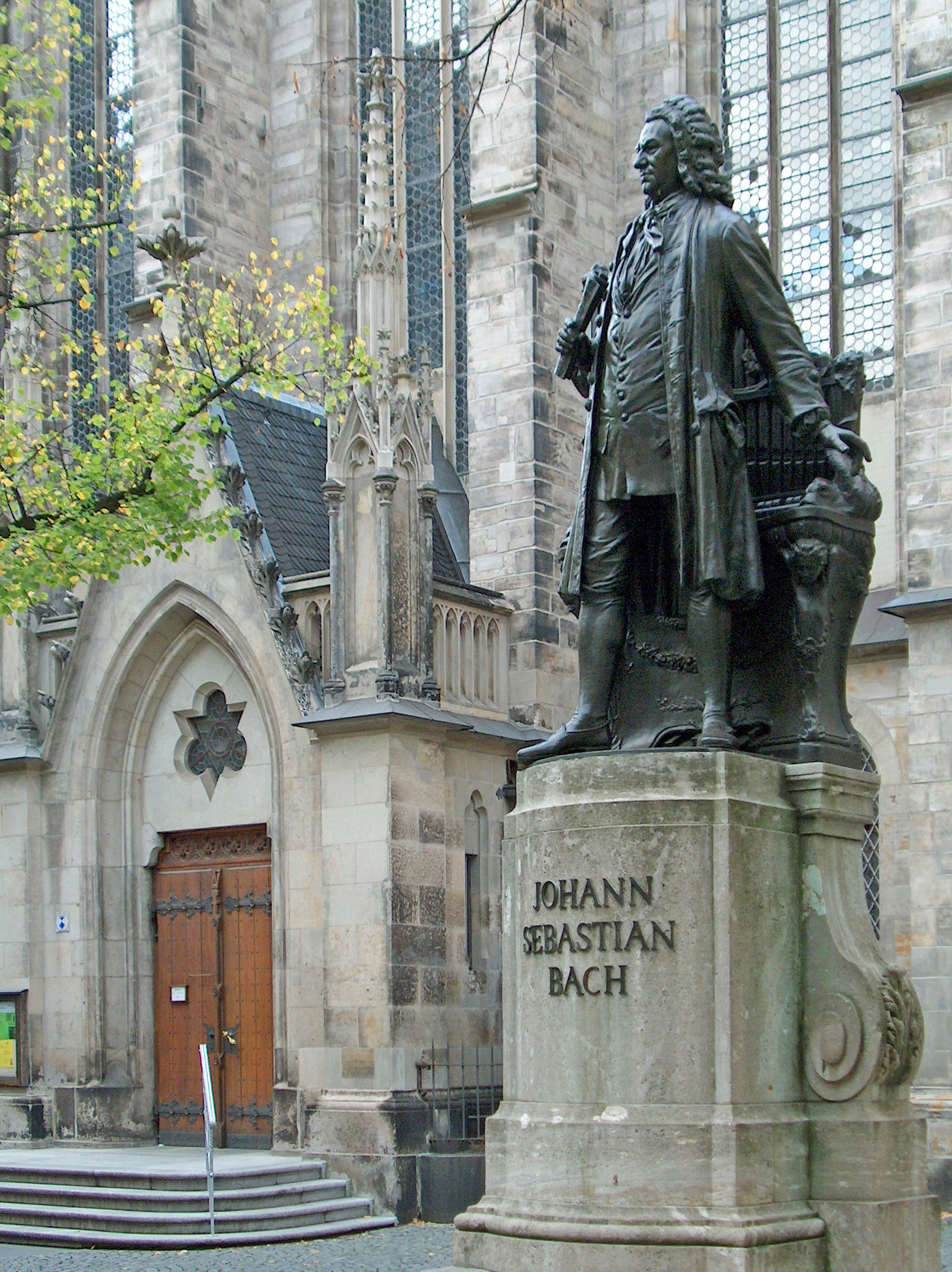
1908 Statue of Bach in front of the Thomaskirche in Leipzig

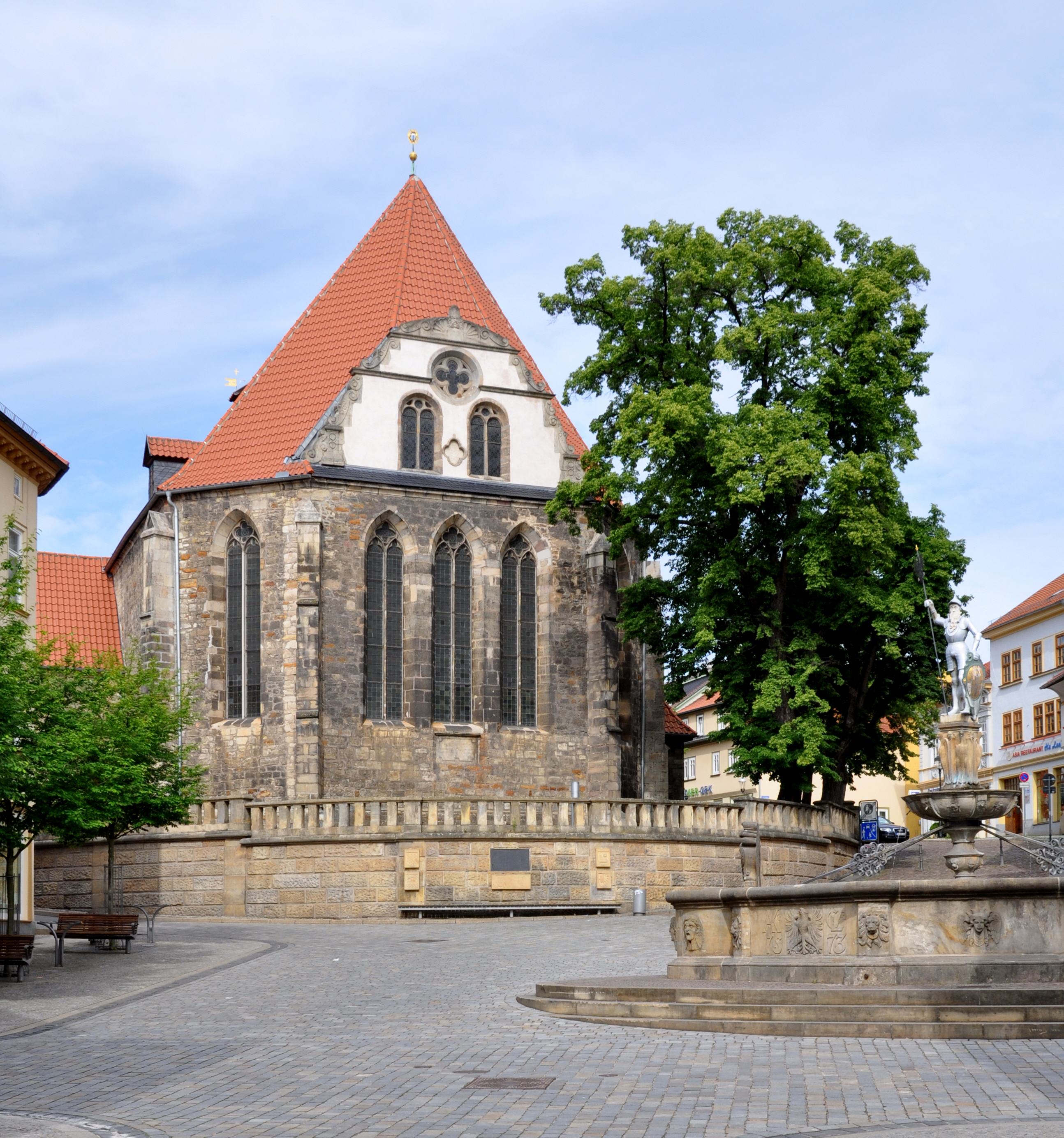
The church in Arnstadt where Bach had been the organist from 1703 to 1707. In 1935 the church was renamed to "Bachkirche".

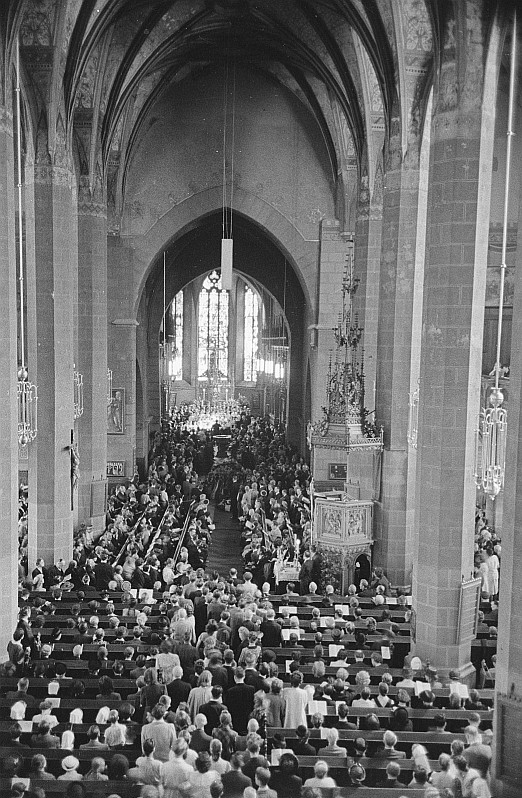
28 July 1950: memorial service for Bach in Leipzig's Thomaskirche, on the 200th anniversary of the composer's death

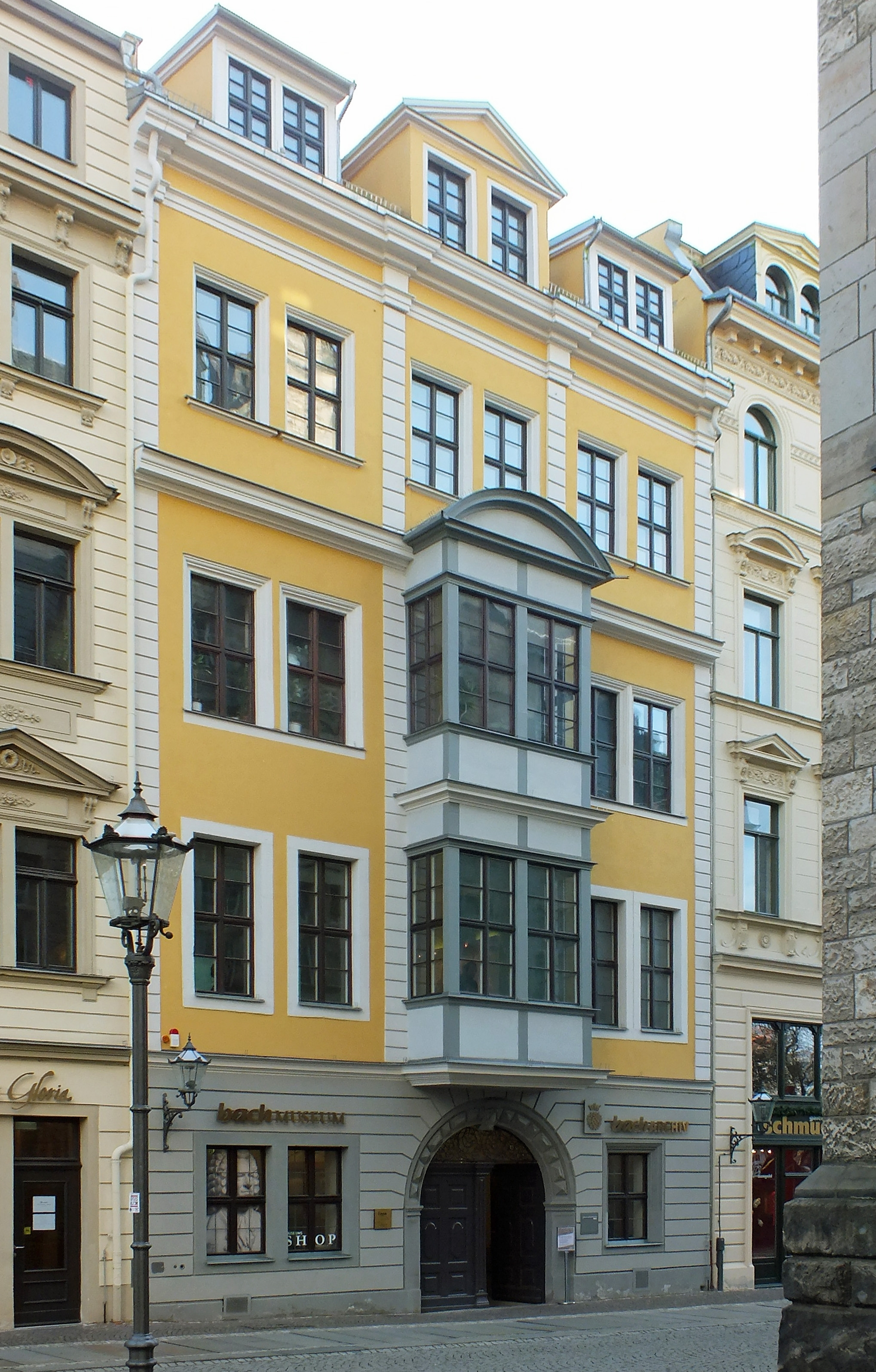
Bosehaus in Leipzig where the Bach Archive has been housed since 1985

In 1802, Johann Nikolaus Forkel published Ueber Johann Sebastian Bachs Leben, Kunst und Kunstwerke, the first biography of the composer, which contributed to his becoming known to a wider public. In 1805, Abraham Mendelssohn, who had married one of Itzig's granddaughters, bought a substantial collection of Bach manuscripts that had come down from C. P. E. Bach, and donated it to the Berlin Sing-Akademie. The Sing-Akademie occasionally performed Bach's works in public concerts, for instance his first keyboard concerto, with Sara Levy at the piano.

The first decades of the 19th century saw an increasing number of first publications of Bach's music: Breitkopf started publishing chorale preludes, Hoffmeister harpsichord music, and the Well-Tempered Clavier was printed concurrently by Simrock (Germany), Nägeli (Switzerland) and Hoffmeister (Germany and Austria) in 1801. Vocal music was also published: motets in 1802 and 1803, followed by the E♭ major version of the Magnificat, the Kyrie-Gloria Mass in A major, and the cantata Ein feste Burg ist unser Gott (BWV 80). In 1818, Hans Georg Nägeli called the Mass in B minor the greatest composition ever. Bach's influence was felt in the next generation of early Romantic composers. When Felix Mendelssohn, Abraham's son, aged 13, produced his first Magnificat setting in 1822, it is clear that he was inspired by the then unpublished D major version of Bach's Magnificat.

Felix Mendelssohn significantly contributed to the renewed interest in Bach's work with his 1829 Berlin performance of the St Matthew Passion, which was instrumental in setting off what has been called the Bach Revival. The St John Passion saw its 19th-century premiere in 1833, and the first performance of the Mass in B minor followed in 1844. Besides these and other public performances and an increased coverage on the composer and his compositions in printed media, the 1830s and 1840s also saw the first publication of more vocal works by Bach: six cantatas, the St Matthew Passion, and the Mass in B minor. A series of organ compositions saw their first publication in 1833. Chopin started composing his 24 Preludes, Op. 28, inspired by the Well-Tempered Clavier, in 1835, and Schumann published his Sechs Fugen über den Namen BACH in 1845. Bach's music was transcribed and arranged to suit contemporary tastes and performance practice by composers such as Carl Friedrich Zelter, Robert Franz, and Franz Liszt, or combined with new music such as the melody line of Charles Gounod's Ave Maria. Brahms, Bruckner, and Wagner were among the composers who promoted Bach's music or wrote glowingly about it.

In 1850, the Bach-Gesellschaft (Bach Society) was founded to promote Bach's music. In the second half of the 19th century, the Society published a comprehensive edition of the composer's works. Also in the second half of the 19th century, Philipp Spitta published Johann Sebastian Bach, the standard work on Bach's life and music. By that time, Bach was known as the first of the three Bs in music. Throughout the 19th century, 200 books were published on Bach. By the end of the century, local Bach societies were established in several cities, and his music had been performed in all major musical centres.

In Germany all throughout the century, Bach was coupled to nationalist feelings, and the composer was inscribed in a religious revival. In England, Bach was coupled to an existing revival of religious and baroque music. By the end of the century, Bach was firmly established as one of the greatest composers, recognised for both his instrumental and his vocal music.

=== Germany ===
But it is only at his organ that he appears to be at his most sublime, most audacious, in his own element. Here he knows neither limits nor goals and works for centuries to come.

— Robert Schumann, Neue Zeitschrift, 1839

A new printed "movable type" edition of Clavier-Übung III, omitting the duets BWV 802–805, was produced by Ambrosius Kühnel in 1804 for the Bureau de Musique in Leipzig, his joint publishing venture with Franz Anton Hoffmeister that later became the music publishing firm of C.F. Peters. Previously in 1802 Hoffmeister and Kühnel and had published a collection of Bach's keyboard music, including the Inventions and Sinfonias and both books of The Well-Tempered Clavier, with Johann Nikolaus Forkel acting as advisor. (The first prelude and fugue BWV 870 from The Well-Tempered Clavier II was published for the first time in 1799 by Kollmann in London. The whole of Book II was published in 1801 in Bonn by Simrock, followed by Book I; slightly later Nägeli came out with a third edition in Zürich.) Hoffmeister and Kühnel did not take up Forkel's suggestion of including in their fifteenth volume the four duets BWV 802–805, which were only published by Peters much later in 1840. Nine of the chorale preludes BWV 675–683 were printed in the four volume Breitkopf and Härtel collection of chorale preludes prepared between 1800 and 1806 by Johann Gottfried Schicht. Forkel and Kollmann corresponded during this period: they shared the same enthusiasm for Bach and the publication of his works. When Forkel's biography of Bach appeared in Germany in 1802, his publishers Hoffmeister and Kühnel wished to have control over translations into English and French. No complete authorized English translation was produced at the time. In 1812, Kollmann used parts of the biography in a long article on Bach in the Quarterly Musical Register; and an unauthorized anonymous English translation was published by Boosey & Company in 1820.

In Berlin, on the death of Fasch in 1800, his assistant Carl Friedrich Zelter took over as the director of the Sing-Akademie. The son of a mason, he himself had been brought up as a master mason, but had cultivated his musical interests in secret, eventually taking composition classes with Fasch. He had been linked to the Sing-Akademie for years and had acquired a reputation as one of the foremost experts on Bach in Berlin. In 1799, he started a correspondence with Goethe on the aesthetics of music, particularly the music of Bach, which was to last until both friends died in 1832. Although Goethe had a late training in music, he considered it an essential element in his life, arranging concerts at his home and attending them elsewhere. In 1819, Goethe described how the organist from Berka, Heinrich Friedrich Schütz, trained by Bach's student Kittel, would serenade him for hours with the music of the masters, from Bach to Beethoven, so that Goethe could acquaint himself with music from a historical perspective. In 1827, he wrote:

On this occasion I recalled the good organist of Berka; for it was there, in perfect repose without extraneous disturbance, that I first formed an impression of your great maestro. I said to myself, it is as if the eternal harmony were conversing with itself, as it may have done in God's breast before the creation of the world; that is the way it move deep within me, and it was if I neither possessed or needed ears, nor any other sense—least of all, the eyes.

Commenting in the same year on Bach's writing for the organ, Zelter wrote to Goethe:

The organ is Bach's own peculiar soul, into which he breathes immediately the living breath. His theme is the feeling just born, which, like the spark from the stone, invariably springs forth, from the first chance pressure of the foot upon the pedals. Thus by degrees he warms to his subject, till he has isolated himself, and feels alone, and then an inexhaustible stream passes out into the ocean.

Zelter insisted on the pedals as the key to Bach's organ writing: "One might say of old Bach, that the pedals were the ground-element of the development of his unfathomable intellect, and that without feet, he could never have attained his intellectual height."

Zelter was instrumental in building up the Sing-Akademie, broadening their repertoire to instrumental music and encouraging the growing library, another important repository for Bach manuscripts. Zelter had been responsible for Mendelssohn's father Abraham Mendelssohn becoming a member of the Sing-Akademie in 1796. As a consequence, one of the major new forces behind the library became Sara Levy, the great-aunt of Felix Mendelssohn, who had assembled one of the most-important private collections of 18th-century music in Europe. An accomplished harpsichordist, Sara Levy's teacher had been Wilhelm Friedemann Bach and she had been a patroness of C.P.E. Bach, circumstances which gave her family close contacts with Bach and resulted in his music enjoying a privileged status in the Mendelssohn household. Felix's mother Lea, who had studied under Kirnberger, gave him his first music lessons. In 1819, Zelter was appointed as the composition teacher of Felix and his sister Fanny; he taught counterpoint and music theory according to the methods of Kirnberger. Felix's piano teacher was Ludwig Berger, a pupil of Muzio Clementi, and his organ teacher was August Wilhelm Bach (unrelated to J.S. Bach), who had himself studied musical theory under Zelter. A.W. Bach was organist of the Marienkirche, Berlin, which had an organ built in 1723 by Joachim Wagner. Mendelssohn's organ lessons were conducted on the Wagner organ, with Fanny present; they commenced in 1820 and lasted for less than two years. It is probable that he learnt some of J. S. Bach's organ works, which had remained in the repertoire of many Berlin organists; his choice would have been limited, because at that stage his pedal technique was still rudimentary.

In autumn 1821 the twelve-year-old Mendelssohn accompanied Zelter on a trip to Weimar, stopping on the way in Leipzig where they were shown the cantor's room in the choir school of the Thomaskirche by Bach's successor Schicht. They stayed two weeks in Weimar with Goethe, to whom Mendelssohn played extensively on the piano each day. All Mendelssohn's music lessons stopped by summer 1822 when his family left for Switzerland. In the 1820s, Mendelssohn visited Goethe four more times in Weimar, the last time being in 1830, a year after his resounding success in reviving Bach's St Matthew Passion in Berlin, with the collaboration of Zelter and members of the Sing-Akademie. On this last trip, again by way of Leipzig, he stayed two weeks in Weimar and had daily meetings with Goethe, by then in his eighties. He later gave an account to Zelter of a visit to the church of St Peter and St Paul where Bach's cousin Johann Gottfried Walther had been organist and where his two eldest sons had been baptized:

One day Goethe asked me if I would not care to pay a compliment to craftsmanship and call on the organist, who might let me see and hear the organ in the town church. I did so, and the instrument gave me great pleasure ... The organist gave me the choice of hearing something learned or for the people ... so I asked for something learned. But it was not much to be proud of. He modulated around enough to make one giddy, but nothing unusual came of it; he made a number of entries, but no fugue was forthcoming. When my turn came, I let loose with the D minor toccata of Bach and remarked that this was at the same time something learned and for the people too, at least some of them. But see, I had hardly started to play when the superintendent dispatched his valet downstairs with the message that this playing had to be stopped right away because it was a weekday and he could not study with that much noise going on. Goethe was very much amused by this story.

In 1835, Mendelssohn was appointed director of the Gewandhaus Orchester in Leipzig, a post he held until his death in 1847 at the age of 38. He soon met other Bach enthusiasts including Robert Schumann, one year his junior, who had moved to Leipzig in 1830. Having been taught piano by J.G. Kuntsch, organist at the Marienkirche in Zwickau, Schumann seems to have started developing a deeper interest in Bach's organ music in 1832. In his diary he recorded sightreading the six organ fugues BWV 543–548 for four hands with Clara Wieck, the twelve-year-old daughter of his Leipzig piano teacher Friedrich Wieck and his future wife. Schumann later acknowledged Bach as the composer who had influenced him most. In addition to collecting his works, Schumann started with Friedrich Wieck a new fortnightly music magazine, the Neue Zeitschrift für Musik, in which he promoted the music of Bach as well as that of contemporary composers, such as Chopin and Liszt. One of the main contributors was his friend Carl Becker, organist at the Peterskirche and in 1837 the Nikolaikirche. Schumann remained as editor-in-chief until 1843, the year in which Mendelssohn became the founding director of the Leipzig Conservatory. Schumann was appointed professor for piano and composition at the conservatory; other appointments included Moritz Hauptmann (harmony and counterpoint), Ferdinand David (violin) and Becker (organ and music theory).

One of Mendelssohn's regrets since 1822 was that he had not had sufficient opportunity to develop his pedal technique to his satisfaction, despite having given public organ recitals. Mendelssohn explained later how difficult gaining access to organs had already been back in Berlin: "If only people knew how I had to plead and pay and cajole the organists in Berlin, just to be allowed to play the organ for one hour—and how ten times during such an hour I had to stop for this or that reason, then they would certainly speak differently." Elsewhere, on his travels, he had only sporadic opportunities to practice, but not often on pedalboards matching the standard of those in northern Germany, especially in England. The English organist Edward Holmes commented in 1835 that Mendelssohn's recitals in St Paul's Cathedral "gave a taste of his quality which in extemperaneous performance is certainly of the highest kind ... he has not we believe kept up that constant mechanical exercise of the instrument which is necessary to execute elaborate written works." In 1837, despite having performed the St Anne prelude and fugue in England to great acclaim, on his return to Germany Mendelssohn still felt dissatisfied, writing that, "This time I have resolved to practice the organ her in earnest; after all, if everyone takes me for an organist, I am determined, after the fact, to become one." It was only in the summer of 1839 that an opportunity arose when he spent six weeks on holiday in Frankfurt. There he had daily access to the pedal piano of his wife Cécile's cousin Friedrich Schlemmer and, probably through him, access to the organ in the Katharinenkirche built in 1779–1780 by Franz and Philipp Stumm.

August 1840 saw the fruits of Mendelssohn's labour: his first organ recital in the Thomaskirche. The proceeds from the concert were to go towards a statue of Bach in the vicinity of the Thomaskirche. Most of the repertoire in the concert had been played by Mendelssohn elsewhere, but nevertheless as he wrote to his mother, "I practised so much the previous eight days that I could barely stand on my own two feet and walked along the street in nothing but organ passages." The concert was wholly devoted to Bach's music, except for an improvised "free fantasy" at the end. In the audience was the elderly Friedrich Rochlitz, founding editor of the Allgemeine musikalische Zeitung, a journal that had promoted the music of Bach: Rochlitz is reported to have declared afterwards, "I shall depart now in peace, for never shall I hear anything finer or more sublime." The recital started with the St Anne prelude and fugue BWV 552. The only chorale prelude was Schmücke dich, o liebe Seele BWV 654 from the Great Eighteen Chorale Preludes, a favourite of both Mendelssohn and Schumann. Until that time very few of these or the shorter chorale preludes from the Orgelbüchlein had been published. Mendelssohn prepared an edition of both sets that was published in 1844 by Breitkopf and Härtel in Leipzig and by Coventry and Hollier in London. At about the same time the publishing house of Peters in Leipzig produced an edition of Bach's complete organ works in nine volumes edited by Friedrich Konrad Griepenkerl and Ferdinand Roitzsch. The E♭ prelude and fugue BWV 552 appears in Volume III (1845), the chorale preludes BWV 669–682, 684–689 in Volume VI and VII (1847) and BWV 683 in Volume V (1846) with chorale preludes from the Orgelbüchlein.

In 1845, while Robert was recovering from a nervous breakdown and a few months prior to the completion of his piano concerto, the Schumanns rented a pedalboard to place under their upright piano. As Clara recorded at the time, "On April 24th we got on hire a pedal-board to attach below the pianoforte, and we had great pleasure from it. Our chief object was to practice organ playing. But Robert soon found a higher interest in this instrument and composed some sketches and studies for it which are sure to find high favour as something quite new." The pedalflügel base on which the piano was placed had 29 keys connected to 29 separate hammers and strings encased at the rear of the piano. The pedal board was manufactured by the same Leipzig firm of Louis Schöne that had provided the grand pedal piano in 1843 for the use of students at the Leipzig Conservatory. Before composing any of his own fugues and canons for organ and pedal piano, Schumann had made a careful study of Bach's organ works, of which he had an extensive collection. Clara Schumann's Bach book, an anthology of organ works by Bach, now in the archives of the Riemenschneider Bach Institute, contains the whole of Clavier-Übung III, with detailed analytic markings by Robert Schumann. On the centenary of Bach's death in 1850, Schumann, Becker, Hauptmann and Otto Jahn founded the Bach Gesellschaft, an institution dedicated to publishing, without any editorial additions, the complete works of Bach through the publishers Breitkopf and Härtel. The project was completed in 1900. The third volume, devoted to keyboard works, contained the Inventions and Sinfonias and the four parts of the Clavier-Übung. It was published in 1853, with Becker as editor.

At the end of September 1853, having been recommended by the violinist and composer Joseph Joachim, the twenty-year-old Johannes Brahms appeared on the doorstep of the Schumann's home in Düsseldorf, staying with them until early November. Like Schumann, perhaps even more so, Brahms was deeply influenced by Bach's music. Shortly after his arrival he gave a performance on the piano of Bach's organ toccata in F BWV 540/1 in the house of Joseph Euler, a friend of Schumann. Three months after Brahms' visit, Schumann's mental state deteriorated: after a suicide attempt, Schumann committed himself to the sanitorium in Endenich near Bonn, where, after several visits from Brahms, he died in 1856. From its inception, Brahms subscribed to the Bach-Gesellschaft, of which he became an editor in 1881. An organist himself and a scholar of early and baroque music, he carefully annotated and analysed his copies of the organ works; he made a separate study of Bach's use of parallel fifths and octaves in his organ counterpoint. Brahms' Bach collection is now preserved in the Gesellschaft der Musikfreunde in Vienna, of which he became musical director and conductor in 1872. In 1875, he conducted a performance in the Musikverein of an orchestral arrangement by Bernhard Scholz of the prelude in E♭ BWV 552/1. In 1896, a year before he died, Brahms composed his own set of eleven chorale preludes for organ, Op.122. Like Schumann, who turned to Bach counterpoint as a form of therapy in 1845 during his recovery from mental illness, Brahms also viewed Bach's music as salutory during his final illness. As Brahms' friend and biographer Max Kalbeck reported:

He complained about his situation and said 'It's lasting so long.' He also told me that he was not able to listen to any music. The piano remained closed: he could only read Bach, that was all. He pointed to the piano, where on the music stand, which stood on top of the closed cover, lay a score of Bach.

Max Reger was a composer whose dedication to Bach has been described as a "monomaniacal identification" by the musicologist Johannes Lorenzen: in letters he frequently referred to "Allvater Bach". During his life, Reger arranged or edited 428 of Bach's compositions, including arrangements of 38 organ works for piano solo, piano duet or two pianos, starting in 1895. At the same time he produced a large number of his own organ works. Already in 1894, the organist and musicologist Heinrich Reimann, reacting to modernist trends in German music, had encouraged a return to the style of Bach, stating that, "Beyond this style there is no salvation ... Bach becomes for that reason the criterion of our art of writing for the organ." In 1894–1895 Reger composed his first suite for organ in E minor which was published in 1896 as his Op.16 with a dedication "To the Memory of Johann Sebastian Bach". The original intention was a sonata in three movements: an introduction and triple fugue; an adagio on the chorale Es ist das Heil uns kommen her; and a passacaglia. In the final version, Reger inserted an intermezzo (a scherzo and trio) as the third movement and expanded the adagio to contain a central section on the Lutheran hymns Aus tiefer Not and O Haupt voll Blut und Bunden. In 1896, Reger sent a copy of the suite to Brahms, his only contact. In the letter he asked permission to dedicate a future work to Brahms, to which he received the reply, "Permission for that is certainly not necessary, however! I had to smile, since you approach me about this matter and at the same time enclose a work whose all-too-bold dedication terrifies me!" The overall form of the suite follows the scheme of the eighth organ sonata Op.132 (1882) of Joseph Rheinberger and the symphonies of Brahms. The final passacaglia was a conscious reference to Bach's organ passacaglia in C minor BWV 582/1, but has clear affinities with the last movements of both Rheinberger's sonata and Brahms' fourth symphony. The second movement is an adagio in ternary form, with the beginning of the central section directly inspired by the setting of Aus tiefer Not in the pedaliter chorale prelude BWV 686 of Clavier-Übung III, paying homage to Bach as a composer of instrumental counterpoint. It has a similarly dense texture of six parts, two of them in the pedal. The outer sections are directly inspired by the musical form of the chorale prelude O Mensch, bewein dein Sünde groß BWV 622 from the Orgelbüchlein. (Note: In 1915 Reger composed two settings of BWV 622 for violin and organ and for string orchestra, which Christopher S. Anderson describes as "overwhelmingly beautiful.") The suite was first performed in the Holy Trinity Church, Berlin, in 1897 by the organist Karl Straube, a student of Reimann. According to a later account by one of Straube's students, Reimann had described the work as "so difficult as to be almost unplayable", which had "provoked Straube's virtuosic ambition, so that he set about mastering the work, which placed him before utterly new technical problems, with unflagging energy." Straube gave two further performances in 1898, in the cathedral at Wesel, where he had recently been appointed organist, and prior to that in Frankfurt, where he met Reger for the first time. In 1902, Straube was appointed organist at the Thomaskirche and in the following year cantor; he became the main proponent and performer of Reger's organ works.

=== England ===
The people who did attend appeared very much delighted, & some of them (especially the Visitors from Norwich) were good Judges, & of course tickled with such a Row as we gave them upon the most magnificent Organ I have yet heard, & I think in which you would agree with me. Your MS. Music Book has been of special Service to us: the triple fugue in E♭ was received with the same kind of Wonder that people express when they see an Air Balloon ascend for the first time: Smith I believe planted two or three Spies to watch the Effects of such Sound upon their Countenance, & consequently Mind.

— Samuel Wesley, 18 July 1815, letter to Vincent Novello reporting on a performance of BWV 552/2 at St Nicholas Church, Great Yarmouth

Apart from prevailing musical tastes and the difficulty in acquiring manuscript copies, a fundamental difference between the design of English and German organs made Bach's organ output less accessible to English organists, namely the absence of pedalboards. Handel's principal works for organ, his organ concertos Op. 4 and Op. 7, with the possible exception of op.7 No.1, all appear to have been written for a single manual chamber organ. Until the 1830s, most church organs in England did not have separate pedal pipes and before that the few organs that had pedalboards were all pull-downs, i.e. pedals that operated pipes connected to the manual stops. Pedalboards rarely contained more than 13 keys (an octave) or exceptionally 17 keys (an octave and a half). Pull-down pedalboards became more common from 1790 onwards. The pedaliter chorale preludes in Clavier-Übung III require a 30-key pedalboard, going from CC to f. It is for this reason that the Bach awakening in England started with clavier compositions being played on the organ or organ compositions being adapted either for piano duet or for two (or sometimes three) players at an organ. The newfound interest in Bach's organ music, as well as the desire to reproduce the grand and thunderous choral effects of the 1784 Handel Commemoration, eventually influenced organ builders in England. By the 1840s, after a series of experiments with pedals and pedal pipes starting around 1800 (in the spirit of the Industrial Revolution), newly constructed and existing organs started to be fitted with dedicated diapason pipes for the pedals, according to the well-established German model. The organ in St Paul's Cathedral commissioned in 1694 from Father Smith and completed in 1697, with a case by Christopher Wren, had exceptionally already been fitted with a 25-key pedalboard (two octaves C-c') of pull-down German pedals in the first half of the 18th century, probably as early as 1720, on the recommendation of Handel. By the 1790s, these had been linked to separate pedal pipes, described with detailed illustrations in Rees's Cyclopædia (1819). The four-manual "monster" organ in Birmingham Town Hall, constructed in 1834 by William Hill, had three sets of pedal pipes connected to the pedalboard, which could also be operated independently by a two-octave keyboard to the left of the manual keyboards. Hill's experiment of installing gigantic 32-foot pedal pipes, some currently still present, was only partially successful, as their scale did not permit them to sound properly.

The organist, composer and music teacher Samuel Wesley (1766–1837) played a significant role in awakening interest in Bach's music in England, mostly in the period 1808–1811. After a lull in his own career, in the first half of 1806 he made a hand copy of Nägeli's Zürich edition of The Well-Tempered Clavier. In early 1808 Wesley visited Charles Burney in his rooms in Chelsea where he played for him from the copy of Book I of the '48' that Burney had received from C.P.E. Bach in 1772. As Wesley later recorded, Burney "was very delighted ... and expressed his Wonder how much abstruse Harmony & such perfect & enchanting Melody could have been so marvelously united!" Wesley subsequently consulted Burney, now a convert to the music of Bach, on his project to publish his own corrected transcription, stating, "I believe I can fairly securely affirm that mine is now the most correct copy in England." This project was eventually undertaken in with Charles Frederick Horn, published in four installments between 1810 and 1813. In June 1808 after a concert the Hanover Square Rooms during which Weseley performed some excerpts from the '48', he commented that, "this admirable Musick might be played into Fashion; you see I have only risked one modest Experiment, & it has electrified the Town just in the way that we wanted." Further concerts took place there and in the Surrey Chapel with Benjamin Jacob, a fellow organist with whom Wesley corresponded copiously an effusively about Bach. The musicologist and organist William Crotch, another advocate of Bach, lectured on Bach in 1809 in the Hanover Square Rooms prior to publishing his edition of the E major fugue BWV 878/2 from The Well-Tempered Clavier II. In the introduction, after commenting that Bach fugues were "very difficult of execution, profoundly learned and highly ingenious", he described their "prevailing style" as "the sublime". By 1810, Wesley had stated his intention to perform the E♭ fugue BWV 552/2 from Clavier-Übung III in St. Paul's Cathedral. In 1812, in the Hanover Square Rooms he performed an arrangement of the E♭ prelude for organ duet and orchestra with the arranger Vincent Novello, founder of the music publishing firm Novello & Co, that would later bring out an English edition of Bach's complete organ works. In 1827, the E♭ fugue had been arranged for organ or piano duet by Jacob and was even performed by three players two years later on the organ in St. James, Bermondsey, where the pedal could be played on a supplementary keyboard. It had also been used for auditions for organists: Wesley's son Samuel Sebastian Wesley himself played it in 1827, when seeking employment (unsuccessfully). The chorale preludes from Clavier-Übung III were also performed during this period: in his letters to Benjamin, Wesley mentions in particular Wir glauben BWV 680, which had become known as the "giant fugue", because of the striding figure in the pedal part. By 1837, pedal technique on the organ had developed sufficiently in England that the composer and organist Elizabeth Stirling (1819–1895) could give concerts in St Katherine's, Regent's Park and St. Sepulchre's, Holborn containing several of the pedaliter chorale preludes (BWV 676, 678, 682, 684) as well as the St Anne Prelude BWV 552/1. (These were the first public recitals in England by a female organist; in 1838 she performed BWV 669–670 and the St Anne fugue BWV 552/2 at St Sepulchre's.) In the same year Wesley and his daughter were invited to the organ loft of Christ Church, Newgate for a Bach recital by Felix Mendelssohn. As Mendelssohn recorded in his diary,

Old Wesley, trembling and bent, shook hands with me and at my request sat down at the organ bench to play, a thing he had not done for many years. The frail old man improvised with great artistry and splendid facility, so that I could not but admire. His daughter was so moved by the sight of it all that she fainted and could not stop crying and sobbing.

A week later, Mendelssohn played the St Anne prelude and fugue BWV 552 on the organ in Birmingham Town Hall. Prior to the concert, he confided in a letter to his mother:

Ask Fanny, dear Mother, what she would say if I were to play in Birmingham the Bach organ prelude in E-flat major and the fugue that stands at the end of the same volume. I think she will grumble at me, but I think I would be right all the same. The prelude especially would be very acceptable to the English, I would think, and both in the prelude and in the fugue one can show off the piano, pianissimo, and the whole range of the organ—and it is not a dull piece either in my view!

Wesley died the following month. Mendelssohn made a total of 10 visits to Britain, the first in 1829, the last in 1847. His first visit, when he stayed with his friend the pianist and composer Ignaz Moscheles, had been a resounding success and Mendelssohn had been embraced by all strata of British musical society. On his fourth trip to Britain in 1833 he was accompanied by his father and heard the seventeen-year-old pianist-composer William Sterndale Bennett performing his first piano concerto. A musical prodigy like Mendelssohn, at the age of 10 Sterndale Bennett had entered the Royal Academy of Music, where he had been taught by Crotch. He was also an accomplished organist, familiar with the works of Bach. (After brief appointments as organist, he subsequently practised on the organ in Hanover Square Rooms, later surprising his son with his mastery of the harder pedal passages on a pedal-piano.) Mendelssohn immediately invited him to Germany. Reportedly when Sterndale Bennett asked to go as his student, Mendelssohn replied, "No, no, you must come to be my friend." Sterndale Bennett eventually visited Leipzig for 6 months from October 1836 to June 1837. There he made friends with Schumann, who became his soul mate and drinking partner. Sterndale Bennett made only two further trips to Germany during the lifetimes of Mendelssohn and Schumann, in 1838–1839 and 1842, although he retained their friendship and helped arrange Mendelssohn's visits to Britain. He became a firm proponent of Bach, organising concerts of his chamber music in London. He was one of the founders in 1849 of the original Bach Society in London, devoted to the performance and collection of Bach's works, principally choral. In 1854, he staged the first performance in England of the St. Matthew Passion in the Hanover Square Rooms.

Already in 1829, Mendelssohn had become friends with Thomas Attwood, who had studied with Mozart and since 1796 had been organist of St Paul's Cathedral. Through Attwood Mendelssohn gained access to the organ at St Paul's, which was suitable for Bach, despite the unusual alignment of the pedalboard. In 1837, however, during a recital at St Paul's, just before playing to Wesley, the air supply to the organ had suddenly been interrupted; in a later account, that he had to retell annoyingly often, Mendelssohn related that George Cooper, the sub-organist,

ran off like a madman, quite red with anger, was a way a little while, and finally returned with the news that during the performance the organ-blower—on the instructions from the beadle, who had not been able to get people to leave the church and was forced to stay on longer against his will—had left the bellows, locked the door to them and left ... Shame! Shame! was called out from all sides. Three or four clerics appeared and tore into the beadle furiously in front of all the people, threatening him with dismissal.

Cooper's son, also called George, became the next sub-organist at St Paul's. He promoted the organ music of Bach and in 1845 produced the first English edition of the chorale prelude Wir glauben BWV 680 from Clavier-Übung III, published by Hollier & Addison, which he dubbed the "Giant Fugue" because of its striding pedal part. In the second half of the 19th century, this became the best-known of all the pedaliter chorale preludes from Clavier-Übung III and was republished separately several times by Novello in organ anthologies at an intermediate level.

Mendelssohn's eighth visit occurred in 1842 after the accession of Queen Victoria to the throne. Her husband Prince Albert was a keen organist and, under his influence, the music of Bach started to be performed at royal concerts. On the second of his two invitations to Buckingham Palace, Mendelssohn improvised on Albert's organ and accompanied the queen in two songs by Fanny and himself. Between these two visits, he once more performed the St Anne prelude and fugue, this time before an audience of 3,000 in Exeter Hall in a concert organized by the Sacred Harmonic Society. In London there were few church organs with German pedal boards going down to CC: those which did included St. Paul's Cathedral, Christ Church, Newgate and St. Peter's, Cornhill, where Mendelssohn frequently performed solo recitals. During his last visit in 1847, he once more entertained Victoria and Albert in Buckingham Palace in May before playing a few days later the prelude and fugue on the name of "BACH" BWV 898 on the barely functional organ in Hanover Square Rooms during one of the Ancient Concerts organized by Prince Albert, with William Gladstone in the audience.

In the late 1840s and early 1850s, organ building in England became more stable and less experimental, taking stock of traditions in Germany and innovations in France, particularly from the new generation of organ builders such as Aristide Cavaillé-Coll. One of the main names in organ building in England in the second half of the 19th century was Henry Willis. The manner in which the organ for St. George's Hall, Liverpool was planned and constructed marks the transition from what Nicholas Thistlethwaite calls the "insular movement" of the 1840s to the adoption of the established German system. Planning formally started on the organ in 1845: the main advisor to Liverpool Corporation was Samuel Sebastian Wesley, son of Samuel Wesley and an accomplished organist, particularly of Bach. He worked in consultation with a panel of university professors of music, who often disagreed with his eccentric suggestions. When Wesley tried to argue about the range of manual keyboards, justifying himself by the possibility of playing octaves with the left hand, he was reminded by the professors that the use of octaves was more common among pianists than first-rate organists and moreover that when he had been organist at Leeds Parish Church, "the dust on the half-dozen lowest keys on the GG manuals remained undisturbed for months." Willis was commissioned to build the organ only in 1851, after he had impressed the committee with the organ for Winchester Cathedral he had on display at The Crystal Palace during the Great Exhibition. The completed organ had four manual keyboards and a thirty key pedalboard, with 17 sets of pedal pipes and a range from CC to f. The instrument had unequal temperament and, as Wesley had stipulated, the air supply came from two large underground bellows powered by an eight horse-power steam engine. Among the innovations introduced by Willis were the cylindrical pedal-valve, the pneumatic lever and the combination action, the latter two features being adopted widely by English organ builders in the second half of the 19th century. The organ was inaugurated in 1855 by William Thomas Best, who later that year was appointed resident organist, attracting crowds of thousands to here his playing. In 1867, he had the organ retuned to equal temperament. He remained in his post until 1894, giving performances elsewhere in England, including at the Crystal Palace, St James's Hall and the Royal Albert Hall. The St Anne prelude and fugue BWV 552 was used by Best to start off the series of Popular Monday Concerts at St James's Hall in 1859; and later in 1871 to inaugurate the newly built Willis organ in the Royal Albert Hall, in the presence of Queen Victoria.

=== France ===
One day I was passing by the small rooms on the first floor of the Maison Érard, reserved only for great pianists, for their practice and lessons. At the time the rooms were all empty, except one, from which could be heard the great Triple-Prelude in E-flat by Bach played remarkably well on a pedalier. I listened, riveted to the spot by the expressive, crystal-clear playing of a little old man, frail in appearance, who, without seeming to suspect my presence, continued the piece right to the end. Then, turning to me: 'Do you know this music?' he asked. I replied that, as an organ pupil in Franck's class at the Conservatoire, I could scarcely ignore such a fine work. 'Play me something' he added, giving up the piano stool for me. Although somewhat over-awed, I managed to play quite cleanly the C Major Fugue ... Without comment he returned to the piano saying 'I am Charles-Valentin Alkan and I'm just preparing for my annual series of six 'Petits Concerts' at which I play only the finest things'.

— Vincent d'Indy, 1872

In France, the Bach revival was slower to take root. Before the late 1840s, after the upheaval caused by the French Revolution, Bach was rarely performed in public concerts in France and it was preferred that church organists play operatic arias or popular airs instead of counterpoint. One exception was a public performance in the Paris Conservatoire in December 1833, repeated two years later in the Salons Pape, of the opening allegro of Bach's concerto for three harpsichords BWV 1063, played on pianos by Chopin, Liszt and Hiller. Berlioz later described their choice as "stupid and ridiculous", unworthy of their talents. Charles Gounod, having won the Prix de Rome in 1839, spent three years in the Villa Medici in Rome, where he developed a passionate interest in the polyphonic music of Palestrina. He also met Mendelssohn's sister Fanny, herself an accomplished concert pianist and by then married to the artist Wilhelm Hensel: Gounod described her as "an outstanding musician and a woman of superior intelligence, small, slender, but gifted with an energy which showed in her deep-set eyes and in her burning look." In response Fanny noted in her diary that Gounod was "passionately fond of music in a way I have rarely seen before." She introduced Gounod to the music of Bach, playing from memory fugues, concertos and sonatas for him on the piano. At the end of his stay in 1842, the twenty-five-year-old Gounod had become a confirmed Bach devotee. In 1843, after a seven-month stay in Vienna, with a letter of introduction from Fanny, Gounod spent 4 days with her brother in Leipzig. Mendelssohn played Bach for him on the organ of the Thomaskirche and conducted a performance of his Scottish Symphony by the Gewandhaus orchestra, specially convened in his honour. Back in Paris, Gounod took up an appointment as organist and music director in the Église des Missions Étrangères on the rue de Bac, on condition that he would be allowed to have autonomy over the music: Bach and Palestrina figured strongly in his repertoire. When churchgoers initially objected to this daily diet of counterpoint, Gounod was confronted by the Abbé, who eventually yielded to Gounod's conditions, although not without commenting "What a terrible man you are!"

In the late 1840s and 1850s a new school of organist-composers emerged in France, all trained in the organ works of Bach. These included Franck, Saint-Saëns, Fauré and Widor. In the aftermath of the French Revolution, there had already been a revival of interest in France in choral music of the baroque and earlier periods, particularly of Palestrina, Bach and Handel: Alexandre-Étienne Choron founded the Institution royale de musique classique et religieuse in 1817. After the July Revolution and Choron's death in 1834, direction of the institute, renamed the "Conservatoire royal de musique classique de France", was taken over by Louis Niedermeyer and took his name as the École Niedermeyer. Along with the Conservatoire de Paris, it became one of the main training grounds for French organists. The Belgian composer and musicologist François-Joseph Fétis, a contemporary and colleague of Choron in Paris, shared his interest in early and baroque music. Fétis exerted a similar influence in Brussels, where he was appointed director of the Royal Conservatory of Brussels in 1832, a position he held until his death in 1871.

At the same time, French organ builders most notably Aristide Cavaillé-Coll were starting to produce new series of organs, which with their pedalboards, were designed both for the music of Bach as well as modern symphonic compositions. The change in traditions can be traced back to the inauguration in 1844 of the organ for St Eustache, built by Doublaine and Callinet. The German organ virtuoso Adolf Friedrich Hesse was invited with five Parisians to demonstrate the new instrument. As part of his recital Hesse played Bach's Toccata in F major, BWV 540/1, allowing the Parisian audience to hear pedal technique far beyond what was known in France at that time. While impressed by his pedal playing, French commentators at the time gave Hesse mixed praise, one remarking that, while he might be the "king of the pedal ... he thinks of nothing but power and noise, his playing astonishes, but does not speak to the soul. He always seems to be the minister of an angry God who wants to punish." Another commentator, however, who had heard Hesse playing Bach on the organ at an industrial exhibition beforehand, noted that "if the organ of the Doublaine-Callinet firm is perfect from bottom to top, Monsieur Hesse is a complete organist from head to feet." The new organ had a short life: it was destroyed by fire from a falling candle in December 1844.

Two Belgian organist-composers, Franck and Jacques-Nicolas Lemmens, participated in the inauguration in 1854 of the new organ at St Eustache. Lemmens had studied with Hesse and Fétis; already in the early 1850s he had started giving public concerts in Paris, featuring Bach's organ music and using the brilliant foot technique he had learnt in Germany. At the same time Lemmens had published 18 installments of an organ manual for the use of "organistes du culte catholique", giving a complete introduction to the Bach tradition of organ playing, henceforth adopted in France.

In 1855, the piano firm Érard introduced a new instrument, the pedal piano (pédalier), a grand piano fitted with a full German-style pedalboard. The French composer, organist and virtuoso pianist Charles-Valentin Alkan and Lemmens gave concerts on it, including performances of Bach's toccatas, fugues and chorale preludes for organ. In 1858, Franck, a friend of Alkan, acquired a pédalier for his private use. Alkan, a devotee of Bach and one of the first subscribers to the Bach Gesellschaft, composed extensively for the pédalier, including in 1866 a set of twelve studies for pedalboard alone. In the 1870s, Alkan, by that time a recluse, returned to give a series of public Petits Concerts each year in the Salle Érard using their pédalier: Alkan's repertoire included the St Anne prelude as well as several chorale preludes.

There were further indications of changes in taste in France: Saint-Saëns, organist at the Madeleine from 1857 to 1877, refused to perform operatic arias as part of the liturgy, on one occasion replying to such a request, "Monsieur l'Abbé, when I hear from the pulpit the language of the Opéra Comique, I will play light music. Not before!" Saint-Saëns was nevertheless reluctant to use Bach's music in services. He regarded the preludes, fugues, toccatas and variations as virtuosic pieces for concert performance; and the chorale preludes as too Protestant in spirit for inclusion in a Catholic mass. The St Anne prelude and fugue was often used by Saint-Saëns for inaugurating Cavaillé-Coll organs; in Paris; he played for the inaugurations at St Sulpice (1862), Notre Dame (1868), Trinité (1869), the chapel in Versailles (1873) and the Trocadéro (1878).

The last two decades of the 19th century saw a revival of interest in Bach's organ music in France. There were public concerts on the new Cavaillé-Colle organ in the concert hall or Salle des Fêtes of the old Palais du Trocadéro, built for the third Paris exhibition in 1878. Organized by the organist Alexandre Guilmant, a pupil of Lemmens, in conjunction with Eugène Gigout, these started as six free concerts during the exhibition. Attracting huge crowds—the concert hall could seat 5,000 with sometimes an extra 2,000 standing—the concerts continued until the turn of the century. Guilmant programmed primarily the organ music of the two composers whom he referred to as "musical giants", Bach and Handel, still mostly unknown to these mass audiences, as well as the works of older masters such as Buxtehude and Frescobaldi. The St Anne prelude and fugue featured in the concerts, Saint-Saëns playing it in one of the first in 1879 and Guilmant again in 1899, in a special concert to mark the twentieth anniversary of the series. The concerts represented a new fin de siècle cult of Bach in France. It was not without its detractors: the music critic Camille Bellaigue (1858–1930) described Bach in 1888 as a "first-rate bore":

Of all the great musicians, the greatest, that is to say he without whom music itself would not exist, the founder, the patriarch, the Abraham, the Noah, the Adam of music, Johann Sebastian Bach, is the most tedious. ... How many times, crushed under these four-square merciless rhythms, lost amid this algebra of sound, this living geometry, smothered by the answers of these interminable fugues, one wants to close one's ears to this prodigious counterpoint ...

The chorale preludes of Bach were late to enter the French organ repertoire. César Franck, although only known to have performed one work by Bach in public, often set chorale preludes (BWV 622 and BWV 656) as examination pieces at the Conservatoire de Paris in the 1870s and 1880s. It was Charles-Marie Widor, Franck's successor on his death in 1890, who introduced the chorale preludes as a fundamental part of organ teaching there, where Bach's other organ works already provided the foundation stone. Widor believed that the music of Bach represented

the emotion of the infinite and exalted, for which words are an inadequate expression, and which can find proper utterence only in art ... it tunes the soul to a state in which we can grasp the truth and oneness of things, and rise above everything that is paltry, everything that divides us.

Unlike Saint-Saëns and his own teacher Lemmens, Widor had no objection to playing Bach organ music because of its Lutheran associations: "What speaks through his works is pure religious emotion; and this is one and the same in all men, in spite of the national and religious partitions in which we are born and bred." His student, the blind composer and organist, Louis Vierne later recalled:

At the reopening of the class at the beginning of 1892, there occurred an event of considerable importance to our artistic development. I mean the discovery of Bach's chorale preludes. I mean "discovery", and this is not an exaggeration, as you may judge for yourselves. At the first class in performance, Widor remarked with some surprise that since his arrival at the Conservatoire not one of us had brought in one of the celebrated chorales. For my part I was acquainted with three of them, published in Braille for the edition Franck had prepared for our school. They had seemed to me to have no technical difficulties and I had paid no further attention to them. My classmates did not even know that they existed. On looking through the music cabinet where there were several books in the Richault edition, we discovered three volumes, two of preludes and fugues and one of chorale preludes, the latter completely untouched, its leaves uncut. The Maître spent the entire class playing these pieces to us, and we were bowled over. The most overwhelming parts of the giant's organ works were suddenly revealed to us. We set to work on them at once, and for three months nothing else was heard in class. We all played chorale preludes at the examination in January, and the surprise of the jury was no less great than our own had been. Upon leaving the hall I heard Ambroise Thomas remark to Widor, "What music! Why didn't I know about that forty years ago? It ought to be the Bible of all musicians, and especially of organists.

On Widor's recommendation, Guilmant succeeded him as professor of organ in the conservatory in 1896. In 1899, he installed a three manual Cavaillé-Coll organ in his home in Meudon, where he gave lessons to a wide range of pupils, including a whole generation of organists from the United States. Among his French students were Nadia Boulanger, Marcel Dupré and Georges Jacob. Dupré started lessons with Guilmant at the age of eleven, later becoming his successor at the conservatoire. In two celebrated series of concerts at the conservatoire in 1920 and at the Palais du Trocadéro the following year, Dupré performed the complete organ works of Bach from memory in 10 concerts: the ninth concert was devoted entirely to the chorale preludes from Clavier-Übung III. Dupré also taught in Meudon, having acquired Guilmant's Cavaillé-Coll organ in 1926. The funeral service for Guilmant at his home in 1911, prior to his burial in Paris, included a performance by Jacob of Aus tiefer Noth BWV 686.

== 20th century ==
During the 20th century, the process of recognising the musical as well as the pedagogic value of some of the works continued, as in the promotion of the cello suites by Pablo Casals, the first major performer to record these suites. Leading performers of classical music such as Willem Mengelberg, Edwin Fischer, Georges Enescu, Leopold Stokowski, Herbert von Karajan, Arthur Grumiaux, Helmut Walcha, Wanda Landowska, Karl Richter, Michele Levin, I Musici, Dietrich Fischer-Dieskau, Glenn Gould recorded his music.

Glenn Gould's debut 1955 recording of the Goldberg Variations transformed the work from an obscure piece often considered "esoteric" to one that is now part of the standard piano repertoire. The album had "astonishing" sales for a classical work and is now one of the most well known piano recordings. Andres Segovia left behind a large body of edited works and transcriptions for classical guitar released in 1969 as his all Bach album recording for Saga Records, including several transcriptions of Bach, particularly an extraordinarily-demanding classical guitar transcription of the Chaconne from the 2nd Partita for Violin (BWV 1004).

A significant development in the later part of the 20th century was the momentum gained by the historically informed performance practice, with forerunners such as Nikolaus Harnoncourt acquiring prominence by their performances of Bach's music. His keyboard music was again performed more on the instruments Bach was familiar with, rather than on modern pianos and 19th-century romantic organs. Ensembles playing and singing Bach's music not only kept to the instruments and the performance style of his day but were also reduced to the size of the groups Bach used for his performances. But that was far from the only way Bach's music came to the forefront in the 20th century: his music was heard in versions ranging from Ferruccio Busoni's late romantic piano transcriptions to jazzy interpretations such as those by The Swingle Singers, orchestrations like the one opening Walt Disney's Fantasia movie, and synthesiser performances such as Wendy Carlos' Switched-On Bach recordings.

Bach's music has influenced other genres. For instance, jazz musicians have adopted Bach's music, with Jacques Loussier, Ian Anderson, Uri Caine, and the Modern Jazz Quartet among those creating jazz versions of his works. Several 20th-century composers referred to Bach or his music, for example Eugène Ysaÿe in Six Sonatas for solo violin, Dmitri Shostakovich in 24 Preludes and Fugues and Heitor Villa-Lobos in Bachianas Brasileiras. All kinds of publications involved Bach: not only were there the Bach Jahrbuch publications of the Neue Bachgesellschaft, various other biographies and studies by among others Albert Schweitzer, Charles Sanford Terry, Alfred Dürr, Christoph Wolff, Peter Williams, John Butt, and the 1950 first edition of the Bach-Werke-Verzeichnis; but also books such as Gödel, Escher, Bach put the composer's art in a wider perspective. Bach's music was extensively listened to, performed, broadcast, arranged, adapted, and commented upon in the 1990s.

== 21st century ==
In the 21st century, Bach's compositions have become available online, for instance at the International Music Score Library Project. High-resolution facsimiles of Bach's autographs became available at the Bach Digital website. 21st-century biographers include Christoph Wolff, Peter Williams, and John Eliot Gardiner. (Note: See Wolff 2001; Williams 2003; Williams 2007; Williams 2016; Gardiner 2013.)

In 2011, Anthony Tommasini, chief classical music critic of The New York Times, ranked Bach the greatest composer of all time.

for his matchless combination of masterly musical engineering (as one reader put it) and profound expressivity. Since writing about Bach in the first article of this series I have been thinking more about the perception that he was considered old-fashioned in his day. Haydn was 18 when Bach died, in 1750, and Classicism was stirring. Bach was surely aware of the new trends. Yet he reacted by digging deeper into his way of doing things. In his austerely beautiful Art of Fugue, left incomplete at his death, Bach reduced complex counterpoint to its bare essentials, not even indicating the instrument (or instruments) for which these works were composed. On his own terms he could be plenty modern. ...he demonstrated visceral flair for drama in his sacred choral works, as in the crowd scenes in the Passions where people cry out with chilling vehemence for Jesus to be crucified. In keyboard works like the Chromatic Fantasy and Fugue, Bach anticipated the rhapsodic Romantic fervor of Liszt, even Rachmaninoff. And as I tried to show in the first video for this project, through his chorales alone Bach explored the far reaches of tonal harmony.

Alex Ross writes, "Bach became an absolute master of his art by never ceasing to be a student of it. His most exalted sacred works—the two extant Passions, from the seventeen-twenties, and the Mass in B Minor, completed not long before his death in 1750—are feats of synthesis, mobilizing secular devices to spiritual ends. They are rooted in archaic chants, hymns, and chorales. They honor, with consummate skill, the scholastic discipline of canon and fugue. They make expert use of the word-painting techniques of the Renaissance madrigal and Baroque opera. They absorb such stock scenes as the lament, the pastoral, the lullaby, the rage aria, the tempest. They allude to courtly French dances, Italian love songs, [and] the polonaise. Their furious development of brief motifs anticipates Beethoven, who worshipped Bach when he was young. And their most daring harmonic adventures—for example, the otherworldly modulations in the 'Confiteor' of the B-Minor Mass—look ahead to Wagner, even to Schoenberg."

The liturgical calendar of the Episcopal Church has a feast day for Bach on 28 July; on the same day, the Calendar of Saints of some Lutheran churches, such as the ELCA, remembers Bach, Handel, and Heinrich Schütz. In 2015, Bach's handwritten personal copy of the Mass in B minor, held by the Berlin State Library, was added to UNESCO's Memory of the World Register, a program intended to protect culturally significant manuscripts. In 2019, Bach was named the greatest composer of all time in a poll conducted among 174 living composers. A study conducted by the Riemenschneider Bach Institute notes that advertisers prefer to use Bach's music in television commercials in order to convey reassurance.

== Memorials and commemorations ==
The Bach memorial was erected by Felix Mendelssohn in Leipzig in honor of Bach in 1843 in front of the Thomaskirche. In 1908, a Statue of Bach was placed in commemoration of Bach in front of the Thomaskirche in Leipzig. Since 1985, Bosehaus in Leipzig is where the Bach Archive has been housed. Around 2000, the 250th anniversary of Bach's death, three record companies issued box sets with complete recordings of Bach's music.

Bach's music features three times—more than that of any other composer—on the Voyager Golden Record, a gramophone record containing a broad sample of the images, common sounds, languages, and music of Earth, sent into outer space with the two Voyager probes. Tributes to Bach in the 20th century include statues erected in his honour and a variety of things such as streets and space objects being named after him. Also, a multitude of musical ensembles such as the Bach Aria Group, Deutsche Bachsolisten, Bachchor Stuttgart, and Bach Collegium Japan adopted the composer's name. Bach festivals were held on several continents, and competitions and prizes such as the International Johann Sebastian Bach Competition, Johann Sebastian Bach International Piano Competition (Washington D.C.), and the Royal Academy of Music Bach Prize were named after the composer.

== Sources ==
- "A-Wgm A 169b". Bach Digital. Leipzig: Bach Archive; et al. 25 September 2018.
- "Bach, Carl Philipp Emanuel". Bach Digital. Leipzig: Bach Archive; et al. 6 April 2020.
- Anderson, Christopher S. (2003). Max Reger and Karl Straube: Perspectives on an Organ Performing Tradition. Ashgate. ISBN 0-7546-3075-7.
- Anderson, Christopher S. (2013). "3. Max Reger (1873-1916)". Twentieth-Century Organ Music. Routledge. pp. 76–115. ISBN 9781136497896.
- Applegate, Celia (2005). Bach in Berlin: Nation and Culture in Mendelssohn's Revival of the St. Matthew Passion. Ithaca, New York: Cornell University Press. ISBN 0-8014-4389-X.
- August, Robert (September 2010). "An Old Look at Schumann's Organ Works" (PDF). Diapason: 24–29. Archived from the original (PDF) on 10 July 2021.
- Barger, Judith (2007). Elizabeth Stirling and the Musical Life of Female Organists in Nineteenth-Century England. Ashgate. doi:10.4324/9781351159081. ISBN 978-0-7546-5129-1. OCLC 681216638.
- Bicknell, Stephen (2001) [1996]. The History of the English Organ. Cambridge University Press. ISBN 0-521-65409-2.
- Brown, A. Peter (2002). The First Golden Age of the Viennese Symphony: Haydn, Mozart, Beethoven, and Schubert. The Symphonic Repertoire. Vol. II. Indiana University Press. ISBN 978-0-253-33487-9.
- Butler, Gregory (1990). Bach's Clavier-Übung III: the making of a print. Duke University Press. ISBN 0822310090.
- Butler, Gregory (2008). "Scribes, Engravers, and Notational Styles: The Final Disposition of Bach's Art of Fugue". In Gregory, Butler; Stauffer, George B.; Greer, Mary Dalton (eds.). About Bach. University of Illinois Press. pp. 111–123. ISBN 978-0-252-03344-5 – via Project MUSE.
- Byrne Bodley, Lorraine (2004). "Goethe and Zetler: An Exchange of Musical Letters". Goethe: Musical Poet, Musical Catalyst. Peter Lang. pp. 41–65. ISBN 1-904505-10-4.
- Byrne Bodley, Lorraine (2009). Goethe and Zelter: Musical Dialogues. Ashgate. ISBN 978-0-7546-5520-6.
- Butt, John, ed. (1997). The Cambridge Companion to Bach. Cambridge Companions to Music. Cambridge University Press. ISBN 0-521-58780-8.
- Christensen, Thomas (1998). "Bach among the Theorists". In Marissen, Michael (ed.). Creative Responses to Bach from Mozart to Hindemith. Bach Perspectives. Vol. 2. University of Nebraska Press. pp. 23–46. ISBN 0-8032-1048-5.
- Dahlhaus, Carl (1991). The Idea of Absolute Music. Translated by Lustig, Roger. University of Chicago Press. ISBN 0-226-13487-3.
- David, Hans Theodor [in German]; Mendel, Arthur, eds. (1945). The Bach Reader: A Life of Johann Sebastian Bach in Letters and Documents. W. W. Norton & Company.
- David, Hans Theodor; Mendel, Arthur; Wolff, Christoph, eds. (1998). The New Bach Reader: A Life of Johann Sebastian Bach in Letters and Documents. W. W. Norton & Company. ISBN 978-0-393-04558-1.
- Dolge, Alfred (1911). Pianos and Their Makers. Vol. I. Covina publishing company.
- Dürr, Alfred (1971). Die Kantaten von Johann Sebastian Bach (in German). DTV.
- Dürr, Alfred; Jones, Richard D. P. (2006). The Cantatas of J. S. Bach and Their Librettos in German–English Parallel Text. Oxford University Press. ISBN 978-0-19-929776-4. Updated translation of Dürr's Die Kantaten von Johann Sebastian Bach
- Eatock, Colin (2009). Mendelssohn and Victorian England. Ashgate. ISBN 978-0-7546-6652-3.
- Eddie, William Alexander (2007). Charles-Valentin Alkan: His Life and His Music. Ashgate. ISBN 978-1-84014-260-0.
- Eidam, Klaus (2001). The True Life of Johann Sebastian Bach. New York: Basic Books. ISBN 978-0-465-01861-1.
- Ellis, Katharine (2005). Interpreting the Musical Past: Early Music in Nineteenth-Century France. Oxford University Press. ISBN 0195176820.
- Forkel, Johann Nikolaus; Terry, Charles Sanford (1920). Johann Sebastian Bach: His Life, Art and Work – translated from the German, with notes and appendices. New York: Harcourt, Brace and Howe.
- Franck, Wolf (1949). "Musicology and Its Founder, Johann Nicolaus Forkel (1749–1818)". The Musical Quarterly. 35 (4): 588–601. doi:10.1093/mq/xxxv.4.588. JSTOR 739879.
- Frisch, Walter (2005). "Four: Bach, Regeneration, and Historicist Modernism". German Modernism: Music and the Arts. University of California Press. pp. 138–185. doi:10.1525/9780520940802-006. ISBN 0-520-24301-3. JSTOR 10.1525/j.ctt1ppg7s. S2CID 226781390.
- Gardiner, John Eliot (2013). Music in the Castle of Heaven: A Portrait of Johann Sebastian Bach. Penguin. ISBN 9781846147210.
- Geck, Martin (2003). Bach. Translated by Bell, Anthea. Haus Publishing. ISBN 978-1-904341-16-1.
- Geck, Martin (2006). Johann Sebastian Bach: Life and Work. Harcourt. ISBN 978-0-15-100648-9.
- Green, Edward Noel (2008). Chromatic Completion in the Late Vocal Music of Haydn and Mozart: A Technical, Philosophic, and Historical Study (PhD). New York University. ISBN 978-0-549-79451-6. OCLC 670307034.
- Harding, James (1973). Gounod. Stein and Day. ISBN 0-8128-1541-6.
- Harrison, Charles; Wood, Paul; Gaiger, Jason (2001). Art in Theory 1648-1815: An Anthology of Changing Ideas. Wiley-Blackwell. ISBN 0-631-20064-9.
- Heartz, Daniel (2008). Mozart, Haydn and Early Beethoven: 1781-1802. W. W. Norton & Company. ISBN 978-0-393-28578-9.
- Kassler, Michael, ed. (2004). The English Bach Awakening: Knowledge of J. S. Bach and his Music in England 1750–1830. Essays by Kassler, Michael; Tomita, Yo; Olleson, Philip. Ashgate. doi:10.4324/9781315086699. ISBN 1-84014-666-4.
- Kassler, Michael (2008). A.F.C. Kollmann's Quarterly musical register (1812): an annotated edition with an introduction to his life and works. Ashgate. ISBN 978-0-7546-6064-4.
- Kerst, Friedrich [in German], ed. (1904). Beethoven im eigenen Wort [Beethoven in his own words]. Brevier-Bibliothek (in German). Schuster & Loeffler.
- Köchel, Ludwig Ritter von (1862). Chronologisch-thematisches Verzeichniss sämmtlicher Tonwerke W. A. Mozart's (in German). Breitkopf & Härtel. OCLC 3309798.
- Kupferberg, Herbert (1985). Basically Bach: A 300th Birthday Celebration. McGraw-Hill. ISBN 978-0-07-035646-7.
- Lempfrid, Wolfgang (2019). "[J.S. Bach]: Kontroverse Scheibe vs. Birnbaum". KölnKlavier (in German).
- Lester, Joel (1994). "Chapter Nine: The Marpurg-Kirnberger Disputes". Compositional Theory in the Eighteenth Century. Harvard University Press. pp. 231–257. ISBN 0-674-15523-8.
- Little, William A. (2009). "Mendelssohn's Dilemma: 'The collection of chorale preludes or the passacaille?'". The American Organist. 43: 65–71.
- Little, William A. (2010). Mendelssohn and the Organ. Oxford University Press. ISBN 978-0-19-539438-2.
- Lonsdale, Roger H. (1965). Dr. Charles Burney: A Literary Biography. Clarendon Press.
- Mattheson, Johann (1717). Das Beschützte Orchestre, oder desselben Zweyte Eröffnung (in German). Hamburg: Schiller.
- Marx, Adolph Bernhard, ed. (1833). Johann Sebastian Bach's noch wenig bekannte Orgelcompositionen: auch am Pianoforte von einem oder zwei Spielern ausführbar. Breitkopf & Härtel.
- May, Ernest (1996). "Connections between Breitkopf and J. S. Bach". In Stauffer, George B. (ed.). J. S. Bach, the Breitkopfs, and Eighteenth-Century Music Trade. Bach Perspectives. Vol. 2. University of Nebraska Press. pp. 11–26. ISBN 0-8032-1044-2.
- McKay, Cory (1999). "The Bach Reception in the 18th and 19th Centuries" (PDF). Schulich School of Music. McGill University. Archived from the original (PDF) on 2 February 2010.
- Mendel, Arthur (1950). "More for 'The Bach Reader'". The Musical Quarterly. 36 (4): 485–510. doi:10.1093/mq/xxxvi.4.485. JSTOR 739638.
- Mizler, Lorenz Christoph (April 1738). "V – Der Critische Musicus, herausgegeben von Johann Adolph Scheibe. Erster Theil. Hamburg, bey seel. Thomas von Wierings Erben im güldenen A. B. C. 1738.". Vierter Theil. Musikalische Bibliothek (in German). Vol. IV. Leipzig. pp. 54–62.
- Morris, Edmund (2007). Beethoven: the Universal Composer. New York: HarperCollins. ISBN 9780007213702.
- Murray, Michael (11 August 1998). French Masters of the Organ: Saint-Saëns, Franck, Widor, Vierne, Dupré, Langlais, Messiaen. Yale University Press. ISBN 0-300-07291-0.
- Niecks, Frederick (1925). Niecks, Christina (ed.). Robert Schumann. Dent.
- Ochse, Orpha (2000) [1994]. Organists and Organ Playing in Nineteenth-Century France and Belgium. Indiana University Press. ISBN 0-253-21423-8.
- Parrott, Isabel (2006). "William Sterndale Bennett and the Bach Revival in Nineteenth-Century England". In Cowgill, Rachel; Rushton, Julian (eds.). Europe, Empire, and Spectacle in Nineteenth-Century British Music. Ashgate. pp. 29–44. ISBN 0-7546-5208-4.
- Picken, Laurence (1944). "Bach quotations from the eighteenth century". Music Review. 5: 83–95.
- Plumley, Nicholas M.; Niland, Austin (2001). A history of the organs in St Paul's cathedral. Positif Press. ISBN 0-906894-28-X.
- Rasmussen, Michelle (6 August 2001). "Bach, Mozart, and the 'Musical Midwife'". The New Federalist. Schiller Instituttet.
- Scheibe, Johann Adolf (14 May 1737). "Sechstes Stück" [Sixth Piece]. Der Critische Musicus [The Critical Musician] (in German). Vol. I. Hamburg: Thomas von Wierings Erben. pp. 41–48.
- Schenk, Erich (1959). Mozart and His Times. Translated by Winston, Richard and Clara. Alfred A. Knopf. OCLC 602180.
- Schneider, Max (1906). "Verzeichnis der bis zum Jahre 1851 gedruckten (und der geschrieben im Handel gewesenen) Werke von Johann Sebastian Bach". Bach-Jahrbuch 1906. Bach-Jahrbuch (in German). Vol. 3. Neue Bachgesellschaft. Breitkopf & Härtel. pp. 84–113. doi:10.13141/bjb.v19061047. hdl:2027/nyp.33433056670312.
- Scholes, Percy A. (1940). "A New Enquiry Into the Life and Work of Dr. Burney". Journal of the Royal Musical Association. 67: 1–30. doi:10.1093/jrma/67.1.1. JSTOR 765818.
- Schweitzer, Albert (1905). J. S. Bach le musicien-poète (in French). Preface by Widor, Charles-Marie. Breitkopf & Härtel.
- Schweitzer, Albert (1935) [1911]. J. S. Bach (based on the enlarged German edition (1908)). Vol. I, II. Translated by Newman, Ernest. Preface by Widor, Charles-Marie (reprint ed.). A. & C. Black. (Vol. I, Vol. II – via Internet Archive
- Smith, Rollin [in French] (1992). Saint-Saëns and the Organ. Pendragon Press. ISBN 0-945193-14-9.
- Smith, Rollin [in French] (2002). Toward an Authentic Interpretation of the Organ Works of César Franck. Pendragon Press. ISBN 1-57647-076-8.
- Smith, Ronald (1976). Alkan: The Enigma. Crescendo. ISBN 0-87597-105-9.
- Smither, Howard E. (1977). The Oratorio in the Baroque Era: Protestant Germany and England. A History of the Oratorio. Vol. 2. University of North Carolina Press. ISBN 0-8078-1294-3.
- Spitta, Philipp (1899) [1884–1885]. Johann Sebastian Bach: His Work and Influence on the Music of Germany, 1685–1750. Vol. I, II, III. Translated by Bell, Clara; Fuller Maitland, John Alexander. Novello & Co. Vol. I, Vol. II, Vol. III – via Internet Archive
- Spitta, Philipp (1921) [1873–1880]. Johann Sebastian Bach (in German). Vol. I, II. Breitkopf & Härtel. Vol. I, Vol. II
- Sponheuer, Bernd (2002). "Reconstructing Ideal Types of the 'German' in Music". In Applegate, Celia; Potter, Pamela (eds.). Music and German National Identity. University of Chicago Press. pp. 36–58. ISBN 0-226-02130-0.
- Stauffer, George B. (1990). The Forkel–Hoffmeister & Kühnel Correspondence: A Document of the Early 19th-century Bach Revival. C. F. Peters. ISBN 0-938856-04-9. OCLC 21600476. Appendix A contains a detailed list of works of Bach published by Hoffmeister & Kühnel.
- Sterndale Bennett, James Robert (1907). The life of William Sterndale Bennett. Cambridge University Press.
- Stinson, Russell (2006). The Reception of Bach's Organ Works from Mendelssohn to Brahms. Oxford University Press. ISBN 0-19-517109-8.
- Stinson, Russell (2008). "Clara Schumann's Bach Book: A Neglected Document of the Bach Revival". Bach. 39 (1). Riemenschneider Bach Institute: 1–66. JSTOR 41640571.
- Temperley, Nicholas (1989). "Schumann and Sterndale Bennett". 19th-Century Music. 12 (3): 207–220. doi:10.2307/746502. JSTOR 746502.
- Terry, Charles Sanford (1928). Bach: A Biography. Oxford University Press. OCLC 904224603.
- Thistlethwaite, Nicholas (1999) [1990]. "Bach, Mendelsohn and the English organ, 1810–45". 6. The Making of the Victorian Organ. Cambridge University Press. pp. 163–180. ISBN 0521663644.
- Todd, R. Larry (1983). Mendelssohn's Musical Education: A Study and Edition of His Exercises in Composition. Cambridge Studies in Music. Cambridge University Press. ISBN 0-521-24655-5.
- Tomita, Yo [in French] (2000). "Bach Reception in Pre-Classical Vienna: Baron van Swieten's circle edits the Well-Tempered Clavier II". Music & Letters. 81 (3): 364–391. doi:10.1093/ml/81.3.364.
- Tomita, Yo (25 November 2017). "The Simrock Edition of the Well-Tempered Clavier II". Queen's University Belfast. Archived from the original on 1 July 2017.
- Walther, Johann Gottfried (1732). "Bach (Joh. Sebastian)". Musicalisches Lexicon oder Musicalische Bibliothec (in German). Leipzig: W. Deer. p. 64.
- Williams, Peter (2003) [1980]. The Organ Music of J. S. Bach. Cambridge University Press. ISBN 0-521-89115-9.
- Williams, Peter (2004). The Life of Bach. Cambridge University Press. ISBN 978-0-521-53374-4.
- Williams, Peter (2007). Bach: A Life in Music. Cambridge University Press. ISBN 978-0-521-87074-0.
- Williams, Peter (2016). Bach: A Musical Biography. Cambridge University Press. ISBN 978-1-107-13925-1.
- Wolff, Christoph, ed. (1983). The New Grove Bach Family. Macmillan. ISBN 978-0-333-34350-0.
- Wolff, Christoph (1991). Bach: essays on his life and music. Harvard University Press. ISBN 0-674-05926-3.
- Wolff, Christoph (2001) [2000]. Johann Sebastian Bach: The Learned Musician. W. W. Norton. ISBN 9780393075953. 2002 edition, Oxford University Press.
- Wolff, Christoph (Spring 2005). "A Bach Cult in Late-Eighteenth-Century Berlin: Sara Levy's Musical Salon" (PDF). Bulletin of the American Academy: 26–31. Archived from the original (PDF) on 4 March 2016.
- Wollny, Peter (2006). "Chapter twelve: Wilhelm Friedemann Bach's Halle performances of cantatas by his father". In Melamed, Daniel R. (ed.). Bach Studies 2. Cambridge University Press. pp. 202–228. ISBN 978-0-521-02891-2.
- Zappalà, Pietro, ed. (1996). "Foreword (abridged)". Felix Mendelssohn Bartholdy: Magnificat MWV A2 (PDF). Stuttgarter Mendelssohn-Ausgaben. Translated by Schwartz, Laurie (Urtext, full score, 1st ed.). Carus. pp. VI–VII. 40.484.
