= BACH motif =

Musical motif spelling BACH

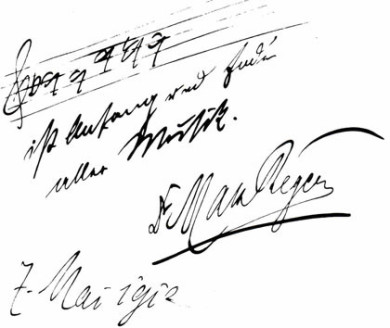
"b–a–c–h is beginning and end of all music" (Max Reger 1912)

In music, the BACH motif is a succession of notes important or characteristic to a piece, which consists of the notes B♭, A, C, B♮, forming a cruciform melody:

In German musical nomenclature, in which the note B natural is named H and the B-flat named B, it forms Johann Sebastian Bach's family name. One of the most frequently occurring examples of a musical cryptogram, the motif has been used by countless composers, especially after the Bach Revival in the first half of the 19th century.

== Origin ==
Johann Gottfried Walther's Musicalisches Lexikon (1732) contains the only biographical sketch of Johann Sebastian Bach published during the composer's lifetime. There the motif is mentioned thus:

...all those who carried the name [Bach] were as far as known committed to music, which may be explained by the fact that even the letters b a c h in this order form a melody. (This peculiarity was discovered by Mr. Bach of Leipzig.)

This reference work thus indicates Bach as the inventor of the motif.

== Usage in compositions ==
In a comprehensive study published in the catalogue for the 1985 exhibition "300 Jahre Johann Sebastian Bach" ("300 years of Johann Sebastian Bach") in Stuttgart, Germany, Ulrich Prinz lists 409 works by 330 composers from the 17th to the 20th century using the BACH motif. A similar list is available in Malcolm Boyd's volume on Bach: it also contains some 400 works.

=== Johann Sebastian Bach ===
A single note in a cross, a common motif in J. S. Bach's music, formed by four staves, using three clefs and two keys, that, when read clockwise, result in B–A–C–H; treble clef in F major: B, tenor clef=A, alto clef=C, treble in C major: H. This rebus is of early 20th-century origin. Composer Matthew King appears in his YouTube lectures on Bach in a T-shirt featuring this design.

Johann Sebastian Bach used the motif in a number of works, most famously as a fugue subject in the last Contrapunctus of The Art of Fugue. The motif also appears in other pieces. Later commentators wrote: "The figure occurs so often in Bach's bass lines that it cannot have been accidental."

Instances of B–A–C–H appearing in Johann Sebastian Bach's compositions and arrangements:

- Sarabande from his Cello Suite in C major, BWV 1009 (Beat 1 & 2 of bars 21 & 22)
- Fugue from his BWV 898
- Brandenburg Concerto No. 2, BWV 1047 (the continuo part at bar 109)
- Gigue from his English Suite No. 6 for keyboard
- The subject of the Sinfonia in F minor BWV 795 "incorporates" a version of the motif. This five-note version appears transposed: a♭'–g' (rest) g'–b♭'–a'. Eventually, in measure 17, the piece makes its way to a passage in which the five-note version of the motif starts on B♭: as B–A–(rest)–A–C–H.
- His arrangement of a motet for SSATB singers

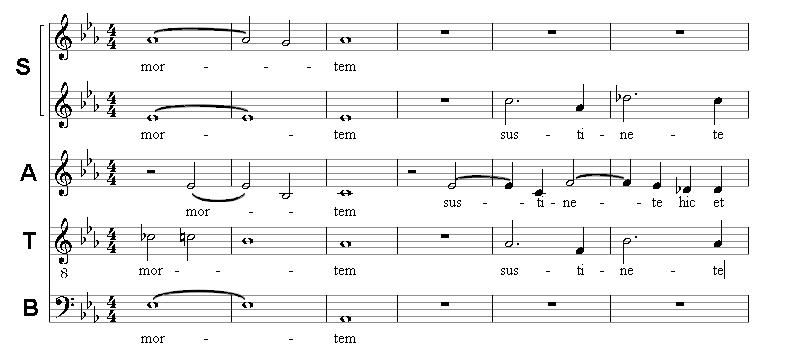
Excerpt of the Tristis est anima mea motet attributed to Kuhnau (F minor)

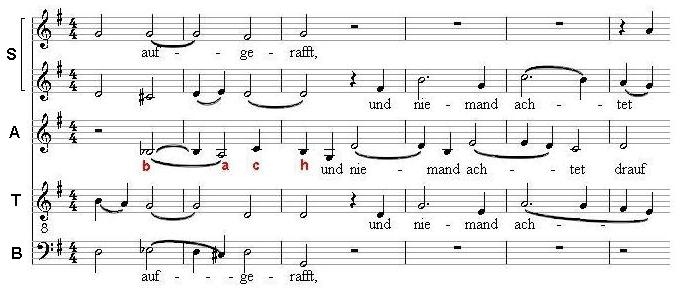
Bach's E minor arrangement of the same passage: B–A–C–H appears in the alto voice

- Near the end of the Augmentation Canon of Bach's Canonic Variations on "Vom Himmel hoch da komm' ich her", BWV 769:

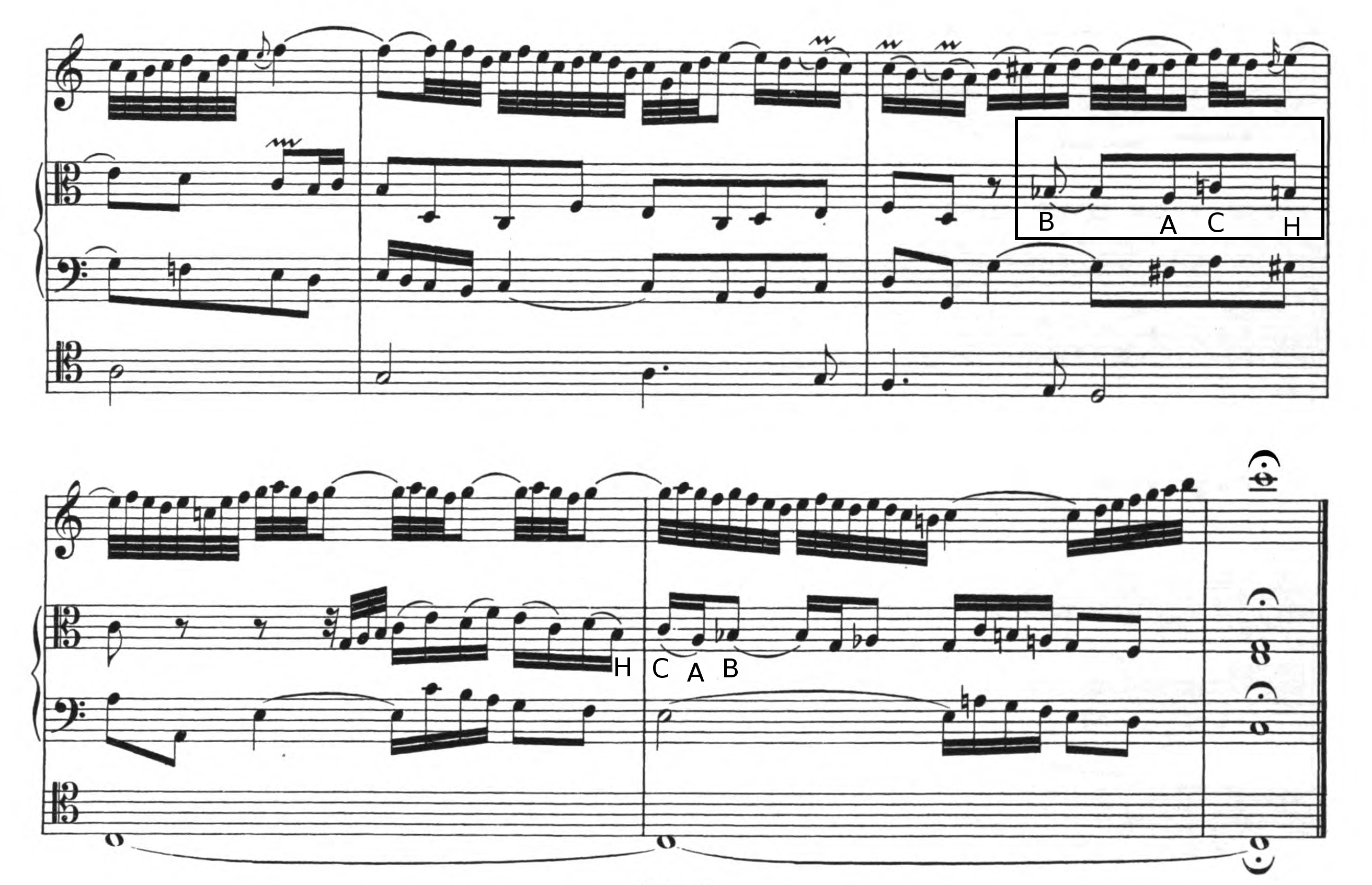
B–A–C–H (and its inversion) in the last bars of the Augmentation Canon of BWV 769

- Near the end of Contrapunctus IV of The Art of Fugue:

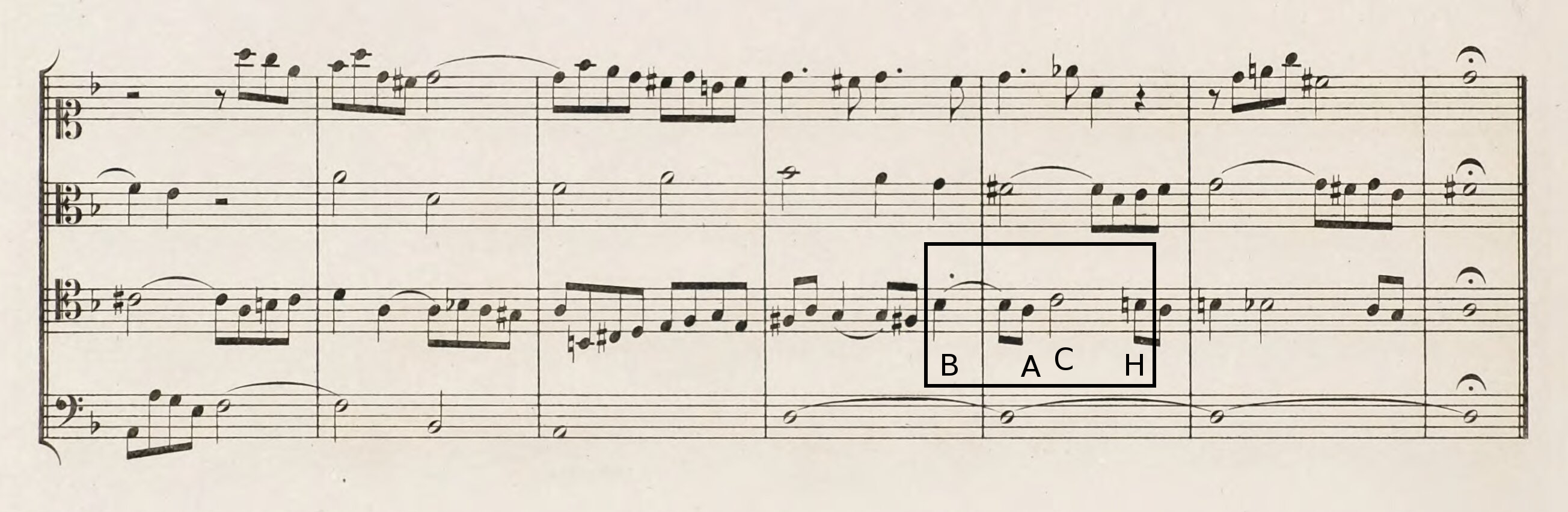
B–A–C–H in the tenor part of the last bars of Contrapunctus IV of The Art of Fugue

- As first four notes of the third and last subject of the final unfinished fugue of The Art of Fugue:

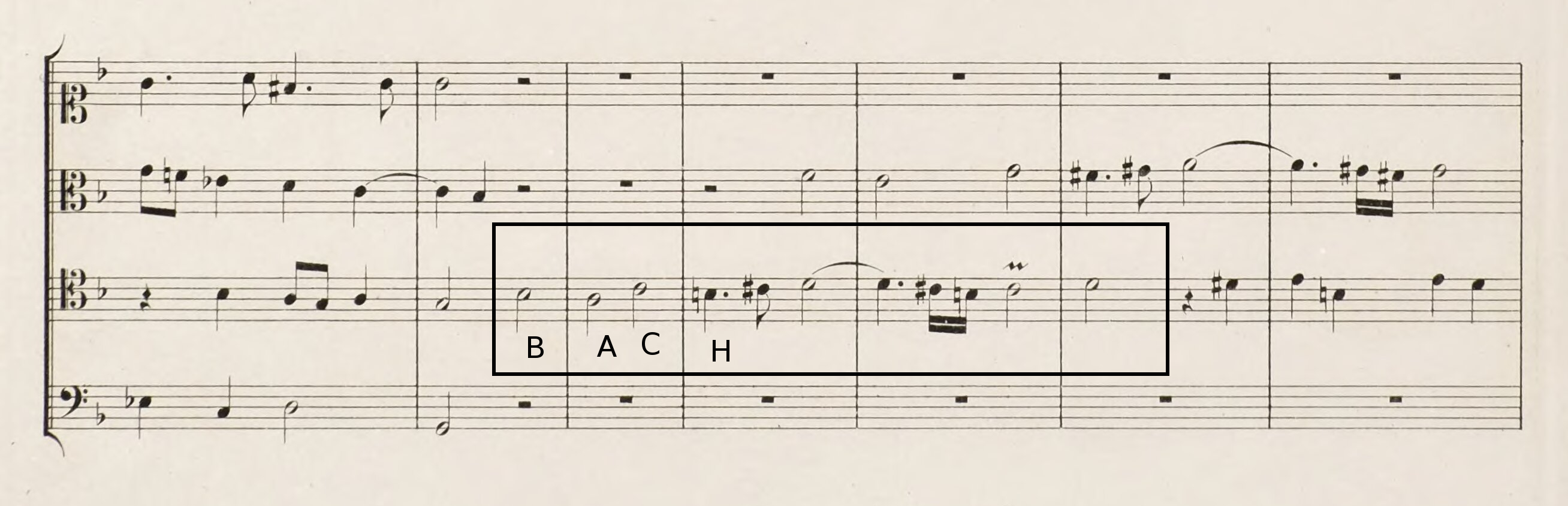
B–A–C–H opening the third and last subject of the unfinished fugue of The Art of Fugue

- In the Fugue in C♯ minor (BWV 849) from the first book of the Well-Tempered Clavier, the main subject begins with C♯-B♯-E-D♯, a transposed and altered version of the B-A-C-H motif.
- In the last bar of Komm, Gott, Schöpfer, heiliger Geist, BWV 667
- In the Dorian Toccata (at the exact midpoint in bars 49 and 50) and Fugue (many references, but the most obvious is probably in the pedal in bars 175 and 176)

Hans Heinrich Eggebrecht goes as far as to reconstruct Bach's putative intentions as an expression of Lutheran thought, imagining Bach to be saying, "I am identified with the tonic and it is my desire to reach it ... Like you I am human. I am in need of salvation; I am certain in the hope of salvation, and have been saved by grace," through his use of the motif rather than a standard changing tone figure (B♭–A–C–B♭) in the final measures of the fourth fugue of The Art of Fugue.

=== Other composers ===
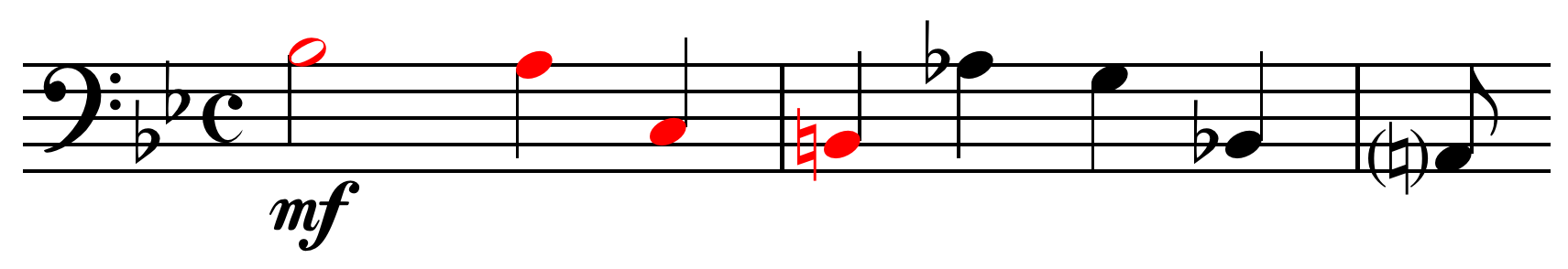
BACH motif followed by transposed version from Schumann's Sechs Fugen über den Namen B–A–C–H, Op. 60, No. 4, mm. 1–3 Note that C and H are transposed down, leaving the spelling unaffected but changing the melodic contour.

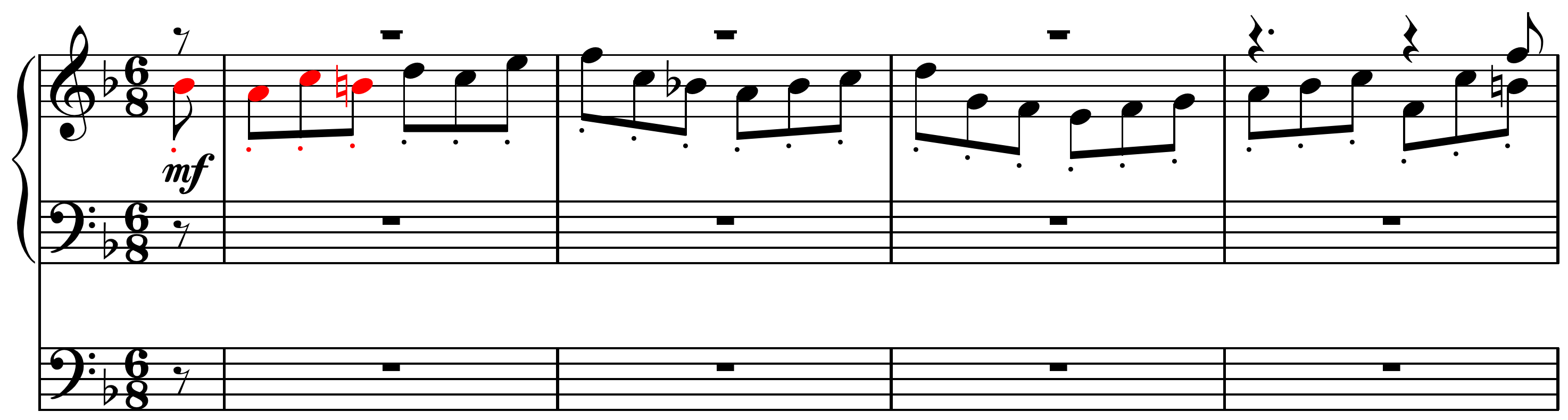
Schumann, Sechs Fugen for organ, Op. 60, No. 5, mm. 1–4 The motif may be used in different ways: here it is only the beginning of an extended melody.

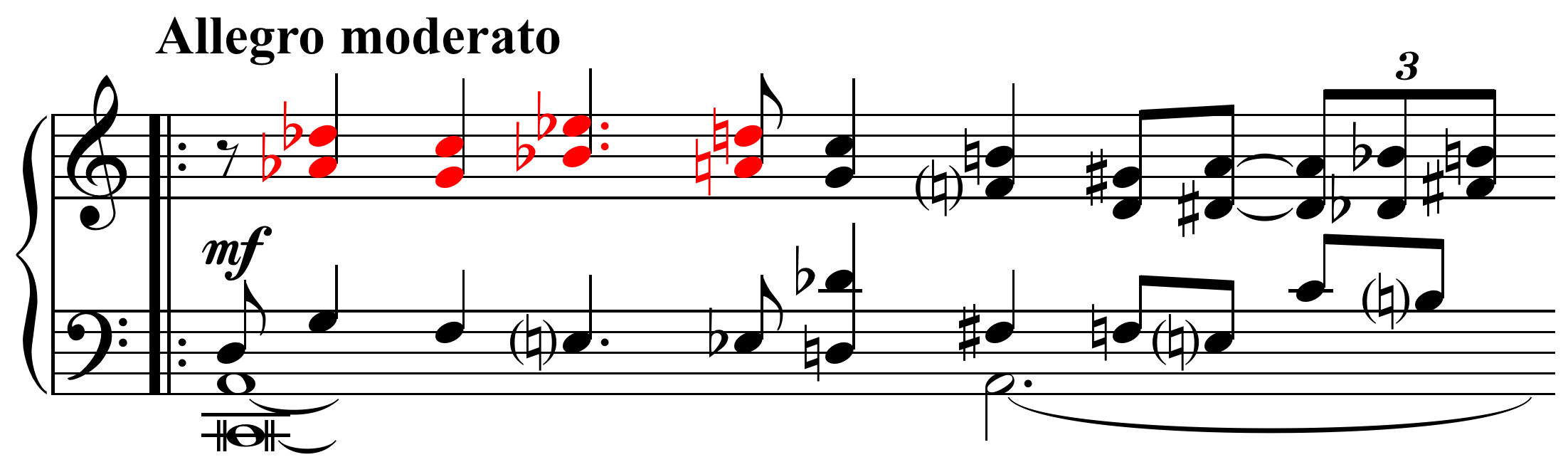
Charles Ives, 3-Page Sonata (1905), first mvt., first fugal complex The BACH motif from The Art of Fugue Contrapunctus XIXc is the "1st Theme'/fugue subject" of Ives' combined sonata-allegro and fugal procedures.

Webern's String Quartet, Op. 28, tone row, composed of three tetrachords: P I RI, with P = the BACH motif, I = it inverted, and RI = it inverted and backwards.

The motif was used as a fugue subject by Bach's son Johann Christian, and by his pupil Johann Ludwig Krebs. It also appears in a work by Georg Philipp Telemann.

The motif's wide popularity came only after the start of the Bach Revival in the first half of the 19th century. A few mid-19th century works that feature the motif prominently are:

- 1845 – Robert Schumann: Sechs Fugen über den Namen: Bach, for organ, pedal piano, or harmonium, Op. 60
- 1855 – Franz Liszt: Fantasy and Fugue on the Theme B-A-C-H, for organ (later revised, 1870, and arranged, 1871, for piano)
- 1856 – Johannes Brahms: Fugue in A-flat minor for organ, WoO 8
- 1878 – Nicolai Rimsky-Korsakov – Valse, Intermezzo, Scherzo, Nocturne, Prelude et Fugue (Six Variations) sur le thème B–A–C–H

Composers found that the motif could be easily incorporated not only into the advanced harmonic writing of the 19th century, but also into the totally chromatic idiom of the Second Viennese School; so it was used by Arnold Schoenberg, Anton Webern, and their disciples and followers. A few 20th-century works that feature the motif prominently are:

- 1926–28 – Arnold Schoenberg: Variations for Orchestra, Op. 31
- 1937–38 – Anton Webern: String Quartet (the tone row is based on the BACH motif)
- 1942 – Charles Koechlin: Offrande musicale sur le nom de Bach, Op. 187
- 1951–55 – Luigi Dallapiccola:
  - 1951–55: "Canti di liberazione"
  - 1952: Quaderno musicale di Annalibera for piano
  - 1954: Variazioni ("Variations" 1942, orchestral version of Quaderno musicale di Annalibera)
- 1966 – Krzysztof Penderecki: St Luke Passion
- 1968–81 – Alfred Schnittke:
  - 1968:
    - The Glass Harmonica soundtrack (repeated motif)
    - Quasi Una Sonata (repeated motif borrowed from The Glass Harmonica, one reviewer, "noting that B–A–C–H is the victor of the composition")
  - 1981: Symphony No. 3 – used alongside the monograms of several other composers.
- 1971–2000 – Bertold Hummel:
  - 1971: Metamorphoses on B-A-C-H for Organ and winds op. 40
  - 2000: Aphorisms on B-A-C-H for Percussion solo and Strings, op. 105
- 1974 – Jon Lord and Eberhard Schoener: Continuo On B.A.C.H. on the album Windows
- 1992 – Ron Nelson: Passacaglia (Homage on B–A–C–H) for wind ensemble

In the 21st century, composers continue writing works using the motif, frequently in homage to Johann Sebastian Bach. , among others :

- 2014 - Santiago Lanchares: Sobre BACH for piano solo
- 2015 - Ananda Sukarlan: Fantasy & Fugue on B.A.C.H for piano solo (commissioned by Fundacion Juan March, Madrid)

== Sources ==
- Brandstätter, Ursula [in German] (1990). "Hans Heinrich Eggebrechts deutung der 'Kunst der Fuge' von J. S. Bach" [Hans Heinrich Eggebrecht's interpretation of 'The Art of Fugue' by J. S. Bach]. Musik im Spiegel der Sprache: Theorie und Analyse des Sprechens über Musik [Music reflected in language: theory and analysis of the discourse about music] (in German) (eBook ed.). Springer (published 2017). pp. 163–180. ISBN 9783476044600.
- Cumming, Naomi (2000). "8. Culturally Embedded Signs", subsection "2. Skeptical Issues", part "a. Humpty Dumpty and the New Musicology". The Sonic Self: Musical Subjectivity and Signification. Indiana University Press. pp. 254–258. ISBN 0253337542.
- Eggebrecht, Hans Heinrich (1985) [1984]. Bachs Kunst der Fuge: Erscheinung und Deutung (in German) (4th ed.). Noetzel (published 1998). ISBN 379590725X.
- Eggebrecht, Hans Heinrich (1993). J.S. Bach's The Art of Fugue: The Work and Its Interpretation. Translated by Prater, Jeffrey L. Iowa State University Press. ISBN 0813814898.
- Kivy, Peter (2000). "'Absolute Music' and the 'New Musicology'". In Greer, David; Rumbold, Ian [at Wikidata]; King, Jonathan (eds.). Musicology and Sister Disciplines: Past, Present, Future. Oxford University Press. pp. 378–388. ISBN 0198167342.
- Orledge, Robert (1989). Charles Koechlin (1867–1950) His Life and Works. Harwood Academic Publishers. ISBN 3-7186-0609-7. OCLC 18833927.
