= Canonic Variations on "Vom Himmel hoch da komm' ich her" =

Organ composition by Johann Sebastian Bach

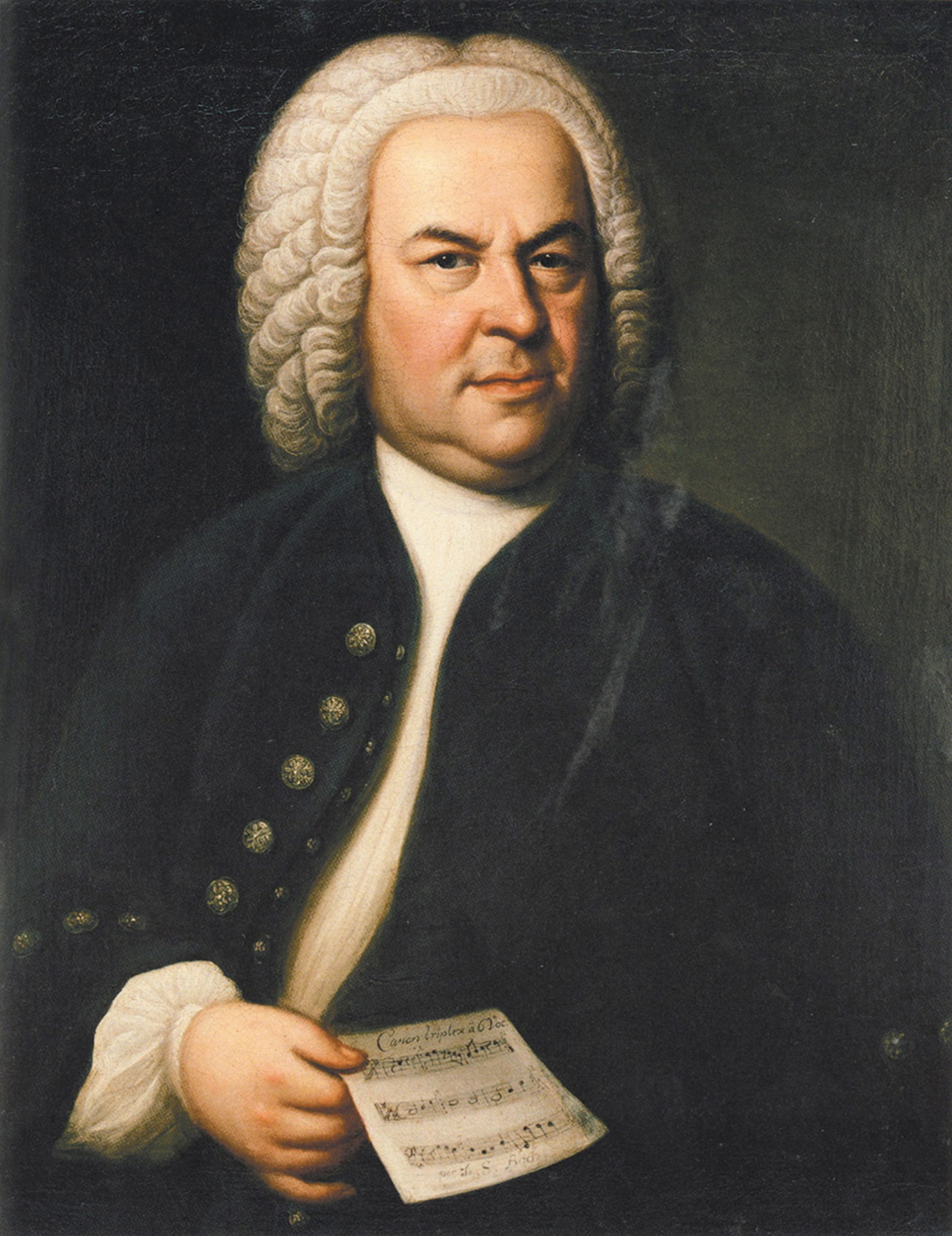
Johann Sebastian Bach in 1746, holding his canon triplex a 6 voci, BWV 1076. Oil painting by Elias Gottlob Haussmann.

The Canonic Variations on "Vom Himmel hoch da komm' ich her" ("From Heaven above to Earth I come"), BWV 769, are a set of five variations in canon for organ with two manuals and pedals by Johann Sebastian Bach on the Christmas hymn by Martin Luther of the same name. The variations were prepared as a showpiece for Bach's entry as fourteenth member of Mizler's Music Society in Leipzig in 1747. The original printed edition of 1747, in which only one line of the canon was marked in the first three variations, was published by Balthasar Schmid in Nuremberg. Another version BWV 769a appears in the later autograph manuscript P 271, which also contains the six trio sonatas for organ BWV 525–530 and the Great Eighteen Chorale Preludes BWV 651–668. In this later version Bach modified the order of the variations, moving the fifth variation into a central position, and wrote out all the parts in full, with some minor revisions to the score.

These [variations] are full of passionate vitality and poetical feeling. The heavenly hosts soar up and down, their lovely song sounding out over the cradle of the Infant Christ, while the multitude of the redeemed "join the sweet song with joyful hearts." But the experiences of a fruitful life of sixty years have interwoven themselves with the emotions which possessed him in earlier years ... The work has an element of solemn thankfulness, like the gaze of an old man who watches his grandchildren standing round their Christmas tree, and is reminded of his own childhood.

— Philipp Spitta, Johann Sebastian Bach, Vol. II, 1880 (translation: Vol. III, page 221).

The brilliant scale passages not only represent the ascending and descending angels, but sound joyous peals from many belfries ringing in the Saviour's birth.

— Charles Sanford Terry, Bach's Chorals, page 307, Vol. 3, 1921.

== Movements ==
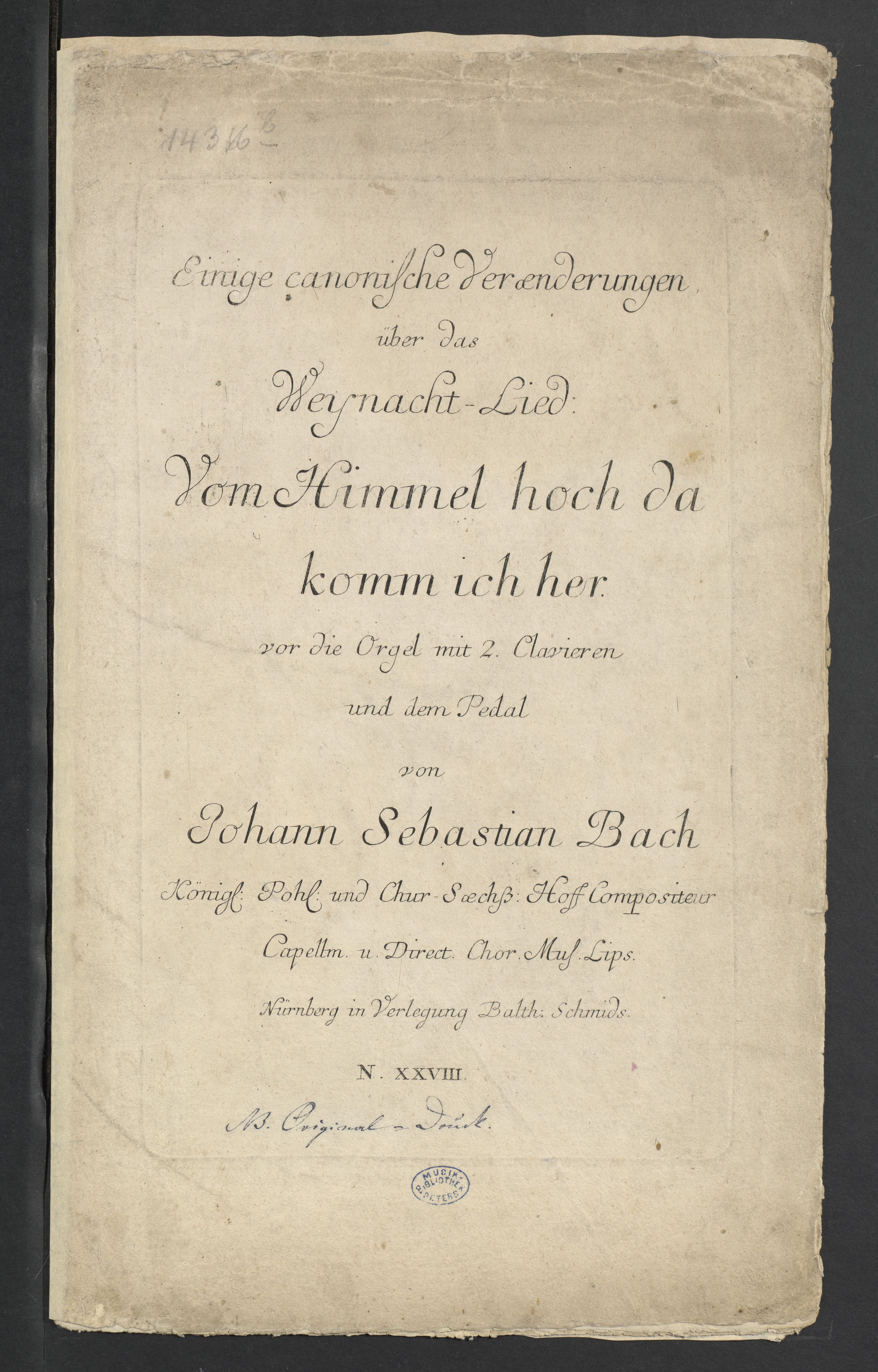
Title page of BWV 769

The title page of the printed version BWV 769 reads

Einige canonische Veraenderungen über das Weynacht-Lied: Vom Himmel hoch da komm ich her, vor die Orgel Mit 2. Clavieren und dem Pedal von Johann Sebastian Bach Königl: Pohl: Und chur Saechss: Hoff Compositeur Capellm. u. Direct. Chor.Mus. Lips. Nürnberg in Verlegung Balth: Schmids.

In English translation this reads

Some Canonic Variations on the Christmas hymn "From Heaven above to Earth I come". For organ with two manuals and pedal, by Johann Sebastian Bach, Royal Polish and Electoral Saxon Court Composer, Kapellmeister and Director of the Musical Ensemble, Leipzig. Nuremberg, published by Balthasar Schmid.

There are five variations:

1. Canone all' ottava (Canon at the Octave)
2. Alio Modo in Canone alla Quinta (Canon at the Fifth)
3. Canone alla Settima, cantabile (Canon at the Seventh)
4. Canon per augmentationem (Augmentation Canon)
5. L'altra Sorte del'Canone all'rovercio, 1) alla Sesta, 2) alla Terza, 3) alla Seconda è 4) alla Nona (Canon with Inversions)

In BWV 769a, the variations occur in the modified order 1, 2, 5, 3, 4.

== History, origins and genesis ==
In June 1747 he entered the Society for the Musical Sciences ... He presented to the Society the chorale "Vom Himmel hoch da komm' ich her" completely worked out, and this was afterwards engraved in copper.

— Lorenz Christoph Mizler, 1754

In June 1747, Bach was admitted as the fourteenth member of the "Correspondierende Societät der musicalischen Wissenschaften" (Corresponding Society for the Musical Sciences), a society devoted to musical scholarship founded in Leipzig in 1738 by Lorenz Christoph Mizler. To mark his admission he not only presented a version of the Canonic Variations, but also a portrait by Elias Gottlob Haussmann in which Bach holds a copy of his canon triplex a 6 voci BWV 1076 towards the viewer. During the last ten years of his life, Bach had become preoccupied musically with canons and canonic fugues, already much developed in the Parts III and IV of the Clavier-Übung—the Organ Mass BWV 552, BWV 669–689, the four canonic duets BWV 802–805 and the Goldberg Variations BWV 988—as well as the Musical Offering BWV 1079 and the Art of the Fugue BWV 1080. The triplex canon itself became part of the Fourteen Canons BWV 1087, preserved in one surviving copy of the Goldberg Variations. Mizler seems to have been unaware of the numerological significance that the number fourteen had to Bach (B+A+C+H=14).

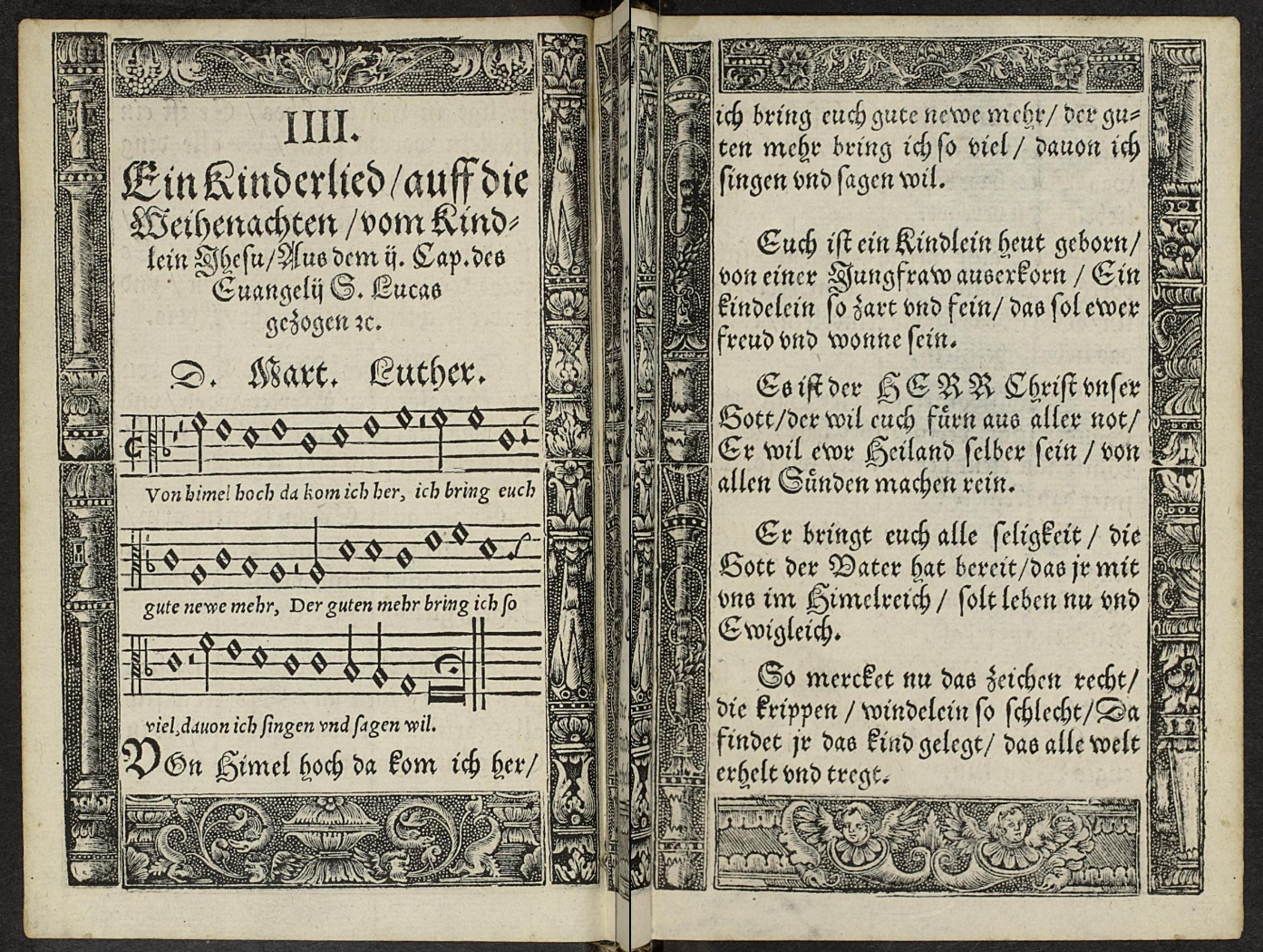
Martin Luther: Vom Himmel hoch da komm' ich her, Bapst Gesangbuch in Leipzig, 1567

The Canonic Variations are based on the Christmas Hymn "Vom Himmel hoch, da komm ich her", for which text and melody, both by Martin Luther, were published in 1539:

The chorale itself was set three times by Bach in his Christmas Oratorio, BWV 248, and before that as an addition for Christmas in his Magnificat in E-flat major, BWV 243a. Bach also used the hymn melody in earlier chorale preludes, notably BWV 606 (Orgelbüchlein), 700, 701 and 738, with accompanying motifs above and below the melodic line that were to recur in BWV 769. There are also similarities with several of the Goldberg Variations, notably the third and thirteenth, with shared motifs, keyboard technique and general structure. In the case of the earlier harpsichord work, however, the variations are written over a fixed bass line, while BWV 769 is based on a melody.

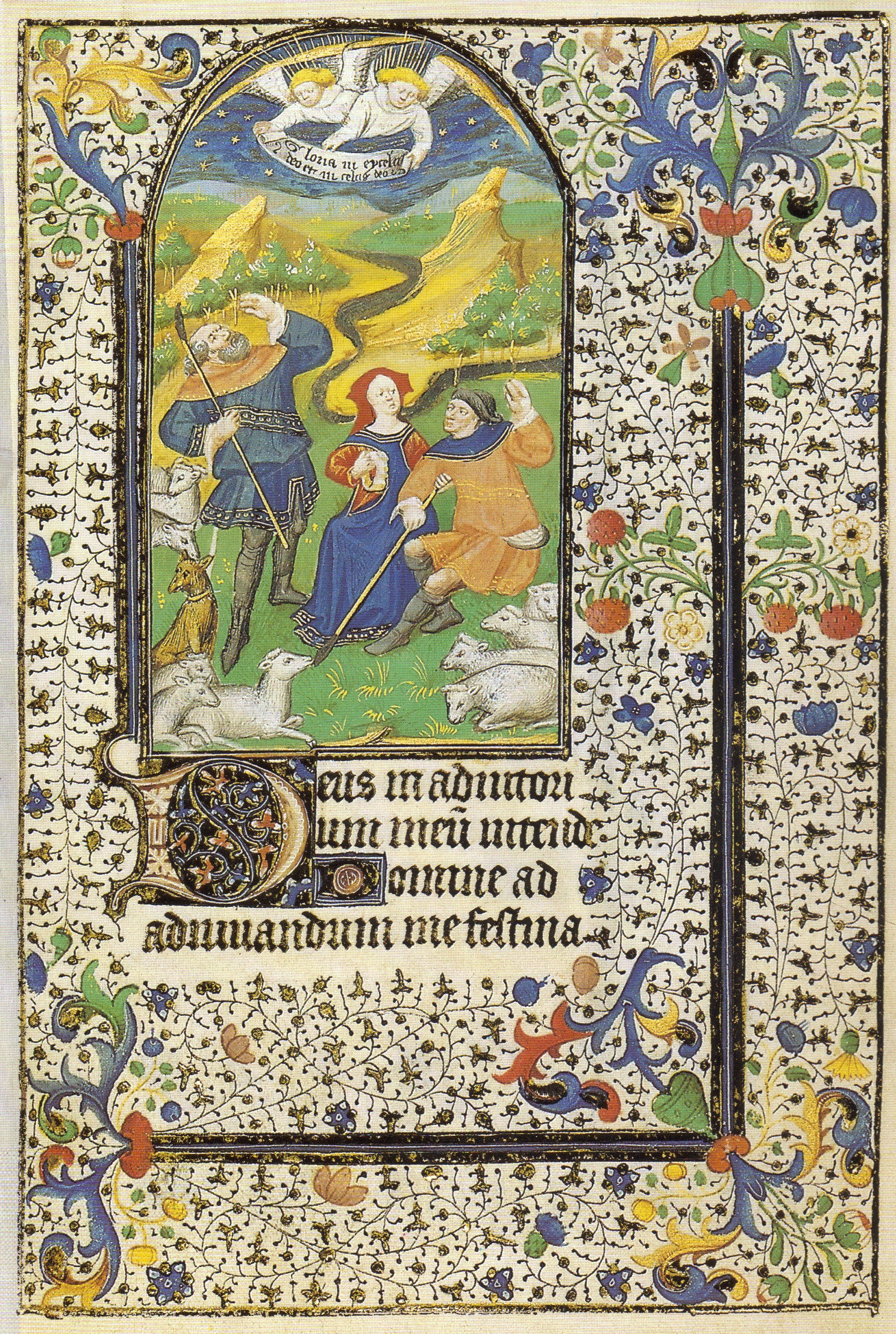
Annunciation to the shepherds, 15C book of hours, Mainz

During this period Bach had been criticized vociferously by the Danish composer Johann Adolph Scheibe for producing music that was too old-fashioned, abstract and artificial. Scheibe had described Bach's output as "altogether too much art" and had referred to the canons as outmoded follies ("Thorheiten"). However, despite the logic of the canon that underlies the Canonic Variations, Bach succeeded in producing a work which, far from being abstract and severe, was imbued with an affect of "beauty" and "naturalness", quite modern for its time and in keeping with the spirit of galante music. The musical language of Bach in BWV 769 is as different from his other organ music as that of the Goldberg Variations is from his earlier harpsichord music. Combining complex counterpoint with the spiritual associations of Advent and Christmas, Bach's harmony and keyboard technique produce a musical style "at times strangely new, at others very approachable" yet "elusive enough to prompt admirers to search outside music for suitable expressive metaphor." As Williams (2003, p. 518) puts it, the "canons create harmonies, melodies and progressions not only otherwise unheard but strangely rapt and intense."

Various stylistic elements in the Canonic Variations recall the compositions of Bach's predecessors and contemporaries. The running figures in the first variation can be found in Toccata No.12 of Georg Muffat (1690) and in the keyboard sonatas of Domenico Scarlatti. The canon in the second variation is close in spirit to the Canons Mélodieux for two instruments of Georg Philipp Telemann. The galant figures of the free line in the third variation are similar to those promoted by Joachim Quantz in his 1752 treatise on flute playing. The elaborate ornamentation of the fourth variation uses many devices from his son Carl Philipp Emanuel Bach's treatise on keyboard technique (1753, 1762); the final pedal point harks back to those of the chorale preludes of Dieterich Buxtehude, for example in his setting of "Durch Adams Fall ist ganz verdebt", BuxWV 183. The walking pedal-bass beneath the canon at the beginning of the fifth variation is similar to Georg Friedrich Kaufmann's setting of "Vom Himmel hoch" in his Harmonische Seelenlust (c. 1733).

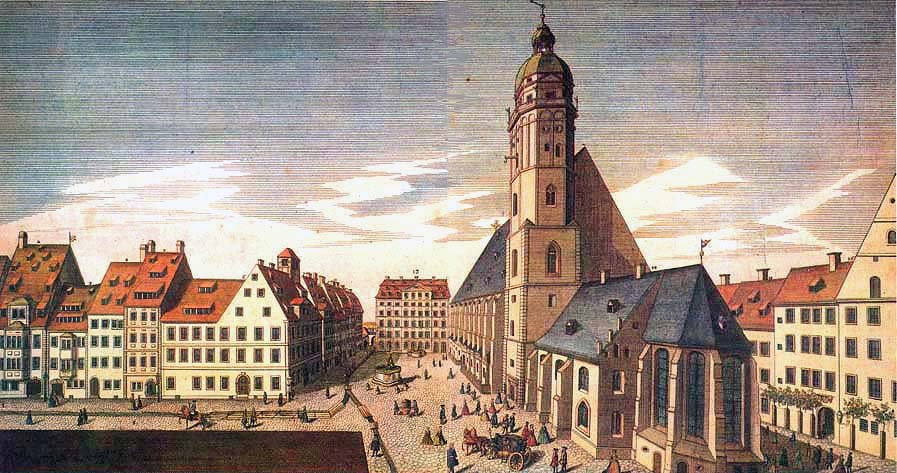
The Thomaskirche, Leipzig, 1735

Butler (2000) has examined the surviving manuscripts in detail to determine the manner in which the Canonic Variations were composed and published. A similar process was determined by Breig (2010). The only sources were Balthasar Schmid's engraving and Bach's autograph manuscript, a much larger collection referred to as P271. In addition there were further manuscripts of Bach, used for rough working and sketches, which have not survived. The chronology shows that four of the five variations were engraved halfway through 1746, starting with Variatio I, II and III, and ending with Variatio V. Only in 1747, after a year had elapsed, was Variatio IV engraved. As a consequence, not all of the variations could have been performed by Mizler at the Society; and, in Hans Klotz's 1957 critical report of the NBA, it could not have been possible for an initial printing of Variatio I, II, III and IV, followed by a later expanded version of Variatio V.

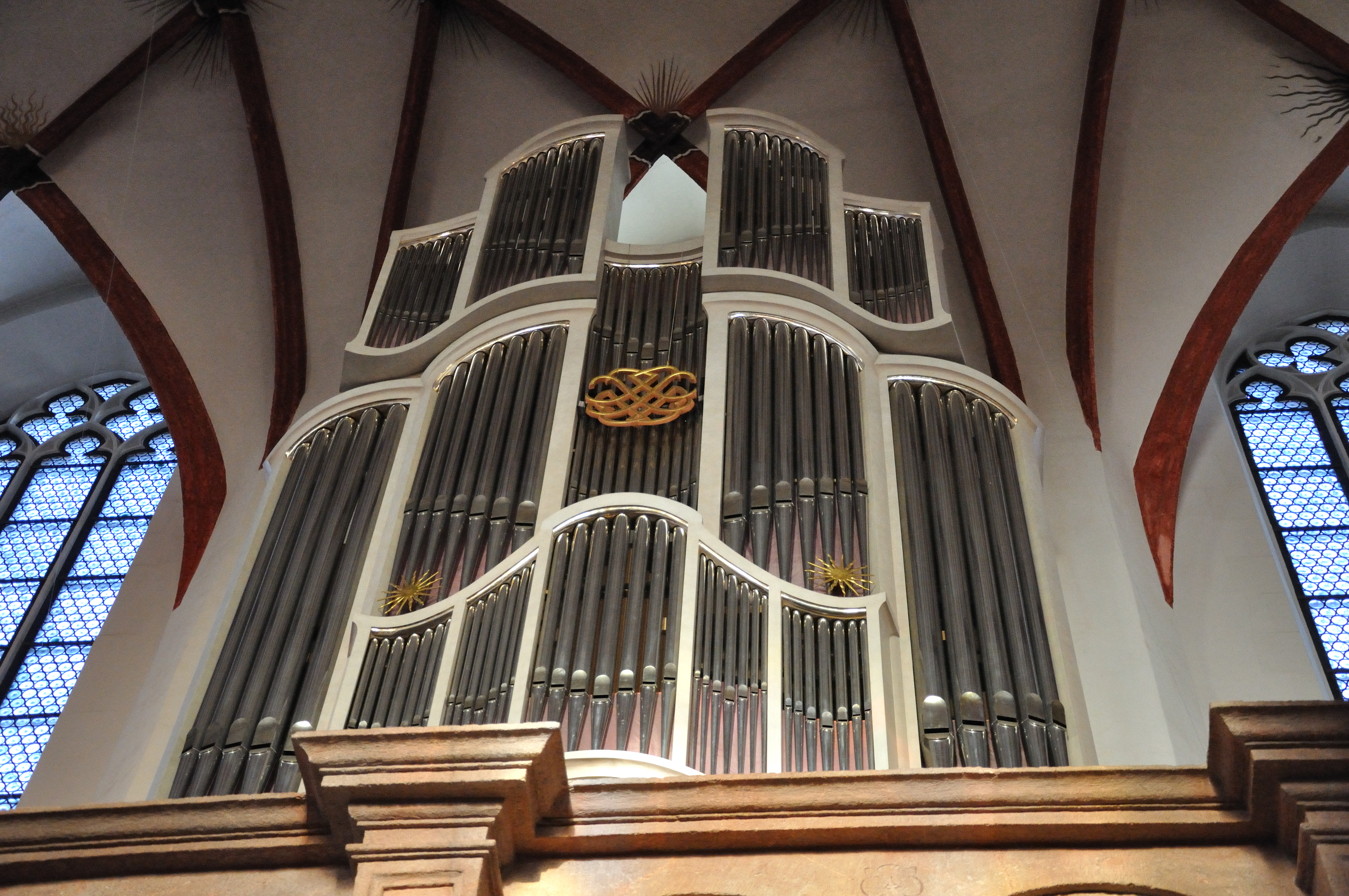
The small organ in the Thomaskirche in Leipzig, where Bach was organist and kantor 1723–1750. The organ, with its gilt Bach monogram, is a reconstruction by Gerald Woehl of a baroque organ played by Bach in the Paulinerkirche

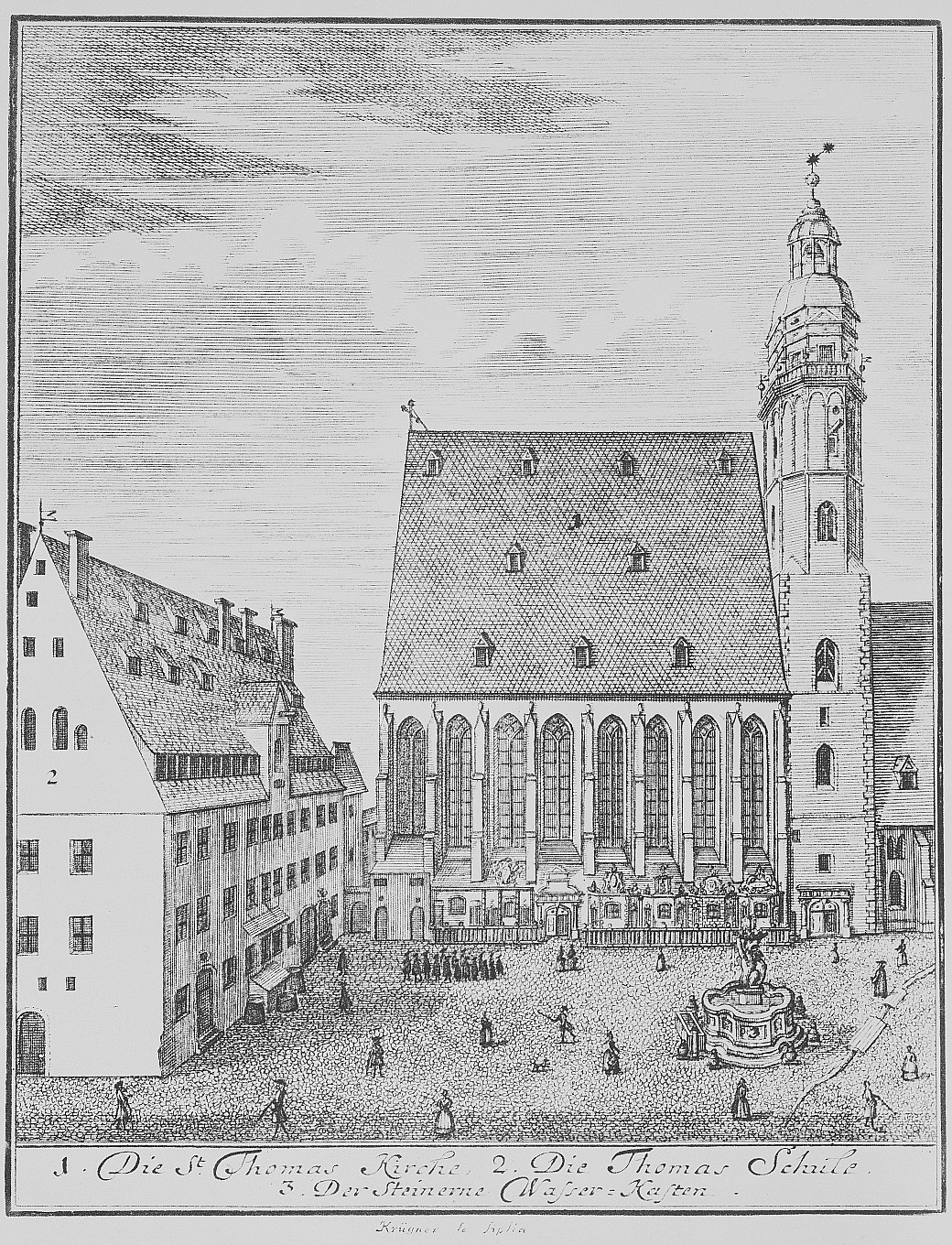
Engraving of the Thomaskirche and Thomasschule in Leipzig in 1723, where Bach was appointed Thomaskantor

The Canonic Variations seem to have been composed, not necessarily in their final form, in 1746 or at least for the New Year's Fair of 1747. In the engraved version the first three variations, written in annotated form, could not be performed directly from the copy, since only one part of the canon was provided, the other having to be worked out "with the pen at home". For variations 1–3, the annotation of canons involved suppressing the second canonic entry, so that the scoring becomes a puzzle, sometimes referred to as an "enigma" or a "riddle". As Breig (2010) speculates, it might have been that the first three variations initially comprised some form of presentation; one suitable festive occasion, appropriate for such a performance, would have been the baptism of Bach's grandson Johann August, celebrated in early December 1745. The engraved version was also probably devised to minimize page turns and economize on space, so the combination of these factors speaks against any particular significance in the order of the movements. It is also not clear which of the remaining two canons was prepared specially for Mizler's Society.

The exuberant Canon with Inversions (Variatio V) builds up to a cumulative climax, but originally did not contain the passing reference to the BACH motif in its closing bars. In the autograph manuscript, it becomes the central variation, comparable to the role played by the central large-scale sixteenth Goldberg variation. This variation in three separate sections was engraved after variations 1–3; it might have been intended to be placed between the 2nd and 3rd variations; and with four variations now at Bach's disposal, that marked a new stage in Bach's development, with the flourish in Variatio V starting to gain a sense of finality. The calmer Augmentation Canon (Variatio IV), on the other hand, similar to the thirteenth Goldberg variation, has a clear reference to the BACH motif in its 39th bar, its anguished harmonies resolved peacefully by the final pedal point. Because of continual reworkings, it is now believed that Bach never intended there to be a final fixed version. In particular, commentators have pointed out that although the order of the variations in the autograph version gives it a certain aesthetic symmetry, the order in the engraved version might be more appropriate for performance.

During a period of roughly 20 years of research, the musicologist Tatlow (2015) has developed her own theory of numerology and proportion with reference to Bach's compositions. Based on what she has termed "proportional parallelism," Tatlow has described three uniform features: firstly the total number of bars in printed or manuscript works are multiples of tens, hundreds or thousands; secondly the initials of Bach and various family members correspond numerically, using an alphabetical code, to meaningfully identified values, such as 14 (for B=2, A=1, C=3 and H=8) and 41; and finally the total number of bars in major works of Bach can almost always be divided into proportions of 1:1 and 1:2. In the first part of Tatlow's book, there is an account of the eighteenth century from the viewpoint of musical theory and theology. The second part illustrates specific works or collections of works, including a detailed and lengthy discussion of the five variations in BWV 769 with six carefully tabulated figures.

== Text and translation ==
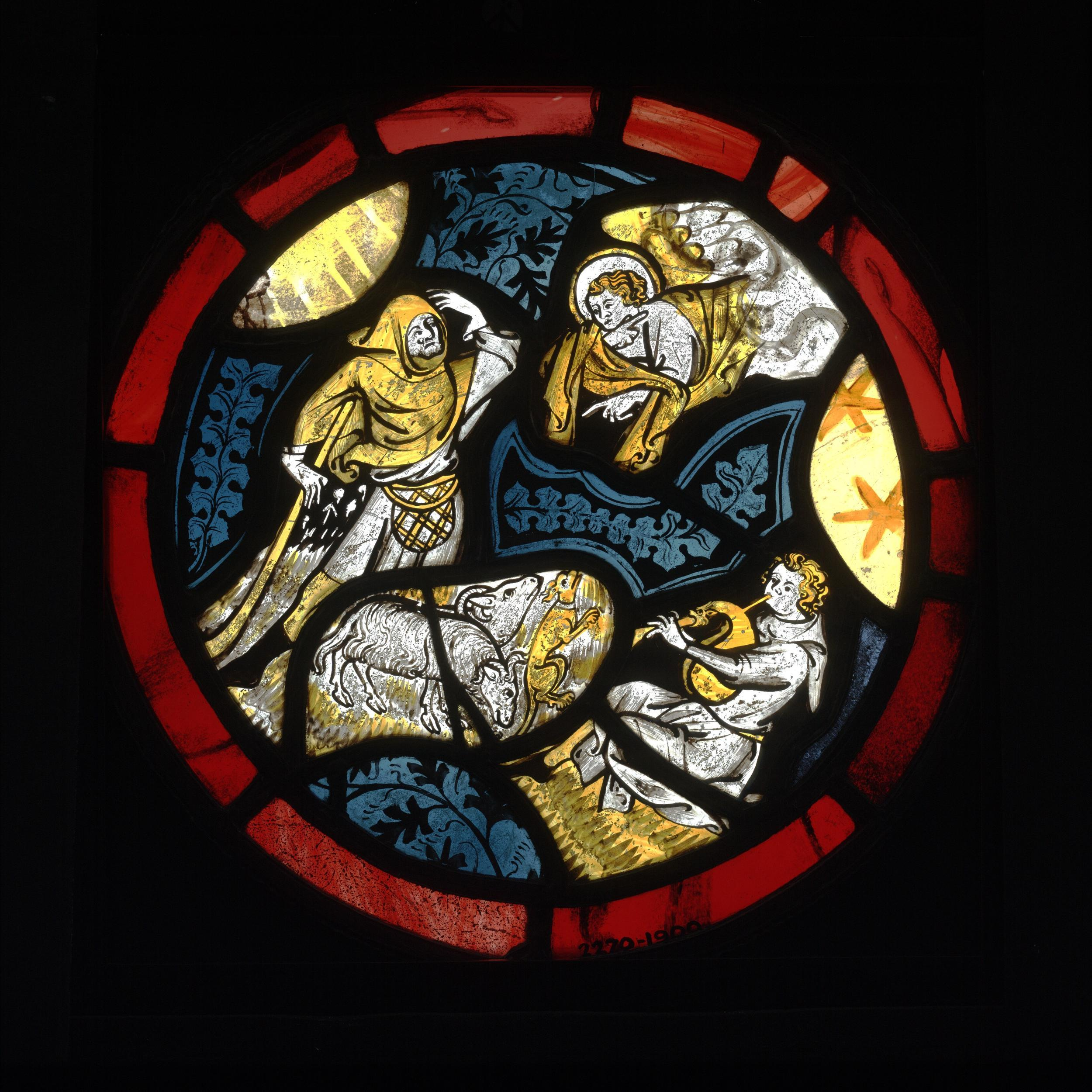
Annunciation to the Shepherds, English stained glass, c. 1340, Victoria and Albert Museum, London

Below are the first, second and last (fifteenth) verses of the Christmas hymn Vom Himmel hoch, da komm ich her by Martin Luther, published in 1539, with the English translation from 1855 of Catherine Winkworth.

Vom Himmel hoch, da komm ich her. Ich bring' euch gute neue Mär, Der guten Mär bring ich so viel, Davon ich singn und sagen will. Euch ist ein Kindlein heut' geborn Von einer Jungfrau auserkorn, Ein Kindelein, so zart und fein, Das soll eu'r Freud und Wonne sein. Lob, Ehr sei Gott im höchsten Thron, Der uns schenkt seinen ein'gen Sohn. Des freuen sich der Engel Schar Und singen uns solch neues Jahr.	From Heaven above to earth I come To bear good news to every home; Glad tidings of great joy I bring Whereof I now will say and sing: To you this night is born a child Of Mary, chosen mother mild; This little child, of lowly birth, Shall be the joy of all your earth. Glory to God in highest Heaven, Who unto man His Son hath given! While angels sing with pious mirth A glad New Year to all the earth.

== Musical structure ==
The descriptions below are based on the detailed analysis in Williams (2003), Yearsley (2002) and Butt (2008).

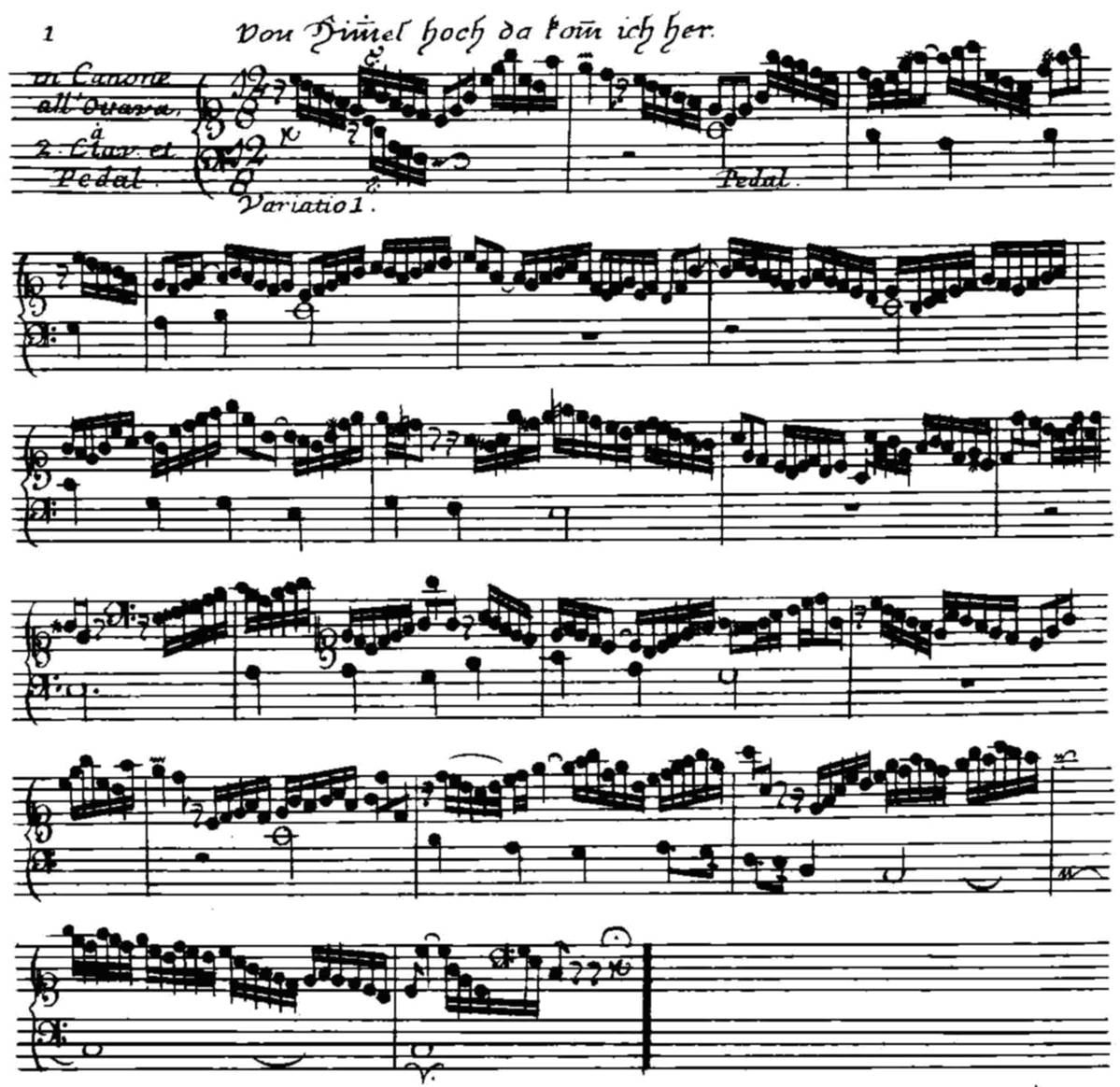
Printed version of first variation of BWV 769

=== Variatio I ===
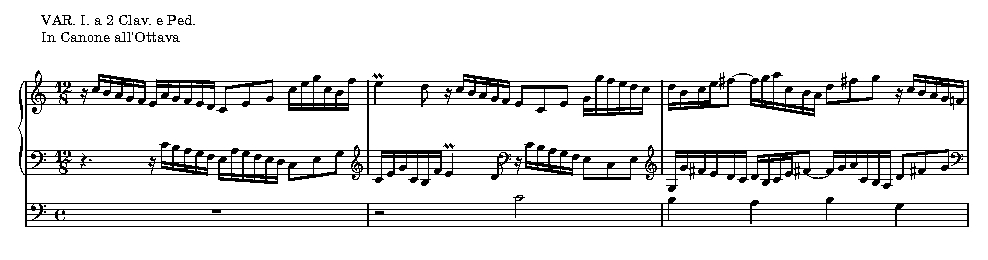

The two part canon is derived from the first and last lines of the cantus firmus. Despite the "enigmatic" notation for the printed version in the canon, Bach's musical style gives the impression of simplicity, gracefulness and beauty: no disharmony disturbs the pervading mood of peacefulness. The descending scale with which it starts is similar to the accompanying figures in Christe, du Lamm Gottes, BWV 619, of the Orgelbüchlein. The falling scales have been interpreted as representing Christ's descent from Heaven to Earth, a reference to the text of the last verse. The repetition in the text "glad tidings of great joy" (lines 2–3, verse 1) provides a similar repetition for the music in the canon. The involved semiquaver passages with octave imitations, along with the slowly progressing harmonies, create an effect of resonant and echoing solemnity. Bach avoids monotony and lack of pace by modulating into the minor, followed by a brief G-major passage in the third line of the cantus firmus. The graceful introductory ritornello is recapitulated before the last line of the pedal cantus firmus, played in the tenor register with an 8' stop.

=== Variatio II ===
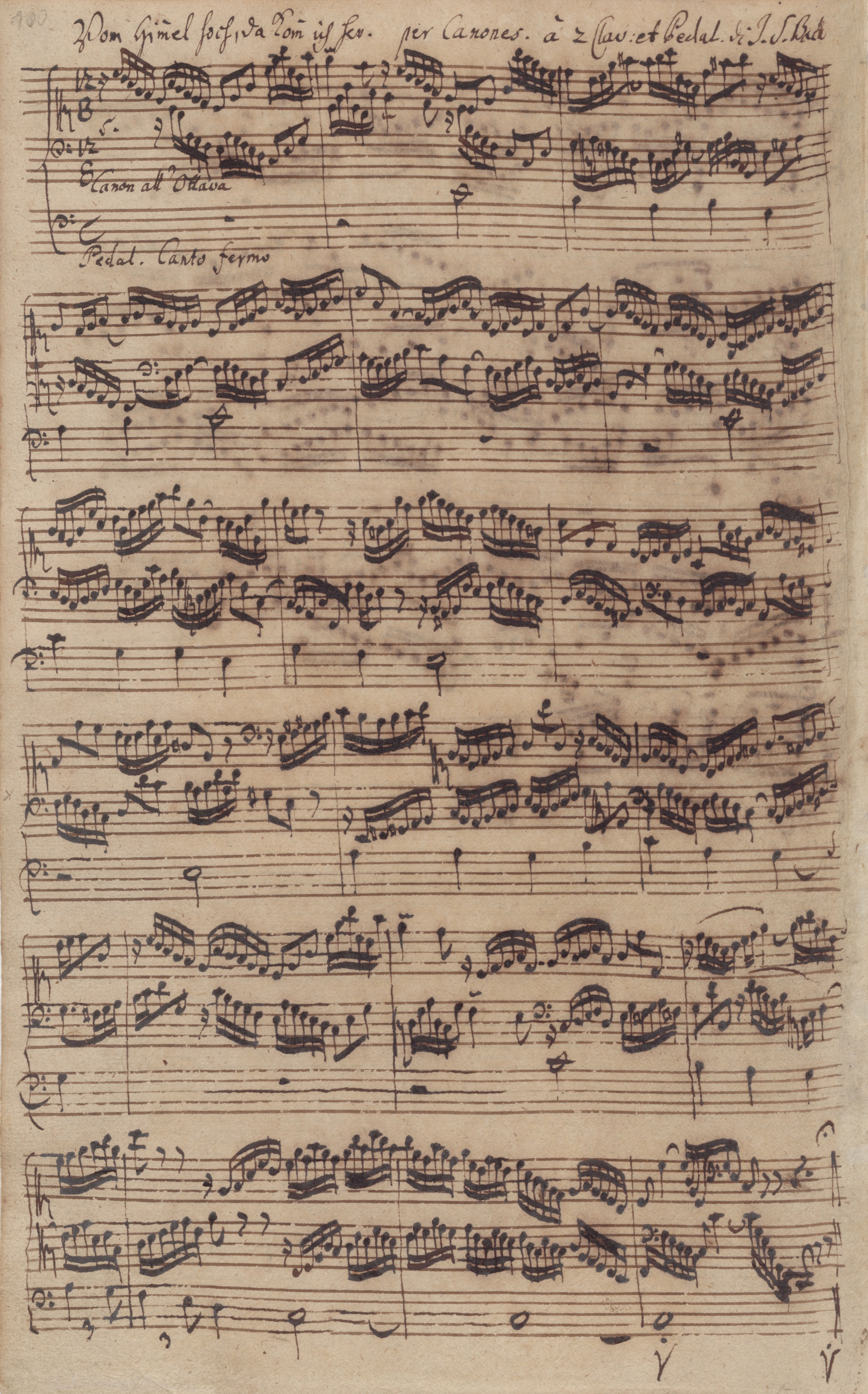
Autograph manuscript of first variation of BWV 769a

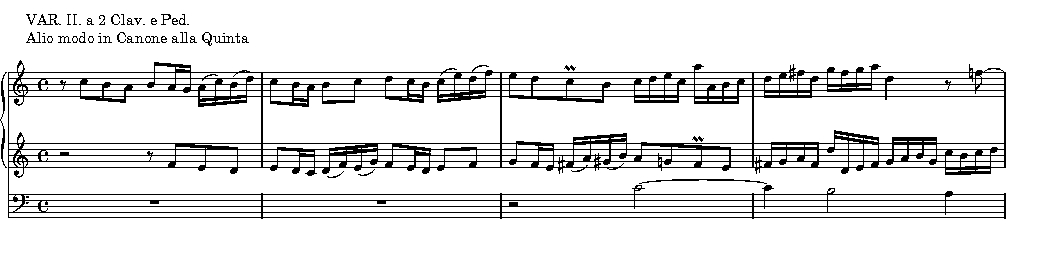

The two part canon is based on the first and second lines of the cantus firmus. The compact imitative passagework follows the same scheme as Variatio I, but now with the canon at the fifth. Again the antiquated "puzzle" notation for the canon in the printed version belies the modern "natural" style, with pleasant writing and graceful slurs. The imitation follows a different pattern, less expansive with a shorter scale, the two distinct motifs answering in turn. With 23 bars in Variatio II compared to 18 in Variatio I, there is far more tonal variety, e.g. the minor modulation in bar 3. The secondary motive emerges from semiquaver figures on parallel thirds: beginning with bar 9, these develop into a climax at the start of bar 16 in the cantus firmus. The articulation of both the print and autograph versions give a calmer impression of the semiquavers in Variatio II than in Variatio I. From the last quaver of bar 4, suspensions start to appear in Variatio II; further on, Bach's suspensions in the descending scales also hint at the beginning of Variatio I. As in Variatio I, there is a recapitulation of the opening ritornello—but now in syncopation with faster note values—before the last line of the cantus firmus, which is it at the same registration. The spirited rising scales above the closing pedal point are in contrast with the falling arpeggios at the end of Variatio I. The ascending scales at the coda of Variatio II have been interpreted as departing angels or the rising up of the soul (again a reference to the last verse of the text).

=== Variatio III ===
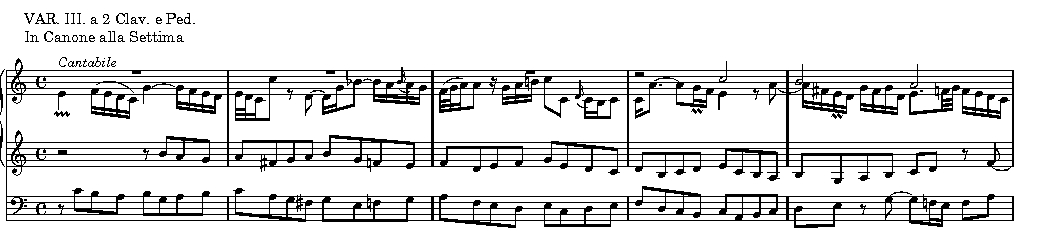

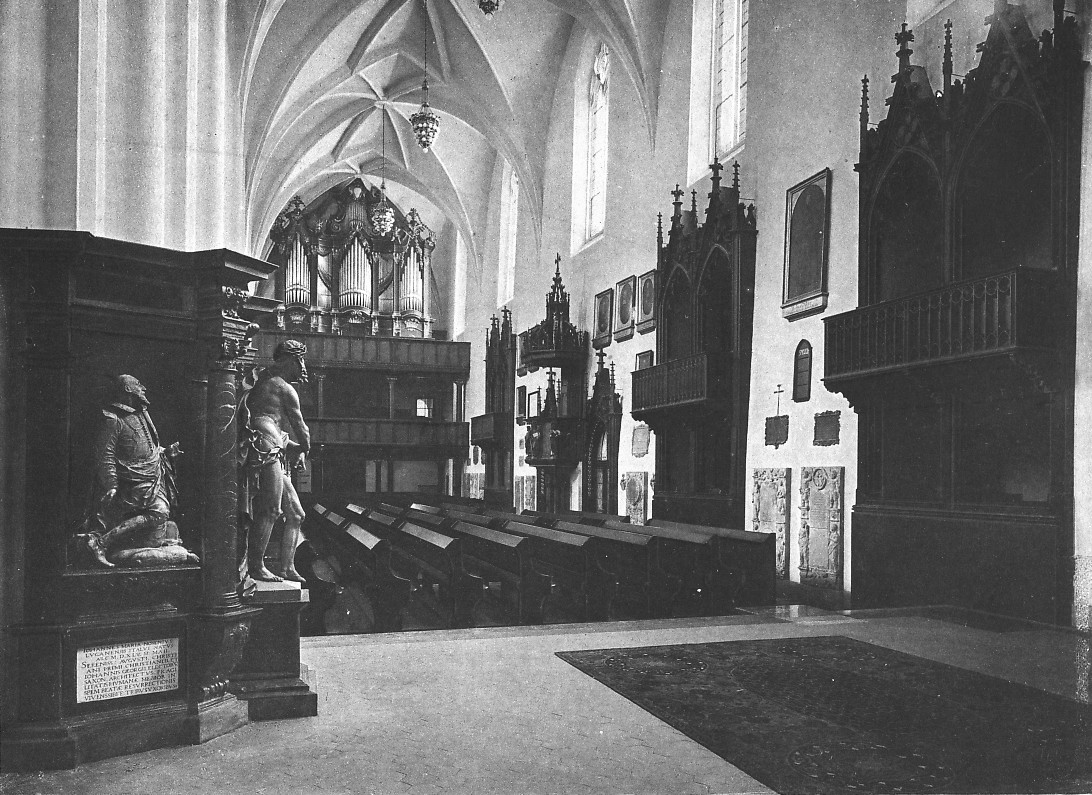
Silbermann Organ, Sophienkirche, Dresden

Variatio III is a longer composition lasting 27 bars. With the lower tenor and bass voices of the canons functioning as an accompaniment, the tenor entry is again delayed by two crotchets. The melody in the alto is marked cantabile in both the printed and autograph versions, with the soprano cantus firmus starting in even minims on the upbeat of bar 4. The canons themselves take the form of an ostinato ritornello derived from the first line of the cantus firmus with interludes when the cantus firmus recurs. The two canons framing Variatio II and III are similar, the suspensions developing in the same way. In contrast the musical material in the cantabile passagework contains a remarkable range of expressive figures typical of the modern galante style, with elaborate ornamentation, melismatic episodes and occasional dissonant appoggiaturas, resembling the solo part in an aria. It also has similarities with the figurations in the solo line of the slow movement of the F minor harpsichord concerto, BWV 1056. Amongst the notable ornamentation are the "sighing" suspensions and the syncopated anapaests (played rapidly on the beat). The cantabile melody was the most significant difference between the printed and manuscript version. Bach's practice was freely to extemporise on ornamentation, so that no performance was the same. From all the versions of the second line of the chorale, the musical intensity increased, with shorter and more frequent motives: the most intense dissonance occurs at bar 19, coloured with a winding chromaticism. Similarly to Variatio II, there is a modulation to the subdominant at bar 26: in the pedal point, the rising figures of the cantabile melody contrast with the falling motives in the canon. In bar 19, the chromaticism of the two canonic parts evokes the dragging of the cross (another example of musical iconography); the tensions of this episode are gradually resolved as the variation comes to a peaceful and harmonious close.

In Variatio III, the third engraving of the printed text of BWV 769, Yearsley (2002) focuses on what he calls "the most modern of the set". The canon at the seventh is scored in regular quavers with the voices in the tenor (lower manual) and the bass (pedal). The "enigmatic" notation in the printed version simplifies the score, so that the cantabile part in the alto voice is easier to read. In this way Bach contrasts his antiquated way of notation with his modern style of writing. The upper manuals play the alto voice with the marking Cantabile, while the soprano voice plays the cantus firmus in plain minims. The lower voices in the canon, mostly play in intervals of thirds and sixths. Yearsley describes Bach's galante style—characteristic of the alto melody—as full of musical motives containing "spontaneous and unpredictable ornamentation". When simplified by the ornamentation, the basic notes in the "skeleton" are harmonious: it is the different ornaments—be they suspensions, trills or appoggiaturas—that cause disharmonies and create the expressive qualities of Bach's style. The musical theorist Scheibe, formerly a student of Bach, referred to this modern musical style as delicate Sachen ("delicate things"). In the case of Variatio III, particularly Bach's ornamentation at the close of bars 26–27, Yearsley describes the new style as "marking the apogee of this natural elegance".

=== Variatio IV ===
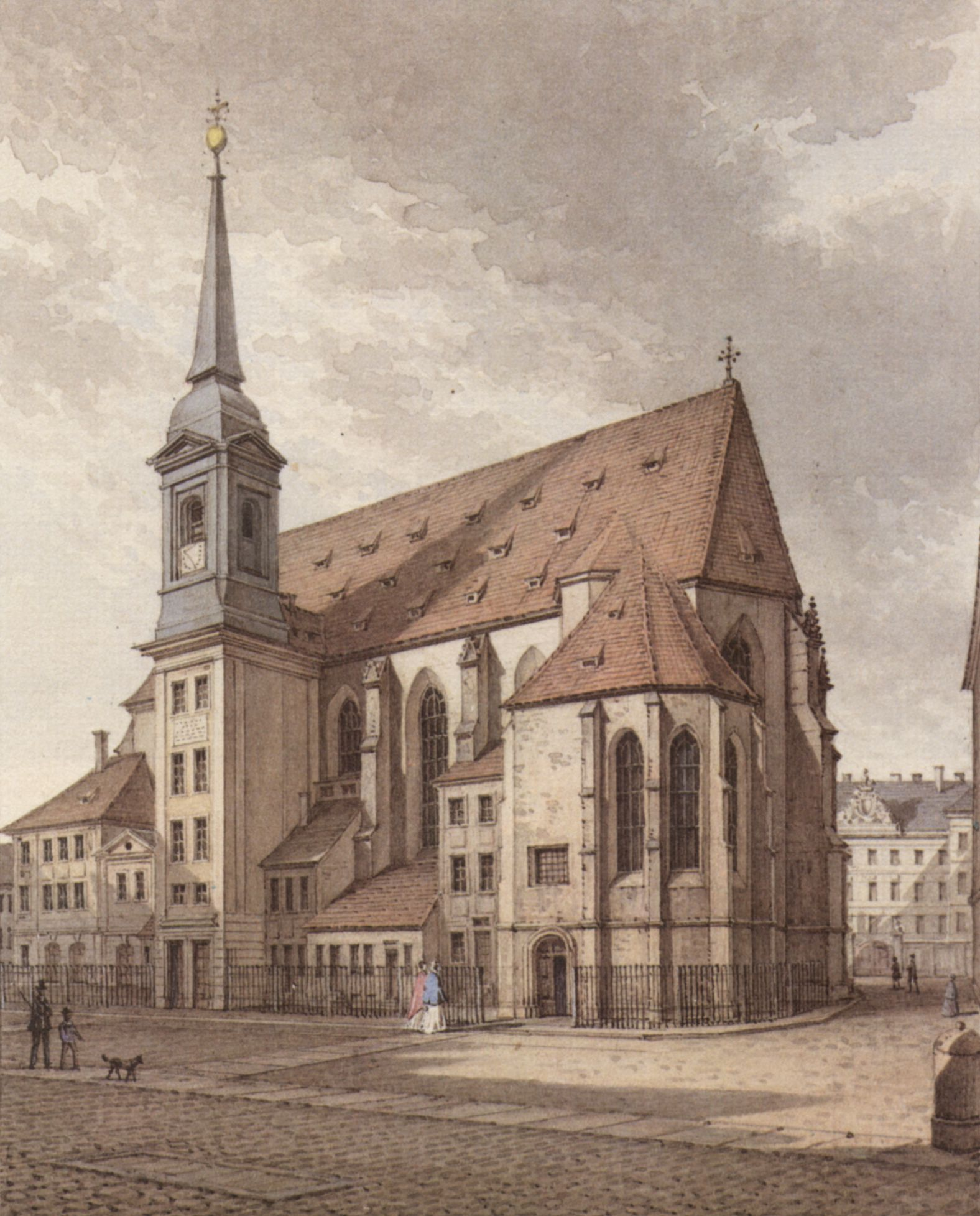
Sophienkirche, Dresden: C.J. Hammer, c.1850

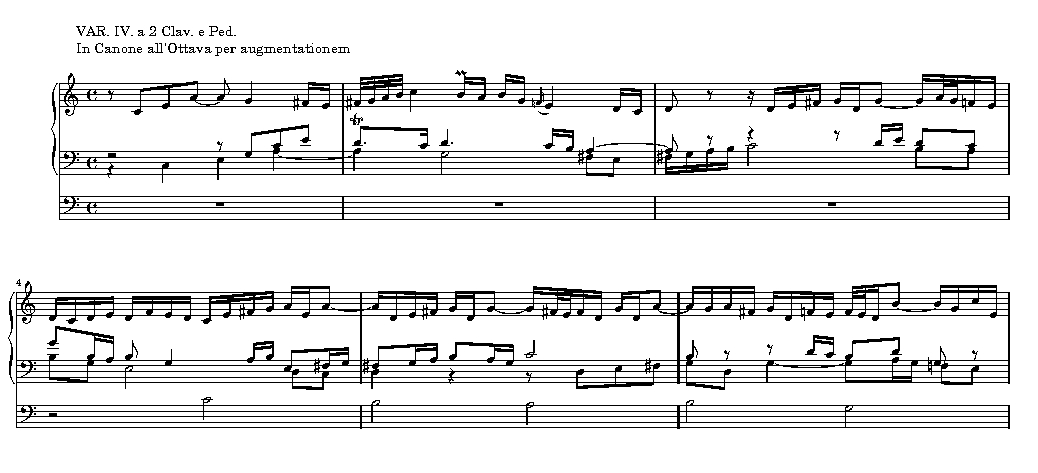

Variatio IV is an augmentation canon in the soprano and bass manuals. It places far greater demands on the compositional technique than the earlier 4-part Variatio III. The middle alto voice in Variatio IV now plays as an accompaniment, producing a remarkable motivic dialogue between the bass Comes canon.

Variatio IV takes the form of a newly composed melismatic arioso solo line in the right hand—elegant and elaborately ornamented—followed in the left hand by the bass canon at half the speed. Contrasting with the strict counterpoint of the steady bass part, the soprano voice adopts a modern expressive style, with freely added details, such as slurs, mordents, turns and appoggiaturas, that no longer conform to the rigid canon. Between the two voices of the canon is a free alto line, with the cantus firmus in the tenor. The alto voice sometimes rises above the soprano line, creating a "halo" effect. All three manual parts derive from elements of the cantus firmus. When these occur in the elaborate and unusual soprano line, these provide apparently new ways of hearing the melody of the chorale.

Variatio IV is more musically developed than Variatio III. The freely composed alto voice of Variatio III is now dominated by the soprano Dux canon in the upper manual of Variatio IV, with its many elaborate motives derived from the tenor cantus firmus. The main musical features in Variatio III—the ornamentation in the numerous motives and the lengthening phrases as if an imaginary vocal soloist is pausing between breaths—are intensified in Variatio IV. After completing the soprano canon in bar 21, Bach produces a freely composed line with extraordinarily long phrases and the same elaborately embellished texture. As a contrast, Bach then punctuates the long ornate phrases by a handful of brief and accented baroque motives: in bar 23, there is an unmistakable reprise of the Dux canon in the soprano voice serving as a baroque ritornello, brief and fragmentary, with diminutio semiquavers instead of quavers; there is an easily recognised quotation of the first lines of the cantus firmus, "Vom Himmel hoch da komm' ich her", in diminutio semiquavers instead of minims; and there is a further reprise of the short ritornello in bar 34.

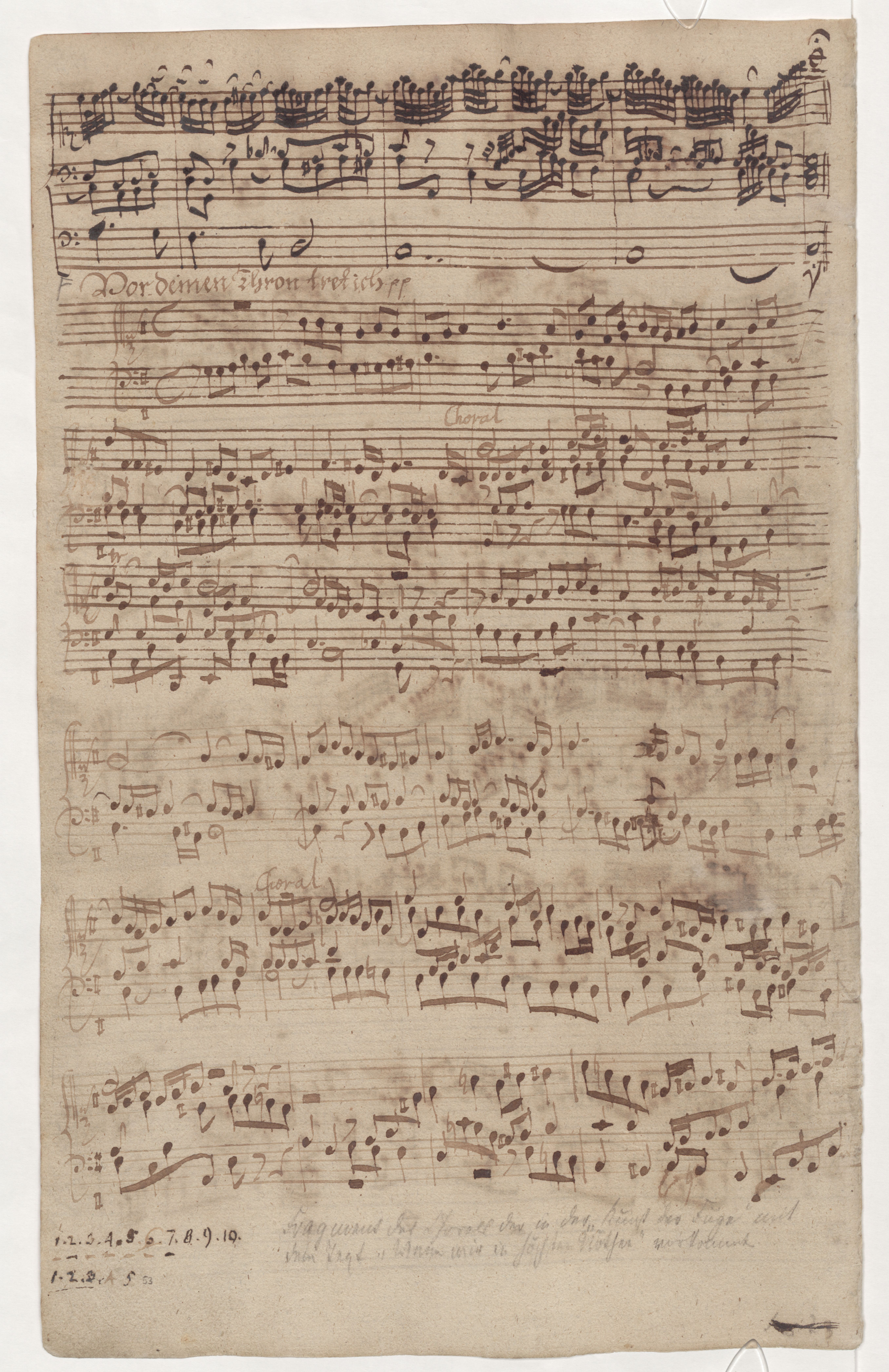
The last page of the autograph manuscript, BWV 769a, the closing bars of the canon per augumentationem. It ends manuscript collection P 271 with the surviving fragment of the so-called "deathbed chorale", Vor deinen Thron tret' ich, BWV 668 (not in Bach's handwriting).

According to Williams (2003), the compositional style is similar to that of the thirteenth Goldberg Variation, BWV 988, including the elaborate ornamentation of the soprano melody. The unusual change of instrumental timbre from harpsichord to organ fits unexpectedly well with Variatio IV.

At the conclusion of Variatio IV, above the fourth line of the cantus firmus, the right hand weaves an elaborate coloratura line. In the middle parts the slower dragging Bach motif comes to a climax: the alto voice plays the motif B-A-C-H in the last quavers of bar 39, and then, in the four semiquavers with an upbeat on bars 40–41, the backwards (or retrograde) motif H-C-A-B. Bach further enhances the musical material by closing the final bars with the Comes canon of Variatio IV, essentially the same initial bars as the starting Dux canon of Variatio I. At the peaceful coda, elegiac piping motifs are repeated over a pedal point. As Williams (2003) describes, the closing passages of Variatio IV reflect Bach's "immense motivic ingenuity", which in bar 39 contains "one of the best bars in the whole of P 271".

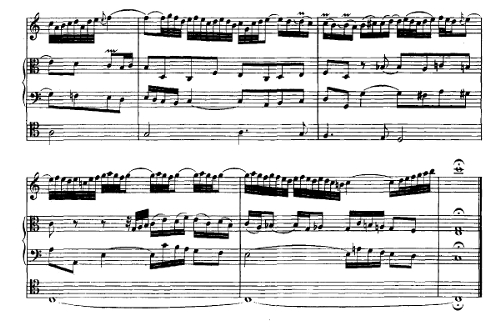

=== Variatio V ===
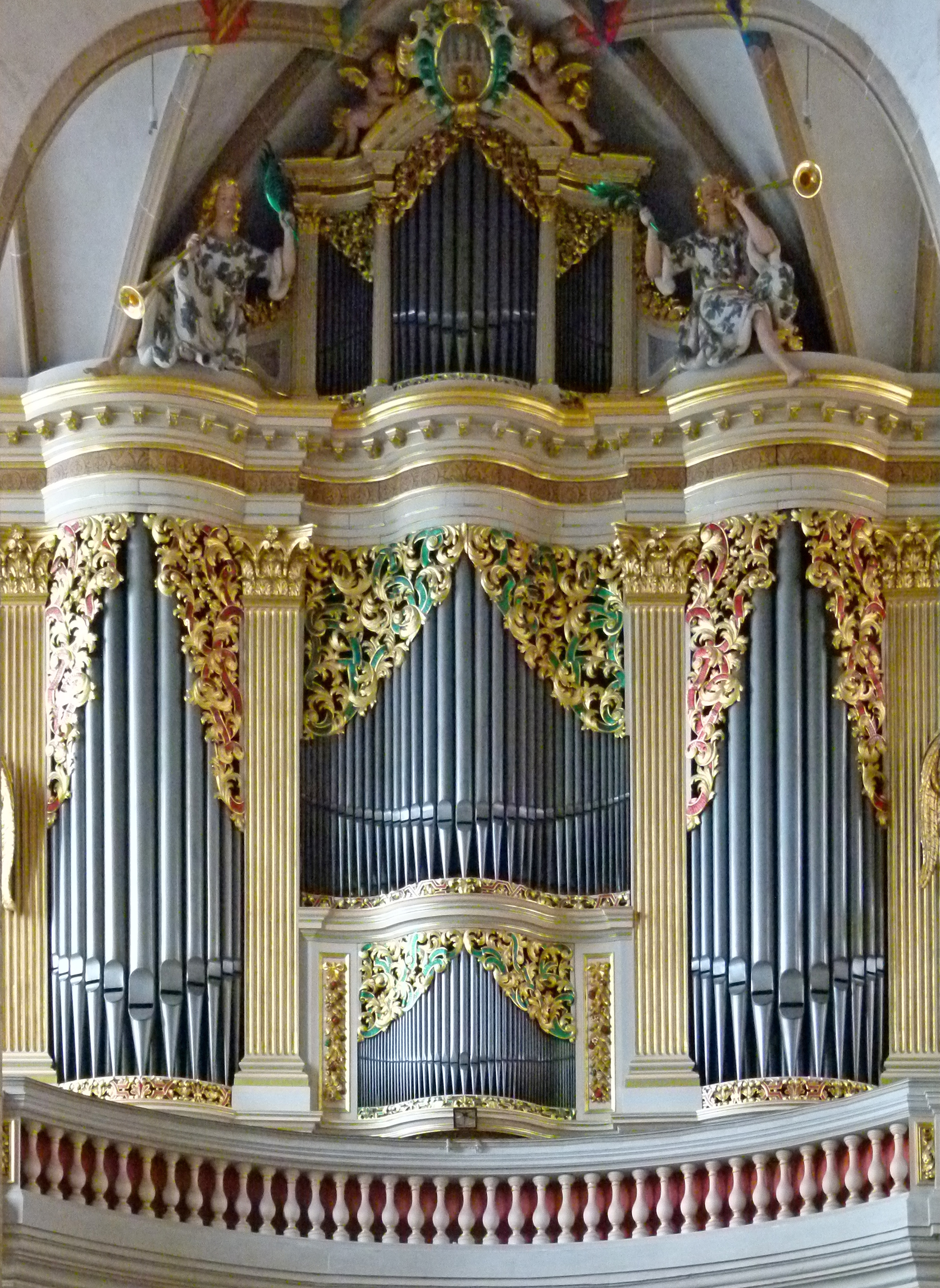
Silbermann Organ, 1714, Freiberg Cathedral

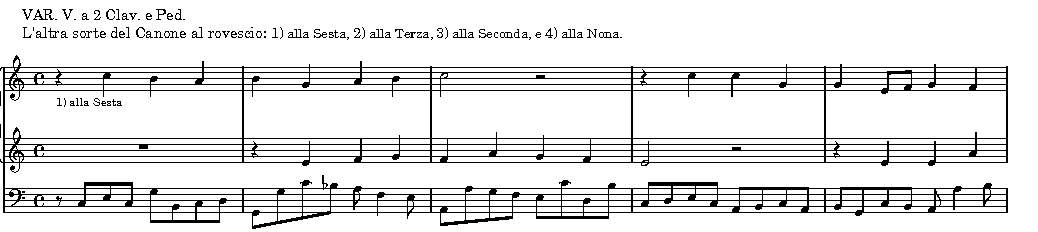

In this variation, the canon is the melody of the chorale itself. It has three sections, the first and second further subdivided in two, building up to a majestic and complex climax in the final bars of the third section. In the first section, the two manual parts play the chorale line by line in inverted canon over a walking bass continuo stamped out in the pedal, first at an interval of sixth and then a third. In the second and third sections, the pedal part returns to the smooth lines of the cantus firmus.

To an untrained ear, the voice-leading in the canon of Variatio IV is hardly noticeable and is imperceptible after 3 bars; the musical structure of the canons in Variatio V, however, is much clearer than any of the other variations. The mirror-inversion between the canonical voices in the sixth is immediately heard, mostly in plain crotchets of the cantus firmus; that is equally true for the conventional canonic parts and their inversions, in the third, second and ninth. In the third and ninth canons, the chorale melody is initially played reflected: the pleasure and anticipation of the listener is enhanced by hearing the true melody afterwards. In the autograph manuscript version, BWV 769a, the sequence of Variatio II and then Variatio V makes it much easier to follow the canonic parts. The striding quaver figures in the pedal part, however, are unusual and are a response to Bach's development from a baroque to a more modern style.

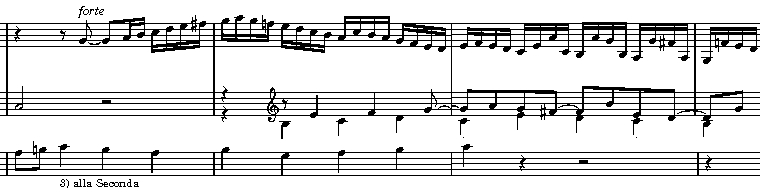

In the second section, the pedal and the separate hands again play the chorale line by line in inverted canon, separated by an interval of a second and then a ninth, with a free imitative part in the hand playing the canon and a free running semiquaver part in the other hand. The semiquavers occur first in the right hand with the imitative part above the left hand; then in the left hand with the imitative part below the canon. With the quaver canonic voices now accompanied by continuously flowing semiquavers, the feeling of endless movement in Variatio III and IV is now experienced in Variatio V, a new form of moto perpetuo. The musical texture is similar to that used previously in Vom Himmel kam der Engel Schar, BWV 607, from the Orgelbüchlein, another chorale prelude for advent on the theme of descending angels.

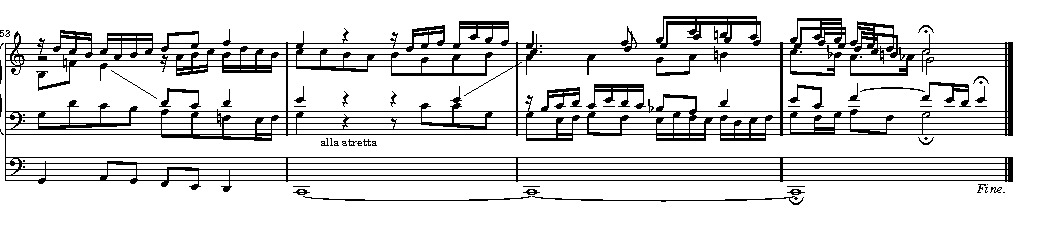

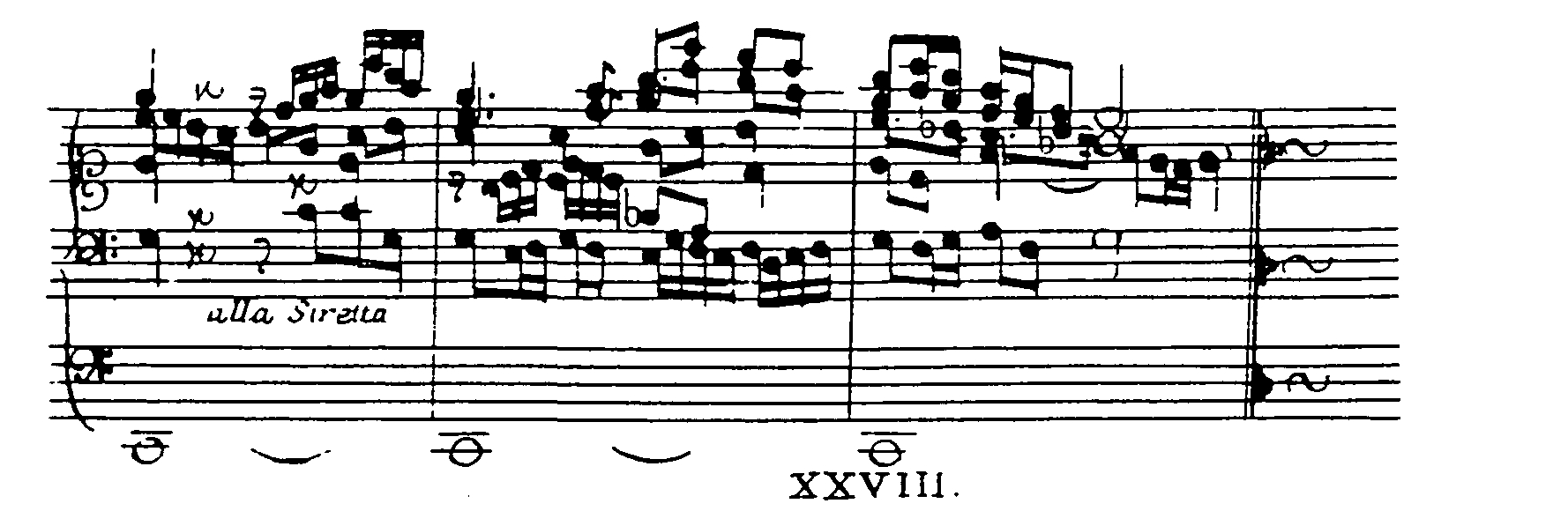
Conclusion of fifth variation of BWV 769; in the original engraving the BACH motif did not occur in the inner parts in the last bar

In the last section, marked forte, the pedal part plays the last line of the cantus firmus, with the first line in true and inverted forms in diminutio above it. The variation culminates over the closing pedal point with a stretto of all four lines, again with inversions and diminutio. At this point the manual parts, move to one keyboard: in the expansive pro organo pleno, there are now five voices, joined right at the end by a new sixth voice that heralds a restatement of the melodic theme. The supposed occurrence of the BACH motif shared between the two inner manual parts in the last bar did not occur in the original printing of BWV 769, where there is B flat (B in German) instead of a B natural (H in German); this was modified by editors in later editions.

The compositional technique in Variatio V can be compared with the five-part organ work Nun komm der Heiden Heiland of Georg Friedrich Kauffmann and with Bach's earlier partita, O Gott, der fromme Gott, BWV 767. Referring to Scheibe's "sublime fire", Yearsley (2002) describes the overwhelming climax in the final stretto passage of Variatio V: "This contrapuntal density generates an expansion of the texture and with the accompanying dynamic boost bursts the shackles of counterpoint, erupting into expressive brilliance and grandeur—the ultimate rhetorical summation".

== Organ registration ==
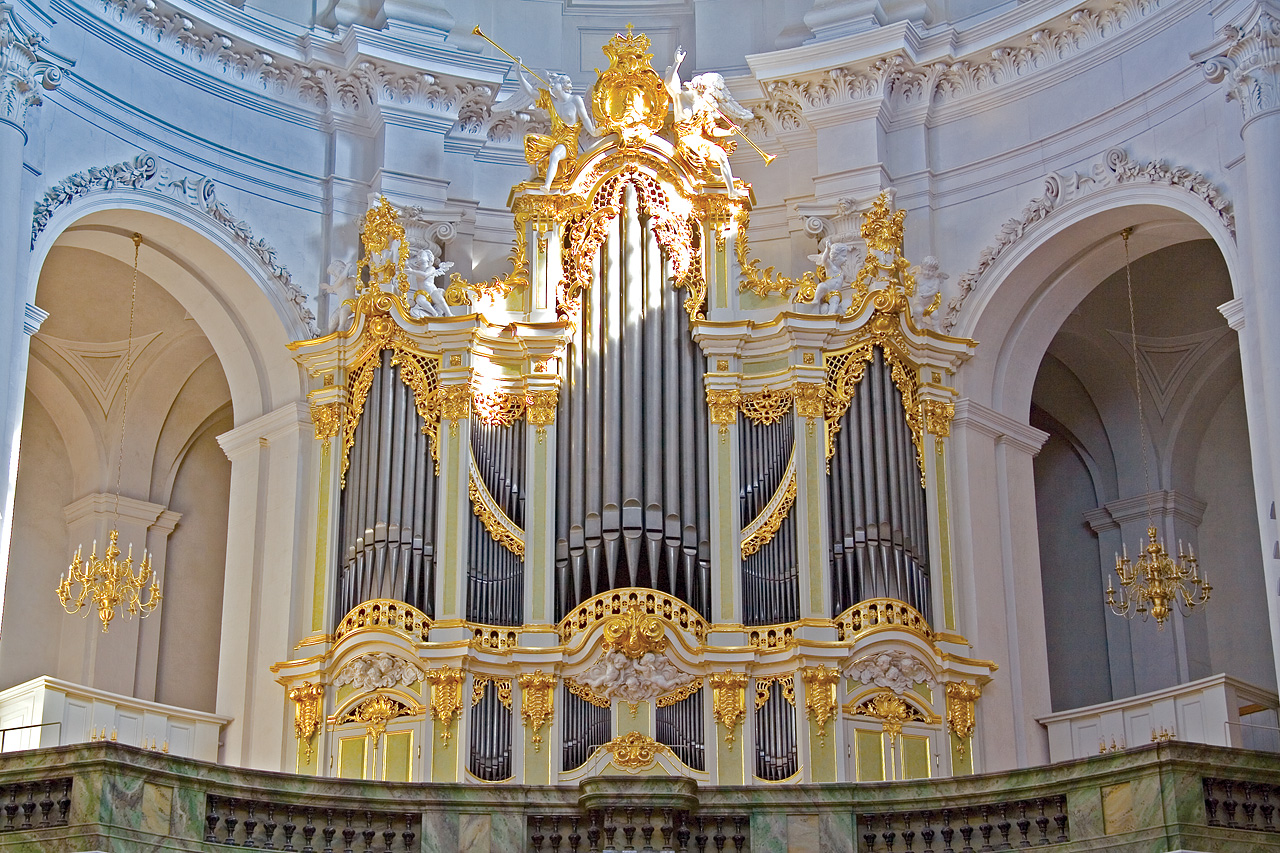
Silbermann Organ, Hofkirche, Dresden

The first three variations concern the voice pitch of the cantus firmus. In Variatio I it is in the lower voice: according to Haas (2008), with the registration on a 16' stop, the cantus firmus would correspond to a bass part, with many crossings in the left hand of the manual. Likewise Variatio II is for a bass part and Variatio III for a soprano. These earlier variations are significant for understanding the performance and balance of the augmentation canon.

In the augmentation canon, the upper soprano voice plays at twice the pace, with the lower voice slower. It makes sense to place the faster canonic voice in the upper manual and the longer canonic one in the lower manual, with the free alto voice also in the lower manual. A few notes of the right hand side can be shared between upper and lower manuals; Williams (2003) has even indicated that theoretically the three voices—the two canonic voices and the free alto voice—could be performed on three different manuals. According to the previous observation on the positioning of the chorale melody, the most appropriate place for the cantus firmus is in the middle register, i.e. in the tenor or the alto. For the specific choice of registration in the pedal (tenor or alto, 8' or 4'), Bernhard Haas has again given detailed advice on the options available.

The registration of the five-part Variatio V is more complicated: it initially involves two manuals and pedal; at the concluding pedal point there are six parts played in organo pleno on a single manual with pedal, possibly with octaves transposed in some doubled parts.

== Reception ==
The Canonic Variations were among the works included in J. G. Schicht's four-volume anthology of Bach's organ music (1803–1806), prior to the publication of Bach's complete organ works in 1847 by Griepenkerl and Roitzsch in Leipzig. Felix Mendelssohn, Robert Schumann and Johannes Brahms all studied the Variations, annotating their personal copies of Schicht. Mendelssohn himself composed a six-movement cantata on "Vom Himmel hoch" in 1831 for soprano, baritone, mixed choir and orchestra, opening with the same descending figures as those in Bach's Variation 1.

== Transcriptions ==
- Ivan Karlovitsch Tscherlitzky (1799–1865), organist in the Maltese Chapel adjoining the Vorontsov Palace in St Petersburg, arranged the Canonic Variations for piano solo.
- In 1951 and 1958 the Swiss organist, conductor and composer Roger Vuataz (1898–1988) made two arrangements of the Canonic Variations for orchestra.
- In 1956 Igor Stravinsky made an arrangement of the Canonic Variations for orchestra and mixed choir, adding extra contrapuntal lines.

== Selected recordings ==
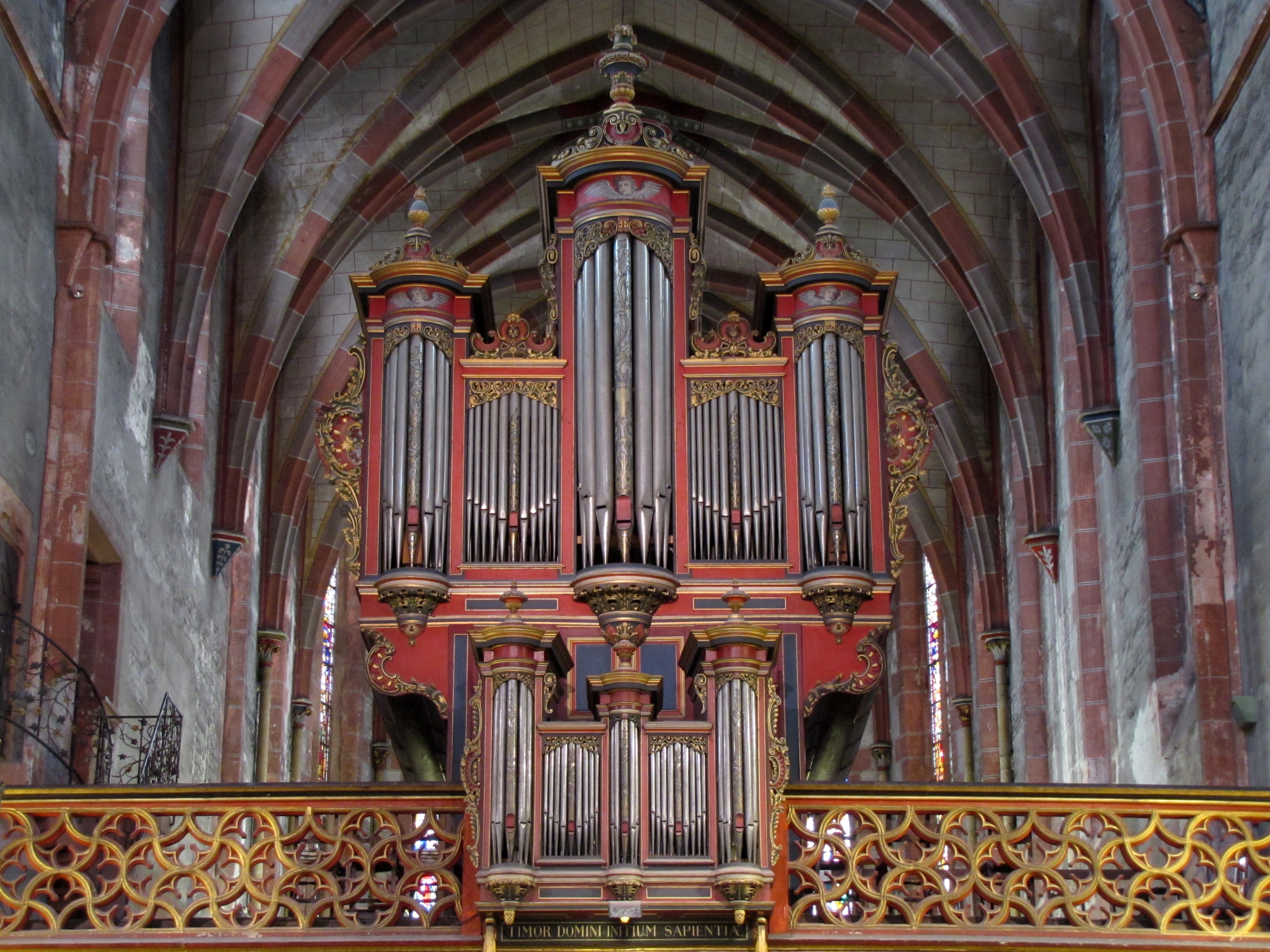
Silbermann Organ, 1780, St-Pierre-le-Jeune, Strasbourg

- Helmut Walcha, Bach Great Organ Works, Deutsche Grammophon, 2-disc set remastered from recordings between 1947 and 1950, played on the Silbermann Organ, Saint-Pierre-le-Jeune, Strasbourg.
- Anton Heiller, Heiller at Harvard, Moran-Fisk-Kent, contained on the first disc of a 4-CD box mastered from live recitals recorded between 1967 and 1973 on the first Fisk organ at Memorial Church.
- Marie-Claire Alain, Bach Collected Works for Organ, Erato, 1986.
- André Isoir, L'Oeuvre pour Orgue (15 discs), Calliope, CAL 3703–3717 (budget edition 2008). The Canonic Variations and the Great Eighteen Chorale Preludes, recorded in 1990 on the G. Westenfelder organ in Fère-en-Tardenois, are contained on the last 2 discs, which are available separately.
- Christopher Herrick, Partitas and Canonic Variations, Hyperion, 1991.
- Bernard Foccroulle, Leipzig Chorales, Ricercar, RIC212 (2 discs). Recorded in 2002 on the large Silbermann organ in Freiberg Cathedral, Germany, dating from 1714. The recording also includes the Preludes and Fugues BWV 546 and 547 and the Great Eighteen Chorale Preludes.
- Robert Quinney, recorded in the 1975 Metzler Organ in Trinity College, Cambridge, J.S. Bach, Organ Works Vol.III, BWV 769a, CORO, 2015.
