= Santiago Lanchares =

Spanish composer (born 1952)

- Born: 1952 (age 73–74); Piña de Campos, Palencia, Spain
- Occupation: Composer

Santiago Lanchares (born 1952, on Piña de Campos, Palencia, Spain) is a Spanish composer. He studied music at the Madrid Royal Conservatory with Carmelo Bernaola, F. Calés, and Luis de Pablo. Later he attended Composition Courses and Seminars given among others by Olivier Messiaen, Cristóbal Halffter, Helmut Lachenmann, etc.

== Background ==
He has received commissions from C.D.M.C, I.N.A.E.M., C.O.M. 92, Hungarian Radio, National Radio of Spain, Donostiarra Musical Fortnight, Guerrero Project, Alicante Festival as well as various soloists, groups, and private institutions. His music has been performed in different European Cycles and Festivals, Amsterdam, Budapest, Bucharest, Lisbon, London, Buenos Aires, Australia, New Zealand, and Indonesia. He has been invited to participate with a composition in the Concerts in homage to Béla Bartók on the occasion of his centenary, organized by the Hungarian Radio. His work Remembering Ma Yuan has represented Spain in the Tribune of Unesco of 1992 in the category of Electroacoustic music. He has been a professor at the Didactic Concerts Seminar at the XXVIII Manuel de Falla International Course in Granada. In October 2002, the XVIII Alicante Festival paid tribute to his 50th anniversary at the closing concert of the Festival. In the same year, his virtuosic piano work "Anandamanía" dedicated to the Indonesian virtuoso pianist, Ananda Sukarlan, has been selected for the Unesco International Tribune, held in Vienna, and the International Piano Competition Xavier Montsalvatge has chosen his other piano work "Two Dances and an Interlude" as one of the obligatory works of its second round. Ananda Sukarlan has performed "Anandamania" hundreds of times worldwide since then, as well as recorded his complete piano works.

== Music activities ==
From 1981 to 1995 he has been a collaborator of Radio 2 Clásica, where he worked as director and scriptwriter of numerous programs: Nature and Music, The Hour of Dances, Chamber Music, Domestic Concert, etc. There he developed activities as a musical commentator and recording critic. Likewise he was engaged in music recording tasks. He has also been a producer of the CD with Orchestral works by Rodolfo Halffter recorded by the Madrid Community Orchestra with Jose Ramon Encinar. Indonesian pianist Ananda Sukarlan has recorded a CD with his complete piano works published in 2005, while the Gran Canaria Philharmonic Orchestra conducted by Adrian Leaper, with Fernando Palacios as narrator recorded a CD of his orchestral work Enter, gentlemen, Enter! for the collection of recordings of didactic works of this orchestra. It was Ananda Sukarlan who inspired most of his piano works since the year 2000, and Lanchares has since then been considered as one of Spain's most important composers for the piano.

His latest work is a ballet for piano and percussion, Castor & Pollux, written for pianist Ananda Sukarlan and percussionist Miquel Bernat. This ballet lasts for a bit more than 1 hour and can be performed as a duo in a concert without choreography.

== Works ==
Year	Title	Note
2004	Anandamania, for piano	Keyboard
	Castor y Pollux, for piano & percussion	Keyboard
	Cinco Amigos, for piano	Keyboard
	Contra la Corriente, for piano	Keyboard
2009	Cuaderno de estilos, for piano & percussion	Chamber Music
	Dodecaedro Irregular, for piano	Keyboard
	Dos Danzas y un Interludio, for piano	Keyboard
	Dos Invenciones, for piano	Keyboard
	Dos Piezas para Alicia, for piano	Keyboard
	En el Sendero, for piano	Keyboard
	Piano Sonata	Keyboard
	Renacimiento de Castor, for piano	Keyboard

== Credit ==
Year	Album	Artists	Note
2011	Benet Casablancas:Siete escenas de Hamlet; Tres Haikus; Alter Klang; Retablo sobre texts de Paul Klee	José Ramón Encinar / Orquesta del la Comunidad de Madrid	Editing
2011	Massimo Botter: Scream	José Ramón Encinar / Orquesta del la Comunidad de Madrid	Assistant Engineer
2008	Gabriel Erkoreka: Afrika; kantak; Jukal; Akorda	José Ramón Encinar	Producer
2004	Rodolfo Halffter: Don Lindo de Almería; Ballet Suites	José Ramón Encinar	Producer
2003	Francisco Guerrero: Complete Orchestral Works	José Ramón Encinar / Orquesta Sinfónica de Galicia	Producer
2003	Santiago Lanchares: Castor y Pollux	Miguel Bernat / Ananda Sukarlan	Composer

== See also ==
- Ananda Sukarlan
