= Weimar concerto transcriptions (Bach) =

Concerto transcriptions of Bach, written 1708–1717

The concerto transcriptions of Johann Sebastian Bach date from his second period at the court in Weimar (1708–1717). Bach transcribed for organ and harpsichord a number of Italian and Italianate concertos, mainly by Antonio Vivaldi, but with others by Alessandro Marcello, Benedetto Marcello, Georg Philipp Telemann and the musically talented Prince Johann Ernst of Saxe-Weimar. It is thought that most of the transcriptions were probably made in 1713–1714. Their publication by C.F. Peters in the 1850s and by Breitkopf & Härtel in the 1890s played a decisive role in the Vivaldi revival of the twentieth century.

Johann Sebastian Bach was a court musician in Weimar from 1708 to 1717. He wrote most, if not all, of his concerto transcriptions for organ (BWV 592–596) and for harpsichord (BWV 592a and 972–987) from July 1713 to July 1714. Most of these transcriptions were based on concertos by Antonio Vivaldi. Other models for the transcriptions included concertos by Alessandro Marcello, Benedetto Marcello, Georg Philipp Telemann and Prince Johann Ernst of Saxe-Weimar.

Around 1715 Johann Bernhard Bach, Johann Sebastian's second cousin, copied 12 of the concerto transcriptions in a single manuscript. This manuscript, shelf mark P 280 in the Berlin State Library, starts with the harpsichord transcriptions BWV 972–981, followed by the organ transcription BWV 592, and ends with BWV 982. The sequence of the concertos in this manuscript is possibly as intended by the composer. For the organ transcriptions there is no known sequence that may go back to Bach's time.

== History, purpose, transmission and significance ==
The pleasure His Grace took in his playing fired him with the desire to try every possible artistry in his treatment of the organ.

— Nekrolog, Carl Philipp Emanuel Bach and Johann Friedrich Agricola

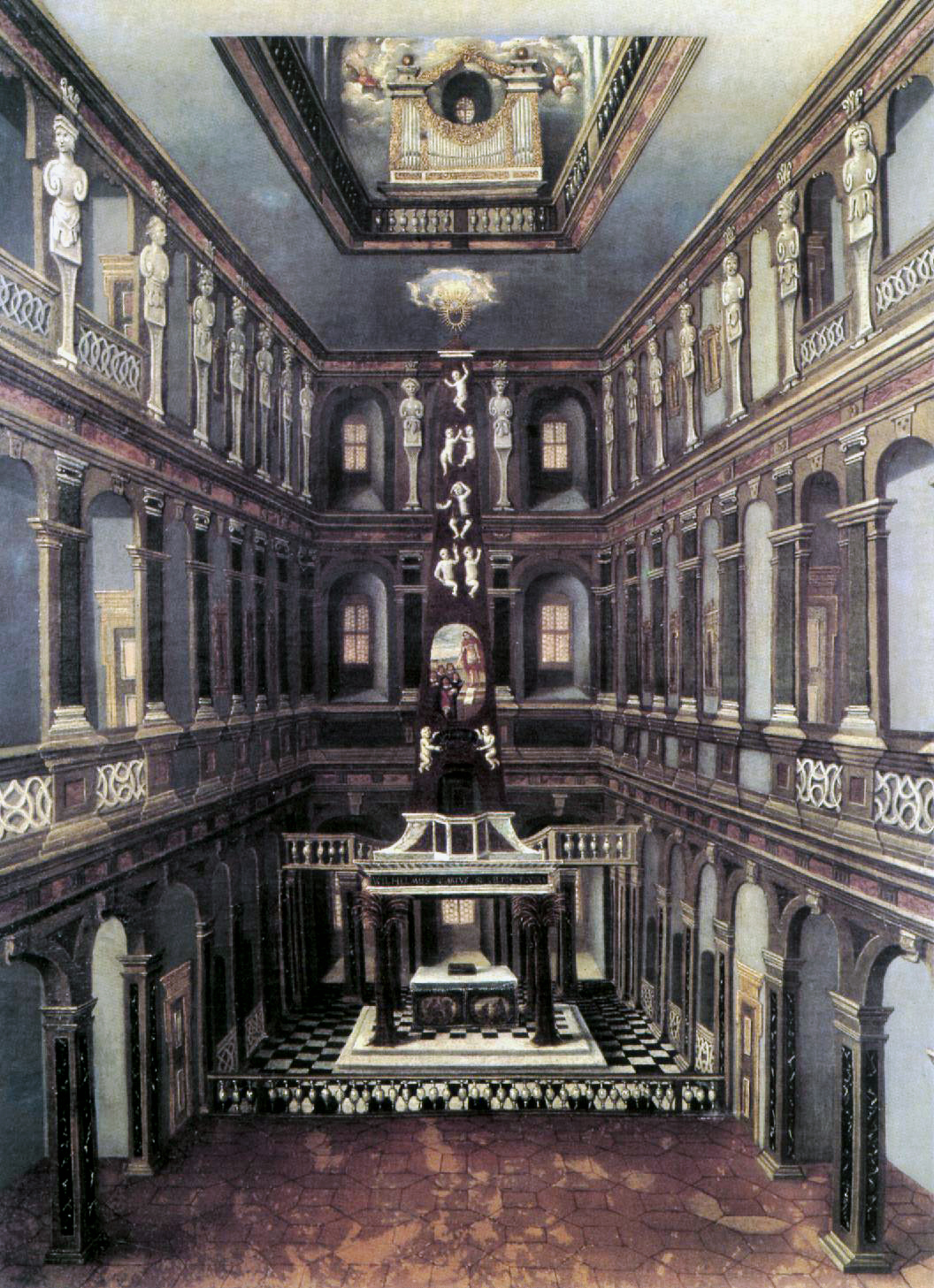
The court chapel or Himmelsburg at the Schloss in Weimar. The organ, at the top of the picture, was overhauled by J. K. Weisshaupt in 1707–1708, shortly before Bach's arrival, with further improvements by H. N. Trebs in June 1712–May 1714.

Bach's concerto transcriptions reflect not only his general interest in and assimilation of musical forms originating in Italy, in particular the concertos of his Venetian contemporary Antonio Vivaldi, but also the particular circumstances of his second period of employment 1708–1717 at the court in Weimar.

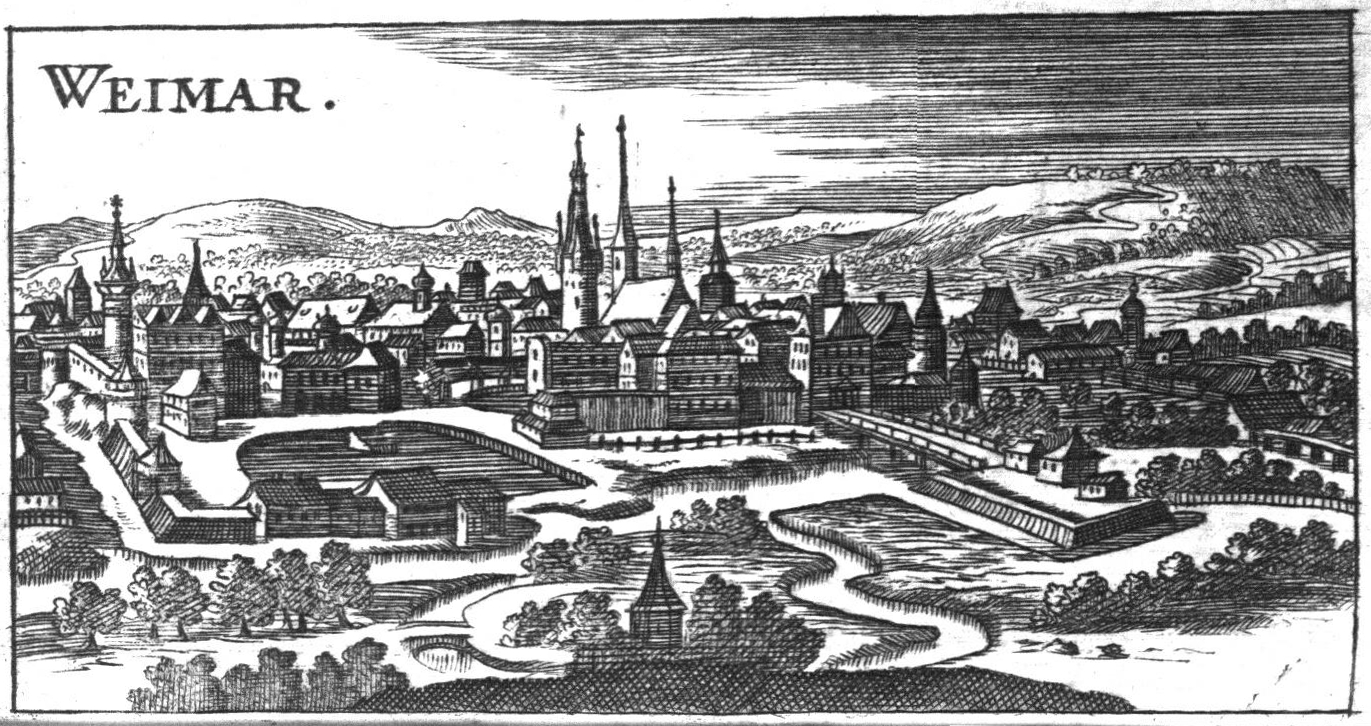
View of Weimar, 1686: the Wilhelmsburg is in the centre, with the Stadtkirche behind. The 3-storey Rotes Schloss is over the footbridge on the far left.

During his first brief period in Weimar in 1703 Bach was employed as a court violinist for seven months by Johann Ernst III, Duke of Saxe-Weimar, who ruled jointly with his elder brother Wilhelm Ernst, Duke of Saxe-Weimar. Wilhelm Ernst's Lutheran piety contrasted with his younger brother's alcoholism. On Johann Ernst's death in 1707, he was succeeded as coregent by his elder son Ernst August, who lived with his younger stepbrother, Prince Johann Ernst, outside the ducal Wilhelmsburg in the Rotes Schloss. A talented amateur musician, from an early age Prince Johann Ernst had been taught the violin by the court violinist Gregor Christoph Eilenstein. Johann Ernst studied the keyboard with Bach's distant cousin Johann Gottfried Walther, after he became organist at the Stadtkirche in Weimar in 1707. The following year, when Bach himself was appointed as organist in Weimar in the ducal chapel or Himmelsburg, he not only had at his disposal the recently renovated chapel organ but also the organ in the Stadtkirche. In the Wilhelmsburg, Wilhelm Ernst had already revived the court orchestra, of which Bach eventually became Concertmaster in 1714. As well as music-making in the Wilhelmsburg, Bach was almost certainly involved in the parallel more secular musical events in the Rotes Schloss organised by August Ernst and Johann Ernst. Harpsichords were available to Bach at both venues.

Jones (2007) traces the influences on Bach's early keyboard compositions—in particular his sonatas (BWV 963/1, BWV 967) and toccatas (BWV 912a/2, BWV 915/2)—not only to the works of his older compatriots Kuhnau, Böhm and Buxtehude, but also to the works of Italian composers from the end of the seventeenth century; in particular the chamber sonatas of Corelli and the concertos of Torelli and Albinoni.

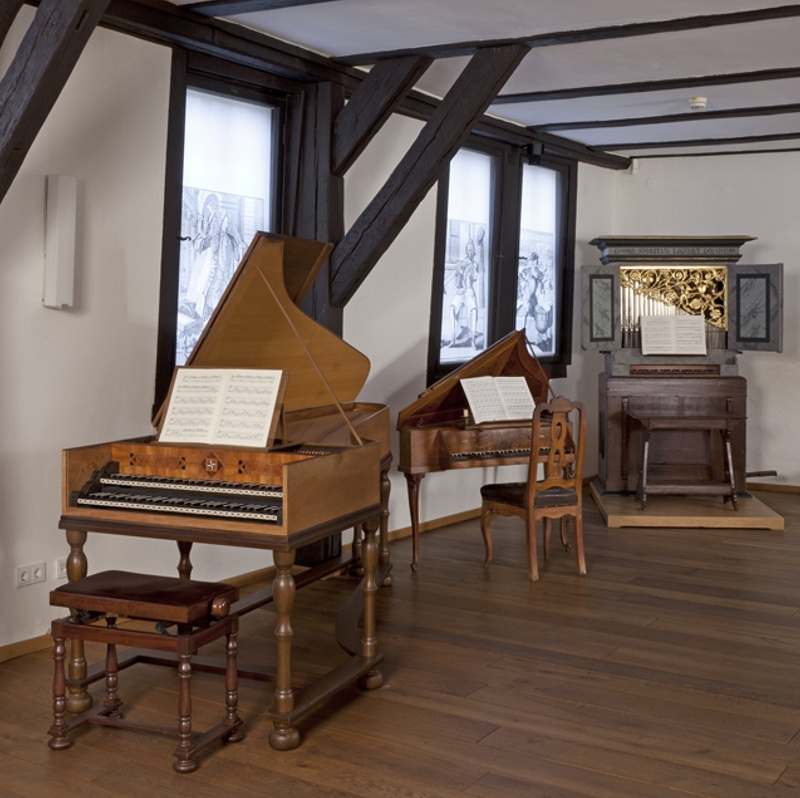
Instruments in the Bachhaus Eisenach. In the foreground is a copy of a 1705 harpsichord of the type Bach would have played in Weimar. In the background is a 1650 chamber organ from Kleinschwabhausen near Weimar.

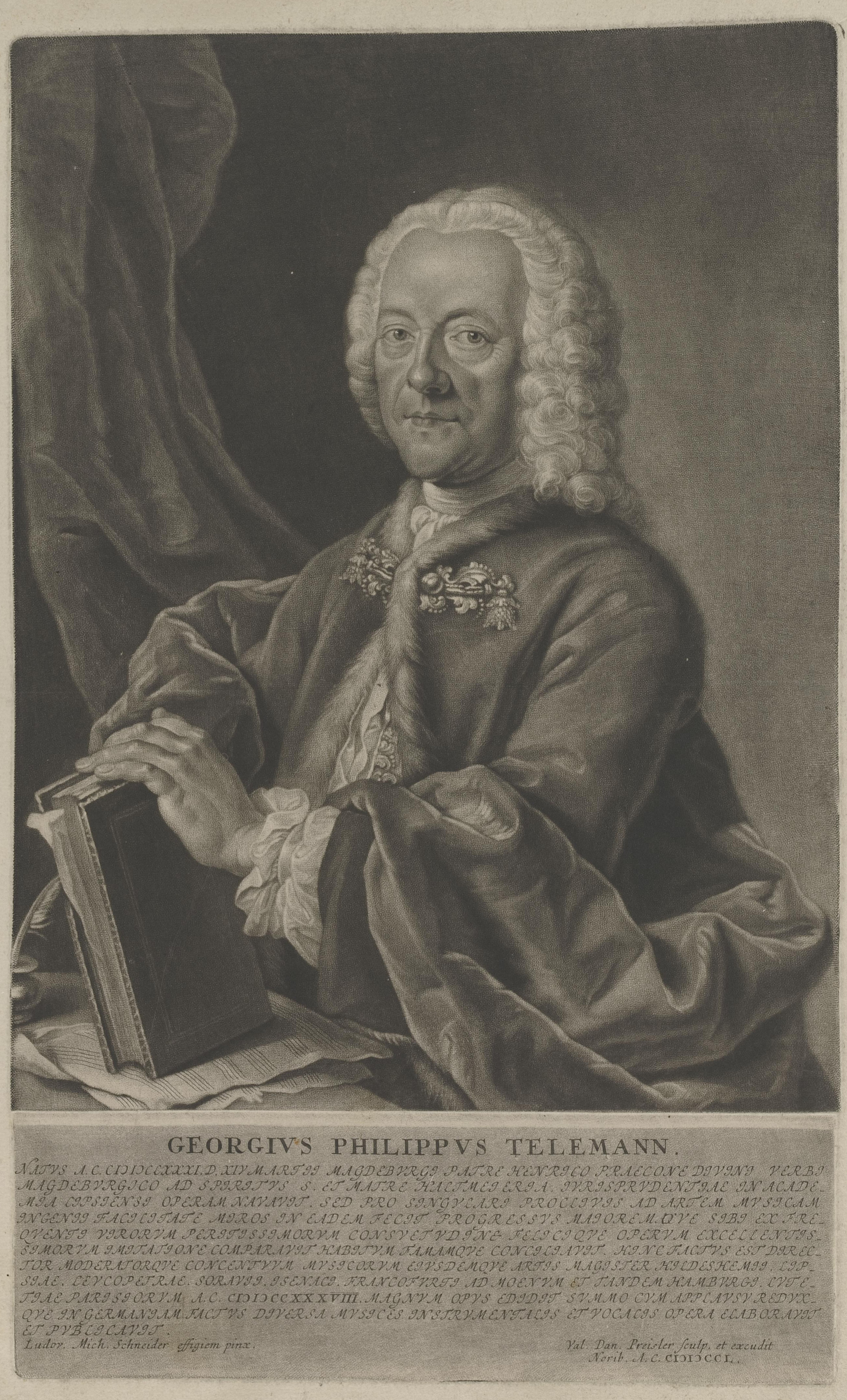
Georg Philipp Telemann, engraving by Valentin Daniel Preisler

Early works like BWV 912a and BWV 967, probably composed before 1707, also display concerto-like elements. The first documented evidence of Bach's engagement with the concerto genre can be dated to around 1709, during his second period in Weimar, when he made a hand copy of the continuo part of Albinoni's Sinfonie e concerti a 5, Op. 2 (1700). Earlier compositions had been brought back to Weimar from Italy by the deputy Capellmeister, Johann Wilhelm Drese, during his stay there in 1702–1703. In 1709 the virtuoso violinist Johann Georg Pisendel visited Weimar: he had studied with Torelli and is likely to have acquainted Bach with more of the Italian concerto repertoire. In the same year Bach also copied out all the parts of the double violin concerto in G major, TWV 52:G2, of Georg Philipp Telemann, a work that he might have acquired through Pisendel. Bach would also have known Telemann well then since he was court musician at Eisenach, Bach's birthplace. Telemann's concerto for solo violin, TWV 51:g1, transcribed by Bach for harpsichord as BWV 985, comes from the same series of Eisenach concertos as the double violin concerto; moreover, as explained in Zohn (2008), there is evidence that the slow movement of Telemann's oboe concerto TWV 51:G2, also from the series, was borrowed and adapted by Bach for the opening sinfonia of the cantata Ich steh mit einem Fuß im Grabe, BWV 156 and the slow movement of the harpsichord concerto in F minor, BWV 1056, both dating from his period in Leipzig. Telemann also had a documented social connection with Bach: in March 1714 he was godparent at the baptism in Weimar of Bach's second son Carl Philipp Emanuel.

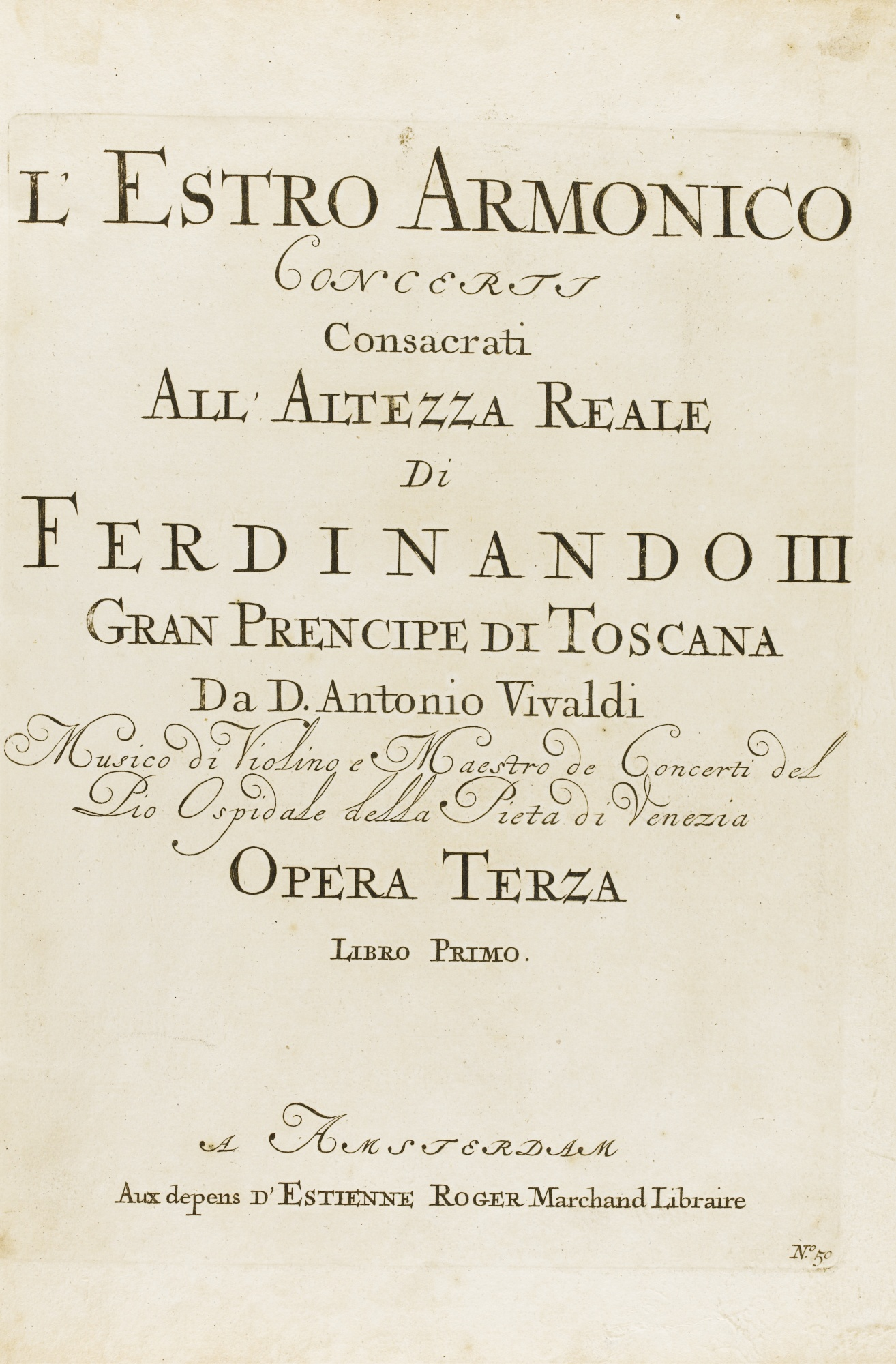
Title page of L'estro armonico, the collection of 12 concertos of Vivaldi's Op. 3, published in Amsterdam by Estienne Roger

Later in July 1713, Prince Johann Ernst returned from Utrecht after studying there for 2 years. A keen amateur violinist, he is likely to have brought or sent back concerto scores from Amsterdam, probably including the collection L'estro armonico, Op. 3 of Vivaldi, published there in 1711. Once back in Weimar, he studied composition with Walther, concentrating on the violin concerto. In July 1714, however, poor health forced him to leave Weimar to seek medical treatment in Bad Schwalbach: he died a year later at the age of nineteen. A number of his concertos were published posthumously by Telemann.

Johann Ernst's enthusiasm for the concerto fitted well with Bach's own interests. It was under these circumstances that Bach, as composer and performer, made his virtuosic concerto transcriptions for organ (BWV 592–596) and for harpsichord (BWV 972–987 and BWV 592a). Although Bach served as Concertmaster in Weimar from 1714–1717, when he is presumed to have composed his own instrumental concertos, the only surviving works in Italian concerto-form from this period are his transcriptions of works by other composers. Of these, the main body were by Vivaldi, with others by Telemann, Alessandro and Benedetto Marcello and Johann Ernst himself. At the same time, Bach's cousin Walther also made a series of organ transcriptions of Italian concertos: in his autobiography, Walther mentions 78 such transcriptions; but of these only 14 survive, of concertos by Albinoni, Giorgio Gentili, Giulio Taglietti, Telemann, Torelli and Vivaldi. Bach and Walther arranged different sets of concertos: Bach favoured the more recent ritornello form, less prevalent in the earlier concertos transcribed by Walther.

Schulze (1978) has given the following explanation for the transcriptions:

Bach’s organ and harpsichord transcriptions BWV 592–596 and 972–987 belong to the year July 1713 to July 1714, were made at the request of Prince Johann Ernst von Sachsen-Weimar, and imply a definite connection with the concert repertory played in Weimar and enlarged by the Prince’s recent purchases of music. Since the court concerts gave Bach an opportunity to know the works in their original form, the transcriptions are not so much study-works as practical versions and virtuoso 'commissioned' music.

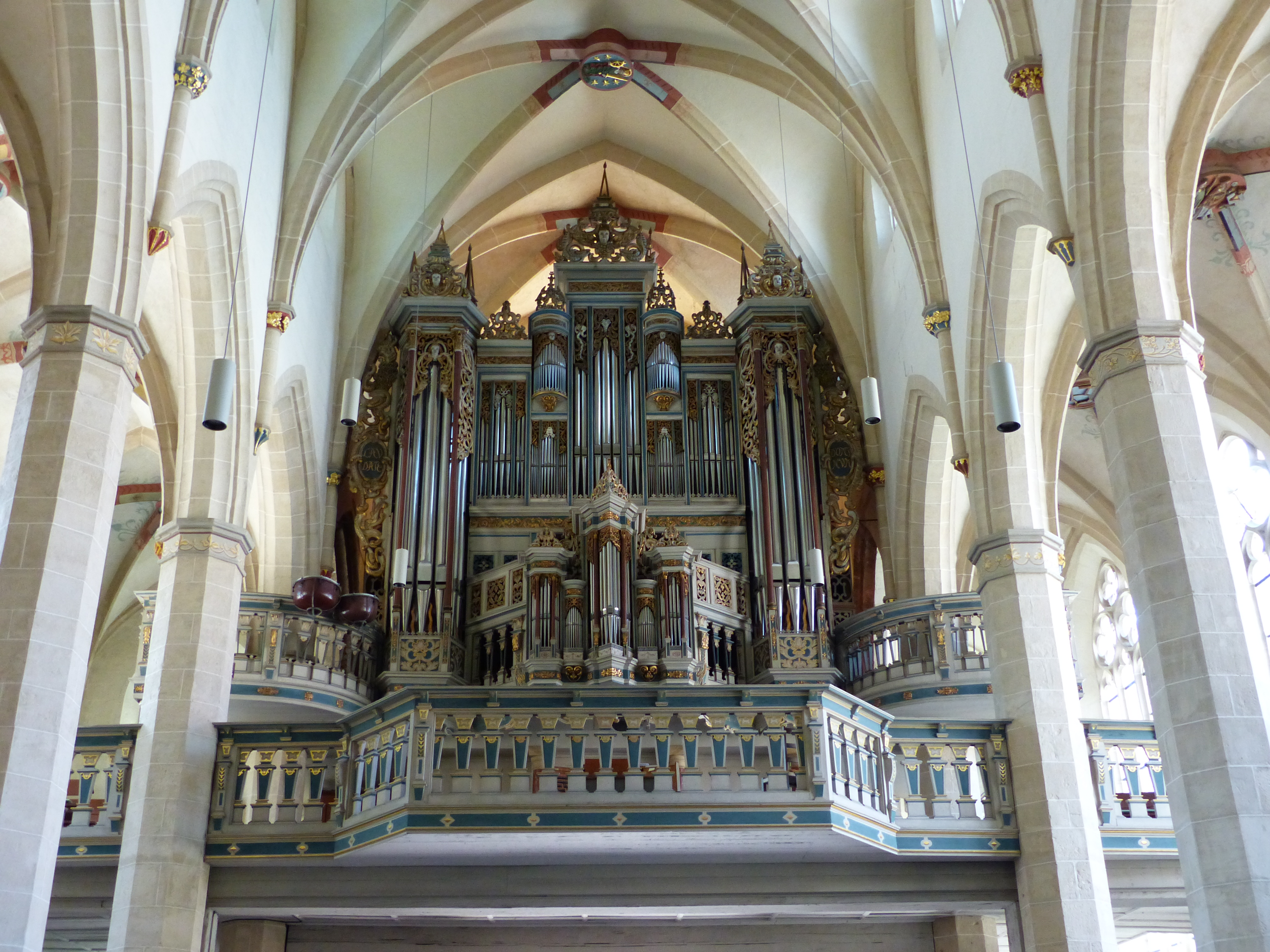
Organ in the Predigerkirche in Erfurt. The facade is that of the original baroque organ built in 1650 by Ludwig Compenius, who also built the organ in the Himmelsburg in Weimar

Schulze has further suggested that during his two year period studying in the Netherlands, Prince Johann Ernst is likely to have attended the popular concerts in the Nieuwe Kerk in Amsterdam where the blind organist Jan Jakob de Graaf performed his own transcriptions of the most recent Italian concertos. It is possible that this could have led to Johann Ernst to suggest similar concerto transcriptions to Bach and Walther. Other circumstantial evidence concerning music-making in Weimar is provided by a letter written by Bach's pupil Philipp David Kräuter in April 1713. Asking for permission to stay longer in Weimar, he states that Prince Johann Ernst,

who himself plays the violin incomparably, will return to Weimar from Holland after Easter and spend the summer here; I could then hear much fine Italian and French music, which would be particularly profitable to me in composing concertos and ouvertures ... I know too that when the new organ in Weimar is ready, Herr Bach will play incomparable things on it, especially at first ...

Kräuter's letter ties in with the organ repairs by Trebs made between June 1713 and May 1714. Commentators have found Schulze's arguments persuasive, but nevertheless point out that not all the transcriptions need have been made in the period from July 1713 to July 1714 when the Prince was back in Weimar. While this could be true for the simpler harpsichord transcriptions, some of the more virtuosic organ transcriptions could date from later, possible composed as a memorial to the prince, after his untimely death.

Published records of Bach's life include his Nekrolog or obituary, written in 1754 by his son Carl Philipp Emanuel Bach and former pupil Johann Friedrich Agricola, and the 1802 biography of Johann Nikolaus Forkel. The Nekrolog contains the famous statement about the Duke, Wilhelm Ernst, encouraging Bach as an organist-composer, quoted at the start of this section. In the often quoted passage from his biography, Forkel wrote:

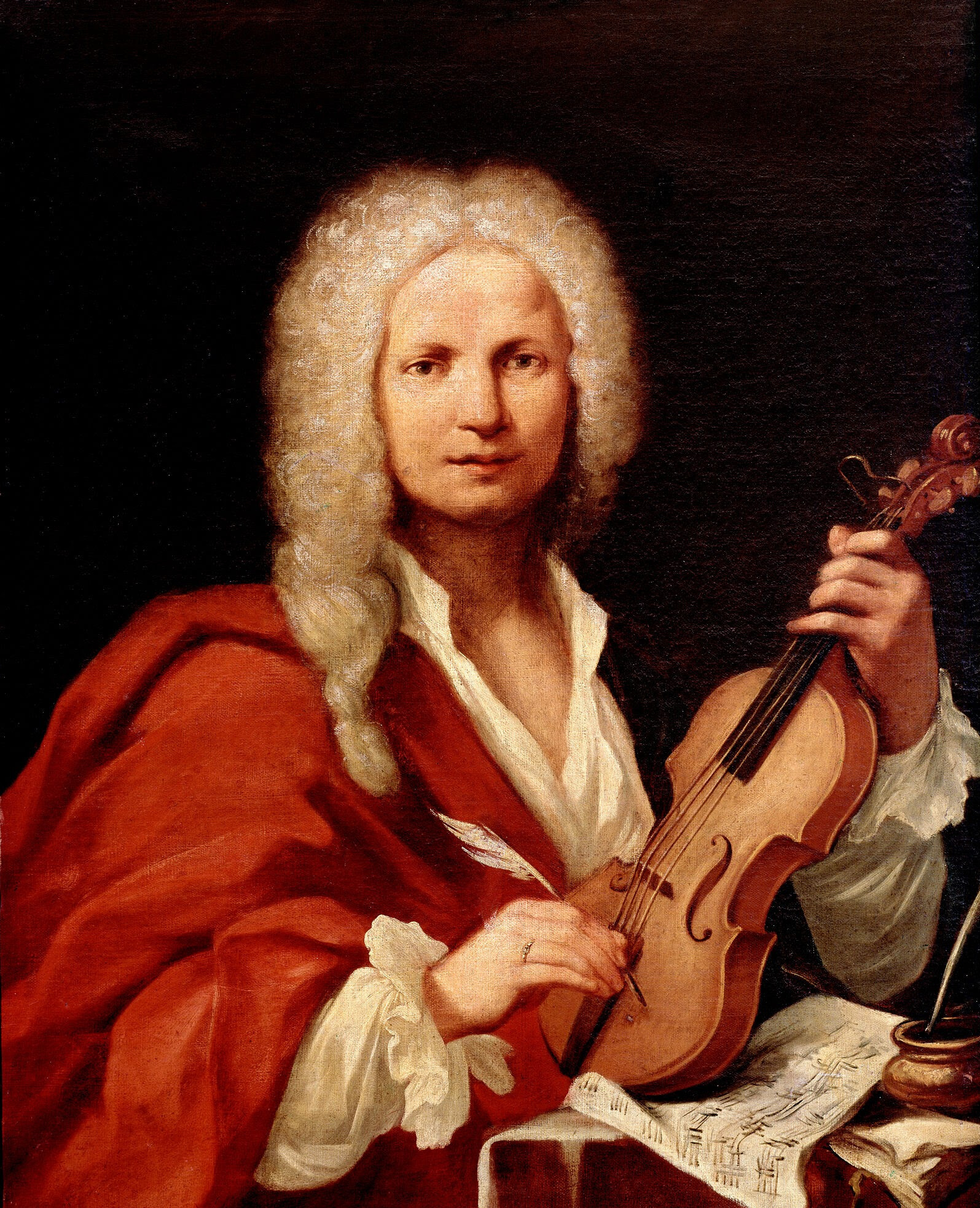
Probable portrait of Antonio Vivaldi, 1723

J.S. Bach’s first attempts at composition, like all such efforts, were unsatisfactory. Lacking any instruction to point him towards his goal, he had to do what he could in his own way, like others who set out without a guide. Most beginning composers let their fingers run riot up and down the keyboard, snatching handfuls of notes, assaulting the instrument in an undisciplined way ... Such composers can only be "finger composers" (or "keyboard cavaliers" as Bach called them later on in his life): that is, they let their fingers tell them what to write instead of instructing their fingers what to play. Bach abandoned that method of composition when he observed that brilliant flourishes lead nowhere. He realised that musical ideas need to be subordinated to a plan and that a young composer's first need is a model to guide his efforts. Vivaldi's violin concertos, which had just been published, gave him the guidance he needed. He had often heard them praised for their artistic excellence and decided upon the happy idea of arranging them all for the clavier. He was thus led to study their structure, the musical ideas on which they are built, the pattern of their modulations, and many other characteristics. Moreover, in adapting ideas and figurations originally conceived for the violin to the keyboard, Bach was compelled to think in musical terms, so that his ideas no longer depended on his fingers, but were drawn from his imagination.

Although Forkel's account is generally acknowledged to be oversimplified and factually inaccurate, commentators agree that Bach's knowledge and assimilation of the Italian concerto form—which happened partly through his transcriptions—played a key role in the development of his mature style. In practical terms, the concerto transcriptions were suitable for performance in the different venues in Weimar; they would have served an educational purpose for the young prince as well as giving him pleasure.

Marshall (1986) has carried out a systematic study of headings and markings in surviving manuscripts to ascertain the intended instrument for Bach's keyboard works. These have customarily been divided into two distinct groups, his works for organ and his works for harpsichord or clavichord. Although in early music the intended instrument was often not specified, but left to the performer, this was often not the case with Bach's music. Based on known manualiter settings within Bach's works for organ, the possible audience for performances of virtuosic keyboard compositions and the circumstances of their composition, Marshall has suggested that the concerto transcriptions BWV 972–987 might originally have been intended as manualiter settings for the organ. (Note: In Bach 2010, pp. 25–26, Dirksen takes issue with Marshall's suggestion on stylistic grounds, starting from the fact that the two arrangements of one of Prince Johann Ernst's concertos, BWV 592 and 592a, are explicitly designated for organ and cembalo.)

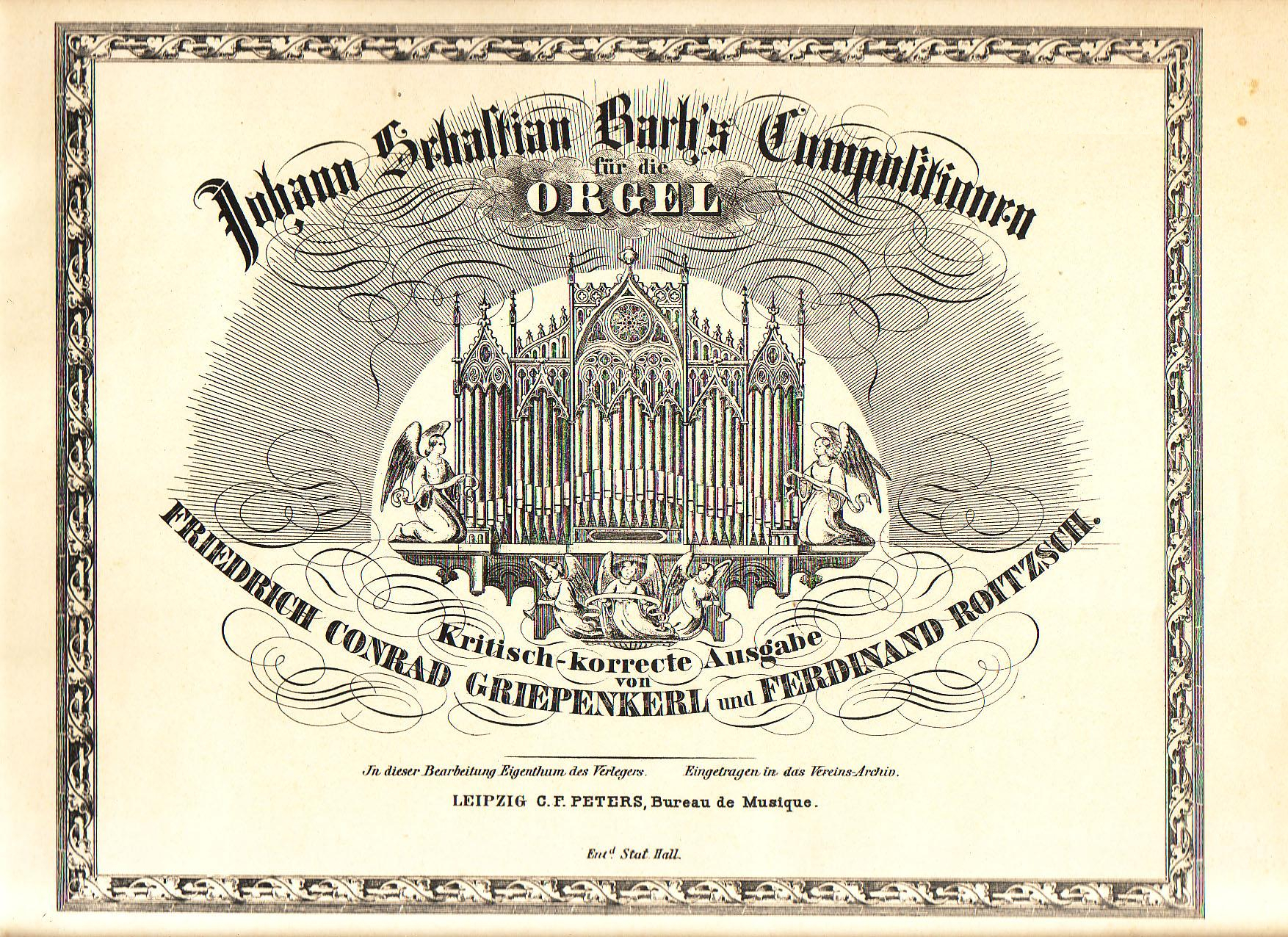
Cover for the C.F. Peters edition of Bach's organ works. BWV 592–595 appeared in 1852, edited by Friedrich Griepenkerl, a student of Forkel.

The reception of the concerto transcriptions is reflected in their transmission: they were less widely disseminated than Bach's original organ or keyboard works and were only published in the 1850s during the mid-nineteenth century Bach revival. More significantly perhaps, the concerto transcriptions played a decisive role in the Vivaldi revival which happened only in the following century. The meteoric success of Vivaldi in the early eighteenth century was matched by his descent into almost complete oblivion soon after his death in 1741. In Great Britain, France and particularly his native Italy, musical taste turned against him and, when he was remembered, it was just through salacious anecdote. Only in Northern Germany, where his concertos had influenced a school of composers, was his legacy properly appreciated. The publication of Bach's transcriptions has been recognized by Vivaldi scholars as a decisive step in his revival. In fact the new edition of the concerto transcriptions published by the Bach-Gesellschaft in the 1890s and the ensuing controversy in assessing their authorship and that of the original concertos in the 1910s sparked a reevaluation of Vivaldi and subsequently the rediscovery of his "lost" works.

Although no precise dating of the concerto transcriptions is possible, combining a careful scientific analysis of surviving manuscripts—including their watermarks—with a knowledge of documented events in Bach's life has given a clearer idea of when they might have been written: it is generally thought that most were probably written in the period 1713–1714, but that some could have been written later. The transcriptions themselves became known through a variety of sources. The two most significant for dating purposes are the autograph manuscript of the organ transcription BWV 596; and the hand copies of the organ transcription BWV 592 and the harpsichord transcriptions BWV 972–982 made by Bach's second cousin Johann Bernhard Bach from Eisenach, who is known to have visited Weimar in May 1715. These include all the transcriptions of the Venetian concertos (those by Vivaldi and the Marcello brothers). The remaining organ transcriptions come from copies made in Leipzig by Bach's family and circle: these include his eldest son Wilhelm Friedemann Bach, whose organ repertoire included the transcriptions; his pupil Johann Friedrich Agricola; and Johann Peter Kellner. The other harpsichord transcriptions BWV 983–987 are contained in a collection of manuscripts of Kellner ("Kellner's Miscellany"), copied by himself and others.

== Bach's transcriptions ==
=== Organ transcriptions, BWV 592–596 ===
These transcriptions for organ have been dated to 1713–1714. They are scored for two manual keyboards and pedal. (Note: For detailed commentaries on the organ transcriptions, not in this article, please see Williams (2003); note that there is an article on BWV 596, based on Williams (2003).)

==== Concerto in G major, BWV 592 ====
This concerto is a transcription of a concerto by Prince Johann Ernst of Saxe-Weimar.

==== Concerto in A minor, BWV 593 ====
This concerto is a transcription of Antonio Vivaldi's double violin concerto, Op. 3 No. 8, RV 522.

==== Concerto in C major, BWV 594 ====
This concerto is a transcription of Antonio Vivaldi's Grosso Mogul violin concerto, RV 208.

==== Concerto in C major, BWV 595 ====
This concerto movement is a transcription of a composition by Prince Johann Ernst of Saxe-Weimar.

==== Concerto in D minor, BWV 596 ====
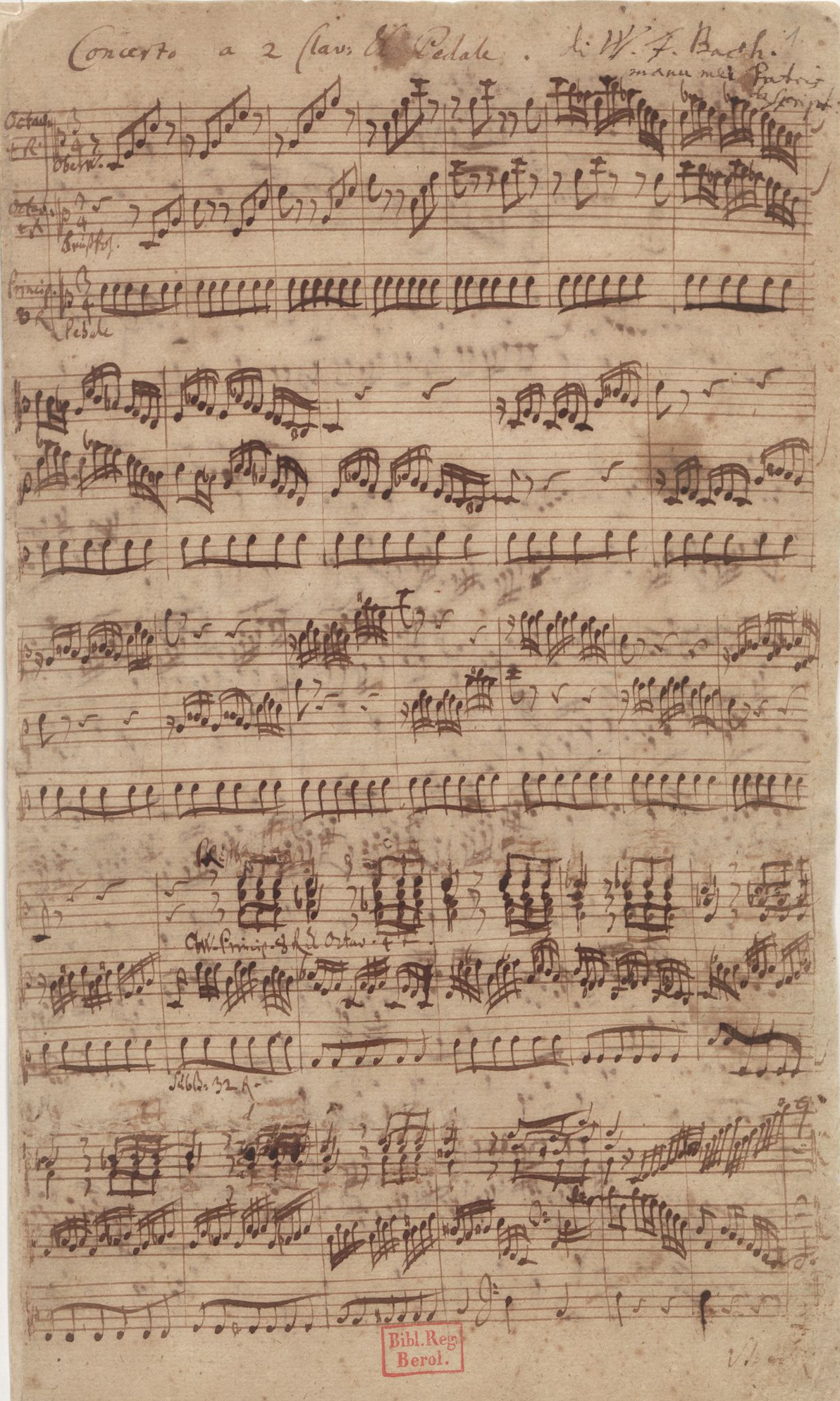
Autograph manuscript of first movement of BWV 596

This concerto is a transcription of Antonio Vivaldi's double violin concerto, Op. 3 No. 11, RV 565.

1. [Allegro]
2. Pieno. Grave – Fuge
3. Largo e spiccato
4. [Allegro]

This transcription of Vivaldi's concerto had the heading on the autograph manuscript altered by Bach's son Wilhelm Friedemann Bach who added "di W. F. Bach manu mei Patris descript" sixty or more years later. The result was that up until 1911 the transcription was misattributed to Wilhelm Friedemann. Despite the fact that Carl Friedrich Zelter, director of the Sing-Akademie zu Berlin where many Bach manuscripts were held, had suggested Johann Sebastian as the author, the transcription was first published as a work by Wilhelm Friedemann in 1844 in the edition prepared for C.F. Peters by Friedrich Griepenkerl. The precise dating and true authorship was later established from the manuscript: the handwriting and the watermarks in the manuscript paper conform to cantatas known to have been composed by Bach in Weimar in 1714–1715.

The autograph manuscript is remarkable for its detailed specifications of organ registration and use of the two manuals. As explained in Williams (2003), their main purpose was to enable the concerto to be heard at Bach's desired pitch. The markings are also significant for what they show about performance practise at that time: during the course of a single piece, hands could switch manuals and organ stops could be changed.

=== Harpsichord transcriptions, BWV 592a and 972–987 ===
(Note: For detailed commentaries on the harpsichord transcriptions, not in this article, please see Schulenberg (2013).)

==== Concerto in G major, BWV 592a ====
After a concerto by Prince Johann Ernst of Saxe-Weimar, and Bach's earlier organ transcription, BWV 592.

==== Concerto in D major, BWV 972 ====
After Violin Concerto in D major Op. 3 No. 9, RV 230, by Antonio Vivaldi. There is an early version of the transcription, BWV 972a.

==== Concerto in G major, BWV 973 ====
After Violin Concerto in G major, RV 299, by Antonio Vivaldi.

==== Concerto in D minor, BWV 974 ====
After Oboe Concerto in D minor by Alessandro Marcello.

==== Concerto in G minor, BWV 975 ====
After Violin Concerto in G minor, RV 316, by Antonio Vivaldi.

==== Concerto in C major, BWV 976 ====
After Violin Concerto in E major Op. 3 No. 12, RV 265, by Antonio Vivaldi.

==== Concerto in C major, BWV 977 ====
After an unidentified model.

==== Concerto in F major, BWV 978 ====
After Violin Concerto in G major Op. 3 No. 3, RV 310, by Antonio Vivaldi.

==== Concerto in B minor, BWV 979 ====
After Violin Concerto in D minor, RV 813, by Antonio Vivaldi (formerly RV Anh. 10 attributed to Giuseppe Torelli).

==== Concerto in G major, BWV 980 ====
After Violin Concerto in B♭ major, RV 383 by Antonio Vivaldi.

==== Concerto in C minor, BWV 981 ====
After 12 Concerti à cinque, Op. 1, No. 2 in E minor, by Benedetto Marcello.

==== Concerto in B♭ major, BWV 982 ====
After Violin Concerto in B♭ major Op. 1 No. 1 by Prince Johann Ernst of Saxe-Weimar.

==== Concerto in G minor, BWV 983 ====
After an unidentified model.

==== Concerto in C major, BWV 984 ====
After the Violin Concerto in C major by Prince Johann Ernst of Saxe–Weimar (like BWV 595).

==== Concerto in G minor, BWV 985 ====
After the Violin Concerto in G minor, TWV 51:g1, by Georg Philipp Telemann.

==== Concerto in G major, BWV 986 ====
After an unidentified model.

==== Concerto in D minor, BWV 987 ====
After Concerto Op. 1 No. 4 by Prince Johann Ernst of Saxe-Weimar.

== Models and comments ==
There are, or have been, attribution issues regarding some of the models Bach used for his keyboard transcriptions:

- The model for BWV 974 has been attributed to Antonio Vivaldi, Benedetto Marcello and Alessandro Marcello. In the second half of the 20th century the oboe concerto which was the model for Bach's transcription became attributed to Alessandro Marcello again —as it had been in its 1717 printed edition— through research of scholars such as Eleanor Selfridge-Field.
- The model for BWV 979 has been attributed to Vivaldi and to Giuseppe Torelli. Listed as No. 10 in the Anhang (Appendix) of the Ryom-Verzeichnis (RV), it was generally attributed to Torelli. Federico Maria Sardelli argued against the attribution to Torelli, and in favour of an attribution to Vivaldi, in an article published in 2005. Consequently, the concerto was relisted as RV 813. The composition originated before 1711: for instance its seven movements and its second viola part are not compatible with Vivaldi's later style.
- No models have been identified for BWV 977, 983 and 986. Stylistically BWV 977 is more Italianate than BWV 983 and 986. David Schulenberg supposes an Italian model for BWV 977, and German models for the other two concertos.

Weimar concerto transcriptions (3rd column: p = pedaliter/organ; m = manualiter/harpsichord)
BWV	Key		Model	P 280	Other Ms.	BDW
592	G major	p	Johann Ernst of Saxe-Weimar: Violin Concerto in G major	11	P 804/31; D-LEb Peters Ms. 11	00674
592a	G major	m	Johann Ernst of Saxe-Weimar: Violin Concerto in G major; BWV 592		D-LEm Poel. mus. Ms. 29/1	00675
593	A minor	p	Vivaldi, Op. 3 No. 8: Concerto in A minor for two violins and strings, RV 522		P 400b	00676
594	C major	p	Vivaldi, RV 208: Violin Concerto in D major Grosso Mogul		P 400c D-LEu N.I.5137 and 5138	00677
595	C major	p	Johann Ernst of Saxe-Weimar: Violin Concerto in C major, first movement, and/or BWV 984/1		P 286/6	00678
596	D minor	p	Vivaldi, Op. 3 No. 11: Concerto in D minor for two violins, cello and strings, RV 565		P 330 (autograph)	00679
972	D major	m	Vivaldi, Op. 3 No. 9: Violin Concerto in D major, RV 230; BWV 972a	1	P 804/55	01149
972a	D major	m	Vivaldi, Op. 3 No. 9: Violin Concerto in D major, RV 230		B-Bc 25448 MSM/3	01150
973	G major	m	Vivaldi, RV 299: Violin Concerto in G major (published as Op. 7 No. 8)	2	P 804/54; D-LEm Poel. mus. Ms. 29/4	01151
974	D minor	m	Marcello, A.: Oboe Concerto in D minor	3	P 804/4; D-DS Mus. ms. 66	01152
975	G minor	m	Vivaldi, RV 316 (variant RV 316a, Violin Concerto in G minor, published as Op. 4 No. 6)	4		01153
976	C major	m	Vivaldi, Op. 3 No. 12: Violin Concerto in E major, RV 265	5	P 804/15	01154
977	C major	m		6	P 804/56	01155
978	F major	m	Vivaldi, Op. 3 No. 3: Violin Concerto in G major, RV 310	7		01156
979	B minor	m	Vivaldi, RV 813: Violin Concerto in D minor (formerly RV Anh. 10 attributed to Torelli)	8		01157
980	G major	m	Vivaldi, RV 383: Violin Concerto in B♭ major, (variant RV 383a published as Op. 4 No. 1)	9		01158
981	C minor	m	Marcello, B.: Concerto Op. 1 No. 2	10	B-Bc 25448 MSM/4; P 801/28; D-LEb Peters Ms. 8/29	01159
982	B♭ major	m	Johann Ernst of Saxe-Weimar: Concerto Op. 1 No. 1	12		01160
983	G minor	m			P 804/35; D-LEm Poel. mus. Ms. 29/3	01161
984	C major	m	Johann Ernst of Saxe-Weimar: Violin Concerto in C major and possibly BWV 595		P 804/52; D-LEm Poel. mus. Ms. 29/2; D-LEb Peters Ms. 8/28	01162
985	G minor	m	Telemann: Violin Concerto in G minor, TWV 51:g1		P 804/28	01163
986	G major	m			P 804/46	01164
987	D minor	m	Johann Ernst of Saxe-Weimar: Concerto Op. 1 No. 4		P 804/34	01165

=== After Vivaldi ===
Bach transcribed seven concertos by Antonio Vivaldi for solo harpsichord (RV 230, 265, 299, 310, 316, 381 and 813), and three for solo organ (RV 208, 522 and 565).

==== From L'estro armonico ====
Bach transcribed two concertos of Antonio Vivaldi's Op. 3, L'estro armonico for organ (BWV 593 and 596), and three concertos of that collection for unaccompanied harpsichord (BWV 972, 976 and 978):

- After Vivaldi's Op. 3 No. 3 (Violin Concerto in G major, RV 310): Concerto in F major, BWV 978
- After Vivaldi's Op. 3 No. 8 (Concerto in A minor for two violins and strings, RV 522): Concerto in A minor, BWV 593
- After Vivaldi's Op. 3 No. 9 (Violin Concerto in D major, RV 230): Concerto in D major, BWV 972, and earlier version BWV 972a
- After Vivaldi's Op. 3 No. 11 (Concerto in D minor for two violins, cello and strings, RV 565): Concerto in D minor, BWV 596
- After Vivaldi's Op. 3 No. 12 (Violin Concerto in E major, RV 265): Concerto in C major, BWV 976

Later Bach arranged Vivaldi's Op. 3 No. 10 (RV 580) to a concerto for four harpsichords and strings (BWV 1065).

==== Concertos circulating as manuscript ====
Bach realised his other transcriptions of concertos by Vivaldi after versions circulating as manuscript. Later versions of some of these concertos by Vivaldi were published in his Op. 4 and 7:

- After Vivaldi's Violin Concerto in B♭ major (later version published as Op. 4 No. 1, RV 383a): Concerto in G major, BWV 980 (harpsichord)
- After Vivaldi's Violin Concerto in G minor, RV 316 (later version published as Op. 4 No. 6, RV 316a): Concerto in G minor, BWV 975 (harpsichord)
- After Vivaldi's Violin Concerto in G major (later version published as Op. 7 No. 8, RV 299): Concerto in G major, BWV 973 (harpsichord)
- After Vivaldi's Violin Concerto Grosso Mogul in D major, RV 208 (later version published as Op. 7 No. 11, RV 208a): Concerto in C major, BWV 594 (organ)
- After Vivaldi's Violin Concerto in D minor, RV 813 (formerly RV Anh. 10 often attributed to Torelli): Concerto in B minor, BWV 979 (harpsichord)

=== After other Venetian composers ===
Apart from the concertos after models by Antonio Vivaldi (including one formerly attributed to Torelli), Bach also transcribed concertos by the Venetian brothers Alessandro and Benedetto Marcello. Benedetto was a more prolific composer than his elder brother Alessandro.

==== Benedetto Marcello's Op. 1 No. 2 ====
Benedetto Marcello's Op. 1, containing twelve concerti à cinque, was published in 1708. The second concerto in that collection, in E minor, had a violino principale in its first two movements.

- BWV 981 – Concerto in C minor, after Benedetto Marcello's Concerto Op. 1 No. 2

==== Alessandro Marcello's Oboe concerto ====
Bach based his transcription of Marcello's oboe concerto on a lost manuscript that was circulating before the concerto was published in 1717.

- BWV 974 – Concerto in D minor, after Alessandro Marcello's Oboe Concerto in D minor

=== After Telemann ===
BWV 985 is a Concerto in G minor for unaccompanied harpsichord, after Georg Philipp Telemann's Violin Concerto in G minor, TWV 51:g1.

BWV Anh. 213 is a lost Concerto in F major for solo organ, after an unidentified concerto by Georg Philipp Telemann.

=== After Prince Johann Ernst of Saxe–Weimar ===
Prince Johann Ernst of Saxe-Weimar's Op. 1 was published posthumously, some time after Bach had provided solo harpsichord arrangements for two out of six concertos contained in that bundle:

- After Johann Ernst's Op. 1 No. 1: Concerto in B♭ major, BWV 982
- After Johann Ernst's Op. 1 No. 4: Concerto in D minor, BWV 987

Concerto in G major, after Johann Ernst's Violin Concerto in G major:

- BWV 592: pedaliter version
- BWV 592a: manualiter version

Concerto in C major after Johann Ernst's Violin Concerto in C major:

- BWV 984: harpsichord version
- BWV 595: organ version (first movement only)

=== After unidentified models ===
There is no extant model for a few of Bach's concerto transcriptions for harpsichord:

- BWV 977 – Concerto in C major
- BWV 983 – Concerto in G minor
- BWV 986 – Concerto in G major

== Notes and references ==
=== Sources ===
- Bach, J.S. (2010), Dirksen, Pieter (ed.), Sonatas, Trios, Concertos, Complete Organ Works (Breitkopf Urtext), vol. 5 EB 8805, Wiesbaden: Breitkopf & Härtel, ISMN 979-0-004-18366-3 Introduction Archived 2015-09-13 at the Wayback Machine (in German and English) • Commentary Archived 2023-01-09 at the Wayback Machine (English translation—commentary in paperback original is in German)
- Boyd, Malcolm (2001), Bach, Master Musician Series, Oxford University Press, pp. 80–83, ISBN 9780195307719
- Boyd, Malcolm (2006), Bach, Oxford University Press, ISBN 9780195307719
- Breig, Werner (1997a), "The Instrumental Music", in John Butt (ed.), The Cambridge Companion to Bach, pp. 123–135, ISBN 9781139002158
- Breig, Werner (1997b), "Composition as arrangement and adaptation", in John Butt (ed.), The Cambridge Companion to Bach, pp. 154–170, ISBN 9781139002158
- Brover-Lubovsky, Bella (2008), Tonal Space in the Music of Antonio Vivaldi, Indiana University Press, ISBN 978-0253351296
- Butler, H. Joseph (2011), "Emulation and Inspiration: J. S. Bach's Transcriptions from Vivaldi's L'estro armonico" (PDF), The Diapason: 19–21, archived from the original (PDF) on 2015-11-29
- David, Hans Theodore; Mendel, Arthur; Wolff, Christoph (1998). The New Bach Reader (revised ed.). W. W. Norton. ISBN 0393319563.]
- Forkel, Johann Nikolaus (1920), Charles Sanford Terry (historian) (ed.), Johann Sebastian Bach: His Life, Art, and Work, Harcourt, Brace and Howe
- Hanks, Sarah Elizabeth (2001). "Johann Ernst, Prince of Weimar". Grove Music Online (8th ed.). Oxford University Press. ISBN 978-1-56159-263-0. (subscription, Wikilibrary access, or UK public library membership required)
- Hirschmann, Wolfgang (2013), "'He Liked to Hear the Music of Others': Individuality and Variety in the Works of Bach and His German Contemporaries", in Andrew Talle (ed.), Bach Perspectives, Volume 9: J.S. Bach and His Contemporaries in Germany, University of Illinois Press, pp. 1–23, ISBN 978-0252095399
- Jones, Richard (2007), The Creative Development of Johann Sebastian Bach: Music to Delight the Spirit, Volume I: 1695–1717, Oxford University Press, pp. 140–153, ISBN 9780198164401
- Marshall, Robert (1986), "Organ or 'Klavier'? Instrumental prescriptions in the sources of Bach's keyboard works", in George Stauffer; Ernest May (eds.), J.S. Bach as Organist, Indiana University Press, pp. 212–239
- Milka, Anatoly (2019), "The credibility of the witness Willhelm Friedemann", Rethinking J.S. Bach's Musical Offering, Cambridge Scholars Publishing, pp. 14–19, ISBN 9781527541016
- Pincherle, Marc (1962), Vivaldi: Genius of the Baroque, translated by Christopher Hatch, W.W. Norton, ISBN 0393001687
- Schneider, Max (1911), "Das Sogenannte 'Orgelkonzert d-moll von Willhelm Friedemann Bach'", Bach-Jahrbuch: 23–26
- Schulenberg, David (2013), The Keyboard Music of J.S. Bach, Routledge, pp. 117–139, ISBN 9781136091469; Updates (2016)
- Schulze, Hans-Joachim (1978), "J. S. Bachs Konzertbearbeitungen nach Vivaldi und anderen: Studien- oder Auftragswerke?", Deutsches Jahrbuch der Musikwissenschaft für 1973–1977, Leipzig: Edition Peters, pp. 80–100
- Selfridge-Field, Eleanor (1990), The Music of Benedetto and Alessandro Marcello: A Thematic Catalogue with Commentary on the Composers, Repertory, and Sources, Oxford University Press, ISBN 9780193161269
- Talbot, Michael (1993), Vivaldi, The Master Musicians (2nd ed.), J. M. Dent, ISBN 0460861085
- Talbot, Michael, ed. (2011), The Vivaldi Compendium, Boydell Press, ISBN 9781843836704
- Williams, Peter (2003), The Organ Music of J. S. Bach (2nd ed.), Cambridge University Press, pp. 201–224, ISBN 0-521-89115-9
- Williams, Peter (2016), Bach: A Musical Biography, Cambridge University Press, ISBN 9781107139251
- Zohn, Steven (2008), Music for a Mixed Taste: Style, Genre, and Meaning in Telemann's Instrumental Works, Oxford University Press, ISBN 978-0190247850
