= List of concertos for harpsichord solo by J. S. Bach =

Italian Concerto, BWV 971, performed on harpsichord by Martha Goldstein
I. (Allegro)

II. Andante

III. Presto

Apart from his orchestral keyboard concertos and his solo organ concertos, Johann Sebastian Bach composed keyboard concertos for unaccompanied harpsichord:

- Most of his Weimar concerto transcriptions, over twenty arrangements of Italian and Italianate orchestral concertos which he produced around 1713–1714 when he was employed in Weimar, were written for solo harpsichord (BWV 592a and 972–987).
- Two decades later, some ten years after he had become Thomaskantor in Leipzig, he wrote a concerto for two harpsichords, BWV 1061a, which was later orchestrated as BWV 1061.
- The Italian Concerto, BWV 971, was published in 1735 as part of his Clavier-Übung II.

== Weimar concerto transcriptions ==
In his Weimar period, Johann Sebastian Bach transcribed Italian and Italianate concertos. Most, if not all, of the concerto transcriptions for unaccompanied harpsichord were realised from July 1713 to July 1714. Most of these transcriptions were based on concertos by Antonio Vivaldi. Other models for the transcriptions included concertos by Alessandro Marcello, Benedetto Marcello, Georg Philipp Telemann and Prince Johann Ernst of Saxe-Weimar.

Weimar concerto transcriptions (harpsichord)
| BWV | Key | Model |
|---|---|---|
| 592a | G major | Johann Ernst of Saxe-Weimar: Violin Concerto in G major; BWV 592 |
| 972 | D major | Vivaldi, Op. 3 No. 9: Violin Concerto in D major, RV 230 |
| 972a | D major | Vivaldi, Op. 3 No. 9: Violin Concerto in D major, RV 230 |
| 973 | G major | Vivaldi, RV 299: Violin Concerto in G major (published as Op. 7 No. 8) |
| 974 | D minor | Marcello, A.: Oboe Concerto in D minor |
| 975 | G minor | Vivaldi, RV 316 (variant RV 316a, Violin Concerto in G minor, published as Op. 4 No. 6) |
| 976 | C major | Vivaldi, Op. 3 No. 12: Violin Concerto in E major, RV 265 |
| 977 | C major | |
| 978 | F major | Vivaldi, Op. 3 No. 3: Violin Concerto in G major, RV 310 |
| 979 | B minor | Vivaldi, RV 813: Violin Concerto in D minor (formerly RV Anh. 10 attributed to Torelli) |
| 980 | G major | Vivaldi, RV 383: Violin Concerto in B♭ major, (variant RV 383a published as Op. 4 No. 1) |
| 981 | C minor | Marcello, B.: Concerto Op. 1 No. 2 |
| 982 | B♭ major | Johann Ernst of Saxe-Weimar: Concerto Op. 1 No. 1 |
| 983 | G minor | |
| 984 | C major | Johann Ernst of Saxe-Weimar: Violin Concerto in C major and possibly BWV 595 |
| 985 | G minor | Telemann: Violin Concerto in G minor, TWV 51:g1 |
| 986 | G major | |
| 987 | D minor | Johann Ernst of Saxe-Weimar: Concerto Op. 1 No. 4 |

=== Concerto in G major, BWV 592a ===
After Violin Concerto in G major by Prince Johann Ernst of Saxe-Weimar, and organ version BWV 592.

There are three movements:

1. [no tempo indication]
2. Grave
3. Presto

=== Concerto in D major, BWV 972 ===
I. Allegro

II. Largo – Larghetto

III. Allegro
All of the above performed by Wanda Landowska (972).

After Violin Concerto in D major Op. 3 No. 9 (RV 230) by Antonio Vivaldi. There is an earlier version of this arrangement, BWV 972a.

There are three movements:

1. [no tempo indication]
2. Largo- Larghetto
3. Allegro

=== Concerto in G major, BWV 973 ===
After Violin Concerto in G major, RV 299, by Antonio Vivaldi (later version published as Op. 7 No. 8).

There are three movements:

1. [no tempo indication]
2. Largo
3. Allegro

=== Concerto in D minor, BWV 974 ===
After Oboe Concerto in D minor by Alessandro Marcello.

There are three movements:

1. [no tempo indication]
2. Adagio
3. Presto

=== Concerto in G minor, BWV 975 ===
After Violin Concerto in G minor, RV 316, by Antonio Vivaldi (variant RV 316a, published as Op. 4 No. 6).

There are three movements:

1. [no tempo indication]
2. Largo
3. Giga Presto

=== Concerto in C major, BWV 976 ===
After Violin Concerto in E major Op. 3 No. 12 (RV 265) by Antonio Vivaldi.

There are three movements:

1. [no tempo indication]
2. Largo
3. Allegro

=== Concerto in C major, BWV 977 ===
After an unidentified model.

There are three movements:

1. [no tempo indication]
2. Adagio
3. Giga

=== Concerto in F major, BWV 978 ===
After Violin Concerto in G major Op. 3 No. 3 (RV 310) by Antonio Vivaldi.

There are three movements:

1. Allegro
2. Largo
3. Allegro

=== Concerto in B minor, BWV 979 ===
After Violin Concerto in D minor, RV 813, by Antonio Vivaldi (formerly RV Anh. 10 attributed to Torelli).

There are five movements:

1. Allegro – Adagio
2. Allegro
3. Andante
4. Adagio
5. Allegro

=== Concerto in G major, BWV 980 ===
After Violin Concerto in B♭ major, RV 383 by Antonio Vivaldi (variant RV 383a published as Op. 4 No. 1).

There are three movements:

1. [no tempo indication]
2. Largo
3. Allegro

=== Concerto in C minor, BWV 981 ===
After Violin Concerto in C minor Op. 1 No. 2 by Benedetto Marcello.

There are four movements:

1. Adagio
2. Vivace
3. [no tempo indication]
4. Prestissimo

=== Concerto in B♭ major, BWV 982 ===
After Violin Concerto in B♭ major Op. 1 No. 1 by Prince Johann Ernst of Saxe-Weimar.

There are four movements:

1. [no tempo indication]
2. Adagio
3. Allegro
4. Allegro

=== Concerto in G minor, BWV 983 ===
After an unidentified model.

There are three movements:

1. [no tempo indication]
2. Adagio
3. Allegro

=== Concerto in C major, BWV 984 ===
After the Violin Concerto in C major by Prince Johann Ernst of Saxe–Weimar (like BWV 595).

There are three movements:

1. [no tempo indication]
2. Adagio e affettoso
3. Allegro assai

=== Concerto in G minor, BWV 985 ===
After the Violin Concerto in G minor, TWV 51:g1, by Georg Philipp Telemann.

There are three movements:

1. [no tempo indication]
2. Adagio
3. Allegro

=== Concerto in G major, BWV 986 ===
After an unidentified model.

There are three movements:

1. [no tempo indication]
2. Adagio
3. Allegro

=== Concerto in D minor, BWV 987 ===
After Concerto Op. 1 No. 4 by Prince Johann Ernst of Saxe-Weimar.

There are four movements:

1. [no tempo indication]
2. Allegro
3. Adagio
4. Vivace

== Original compositions ==
Bach composed unaccompanied keyboard concertos for one and two harpsichords.

=== Italian Concerto included in Clavier-Übung II ===
Bach's Italian Concerto, BWV 971, was published in 1735, as first of two compositions included in Clavier-Übung II. An early version of the concerto's first movement survives in an 18th-century copy.

=== Early version of Concerto for two harpsichords, BWV 1061 ===
BWV 1061a, a concerto for two harpsichords without accompaniment, is Bach's original version of the Concerto for two harpsichords and strings, BWV 1061.

== Doubtful works ==
Several concertos for unaccompanied harpsichord are listed as doubtful in Anhang II of the 1998 edition of the Bach-Werke-Verzeichnis:

- BWV 909 – Concerto and Fugue in C minor
- BWV Anh. 151 – Concerto in C major
- BWV Anh. 152 – Concerto in G major

== Discography ==
=== BWV 592a and 972–987 ===
- Pieter Dirksen (1999). Brilliant Classics 99372/3 and /4.

=== BWV 909 ===
- Guy Penson (1986). Ricercar RIC 038014
- Christiane Wuyts (1988). Brilliant Classics 99362/9.

=== BWV 1061a ===
- Guillermo Brachetta and Menno van Delft (2016). Resonus RES 10189.

== Manuscripts ==
- 25448 MSM at Conservatoire royal de Bruxelles (RISM 702002232): Fascicles 3 (BWV 972a) and 4 (BWV 981) at Bach Digital
- D-DS Mus. ms. 66 at Universitäts- und Landesbibliothek Darmstadt (BWV 974; RISM 450001735; D-DS Mus. ms. 66 at Bach Digital)
- D-LEb Peters Ms. 8 at Stadtbibliothek Leipzig/Bach Archive: Fascicles 14 (BWV 971), 28 (BWV 984) and 29 (BWV 981) at Bach Digital
- D-LEm Poel. mus. Ms. 29 at Stadtbibliothek Leipzig (BWV 592a, 973 and 983–4; D-LEm Poel. mus. Ms. 29 at Bach Digital)
- Mus.ms. Bach P 280 at Berlin State Library (BWV 592 and 973–982; RISM 467300717; D-B Mus. ms. Bach P 280 at Bach Digital)
- Mus.ms. Bach P 801 (28) at Berlin State Library ("Concerto di Marcello", BWV 981; RISM 467300247; D-B Mus. ms. Bach P 801, Fascicle 28 at Bach Digital)
- Mus.ms. Bach P 804 at Berlin State Library (RISM 467300254): Fascicles 4 (BWV 974), 15 (BWV 976), 28 (BWV 985), 34 (BWV 987), 35 (BWV 983), 46 (BWV 986), 52 (BWV 984), 54 (BWV 973), 55 (BWV 972) and 56 (BWV 977) at Bach Digital
- Mus.ms. Bach St 139, Fascicle 1 at Berlin State Library (autograph parts of BWV 1061a; D-B Mus. ms. Bach St 139, Faszikel 1 at Bach Digital)

== Sources ==
- Kirsten Beißwenger. "An early version of the first movement of the Italian Concerto BWV 971 from the Scholz collection?" pp. 1–19 in Bach Studies 2 edited by Daniel R. Melamed. Cambridge University Press, 2006. ISBN 9780521028912
- Boyd, Malcolm (2000), Bach, Master Musician Series, Oxford University Press, pp. 80–83, ISBN 0195142225
- Breig, Werner (1997a), "The Instrumental Music", in John Butt (ed.), The Cambridge Companion to Bach, pp. 123–135, ISBN 9781139002158
- Butler, H. Joseph (2011), "Emulation and Inspiration: J. S. Bach's Transcriptions from Vivaldi's L'estro armonico" (PDF), The Diapason: 19–21, archived from the original (PDF) on 2015-11-29
- Jones, Richard (2007), The Creative Development of Johann Sebastian Bach: Music to Delight the Spirit, Volume I: 1695-1717, Oxford University Press, pp. 140–153, ISBN 9780198164401
- Schulenberg, David (2013), The Keyboard Music of J.S. Bach, Routledge, pp. 117–139, ISBN 9781136091469, Updates (2016)
- Selfridge-Field, Eleanor (1990), The Music of Benedetto and Alessandro Marcello: A Thematic Catalogue with Commentary on the Composers, Repertory, and Sources, Oxford University Press, ISBN 9780193161269
- Talbot, Michael, ed. (2011), The Vivaldi Compendium, Boydell Press, ISBN 9781843836704
- Williams, Peter (2003), The Organ Music of J. S. Bach (2nd ed.), Cambridge University Press, pp. 201–224, ISBN 0-521-89115-9
