= Grosso mogul =

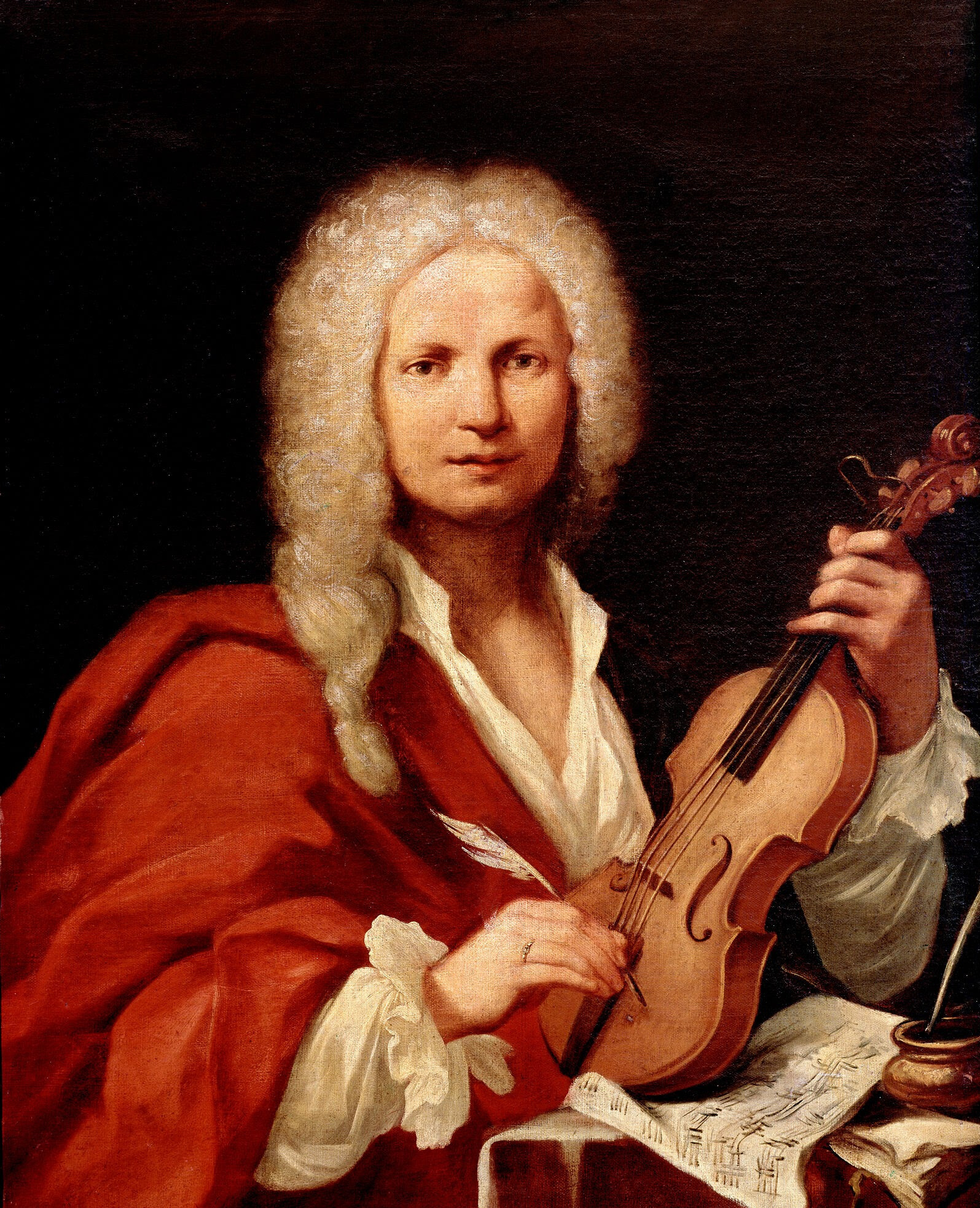
18th-century portrait of a Venetian violinist, presumably Antonio Vivaldi

Grosso mogul, also Il grosso mogul (“[The] Great Moghul”), RV 208, is a violin concerto in D major by Antonio Vivaldi. The concerto, in three movements, is an early work by the Venetian composer. Around the mid-1710s Johann Sebastian Bach transcribed the concerto for organ, BWV 594, in C major. A simplified version of the violin concerto, RV 208a, without the elaborated cadenzas that appear in manuscript versions of RV 208, and with a different middle movement, was published around 1720 in Amsterdam as concerto #11 of Vivaldi's Op. 7.

== History ==
Vivaldi's violin concerto in D major, RV 208, survives in three manuscripts:

- Vivaldi's autograph score, conserved in Turin.
- A copy of the parts, conserved in the Landesbibliothek Mecklenburg-Vorpommern Günther Uecker in Schwerin.
- Another copy of the parts conserved in Cividale del Friuli.

The Grosso Mogul title appears on the Schwerin manuscript, which was written before 1717. According to Michael Talbot, the name of the concerto can possibly be linked to Domenico Lalli's Il gran Mogol opera libretto, a setting of which had been presented in Naples in 1713. Later settings of this libretto include Giovanni Porta's, staged in Venice in 1717, and Vivaldi's RV 697 (1730) renamed Argippo, which is entirely set in the Mughal Empire. The violin concerto RV 208 was intended to be played as an interlude during Argippo's performances.

The Schwerin and Cividale del Friuli copies of the concerto contain two variants of extended cadenzas for unaccompanied violin, in the first and last movements of the concerto. The autograph version indicates where such cadenzas can be inserted in these movements, but does not contain the cadenzas. A manuscript with the written-out cadenzas must have been circulating before c. 1713–1714 when Bach transcribed such versions for solo organ (BWV 594).

An earlier version of the concerto, RV 208a, was probably composed by c. 1712–1713. This version has a different middle movement than the RV 208 version. Vivaldi seems to have had no supervision over the Op. 7 collection, published around 1720 in Amsterdam by the Roger firm, in which the older RV 208a version of the concerto was retained. This version of the concerto does not contain the extended cadenzas, nor an indication where such cadenzas could be inserted.

== Movements ==
The concerto has been transmitted in a version for violin soloist, strings (two violin parts and one viola part), and basso continuo. It has three movements:

1. Allegro,, D major
2. Recitative: Grave,, B minor – this movement is performed by the violin soloist exclusively accompanied by the thoroughbass.
3. Allegro, 3/4, D major

=== First movement ===
The first movement, in D Major is in Ritornello form. The first solo episode consists of sixteenth notes, with double stops on every beat.

=== Second movement ===
The second movement, in B Minor is for the solo violin and basso continuo. There are strange rhythms, like improvisation.

=== Third movement ===
The third movement, in D Major, is in Ritornello form, and is the most virtuosic of the 3 movements.

== Sources ==
- Brover-Lubovsky, Bella (2008). Tonal Space in the Music of Antonio Vivaldi. Bloomington: Indiana University Press. ISBN 978-0-253-35129-6.
- Dirksen, Pieter [in Dutch] (1992). "The Background to Bach's Fifth Brandenburg Concerto". The Harpsichord and its Repertoire: Proceedings of the International Harpsichord Symposium, Utrecht, 1990. Utrecht: STIMU Foundation for Historical Performance Practice. pp. 157–185. ISBN 9072786033.
- Heller, Karl (1997). Antonio Vivaldi: The Red Priest of Venice. Hal Leonard. ISBN 1574670158.
- Rasch, Rudolf (2017). "La famosa mano di Monsieur Roger: Antonio Vivaldi and his Dutch Publishers". In Talbot, Michael (ed.). Vivaldi. Routledge. pp. 241–290. ISBN 9781351537315.
- Talbot, Michael (2011). The Vivaldi Compendium. Boydell Press. ISBN 9781843836704.
