= Organ concerto (Bach) =

Group of compositions by Johann Sebastian Bach

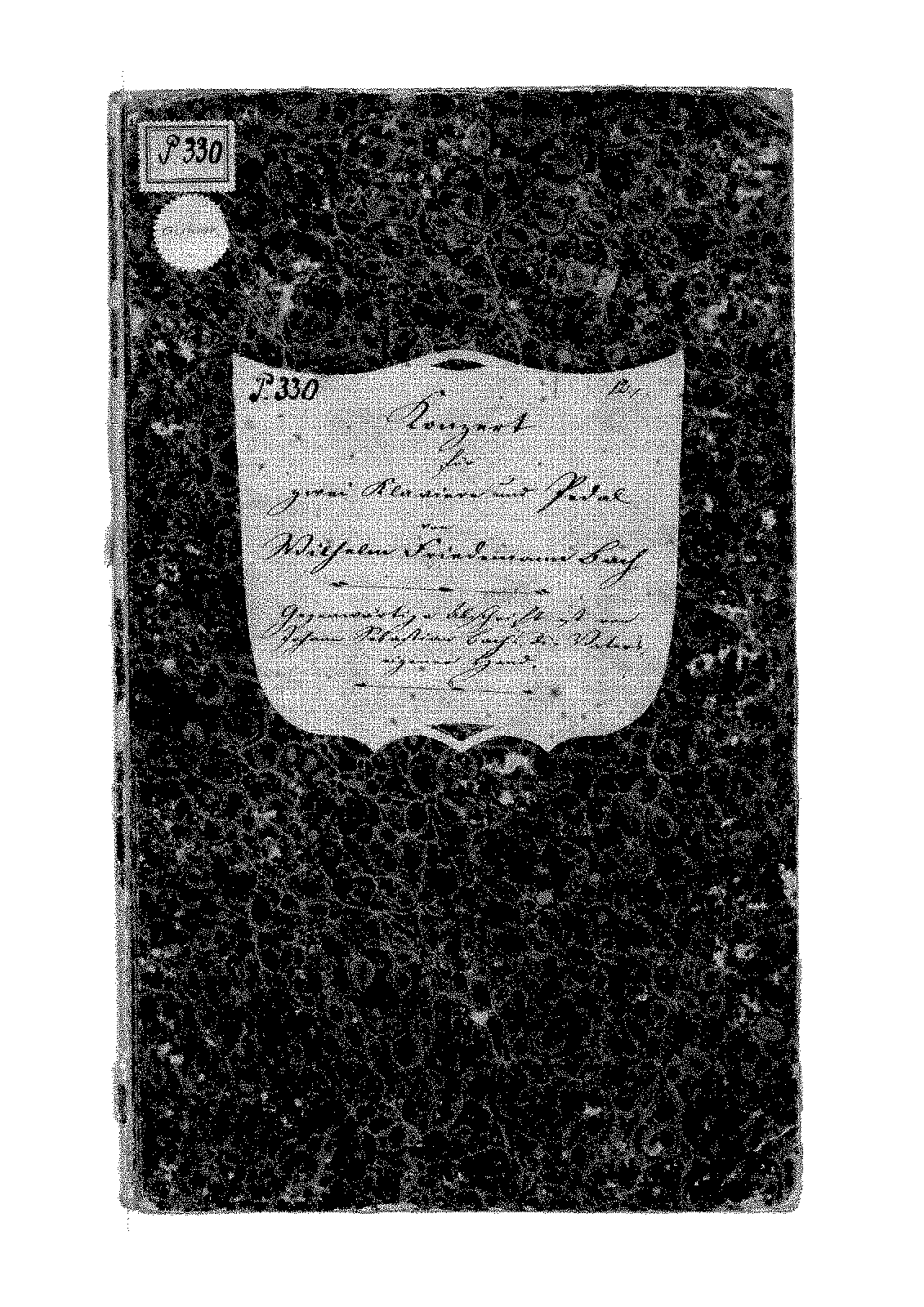
Title page of manuscript, organ concerto BWV 596.

The organ concertos of Johann Sebastian Bach are solo works for organ, transcribed and reworked from instrumental concertos originally composed by Antonio Vivaldi and the musically talented Prince Johann Ernst of Saxe-Weimar. While there is no doubt about the authenticity of BWV 592–596, the sixth concerto BWV 597 is now probably considered to be spurious. Composed during Bach's second period at the court in Weimar (1708–1717), the concertos can be dated more precisely to 1713–1714.

Bach also made several transcriptions of Vivaldi's concertos for single, two and four harpsichords from exactly the same period in Weimar. The original concertos were picked from Vivaldi's Op.3, L'estro armonico, composed in 1711, a set of twelve concertos for one, two and four violins. The publication of these Bach transcriptions by C.F. Peters in the 1850s and Breitkopf & Härtel in the 1890s played a decisive role in the Vivaldi revival of the twentieth century.

There are six organ concertos:

Organ concertos by Johann Sebastian Bach
BWV	Key	Movements
592	G major	[Allegro] – Grave – [Presto]
593	A minor	[Allegro (or) Tempo Giusto] – Adagio – Allegro
594	C major	[Allegro] – Recitativ, Adagio – Allegro
595	C major	[no tempo indication]
596	D minor	[Allegro] - Grave - Fuga – Largo e spiccato – [Allegro]
597	E♭ major	[no tempo indication] – Gigue

== Weimar concerto transcriptions ==
In his Weimar period Bach transcribed concertos by, among others, Antonio Vivaldi and Prince Johann Ernst of Saxe-Weimar for organ and for harpsichord. Most of the harpsichord transcriptions probably originated between July 1713 and July 1714. The organ concertos, BWV 592–596, are scored for two manual keyboards and pedal, and probably originated from 1714 to 1717.

Weimar concerto transcriptions (organ)
BWV	Key	Model
592	G major	Johann Ernst of Saxe-Weimar: Violin Concerto in G major, a 8
593	A minor	Vivaldi, Op. 3 No. 8: Concerto in A minor for two violins, RV 522
594	C major	Vivaldi, RV 208: Violin Concerto Grosso Mogul in D major
595	C major	Johann Ernst of Saxe-Weimar: Violin Concerto in C major, first movement, and/or BWV 984/1
596	D minor	Vivaldi, Op. 3 No. 11: Concerto in D minor for two violins, cello and strings, RV 565

=== Concerto in G major, BWV 592 ===
This concerto is a transcription of Prince Johann Ernst of Saxe-Weimar's Violin Concerto a 8 in G major. Bach arranged the same concerto for harpsichord (BWV 592a). There are three movements:

1. [without tempo indication – "Allegro assai" in the original]
2. Grave (E minor)
3. [without tempo indication – "Presto e staccato" in the original, "Presto" in Bach's harpsichord version]

=== Concerto in A minor, BWV 593 ===
This concerto is a transcription of Antonio Vivaldi's double violin concerto in A minor, Op. 3 No. 8, RV 522. There are three movements:

1. [without tempo indication – "Allegro" in Vivaldi's original]
2. Adagio (senza pedale a due claviere) (D minor) ["Larghetto e spiritoso" in Vivaldi's original]
3. Allegro

=== Concerto in C major, BWV 594 ===
This concerto is a transcription of Antonio Vivaldi's Grosso mogul violin concerto in D major, RV 208, of which a variant, RV 208a, was published as Op. 7 No. 11. There are three movements:

1. [without tempo indication – "Allegro" in Vivaldi's original]
2. Recitativ: Adagio (A minor; "Recitative: Grave" in Vivaldi's original)
3. Allegro - Cadenza - Allegro

=== Concerto in C major, BWV 595 ===
A transcription of the first movement of a lost concerto by Prince Johann Ernst of Saxe-Weimar, which has been reconstructed as a Concerto for Two Violins in C major. There is only one movement, without tempo indication, but also indicated as Allegro. There is also a variant for harpsichord, BWV 984 (first movement).

=== Concerto in D minor, BWV 596 ===
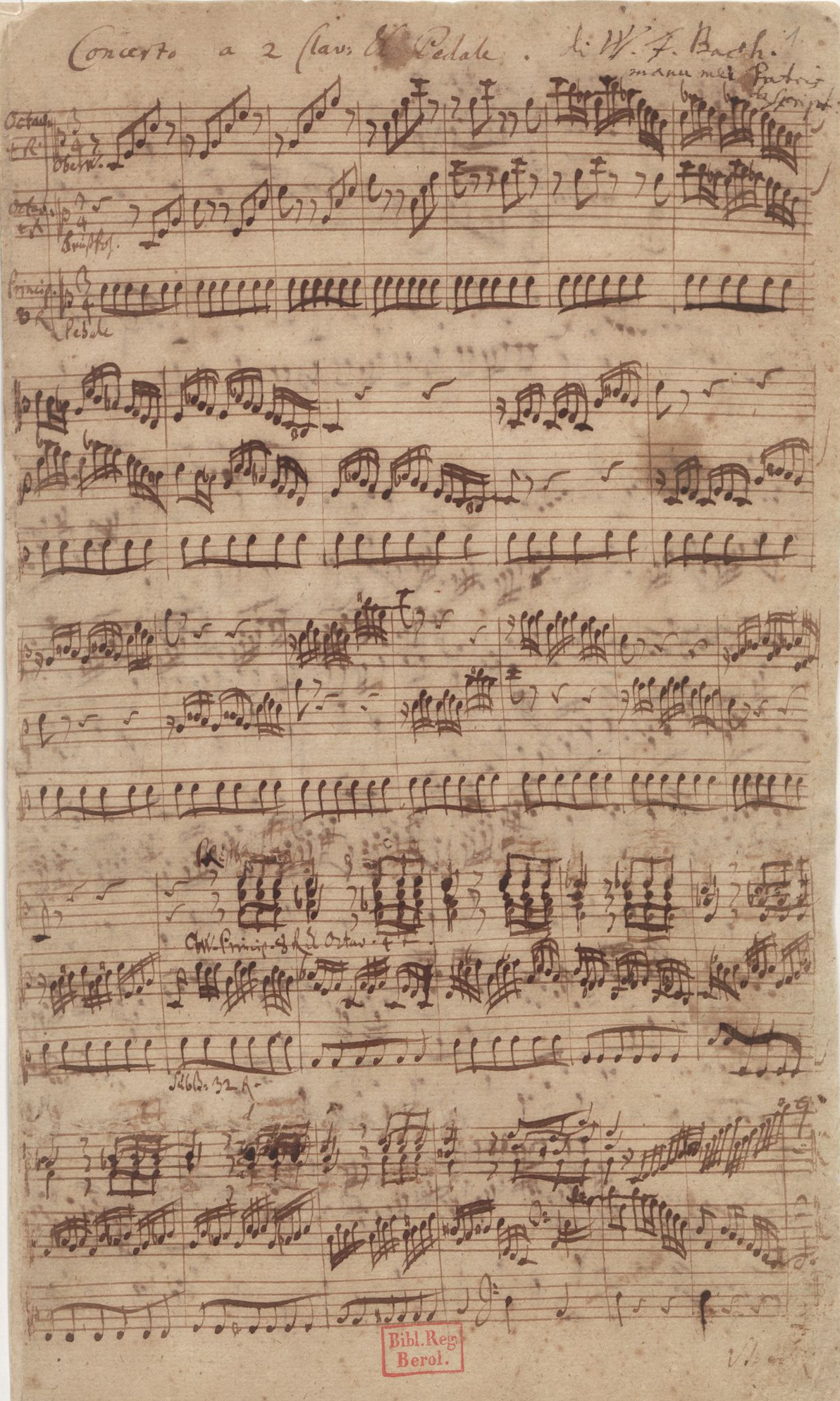
Autograph manuscript of first movement of BWV 596

There are four movements:

Autograph manuscript of third movement and beginning of fourth movement of BWV 596

1. [Allegro]
2. Pieno. Grave – Fuge
3. Largo e spiccato
4. [Allegro]

This transcription of Vivaldi's Concerto in D minor for two violins and obbligato violoncello, Op.3, No.11 (RV 565), had the heading on the autograph manuscript altered by Bach's son Wilhelm Friedemann Bach who added "di W. F. Bach manu mei Patris descript" sixty or more years later. The result was that up until 1911 the transcription was misattributed to Wilhelm Friedemann. Despite the fact that Carl Friedrich Zelter, director of the Sing-Akademie zu Berlin where many Bach manuscripts were held, had suggested Johann Sebastian as the author, the transcription was first published as a work by Wilhelm Friedemann in 1844 in the edition prepared for C.F. Peters by Friedrich Griepenkerl. The precise dating and true authorship was later established from the manuscript: the handwriting and the watermarks in the manuscript paper conform to cantatas known to have been composed by Bach in Weimar in 1714–1715.

The autograph manuscript is remarkable for its detailed specifications of organ registration and use of the two manuals. As explained in Williams (2003), their main purpose was to enable the concerto to be heard at Bach's desired pitch. The markings are also significant for what they show about performance practise at that time: during the course of a single piece, hands could switch manuals and organ stops could be changed.

First movement. From the outset in the original piece, Vivaldi creates an unusual texture: the two violins play as a duet and then are answered by a similar duet for obbligato cello and continuo bass. On the organ Bach creates his own musical texture by exchanging the solo parts between hands and having the responding duet on a second manual. For Williams (2003), Bach's redistribution of the constantly repeated quavers in the original is "no substitute for the lost rhetoric of the strings."

Second movement. The dense chordal writing in the three introductory bars of the Grave is unusual and departs from Vivaldi's specification of "Adagio e spiccato". Bach adapted the fugue to the organ as follows: the pedal does not play the bass line of the original allegro but has an accompanying role, rather than being a separate voice in the fugue; the writing does not distinguish between soloists and ripieno; parts are frequently redistributed; and extra semiquaver figures are introduced, particularly over the prolonged pedal point concluding the piece. The resulting fugue is smoother than the original, which is distinguished by its clearly delineated sections. Williams (2003) remarks that the way Vivaldi inverts the fugue subject must have appealed to Bach.

Third movement. The scoring for organ in the ritornello and solo episodes of this movement—a form of Siciliano—is unusual in Bach's writing for organ. The widely spaced chords that accompany the solo melody in the original are replaced by simple chords in the left hand. For Griepenkerl, the sweetness of the melody reflected the tender personality of Wilhelm Friedemann.

Fourth movement. The last movement of Op.3, No.11 is composed in ritornello A–B–A form. In the opening bars the first and second violins play in tutti the opening theme with its repeated quavers and clashing dissonances. Bach used the same theme for the opening chorus of his cantata Ich hatte viel Bekümmernis, BWV 21, first performed on 17 June 1714, shortly before ill health forced Prince Johann Ernst to leave Weimar for treatment in Bad Schwalbach.

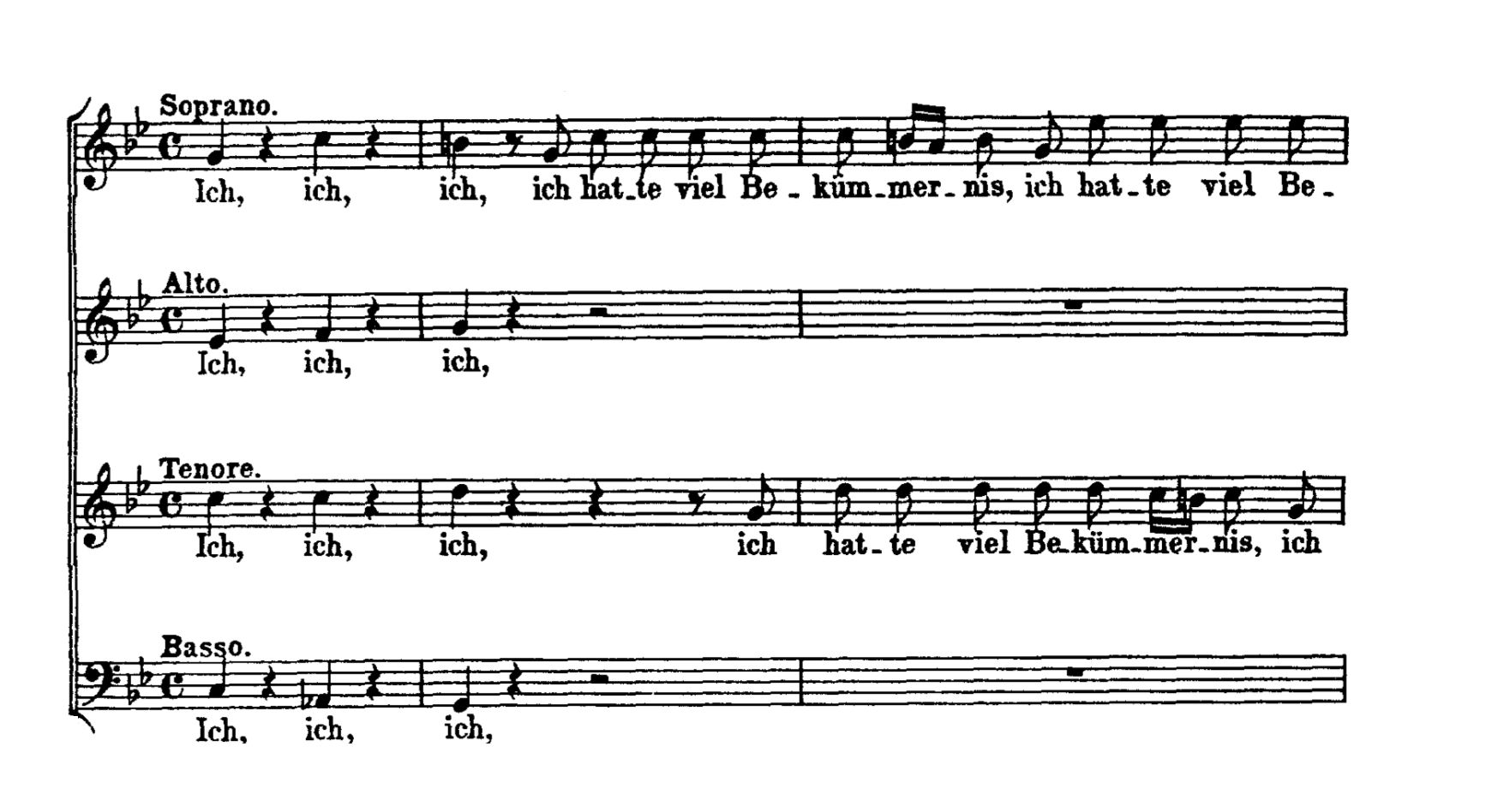

Although each return of the theme with its chromatic falling bass accompaniment is instantly recognizable, Bach's allotting of parts between the two manuals (Oberwerk and Rückpositiv) can occasionally obscure Vivaldi's sharp distinction between solo and ripieno players. Various elements of Vivaldi's string writing, that would normally be outside Bach's musical vocabulary for organ compositions, are included directly or with slight adaptations in Bach's arrangement. As well as the dissonant suspensions in the opening quaver figures, these include quaver figures in parallel thirds, descending chromatic fourths, and rippling demisemiquavers and semiquavers in the left hand as an equivalent for the tremolo string accompaniment. Towards the end of the piece, Bach fills out the accompaniment in the final virtuosic semiquaver solo episode by adding imitative quaver figures in the lower parts. Williams (2003) compares the dramatic ending—with its chromatic fourths descending in the pedal part—to that of the keyboard Sinfonia in D minor, BWV 790.

== Concerto in E♭ major, BWV 597 ==
Probably neither composed nor transcribed by Bach, and rather a trio sonata, by a composer of a later generation, than a concerto. There are two movements:

1. [without tempo indication]
2. Gigue

== Discography ==
=== BWV 592–597 ===
- Hans Fagius (2000). Bach Edition, Boxes 6 (CDs 41 and 45) and 22 (CDs 151–153 and 155). Recorded 1985–1986 and 1988–1989. Brilliant Classics 99365/3, /7; 99381/4, /5, /6, /8.
- Karl Richter (1974). Die Orgelkonzerte, Archiv Production 431119-2 digitally remastered from Polydor International.

=== Orchestral organ concertos ===
- André Isoir and Le Parlement de Musique conducted by Martin Gester (1993). L'œuvre pour orgue et orchestre. Includes BWV 29/1 and reconstructions BWV 1052a, 1053a and 1059a. Calliope CAL 9720.
- Bart Jacobs and Les Muffatti (2019). Concertos for Organ and Strings. Includes Concerto in D major after BWV 169 and BWV 49, Concerto in D minor after BWV 146, BDW 188 and BWV 1052, Sinfonia in G major after BWV 156, Sinfonia in F major after BWV 75, Sinfonia in D major after BWV 29 and BWV 120a, Concerto in D moner after BWV 35 and BWV 1055, Concerto in G minor after BWV 1041 and BWV 1058. Ramée (Outhere Music) RAM 1804.

== Sources ==
- Bach, J.S. (2010), Dirksen, Pieter (ed.), Sonatas, Trios, Concertos, Complete Organ Works (Breitkopf Urtext), vol. 5 EB 8805, Wiesbaden: Breitkopf & Härtel, ISMN 979-0-004-18366-3 Introduction (in German and English) • Commentary (English translation—commentary in paperback original is in German)
- Butler, Gregory (2016), "The Choir Loft as Chamber: Concerted Movements by Bach from the Mid- to Late 1720s", in Matthew Dirst (ed.), Bach Perspectives, Volume 10, Bach and the Organ, University of Illinois Press, pp. 76–86, ISBN 9780252040191
- Rampe, Siegbert (2014), "Hat Bach Konzerte für Orgel und Orchester komponiert?" (PDF), Musik & Gottesdienst (in German), 68: 14–22, archived from the original (PDF) on 2016-11-27
- Williams, Peter (2003), The Organ Music of J. S. Bach (2nd ed.), Cambridge University Press, pp. 201–224, ISBN 0-521-89115-9
- Williams, Peter (2016), Bach: A Musical Biography, Cambridge University Press, ISBN 978-1107139251
- Wolff, Christoph (2008), "Sicilianos and Organ Recitals: Observations on J.S. Bach's concertos", in Gregory Butler (ed.), J. S. Bach's Concerted Ensemble Music: The Concerto, Bach Perspectives, vol. 7, University of Illinois Press, pp. 97–114, ISBN 978-0252031656
- Wolff, Christoph (2016), "Did Bach write organ concertos? A propos the prehistory of cantata movements with obbligato organ", in Dirst, Matthew (ed.), Bach and the Organ, Bach Perspectives, vol. 10, University of Illinois Press, pp. 60–75, ISBN 9780252040191, JSTOR 10.5406/j.ctt18j8xkb
