= Oboe Concerto (Marcello) =

18th-century musical work by Alessandro Marcello

The Oboe Concerto in D minor, S D935, is an early 18th-century concerto for oboe, strings and continuo attributed to the Venetian composer Alessandro Marcello. The earliest extant manuscript containing Johann Sebastian Bach's solo keyboard arrangement of the concerto, BWV 974, dates from around 1715. As a concerto for oboe, strings and continuo group, its oldest extant sources date from 1717: that year it was printed in Amsterdam, and a C minor variant of the concerto, S Z799, was written down.

In the 19th century, Bach's keyboard version was published falsely attributing the concerto to Antonio Vivaldi. In 1923 the C minor version of the oboe concerto was published falsely attributing the concerto to Benedetto Marcello, Alessandro's brother. In the second half of the 20th century several publications indicated Alessandro again as the composer of the piece, as it had been in its early 18th-century print, and the oboe concerto was again published in its D minor version.

In the 20th and 21st centuries the concerto developed into a well-established repertoire piece, as well as an oboe concerto as performed on keyboard.

== History ==
The Concerto in D minor, S D935, was published by Jeanne Roger in Amsterdam in 1717, as a Concerto a Cinque (concerto in five parts) for oboe (soloist), strings (two violin and one viola parts) and continuo composed by Alessandro Marcello. No publication date appears in the print: although the year of publication is, depending on author, sometimes given as "ca. 1714-1717" or "c.1716" it can be inferred from the consecutive testaments of the publisher's father (Estienne Roger) and from the sequence of publication numbers. The publication presents the melody lines unadorned, that is: it is left to the performing musician to embellish melodies with ornaments such as trills, mordents and grace notes. Alessandro Marcello published most of his works under a pseudonym (Eterio Stinfalico): the oboe concerto publication was an exception in that sense as it used his real name.

In his Weimar period (1708–17) Johann Sebastian Bach arranged several concertos by Venetian composers, most of them by Antonio Vivaldi, for solo keyboard, known as his Weimar concerto transcriptions. In July 1713 Prince Johann Ernst returned to Weimar from the Netherlands with several compositions by Italian masters. Vivaldi's Op. 3, L'estro Armonico had been published in Amsterdam in 1711, and there is little doubt that the Prince brought this edition, containing twelve concertos, to Weimar in 1713, as Bach apparently used this print for five of his solo keyboard arrangements. The Prince, who also composed Italianate concertos, presumably encouraged Bach to produce solo keyboard arrangements of such works. As the Prince left Weimar in July 1714 it is estimated that most of Bach's solo keyboard arrangements of Italian and Italianate concertos originated in the period from July 1713 to July 1714. That is, at least those arrangements that could be performed on a harpsichord without pedalboard, while the Weimar court organ (which would be needed for arrangements including pedals such as BWV 592–597) would have been unavailable for undergoing repairs in this period.

Adagio (2nd movement), BWV 974, Bach's transcription for keyboard
Performed by Constantin Stephan

Bach's manualiter arrangement, BWV 974, of the Marcello concerto was apparently not based on the Amsterdam edition, but must have been based on a (lost) manuscript version of the concerto that circulated before it was printed. The July 1713 to July 1714 timeframe may fit for the production of the arrangement of this concerto, although an earlier or later date is possible too. Bach's autograph of the solo keyboard arrangement is lost, but the arrangement was copied around 1715 by Bach's second cousin Johann Bernhard, as the third item in a manuscript containing 12 of Johann Sebastian's keyboard transcriptions of Italian and Italianate concertos. In 1739 Johann Bernhard's son Johann Ernst wrote a title page for this collection, suggesting that the collection contained Vivaldi arrangements for organ exclusively. He may have intended this title page for the first concerto in the collection only (which was indeed an arrangement of a Vivaldi concerto), but an unknown hand later added the number "XII" before the title, thus causing the misunderstanding that all 12 were Vivaldi arrangements. Another copy of Bach's arrangement indicates "Marcello" (without first name) as the composer of the original work, and J. S. Bach as the arranger. That copy, specifying harpsichord as the intended instrument for the arrangement, originated after Johann Bernhard's, but may have been copied from an earlier stage of Bach's arrangement. Another manuscript containing Bach's arrangement of Marcello's oboe concerto indicated "J. S. B." as composer on the title page, without mentioning an earlier model, or its composer, for the composition.

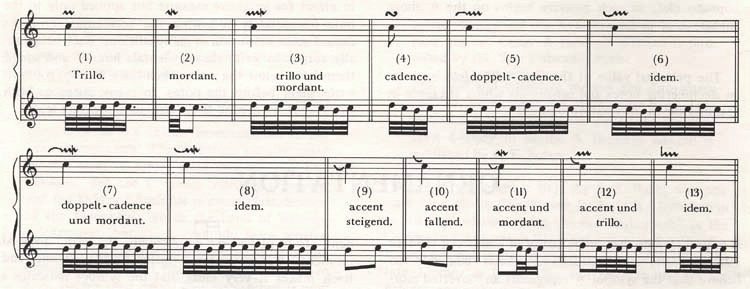
In 1720 Johann Sebastian Bach compiled a short ornament guide for his eldest son Wilhelm Friedemann

The ornamentation as indicated in Bach's keyboard version of the concerto works well on harpsichord, but is less suitable for performance on an early 18th-century oboe. Nonetheless Bach's ornamentation has been used for 20th-century publications of the oboe concerto – the ornamentation causes fewer problems when performed on a modern oboe. Editions of the D minor version of the oboe concerto with an ornamentation which is better in line with the possibilities of a baroque oboe have been proposed since the late 20th century.

Another transcription of the concerto, as concerto a 5 for oboe, strings and continuo in C minor, is found in a 1717 manuscript. The type of errors in this manuscript seems to suggest that the transposition from D minor to C minor may have been produced by its scribes while copying. This manuscript writes the composer's name as "Marcello" without specifying a first name: as Alessandro's brother Benedetto was far better known as a composer by the name Marcello, later generations would interpret the title of the manuscript as referring to the better known of the "Marcello" composers.

== Movements ==
The piece has three movements:

1. Andante e spiccato
2. Adagio
3. Presto

The concerto survives in different printed and manuscript versions, one of these in C minor.

== Other versions ==
The concerto has also been recorded played on a piccolo trumpet - a notoriously challenging transcription due to the breath control and tight embouchure required for its sustained passages in the higher register.

Bach's keyboard transcription of the 2nd movement ("Adagio") was adapted by John Williams for inclusion in his score for Steven Spielberg's 2022 semi-autobiographical film The Fabelmans, heard during the entire three-minute sequence where Sammy Fabelman edits the footage he took of a family camping trip and uncovers the affair between his mother Mitzi and Bennie Lowey, his father Burt's loyal co-worker. The scene is intercut with Mitzi herself playing the piece on her piano while Burt sits on the couch, listening to it.

== Sources ==
Manuscripts

- D-B Mus. ms. Bach P 280 (3) at Berlin State Library: "Concerto III ex D-♭", pp. 12–16, c.1715, in XII. CONCERTO | di | VIVALDI. | elabor: | di | J. S. Bach. ("Concerto in d (BWV 974)" in Bach Digital Source 00001222; RISM 467300720)
- SW Mus. Ms. 3530 at Landesbibliothek Mecklenburg-Vorpommern Günther Uecker, Musikaliensammlung (D-SWl): Concerto a 5: | Hautbois | Violino: Primo | Violino: Secundo | Viola: | et | Basso Continuo | dÿ | Marcello:, 1717 (S Z799; RISM 240003100)
- D-B Mus. ms. Bach P 804, Fascicle 4 at Berlin State Library, after 1727 ("Concerto in D♭. di J. S. B.", BWV 974, copied by Johann Peter Kellner and others; Bach Digital Source 00001801)
- D-DS Mus. ms. 66 at Universitäts- und Landesbibliothek Darmstadt, c.1720–39 (BWV 974; Source 00002746 and first page at Bach Digital website)

Score publications

- "Concerto II: del Sig. Alexandro Marcello" in Concerti a Cinque: Con Violini, Oboè, Violetta, Violoncello e Basso Continuo, Del Signori G. Valentini, A. Vivaldi, T. Albinoni, F. M. Veracini, G. St. Martin, A. Marcello, G. Rampin, A. Predieri. – Volume I. Amsterdam: Jeanne Roger (Catalogue No. 432), [1717] (S D935)
- Ernst Naumann (editor). Concerto III (pp. 73–79) of "VIII: XVI Concerte nach A. Vivaldi" in Volume 42: Clavierwerke, Band 5 of the Bach-Gesellschaft Ausgabe. Leipzig: Breitkopf und Härtel, 1894. Plate B.W. XLII.
- Richard Lauschmann (editor). Benedetto Marcello: Concerto für Oboe in c-Moll mit Begleitung von zwei Violinen, Viola, Basso und Cembalo (oder Pianoforte). Leipzig: Forberg, 1923
- Hugo Ruf (editor). Konzert d-moll für Oboe (Violine), Streicher und Basso continuo: Cembalo (Orgel), Violoncello (Viola da gamba) ad lib. Schott, 1963.
- Bernard Howard Gilmore (editor). Alessandro Marcello's Concerto in D minor, for oboe, strings, and continuo: A practical edition and discussion, No. 1 Department of Music, 1965.
- Himie Voxman (editor); Richard Hervig (continuo realization / piano reduction). Alessandro Marcello: Concerto in D minor (C minor) for Oboe & Strings (with Bach's Ornaments). London: Musica Rara, 1977
- Manfred Fechner (editor). Alessandro Marcello: Konzert d-Moll für Oboe, Streicher und Basso continuo. Leipzig: Peters, 1977.
- Karl Heller (editor). "Concerto d-moll BWV 974 nach dem Oboenkonzert von Marcello" in Johann Sebastian Bach: Neue Ausgabe sämtlicher Werke, Series V: Keyboard and Lute Works, Volume 11: Arrangements of Works from other Composers. Bärenreiter, 1997.

Writings

- Richard D. P. Jones. "Concerto Transcriptions" pp. 142–153 in The Creative Development of Johann Sebastian Bach, Volume I: 1695–1717 – Music to Delight the Spirit. Oxford University Press, 2006. ISBN 9780191513244
- Rudolf Rasch. "De dochters van Estienne Roger", pp. 65–78 in Jaarboek voor Nederlandse boekgeschiedenis, Vol. 12. Nijmegen: Vantilt, 2005.
- David Schulenberg. "8: The Concerto Transcriptions", pp. 117–139 in The Keyboard Music of J.S. Bach. Routledge, ^{2}2013. ISBN 9781136091469
- Eleanor Selfridge-Field. The Music of Benedetto and Alessandro Marcello: A Thematic Catalogue with Commentary on the Composers, Repertory, and Sources. Oxford University Press/Clarendon Press, 1990. ISBN 9780193161269
- Rebecca Kemper Scarnati. The Ornamentation of Four Early Eighteenth-century Italian Oboe Concerti Found in "Concerti a Cinque... Libro primo" of Jeanne Roger (Amsterdam, ca. 1714-1717). University of Arizona, 1996 (Ph.D. thesis).
