= Johann Gottfried Walther =

German music theorist and musician (1684–1748)

- Born: September 18, 1684
- Died: March 23, 1748 (aged 63)
- Era: Baroque
- Relatives: Bach family

Johann Gottfried Walther (18 September 1684 – 23 March 1748) was a German music theorist, organist, composer, and lexicographer of the Baroque era.

== Life and work ==
Concerto in B flat major I. Adagio for organ
Concerto in B flat major after Giulio Taglietti - 1st mvt. Adagio. Played by Tibor Pinter. Recorded on the Silbermann organ sample set (1722). Rötha, Germany

Concerto in B flat major II. Allegro for organ
Concerto in B flat major after Giulio Taglietti - 2nd mvt. Allegro. Played by Tibor Pinter. Recorded on the Silbermann organ sample set (1722). Rötha, Germany

Concerto in B flat major III. Adagio. for organ
Concerto in B flat major after Giulio Taglietti - 3rd mvt. Adagio. Played by Tibor Pinter. Recorded on the Silbermann organ sample set (1722). Rötha, Germany

Alle Menschen müssen sterben - choral prelude for organ
Played by Tibor Pinter. Recorded on the Silbermann organ sample set (1722). Rötha, Germany

Ach, Gott, erhör mein Seufzen und Wehklage - choral prelude for organ
Played by Tibor Pinter. Recorded on the Silbermann organ sample set (1722). Rötha, Germany

Das alte Jahr vergangen ist - choral prelude for organ
Played by Tibor Pinter. Recorded on the Silbermann organ sample set (1722). Rötha, Germany

Wer nur den lieben Gott lässt walten
Chorale prelude for organ, performed on the Rieger organ of the Münster Dinkelsbühl by Ulrich Metzner

Wer nur den lieben Gott lässt walten: Choralvers pedaliter
Chorale prelude for organ, performed on the Rieger organ of the Münster Dinkelsbühl by Ulrich Metzner

Walther was born at Erfurt, Electorate of Mainz and cousin of Johann Sebastian Bach.

Walther was most well known as the compiler of the Musicalisches Lexicon (Leipzig, 1732), an enormous dictionary of music and musicians. Not only was it the first dictionary of musical terms written in the German language, it was the first to contain both terms and biographical information about composers and performers up to the early 18th century. In all, the Musicalisches Lexicon defines more than 3,000 musical terms; Walther evidently drew on more than 250 separate sources in compiling it, including theoretical treatises of the early Baroque and Renaissance. The single most important source for the work was the writings of Johann Mattheson, who is referenced more than 200 times.

Some further information on Walther can be found in the book Musica Poetica by Dietrich Bartel. On page 22, Bartel quotes Walther's definition of musica poetica, or musical rhetoric, as:

"Musica Poetica or musical composition is a mathematical science through which an agreeable and correct harmony of the notes is brought to paper in order that it might later be sung or played, thereby appropriately moving the listeners to Godly devotion as well as to please and delight both mind and soul.... It is so called because the composer must not only understand language as does the poet in order not to violate the meter of the text but because he also writes poetry, namely a melody, thus deserving the title Melopoeta or Melopoeus." (22)

Walther was the music teacher of Prince Johann Ernst von Sachsen-Weimar. He wrote a handbook for the young prince with the title Praecepta der musicalischen Composition, 1708. It remained handwritten until Peter Benary's edition (Leipzig, 1955). As an organ composer, Walther became famous for his organ transcriptions of orchestral concertos by contemporary Italian and German masters. He made 14 transcriptions of concertos by Albinoni, Gentili, Taglietti, Giuseppe Torelli, Vivaldi and Telemann. These works were the models for Bach to write his famous transcriptions of concertos by Vivaldi and others. On the other hand, Walther as a city organist of Weimar wrote exactly 132 organ preludes based on Lutheran chorale melodies. Some free keyboard music also belongs to his legacy.

== Selected recordings ==
- Johann Gottfried Walther: Complete Organ Music (2015). Simone Stella (organ). 12 cd box Brilliant Classics BC 94730
