= Alessandro Marcello =

Italian composer (1673–1747)

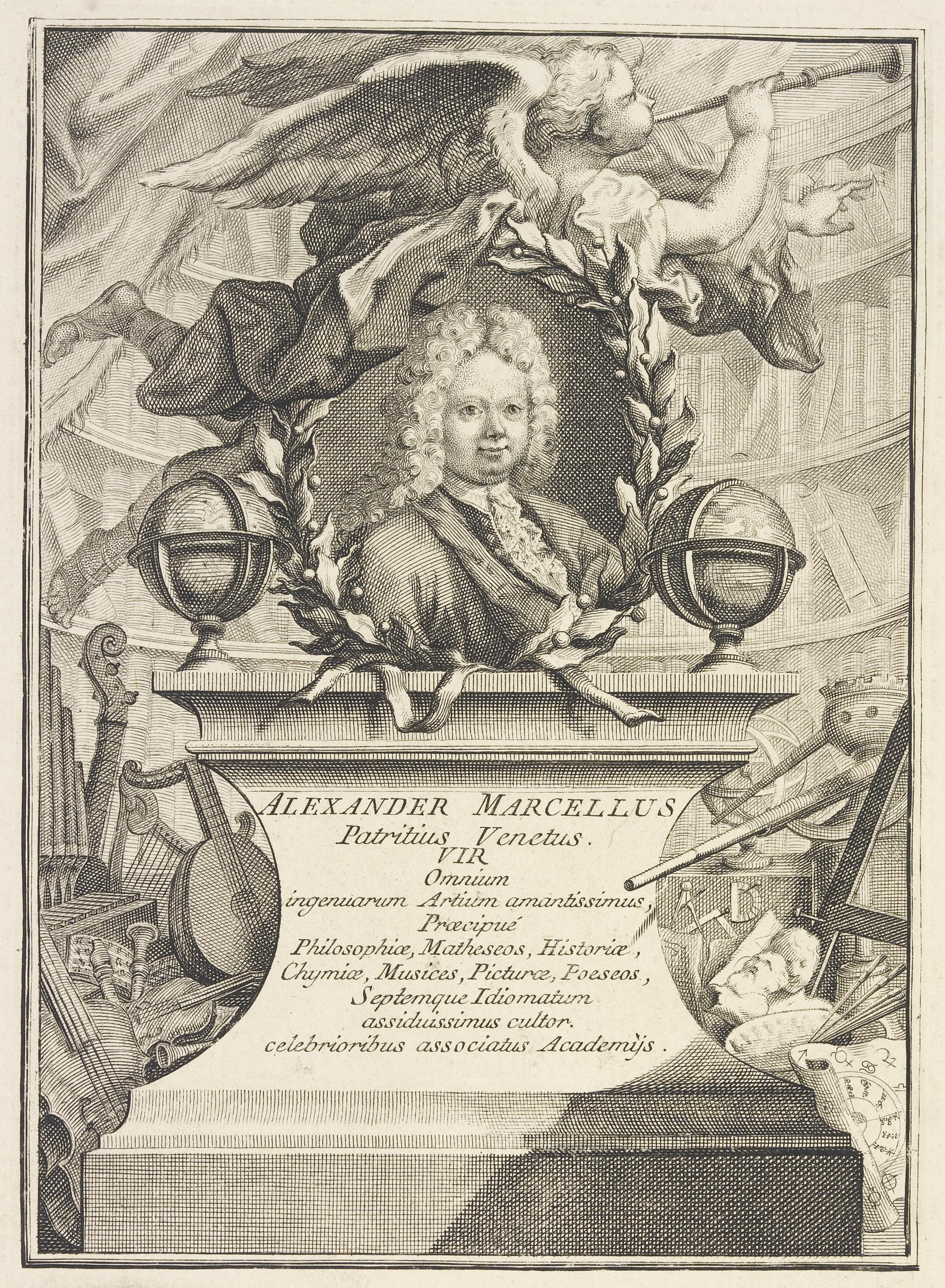
- 18th-century engraved portrait of Alexander Marcellus
- Born: 1 February 1673; Venice
- Died: 19 June 1747 (aged 74); Venice
- Occupation: Composer
- Known for: Oboe Concerto in D minor

Alessandro Ignazio Marcello (Italian: [marˈtʃɛllo]; 1 February 1673 – 19 June 1747) was an Italian nobleman and composer.

== Biography ==
Born in Venice, Marcello was the son of a senator, and as a member of the noble Marcello family, enjoyed a comfortable life that gave him the freedom to pursue his interest in music. He held concerts in his hometown and composed and published several sets of concertos, including six under the title of La Cetra (The Lyre), as well as cantatas, arias, canzonetti, and violin sonatas.

A contemporary of Tomaso Albinoni, and a slightly older contemporary of Antonio Vivaldi, Marcello often composed under the pseudonym Eterio Stinfalico, his name as a member of the celebrated Arcadian Academy (Pontificia Accademia degli Arcadi). Marcello died in Venice in 1747 and was buried on his family's countryside estate in Paviola near Padua.

Rosanna Scalfi, a singer and composer, was the widow of Alessandro's better-known brother Benedetto Marcello. As their 1728 marriage had not been sanctioned by the state due to her being of common birth, she was unable to inherit his estate, and in 1742 filed suit against Alessandro seeking financial support.

== Works ==
Although most of Marcello's works are infrequently performed today, Marcello is regarded as a highly competent composer. His La Cetra concertos are "unusual for their wind solo parts, concision and use of counterpoint within a broadly Vivaldian style", according to Grove, "placing them as a last outpost of the classic Venetian Baroque concerto".

The Concerto for Oboe and Strings in D minor op. 1 is perhaps his best-known work. Its worth was affirmed by Johann Sebastian Bach, who transcribed it for harpsichord (BWV 974). A number of editions have been published, including an edition in C minor to accommodate the baroque oboe, which was played a whole tone lower than the modern oboe.

== Sources ==
- The Grove Concise Dictionary of Music, Oxford University Press, 1994.
