= Prince Johann Ernst of Saxe-Weimar =

Composer

Prince Johann Ernst
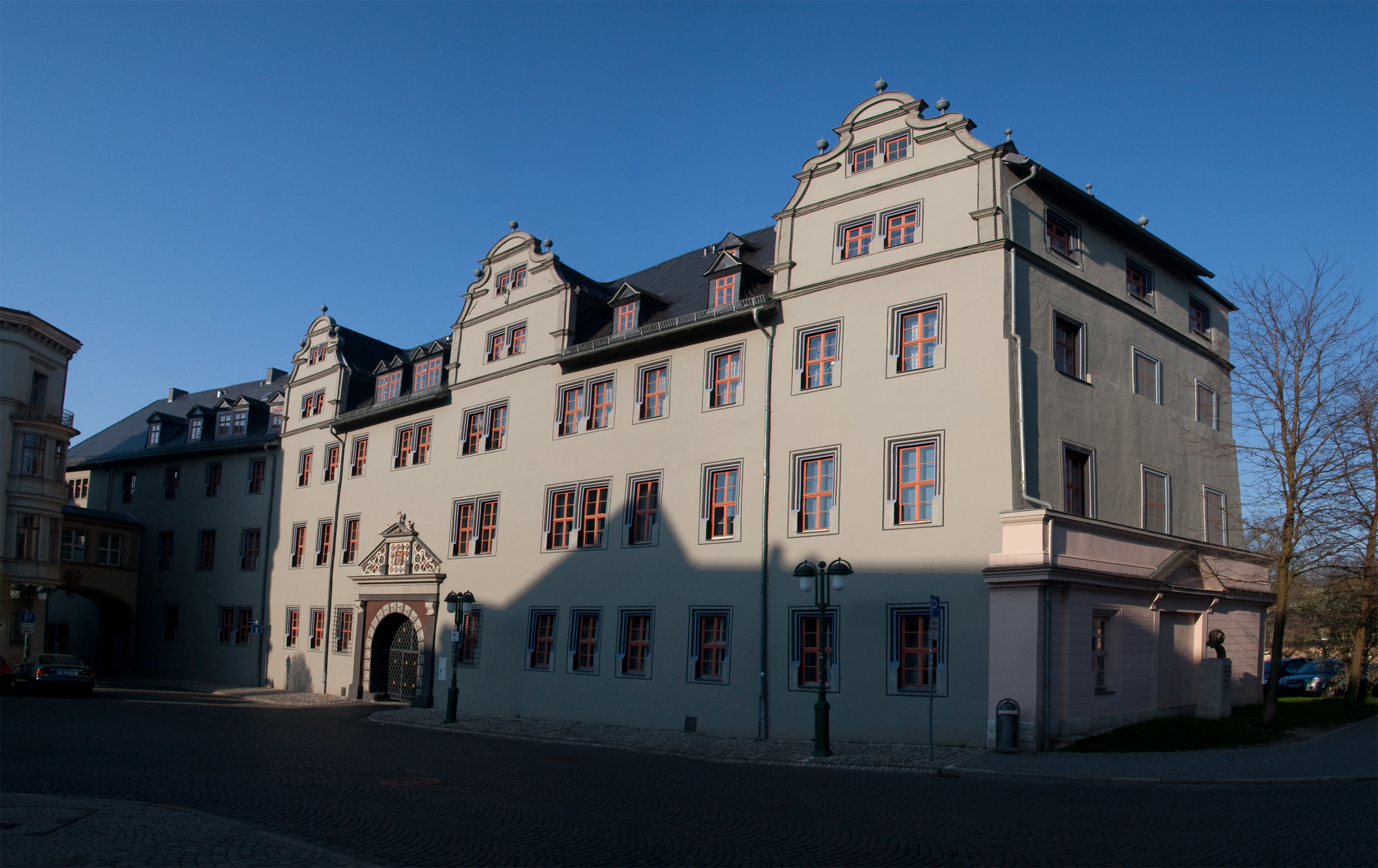
- The Red Castle in Weimar where Johann Ernst lived with his brother Duke Ernst August I
- Born: 25 December 1696; Weimar
- Died: 1 August 1715 (aged 18); Frankfurt
- House: House of Wettin
- Father: Johann Ernst III, Duke of Saxe-Weimar
- Mother: Charlotte Dorothea Sophia of Hesse-Homburg

Johann Ernst of Saxe-Weimar (German: Johann Ernst von Sachsen-Weimar) (25 December 1696 – 1 August 1715) was a German prince, son by his second marriage of Johann Ernst III, Duke of Saxe-Weimar. Despite his early death he is remembered as a collector and commissioner of music and as a composer, some of whose concertos were arranged for harpsichord or organ by Johann Sebastian Bach, who was court organist in Weimar at the time.

== Life ==
Johann Ernst was born in Weimar, the fourth son and sixth child of Johann Ernst III, Duke of Saxe-Weimar, and second child of the Duke's second wife, Charlotte Dorothea Sophia of Hesse-Homburg. As a young child the prince took violin lessons from G.C. Eilenstein, who was a court musician.

He studied at the University of Utrecht between February 1711 and July 1713. It is thought that Johann Ernst furthered his understanding of music at this time. From Utrecht, he could visit such centres as Amsterdam and Düsseldorf and it is known that he had copies of Italian music sent back to Weimar. (Household bills for the year from 1 June following his return record the cost of copying, binding and shelving music.) In particular, it is thought that he might have encountered Vivaldi's opus 3 set of violin concertos. The prince's interest in collecting music was sufficiently well known that P. D. Kräuter, when requesting leave of absence to study with Bach in Weimar, mentioned the French and Italian music that the prince was expected to introduce there. Kräuter also praised Johann Ernst's virtuosity as a violinist.

On his return from university, Johann Ernst took lessons in composition with a focus on concertos from the local church organist Johann Gottfried Walther, a cousin of Bach. Walther had previously given the prince keyboard lessons and had given him his Praecepta der musicalischen Composition (Precepts of Musical Composition) as a twelfth birthday present.

During his life, Walther transcribed seventy-eight concertos for keyboard. Bach also produced a number of virtuoso organ (BWV 592–6) and harpsichord (BWV 972–987) arrangements. These included some of the prince's own works (BWV 592, 592a, 595, 982, 984 and 987) as well as works by German and Italian composers, including Georg Philipp Telemann (BWV 985) and Vivaldi (BWV 972, 973 etc.). The Bach transcriptions were created roughly during the period July 1713–July 1714 between Johann Ernst's return from Utrecht and the prince's final departure from Weimar. There is some scholarly debate on Johann Ernst's role in the creation of these arrangements, whether he commissioned some from one or both of the musicians or whether Bach, in particular, was studying some of the works collected by the prince for their own sake. There are suggestions that on a visit to Amsterdam in February 1713 the Prince may have heard the blind organist J. J. de Graff, who is known to have played keyboard arrangements of other composers' concertos. In any case, Bach's encounter with the prince's collection, and especially the Italian music it contained, had a profound influence on the development of the composer's musical style.

As well as influencing Bach, Johann Ernst completed at least nineteen instrumental works of his own before his death at age eighteen. These works show the influence of Italian music more than that of German models such as Bach.

Johann Ernst died in Frankfurt after a long illness resulting from a leg infection, possibly a metastatic sarcoma, which, despite the intensive care of his heart-broken mother and medical treatments in Schwalbach, spread to the abdominal area. He was buried, not in Weimar, but in Homburg (Bad Homburg vor der Höhe) in the vault of his mother's family, the Landgraves of Hesse-Homburg. A period of mourning was declared in Weimar from 11 August to 9 November 1715. Music was banned, including in church, resulting in an interruption in Bach's attempt to build an annual cycle of cantatas.

Following his death, six of the prince's concertos were sent to Telemann, who edited and published them in 1718. He himself had already started to have them set before his death. Telemann's own first publication, a 1715 set of six violin sonatas, had been dedicated to Johann Ernst.

== Compositions ==
According to Walther's Lexicon, published in 1732, Johann Ernst composed 19 instrumental pieces in a period of nine months, shortly before his death, when Walther was teaching him composition. Eight violin concertos are extant in their original instrumentation. Bach transcribed three of these: Op. 1 Nos. 1 and 4 and the Concerto a 8 in G major. Another concerto by Johann Ernst is only known through Bach's transcriptions in C major. No original has been identified for BWV 983: it was possibly transcribed by Bach from a concerto by Johann Ernst. The model for BWV 977 is equally lost: also in this case a possible attribution of the lost original to Johann Ernst is uncertain.

=== Violin Concerto Op. 1 No. 1 in B-flat major ===
Violin Concerto in B-flat major, Op. 1 No. 1, for violino principale and strings (violin I & II, viola, harpsichord):

1. Allegro
2. Adagio – Allegro
3. Un Poco Presto
- Printed editions: Telemann 1718; Bergmann 2013 (Vol. 1)
- Recordings: l'Oiseau-Lyre 1989; Thorofon 1997; cpo 2015

Adaptations:

- Concerto in B-flat major for unaccompanied harpsichord, BWV 982, transcribed by Johann Sebastian Bach
  - Manuscripts: D-B Mus. ms. Bach P 280
  - Printed editions: Naumann 1894 (p. 135)
  - Recordings: Thorofon 1997; cpo 2015

=== Violin Concerto Op. 1 No. 2 in A minor ===
Violin Concerto in A minor, Op. 1 No. 2, for violino principale and strings (violin I & II, viola, harpsichord or cello):

1. Allegro
2. Largo
3. Andante
- Printed editions: Telemann 1718; Hortschansky 2001; Bergmann 2013 (Vol. 1)
- Recordings: cpo 2015

=== Violin Concerto Op. 1 No. 3 in E minor ===
Violin Concerto in E minor, Op. 1 No. 3, for violino principale and strings (violin I & II, viola, harpsichord or cello):

1. Vivace
2. Pastorella
3. Presto
- Printed editions: Telemann 1718; Bergmann 2013 (Vol. 1)
- Recordings: cpo 2015

=== Violin Concerto Op. 1 No. 4 in D minor ===
Violin Concerto in D minor, Op. 1 No. 4, for violino principale and strings (violin I & II, viola, harpsichord or cello):

1. Adagio – Presto – Adagio – Presto – Adagio
2. Allegro
3. Adagio – Vivace
- Printed editions: Telemann 1718; Bergmann 2013 (Vol. 2)
- Recordings: cpo 2015

Adaptations:

- Concerto in D minor for unaccompanied harpsichord, BWV 987, transcribed by Johann Sebastian Bach
  - Manuscripts: D-B Mus. ms. Bach P 804 (Fascicle 34)
  - Printed editions: Naumann 1894 (p. 165)
  - Recordings: cpo 2015

=== Violin Concerto Op. 1 No. 5 in E major ===
Violin Concerto in E major, Op. 1 No. 5, for violino principale and strings (violin I & II, viola, harpsichord or cello):

1. [without tempo indication]
2. Siciliana
3. Allegro
- Printed editions: Telemann 1718; Bergmann 2013 (Vol. 2)
- Recordings: cpo 2015

=== Violin Concerto Op. 1 No. 6 in G minor ===
Violin Concerto in G minor, Op. 1 No. 6, for violino principale and strings (violin I & II, viola, harpsichord or cello):

1. Vivace
2. Recitativo
3. Allegro
- Printed editions: Telemann 1718; Bergmann 2013 (Vol. 2)
- Recordings: cpo 2015

=== Violin Concerto a 8 in G major ===
Violin Concerto in G major for violino principale, violin I & II obligato, violin I & II ripieno, viola, cello and harpsichord:

1. Allegro assai
2. Adagio
3. Presto e staccato
- Manuscripts: D-ROu Mus.Saec.XVIII:66|3|9; D-WRz Mus IVf:19
- Printed editions: Hérengt & Kimura 2016
- Recordings: Thorofon 1997; cpo 2015

Adaptations:

- Organ Concerto in G major, BWV 592, transcribed by Johann Sebastian Bach
  - Manuscripts: D-B Mus. ms. Bach P 280; D-B Mus. ms. Bach P 400a; D-B Mus. ms. Bach P 804 (Fascicle 31); D-LEb Peters Ms. 11
  - Printed editions: Naumann 1891 (p. 149)
  - Recordings: Thorofon 1997
- Concerto in G major for unaccompanied harpsichord, BWV 592a, transcribed by Johann Sebastian Bach
  - Manuscripts: D-LEm Poel. mus. Ms. 29
  - Printed editions: Naumann 1894 (p. 282)
  - Recordings: cpo 2015

=== Violin Concerto a 6 in G major ===
Violin Concerto in G major for violino principale, violin I & II, viola, bass and continuo, a.k.a. RV Anh. 12:

1. Adagio
2. Allegro
3. Adagio
4. Allegro
- Manuscripts: D-ROu Mus.Saec.XVIII:61|7|b
- Printed editions: Hérengt & Kimura 2016
- Recordings: cpo 2015

=== Original of Concerto in C major, BWV 984 and 595 ===
Instrumentation and key of the model for BWV 984 and 595 are unknown.

Adaptations:

- Concerto in C major for unaccompanied harpsichord, BWV 984, transcribed by Johann Sebastian Bach:
  1. [no tempo indication]
  2. Adagio e affettoso
  3. Allegro assai
  - Manuscripts: D-B Mus. ms. Bach P 804 (Fascicle 52); D-LEb Peters Ms. 8 (Fascicle 28); D-LEm Poel. mus. Ms. 29
  - Printed editions: Naumann 1894 (p. 148)
- Organ Concerto in C major, BWV 595, transcribed by Johann Sebastian Bach:
  1. [no tempo indication] (first movement only)
  - Manuscripts: D-B Mus. ms. Bach P 286
  - Printed editions: Naumann 1891 (p. 196)
- Concerto in C major for 2 Violins (reconstructed from BWV 595 and 984)
  - Recordings: Haenssler 2007

=== Trumpet Sonata in D major ===
Sonata in D major for trumpet, two violins and continuo (attribution uncertain):

1. Vivace
2. Largo
3. Allegro
4. Adagio
5. Menuet
- Recordings: Edel 1998; Kamprad 1999

== Manuscripts ==
- D-B Mus. ms. Bach P 280 at Berlin State Library (BWV 592 and 973–982; RISM 467300717; D-B Mus. ms. Bach P 280 at Bach Digital website)
- D-B Mus. ms. Bach P 286 at Berlin State Library (RISM 467300057): Fascicle 6 (BWV 595) at Bach Digital website
- D-B Mus. ms. Bach P 400a at Berlin State Library (BWV 592; RISM 467300035; D-B Mus. ms. Bach P 400a at Bach Digital website)
- D-B Mus. ms. Bach P 804 at Berlin State Library (RISM 467300254): Fascicles 31 (BWV 592), 34 (BWV 987), 35 (BWV 983), 52 (BWV 984) and 56 (BWV 977) at Bach Digital website
- D-LEb Peters Ms. 8 at Stadtbibliothek Leipzig/Bach Archive: Fascicle 28 (BWV 984) at Bach Digital website
- D-LEb Peters Ms. 11 at Stadtbibliothek Leipzig/Bach Archive: (BWV 592; D-LEb Peters Ms. 11 at Bach Digital website)
- D-LEm Poel. mus. Ms. 29 at Stadtbibliothek Leipzig (BWV 592a and 983–984; D-LEm Poel. mus. Ms. 29 at Bach Digital website)
- D-ROu Mus.Saec.XVII:51|3|9|a at Rostock university library (Concerto for two violins in B-flat major; RISM 200045535)
- D-ROu Mus.Saec.XVII:51|4|1 at Rostock university library (Violin Concerto in D minor; RISM 200045539)
- D-ROu Mus.Saec.XVII:51|4|2 at Rostock university library (Concerto in A minor; RISM 200045538)
- D-ROu Mus.Saec.XVIII:61|7|a at Rostock university library (Violin Concerto in E minor, RV Anh. 11, attributed to Johann Ernst; RISM 200045537)
- D-ROu Mus.Saec.XVIII:61|7|b at Rostock university library (Violin Concerto a 6 in G major, RV Anh. 12, attributed to Johann Ernst; RISM 200045536)
- D-ROu Mus.Saec.XVIII:66|3|9 at Rostock university library (Violin Concerto a 8 in G major; RISM 200045534)
- D-WRz Mus IVf:19 at Herzogin Anna Amalia Bibliothek (Violin Concerto a 8 in G major; RISM 200045540)

== Printed editions ==
- (Telemann 1718) Georg Philipp Telemann, editor. Six | CONCERTS | à | Un Violon concertant, | deux Violons, une Taille, et | Clavecin ou Basse de Viole, | de feu | SAS Monseigneur le Prince | JEAN ERNESTE | Duc de Saxe-Weimar, | Opera Ima. M. Kloss et M. Sellius, 1718 (RISM 00000990032612)
- (Naumann 1891) Ernst Naumann, editor. Bach-Gesellschaft Ausgabe, Vol. 38: Orgelwerke, Band 3. Breitkopf & Härtel, 1891
- (Naumann 1894) Ernst Naumann, editor. Bach-Gesellschaft Ausgabe, Vol. 42: Clavierwerke, Band 5. Breitkopf & Härtel, 1894
- (Hortschansky 2001) Klaus Hortschansky, editor. Musik in der Residenzstadt Weimar. Leipzig: Hofmeister, 2001
- (Bergmann 2013) Hans Bergmann, editor. Johann Ernst Prinz von Sachsen-Weimar: 6 Violinkonzerte Op. 1, Vol. 1 (Concerto I-III) and Vol. 2 (Concerto IV-VI). Offenburg, 2013
- (Hérengt & Kimura 2016) Hélène Hérengt and Mihoko Kimura, editors. Johann Ernst Prinz von Sachsen-Weimar: Zwei Violinkonzerte. Offenburg, 2016

== Recordings ==
Apart from several performances of the Bach transcriptions, recordings featuring music by Johann Ernst include:

- (l'Oiseau-Lyre 1989) Stanley Ritchie, violin; The Bach Ensemble; Joshua Rifkin, conductor. Violin concertos at the court of Weimar. L'Oiseau-Lyre 421 442-2, 1989
- (Thorofon 1997) Simon Standage, violin; Ludger Rémy, harpsichord; Sebastian Knebel, organ; Weimar Baroque Ensemble. Weimarer Transkriptionen. Thorofon CTH2371-72, 1997
- (Edel 1998) Ludwig Güttler, trumpet; Virtuosi Saxoniae; Friedrich Kircheis, harpsichord. Ludwig Güttler in Weimar. Edel, 1998.
- (Kamprad 1999) Felix Friedrich, Organ; Mathias Schmutzler, Trumpet. Festive concert for trumpet and organ. Altenburg: Klaus-Jürgen Kamprad publishing house, 1999
- (Haenssler 2007) Freiburg Musica Poetica Ensemble; Hans Bergmann, conductor. Cantata, Concerto & Sonata. Haenssler Classic CD98.408, 2007
- (cpo 2015) Anne Schumann, violin; Ensemble "Fürsten-Musik"; Sebastian Knebel, harpsichord. Johann Ernst von Sachsen-Weimar: The Complete Violin Concertos; J. S. Bach: Harpsichord Transcriptions. cpo 777 998-2, 2015

== Ancestors ==
Ancestors of Prince Johann Ernst of Saxe-Weimar

16. John II, Duke of Saxe-Weimar
8. William, Duke of Saxe-Weimar
17. Dorothea Maria of Anhalt
4. John Ernest II, Duke of Saxe-Weimar
18. John George I, Prince of Anhalt-Dessau
9. Eleonore Dorothea of Anhalt-Dessau
19. Countess Palatine Dorothea of Simmern
2. John Ernest III, Duke of Saxe-Weimar
20. Alexander, Duke of Schleswig-Holstein-Sonderburg
10. John Christian, Duke of Schleswig-Holstein-Sonderburg
21. Dorothea of Schwarzburg-Sondershausen
5. Christine Elisabeth of Schleswig-Holstein-Sonderburg
22. Anton II, Count of Oldenburg-Delmenhorst
11. Anna of Oldenburg-Delmenhorst
23. Sibylle Elisabeth of Brunswick-Dannenberg
1. Prince Johann Ernst of Saxe-Weimar
24. George I, Landgrave of Hesse-Darmstadt
12. Frederick I, Landgrave of Hesse-Homburg
25. Magdalene of Lippe
6. Frederick II, Landgrave of Hesse-Homburg
26. Count Christopher of Leiningen-Westerburg
13. Margaret Elisabeth of Leiningen-Westerburg
27. Anna Maria Ungnad, Baroness of Weissenwolff
3. Charlotte Dorothea Sofie of Hesse-Homburg
28. Wilhelm Kettler, Duke of Corland
14. Jacob Kettler, Duke of Corland
29. Duchess Sophie of Prussia
7. Louise Elisabeth of Courland
30. George William, Elector of Brandenburg
15. Margravine Louise Charlotte of Brandenburg
31. Elizabeth Charlotte of the Palatinate

== Sources ==
- Butt, John (ed.). The Cambridge Companion to Bach. Cambridge Companions to Music. Cambridge University Press. (digitised)
- Ersch, J.S., 1842, in: Allgemeine Encyclopädie der Wissenschaften und Künste, Leipzig 1842, II./21., p. 260 (digitised) (in German)
- Williams, Peter F., 1980: The Organ Music of J.S. Bach I: BWV 525-598, 802-805 etc., pp. 283–5. Cambridge University Press (digitised)
