= Twelve Concertos, Op. 7 (Vivaldi) =

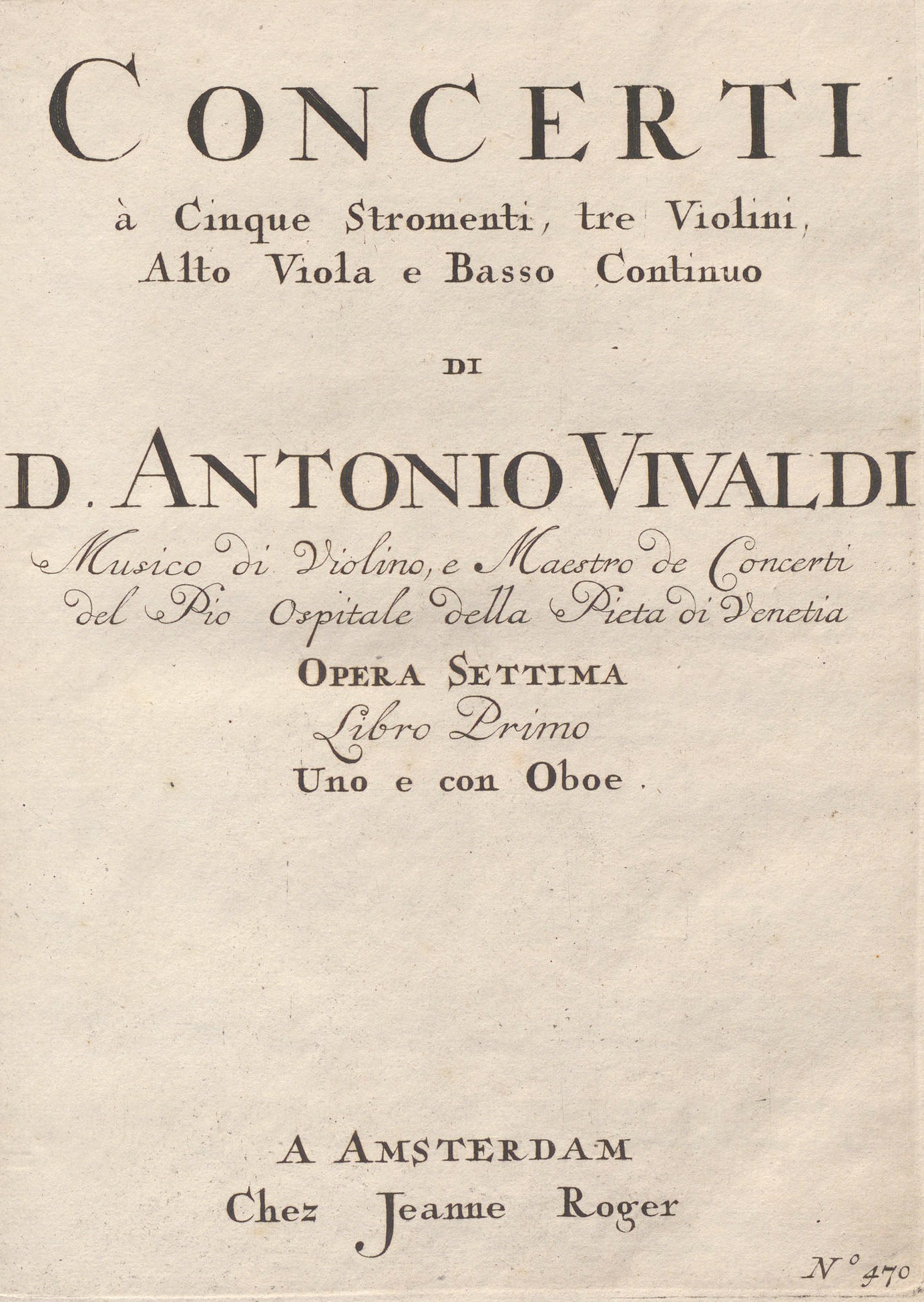
Twelve Concertos, Op. 7

Antonio Vivaldi's set of Twelve Concertos, Op. 7 was published by Estienne Roger in 1720. They are in two volumes, each containing concertos numbered 1–6. Of the set, ten are for violin solo; the other two are for oboe solo (Nos. 1 & 7).

The authenticity of some of the works included has long been doubted by scholars. Three are now considered spurious (i.e. not in fact by Vivaldi) for stylistic reasons. They are: No. 1 in B♭ major for oboe, RV Anh. 143 (formerly RV 465); No. 7 in B♭ major for oboe, RV Anh. 142 (formerly RV 464); and No. 9 in B♭ major for violin, RV Anh. 153 (formerly RV 373).

- Concerto No. 1 for oboe, strings, and basso continuo in B♭ major, RV Anh. 143 (inauthentic)
1. Allegro
2. Adagio
3. Allegro
- Concerto No. 2 for violin, strings and basso continuo in C major, RV 188
1. Allegro
2. Largo
3. Allegro
- Concerto No. 3 for violin, strings and basso continuo in G minor, RV 326
1. Allegro
2. Grave
3. Presto
- Concerto No. 4 for violin, strings and basso continuo in A minor, RV 354
1. Allegro
2. Adagio
3. Allegro
- Concerto No. 5 for violin, strings and basso continuo in F major, RV 285a
1. Allegro
2. Grave - Adagio (Grave)
3. Allegro
- Concerto No. 6 for violin, strings and basso continuo in B♭ major, RV 374
1. Allegro
2. Largo
3. Allegro
- Concerto No. 7 for oboe, strings and basso continuo in B♭ major, RV Anh. 142 (inauthentic)
1. Allegro
2. Largo
3. Allegro
- Concerto No. 8 for violin, strings and basso continuo in G major, RV 299
1. Allegro assai
2. Largo, cantabile
3. Allegro
- Concerto No. 9 for violin, strings and basso continuo in B♭ major, RV Anh. 153 (inauthentic)
1. Allegro
2. Grave
3. Alla breve
- Concerto No. 10 for violin, strings and basso continuo in F major, "Il Ritiro", RV 294a
1. Allegro
2. Adagio
3. Allegro
- Concerto No. 11 for violin, strings and basso continuo in D major, RV 208a
1. Allegro
2. Grave
3. Allegro
- Concerto No. 12 for violin, strings and basso continuo in D major, RV 214
1. Allegro
2. Grave assai
3. Allegro
