= Partita =

Collection of musical pieces

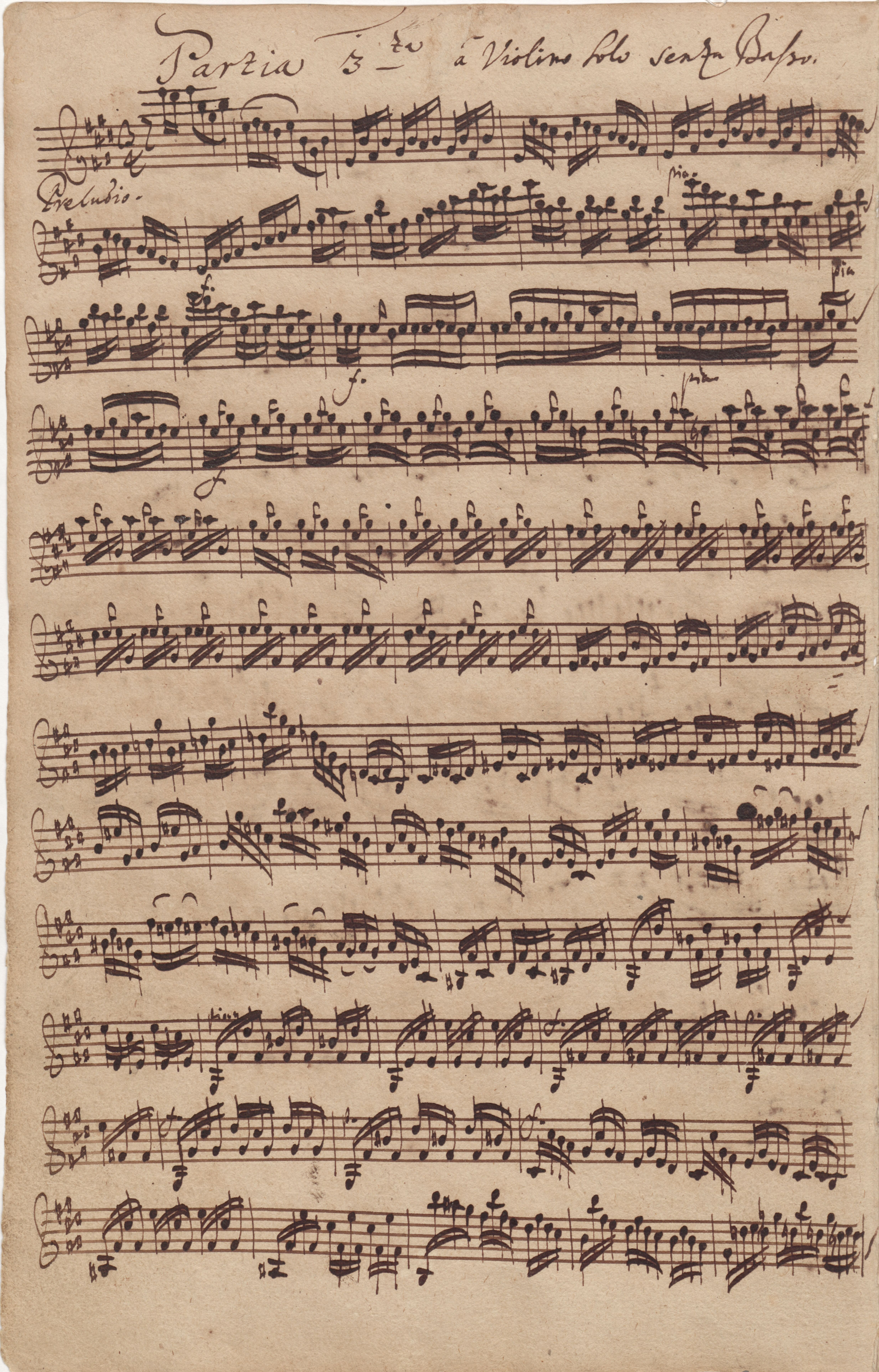
First page of J.S. Bach's Partita for Violin No. 3

A partita (also partie, partia, parthia, or parthie; a term borrowed from the Italian word partita) closely resembles the dance suites of the Baroque Period; the word often occurs as a synonym of suite and variation. It was originally the name for a single-instrumental piece of music (16th and 17th centuries), but Johann Kuhnau (Thomaskantor at Leipzig until 1722), his student Christoph Graupner (1683–1760), and Johann Sebastian Bach (1685–1750) used it for collections of musical pieces, as a synonym for "suite". In the early Baroque period, the term partita referred to a string of variations or a piece in parts that reflected different dances.

== Keyboard partitas ==
Girolamo Frescobaldi (1583–1643) wrote keyboard partitas as variations that were based on popular dance melodies of the early Baroque period such the Romannesca, La Monachina, Ruggiero, and La Follio. Dietrich Buxtehude (1637–1707) and Johann Froberger (1616–1667) wrote dance suites (nineteen and thirty suites respectively). Buxtehude also wrote six sets of variations, later influencing Bach and his partitas. Johann Kuhnau (1660–1722) wrote 14 suites that were called Partien (French partie, meaning 'part'). His ClavierÜbung I contained seven suites in the major keys C, D, E, F, G, A, and B♭. His ClavierÜbung II contained seven suites in the minor keys C, D, E, F, G, A, and B. Each suite (partita) had an opening prelude. Kuhnau also wrote the partita (Italian) Sechs musicalische Partien in 1697. Bach wrote six partitas for the keyboard, his first published work, in 1731, under the same title ClavierÜbung I, following Kuhnau, his predecessor as cantor at the Church of St. Thomas in Leipzig, Germany.

The most prolific composer of partitas for harpsichord was Christoph Graupner (1683–1760), whose works in the form number 57. The first set was published in 1718 and dedicated to his patron Ernest Louis, Landgrave of Hesse-Darmstadt. The last of his partitas exist in manuscripts dated 1750. They are difficult and virtuosic pieces which exhibit an astonishing variety of musical styles. Finished in 2016, Shoah for Solo Violin and Sacred Temple by Jorge Grundman (b. 1961) is the longest partita composed, lasting an hour and a half.

== Johann Sebastian Bach ==
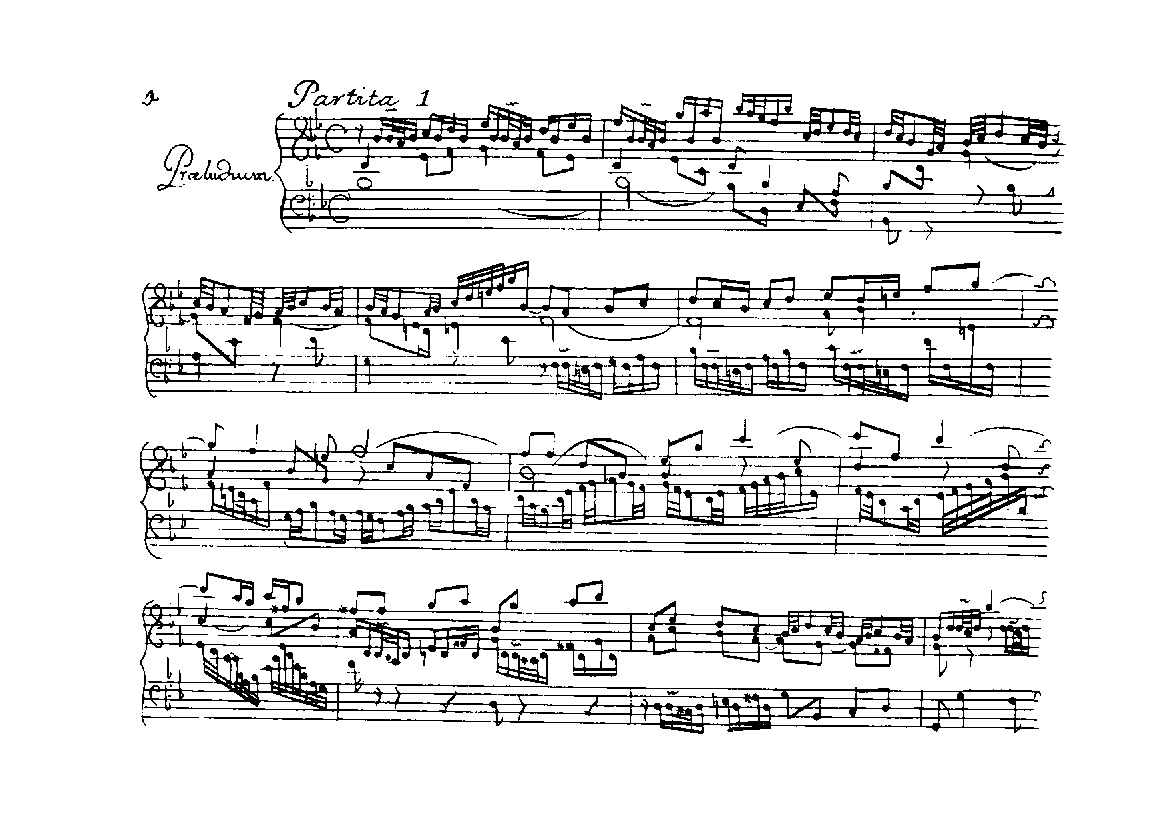
Clavier-Ubung I, BWV 825 Praeludium

Bach's six keyboard partitas were described as having "greater freedom and expansion of form than in the suites." One additional suite in B minor, the Overture in the French Style (often simply called French Overture), is sometimes also considered a partita. As typical of keyboard partitas and dance suites, they were written in binary form with both A and B sections repeated. The A section modulates from the tonic to the dominant key, and the B section moves from the dominant back to the tonic. There are four main movements in a dance suite. The Allemande typically comes first and features running sixteenth notes. The Corrente (Corrante) is fast, beginning with the upbeat of a single note. The Sarabande follows, also beginning with an upbeat, and is set in triple meter. It is slow and emphasizes the second beat of each measure. The final movement, the Gigue, is very fast and often in fugal form.

Bach's first partita (BWV 825) was written in the key of B♭ major and published in 1726. Its introductory movement was a Praeludium, and the partita contained an optional minuet. Partita No. 2 in C minor, BWV 826 was published the following year along with Bach's third partita, beginning with a Sinfonia and including an optional rondeau. A fantasia begins Partita No. 3 in A minor, BWV 827 and includes a burlesca and scherzo. Partita No. 4 in D major, BWV 828, published in 1728, included an optional minuet and aria (air) and began with an overture. Partita No. 5 in G major, BWV 829 is introduced by a Preambulum and optionally includes a minuet and passapied. It was published in 1730 along with Bach's final keyboard partita, Partita No. 6 in E minor, BWV 830, which begins with a Toccata and includes a gavotte and aria (air).

Additionally, Johann Sebastian Bach wrote the "Partita" in A minor for solo flute (BWV 1013), which takes the form of a suite of four dances, has been given the title "partita" by its modern editors; it is sometimes transposed for oboe. Bach also wrote three partitas for solo violin in 1720 which he paired with sonatas. (He titled each of them the German Partia, but they came to be called the Italian partita, which was introduced in the Bach Gesellschaft edition in 1879, being the more common term at the time.) See also: Bach's chorale partitas for organ.

== Examples ==
Listed by composer:

- Johann Paul von Westhoff: Partitas for solo violin
  - Partita No. 1 in A minor
  - Partita No. 2 in A major
  - Partita No. 3 in B♭ major
  - Partita No. 4 in C major
  - Partita No. 5 in D minor
  - Partita No. 6 in D major
- Johann Sebastian Bach:
  - For solo violin (1720):
    - Partita for Violin No. 1 in B minor, BMV 1002
    - Partita for Violin No. 2 in D minor, BMV 1004
    - Partita for Violin No. 3 in E major, BMV 1006
  - For solo flute:
    - Partita in A minor for solo flute, BMV 1013
  - For keyboard (1726):
    - Partita No. 1 in B♭ major, BWV 825
    - Partita No. 2 in C minor, BWV 826
    - Partita No. 3 in A minor, BWV 827
    - Partita No. 4 in D major, BWV 828
    - Partita No. 5 in G major, BWV 829
    - Partita No. 6 in E minor, BWV 830
- Christoph Graupner:
  - Monatliche Clavier Früchte, GWV 109–120. 12 Partitas for Harpsichord (1722)
  - 45 Partitas for Harpsichord (1718–1750)
- Franz Joseph Haydn
  - Partita in G major, Hob XVI:6 (c. 1760-1766) for keyboard
- Franz Krommer:
  - 38 partitas for wind ensemble
- Luigi Dallapiccola: Partita for orchestra (1932)
- William Walton: Partita for Orchestra (1957)
- Krzysztof Penderecki: Partita for Harpsichord and Orchestra (1972)
- Caroline Shaw: Partita for 8 Voices (2012)
- Philip Glass:
  - Partita for Double Bass (2015)
  - Partita No. 1 for Solo Cello, "Songs and Poems"
  - Partita No. 2 for Solo Cello
- Jorge Grundman:
  - Shoah for Solo Violin and Sacred Temple (2016)
- Stephen Hough: Partita for piano (2019)
- Anton García Abril: 6 Partitas (2019) for solo violin.

== Audio files ==
Bach: Keyboard Partita No. 6 in E minor, BWV 830 I. Toccata

Bach: Keyboard Partita No. 4 in D major, BWV 828 V. Sarabande

Johann Kuhnau: Choral partita from 'Biblische Historien'. Here it is called 'Sonata 4' (a programmatic title is added). The tune or cantus firmus is the famous chorale O Haupt voll Blut und Wunden.
