= Johann Georg Pisendel =

German Baroque composer (1687–1755)

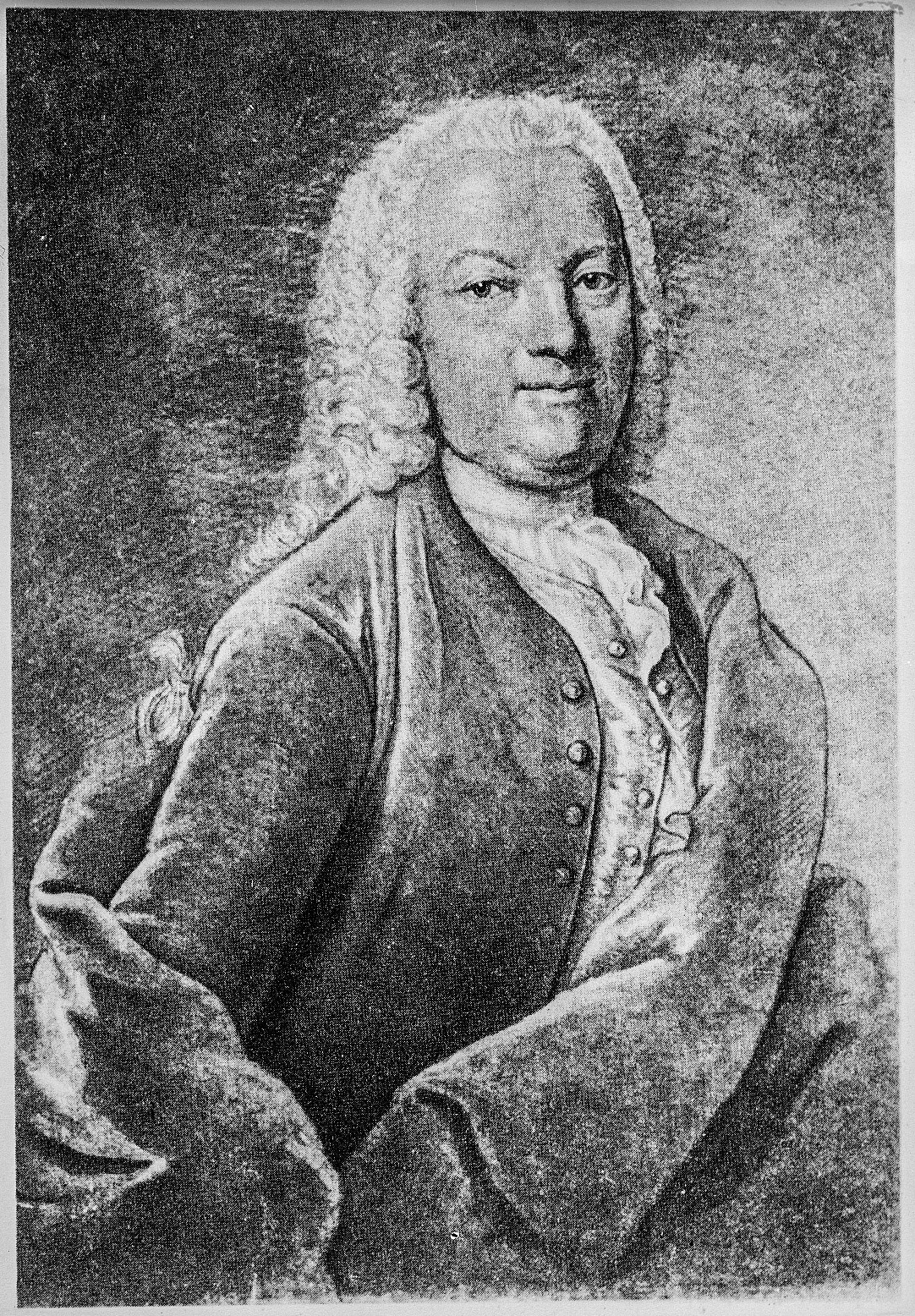
- Portrait of Pisendel, drawn by an artist only known as "Frank"
- Born: 5 January 1688 [O.S. 26 December 1687] Cadolzburg
- Died: 25 November 1755 (aged 67); Dresden
- Education: Leipzig University
- Occupations: Violinist; composer
- Organizations: Dresden Court Orchestra

Johann Georg Pisendel (5 January 1688 [O.S. 26 December 1687] – 25 November 1755) was a German Baroque violinist and composer who, for many years, led the Court Orchestra in Dresden as concertmaster, then the finest instrumental ensemble in Europe. He was the leading violinist of his time, and composers such as Tomaso Albinoni, Georg Philipp Telemann and Antonio Vivaldi all dedicated violin compositions to him.

== Life ==
Pisendel was born in Cadolzburg, a small town near Nuremberg, in Bavaria where his father Simon Pisendel was the cantor and organist. At the age of nine, Johann Georg became a choirboy at the court chapel of Ansbach, where the singer Francesco Antonio Pistocchi was music director, and violinist and composer Giuseppe Torelli was concert master. It is thought that Pisendel studied voice with Pistocchi and the violin with Torelli. After his voice broke, Pisendel went on to play the violin in the Court Orchestra in 1704. In 1709, he left Dresden for Leipzig, both in Saxony, to further his musical studies.

On the way to Leipzig, he met Johann Sebastian Bach at Weimar. Pisendel was a member of the Collegium Musicum founded by Georg Philipp Telemann, and conducted it in 1710/11, while Melchior Hoffmann went on a concert tour. In 1711, after he performed at Darmstadt in an opera by Christoph Graupner, Pisendel was offered a position in the court orchestra there, but declined.

In 1711, he was offered a position as leading violinist at the Dresden Court Orchestra, which he accepted and began in January 1712. He studied composition there with Johann David Heinichen. He remained with the Dresden orchestra for the rest of his life. He was sent to represent the culture of Dresden in Europe by Elector Frederick Augustus II, to Paris in 1714, to Berlin in 1715, and to Venice in 1716, where he stayed for nine months and studied with Antonio Vivaldi.

In 1730, Pisendel became officially concert master of the Dresden Court Orchestra, a position he had filled already since Jean-Baptiste Volumier had died in 1728. Pisendel's pupils included Franz Benda and Johann Gottlieb Graun.

Pisendel died in Dresden.

== Work ==
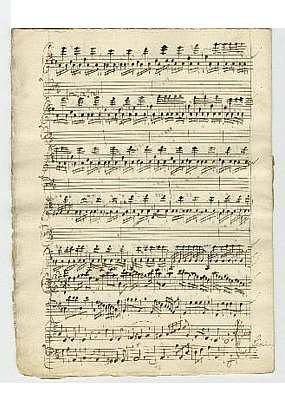
Autograph score of Violin Sonata in D major

Pisendel's surviving compositions are few in number but high in quality. All of his surviving works are instrumental. They include ten violin concertos, four concertos for orchestra, and two violin sonatas. His sonata for violin solo in A minor possibly influenced Bach's works in the genre.

Bach possibly wrote his violin sonatas for Pisendel. Tomaso Albinoni, Vivaldi and Telemann all dedicated works to him. A collection of extant instrumental works from the first half of the eighteenth century, which were kept in the so-called Schrank II (Cabinet II) of the Hofkirche, includes these dedications, numerous manuscripts with performance instructions in Pisendel's own hand, and scores he had copied himself. The Saxon State and University Library Dresden and the German Research Foundation completed digitizing the Schrank II collection in the summer of 2011, leading researchers to further study Pisendel's musical legacy.

== Recordings ==
- Pisendel. Neue Sonaten. Newly discovered sonatas for violin and continuo by Pisendel. Scaramuccia (Snakewood Editions, 2020)
- Violin concertos from Dresden. Pisendel, Heinichen, Fasch, Handel, Telemann. Johannes Pramsohler. International Baroque Players. (Raumklang RK 3105)
- J. G. Pisendel: Dresden Concertos. Concerti con varii strumenti (Concertos for various instruments). Performed by the Freiburg Baroque Orchestra with Gottfried von der Goltz and Petra Müllejans, solo violinists, conducted by Gottfried von der Goltz. (Carus 83301)
- Per Monsieur Pisendel. Violin sonatas by Vivaldi, Albinoni, & Pisendel. Performed by La Serenissima conducted by Adrian Chandler (Avie 0018) Six violin sonatas dedicated to or composed by Pisendel himself.
- 1717. Memories of a Journey to Italy. Pisendel, Vivaldi, Montanari, Fanfani, Valentini and Albinoni. Ensemble Scaramuccia. (Snakewood Editions, 2018). Music collected or composed by Pisendel during his journey to Italy 1716–1717
- Concerto in G minor for violin and orchestra, Il pomo d'oro, Dmitry Sinkovsky, violin and conductor. CD Naîve 2019
