= Partita for Violin No. 1 (Bach) =

Composition by Johan Sebastian Bach

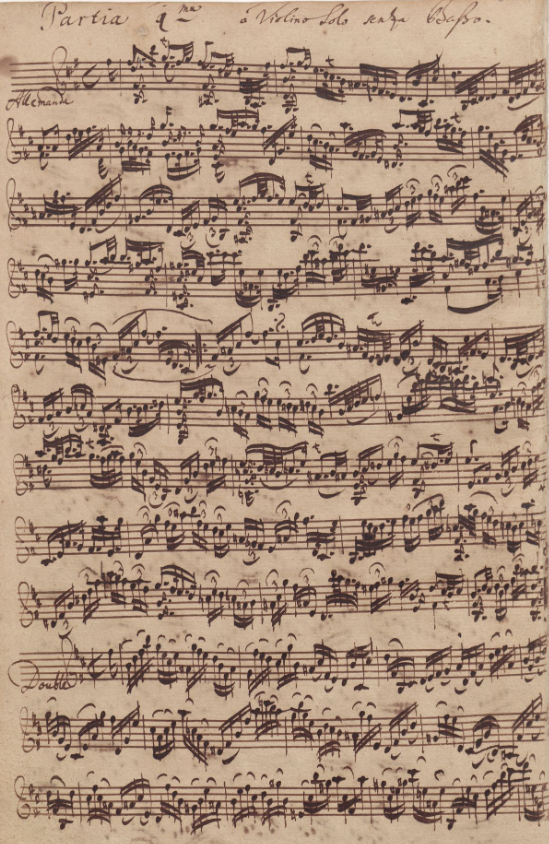
Bach's autograph of Allemanda

The Partita No. 1 in B minor, BWV 1002 by Johann Sebastian Bach, is a piece for solo violin composed by 1720. This partita is formed in the traditional way that consists of an allemande, a courante, sarabande and gigue in the baroque style, except that this work substitutes a bourrée (marked Tempo di Borea) for the more typical gigue. Also, each movement is followed by a variation called double in French, which elaborates on the chords of the prior movement. The movements in order are:

1. Allemanda – Double
2. Corrente – Double (Presto)
3. Sarabande – Double
4. Tempo di Borea – Double

== See also ==
- Sonatas and partitas for solo violin (Bach)
