= Rainer Kussmaul =

German violinist and conductor

- Born: 3 June 1946; Mannheim, Germany
- Origin: Germany
- Died: 27 March 2017 (aged 70) Freiburg, Germany
- Occupation: Conductor
- Instrument: violin

Rainer Kussmaul (3 June 1946 – 27 March 2017) was a German Grammy Award-winning violinist and conductor. Kussmaul was born in Mannheim and studied at the State Academy of Fine Arts Stuttgart. He was professor in Freiburg, first concertmaster of the Berlin Philharmonic and led the Berliner Barocksolisten. He died in Freiburg at age 70.

== Family and Early Life ==
Rainer Kussmaul, one of three brothers, received his first violin lessons from his father Willy Kussmaul who was solo viola in the orchestra of the National Theater Mannheim. After studying in Mannheim and with Ricardo Odnoposoff at the Stuttgart State University of Music and Performing Arts, Rainer Kussmaul soon won prizes in international competitions, both as a soloist and with his co-founded Stuttgart Piano Trio from 1968, the year of its founding, to 1997.

== Teaching ==
Due to his talent he was also a popular music professor. Since 1977, he worked as a violin professor at the Freiburg Hochschule für Musik, preferring to teach the Baroque style. Among his students were Petra Müllejans, Gottfried von der Goltz, Daishin Kashimoto, and Jermulai Albiker. Later, in 1987, he was appointed director of the Academy in Baden-Baden.

== Awards and honors ==
- 2005: Grammy Award for Bach cantatas recording
- 2010: Order of Merit of the Federal Republic of Germany
- 2012: Reinhold Schneider Prize from the city of Freiburg im Breisgau
- 2017: Honorary citizenship of the Italian city of Sessa Aurunca
