= Giuseppe Valentini =

Italian composer (1681–1753)

Giuseppe Valentini (14 December 1681 – November 1753), nicknamed Straccioncino (Little Ragamuffin), was an Italian violinist, painter, poet, and composer, though he is known chiefly as a composer of inventive instrumental music.

He studied under Giovanni Bononcini in Rome between 1692 and 1697. From 1710 to 1727 he served as ‘Suonator di Violino, e Componitore di Musica’ to Prince Michelangelo Caetani. He also succeeded Arcangelo Corelli as director of the concertino at San Luigi dei Francesi, from 1710 to 1741.

Though during his lifetime overshadowed by the likes of Corelli, Vivaldi, and Locatelli, his contribution to Italian baroque music is noteworthy, and many of his works were published throughout Europe.

== Selected works ==
=== Instrumental Music ===
- op. 1: 12 Sinfonie (with Sinfonia a tre per il santissimo Natale Nr. 12) (1701 Rome)
- op. 2: 7 Bizzarie per camera for 2 Violins, Viola and Basso continuo (1703 Rome)
- op. 3: 12 Fantasie musicali for 2 Violins and Bass (1706 Rome)
- op. 4: 7 Idee per camera for Violin and Basso continuo (1706 Rome)
- op. 5: 12 Sonate a tre (Villeggiature armoniche) (1707 Rome)
- op. 6: 6 Poesie: Concerti a 4 violini, violoncello e basso continuo (unpublished)
- op. 7: 7 Concerto a Quattro Violini (Concerti grossi) (1710 Rome)
- op. 8: 12 Allettamenti per camera (1714 Rome)
- op. 9: 10 Concerti con ripieni (Concerti grossi) (1724 Amsterdam)
- opp. 10–15: unpublished (promised in the preface to op. 8):
  - Op. 10: [Sonate] a Violino solo con un secondo Violino a beneplacito
  - Op. 11: I Pianti fortunati di Gileno Poemetto in Ottava Rima
  - Op. 12: Idee a Violino solo a due e tre Corde
  - Op. 13: Concerti grossi di Trombe, Obue e diversi altri Stromenti
  - Op. 14: Salmi brevi a quattro per tutti i Vesperi
  - Op. 15: Balletti
- 7 Concerti for 2 Violins, 2 Horns (Trombe da Caccia) and Basso Continuo (MS in Danish Royal Library)

=== Operas ===
- La finta rapita (1714 Cisterna)
- La costanza in amore (1715 Cisterna)

=== Oratorios ===
- Cantata per la natività della Beatissima Vergine (Son l'origine di tutti) (1723 Rome)
- Cantata in lode di Benedetto XIII (Amica e cara fede) (1724 Rome)

== Sources ==
- Opera at Stanford University
- Grove Music Online

== Selected discography ==
- 1717. Memories of a Journey to Italy. Pisendel, Vivaldi, Montanari, Fanfani, Valentini and Albinoni. Ensemble Scaramuccia. (Snakewood Editions, 2018).
