= Scaramucci (surname) =

Scaramucci is an Italian surname. Notable people with the surname include:

- Anthony Scaramucci (born 1964), American financier, writer, and briefly the Communications Director for Donald Trump
- Maurizio Scaramucci (born 1970), Italian footballer

== See also ==
- Scaramuccia (surname)
