= Scaramuccia (disambiguation) =

Scaramuccia is a stock comic character.

Scaramuccia may also refer to:

- Scaramuccia Trivulzio (d. 1527), Roman Catholic cardinal
- Scaramuccia da Forlì (d. 1450), Italian condottiero (mercenary leader)
- Scaramuccia, early music ensemble
- Scaramuccia, Italian surname
