= Johann Adam Birkenstock =

German composer and violinist

- Born: 19 February 1687
- Died: 26 February 1733 (aged 46)
- Other names: Birckenstock, Birkenstok, Berkenstock
- Era: Baroque

Johann Adam Birkenstock (also Birckenstock, Birkenstok, Berkenstock; 19 February 1687 – 26 February 1733) was a German composer and violinist. He was regarded as one of the foremost violinists of his day.

== Life ==
As a young boy, Birkenstock studied with Ruggiero Fedeli in Kassel, but he was soon sent to Berlin to engage in additional studies with Jean Baptiste Volumier. After that, Birkenstock went to Bayreuth to study with Fiorelli. In 1708 he completed his studies with Francois Duval in Paris. Upon his return to Kassel, he became a member of the kapelle in 1708 where he stayed until 1722 when he embarked on a concert tour to Holland. There, Birkenstock was offered a post in the retinue of the King of Portugal. He turned down the offer and after his return to Kassel he was appointed Konzertmeister of the local chapel in 1725. When the Landgrave of Kassel died in 1730, Birkenstock moved to Eisenach where he became the Kapellmeister of the court.

== Works ==
- Sinfonia in D Major
- 12 Sonate, op. 1 for violin and basso continuo (Amsterdam, 1722)
- 6 Sonatas for 2 violins and basso continuo.
