= Sonatas and Partitas for Solo Violin (Bach) =

Set of compositions by Johann Sebastian Bach

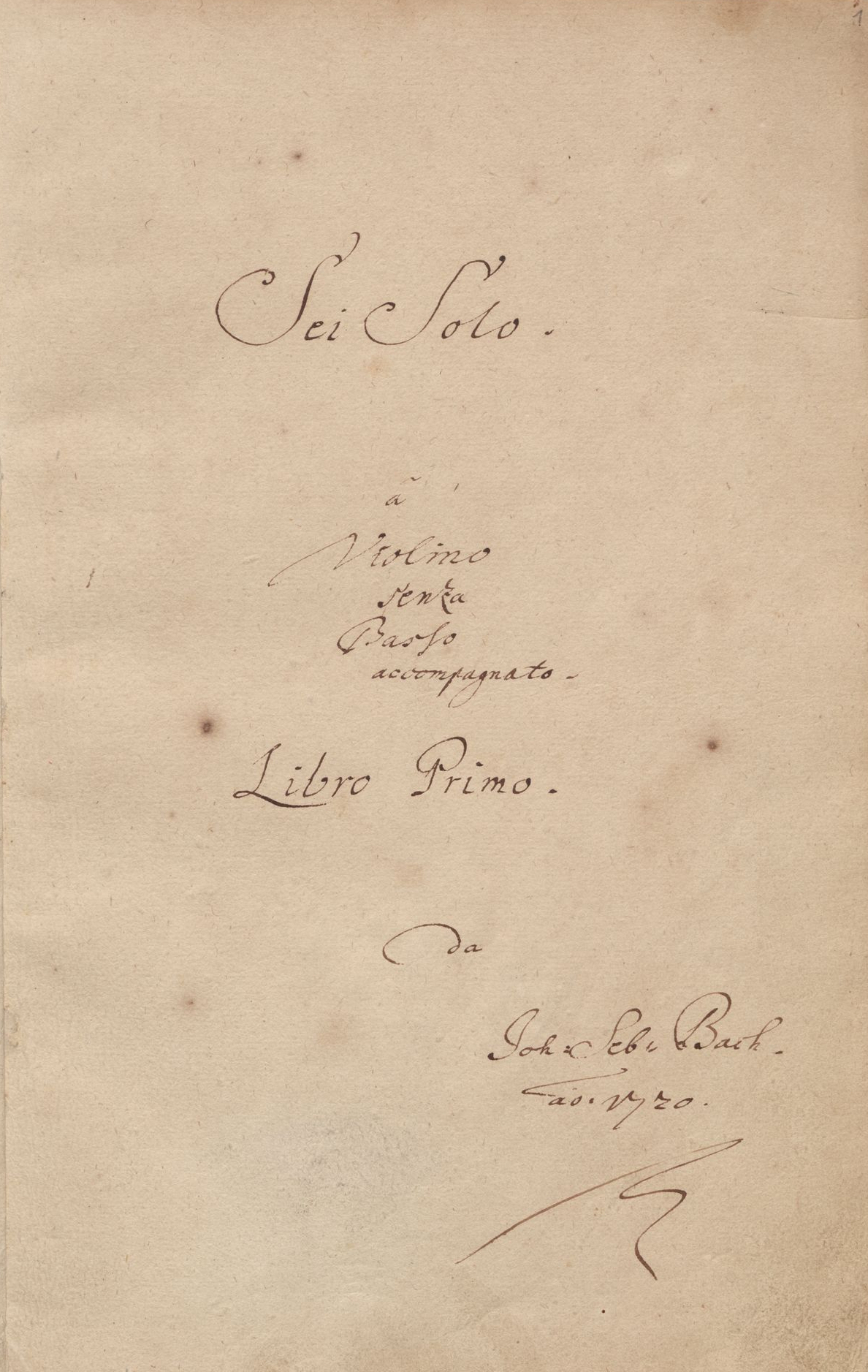
Title page of the autograph manuscript of BWV 1001–1006, dated 1720

The Sonatas and Partitas for Solo Violin (BWV 1001–1006) are a set of six works composed by Johann Sebastian Bach. They are sometimes referred to in English as the Sonatas and Partias for Solo Violin in accordance with Bach's headings in the autograph manuscript: "Partia" (plural "Partien") was commonly used in German-speaking regions during Bach's time, whereas the Italian "Partita" was introduced to this set in the 1879 Bach Gesellschaft edition, having become standard by that time. The set consists of three sonatas da chiesa in four movements and three partitas (or partias) in Baroque suite dance-form movements. The 2nd Partita is widely known for its chaconne, considered one of the most masterful and expressive works ever written for solo violin.

The set was completed by 1720 but was not published until 1802 by Nikolaus Simrock in Bonn. Even after publication, it was largely ignored until the celebrated violinist Joseph Joachim started performing these works. Today, Bach's 'Sonatas and Partitas are an essential part of the violin repertoire, and they are frequently performed and recorded.

The Sei Solo a Violino senza Basso accompagnato (Six Solos for Violin Without Bass Accompaniment), as Bach titled them, firmly established the technical capability of the violin as a solo instrument. The pieces often served as archetypes for solo violin pieces by later generations of composers, including Eugène Ysaÿe and Béla Bartók.

== History of composition ==
The surviving autograph manuscript of the sonatas and partitas was made by Bach in 1720 in Köthen, where he was Kapellmeister. As Christoph Wolff comments, the paucity of sources for instrumental compositions prior to Bach's period in Leipzig makes it difficult to establish a precise chronology; nevertheless, a copy made by the Weimar organist Johann Gottfried Walther in 1714 of the Fugue in G minor for violin and continuo, BWV 1026, which has violinistic writing similar to that in BWV 1001–1006, provides support for the commonly held view that the collection could have been reworked from pieces originally composed in Weimar. Bach could have begun composition as early as 1703 during his first Weimar years, having met Johann Paul von Westhoff, a violinist and composer who published a number of works for unaccompanied violin. Nevertheless, composition probably began by 1717, at the onset of Bach's tenure in Köthen.

The goal of producing a polyphonic texture governed by the rules of counterpoint also indicates the influence of the first surviving works of this kind for solo violin, Westhoff's partitas for solo violin composed in 1696. The virtuoso violinist Westhoff served as court musician in Dresden from 1674 to 1697 and in Weimar from 1699 until his death in 1705, so Bach would have known him for two years. The repertoire for solo violin was actively growing at the time: Heinrich Ignaz Franz Biber's celebrated solo passacaglia appeared c.1676; Westhoff's collections of solo violin music were published in 1682 and 1696; Johann Joseph Vilsmayr's Artificiosus Concentus pro Camera in 1715, and Johann Georg Pisendel's solo violin sonata was composed around 1716; and finally, Georg Philipp Telemann published 12 Fantasias for solo violin in 1735.

=== First performance ===
It is not known whether these violin solos were performed during Bach's lifetime or, if they were, who the performer was. Johann Georg Pisendel and Jean-Baptiste Volumier, both talented violinists in the Dresden court, have been suggested as possible performers, as was Joseph Spiess, leader of the orchestra in Köthen. Friedrich Wilhelm Rust, who would later become part of the Bach family circle in Leipzig, also became a likely candidate. Bach himself was an able violinist from his youth, and his familiarity with the violin and its literature shows in the composition of the set and the very detailed autograph manuscript. According to his son Carl Philipp Emanuel Bach, "in his youth, and until the approach of old age, he played the violin cleanly and powerfully".

== Manuscripts and published editions ==
Upon Bach's death in 1750, the original manuscript passed into the possession, possibly through his second wife Anna Magdalena, of Johann Christoph Friedrich Bach. It was inherited by the last male descendant of J. C. F. Bach, Wilhelm Friedrich Ernst Bach, who passed it on to his sister Christina Louisa Bach (1762–1852).

Four other early manuscripts also exist. One, originally identified as an authentic Bach autograph from his Leipzig period, is now identified as being a copy dating from 1727–32 by Bach's second wife Anna Magdalena Bach, and is the companion to her copy of the six suites Bach wrote for solo cello.

A copy deriving from circa 1723 and 1726 was completed by two unknown scribes of Bach's inner circle. Peter Wollny believes one of the copyists may well have been Georg Gottfried Wagner, a violinist who played a prominent role in Bach's church performances. This source was copied from the original autograph manuscript and also includes a number of editorial markings, which may reflect Bach's own musical and technical intentions for these compositions. It was discovered in 1814 by music collector Georg Poelchau in Saint Petersburg, apparently amongst a stack of papers destined to be used as butter-wrappings. Poelchau believed this copy was of Bach's own hand, but this was later proven false. Despite this, the belief that the original autograph manuscript was nearly used as butter-wrappings continued through the 20th century. Indeed, Ivan Galamian's 1971 edition of the Sonatas and Partitas included a brief foreword by Paul Affelder which erroneously claims the original autograph manuscript was destined for butter-wrappings.

Another copy, dated July 3, 1726 (the date is on the final page), made by one of Bach's admirers Johann Peter Kellner, is well preserved, despite the fact that the B minor Partita was missing from the set and that there are numerous deviations and omissions. These differences may have come from an earlier source or composing copy, and not necessarily copying errors on Kellner's part. This view is supported by Zoltán Szabó. The three manuscripts are in the Berlin State Museum and have been in the possession of the Bach-Gesellschaft since 1879, through the efforts of Alfred Dörffel. Two other eighteenth century manuscripts, both by unidentified copyists, have also survived.

The first edition was printed in 1802 by Nikolaus Simrock of Bonn. It is clear from errors in it that it was not made with reference to Bach's own manuscript, and it has many mistakes that were frequently repeated in later editions of the 19th century.

== Performers ==
Virtually every great violin performer has recorded the Sonatas and Partitas, often multiple times, as in the case of Joseph Szigeti, Nathan Milstein, Yehudi Menuhin, Henryk Szeryng and many other distinguished players. Strikingly, David Oistrakh, the towering performer of the violin, is not known to have recorded the complete set of Sonatas and Partitas. One of the most famous performers of the Sonatas and Partitas was the violinist and composer George Enescu, who considered this work as "The Himalayas of violinists" and recorded all the sonatas and partitas in the late 1940s. One of his students (Serge Blanc) collected the notes of his master Enescu regarding sonority, phrasing, tempo, fingering and expression, in a now freely distributed document.

== Musical structure ==
The sonatas each consist of four movements, in the typical slow-fast-slow-fast pattern of the sonata da chiesa. The first two movements of each sonata are a prelude and a fugue. The third (slow) movement is lyrical, while the final movement shares the similar musical structure as a typical binary suite movement. Unlike the sonatas, the partitas are of more unorthodox design. Although still making use of the usual baroque style of allemande, courante, sarabande, and gigue, with some omissions and the addition of galanteries, new elements were introduced into each partita to provide variety.

== Alternative scoring ==
Aside from the surviving transcriptions BWV 964 and 968, two different sources also indicate that Bach and his circle performed the Sonatas and Partitas on keyboard instruments, rather than on the violin. Music theorist, instrument maker and organ player Jakob Adlung writes (Anleitung zu der musikalischen Gelahrtheit, Erfurt, 1758), regarding the keyboard works by Bach – ”They are actually violini soli senza basso, 3 Sonatas and 3 Partitas, which are well suited for performance on the keyboard”. Johann Friedrich Agricola, who co-wrote Bach's obituary, reports that ”Their composer often played them himself on the clavichord, and added so m[any] harmonies to them, as he found necessary”.

== The pieces and their movements ==
=== Sonata No. 1 in G minor, BWV 1001 ===
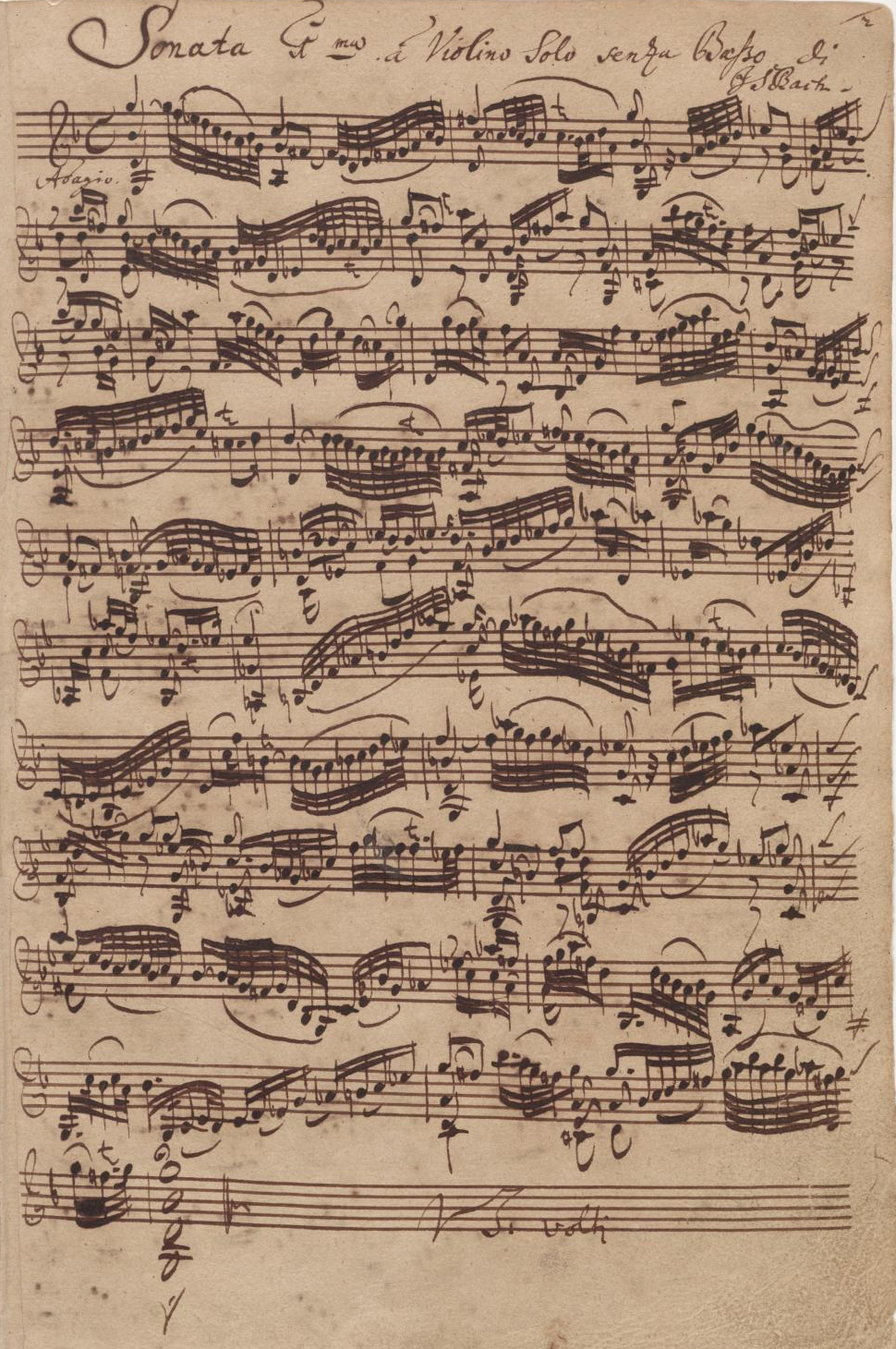
Bach's autograph of the Adagio of Sonata No. 1 in G minor, BWV 1001

1. Adagio
2. Fuga (Allegro)
3. Siciliana
4. Presto

Though the key signature of the manuscript suggests D minor, such was a notational convention in the Baroque period, and therefore does not necessarily imply that the piece is in the Dorian mode. The second movement, the fugue, would later be reworked for the organ (in the Prelude and Fugue, BWV 539) and the lute (Fugue, BWV 1000), with the latter being two bars longer than the violin version.

=== Partita No. 1 in B minor, BWV 1002 ===
1. Allemanda – Double
2. Corrente – Double (Presto)
3. Sarabande – Double
4. Tempo di Borea – Double

This partita substitutes a bourrée (marked Tempo di Borea) for the gigue. Each movement is followed by a variation (double in French).

=== Sonata No. 2 in A minor, BWV 1003 ===
1. Grave
2. Fuga
3. Andante
4. Allegro

=== Partita No. 2 in D minor, BWV 1004 ===
1. Allemanda
2. Corrente
3. Sarabanda
4. Giga
5. Ciaccona

In the original manuscript, Bach marked Segue la Corrente at the end of Allemanda. The monumental Chaconne, the last and most famous movement of the suite, was regarded as "the greatest structure for solo violin that exists" by Yehudi Menuhin. It involves a set of variations based on a simple phrase repeated in harmonic progression in the bass line (ground bass).

=== Sonata No. 3 in C major, BWV 1005 ===
1. Adagio
2. Fuga
3. Largo
4. Allegro assai

The opening movement of the work introduced a peaceful, slow stacking up of notes, a technique once thought to be impossible on bowed instruments. The fugue is the most complex and extensive of the three, with the subject derived from the chorale Komm, heiliger Geist, Herre Gott. Bach employs many contrapuntal techniques, including a stretto, an inversion, as well as diverse examples of double counterpoint.

=== Partita No. 3 in E major, BWV 1006 ===
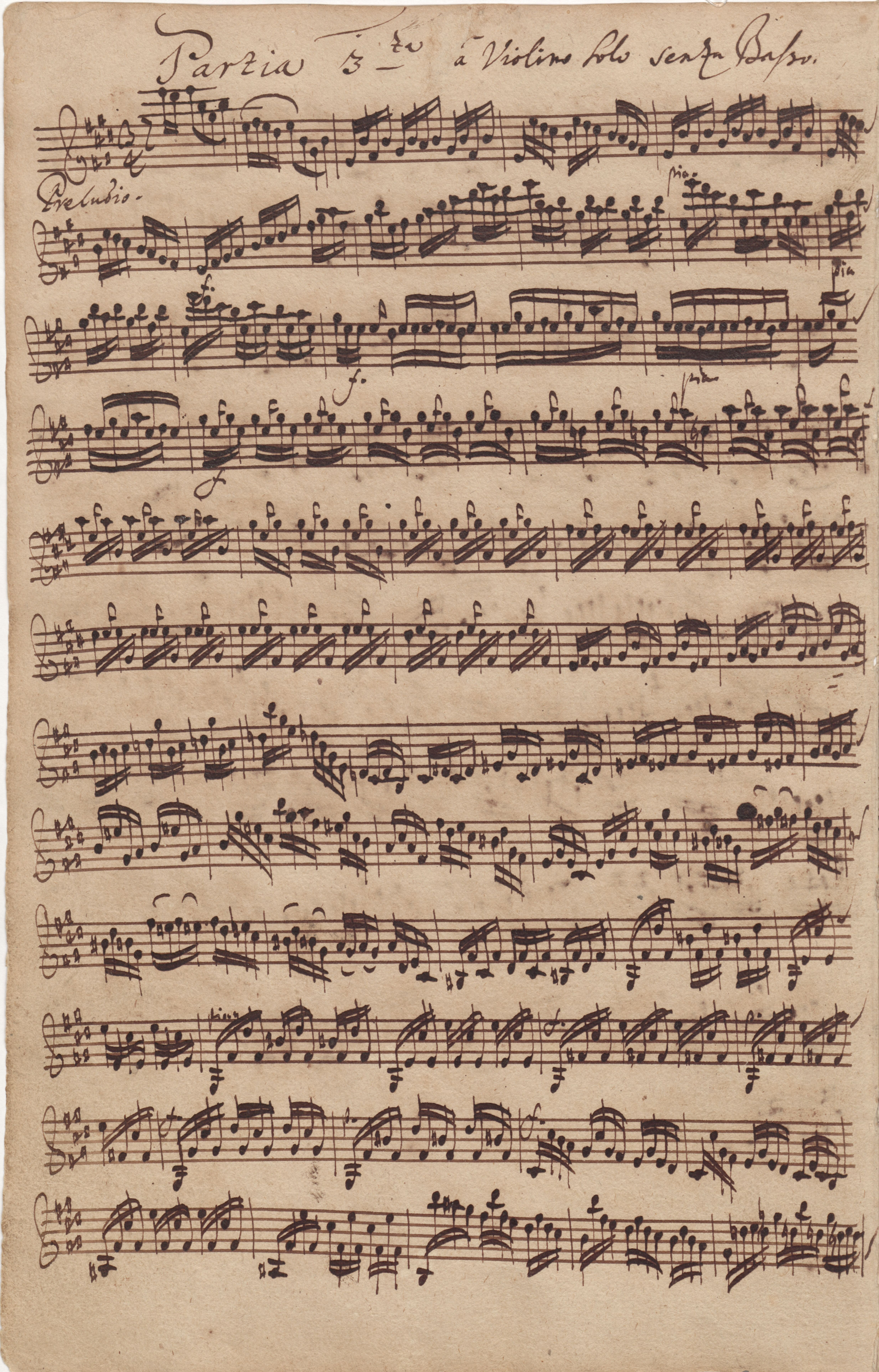
Autograph of the opening Preludio in Partita No. 3 in E major, BWV 1006.

1. Preludio
2. Loure
3. Gavotte en rondeau
4. Menuet I
5. Menuet II
6. Bourrée
7. Gigue

== Selected arrangements and transcriptions ==
- J. S. Bach transcribed for keyboard, organ or lute various movements from these suites. Some of them were later attributed to his pupils. Arrangements of the Sonatas and Partitas for keyboard appear in the Miscellaneous Keyboard Works, Bach Gesellschaft Edition, 1853 (reissued by Dover Publications).
  - Fugue in D minor, BWV 539/ii (BWV 1001/ii) for organ
  - Fugue in G minor, BWV 1000 (BWV 1001/ii) for lute
  - Suite in E major, BWV 1006a (BWV 1006) for lute or keyboard
  - Sonata in D minor, BWV 964 (BWV 1003, doubtful) for keyboard
  - Adagio in G major, BWV 968 (from BWV 1005, doubtful) for keyboard
- Chaconne, BWV 1004.
  - Johannes Brahms, piano left hand
  - Ferruccio Busoni, piano solo
  - William Thomas Best, organ
  - Henri Messerer, organ
  - Matthias Keller, organ, Carus-Verlag, 2011
  - Arno Landmann, organ, Simrock Verlag
  - Gustav Leonhardt, harpsichord
  - Pieter-Jan Belder, harpsichord
- Preludio, BWV 1006
  - J. S. Bach, Sinfonia in BWV 29, a reworking of the Preludio from BWV 1006 for obbligato organ, trumpets, oboes and strings
  - Various arrangements for organ of the sinfonia, including the versions by Alexandre Guilmant, Marcel Dupré and Friedemann Winklhofer (Hans Sikorski)
- British lutenist Nigel North transcribed the entire sequence for lute, as well as Bach's Cello Suites and recorded them on four CDs for Linn Records (volumes 1 to 4, respectively CKD 013, CKD 029, CKD 049, CKD 055)
- Swiss-American lutenist Hopkinson Smith transcribed the entire sequence for baroque lute, as well as Bach's Cello Suites for the theorbo and recorded them on three CDs for Naïve Records (Sonatas and Partitas on E 8678, Suites 1 to 3 on E 8937, and Suites 4 to 6 on E 8938)

== Selected recordings ==
Classical violin

- Joseph Szigeti, 1931 (selected for the NARAS Hall of Fame) and 1956
- Yehudi Menuhin, 1934–1944 and 1957 and 1975
- George Enescu, 1948
- Jascha Heifetz, 1952
- Henryk Szeryng, 1954 and 1967
- Emil Telmányi, 1954
- Nathan Milstein, 1956 and 1973
- Arthur Grumiaux, 1961, included on the Voyager Golden Record
- Gidon Kremer, 1980 and 2005
- Oscar Shumsky, 1983
- Shlomo Mintz, 1984
- Itzhak Perlman, 1988
- Ida Haendel, 1995
- Salvatore Accardo, 1996
- Vanessa-Mae, 1996
- Dmitry Sitkovetsky, 1997
- James Ehnes, 2000
- Gregory Fulkerson, 2000
- Christian Tetzlaff, 1993, 2006 and 2017
- Viktoria Mullova, 2009
- Isabelle Faust, 2010–2012
- Gil Shaham, 2014
- Kyung Wha Chung, 2016
- Julia Fischer, 2017 (re-release)
- Hilary Hahn, 1997 and 2018
- Milan Pala, 2018
- Augustin Hadelich, 2021

Baroque violin

- Sergiu Luca, 1977
- Sigiswald Kuijken, 1981, 1999-2000
- Jaap Schröder, 1984–1985
- Monica Huggett, 1991
- Lucy van Dael, 1996
- Rachel Podger, 1998–1999
- Elizabeth Wallfisch, 1997
- Ingrid Matthews, 2000
- Hélène Schmitt, 2004
- John Holloway, 2004
- Pavlo Beznosiuk, 2007
- Alina Ibragimova, 2008-2009
- Amandine Beyer, 2011
- Stanley Ritchie, 2013
- Rachel Barton Pine, 2016
- Giuliano Carmignola, 2018
- Fabio Biondi, 2020
- Bojan Čičić, 2021

Viola

- Scott Slapin, 2006

Violoncello

- Tanya Anisimova, 2001
- Mario Brunello, 2019

Keyboard

- Robert Hill, 1999

Mandolin

- Chris Thile, 2013, 2025
- Avi Avital, 2019

Guitar

- Kazuhito Yamashita, 1989
- Paul Galbraith, 1998 (8-string guitar)
- Eliot Fisk, 2001
- Frank Bungarten, 2001
- Timo Korhonen, 2009/2010
- Francesco Teopini, 2016
- Franz Halász, 2024

Lute

- Nigel North, 1985
- Hopkinson Smith, 2000
