= Scaramouche (disambiguation) =

Scaramouche is a stock comic character.

Scaramouche may also refer to:

== Arts and entertainment ==
- Scaramouche (novel), a 1921 novel by Rafael Sabatini
  - Scaramouche (1923 film), adapted from Sabatini's novel
  - Scaramouche (1952 film), starring Stewart Granger and also adapted from the novel
- Scaramouche (Sibelius) (1913), a tragic pantomime by Poul Knudsen (1889–1970), with incidental music by Sibelius
- Scaramouche, stage name of Tiberio Fiorilli (1608–1694), Italian actor
- Scaramouche (Milhaud), a suite for two pianos (later arranged for other combinations) by Darius Milhaud
- Scaramouche, a character in the musical We Will Rock You based on the music of British rock band Queen
- Scaramouche the Merciless, a character in Samurai Jack that is based on Sammy Davis Jr.
- Scaramouche, the previous incarnation of Wanderer, a character in 2020 video game Genshin Impact

== Other uses ==
- Scaramouche, a section of the Vatican Secret Archives, according to the archives published index
- Scaramouche, from the archaic Italian meaning skirmish

== See also ==
- Scaramucce, third studio album of Rondò Veneziano
- Scaramuccia (music ensemble), early music ensemble founded in 2013
