= Petra Müllejans =

German musician (born 1959)

Petra Müllejans (born 1959 in Düsseldorf) is a German violinist, conductor and pedagogue, known especially for her work in historical performance practice and as a co-founder and performer with the Freiburger Barockorchester.

Müllejans received her first violin lessons at the age of eight in Meerbusch. At age 12, she was accepted as a student at the Düsseldorf Academy of Music; among her teachers was the violin teacher, musicologist and Bach researcher Helga Thoene. At 21, she moved to the Hochschule für Musik Freiburg, where she studied with Rainer Kussmaul; it was during this period that she developed an interest in the Baroque violin. After graduation, she supplemented her training by working with Nikolaus Harnoncourt in Salzburg.

In 1987 she was co-founder of the Freiburger Barockorchester, whose musical direction she shares with her colleague Gottfried von der Goltz. She also appears as soloist and chamber musician with the Freiburg Baroque Consort.

Petra Müllejans is Professor of Baroque Violin at the Hochschule für Musik Freiburg and at the Frankfurt University of Music and Performing Arts.

Müllejans also performs with a group called "Hot and Cool" in concerts and recordings of klezmer, tango, Czardas and jazz music.
