= Scaramuccia (surname) =

Scaramuccia is an Italian surname. Notable people with the surname include:

- Giovanni Antonio Scaramuccia (1580–1633), Italian painter
- Luigi Pellegrini Scaramuccia (1616–1680), Italian painter and biographer

== See also ==
- Scaramuccia (disambiguation)
- Scaramucci (surname)
