= Robert Hill (musician) =

American harpsichordist and fortepianist

Robert Stephen Hill (born November 6, 1953, in Cebu City, Philippines) is an American harpsichordist and fortepianist. From 1990 to 2018 he was "Professor of Historical Keyboard Instruments, Performance Practice and Chamber Music" at the Hochschule für Musik Freiburg, Germany, and he now serves as the “Eugene D. Eaton Jr. Chair in Baroque Music Performance” and teaches harpsichord at the University of Colorado Boulder College of Music, in the United States.

Robert Hill studied harpsichord with Gustav Leonhardt at the Amsterdam Conservatory (Soloist Diploma 1974). He completed his Ph.D. thesis about Bach at Harvard University in 1987.

Amongst the awards he has received are: Erwin Bodky Award (1982), a NEA Solo Recitalist Award (1983), and the Noah Greenberg Award (1988), Preis der deutschen Schallplattenkritik (2001), Cannes Classical Award (1999), Diapason d'Or (2008).

The works of Bach are central to his recorded repertoire. He has performed with numerous musicians including Reinhard Goebel, Gottfried von der Goltz, Dmitry Sitkovetsky, Christian Tetzlaff, Kim Kashkashian, Helmut Müller-Brühl, Nicholas McGegan, Thomas Zehetmair; and orchestras such as the Freiburg Baroque Orchestra, Cologne Chamber Orchestra, Northern Sinfonia, etc.

His brother is the instrument-builder Keith Hill.

== Writings ==
- Music and Performance During the Weimar Republic - Chapter 3: "Overcoming Romanticism": On the modernization of twentieth century performance practice
- About Bach - Carl Reinecke’s Performance of Mozart’s Larghetto and the Nineteenth-Century Practice of Quantitative Accentuation

== Recordings ==
- Naxos
- Hänssler Classic
- MDG (Musikproduktion Dabringhaus und Grimm)
- cpo
- DG-Archiv
- Olympia
- Ars Musici
- Music&Arts
