= List of compositions by Franz Krommer =

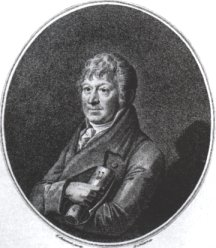
Franz Krommer

This is a list of compositions by Franz Krommer.

== Worklist by opus number ==
Compiled from Library of Congress records (of scores, parts or recordings. Note that some works by Krommer were published with the same Op. number.) also from WorldCat.

- Op. 1 – three string quartets (Offenbach s. M., André, about 1780)
- Op. 2 – three duos for two violins (in E♭, C and F) (1793?)
- Op. 3 – three quartets for strings (in C, A and D) (published around 1794 by André)
- Op. 4 – three quartets for strings (published in 1794 by André)
- Op. 5 – three quartets for strings (in E♭, F and B♭)
- Op. 6 – three duos for two violins (published by Pleyel about 1799)
- Op. 7 – three string quartets "concertans" (published by Andre about 1797)
- Op. 8 – six-string quintets
- Op. 9 – seven variations for violin solo
- Op. 9 – also the Op. number of a set of string quartets.
- Op. 10 – three string quartets
- Op. 11 – Trois quintetti : pour deux violons, deux altos & violoncelle (published by Andre in or before 1798). In F major, C minor and D major.
- Op. 12 – symphony no. 1 in F major (published about 1798 by Andre)
- Op. 13 – Quartet for flute, violin, viola, violoncello in D major. (c. 1797)
- Op. 14 – 13 variations for violin and bass
- Op. 15 – sonata in C for violin and basso continuo (published by Andre in 1799)
- Op. 16 – three string quartets (in E♭, F and C) (published Vienna: Artaria about 1800)
- Op. 17 – quartet for flute and strings in F
- Op. 18 – three string quartets (in D, A and E♭) (new edition Adliswil; Lottstetten : Edition Albert J. Kunzelmann, c 2000)
- Op. 18 – Concertino for flute, oboe, violin, horn and orchestra in C (an arrangement of String Quintet Op. 18 in C major)
- Op. 19 – three string quartets "concertans", in C, F and B♭.
- Op. 20 – three string quartets, in C, F and B♭ (composed jointly by Krommer and Barrière. Krommer composed three movements each of two of the quartets.)
- Op. 21 – quartets for clarinet and strings (no. 1 in B♭, no. 2 in E♭) (published by Andre in 1819.)
- Op. 22 – three duos concertants for violins (in A major, C, and F minor)
- Op. 23 – String quartet in G major (published by Simrock in Bonn in 1802)
- Op. 23 – Flute quartet in C (arrangement of above?)
- Op. 24 – three string quartets (published in Vienna)
- Op. 25 – six quintets for two violins, two violas and bass (nos. 1-3 in C, F and E♭)
- Op. 26 – string quartets (in C, F and A) (published by Simrock about 1801/2)
- Op. 27 – sonata for violin "with the accompaniment of a viola" in D
- Op. 29 – sonata for violin with the accompaniment of a viola in D
- Op. 30 – flute concerto no. 1 in G (2004 edition for flute and piano published Frankfurt (Main) : Zimmermann)
- Op. 30 also – quartet for flute, violin, viola and bass in C (published by Artaria in the 1810s)
- Op. 31 – Marches for woodwinds, two horns and trumpet.
- Op. 32 – Trio for piano, viola, and cello, in F
- Op. 33 – three duos for two violins, in B♭, E and A♭ (published by Andre about 1803)
- Op. 34 – three string quartets (in G major, D minor and B♭ major)
- Op. 34 (also) – "sonata" for piano, viola and cello in F
- Op. 35 – concerto for two clarinets in E♭
- Op. 35 – three violin duets.
- Op. 36 – clarinet concerto in E♭ (published by Offenbach s.m., André about 1803)
- Op. 37 – oboe concerto in F
- Op. 38 – "Concertino pour flute, hautbois et violon"
- Op. 39 – concertino for flute, oboe violin and orchestra in G
- Op. 40 – symphony no. 2 in D major
- Op. 42 – sonata for violin with the accompaniment of a viola
- Op. 43 – fourth violin concerto
- Op. 44 – fifth concerto for violin and orchestra in D (exists in flute concerto arrangement also published in 1830)
- Op. 45 – sonata for violin and cello in C (Canadian National Library) (See above)
- Op. 45 number 1 – Partitas, woodwinds, horns (2), trumpet in B♭ major.
- Op. 45 number 2 – Harmony (Partita) for 2 oboes, 2 clarinets, 2 horns, trumpet, 2 bassoons, and contrabassoon, in E♭ major.
- Op. 45 number 3 – Harmony (Partita) in B♭ major for 2 oboes, 2 clarinets, trumpet, 2 horns, 2 bassoons, and contrabassoon (all three Op. 45 re-published by Döblinger in 1999.)
- Op. 46 number 1 – Quartet in B♭ for bassoon, two violas and cello.
- Op. 46 number 2 – Quartet in E♭ for bassoon, two violas and cello.
- Op. 47 – thirteen pieces for two clarinets and viola (or three clarinets)
- Op. 48 – string quartets (in E♭, C and D)
- Op. 49 – quintet in D for flute, violin, two violas, and cello (published by Bureau d'Arts et d'Industrie, Vienna, 1800s) (in the NKC library in the Czech republic. Recorded on the label Edit, 1996.)
- Op. 50 – string quartets in F major, B♭ and A (the manuscript of no. 3 in A major is in the Pierpont Morgan Library)
- Op. 51 – duets for violins (c. 1809) (Canadian National Library)
- Op. 52 – oboe concerto in F
- Op. 52 – clarinet concerto
- Op. 53 – three string quartets, in E♭, A and C (early publication 1804. Vienna: Cappi)
- Op. 54 – duos for two violins
- Op. 54 – also the Op. number of three string quartets, in F, D and B♭ (published in 1805)
- Op. 55 – quintet (2nd flute quintet) for flute, violin, 2 violas and cello in E minor (possibly written 1797)
- Op. 56 – three string quartets, in B♭, D and G
- Op. 57 – harmony (octet-partita) for winds in F
- Op. 58 – quintet (3rd flute quintet) in C for flute, violin, two violas, and cello
- Op. 59 – variations (quartet in G) on a Bohemian folksong for flute, violin, viola and cello
- Op. 61 – violin concerto in D minor.
- Op. 62 – symphony no. 3 in D major (1807) (about to be republished, 2006, by Ries & Erler. The old André edition is at the Library of Congress – Grande sinfonie pour 2 violons, flûte, 2 haut-bois, 2 clarinettes, 2 bassons, 2 cors, 2 trompettes, timbales, alto & basse...)
- Op. 63 – quintet in C for flute and strings (flute, violin, two violas, and cello) (published by Sieber in Paris, between 1799 and 1813, republished in 2000.)
- Op. 64 – three string quartets (published by Pleyel 1803 or 1804)
- Op. 65 – concertino for flute, oboe and orchestra in C
- Op. 66 – quintet in E♭ for flute (or violin), violin, two violas, and cello (c. 1809) (Vienna: magasin de l'imprimerie chimique)
- Op. 67 – octet-partita in B♭
- Op. 68 – three string quartets in F minor, C major and A (about 1809) (Vienna: magasin de l'imprimerie chimique)
- Op. 69 – "harmonie" (for wind-ensemble) for 2 oboes, 2 clarinets, 2 bassoons, horn and contrabassoon in E♭
- Op. 69 – also the Op. no. of a quartet for clarinet, violin, viola and cello in E♭ (written about 1808) (published in Bonn: Simrock, also about 1808)
- Op. 70 – sinfonia concertante for violin, flute, clarinet and orchestra in E♭
- Op. 70 also – string quintet in E♭ (2 violins, 2 violas, cello)
- Op. 71 – partita for winds in E♭
- Op. 72 – string quartets in C, E and A♭ (published c. 1810) (Vienna: magasin de l'imprimerie chimique) (nos. 1 in C and 3 in A♭ published by Theo Wyatt in their Merton Music series in 1996.)
- Op. 73 – partita for winds in F
- Op. 74 – three string quartets in B♭, G and in D minor (published c. 1810) (Vienna: magasin de l'imprimerie chimique)
- Op. 75 – quartet for flute, violin, viola and cello in D
- Op. 76 – partita for winds in C
- Op. 77 – partita for winds in F
- Op. 78 – partita for winds in B♭
- Op. 79 – octet-partita/nonet for 2 oboes, 2 clarinets, 2 horns, 2 bassoons, and contrabassoon in E♭
- Op. 80 – sinfonia concertante for flute, clarinet violin and orchestra in D
- Op. 80 may also be the proper Op. number of the quartets presently listed under Op. 90.
- Op. 80 also is the number assigned to a string quintet
- Op. 81 – violin concerto
- Op. 82 – quartet for clarinet, violin, viola and cello in D. (published by Andre possibly around 1814.)
- Op. 83 – harmonie for winds in F
- Op. 83 – quartet for clarinet and strings in B♭ (published by Andre around 1816.)
- Op. 84 – piano trio no. 1 for piano, violin and cello in E♭ major (Vienna: magasin de l'imprimerie chimique, around 1810)
- Op. 85 – three string quartets in F, B♭ and D (Netherlands Library record gives 1809 for date of publication. No. 1 in F has been republished in the Merton Music series.)
- Op. 86 – concerto for flute and orchestra in E minor (arranged by Joseph Küffner into a clarinet concerto)
- Op. 87 – piano trio no. 2 for piano, violin and cello in F major (Vienna: Steiner. Published in 1811)
- Op. 88 – three (?) quintets for strings (published c. 1810) (Vienna: magasin de l'imprimerie chimique) (number 1 is in E♭, number 2 is in D minor, no. 3 is in C)
- Op. 89 – Grand quatuor pour flute, violin, alto, violoncello in F (Offenbach : Chez J. Andre, 1816?)
- Op. 90 – quartet for clarinet and strings in C major (1820)
- Op. 90 – also the Op. number of three string quartets, in E♭, C and B♭ (c. 1813) (Vienna: magasin de l'imprimerie chimique)
- Op. 91 – quintet for flute and strings in D major
- Op. 91 also – concerto in E♭ for two clarinets and orchestra
- Op. 92 – quartet for flute and strings in G (also National Library of Canada)
- Op. 92 – also string quartets (date of publication 1816) (other catalog entries at the same site list the three Op. 92 quartets as being in D, B♭ and G major respectively. Published by Ricordi in Milan.)
- Op. 92 – (also Op. 94?) also a quintet for flute and strings in D minor (published by Haslinger around 1820)
- Op. 93 – quartet for flute and strings in D (published by André in 1819)
- Op. 94 – quartet in C for flute and strings
- Op. 94 – also Duets for violins (Canadian National Library)
- Op. 95 – quartet for piano and strings in E♭ (published 1817)
- Op. 95 – also quintet for clarinet, violin, two violas, and cello in B♭ major (1817)
- Op. 96 – divertimento for string trio in F, 1818. (recorded in 1999)
- Op. 96 – also used for a quartet for flute and strings in C, published by André around 1819
- Op. 97 – quartet for flute, violin, viola and violoncello in D (Offenbach s/M, Andre, about 1800?)
- Op. 98 – quartet for flute and string trio in G
- Op. 99 – three string quartets, in D major, B minor and G major
- Op. 100 – string quintets in B♭ major, D minor, G (pub. c. 1820)
- Op. 101 – quintet (no. 6) for flute and strings (published by Haslinger around 1790)
- Op. 102 – symphony no. 4.
- Op. 103 – three string quartets, in G major, C major and A minor (Vienna: Steiner around 1821)
- Op. 104 – Flute quintet "number 7", flute, violin, violas, violoncello in E♭ major. (published by Steiner in Vienna.)
- Op. 105 – symphony no. 5 in E♭ (published 1815 by Andre in Offenbach on Mayn)
- Op. 106 – three string quintets, in F, E♭ and C
- Op. 107 – three string quintets (2 violins, 2 violas, violoncello) (in C, A and E♭) (Offenbach s/M, Andre, about 1825)
- Op. 108 – Mass in C for four solo singers, two violins, violas, flute, oboes, 2 clarinets, 2 bassoons, 2 horns, 2 trumpets, drums, cello, contraltos and organ. (published in 1824)
- Op. 109 – quintet no. 8 in G for flute, violin, 2 violas and cello (published in the 1820s. Wien, Tobias Haslinger)
- Op. 110 – Three duets for violins (in A minor, E major and C major)

without opus number:

- partita in C minor for 2 clarinets, 2 horns and 2 bassoons
- often referred to as "Ben 338" : trio in F for two oboes and English horn, variations on a theme by Pleyel
- violin concerto in F (edited from a ms. in the Archiepiscopal Archive in Kroměříž, according to the Kunzelmann edition.)
- Mass in D (published Firenze : Presso Ferdinando Lorenzi, 1842)
- A string trio in D major published in 1993 (by Metronome Edition, Prague)
- symphony 6 in D
- symphony 7 in G minor
- symphony 8 (lost)
- symphony 9 in C

"Ben" refers to the cataloging work done on Ignaz Pleyel and Krommer's work by Rita Benton.

== Complete worklist ==
List compiled by Karel Padrta.

=== Symphonies ===
- P I:1 – Symphony No. 1 in F major, Op. 12
- P I:2 – Symphony No. 2 in D major, Op. 40 (1803)
- P I:3 – Symphony No. 3 in D major, Op. 62
- P I:4 – Symphony No. 4 in C minor, Op. 102 (1819–20)
- P I:5 – Symphony No. 5 in E♭ major, Op. 105 (1821)
- P I:6 – Symphony No. 6 in D major (1823)
- P I:7 – Symphony No. 7 in G minor (1824)
- P I:8 – Symphony No. 8 (unknown)
- P I:9 – Symphony No. 9 in C major (1830)
- P I:C1 – Sinfonia Pastorallis in C major
- P I:D1 – Symphony in D major
- P I:D2 – Sinfonia Pastorallis in D major (lost)

=== Concertos ===
- P II:1 – Concertino Op. 18 for flute, oboe & violin in C major
- P II:2 – Concertino Op. 38 for flute, oboe & violin in F major
- P II:3 – Concertino Op. 39 for flute, oboe & violin in G major
- P II:4 – Concertino Op. 65 for flute & oboe in C major
- P II:5 – Concertino Op. 70 for flute, clarinet & violin in E♭ major
- P II:6 – Concertino Op. 80 for flute, clarinet & violin in D major
- P III: 1 – Violin Concerto Op. 20 in A major
- P III: 2 – Flute Concerto Op. 30 in G major
- P III: 3 – Concerto for 2 clarinets Op. 35 in E♭ major
- P III: 4 – Clarinet Concerto Op. 36 in E♭ major
- P III: 5 – Oboe Concerto Op. 37 in F major
- P III: 6 – Violin Concerto Op. 41 in B♭ major
- P III: 7 – Violin Concerto Op. 42 in E major
- P III: 8 – Violin Concerto Op. 43 in F major
- P III: 9 – Violin Concerto Op. 44 in D major
- P III:10 – Flute Concerto Op. 44 in D major
- P III:11 – Oboe Concerto Op. 52 in F major
- P III:12 – Clarinet Concerto Op. 52 in E♭ major
- P III:13 – Violin Concerto Op. 61 in D minor
- P III:14 – Violin Concerto Op. 64 in D major
- P III:15 – Violin Concerto Op. 81 in E minor
- P III:16 – Flute Concerto Op. 86 in E minor
- P III:17 – Clarinet Concerto Op. 86 in E minor
- P III:18 – Concerto for 2 clarinets Op. 91 in E♭ major
- P III:C1 – Violin Concerto in C major
- P III:d1 – Flute Concerto in D minor
- P III:Es1 – Clarinet Concertino in E♭ major
- P III:F1 – Violin Concerto in F major
- P III:F2 – Violin Concerto in F major
- P III:G1 – Violin Concerto in G major

=== Compositions for wind ensemble ===
- P IV: 1 – Partita Op. 45 No. 1 in B♭ major
- P IV: 2 – Partita Op. 45 No. 2 in E♭ major
- P IV: 3 – Partita Op. 45 No. 3 in B♭ major
- P IV: 4 – Partita Op. 57 in F major
- P IV: 5 – Partita Op. 67 in B♭ major
- P IV: 6 – Partita Op. 69 in E♭ major
- P IV: 7 – Partita Op. 71 in E♭ major
- P IV: 8 – Partita Op. 73 in F major
- P IV: 9 – Partita Op. 76 in C major
- P IV:10 – Partita Op. 77 in F major
- P IV:11 – Partita Op. 78 in B♭ major
- P IV:12 – Partita Op. 79 in E♭ major
- P IV:13 – Partita Op. 83 in F major
- P IV:14 – Partita in C minor
- P IV:15 – Partita in E♭ major "La Chasse"
- P IV:16 – Serenade No. 7 in E♭ major
- P IV:17 – Serenade No. 3 in E♭ major
- P IV:18 – Partita in E♭ major (P IV:18)
- P IV:19 – Partita in E♭ major (P IV:19)
- P IV:20 – Serenade No. 1 in E♭ major
- P IV:21 – Parthia No. 2 in E♭ major
- P IV:22 – Partita in E♭ major (P IV:22)
- P IV:23 – Partita in E♭ major (P IV:23)
- P IV:24 – Partita in E♭ major (P IV:24)
- P IV:25 – Serenade No. 5 in E♭ major
- P IV:26 – Serenade No. 6 in E♭ major
- P IV:27 – Partita in E♭ major (P IV:27)
- P IV:28 – Variations for wind sextet in E♭ major
- P IV:29 – Symphony for winds in F major
- P IV:30 – Partita in B♭ major (P IV:30)
- P IV:31 – Partita in B♭ major (P IV:31)
- P IV:32 – Partita in B♭ major (P IV:32)
- P IV:33 – Serenade No. 4 in B♭ major
- P IV:34 – Parthia No. 1 in B♭ major
- P IV:35 – Parthia No. 3 in B♭ major
- P IV:36 – Parthia No. 4 in B♭ major
- P IV:37 – Parthia No. 5 in B♭ major
- P IV:38 – Parthia No. 6 in B♭ major
- P IV:39 – Parthia No. 8 in B♭ major
- P IV:40 – Parthia No. 7 in B♭ major
- P IV:41 – Partita in B♭ major (P IV:41)
- P IV:42 – Partita in B♭ major (P IV:42)
- P IV:43 – Partita in B♭ major (P IV:43)
- P IV:44 – Serenade No. 8 in B♭ major
- P IV:Es1 – Partita in E♭ major "Corni soli"
- P IV:Es2 – Sestetto pastorale in E♭ major
- P IV:Es3 – Serenade II in E♭ major
- P IV:Es4 – Serenade III in E♭ major
- P IV:Es5 – Serenade IV in E♭ major
- P IV:Es6 – Partita in E♭ major (P IV:Es6)
- P IV:F1 – Partita in F major

=== Marches & Dances ===
- P V: 1 – Marches Op. 31
- P V: 2 – Marches Op. 60
- P V: 3 – March Op. 82 (lost)
- P V: 4 – Marches Op. 97 (lost)
- P V: 5 – Marches Op. 98
- P V: 6 – Marches Op. 99 (lost)
- P V: 7 – March Op. 100 in F major
- P V: 8 – Marches (P V: 8)
- P V: 9 – March "Gott erhalte Franz der Kaiser" in E♭ major
- P V:10 – Marches (P V:10)
- P V:B1 – Ländler for winds
- P V:C1 – Marches (P V:C1)

=== String Quintets ===
- P VI: 1 – String Quintet Op. 8 No. 1 in B♭ major
- P VI: 2 – String Quintet Op. 8 No. 2 in E♭ major
- P VI: 3 – String Quintet Op. 8 No. 3 in G major
- P VI: 4 – String Quintet Op. 11 No. 1 in F major
- P VI: 5 – String Quintet Op. 11 No. 2 in C minor
- P VI: 6 – String Quintet Op. 11 No. 3 in D major
- P VI: 7 – String Quintet Op. 18 in C major
- P VI: 8 – String Quintet Op. 25 No. 1 in C major
- P VI: 9 – String Quintet Op. 25 No. 2 in F major
- P VI:10 – String Quintet Op. 25 No. 3 in E♭ major
- P VI:11 – String Quintet Op. 25 No. 4 in A major
- P VI:12 – String Quintet Op. 25 No. 5 in F minor
- P VI:13 – String Quintet Op. 25 No. 6 in B♭ major
- P VI:14 – String Quintet Op. 62 in D major
- P VI:15 – String Quintet Op. 70 in E♭ major
- P VI:16 – String Quintet Op. 80 in D major
- P VI:17 – String Quintet Op. 88 No. 1 in E♭ major
- P VI:18 – String Quintet Op. 88 No. 2 in D minor
- P VI:19 – String Quintet Op. 88 No. 3 in C major
- P VI:20 – String Quintet Op. 100 No. 1 in B♭ major
- P VI:21 – String Quintet Op. 100 No. 2 in D minor
- P VI:22 – String Quintet Op. 100 No. 3 in G major
- P VI:23 – String Quintet Op. 102 in C minor
- P VI:24 – String Quintet Op. 106 No. 1 in F major
- P VI:25 – String Quintet Op. 106 No. 2 in E♭ major
- P VI:26 – String Quintet Op. 106 No. 3 in C major
- P VI:27 – String Quintet Op. 107 No. 1 in C major
- P VI:28 – String Quintet Op. 107 No. 2 in A major
- P VI:29 – String Quintet Op. 107 No. 3 in E♭ major
- P VI:30 – String Quintet in D major "La Chasse"
- P VI:31 – String Quintet in E♭ major
- P VI:32 – String Quintet in E♭ major
- P VI:33 – String Quintet in E♭ major
- P VI:34 – String Quintet in G major
- P VI:35 – String Quintet in B♭ major

=== Quintets with a wind instrument ===
- P VII: 1 – Flute Quintet Op. 25 in C major
- P VII: 2 – Flute Quintet Op. 49 in D major
- P VII: 3 – Flute Quintet Op. 55 in E minor
- P VII: 4 – Flute Quintet Op. 58 in C major
- P VII: 5 – Flute Quintet Op. 63 in C major
- P VII: 6 – Flute Quintet Op. 66 in E♭ major
- P VII: 7 – Flute Quintet Op. 92 in D minor
- P VII: 8 – Clarinet Quintet Op. 95 in B♭ major
- P VII: 9 – Flute Quintet Op. 101 in G major
- P VII:10 – Flute Quintet Op. 104 in E♭ major
- P VII:11 – Flute Quintet Op. 109 in G major
- P VII:12 – Oboe Quintet in C major
- P VII:13 – Oboe Quintet in E♭ major
- P VII:14 – Flute Quintet in G major
- P VII:15 – Oboe Quintet in E♭ major (Rosinack)
- P VII:16 – Oboe Quintet in B♭ major (Rosinack)
- P VII:17 – Alla polacca for flute quintet in F major

=== String Quartets ===
- P VIII: 1 – String Quartet Op. 1 No. 1 in B♭ major
- P VIII: 2 – String Quartet Op. 1 No. 2 in G major
- P VIII: 3 – String Quartet Op. 1 No. 3 in E♭ major
- P VIII: 4 – String Quartet Op. 3 No. 1 in C major
- P VIII: 5 – String Quartet Op. 3 No. 2 in A major
- P VIII: 6 – String Quartet Op. 3 No. 3 in D major
- P VIII: 7 – String Quartet Op. 4 No. 1 in G major
- P VIII: 8 – String Quartet Op. 4 No. 2 in E♭ major
- P VIII: 9 – String Quartet Op. 4 No. 3 in B♭ major
- P VIII:10 – String Quartet Op. 5 No. 1 in E♭ major
- P VIII:11 – String Quartet Op. 5 No. 2 in F major
- P VIII:12 – String Quartet Op. 5 No. 3 in B♭ major
- P VIII:13 – String Quartet Op. 7 No. 1 in C major
- P VIII:14 – String Quartet Op. 7 No. 2 in E minor
- P VIII:15 – String Quartet Op. 7 No. 3 in A major
- P VIII:16 – String Quartet Op. 10 No. 1 in F major
- P VIII:17 – String Quartet Op. 10 No. 2 in B♭ major
- P VIII:18 – String Quartet Op. 10 No. 3 in G major
- P VIII:19 – String Quartet Op. 16 No. 1 in E♭ major
- P VIII:20 – String Quartet Op. 16 No. 2 in F major
- P VIII:21 – String Quartet Op. 16 No. 3 in C major
- P VIII:22 – String Quartet Op. 18 No. 1 in D major
- P VIII:23 – String Quartet Op. 18 No. 2 in A major
- P VIII:24 – String Quartet Op. 18 No. 3 in E♭ major
- P VIII:25 – String Quartet Op. 19 No. 1 in C major
- P VIII:26 – String Quartet Op. 19 No. 2 in F major
- P VIII:27 – String Quartet Op. 19 No. 3 in B♭ major
- P VIII:28 – String Quartet Op. 21 in E♭ major
- P VIII:29 – String Quartet Op. 23 in G major
- P VIII:30 – String Quartet Op. 24 No. 1 in D major
- P VIII:31 – String Quartet Op. 24 No. 2 in E♭ major
- P VIII:32 – String Quartet Op. 24 No. 3 in G minor
- P VIII:33 – String Quartet Op. 26 No. 1 in C major
- P VIII:34 – String Quartet Op. 26 No. 2 in F major
- P VIII:35 – String Quartet Op. 26 No. 3 in A major
- P VIII:36 – String Quartet Op. 34 No. 1 in G major
- P VIII:37 – String Quartet Op. 34 No. 2 in D minor
- P VIII:38 – String Quartet Op. 34 No. 3 in B♭ major
- P VIII:39 – String Quartet Op. 48 No. 1 in E♭ major
- P VIII:40 – String Quartet Op. 48 No. 2 in C major
- P VIII:41 – String Quartet Op. 48 No. 3 in D major
- P VIII:42 – String Quartet Op. 50 No. 1 in F major
- P VIII:43 – String Quartet Op. 50 No. 2 in B♭ major
- P VIII:44 – String Quartet Op. 50 No. 3 in A major
- P VIII:45 – String Quartet Op. 53 No. 1 in E♭ major
- P VIII:46 – String Quartet Op. 53 No. 2 in A major
- P VIII:47 – String Quartet Op. 53 No. 3 in C major
- P VIII:48 – String Quartet Op. 54 No. 1 in F major
- P VIII:49 – String Quartet Op. 54 No. 2 in D major
- P VIII:50 – String Quartet Op. 54 No. 3 in B♭ major
- P VIII:51 – String Quartet Op. 56 No. 1 in B♭ major
- P VIII:52 – String Quartet Op. 56 No. 2 in D major
- P VIII:53 – String Quartet Op. 56 No. 3 in G major
- P VIII:54 – String Quartet Op. 68 No. 1 in F minor
- P VIII:55 – String Quartet Op. 68 No. 2 in C major
- P VIII:56 – String Quartet Op. 68 No. 3 in A major
- P VIII:57 – String Quartet Op. 72 No. 1 in C major
- P VIII:58 – String Quartet Op. 72 No. 2 in E major
- P VIII:59 – String Quartet Op. 72 No. 3 in A♭ major
- P VIII:60 – String Quartet Op. 74 No. 1 in B♭ major
- P VIII:61 – String Quartet Op. 74 No. 2 in G major
- P VIII:62 – String Quartet Op. 74 No. 3 in D minor
- P VIII:63 – String Quartet Op. 85 No. 1 in F major
- P VIII:64 – String Quartet Op. 85 No. 2 in B♭ major
- P VIII:65 – String Quartet Op. 85 No. 3 in D major
- P VIII:66 – 3 Hungarian Dances Op. 89
- P VIII:67 – String Quartet Op. 90 No. 1 in E♭ major
- P VIII:68 – String Quartet Op. 90 No. 2 in C major
- P VIII:69 – String Quartet Op. 90 No. 3 in B♭ major
- P VIII:70 – String Quartet Op. 92 No. 1 in D major
- P VIII:71 – String Quartet Op. 92 No. 2 in B♭ major
- P VIII:72 – String Quartet Op. 92 No. 3 in G major
- P VIII:73 – String Quartet op103 No. 1 in E minor
- P VIII:74 – String Quartet op103 No. 2 in C major
- P VIII:75 – String Quartet op103 No. 3 in A minor
- P VIII:76 – 12 Walzes for String Quartet
- P VIII:77 – Allegretto for string quartet in A major
- P VIII:78 – String Quartet in C major
- P VIII:F1 – String Quartet in F major

=== Quartets with a wind/keyboard instrument ===
- P IX: 1 – Flute Quartet Op. 13 in D major
- P IX: 2 – Flute Quartet Op. 17 in F major
- P IX: 3 – Clarinet Quartet Op. 21 No. 2 in E♭ major
- P IX: 4 – Clarinet Quartet Op. 21 No. 1 in B♭ major
- P IX: 5 – Clarinet Quartet Op. 69 in E♭ major
- P IX: 6 – Flute Quartet Op. 23 in G major
- P IX: 7 – Flute Quartet Op. 30 in C major
- P IX: 8 – Bassoon Quartet Op. 46 No. 1 in B♭ major
- P IX: 9 – Bassoon Quartet Op. 46 No. 2 in E♭ major
- P IX:10 – Variations for flute quartet on "O, du lieber Augustin" Op. 59 in D major
- P IX:11 – Flute Quartet Op. 75 in D major
- P IX:12 – Clarinet Quartet Op. 82 in D major
- P IX:13 – Clarinet Quartet Op. 83 in B♭ major
- P IX:14 – Flute Quartet Op. 89 in F major
- P IX:15 – Flute Quartet Op. 90 in C major
- P IX:16 – Flute Quartet Op. 92 in G major
- P IX:17 – Flute Quartet Op. 93 in D major
- P IX:18 – Flute Quartet Op. 94 in C major
- P IX:19 – Flute Quartet Op. 97 in D major
- P IX:20 – Flute Quartet in C major
- P IX:21 – Oboe Quartet in C major
- P IX:22 – Oboe Quartet in F major
- P IX:B1 – Clarinet Quartet in B♭ major
- P IX:D1 – Variations for flute quartet in D major
- P IX:e1 – Flute Quartet in E minor
- P X:1 – Piano Quartet Op. 95 in E♭ major

=== Trio Sonatas ===
- P XI:1 – String Trio Op. 96 in F major
- P XI:D1 – Variations for string trio in D major
- P XII:1 – 13 Pieces for 2 clarinets & viola Op. 47
- P XII:2 – Sonata for 2 oboes & English horn in F major
- P XII:3 – Variations for 2 oboes & English horn in F major
- P XIII:1 – Piano Trio Op. 32 in F major
- P XIII:2 – Piano Trio Op. 84 in E♭ major
- P XIII:3 – Piano Trio Op. 87 in F major

=== Duo Sonatas ===
- P XIV: 1 – Duet for violins Op. 2 No. 1 in E♭ major
- P XIV: 2 – Duet for violins Op. 2 No. 2 in C major
- P XIV: 3 – Duet for violins Op. 2 No. 3 in F major
- P XIV: 4 – Duet for violins Op. 6 No. 1 in E♭ major
- P XIV: 5 – Duet for violins Op. 6 No. 2 in G major
- P XIV: 6 – Duet for violins Op. 6 No. 3 in B♭ major
- P XIV: 7 – Duet for violins Op. 22 No. 1 in A major
- P XIV: 8 – Duet for violins Op. 22 No. 2 in C major
- P XIV: 9 – Duet for violins Op. 22 No. 3 in F minor
- P XIV:10 – Duet for violins Op. 33 No. 1 in B♭ major
- P XIV:11 – Duet for violins Op. 33 No. 2 in E major
- P XIV:12 – Duet for violins Op. 33 No. 3 in A♭ major
- P XIV:13 – Duet for violins Op. 51 No. 1 in D major
- P XIV:14 – Duet for violins Op. 51 No. 2 in F major
- P XIV:15 – Duet for violins Op. 51 No. 3 in E♭ major
- P XIV:16 – Duet for violins Op. 54 No. 1 in A major
- P XIV:17 – Duet for violins Op. 54 No. 2 in F major
- P XIV:18 – Duet for violins Op. 54 No. 3 in E♭ major
- P XIV:19 – Duet for violins Op. 94 No. 1 in G minor
- P XIV:20 – Duet for violins Op. 94 No. 2 in C major
- P XIV:21 – Duet for violins Op. 94 No. 3 in A major
- P XIV:22 – Duet for violins op110 No. 1 in A minor
- P XIV:23 – Duet for violins op110 No. 2 in E major
- P XIV:24 – Duet for violins op110 No. 3 in C major
- P XIV:A1 – Duet for violins in A major
- P XIV:B1 – Duet for violins in B♭ major (P XIV:B1)
- P XIV:B2 – Duet for violins in B♭ major (P XIV:B2)
- P XIV:C1 – Duet for violins in C major
- P XIV:D1 – Duet for violins in D major (P XIV:D1)
- P XIV:D2 – Duet for violins in D major (P XIV:D2)
- P XIV:E1 – Duet for violins in E major
- P XIV:F1 – Duet for violins in F major (P XIV:F1)
- P XIV:F2 – Duet for violins in F major (P XIV:F2)
- P XIV:G1 – Duet for violins in G major
- P XV: 1 – Duet for flutes Op. 2 No. 1 in G major
- P XV: 2 – Duet for flutes Op. 2 No. 2 in D major
- P XV: 3 – Duet for flutes Op. 2 No. 3 in C major
- P XV: 4 – Duet for flutes Op. 6 No. 1 in D major
- P XV: 5 – Duet for flutes Op. 6 No. 2 in C major
- P XV: 6 – Duet for flutes Op. 6 No. 3 in G major
- P XV: 7 – Duet for flutes Op. 22 No. 1 in A major
- P XV: 8 – Duet for flutes Op. 22 No. 2 in D major
- P XV: 9 – Duet for flutes Op. 22 No. 3 in G minor
- P XV:10 – Duet for flutes Op. 33 No. 1 in D major
- P XV:11 – Duet for flutes Op. 33 No. 2 in F major
- P XV:12 – Duet for flutes Op. 33 No. 3 in B♭ major
- P XV:13 – Duet for flutes Op. 51 No. 1 in D major
- P XV:14 – Duet for flutes Op. 51 No. 2 in F major
- P XV:15 – Duet for flutes Op. 51 No. 3 in C major
- P XV:16 – Duet for flutes Op. 54 No. 1 in G major
- P XV:17 – Duet for flutes Op. 54 No. 2 in D major
- P XV:18 – Duet for flutes Op. 54 No. 3 in G major
- P XV:19 – Duettino for flutes Book I No. 1 in C major
- P XV:20 – Duettino for flutes Book I No. 2 in D major
- P XV:21 – Duettino for flutes Book I No. 3 in C major
- P XV:22 – Duettino for flutes Book I No. 4 in C major
- P XV:23 – Duettino for flutes Book I No. 5 in D major
- P XV:24 – Duettino for flutes Book I No. 6 in G major
- P XV:25 – Duettino for flutes Book II No. 1 in G major
- P XV:26 – Duettino for flutes Book II No. 2 in A major
- P XV:27 – Duettino for flutes Book II No. 3 in C major
- P XV:28 – Duettino for flutes Book II No. 4 in G major
- P XV:29 – Duettino for flutes Book II No. 5 in G major
- P XV:30 – Duettino for flutes Book II No. 6 in A major

=== Violin Sonatas ===
- P XVI:1 – Variations for violin & bass Op. 9 in E♭ major
- P XVI:2 – Variations for violin & bass Op. 14 in B♭ major
- P XVI:3 – Violin Sonata Op. 15 in C major
- P XVI:4 – Sonata for violin & viola Op. 27 in D major
- P XVI:5 – Sonata for violin & viola Op. 29 in A major
- P XVI:6 – Variations for violin Op. 41 (lost)
- P XVI:7 – Sonata for violin & viola Op. 45 (lost)
- P XVI:B1 – Variations for violin & bass in B♭ major
- P XVI:C1 – Variations for violin in C major

=== Keyboard works ===
- P XVII: 1 – Sonatina for piano & violin Book I No. 1 in G major
- P XVII: 2 – Sonatina for piano & violin Book I No. 2 in B♭ major
- P XVII: 3 – Sonatina for piano & violin Book I No. 3 in C major
- P XVII: 4 – Sonatina for piano & violin Book I No. 4 in D minor
- P XVII: 5 – Sonatina for piano & violin Book I No. 5 in E♭ major
- P XVII: 6 – Sonatina for piano & violin Book I No. 6 in A♭ major
- P XVII: 7 – Sonatina for piano & violin Book II No. 1 in G minor
- P XVII: 8 – Sonatina for piano & violin Book II No. 2 in C major
- P XVII: 9 – Sonatina for piano & violin Book II No. 3 in D major
- P XVII:10 – Sonatina for piano & violin Book II No. 4 in E♭ major
- P XVII:11 – Sonatina for piano & violin Book II No. 5 in E♭ major
- P XVII:12 – Sonatina for piano & violin Book II No. 6 in B♭ major
- P XVII:13 – Sonatina for piano & violin Book III No. 1 in F major
- P XVII:14 – Sonatina for piano & violin Book III No. 2 in A major
- P XVII:15 – Sonatina for piano & violin Book III No. 3 in C major
- P XVII:16 – Sonatina for piano & violin Book III No. 4 in B♭ major
- P XVII:17 – Sonatina for piano & violin Book III No. 5 in G major
- P XVII:18 – Sonatina for piano & violin Book III No. 6 in D major
- P XVII:19 – Polonaise favorite for piano & violin in F major
- P XVIII: 1 – Marches for piano Op. 31
- P XVIII: 2 – 6 Waltzes for piano Op. 94
- P XVIII: 3 – Bürgermarsch for piano (lost)
- P XVIII: 4 – Marches for piano
- P XVIII: 5 – Sonata for piano 4 hands in C major
- P XVIII: 6 – Sonata for piano 4 hands in G major
- P XVIII: 7 – Sonata for piano 4 hands in D major
- P XVIII: 8 – 2 Märsche der Niederösterreichischen Landeswehr for piano (lost)
- P XVIII: 9 – Polonaise favorite de Varsovie for piano in G major
- P XVIII:10 – Polonaise favorite for piano in F major
- P XVIII:11 – Symphony Op. 40 for piano 4 hands in D major
- P XVIII:12 – Trauermarsch for piano in B♭ minor
- P XVIII:13 – Menuet for piano in C major
- P XVIII:14 – Menuet for piano in F major
- P XVIII:15 – Rondo for piano in E♭ major
- P XVIII:16 – Menuet for piano in D major
- P XVIII:17 – Hungarian dance for piano in F minor
- P XVIII:18 – Andante for piano 4 hands in C major
- P XVIII:19 – 12 German dances for harpsichord
- P XVIII:20 – Quartet for harpsichord duet in C major
- P XVIII:21 – Quartet for harpsichord duet in E minor
- P XVIII:22 – Quartet for harpsichord duet in A major
- P XVIII:G1 – Allegro for piano 4 hands in G major

=== Sacred works ===
- P XIX:1 – Mass Op. 108 in C major
- P XIX:2 – Mass in D minor
- P XIX:3 – Mass in C major (P XIX:3)
- P XIX:4 – Mass in C major (P XIX:4)
- P XX:1 – Pange lingua in D major
- P XX:2 – Pange lingua in E♭ major
- P XX:3 – Pange lingua in B♭ major
- P XX:4 – Offerimus tibi in D major
