= Freiburger Barockorchester =

German orchestra

- Orchestra
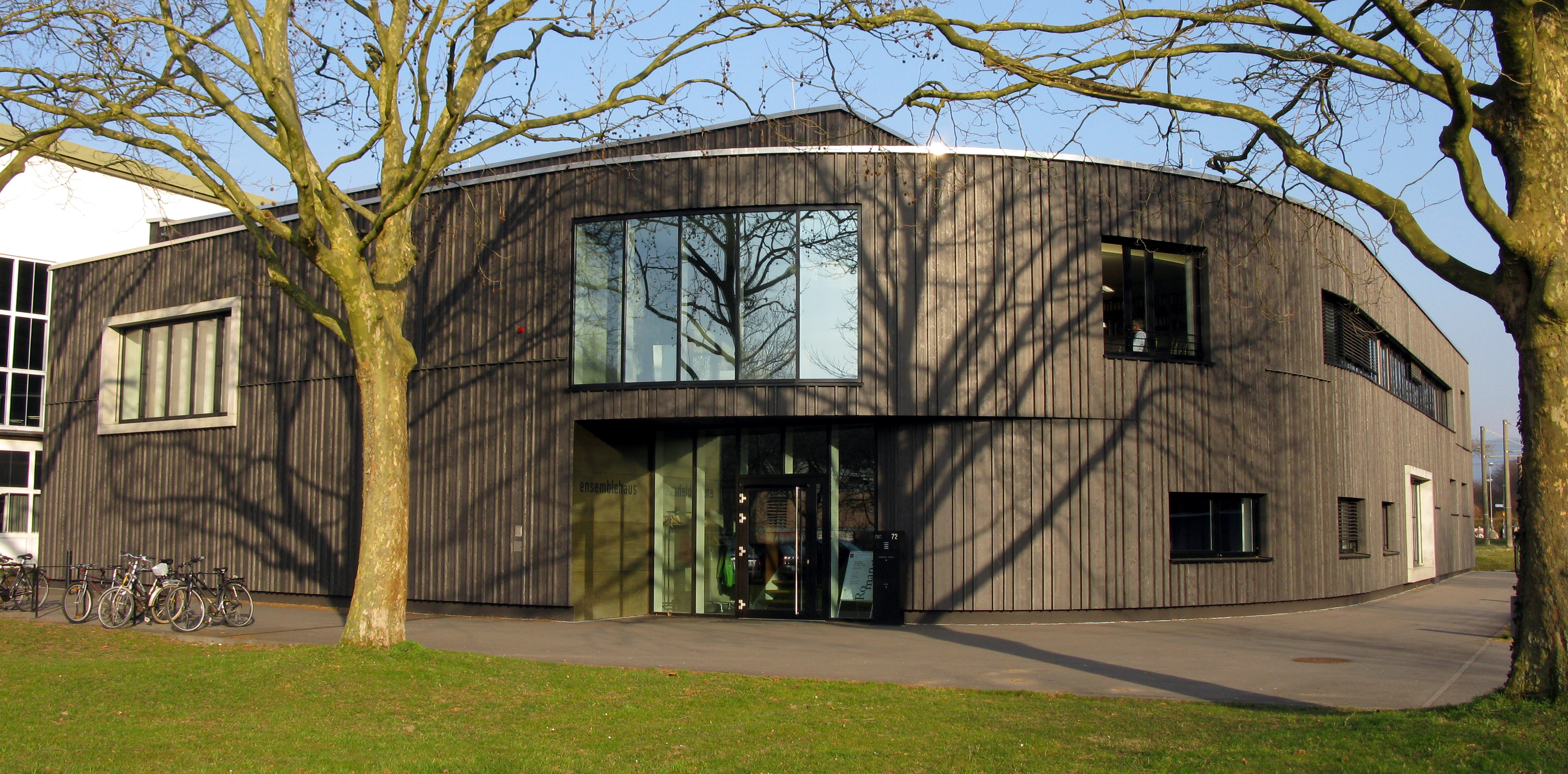
- The ensemble-house of the Freiburger Barockorchester
- Founded: 1987
- Location: Freiburg im Breisgau
- Website: https://www.barockorchester.de

Freiburger Barockorchester (Freiburg Baroque Orchestra) is a German Baroque orchestra founded in 1987, with the mission statement: "to enliven the world of Baroque music with new sounds".

== History ==
The orchestra is based in Freiburg im Breisgau. In addition to Baroque music, it has performed works by composers such as Beethoven, Schubert and Weber, and contemporary music.

The orchestra gave its first concert in 1987 and began touring abroad with a performance in Amsterdam in 1989. The first tour to America in 1995. Violinists Gottfried von der Goltz and Petra Müllejans from among their own numbers are the regular musical directors. The orchestra performs a quarter of its concerts with guest conductors such as Ivor Bolton, René Jacobs, Philippe Herreweghe, Pablo Heras-Casado and Trevor Pinnock.

== Awards ==
The Freiburger Barockorchester was awarded the 2012 Echo Klassik Awards as "Ensemble of the Year (Historical Instruments)".

== Selected discography ==
- Wilhelm Friedemann Bach: Concerto in D for flute; Sinfonia in D minor; Concerto in E minor for Cembalo; Concerto in E-flat for Two Cembalos. Performed by Karl Kaiser (flute) and Michael Behringer and Robert Hill (fortepiano and harpsichord), directed by Gottfried von der Goltz (Carus 83.304)
- Christoph Willibald Gluck: Orfeo ed Euridice. Performed by Bernarda Fink, Veronica Cangemi, and María Cristina Kiehr with the RIAS Kammerchor, directed by René Jacobs (Harmonia Mundi 901742/43)
- Joseph Haydn: Symphonies Nos. 6–8 (Le matin, Le midi, Le soir). Performed by the Freiburg Baroque Orchestra (Harmonia Mundi 901767)
- Wolfgang Amadeus Mozart: Arias from Lucio Silla; Die Zauberflöte; Il rè pastore; Mitridate, rè di Ponto; Die Entführung aus dem Serail; La clemenza di Tito; Zaide. Performed by Sandrine Piau (soprano) directed by Gottfried von der Goltz (Naïve-Astrée E8877)
- Wolfgang Amadeus Mozart: Piano Concertos Nos 17 & 22 (K.453 & K.482) with soloist Kristian Bezuidenhout, fortepiano (Harmonia Mundi 902147)
- Felix Mendelssohn: Violin Concerto – Symphony No. 5 & The Hebrides. Performed by Isabelle Faust (violin) and Pablo Heras-Casado conducting (Harmonia Mundi 902325)

=== DVD ===
- Kirchschlager, Angelika; Tomasz Stańko; Gottfried von der Goltz; ensemble amarcord (2004). Sounds Like Christmas (DVD). EuroArts Music International. OCLC 57126504.
