= Johann Jakob Walther (composer) =

German violinist and composer

Johann Jakob Walther (1650 – 2 November 1717) was a German violinist and composer.

== Life ==
All the known facts of his life and activity are from the Musikalischen Lexikon by Johann Gottfried Walther (Johann Sebastian Bach's cousin), a dictionary which first appeared in 1732. J. J. Walther was born in Witterda bei Erfurt. Between 1670 and 1674 he is said to have remained a violinist in the orchestra of Cosimo III of the Medicis in Florence. From 1674 he was concertmaster at the court of Dresden. After the death of his patron in 1680 he became the Italian secretary at the elector's court in Mainz and was ordained a canon. He died in Mainz.

Alongside Biber and Westhoff, J. J. Walther is one of the most significant German violinists of the 17th century. Besides a virtuoso technique including doublestops and arpeggios, his works display a wealth of formal devices, especially in the treatment of ostinato variations.

== Works ==
40 compositions are known, contained in two volumes:

1. Scherzi da Violino solo con il basso continuo, published in 1676. This cycle anticipates Paganini's technique in that it contains pizzicato harp imitations while the bow imitates nightingale song.
2. Hortulus chelicus published in 1688 (in the second printing of 1694 with the new title Wohlgepflanzter Violinischer Lustgarten). In the foreword, Walther expresses his confidence that this self-published volume will enjoy the same success as its predecessor. It contains 28 pieces and is more varied than the other collection.
