= Byron Schenkman =

American harpsichordist, pianist and music director

Schenkman, Byron
- Born: Byron Schenkman; 1966 (age 59–60)
- Origin: Lafayette, Indiana, United States
- Genres: Classical; Baroque
- Occupation: Harpsichordist
- Instruments: Harpsichord; Piano; Fortepiano
- Years active: 1981–present
- Labels: Centaur Records, Wildboar Records, Loft Recordings, Dorian Recordings, Focus, Virgin Classics, Naxos Records, Boxwood Media, Matthews & Schenkman, CD Baby, BS&F Recordings, Acis Productions
- Website: byronschenkman.com

Byron Schenkman (born 1966) is an American harpsichordist, pianist, music director, and educator. Schenkman has recorded over 40 CDs and has won several awards and accolades. They co-founded the Seattle Baroque Orchestra, and were its artistic director. Schenkman currently directs a baroque and classical chamber music concert series, Sound Salon, formerly Byron Schenkman & Friends, and performs as a recitalist and concert soloist. They also perform with chamber music ensembles, and are a teacher and lecturer.

== Early years ==
Schenkman grew up in a musical family on a farm in Lafayette, Indiana. They graduated from the New England Conservatory, where they were a student of John Gibbons. They studied with Elisabeth Wright and Edward Auer at the Indiana University Jacobs School of Music, and earned a Master of Music degree with Honors in Performance. In 1990 they earned a Performer's Certificate in Harpsichord from Indiana University School of Music. In 1991 Schenkman was a finalist in the Cambridge Society for Early Music's International Mozart Competition.

== Career ==
At first Schenkman played harpsichord and fortepiano. They have recorded dozens of albums, and have made solo and concerto appearances in the Americas, Europe, and Asia. In 1999 they won the Cambridge Society for Early Music's Erwin Bodky Award, given "for outstanding achievement in the field of early music". In 2003 Schenkman's recording with Musica Pacifica, Telemann: Chamber Cantatas & Trio Sonatas, won the Chamber Music America/WQXR Record Award. In 2004 Schenkman was awarded a Partners of the Americas travel grant which enabled them to perform and teach in Chile. In 2006 Schenkman was voted "Best Classical Instrumentalist" by the readers of the Seattle Weekly newspaper. In 2007 they were featured in the Seattle Magazine Music Portfolio of Seattle's Defining Musicians as a Key Player saying that "He makes 300-year-old music sound fresh."

Schenkman has worked with baroque violinist Ingrid Matthews. In 1994 they co-founded Seattle Baroque Orchestra, where Schenkman was artistic director from 1994 through 2004, and co-director from 2010 to 2013. In 2014 Schenkman and Matthews received the Indiana University Jacobs School of Music Entrepreneur of the Month award. Schenkman also performs with various chamber ensembles and tours internationally with their contemporaries. They perform as a guest artist with chamber music ensembles in North America. Their live performances at the Boston Early Music Festival have been compared with those of Vladimir Horowitz and Jimi Hendrix. They were reviewed in The Boston Globe as "a superb and imaginative instrumentalist".

Schenkman gave their first recital on modern piano at Town Hall, Seattle, in 2001, and has since been active performing and recording on modern piano and harpsichord. Their New York recital debut playing modern piano was in 2009. Schenkman's playing has been described as "dazzling" in American Record Guide, and listed in the Chicago Tribune as a favorite recording of 2000, for "stylish, invigorating performances". They released The Art of the Harpsichord in 2017 to critical acclaim, featuring eight different historical harpsichords from the National Music Museum.

In 2013, Schenkman formed Byron Schenkman & Friends.

In 2017 Schenkman created a new recording label named Byron Schenkman & Friends. In 2018 the recording label name was changed to BS&F Recordings.

On March 26, 2023, Schenkman performed the world premiere of Concerto for Harpsichord and Strings composed by Caroline Shaw on a commission to mark the 10th season of Byron Schenkman & Friends.

In 2023 Byron Schenkman & Friends was rebranded as Sound Salon.

Schenkman teaches music history at Seattle University, where they are a member of the Fine Arts Faculty in the College of Arts and Sciences. They were a member of the Early Music Faculty at Cornish College of the Arts in Seattle, where they taught harpsichord, piano, and music history from 2005 to 2017. In 2012 Schenkman was visiting instructor of fortepiano and harpsichord at the Indiana University Jacobs School of Music. Schenkman gives master classes on 18th-century performance, informal lecture-recitals, and pre-concert talks. They also teach harpsichord master classes, serve artistic residencies, and teach music history at music festivals and universities. Schenkman is a frequent guest on radio station 98.1, Classical KING-FM.

Their principal harpsichord was built by Craig Tomlinson in 2013.

== Discography ==
=== Solo recordings ===
- Johann Kaspar Kerll: Keyboard Suites & Toccata – FOCUS, 1996 ASIN: B000004A7B
- The Bauyn Manuscript: 17th-century French Harpsichord Music – WILDBOAR [WLBR 9603], 1996
- Jean-Henry D' Anglebert – Centaur Records, 1997 [CRC 2435]
- George Frideric Handel: Harpsichord Variations – Centaur Records, 1997 [CRC 2436]
- Louis Couperin: Harpsichord Music – Centaur Records, 2001 [CRC 2608]
- The Fitzwilliam Virginal Book – with Maxine Eilander, harp, Centaur Records, 2001 [CRC 2638]
- Jacques Duphly: Second Livre de Pieces de Clavecin – Centaur Records, 2002 [CRC 2714]
- Joseph Haydn: Sonatas for the Harpsichord – Centaur Records, 2002 [CRC 2733]
- Joseph Haydn: Six Sonatas and an Adagio with Katie Wolfe, violin, – Centaur Records, 2005 [CRC 2733] [CRC 2806]
- Muzio Clementi – Centaur Records, 2009 [CRC 3078]
- The Art of the Harpsichord – Byron Schenkman & Friends, 2017 ASIN: B074CPHTTY
- Sonatas by Domenico Scarlatti - BS&F Recordings, 2018 ASIN: B07DP5Y3GS

=== Collaborative recordings ===
- Joseph Bodin de Boismortier: Sonatas for Flute and Harpsichord, Op. 91 – American Baroque, Stephen Schultz, baroque flute; Byron Schenkman, harpsichord, Naxos Records [Catalogue No. 8.553414], 1995
- Mozart in Mannheim – Zephyrus ensemble; Courtney Westcott, flute; Ingrid Matthews, violin; Shelley Taylor, cello; Byron Schenkman, harpsichord and fortepiano; Dana Maiben, viola; FOCUS [# 945], 1995
- in Stil Moderno – Ingrid Matthews, violin; Byron Schenkman, harpsichord, WILDBOAR [WLBR 9512], 1995
- Elizabeth Jacquet de la Guerre: Sonates pour le Viollon 1707 – Ingrid Matthews, violin; Byron Schenkman, harpsichord; Margriet Tindemans, viola da gamba, WILDBOAR [WLBR 9601], 1995
- Jean-Fery Rebel: Sonatas pour le Violin – Ingrid Matthews, violin; Byron Schenkman, harpsichord; Margriet Tindemans, viola da gamba, WILDBOAR [WLBR 9602], 1995
- Georg Frideric Handel: Tra Le Fiamme – Byron Schenkman, harpsichord; Ellen Hargis, soprano, WILDBOAR [WLBR 9604], 1996
- Andrea Falconieri – Ingrid Matthews & Scott Metcalf, violins; Emily Walhout, viola da gamba; Byron Schenkman, harpsichord, WILDBOAR [WLBR 9605], 1996
- Marin Marais: Suites en Trio, Pieces de Violes, 4th Livre – Music's Re-Creation, Byron Schenkman, harpsichord, Centaur Records [CRC2334], 1997
- Marin Marais: Pieces en Trio – Musica Pacifica, Virgin Veritas [ZDMB 7243], : 1997
- J.S. Bach: Harpsichord Concertos – Byron Schenkman, harpsichord; Ingrid Matthews, violin, Centaur Records [CRC 2497], 1998
- Il Giardino Corrupto – Scott Metcalfe & Ingrid Matthews, baroque violins; Emily Walhout, viola da gamba; Byron Schenkman, harpsichord, WILDBOAR [WLBR 9903], 1999
- Antonio Vivaldi: Bassoon Concertos – Ingrid Matthews, violin; Byron Schenkman, harpsichord; Michael McCraw, bassoon, Centaur Records [2538], 1999
- Canzoni da Sonar – Ingrid Matthews, baroque violin; Byron Schenkman, harpsichord, Centaur Records [CRC 2529], : March 2000
- Francesco Guerini: Cello Sonatas – Sarah Freiberg, baroque cello; Byron Schenkman, harpsichord and fortepiano, Centaur Records [2534], 2000
- Alessandro Scarlatti: Concerti Da Camera – Musica Pacifica, Judith Linsenberg, recorders, Elizabeth Blumenstock, violin, Ingrid Matthews, violin; George Thomson, viola; Claire Garabedian, cello; Michael Eagan, flute; Byron Schenkman, harpsichord, DORIAN [DOR 93192], Release date: 01/11/2000
- Sprezzatura: Virtuoso Music of 17th Century Italy – Ensemble: La Luna, Ingrid Matthews & Scott Metcalf, violins; Emily Walhout, viola da gamba; Byron Schenkman, harpsichord, DORIAN (DOR #93200) 2001
- Georg Philipp Telemann: Chamber Cantatas & Trio Sonatas – Musica Pacifica ensemble, Judith Linsenberg, recorder; Christine Brandes, Elizabeth Blumenstock, violin; Byron Schenkman, harpsichord, DORIAN [DOR-93239]; 2001
- Heinrich Biber: Sonatas for Strings – Byron Schenkman, harpsichord; Ingrid Matthews, violin; David Greenberg, violin, Centaur Records [ CRC 2615], 2001
- Alessandro Scarlatti: Agar et Ismaele Esiliati [The Exile of Hagar and Ishmael] – Ingrid Matthews, violin; Byron Schenkman, harpsichord; with Karina Gauvin, Nathaniel Watson, Melissa Fogarty, Jennifer Lane, Centaur Records [ CRC 2664], Recorded: November 2001
- Music of J.S. Bach: Sonata in D Major, BWV 1028 – Emily Walhout, viola da gamba; Byron Schenkman, harpsichord, Centaur Records [CRC 2715], 2002
- J.C. Bach: Sonatas for Fortepiano and Flute – Byron Schenkman, fortepiano; Courtney Westcott, flute; LOFT Recordings [LRCD 1045], 2003
- Wind and Wire: Music of 18th Century Scotland – Chris Norman, Baroque Flutes; Byron Schenkman, Harpsichord, Boxwood Media (824594005223) [BOX 903], 2003
- The Pachelbel Canon and other Baroque Favorites – Byron Schenkman, harpsichord; Ingrid Matthews, violin, LOFT Recordings [LRCD 1019], 2003
- J. S. Bach: Six Sonatas for Violin & Harpsichord – Ingrid Matthews, baroque violin; Byron Schenkman, harpsichord; Independent Release, 2007, ASIN: B00125WBUY, 2-CD set
- Mozart: Piano Trios – Byron Schenkman, piano; Gabriela Diaz, violin; Alexei Yupanqui Gonzales, cello, Centaur Records [CRC 3031], 2008
- Russian Dreams – Byron Schenkman, piano; Masha Lankovsky, violin, Centaur Records [CRC 3352] 2014
- Vivaldi: Chamber Works – Byron Schenkman, harpsichord; Ingrid Matthews, violin; Nathan Whittaker, cello; John Lenti, theorbo; Tekla Cunningham, violin, Centaur Records [CRC 3307] 2014
- Beethoven alla Britannia – Byron Schenkman, piano; Ingrid Matthews, violin; Nathan Whittaker, cello; Linda Tsatsanis, soprano, Centaur Records [CRC 3497] 2016
- Britten and Pears: The Canticles - Byron Schenkman, piano; Zach Finkelstein, tenor; Vicki St. Pierre, contralto; Alexander Hajek, baritone; Jeffrey Fair, horn; Valerie Muzzolini Gordon, harp, Scribe Records, [SRCD9] 2017
- Chamber Music of Clara Schumann - Byron Schenkman, piano; Jesse Irons, violin; Kate Bennett Wadsworth, cello, BS&F Recordings (888295931601), 2019
- Art Songs of the Jewish Diaspora - Ian Pomerantz, bass-baritone; Byron Schenkman, piano; Sarah Freiberg, cello, Acis Productions (APL54155), 2024

=== Albums available as MP3 download only ===
- Meditation: Baroque Music for Relaxation – Various Artists, Centaur Records, 2010
- The J.S. Bach Exercise Album – Various Artists, Centaur Records, 2013
