= Ingrid Matthews =

Ingrid Matthews is a violinist and was the music director of the Seattle Baroque Orchestra.

Ingrid Matthews is recognized as one of the leading baroque violinists and period instrument performers. In 1989 she was awarded first prize in the Erwin Bodky International Competition for Early Music, and she has performed extensively with leading period-instrument ensembles such as Tafelmusik Baroque Orchestra, Philharmonia Baroque Orchestra and many others. Matthews has served as concertmaster for the New York Collegium, under the direction of Andrew Parrott, and for the Boston Early Music Festival Orchestra, and as a guest director/soloist with numerous groups across North America. She studied with Josef Gingold and Stanley Ritchie at the Indiana University Jacobs School of Music.

Matthews founded Seattle Baroque Orchestra with harpsichordist Byron Schenkman in 1994 and was the music director from 1994 to 2013.

Matthews recorded many works from the baroque period, (including the Sonatas and Partitas for solo violin by Johann Sebastian Bach).
