= Friedrich von Westhoff =

Swedish officer and trombonist (1611 - 1694)

Friedrich von Westhoff (Lübeck, 1611 - Dresden, 1694) was a Swedish officer who remained in Germany and became a trombonist at the Dresden court. His son Johann Paul von Westhoff (b. 1656) became a distinguished pupil of Heinrich Schütz (d. 1672).
