= Partitas for solo violin (Westhoff) =

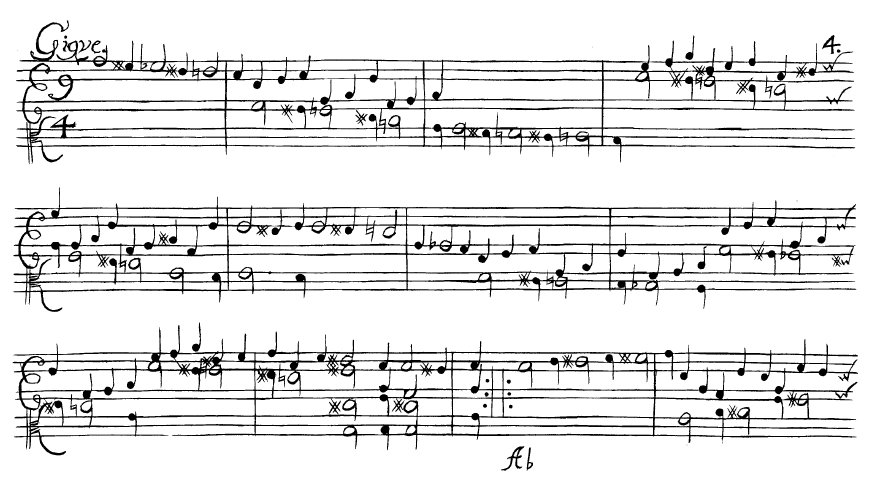
The beginning of the gigue from Partita No. 1 in A minor.

The six partitas for solo violin by Johann Paul von Westhoff are the earliest known published music for solo violin. Although Westhoff's compositions were rediscovered by scholars already in the mid-19th century, this work was not found until the late 20th century.

== History ==
The collection of six partitas was discovered in the late 20th century by musicologist Peter P. Várnai. He announced his discovery in a 1971 article, Ein unbekanntes Werk von Johann Paul von Westhoff ("An Unknown Work by Johann Paul von Westhoff"), published in Die Musikforschung, volume 24. The extant copy is dated 1696, but it may be a reprint (partial or full) of a much earlier publication by Westhoff, the Erstes Dutzend Allemanden, Couranten, Sarabanden und Giguen Violino Solo sonder Passo Continuo ("First Dozen of Allemandes, Courantes, Sarabandes and Gigues for solo violin without basso continuo"). This collection was published in Dresden in 1682 and is considered lost. The first modern edition of the partitas appeared in 1974.

Nothing is known about how or when the partitas were composed. One other work for solo violin by Westhoff survives, a 1683 suite published in an issue of Dresden's Mercure galant, so it is entirely possible that the composer had more solo violin works. The six surviving partitas are historically important works, for they are one of the earliest known published music for solo violin (and the aforementioned suite is the earliest known multi-movement piece for solo violin), and were most probably the inspiration for Johann Sebastian Bach's sonatas and partitas for solo violin.

== Music ==
The partitas all consist of four dances, arranged in the standard late Baroque order, i.e. allemande—courante—sarabande—gigue. The order of the partitas in the collection is as follows:

- Partita No. 1 in A minor
- Partita No. 2 in A major
- Partita No. 3 in B♭ major
- Partita No. 4 in C major
- Partita No. 5 in D minor
- Partita No. 6 in D major

Typically for Baroque music, few tempo or dynamic indications are given. In a few instances, Westhoff indicates an echo effect using p and f markings. The only ornaments present in the score are trills. The music is technically demanding: fully polyphonic with frequent instances of tricky double stopping.

== Recordings ==
Westhoff's suites appear on compilations, but this section only lists complete or almost complete recordings of the cycle.

- Violin Masters of the 17th Century (Elizabeth Wallfisch, violin). Hyperion CDA67238, 2002. (suites 1–2 and 4–6 only)
- Johann Paul von Westhoff: Complete Suites for Solo Violin (Kolja Lessing, violin). Capriccio C67083, 2004. (complete)
- Augustes Auspices (Rachel J. Harris, violin). Ambitus 96 987, 2017. (complete)
- Johann Paul von Westhoff: Six Partitas (Suites) for Solo Violin, Arranged for Viola by Marco Misciagna (Marco Misciagna, viola). MM, 2026. (complete)
