= Oboe concerto No. 1 (Krommer) =

Composition by Franz Krommer

The Oboe Concerto No. 1 in F major, Op. 37, is an oboe concerto composed by the Czech composer Franz Krommer.

The concerto consists of three movements:

1. Allegro
2. Adagio
3. Rondo. Allegro
