= Maurizio Scaramucci =

Italian footballer

Maurizio Scaramucci (born 21 August 1970 in Ascoli Piceno) is an Italian retired footballer. He played as a goalkeeper. He played from 1989 for Ascoli youth teams. He made his debut in Serie A on 18 April 1992 against Cagliari. At the end of the season, Genoa was relegated to Serie B, where Marcello played one match. He remained at Ascoli until 1993, and then he went to play in lower divisions.

== Career ==
1989–1993 Ascoli 1 (0)
1994–1996 Vis Stella Monsanpolo
1998–1999 Pozzo
2000–2005 Centobuchi
2005–2006 Acquasanta
2009 Villa Pigna
