= Johann Paul von Westhoff =

German Baroque composer and violinist

Johann Paul von Westhoff (1656 – buried 17 April 1705) was a German Baroque composer and violinist. One of the most important exponents of the Dresden violin school, he was among the highest ranked violinists of his day, and composed some of the earliest known music for solo violin. He worked as musician and composer as a member of Dresden's Hofkapelle (1674–1697) and at the Weimar court (1699–1705), and was also active as a teacher of contemporary languages.

Westhoff's surviving music comprises seven works for violin and basso continuo and seven for solo violin, all published during his lifetime. More works, particularly a 1682 collection of solo violin music, are currently considered lost. His work, together with that of Heinrich Ignaz Franz Biber and Johann Jakob Walther, greatly influenced the subsequent generation of German violinists, and the six partitas for solo violin inspired Johann Sebastian Bach's famous violin sonatas and partitas.

== Life ==
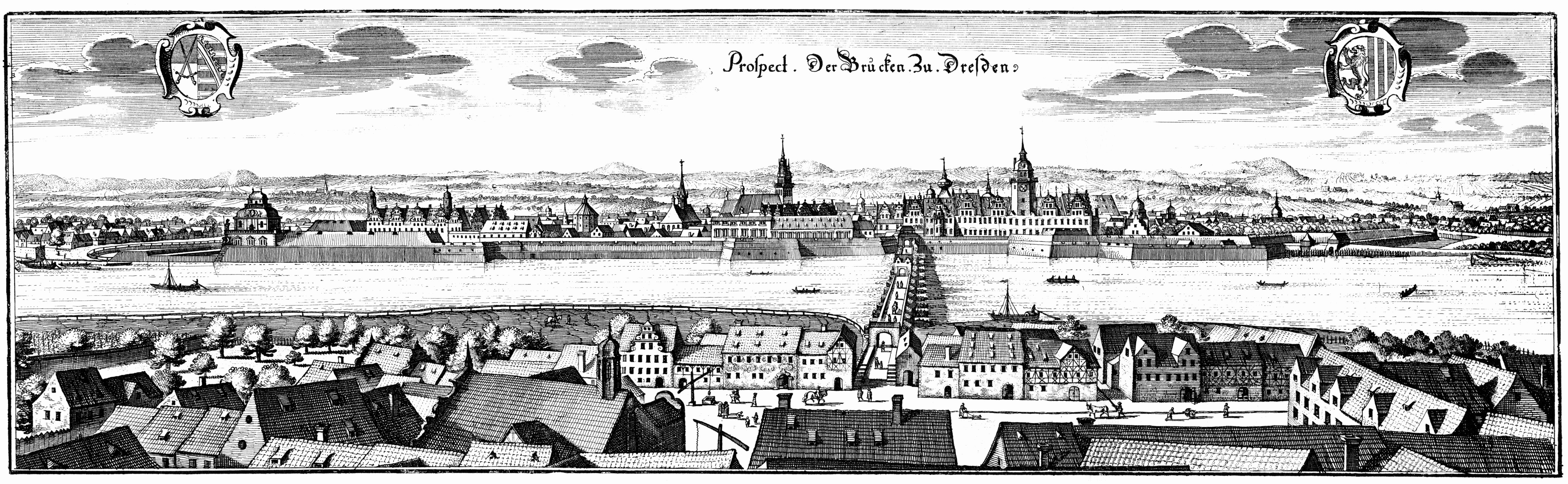
A panorama of Dresden in 1650, engraving by Matthäus Merian.

The composer was born in the Dresden, then capital of Saxony. He received a solid musical education as a pupil of Heinrich Schütz (d. 1672), and in 1674 joined the Dresden Hofkapelle, where his father, a former Swedish cavalry officer, Friedrich von Westhoff worked. The Hofkapelle had a strong violin tradition that started with Carlo Farina's publications of the 1620s, and was continued and supported during Westhoff's time by the celebrated violinist Johann Jakob Walther and operatic composer Nicolaus Adam Strungk. Westhoff remained a member of the Hofkapelle for more than 20 years, during which he travelled throughout Europe. He left Dresden in 1697 and briefly taught contemporary languages at the University of Wittenberg (later merged with University of Halle into University of Halle-Wittenberg). Then, in 1699, Westhoff became chamber secretary, chamber musician and teacher of French and Italian at the court at Weimar. Westhoff died in Weimar in April 1705. The exact date of death is unknown.

Westhoff's reputation was extremely high during his lifetime. Contemporaries ranked him, along with Heinrich Ignaz Franz Biber and Johann Jakob Walther, among the best German violinists of the era. Already in 1671, at the age of 15, he was so well-connected that he became a tutor to two Saxon princes, Johann George and Friedrich August. His influence must have spread wide, too, since journeys took him to numerous countries: Hungary, Italy, France (where he played before Louis XIV in 1682), the Dutch Republic, and the imperial court in Vienna. For instance, Westhoff's 1682 sonata is found in an Italian source, and his music must have influenced Giuseppe Colombi and other prominent Italian violinists of the time.

== Music ==
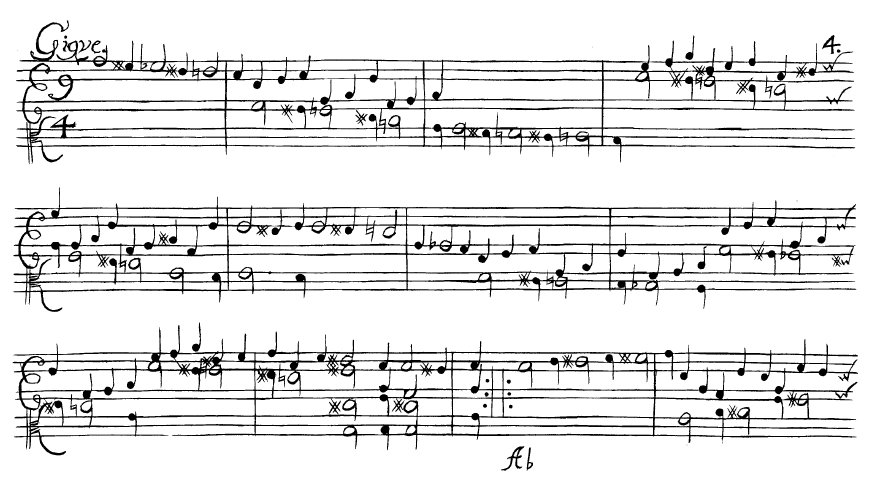
The beginning of the chromatic gigue from Partita No. 1 in A minor for solo violin by Westhoff.

His style was influenced by that of the somewhat older Walther, with whom he worked for several years at the Dresden Hofkapelle. In turn, Westhoff influenced Johann Sebastian Bach, who was his colleague in Weimar; the two composers probably met in 1703. Westhoff's known music includes two collections published during his lifetime: Sonate a Violino solo con basso continuo (Dresden, 1694) and six solo partitas for violin published in Dresden in 1696. The solo partitas may be a reprint of a collection currently considered lost, Erstes Dutzend Allemanden, Couranten, Sarabanden und Giguen Violino Solo sonder Passo Continuo (Dresden, 1682). Furthermore, two pieces by Westhoff were published in a French magazine, Mercure galant. The first was a sonata for violin and basso continuo published in the December 1682 issue—apparently the piece Westhoff played for Louis XIV, which the king greatly admired. The second, a suite for solo violin, was published in the January 1683 issue.

Westhoff's 1683 suite is the earliest known multi-movement piece for solo violin. Along with the six solo partitas, it was an important forerunner of Johann Sebastian Bach's celebrated Sonatas and Partitas for Solo Violin. These were started during Bach's Weimar years and finished some 24 years after the earliest known print of Westhoff's partitas; the musical characteristics seem to show that Bach's work was at least conceptually indebted to Westhoff's. Westhoff's violin writing is highly advanced, featuring double stopping up to the fourth position. Westhoff's solo violin music is distinctly German, with dense polyphony and robust themes, but the continuo sonatas show a pronounced Italian influence.

== List of works ==
- Erstes Dutzend Allemanden, Couranten, Sarabanden und Giguen Violino Solo sonder Basso Continuo (Dresden, 1682), lost
- Sonata for violin and basso continuo (December 1682, published in Mercure galant)
- Suite for violin solo (January 1683, published in Mercure galant)
- Sonate a Violino solo con basso continuo (Dresden, 1694)
- Solo partitas for violin (Dresden, 1696; possibly a partial reprint of Erstes Dutzend)
