= Jean-Baptiste Volumier =

Eighteenth century musician

Jean-Baptiste Volumier (Woulmyer, c. 1670 – 7 October 1728) was an eighteenth century violinist, composer and concertmaster.

== Life ==
Volumier was born in around 1670 or 1677; sources differ. He was probably born in the Spanish Flanders although some earlier sources indicate simply that he was born in Spain. As a young man he was schooled in music in Paris, possibly at the French court, and it was the then fashionable French style that he would follow as a performer and composer. Moving to Berlin, in 1692 he gained a position as a violinist in the court orchestra of the Electorate of Brandenburg. He quickly gained promotion through the ranks, emerging as the court concertmaster (maître de concert), taking care of ballet and dance. He composed arias and dance music for the marriage, in 1706, of the then crown prince Frederick William I of Prussia. Although his responsibilities included the regular composition of dance music, none of his compositions from the period survive. In 1708, following a dispute, he was relieved of all his duties at the Berlin court.

In 1709 he was taken on as concertmaster at the rival court of Dresden: the appointment came with a generous annual salary of 1,200 Thalers. Applying the French style he made the Dresden orchestra one of the best in Europe. Under his directorship musicians such as Veracini and Pisendel joined the court orchestra. As time went on he became adept at blending the French and Italian styles, with an added frisson of German elements, creating something that came to be called the "mixed" or "German" style. The flautist Johann Joachim Quantz wrote in an autobiographical contribution to Friedrich Wilhelm Marpurg's Historisch-kritische Beyträge zur Aufnahme der Musik [historical-critical contributions on the reception of music] that he had never heard a better orchestra than the Dresden orchestra under Volumier.

In 1715 the Saxon king-elector sent his star court violinist to Cremona where for several months Volumier remained, in order to oversee the production of twelve violins ordered from the manufactory of Antonio Stradivarius.

While he was employed in Dresden Volumier also developed a friendship with Bach. In 1717 the French musician Louis Marchand visited Dresden and so impressed the king-elector that he offered Marchand a lucrative court appointment. The story of what happened next has been much repeated in German sources (though never in French ones), with various embellishments. The key elements appear to be that Volumier, sensing the risk of trouble ahead, organised a keyboard (probably clavier) contest between Marchand and his friend Bach. However, Marchand became nervous at the prospect and early on the morning of the day scheduled for the contest left Dresden, never to return. Marchand's hasty departure strengthened the position at court of the chapel organist, Christian Petzold. The story seems to have originated with the organist-musicologist Jakob Adlung. In the interests of balance it is worth adding that Adlung also wrote of Bach's respect for Marchand's abilities as a keyboard player and composer.

Augustus the Strong, the elector of Saxony, with his court at Dresden, was also, for most of the time between 1697 and 1733, the king of Poland, with a court at Warsaw. It was while attending the royal court in Warsaw that Volumier fell ill, and after he returned to Dresden Pisendel had frequently to be called upon to deputise for him. Jean Baptiste Volumier died in October 1728. Starting two years later, in October 1730, his widow started to receive a twice yearly pension of 600 Gulden.

== Output ==
Volumier composed a large amount of ballet music and numerous violin pieces. They were all destroyed in a fire in 1760 while the city was under siege by a Prussian force under Frederick the Great.
