= Scaramuccia (music ensemble) =

Musical group

- Origin: The Hague, Netherlands
- Genres: Early Music; Baroque Music
- Years active: 2013–present
- Labels: Ayros; Snakewood Editions
- Members: Javier Lupiáñez; Inés Salinas; Patrícia Vintém
- Website: scaramucciaensemble.com

Scaramuccia is an early music ensemble founded in February 2013 on the initiative of Spanish violinist and musicologist Javier Lupiáñez.

Scaramuccia started in the Fringe of the Festival in Utrecht 2013 and in the Fringe in the Festival of Bruges 2013. Since then, the ensemble has developed an intense concert schedule in the Netherlands, Belgium, and the UK. Among other performances, Scaramuccia has played in the Maldon Festival of Arts in Maldon, UK (2014 and 2015), the Museum Vleeshuis in Antwerp, BE (2014), the Kasteelconcerten, NL (2015), Festival Echi Lontani, IT (2016) Internationaal Kamermuziek Festival Utrecht, NL (2016), and has also recorded for the Dutch radio station, Concertzender.

Scaramuccia has performed the world premières of three new Vivaldi pieces (the Trio sonata RV 820 the Sonata RV 205/2, and the violin Sonata RV 829) all works discovered by the leader of the ensemble, Javier Lupiáñez, in a live concert in the radio program De Musyck Kamer, broadcast on the Dutch radio station Concertzender in 2014..

Scaramuccia was voted as the best ensemble by the audience and won the Audience Award in the Göttinger Reihe Historischer Musik 2015/2016 competition in the Göttingen International Handel Festival.

== Discography ==
In November 2015, Scaramuccia recorded their first CD with the label Ayros, featuring new music by Vivaldi and the most recent discoveries of Vivaldi's music for violin and continuo and the world premiere recording of the violin sonata RV 205/2.

In September 2018, Scaramuccia released their second CD under their own label, Snakewood Editions: 1717. Memories of a Journey to Italy, featuring compositions by Albinoni, Vivaldi, Fanfani, Montanri, Valentini and Pisendel. The album was nominated in the category of best instrumental baroque music in the ICMA awards 2019.

In 2020 Scaramuccia released their third CD under their own label, Snakewood Editions: Pisendel. Neue Sonaten, featuring the World Premiere recording of newly discovered sonatas by Pisendel.

In 2023 Scaramuccia released their fourth CD under their own label: L’Altra Venezia, featuring world-premiere recordings of violin sonatas by Albinoni, Gentili, and other Venetian composers.

In 2024 Scaramuccia released a single digital recording featuring the world premiere recording of the violin sonata RV 829 by Antonio Vivaldi.
