= Gottfried von der Goltz =

German violinist and conductor

Gottfried Graf von der Goltz (born 1 June 1964 in Würzburg, Germany) is a German violinist and conductor, specialising in the baroque repertoire.

== Early life ==
Born into the ancient Brandenburgish noble von der Goltz family, as the son of Conrad Graf von der Goltz (born 1928) and his wife and relative, Kristine Hjort (1931–1992). Gottfried is a great-grandson of the former commander of the Baltic Sea Division and the Baltische Landeswehr during World War I and the Russian Civil War, General Count Rüdiger von der Goltz.

== Career ==
He was at first taught by his parents. After further education in Hannover, New York, and Freiburg, he joined the radio orchestra of Hamburg's Norddeutscher Rundfunk at the age of 21. Two years later he left in order to focus on his career as a soloist, chamber musician, and conductor. He is now musical leader of the Freiburger Barockorchester. From 1997 to 2004 he held a professorship with the Hochschule für Musik Würzburg. In October 2004 he was called to a professorship in violin and baroque violin at the Hochschule für Musik Freiburg. Since January 2007 von der Goltz has also been artistic director of the Oslo-based Norwegian Baroque Orchestra. His interests include salt-water swimming. His extensive discography and DVD production include recordings as soloist, chamber musician, and conductor, also of larger scenic works, like Rameau's Dardanus.
