= L'estro armonico =

Set of 12 violin concertos by Antonio Vivaldi

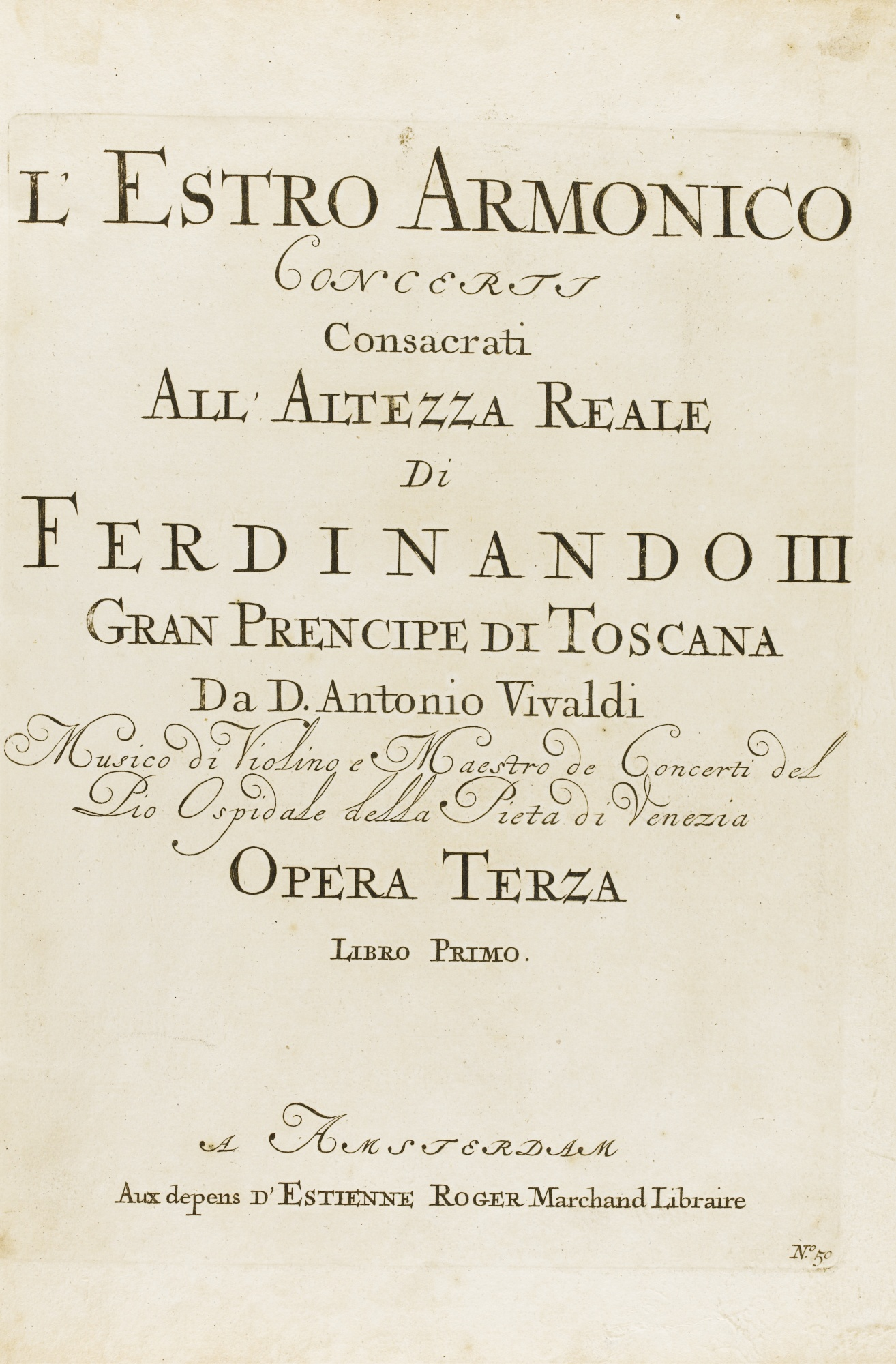
Title page of the first edition

L'estro armonico (The Harmonic Inspiration), Op. 3, is a set of 12 concertos for string instruments by Italian composer Antonio Vivaldi, first published in Amsterdam in 1711. Vivaldi scholar Michael Talbot described the set as "perhaps the most influential collection of instrumental music to appear during the whole of the eighteenth century".

== History ==
L'estro armonico (the harmonic inspiration) was published as Antonio Vivaldi's Op. 3 in Amsterdam in 1711 and dedicated to Ferdinando de'Medici, Grand Prince of Tuscany under the title of "Ferdinando III". Vivaldi's Twelve Trio Sonatas, Op. 1, and Twelve Violin Sonatas, Op. 2, only contained sonatas, thus L'estro armonico was his first collection of concertos appearing in print. It was also the first time Vivaldi chose a foreign publisher, Estienne Roger, instead of an Italian one. Vivaldi composed a few concertos specifically for L'estro armonico, while other concertos of the set had been composed at an earlier date.

== Structure ==
L'estro armonico is a set of 12 concertos for string instruments. In the 1711 first publication each concerto was printed in eight parts:

- Four violin parts
- Two viola parts
- Cello
- Continuo, printed as a figured bass for violone and harpsichord.

The concertos belong to the concerto a 7 format, that is: for each concerto there are seven independent parts. In each consecutive group of three concertos, the first is a concerto for four violins, the second for two violins, and the third a solo violin concerto. The cello gets solistic passages in several of the concertos for four and two violins, so that a few of the concertos conform to the traditional Roman concerto grosso format where a concertino of two violins and cello plays in contrast to a string orchestra a form pioneered by one of Vivaldi’s biggest influences Arcangelo Corelli. L'estro armonico pioneered orchestral unisono in concerto movements.

=== Concerto No. 1, RV 549 ===
Concerto No. 1 in D major for four violins, cello and strings, RV 549:

1. Allegro in 4/4 time
2. Largo e spiccato in 3/4 time
3. Allegro in 9/8 time

=== Concerto No. 2, RV 578 ===
Concerto No. 2 in G minor for two violins, cello and strings, RV 578:

1. Adagio e spiccato in 4/4 time
2. Allegro in 4/4 time
3. Larghetto in 3/4 time
4. Allegro in 12/8 time

=== Concerto No. 3, RV 310 ===
Concerto No. 3 in G major for solo violin and strings, RV 310:

1. Allegro in 4/4 time
2. Largo in 3/4 time
3. Allegro in 3/8 time

=== Concerto No. 4, RV 550 ===
Concerto No. 4 in E minor for four violins, cello and strings, RV 550:

1. Andante in 3/4 time
2. Allegro assai in 2/4 time
3. Adagio in 3/4 time
4. Allegro in 3/8 time

=== Concerto No. 5, RV 519 ===
Concerto for Two Violins in A minor, Op. 3 No. 8
I. Allegro

II. Larghetto e spiritoso

III. Allegro
Performed by the Advent Chamber Orchestra with Jacques Israelievitch and Roxana Pavel Goldstein (violins)

Concerto No. 5 in A major for two violins, cello and strings, RV 519:

1. Allegro in 4/4 time
2. Largo in 4/4 time
3. Allegro in 3/4 time

=== Concerto No. 6, RV 356 ===
Concerto No. 6 in A minor for solo violin and strings, RV 356:

1. Allegro in 4/4 time
2. Largo in 4/4 time
3. Presto in 2/4 time

=== Concerto No. 7, RV 567 ===
Violin Concerto in D major, Op. 3 No. 9 (Trumpet & Organ)
I. Allegro

II. Larghetto

III. Allegro
Performed by Michel Rondeau (trumpet) & Jeffrey Campbell (organ)

Concerto No. 7 in F major for four violins, cello and strings, RV 567:

1. Andante in 3/4 time
2. Adagio in 4/4 time
3. Allegro – Adagio in 4/4 time
4. Allegro in 3/4 time

=== Concerto No. 8, RV 522 ===
Concerto No. 8 in A minor for two violins and strings, RV 522:

1. Allegro in 4/4 time
2. Larghetto e spiritoso in 3/4 time
3. Allegro in 3/4 time

=== Concerto No. 9, RV 230 ===
Concerto for Four Violins, Cello, & Strings in B minor in D major, Op. 3 No. 10
|. Allegro

||. Larghetto

|||. Allegro
Performed by the Modena Chamber Orchestra

Concerto No. 9 in D major for solo violin and strings, RV 230:

1. Allegro in 4/4 time
2. Larghetto in 3/4 time
3. Allegro in 3/8 time

=== Concerto No. 10, RV 580 ===
Concerto No. 10 in B minor for four violins, cello and strings, RV 580:

1. Allegro in 4/4 time
2. Largo – Larghetto in 3/4 time
3. Allegro in 6/8 time

=== Concerto No. 11, RV 565 ===
Concerto for Two Violins in D minor, Op. 3 No. 11
|. Allegro – Adagio e spiccato – Allegro

||. Largo e spiccato

|||. Allegro
Performed by the Advent Chamber Orchestra with David Parry and Roxana Pavel Goldstein (violins)

Concerto No. 11 in D minor for two violins, cello and strings, RV 565:

1. Allegro – Adagio e spiccato – Allegro in 3/4, 4/4, and 4/4 time
2. Largo e spiccato (aka Siciliano) in 12/8 time
3. Allegro in 4/4 time

(Note that this concerto may be referred to as having 5 movements due to the tempo changes in the first movement.)

=== Concerto No. 12, RV 265 ===
Concerto No. 12 in E major for solo violin and strings, RV 265:

1. Allegro in 4/4 time
2. Largo e spiccato in 4/4 time
3. Allegro in 3/4 time

== Performance, transmission and reception ==
In our younger days, the fifth concerto of Vivaldi, composed of rattling passages in perpetual semiquavers, was the making of every player on the violin, who could mount into the clouds, and imitate not only the flight, but the whistling notes of birds.

— Charles Burney (1726–1814), Rees's Cyclopædia

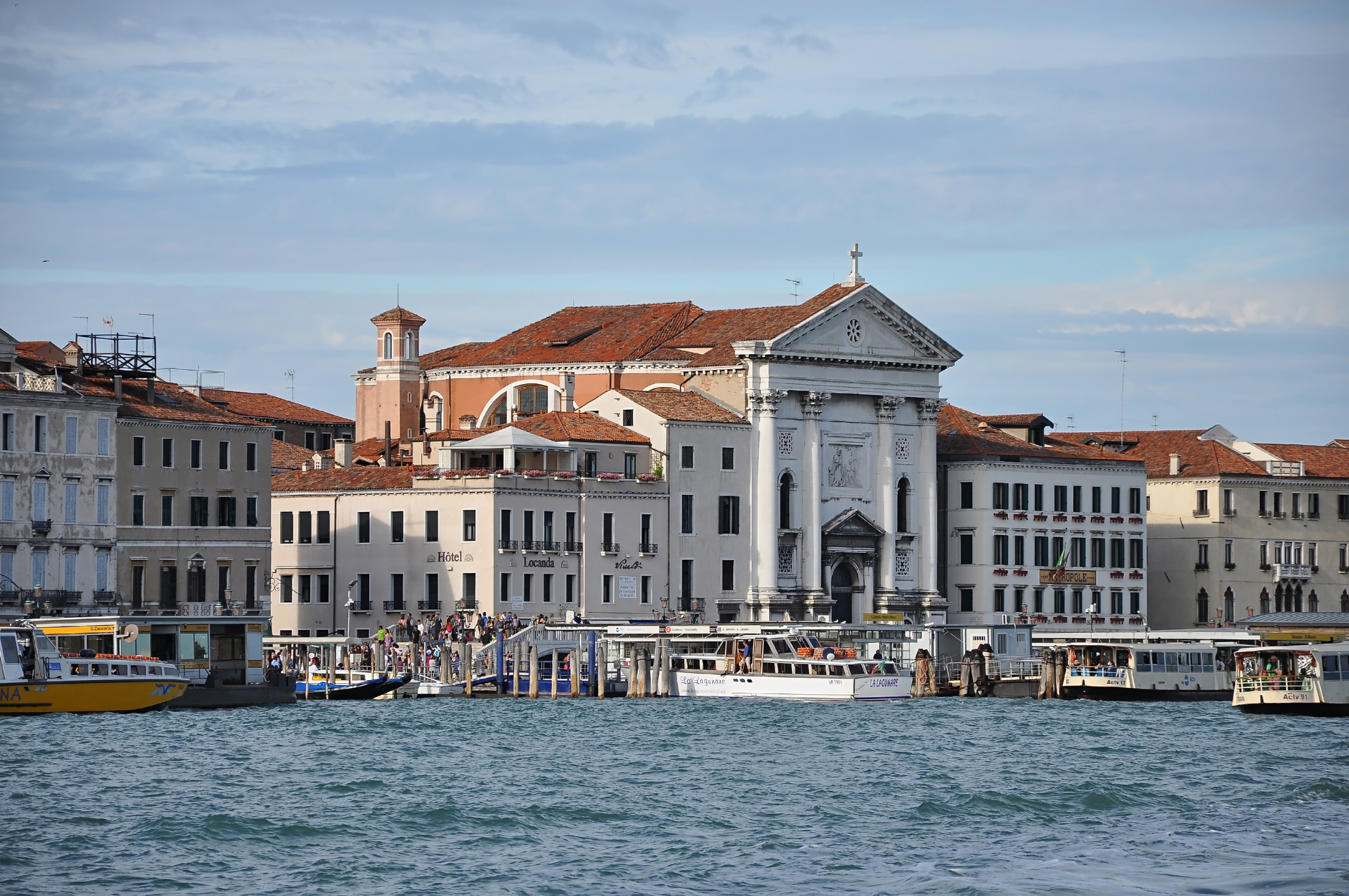
Santa Maria della Pietà, Venice, the church built on the site of the Ospedale della Pietà

In her preface to the Dover edition, Vivaldi scholar Eleanor Selfridge-Field gives an account of the performance and publication history of L'estro armonico. Probably initially composed for performance in the Ospedale della Pietà, the collection of 12 concertos was grouped in four cycles of three, each containing a concerto for 1, 2 and 4 concertante solo violins. Each double violin concerto also had a concertante violoncello part, which did not have a fixed role, sometimes playing solo, sometimes responding to the two violin soloists. In the Pietà, performances of the concertos would have allowed advanced pupils to develop their skills as soloists and given the chance to others to learn how to play in an ensemble. The dedicatee of the collection, Ferdinando de' Medici, frequently visited Venice from his native Florence and supported the Pietà. After a concert there in April 1711 featuring an oratorio by Gasparini, Vivaldi's senior colleague, the local Venetian newspaper reported that "the audience, larger than ever, was made ecstatic by the spirited harmony of such a variety of instruments". Selfridge-Field has suggested that it is highly likely that the concert included performances of concertos from L'estro armonico.

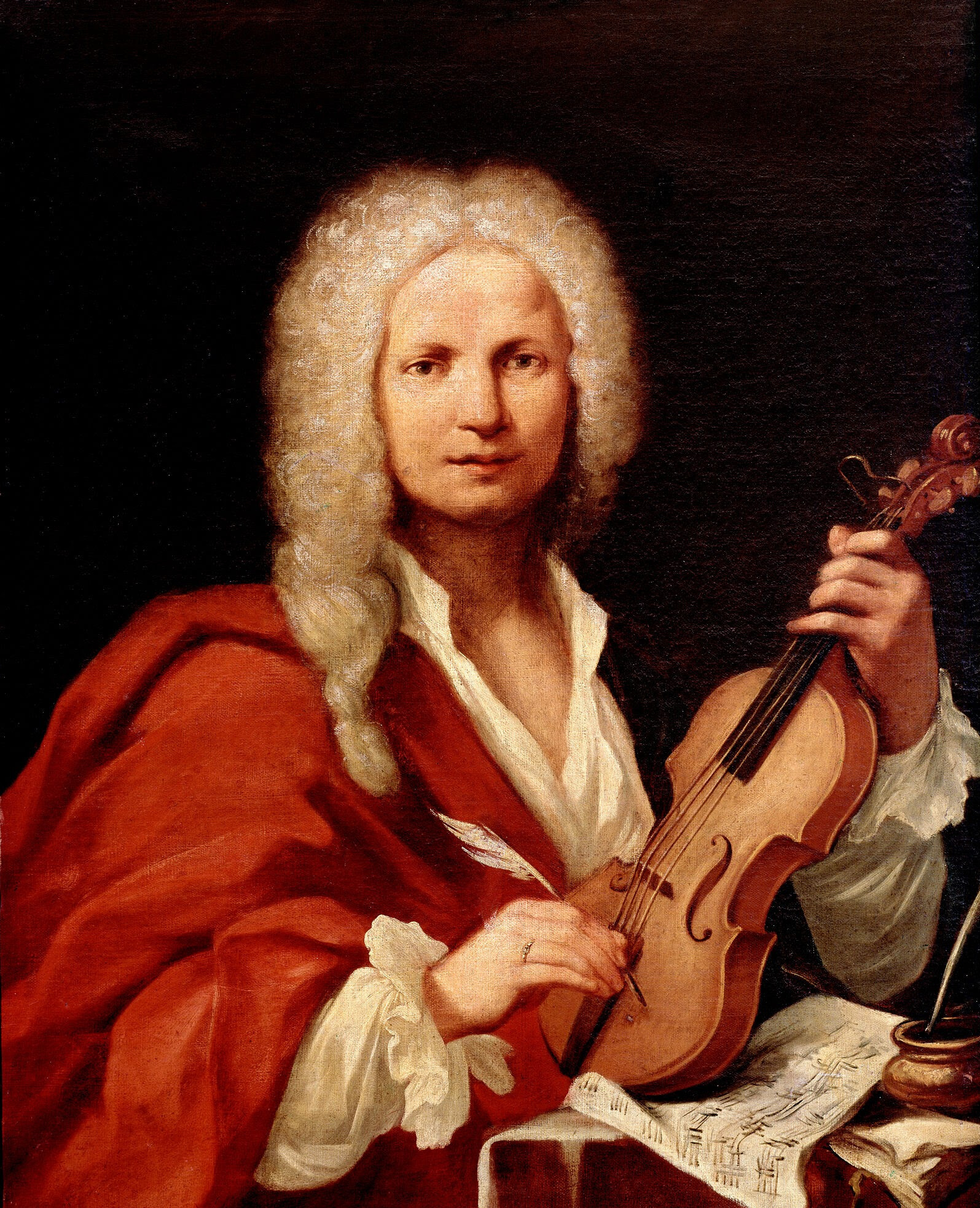
Probable portrait of Vivaldi, c. 1723

Following their publication, the concertos from the collection were widely performed in Italy, as church music and chamber music, both indoors and outdoors. In theatres and opera houses they were performed by small groups of 10, as in the Pietà, sometimes with Vivaldi as soloist. Open air concerts in the 1720s and 1730s could have as many as a hundred performers. Despite originating in a religious institution, the print copies were widely distributed throughout Europe, with 20 reprintings of Estienne Roger's Amsterdam edition between 1711 and 1743. Sales were slightly more successful than those of Vivaldi's famous 1725 collection Il cimento dell'armonia e dell'inventione which contained The Four Seasons.

In London John Walsh, Handel's printer, published the twelve concertos in two instalments in 1715 and 1717, when he also published all twelve in one volume, with individual concertos included in later collections. In London his version was pirated by other printing firms in the 1720s; and in Paris there were five or more reprintings from the late 1730s to the early 1750s. The works were also transmitted through manuscript copies, often of individual concertos, the most popular by far being Op. 3, No. 5, which has 15 known copies and transcriptions.

Talbot (2010) gives a detailed description, drawn from contemporary accounts, of the performances and reception of the concertos in Britain and Ireland in the eighteenth century. The most popular concerto from the set was Op. 3, No. 5, RV 519 which was commonly referred to as "Vivaldi's Fifth". Two other concertos from the set were also played by the public, Op. 3, Nos. 3 and 12. In a London catalogue from 1780, the solo part for each of the three concertos was advertised for a sum of sixpence per concerto; and in a different catalogue from 1790, the solo part with an added bass line was advertised at a price of one shilling per concerto.

Few Italian violinists promoted Vivaldi in England. In the case of Francesco Geminiani, this was due partly to his allegiance to his teacher Corelli and partly to his own ambitions as a composer. His protègé Charles Avison was almost certainly expressing Geminiani's views when he dismissed Vivaldi's concertos as "defective in various harmony and true invention", a withering reference to Il cimento dell'armonia e dell'inventione. On the other hand, in London the violinist Matthew Dubourg, another student of Francesco Geminiani, is known to have given many performances of the fifth concerto (at least as early as 1720) and used it for training his pupils; this is recounted by one of them, Francis Fleming, in the autobiographical novel The Life and Extraordinary Adventures of Timothy Ginnadrake:

At this time he had a great desire to learn the violin, and his father knowing something of it himself, initiated him; he improved so fast that he soon put it out of the power of his father to instruct him. The old gentleman finding he had a genius for music, engaged a famous musician, one Dubourg, to teach him; he also improved greatly under this professor: the 5th Concerto of Vivaldi was often performed on the stage at the theatre by Tim's master with great applause, as it was thought at that time that it was not in the power of any human being to execute a piece of music more difficult. This excited great emulation in our hero, who usually got up at four o'clock in the morning to practise the 5th of Vivaldi; he continued to do this for five months successively, besides what he did at other times, so that he did not upon an average play less than five hours every day: And indeed that instrument requires it, if a student is resolved to make any great proficiency.

The Irish violinist John Clegg, a child prodigy who studied with both Geminiani and Dubourg, is also known to have been an advocate of Vivaldi's concertos, although no records specifically mention L'estro armonico. To illustrate the extent to which "Vivaldi's Fifth" had entered the popular culture, Talbot mentions a 1743 musical entertainment where a performance was advertised in a programme involving "rope-dancing, tumbling, vaulting and equilibres", with dances that included "the Drunken Peasant", a "Hornpipe in wooden shoes" and new "Morrice dances". In a 1760 essay, Oliver Goldsmith recorded the following anecdote about the celebrated blind Irish harpist Turlough O'Carolan:

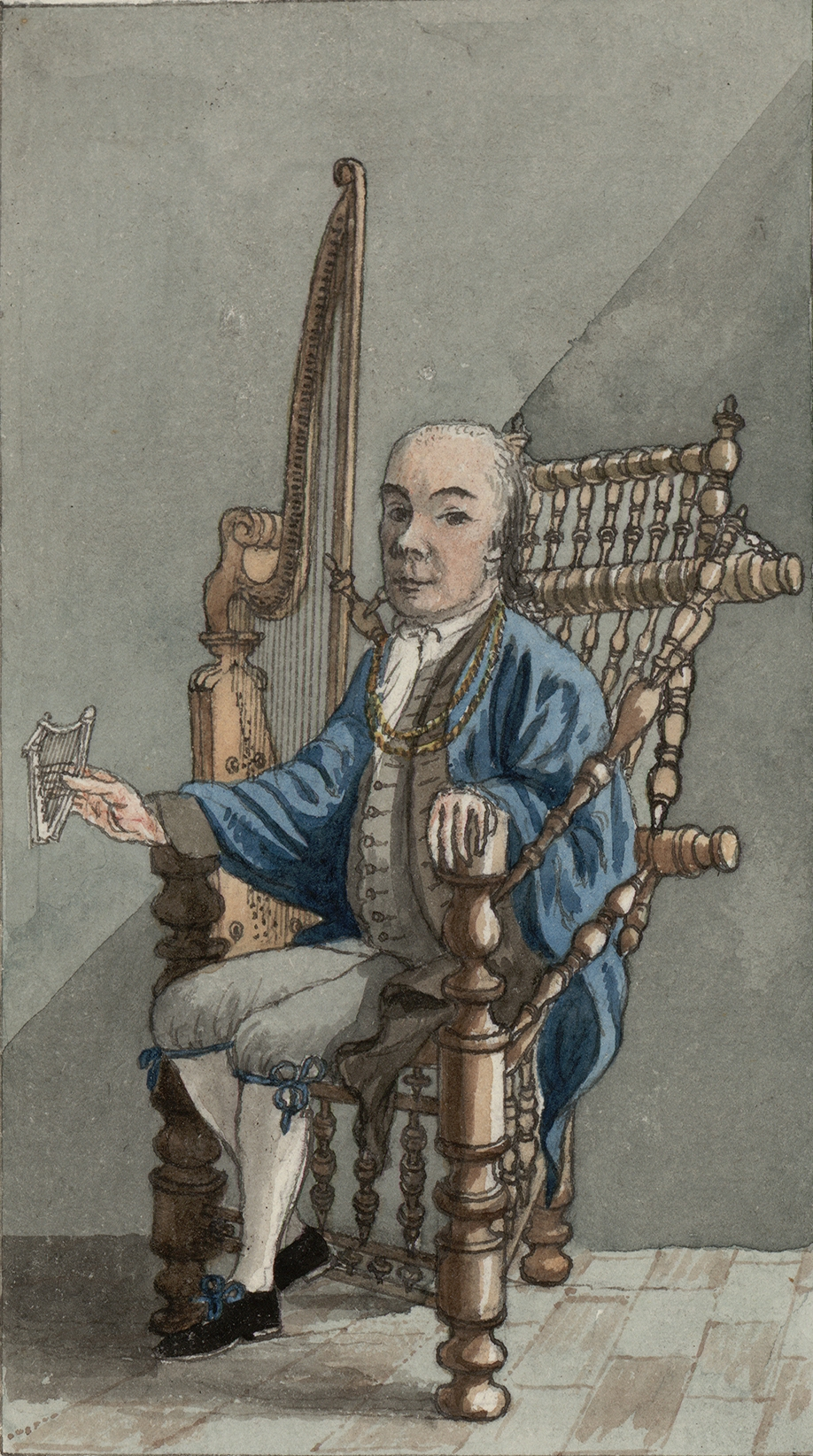
John Parry arranged the third and fifth concertos for harp

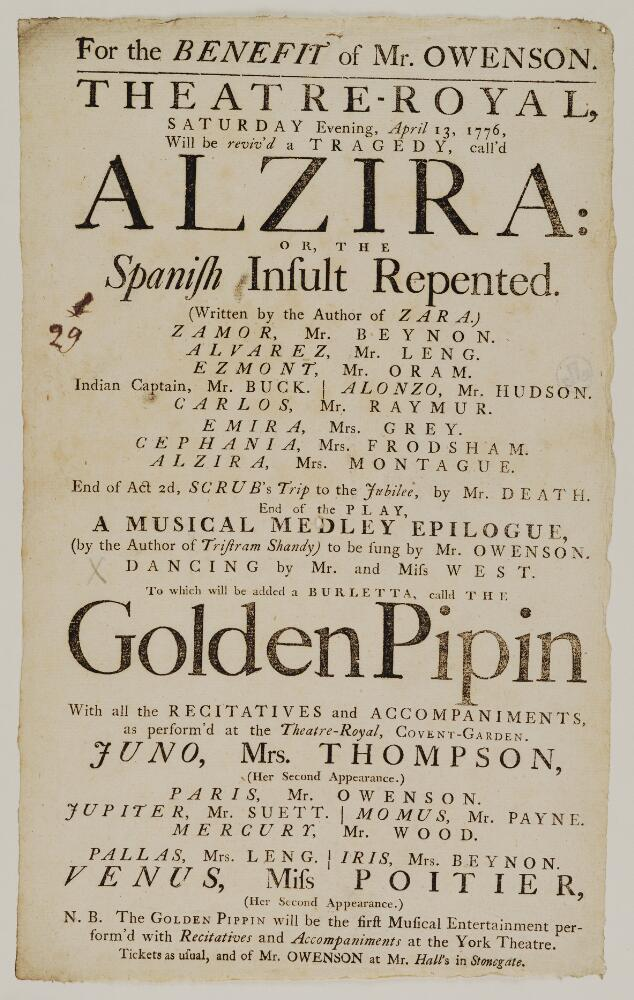
1776 Poster for "The Golden Pippin" at the Theatre Royal, York

Being once at the home of an Irish nobleman, where there was a musician present who was eminent in the profession, Carolan immediately challenged him to a trial of skill. To carry the jest forward, his lordship persuaded the musician to accept the challenge, and he accordingly played over the fifth concerto of Vivaldi. Carolan, immediately taking his harp, played over the whole piece after him, without missing a note, though he had never heard it before: which produced some surprize; but their astonishment increased, when he assured them he could make a concerto in the same taste himself, which he instantly composed with such spirit and eloquence, that it may compare (for we have it still) with the finest compositions of Italy.

The violinist is not named, but commentators have suggested Geminiani, Dubourg or Clegg; as Talbot points out, it is unlikely to have been Geminiani, because of his known antipathy to Vivaldi. Transcriptions for harp of the third and fifth concertos survive in the collections of another celebrated blind harpist, the Welshman John Parry; they are held in the National Library of Wales in Aberystwyth. The 1797 Encyclopædia Britannica records that the fifth concerto was also played on an Irish variant of Benjamin Franklin's celebrated invention, the glass harmonica. Under the entry for Harmonica, a 35-glass harmonica is described, about which its inventor, the Dublin physician Edward Cullen, writes:{{

I myself, though very far from being an accomplished player, can with great ease go through all the parts of Fisher's celebrated rondeau; nay, I have heard the fifth concerto of Vivaldi played upon it with as much distinctness as upon a violin.

There were numerous arrangements for keyboard instruments in the eighteenth century, as described in the next section. One surviving eighteenth century transcription of Op. 3, No. 3 has been interpreted as an arrangement for glockenspiel. Themes from movements in the concertos were borrowed by other composers for vocal works: the opening themes from the last movement of Op. 3, No. 11 were borrowed by Bach for the first choral movement in his 1714 cantata Ich hatte viel Bekümmernis, BWV 21; and the opening motif of the first movement of the fifth concerto is quoted by Handel in the aria Tho' the honours in his 1750 oratorio Theodora. The most substantial borrowing occurred in the burletta The Golden Pippin, first performed in 1773 at the Theatre Royal, Covent Garden, with the music of various composers arranged by John Abraham Fisher. The first movement of the fifth concerto was arranged for the final number, a sextet for the principal characters, Jupiter, Juno, Pallas, Venus, Paris and the Dragon.

Op. 3, No. 6, RV 356, is an important piece in the Suzuki violin method, where students are first introduced to playing in a higher position.

== Transcriptions and arrangements for keyboard instruments ==
The many surviving transcriptions of Vivaldi's L'estro armonico reflect the immediate popularity of these works within his lifetime. As Talbot (2010) points out, Op. 3, No. 5, RV 519, by far the most popular concerto of the set in the British Isles, was so often performed in public and private that it was simply referred to as "Vivaldi's Fifth". The collection—and especially the fifth concerto—spawned many arrangements for keyboard instruments. (Arrangements for other instruments, such as the harp, or vocal ensembles are discussed in the previous section.) The great success of Vivaldi's concertos during his lifetime was matched by his rapid descent into obscurity after his death in 1741. As Vivaldi scholars agree, some of the earliest and most significant transcriptions—those made in Weimar in the 1710s by Johann Sebastian Bach as part of a series of arrangements for keyboard and organ of Italian and Italianate concertos—indirectly played a decisive role in restoring Vivaldi's reputation during the so-called "Vivaldi revival" in the twentieth century.

The Ryom-Verzeichnis, explained in detail in the two volumes Ryom (1986) and Ryom (2007), contains a summary of the known surviving publications, handwritten manuscript copies and arrangements of the concertos. Of these six were arranged by Bach: three of those for solo violin were arranged for harpsichord; two double violin concertos for organ (two keyboards and pedal); and one of the concertos for four violins was arranged for four harpsichords and orchestra. Four further keyboard arrangements appear in Anne Dawson's book, an English anthology dating from around 1720 of arrangements for clavichord, virginal or harpsichord prepared by an unknown hand. As Ryom (1986, pp. 616–617) points out, the fifth concerto Op. 3, No. 5, RV 519, is the unique concerto to have resulted in so many transcriptions: these are described in detail in Talbot (2010).

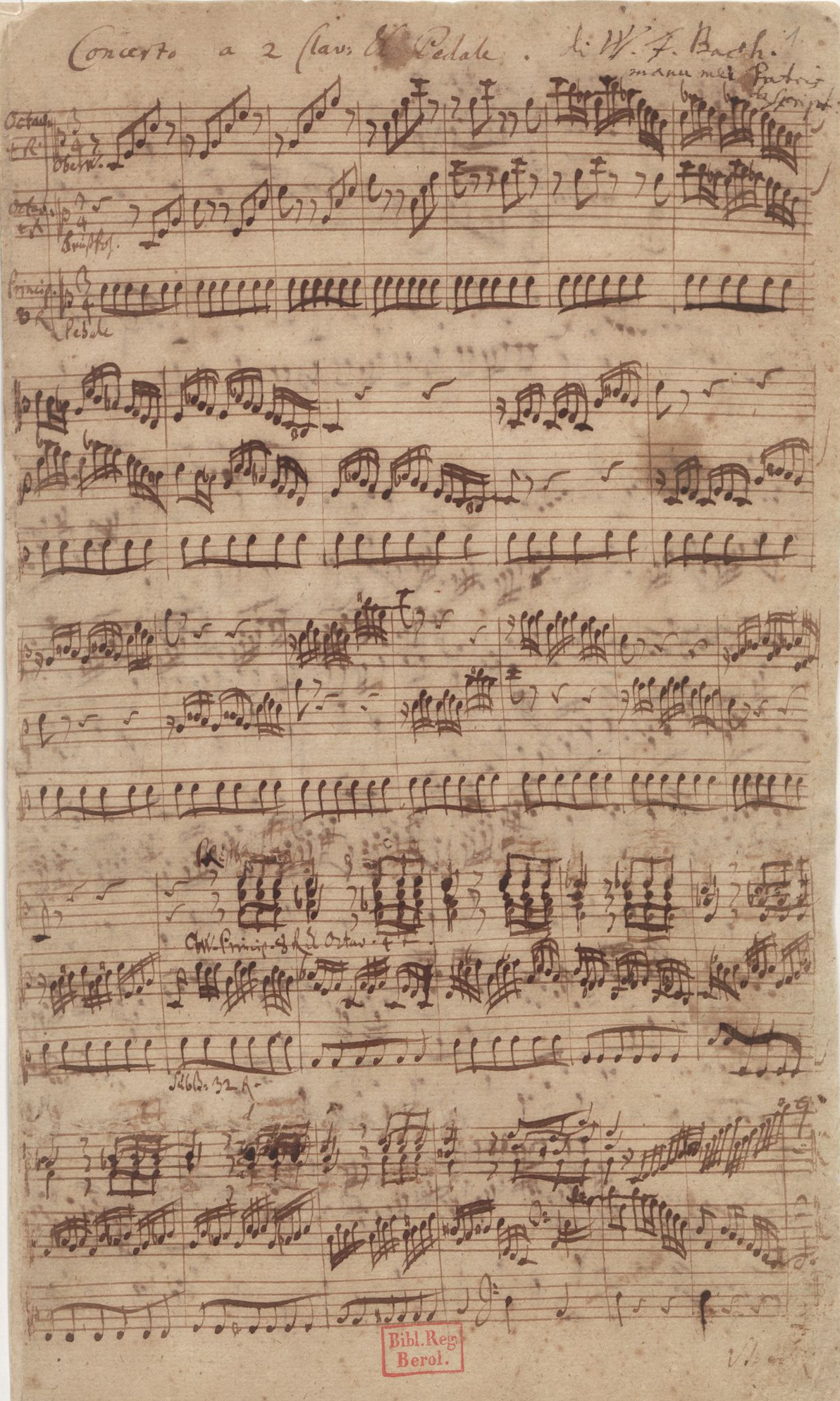
Autograph manuscript of BWV 596, Bach's transcription of Op. 3, No. 11, which became part of Wilhelm Friedemann Bach's repertoire.

The concerto transcriptions by Bach were probably made in Weimar where he was employed as court organist and later concertmaster in the period 1708–1717. It is thought likely that many of the transcriptions were made in 1713/1714, when Bach would have had access to a copy of L'estro armonico brought back to Weimar by the young Prince Johann Ernst of Saxe-Weimar after a two-year stay in the Netherlands. Bach made harpsichord arrangements of three of the concertos for solo violin:

- Op. 3, No. 3, RV 310, arranged as BWV 978
- Op. 3, No. 9, RV 230, arranged as BWV 972
- Op. 3, No. 12, RV 265, arranged as BWV 976

He arranged two of the double violin concertos for the organ, scored for two manuals and pedal:

- Op. 3, No. 8, RV 522, arranged as BWV 593
- Op. 3, No. 11, RV 565, arranged as BWV 596

There is a much later arrangement of one of the concertos for four violins as a concerto for four harpsichords and strings. It has been dated to Bach's period in Leipzig, probably in the late 1720s or early 1730s.

- Op. 3, No. 10, RV 580, arranged as BWV 1065

Bach's transcriptions were not widely disseminated. They were only published in the 1840s and 1850s by C. J. Peters in the editions prepared by Friedrich Konrad Griepenkerl—part of the nineteenth century "Bach revival". At that stage all of Bach's concerto transcriptions were described as "after Vivaldi", regardless of authorship. Problems with attribution were raised again by the new edition of the concerto transcriptions published by the Bach-Gesellschaft in the 1890s. The controversy that ensued in the 1910s in assessing their authorship and that of the original concertos sparked the Vivaldi revival, which involved a reevaluation of Vivaldi and the eventual rediscovery of his numerous "lost" works.

Anne Dawson's Book, part of a bequest of baroque musical manuscripts now held in the Henry Watson Music Library in Manchester, contains arrangements for single-manual instrument of the following concertos:

- Op. 3, No. 5, RV 519 (2 violins, violoncello)
- Op. 3, No. 7, RV 567 (4 violins)
- Op. 3, No. 9, RV 230 (solo violin)
- Op. 3, No. 12, RV 265 (solo violin)

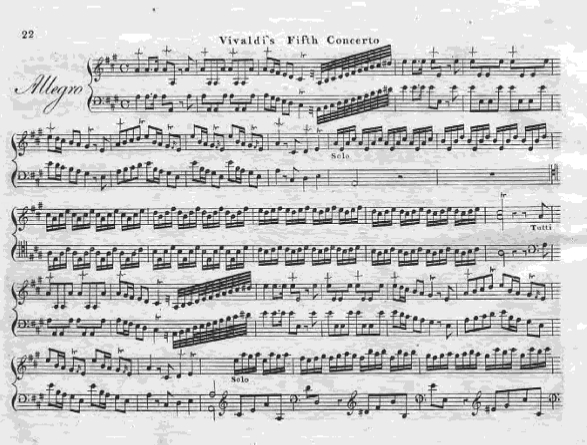
First movement of Vivaldi's 5th concerto from Agrell's Easy Genteel Lessons for the Harpsichord

Selfridge-Field describes these as replacing "the virile acrobatics of Vivaldi's violino principale [by] the gentle graces of virginal ornamentation: shakes, coulées, long apoggiaturas, and so forth".

Apart from the arrangement of RV 519 in Anne Dawson's Book, there were many others:

- A Collection of Easy Genteel Lessons for the Harpsichord composed by Giovanni Agrell, Book II, to which is added Vivaldi's Celebrated 5th Concerto, set for the Harpsichord, London, Randall and Abell, c. 1767. This skillful arrangement of RW 519, probably made by the Swedish composer Johan Agrell, is the only transcription of any concerto from L'estro armonico to be published in the eighteenth century.
- Concerto pro clavicembal del Sigr. Vivaldi, SchW A6:001, is Johann Adolph Scheibe's transcription of RV 519, realised between 1727 and 1735. The arranger's autograph, in the Berlin State Library, was identified by Russell Stinson in 1990. Transposed to the key of G major, it is a straightforward transcription which occasionally simplifies Vivaldi's score by omitting the second violin and viola parts.
- Ryom (2007) lists four further transcriptions. Talbot (2010) supplements Ryom's list with three further arrangements, all of them connected in some way to Britain.

== Discography ==
L'estro armonico in its entirety has been recorded several times by some of the world's leading orchestras and ensembles. Some notable interpretations include:

- The York String Quartet recorded Concerto No. 8, RV 522 around 1939.
- The Italian ensemble I Musici recorded the complete concertos twice, both for Philips Records: first in 1963 with Roberto Michelucci, then in 1984 with Pina Carmirelli.
- In 1973, the Academy of St Martin in the Fields under the direction of Sir Neville Marriner recorded the works for Decca Records with violinists Alan Loveday, Carmel Kaine and Iona Brown.
- With the rise of historically-informed performance, the concertos were frequently recorded by period instrument ensembles such as Christopher Hogwood and the Academy of Ancient Music (L'Oiseau-Lyre), Trevor Pinnock and the English Concert (Archiv Produktion), Fabio Biondi and Europa Galante (Erato), Jeanne Lamon and Tafelmusic,, Café Zimmermann, and Mercury Baroque.
- Italian conductor Federico Guglielmo recorded L'estro armonico with L'Arte dell'Arco in 2014 for his series of Vivaldi's complete orchestral works for Brilliant Classics. The same ensemble also recorded L'estro armonico with Christopher Hogwood for Chandos Chaconne.
- Ottavio Dantone made a recording with Accademia Bizantina.
- Rachel Podger's recording, described as "miracles of virtuosity" by The Observer, was named an editor's choice by Gramophone and a reference recording by Classics Today.
