= The Four Seasons (Vivaldi) =

Set of four concerti by Antonio Vivaldi

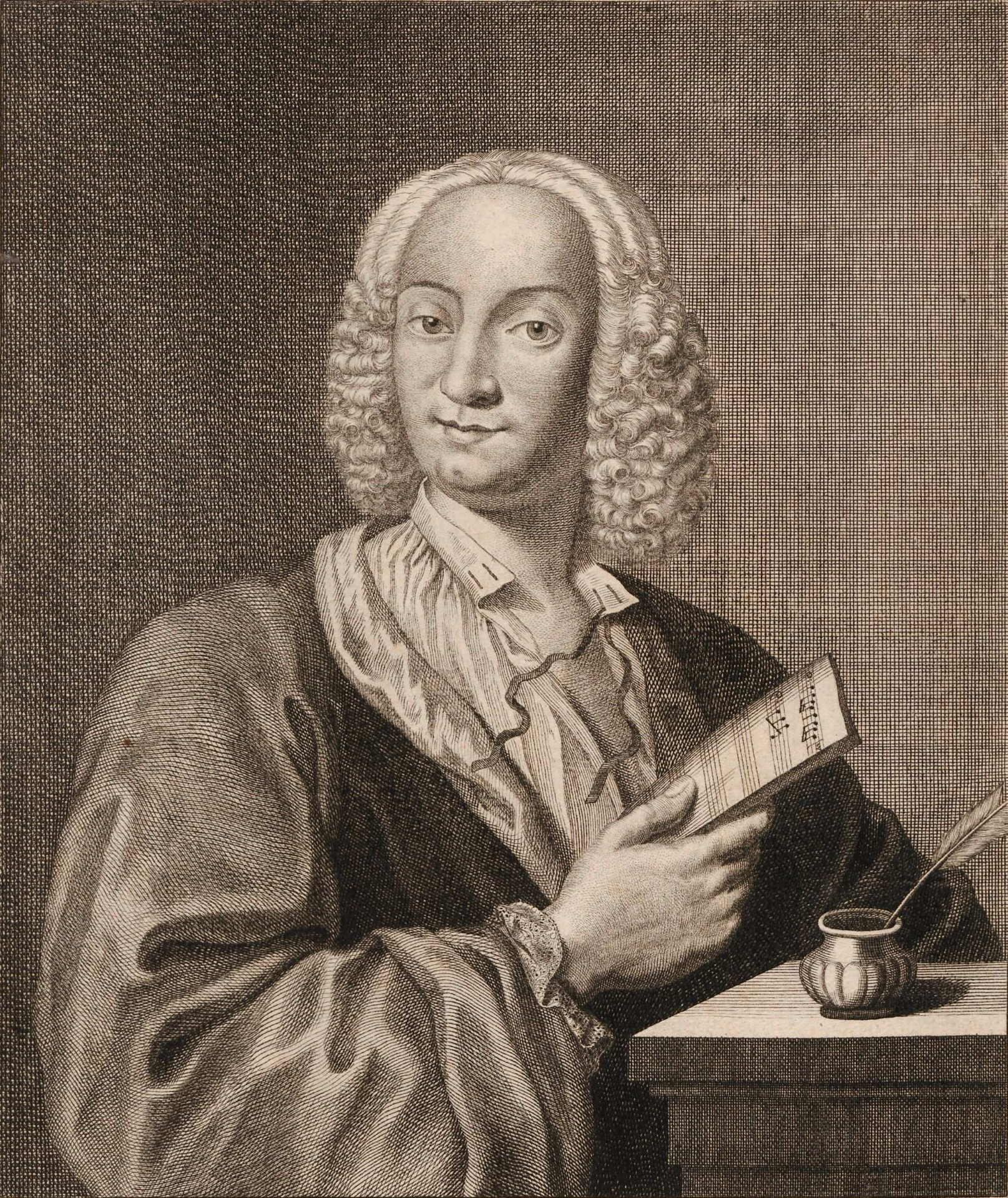
Antonio Vivaldi (engraving by François Morellon de La Cave, from Michel-Charles Le Cène's edition of Vivaldi's Op. 8, 1725)

The Four Seasons (Italian: Le quattro stagioni) is a group of four violin concerti by Italian composer Antonio Vivaldi, each of which gives musical expression to a season of the year. These were composed around 1718–1723, when Vivaldi was the court chapel master in Mantua. They were published in 1725 in Amsterdam in what was at the time the Dutch Republic, together with eight additional concerti, as Il cimento dell'armonia e dell'inventione (The Contest Between Harmony and Invention).

The Four Seasons is the best known of Vivaldi's works. The inspiration for the concertos is not the countryside around Mantua, as initially supposed, where Vivaldi was living at the time, since according to Karl Heller they could have been written as early as 1716–1717, while Vivaldi was engaged with the court of Mantua only in 1718.

They were a revolution in musical conception: Vivaldi represented flowing creeks, singing birds (of different species, each specifically characterized), a shepherd and his barking dog, buzzing flies, storms, drunken dancers, hunting parties from both the hunters' and the prey's point of view, frozen landscapes, and warm winter fires.

Unusual for the period, Vivaldi published the concerti with accompanying sonnets (possibly written by the composer himself) that elucidated what it was in the spirit of each season that his music was intended to evoke. The concerti therefore stand as one of the earliest and most detailed examples of what would come to be called program music—in other words, music with a narrative element. Vivaldi took great pains to relate his music to the texts of the poems, translating the poetic lines themselves directly into the music on the page. For example, in the second movement of "Spring", when the goatherd sleeps, his barking dog can be heard in the viola section. The music is elsewhere similarly evocative of other natural sounds. Vivaldi divided each concerto into three movements (fast–slow–fast), and, likewise, each linked sonnet into three sections.

== Structure ==
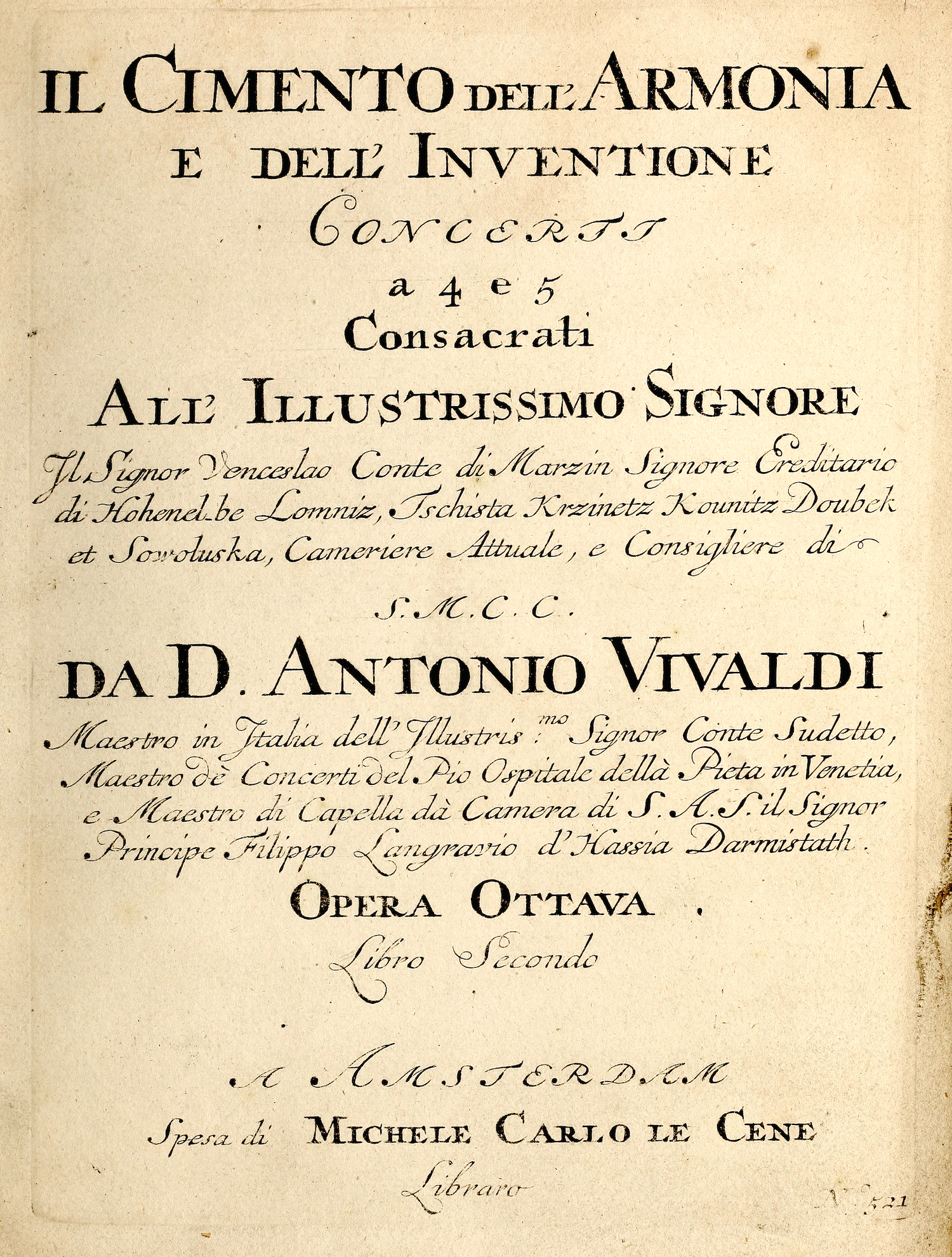
Title page of Vivaldi's Cimento dell'Armonia e dell'Invenzione, which included The Four Seasons

"L'inverno" (Winter), First movement, Allegro non molto (3:18)
Performed by the United States Air Force Band

Vivaldi's arrangement is as follows:

1. Concerto No. 1 in E major, Op. 8, RV 269, "Spring" (La primavera)
  1. Allegro (in E major)
  2. Largo e pianissimo sempre (in C♯ minor)
  3. Allegro pastorale (in E major)
2. Concerto No. 2 in G minor, Op. 8, RV 315, "Summer" (L'estate)
  1. Allegro non molto (in G minor)
  2. Adagio e piano – Presto e forte (in G minor)
  3. Presto (in G minor)
3. Concerto No. 3 in F major, Op. 8, RV 293, "Autumn" (L'autunno)
  1. Allegro (in F major)
  2. Adagio molto (in D minor)
  3. Allegro (in F major)
4. Concerto No. 4 in F minor, Op. 8, RV 297, "Winter" (L'inverno)
  1. Allegro non molto (in F minor)
  2. Largo (in E♭ major)
  3. Allegro (in F minor)

A performance of all four concerti may take about 40–43 minutes. Approximate timings of the individual concerti:

1. Spring: 10 minutes
2. Summer: 11 minutes
3. Autumn: 11 minutes
4. Winter: 9 minutes

== Sonnets and allusions ==
Concerto No. 1 in E major, "La primavera" (Spring)
I. Allegro

II. Largo

III. Allegro

Concerto No. 2 in G minor, "L'estate" (Summer)
I. Allegro non molto

II. Adagio

III. Presto

Concerto No. 3 in F major, "L'autunno" (Autumn)
I. Allegro

II. Adagio molto

III. Allegro

Concerto No. 4 in F minor, "L'inverno" (Winter)
I. Allegro non molto

II. Largo

III. Allegro
All performed by the Wichita State University Chamber Players, an ensemble of the Wichita Symphony Orchestra

There is some debate as to whether the four concerti were written to accompany four sonnets or vice versa. Though it is not known who wrote the accompanying sonnets, the theory that Vivaldi wrote them is supported by the fact that each sonnet is broken into three sections, each neatly corresponding to a movement in the concerto. Regardless of the sonnets' authorship, The Four Seasons can be classified as program music, instrumental music intended to evoke something extra-musical, and an art form which Vivaldi was determined to prove sophisticated enough to be taken seriously.

In addition to these sonnets, Vivaldi provided instructions such as "The barking dog" (in the second movement of "Spring"), "Languor caused by the heat" (in the first movement of "Summer"), and "the drunkards have fallen asleep" (in the second movement of "Autumn").

A new translation of the sonnets into English by Armand D'Angour was published in 2019.

=== Sonnet text ===
Sonnet	Italian	English
Spring	Allegro; Giunt' è la Primavera e festosetti La Salutan gl' Augei con lieto canto, E i fonti allo Spirar de' Zeffiretti; Con dolce mormorio Scorrono intanto: Vengon' coprendo l' aer di nero amanto E Lampi, e tuoni ad annuntiarla eletti Indi tacendo questi, gl' Augelletti; Tornan' di nuovo al lor canoro incanto: Largo; E quindi sul fiorito ameno prato Al caro mormorio di fronde e piante Dorme 'l Caprar col fido can' à lato. Allegro; Di pastoral Zampogna al suon festante Danzan Ninfe e Pastor nel tetto amato Di primavera all' apparir brillante.	Allegro; Springtime is upon us. The birds celebrate her return with festive song, and murmuring streams are softly caressed by the breezes. Thunderstorms, those heralds of Spring, roar, casting their dark mantle over heaven, Then they die away to silence, and the birds take up their charming songs once more. Largo; On the flower-strewn meadow, with leafy branches rustling overhead, the goat-herd sleeps, his faithful dog beside him. Allegro; Led by the festive sound of rustic bagpipes, nymphs and shepherds lightly dance beneath spring's beautiful canopy.
Summer	Allegro non molto Sotto dura Staggion dal Sole accesa Langue l' huom, langue 'l gregge, ed arde il Pino; Scioglie il Cucco la Voce, e tosto intesa Canta la Tortorella e 'l gardelino. Zeffiro dolce Spira, mà contesa Muove Borea improviso al Suo vicino; E piange il Pastorel, perche sospesa Teme fiera borasca, e 'l suo destino; Adagio e piano – Presto e forte Toglie alle membra lasse il Suo riposo Il timore de' Lampi, e tuoni fieri E de mosche, e mosconi il Stuol furioso! Presto; Ah, che pur troppo i Suo timor Son veri Tuona e fulmina il Ciel e grandinoso Tronca il capo alle Spiche e a' grani alteri.	Allegro non molto Under a hard season, fired up by the sun Languishes man, languishes the flock and burns the pine We hear the cuckoo's voice; then sweet songs of the turtledove and finch are heard. Soft breezes stir the air, but threatening the North Wind sweeps them suddenly aside. The shepherd trembles, fearing violent storms and his fate. Adagio e piano – Presto e forte The fear of lightning and fierce thunder Robs his tired limbs of rest As gnats and flies buzz furiously around. Presto; Alas, his fears were justified The Heavens thunder and roar and with hail Cut the head off the wheat and damages the grain.
Autumn	Allegro; Celebra il Vilanel con balli e Canti; Del felice raccolto il bel piacere E del liquor de Bacco accesi tanti Finiscono col Sonno il lor godere. Adagio molto Fà ch' ogn' uno tralasci e balli e canti L' aria che temperata dà piacere, E la Staggion ch' invita tanti e tanti D' un dolcissimo Sonno al bel godere. Allegro cacciator alla nov' alba à caccia Con corni, Schioppi, e cani escono fuore Fugge la belva, e Seguono la traccia; Già Sbigottita, e lassa al gran rumore De' Schioppi e cani, ferita minaccia Languida di fuggir, mà oppressa muore.	Allegro; The peasant celebrates, with songs and dances, The pleasure of a bountiful harvest. And fired up by Bacchus' liquor, many end their revelry in sleep. Adagio molto Everyone is made to forget their cares and to sing and dance By the air which is tempered with pleasure And (by) the season that invites so many, many Out of their sweetest slumber to fine enjoyment Allegro; The hunters emerge at the new dawn, And with horns and dogs and guns depart upon their hunting The beast flees and they follow its trail; Terrified and tired of the great noise Of guns and dogs, the beast, wounded, threatens Languidly to flee, but harried, dies.
Winter	Allegro non molto Agghiacciato tremar trà nevi algenti Al Severo Spirar d' orrido Vento, Correr battendo i piedi ogni momento; E pel Soverchio gel batter i denti; Largo; Passar al foco i dì quieti e contenti Mentre la pioggia fuor bagna ben cento Allegro; Caminar Sopra il giaccio, e à passo lento Per timor di cader girsene intenti; Gir forte Sdruzziolar, cader à terra Di nuove ir Sopra 'l giaccio e correr forte Sin ch' il giaccio si rompe, e si disserra; Sentir uscir dalle ferrate porte Sirocco, Borea, e tutti i Venti in guerra Quest' é 'l verno, mà tal, che gioja apporte.	Allegro non molto To tremble from cold in the icy snow, In the harsh breath of a horrid wind; To run, stamping one's feet every moment, Our teeth chattering in the extreme cold Largo; Before the fire to pass peaceful, Contented days while the rain outside pours down. Allegro; We tread the icy path slowly and cautiously, for fear of tripping and falling. Then turn abruptly, slip, crash on the ground and, rising, hasten on across the ice lest it cracks up. We feel the chill north winds course through the home despite the locked and bolted doors... The desert wind, the North wind and all the winds at war this is winter, which nonetheless brings its own delights.

== Recording history ==
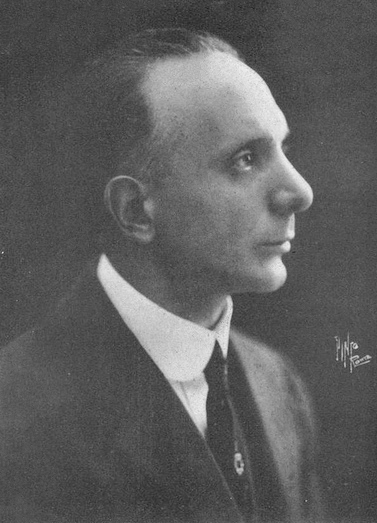
Bernardino Molinari, who made the first electrical recording of The Four Seasons in 1942.

The date and personnel on the first recording of The Four Seasons are disputed. There is a compact disc of a recording made by the violinist Alfredo Campoli taken from acetates of a French radio broadcast; these are thought to date from early in 1939. The first proper electrical recording was made in 1942 by Bernardino Molinari; though his is a somewhat different interpretation from modern performances, it is clearly recognisable as The Four Seasons. Molinari's recording was made for Cetra, and was issued in Italy and subsequently in the United States on six double-sided 78s, in the 1940s. It was then reissued on long-playing album in 1950, and, later, on compact disc.

The first American recording was made in the final week of 1947 by the violinist Louis Kaufman. The recording was made at Carnegie Hall in advance of a scheduled recording ban effective 1 January 1948. The performers were The Concert Hall Chamber Orchestra under Henry Swoboda, Edith Weiss-Mann (harpsichord) and Edouard Nies-Berger (organ). This recording helped the re-popularisation of Vivaldi's music in the mainstream repertoire of Europe and America following on the work done by Molinari and others in Italy. It won the French Grand Prix du Disque in 1950, was elected to the Grammy Hall of Fame in 2002, and was selected the following year for the National Recording Registry in the Library of Congress. Kaufman, intrigued to learn that the four concertos were in fact part of a set of twelve, set about finding a full score and eventually recorded the other eight concertos in Zürich in 1950, making his the first recording of Vivaldi's complete Op. 8.

The ensemble I Musici has recorded The Four Seasons probably more often than any other established musical group to date: The debut recording in 1955 with Felix Ayo; again with Ayo in 1959, this time in stereo — the very first stereo recording of the work; subsequent recordings featuring Roberto Michelucci (1969), the highly acclaimed 1982 recording with Pina Carmirelli, Federico Agostini (1988), Mariana Sîrbu (1995), Antonio Anselmi (2012) and Marco Fiorini (2021). There is also a video recording of The Four Seasons performed by I Musici in Antonio Vivaldi's hometown of Venice, filmed by Anton van Munster in 1988.

The 1969 Argo recording by the Academy of St. Martin-in-the-Fields conducted by Neville Marriner and featuring the soloist Alan Loveday sold over half a million copies; it became the ensemble's first gold record.

I Solisti di Zagreb, under the baton of Antonio Janigro with Jan Tomasow as violin soloist and Anton Heiller on harpsichord, followed in 1957 on the Vanguard label, further reissued under the Philips and other labels. Wilfrid Mellers, an English music critic, musicologist and composer wrote of this performance, "the soloists phrase their lyricism beautifully." John Thornton wrote about this recording, "Here is matchless ensemble playing, topped by Tomasow's secure playing. Janigro reveals his talent for conducting, which competes with his considerable talent for cello playing."

Ivan Supek wrote of this recording:

I will attempt to convey to you how much this performance means to me, and might mean to you, as well. My first encounter with the records took place almost thirty years ago, when "our" Antonio revealed to me the true significance of the piece of another great Antonio, his famous namesake, whose Le Quattro Staggioni I could hardly listen any more because of the "grand", actually too grand, performances usual at that time, let alone enjoy them. What a change it was – a window into a new world; music is fast, precise and true to life, the intonation is correct, the continuo appropriate, and the violin of beautiful sound in fitting correlation with the Zagreb Soloists. The self-assured and fine tone of Jan Tomasow's solo violin relates perfectly with the Soloists; the entire performance is impregnated with the spirit of Janigro's perfectionism, leaving the music and its soul fully exposed. It had been for a long time the only performance I could listen to. Only during [the] last decade some new kids, playing authentic instruments, have offered to me similar pleasure and insights into the music of Antonio Vivaldi and, to my great pleasure, Janigro's performance is no longer the only choice for me. In my opinion, this also shows how Janigro's performance in cooperation with the Zagreb Soloists was far ahead its time, as corroborated by Igor Stravinsky, who claimed that it was the most beautiful performance of Le Quattro Staggioni he had ever heard, a statement which I only recently learned about. No wonder, since such "bareness" and precision of Janigro's interpretation must have appealed to him. It was much later that I discovered the excellence of the recording as well. At that time, the Zagreb Soloists were recording for Vanguard, mostly in Vienna at various locations, and this particular recording was made in 1957 at Rotenturmstrassaal. Recording was produced by Seymour Solomon, chief producer of the entire edition, who would personally come from the USA to oversee every recording to be made by the Zagreb Soloists, whereas the Vanguard branch in Vienna "Amadeo" was in charge of the organisation. (My gratitude to one of the founders of the Zagreb Soloists, Mr. Stjepan Aranjoš, for providing me with some important insights). Janigro was a perfectionist, often rather merciless, not only in matters of music but also in terms of the sound, so he participated directly and intensely in [the] recording process, which was quite uncommon at that time. All that great care, by all participants in the project, is amply reflected in the recording itself, resulting in an airy performance of appropriate spaciousness and extension, with only occasional "congestion" of high tones in forte sections.

Paul Shoemaker wrote about this recording:

Nothing I have heard changes my view that the best Seasons ever was performed by Jan Tomasow and I Solisti di Zagreb and beautifully recorded by Vanguard at the very beginning of the stereo era. If you have almost every other version of the Seasons, you'll want this one, too. If money and space are no obstacle, it might be worth having.

Nigel Kennedy's 1989 recording of The Four Seasons with the English Chamber Orchestra sold over three million copies worldwide, becoming one of the best-selling classical works ever. The marketing of Kennedy's record was described as "the first time that a classical artist had been given the full pop marketing treatment", with a promotional single, and advertisements on billboards, TV and radio.

Gil Shaham and the Orpheus Chamber Orchestra recorded The Four Seasons as well as a music video for the first movement of "Winter" that was featured regularly on The Weather Channel in the mid-1990s.

Surround sound versions of the piece have been issued on Super Audio CD by Richard Tognetti, Pinchas Zukerman, Jonathan Carney and Rachel Podger.

The World's Encyclopedia of Recorded Music in 1952 cites only two recordings of The Four Seasons – by Molinari and Kaufman. By 2011, approximately 1,000 recorded versions have been made since Campoli's in 1939.

In 2009, all four concertos were arranged for piano by pianist Jeffrey Biegel.

In 2023, Gramophone Magazine named La Serenissima's recording of the Manchester version of The Four Seasons as "potentially the most streamed interpretation ever." with over 165 million streams on Spotify alone.

Classical musicians have sought to distinguish their recordings of The Four Seasons, with historically informed performances, and embellishments, to the point of varying the instruments and tempi, or playing notes differently from the listener's expectation (whether specified by the composer or not). It is said that Vivaldi's work presents such opportunities for improvisation. Many period-based ensembles have recorded The Four Seasons, including La Serenissima under the direction of Adrian Chandler who recorded the Manchester version of The Four Seasons, The English Concert under the direction of Trevor Pinnock, the Academy of Ancient Music under the direction of Christopher Hogwood and Europa Galante under the direction of Fabio Biondi.

== Reception ==
The Four Seasons was voted #67 in the Classic FM Hall of Fame. Three of the four concerti were included in the Classic 100 Concerto listing.

== Derivative works ==
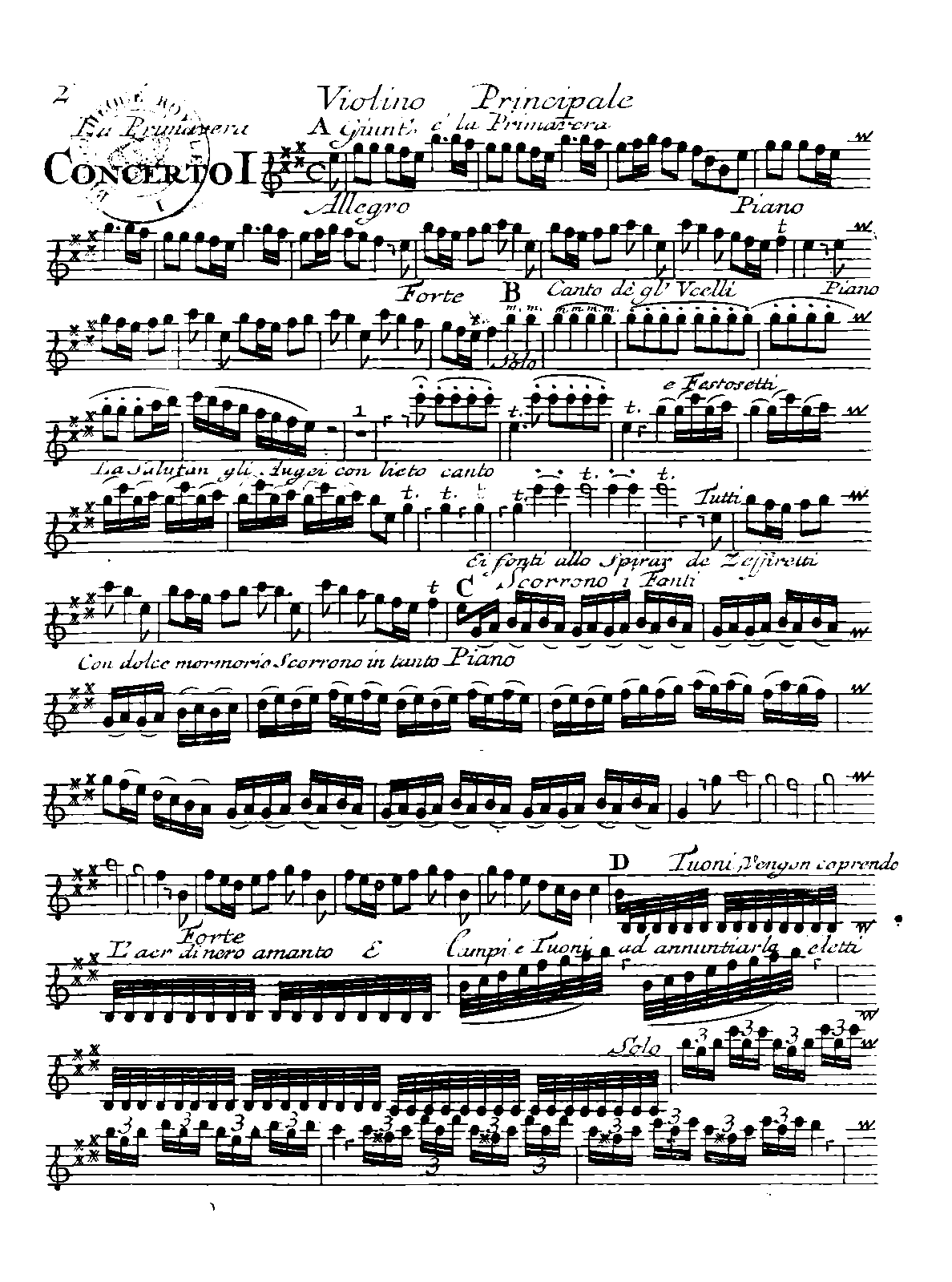
First edition version of the piece, published in 1725 by Michel-Charles Le Cène in Amsterdam.

Derivative works of these concerti include arrangements, transcriptions, covers, remixes, samples, and parodies in music — themes in theater and opera, soundtracks in films (or video games), and choreography in ballet (along with contemporary dance, figure skating, rhythmic gymnastics, synchronized swimming, etc.) — either in their entirety, single movements, or medleys. Antonio Vivaldi appears to have started this trend of adapting music from The Four Seasons, and since then it has expanded into many aspects of the performing arts (as have other instrumental & vocal works by the composer). This contest between harmony and invention (as it were) now involves various genres around the world:

1726 (or 1734)

- Vivaldi re-scored the Allegro movement from the "Spring" concerto, both as the opening sinfonia (third movement), and chorus (adding lyrics) for his opera Dorilla in Tempe.
- J. S. Bach used the initial motif of the first movement of the "Spring" concerto for the third movement (aria) of his cantata Wer weiß, wie nahe mir mein Ende? (BWV 27).

1727 (or 1730, 1731)

- Vivaldi based his setting of "Gelido in ogni vena", an aria from Metastasio's Siroe, re di Persia libretto, on the first movement of the "Winter" concerto. Vivaldi's Siroe, containing an aria on this text, premiered in 1727 (music lost). An aria on the "Gelido in ogni vena" text also appeared in his 1730 Argippo (music lost). In 1731, he inserted the extant version of this aria in his Farnace when this opera was restaged in Pavia.

1739

- Nicolas Chédeville (France) arranged the concerti (as "Le printemps, ou Les saisons amusantes") for hurdy-gurdy or musette, violin, flute, and continuo.

1765

- The French composer Michel Corrette composed and published a choral motet, Laudate Dominum de Coelis, subtitled Motet à Grand Chœur arrangé dans le Concerto de Printemps de Vivaldi. The work, for choir and orchestra, consists of the words of Psalm 148 set to the music from the Spring concerto with vocal soloists singing the solo concerto parts.

1775

- Jean-Jacques Rousseau published his flute version of the "Spring" concerto.

1969

- The Swingle Singers (France) recorded an album (The Joy of Singing) based on the work (and that of other composers).

1970

- Astor Piazzolla (Argentina) published Estaciones Porteñas, "The Four Seasons of Buenos Aires"; these have been included in "eight seasons" performances, along with Vivaldi's work, by various artists.

1972

- Moe Koffman (Canada) recorded a jazz album of the concerti.

1976

- The New Koto Ensemble (Japan) recorded the concerti on koto instruments.

1978

- Michael Franks (United States) composed a vocal serenade based on the theme of the Adagio from the "Summer" concerto. This was subsequently covered by WoongSan (Korea) in 2010.

1981

- The Four Seasons is used in the eponymous 1981 film, along with other Vivaldi concertos for flute.

1982

- Patrick Gleeson (United States) recorded a "computer realization" of the concerti.

1984

- Thomas Wilbrandt (West Germany) composed and recorded "The Electric V" (later adapted for film), which interprets Vivaldi's work with ambient electronics, vocals, and samples of the original concerti.
- Roland Petit (France) choreographed a ballet (entitled "Les Quatre Saisons") to an I Musici performance of Vivaldi's work.

1987

- Ben Shedd (United States) produced a scenic tour of nature with the concerti as background music (narrated by William Shatner).

1990

- A MIDI arrangement of the "Spring" concerto by Passport Designs was included with Windows 3.0.

1993

- Jean-Pierre Rampal (France) recorded arrangements of the concerti for flute; these were also recorded by Jadwiga Kotnowska.

1995

- Arnie Roth (United States) recorded "The Four Seasons Suite", including sonnets (recited by Patrick Stewart). This may not qualify as a derivative work, depending on whether Vivaldi's translated sonnets were meant to be narrated with the music (versus being read in Italian, or silently by the audience).

1997

- The Baronics (Canada) recorded surf guitar versions of one movement from each of the concerti.
- French musician Jacques Loussier composed and recorded, with his trio, jazz-swing interpretations of the concerti.

1998

- The Great Kat (England/United States) recorded a shred guitar (and violin) version of the Presto movement from the "Summer" concerto.
- Vanessa-Mae (Singapore/Britain) recorded a crossover version of the same movement for electric violin.

1999

- The Chinese Baroque Players recorded arrangements of the concerti for traditional Chinese instruments.
- Petrova & Tikhonov (Russia) performed their long program to a medley of Vivaldi's seasons to win the European Figure Skating Championships.

2000

- Venice Harp Quartet (Italy) recorded arrangements of the concerti for harp ensemble.
- Gustavo Montesano (Argentina) recorded a tango guitar version of the "Spring" Allegro with the Royal Philharmonic Orchestra.
- Jochen Brusch (Germany) & Sven-Ingvart Mikkelsen (Denmark) recorded arrangements of the concerti for violin and organ.

2001

- Ferhan & Ferzan Önder (Turkish twin sisters) recorded a transcription of the concerti for two pianos by Antun Tomislav Šaban.
- Susan Osborn (United States) recorded a new-age vocal serenade based on the "Winter" Largo.
- The Charades (Finland) recorded the Presto from the "Summer" concerto as "Summer Twist", for surf guitar ensemble.

2003

- Red Priest (UK) recorded arrangements of the concerti for recorder.
- RCA Records released Vivaldi's Greatest Hit: The Ultimate Four Seasons, a 23-track album containing all four violin concerti and eleven different musicians' cover versions of selected movements. The album cover was illustrated by MUTTS creator Patrick McDonnell.
- A muzak version of the "Spring" concerto is heard in The Simpsons: Hit & Run when the player is in the Stonecutter's Tunnel.
- Hayley Westenra (New Zealand) adapted the "Winter" concerto into a song titled "River of Dreams" which is sung in English. It was recorded for her Pure album on July 10.

2004

- Tafelmusik (Canada) arranged a cross-cultural arts special based on the concerti, involving a Chinese pipa, Indian sarangi and Inuit throat-singing.

2005

- Dark Moor (Spain) recorded an electric-guitar version of the Allegro non molto movement from the "Winter" concerto; this was later integrated into the Finnish video game Frets on Fire.

2006

- Accentus chamber choir (France) recorded a choral version of the "Winter" concerto.

2007

- Celtic Woman (Ireland) recorded the "Winter" Largo with vocals (Italian lyrics). The youngest former member, Chloë Agnew, originally recorded it for her Walking in the Air album which was released in 2002.
- PercaDu (Israel) performed an arrangement of the Allegro non molto movement from the "Winter" concerto, for marimbas with chamber orchestra.
- Mauro Bigonzetti (Italy) choreographed a ballet of the concerti for a French-Canadian dance company.
- Tim Slade (Australia) directed 4, a documentary which follows four classical violinists in their homelands (of Tokyo; Thursday Island, New York; and Lapland), as they relate to Vivaldi's Four Seasons.
- Seoul Metropolitan Traditional Music Orchestra performed the concerti with arrangement for Korean traditional music (gugak) orchestra by Seong-gi Kim. It was recorded live and released with CD from Synnara Music same year.

2008

- Sveceny & Dvorak (Czech Republic) produced both an album and stage production of world music based on the concerti.
- Yves Custeau (Canada) recorded a rock & roll "one-man band" version of the "Spring" Allegro.
- Daisy Jopling (England/United States) recorded a violin & hip-hop version of the Allegro non molto movement from the "Winter" concerto, and also performs it reggae-style.
- Innesa Tymochko (Ukraine) performed her crossover version of the Presto from the "Summer" concerto, for violin.
- Wez Bolton (Isle of Man) recorded a cover version of the Allegro non molto movement from the "Winter" concerto, based on the Japanese video game "Beatmania" remix.
- Patrick Chan (Canada) performed his long program to a medley of the concerti to win the Canadian Figure Skating Championships.

2009

- Absynth Against Anguish (Romania) produced an electronic (trance) version of the concerti.
- Riccardo Arrighini (Italy) recorded the concerti for solo piano, in a jazz style.
- Christophe Monniot recorded ambient-jazz interpretations of the concerti.
- Christian Blind (France) recorded a surf guitar/acid rock version of the Allegro movement from the "Spring" concerto.

2010

- Art Color Ballet (Poland) performed their "4 elements" show to the Presto movement from the "Summer" concerto, arranged by Hadrian Filip Tabęcki (Kameleon).
- David Garrett (Germany) recorded a crossover version of Vivaldi's winter (allegro non molto), combining classical violin with modern rock music.

2011

- Black Smith (Russia) performed the Presto movement from the "Summer" concerto in the style of thrash metal music (likewise, this movement has been covered numerous times by aspiring electric guitar virtuosos, and other crossover musicians).
- Angels (Greece) performed their crossover version of the same movement, scored for electric strings.
- Szentpeteri Csilla (Hungary) performed her crossover version of the same movement, scored for piano.
- Leonel Valbom (Portugal) remixed the Presto movement from the "Summer" concerto with VST Synths.
- Tim Kliphuis (Netherlands) performed the Allegro from the "Spring" movement as a crossover of world-music styles.
- Niibori Guitar Ensemble (Japan) Performed the Presto from the "Summer" movement as an arrangement for their concert at the Minato Mirai Hall on 1 June 2011

2012

- Russian violinist Olga Kholodnaya and Argentinian drummer Marino Colina arranged and recorded live in Berlin a version for violin and drum kit.
- German-born British composer Max Richter created a postmodern and minimalist recomposition, Recomposed by Max Richter: Vivaldi – The Four Seasons. Working with solo violinist Daniel Hope, Richter discarded around 75 per cent of the original source material; the album is 44 minutes long.
- Aura (Japan) recorded an a cappella arrangement of the concerti, and had also performed Vivaldi's Spring chorus (from Dorilla in Tempe) on a prior album.
- Sinfonity (Spain) performed the concerti for "electric-guitar orchestra".
- Bachod Chirmof (USA) produced a MIDI recording & animation of Vivaldi's winter (movements I & III).
- Tornado Classic (Russia) performed the Presto movement from the "Summer" concerto, with electric guitar and slap bass.
- The symphonic rock band Trans-Siberian Orchestra used a portion of the first movement of the "Winter" concerto in their song "Dreams of Fireflies (On A Christmas Night)" on their Dreams of Fireflies EP.

2013

- Richard Galliano (France) recorded the concerti for accordion, as well as a few of his opera arias on the instrument.
- Vito Paternoster (Italy) recorded the concerti in the form of sonatas for cello.
- Periodic (Germany) produced a megamix of the concerti, which incorporates electronica with samples of a classical recording.
- Steven Buchanan (USA) produced a tetralogy of "midseasons" (slow movements and corresponding sonnets) from Vivaldi's program music.
- William Harvey (USA) conducts the Afghan Youth Orchestra, the primary ensemble of Afghanistan National Institute of Music, in his composition "The Four Seasons of Afghanistan" at the Kennedy Center and Carnegie Hall.

2014

- The Piano Guys (USA) recorded an arrangement for piano and cello, a crossover between the "Winter" concerto and "Let it Go" from the animated film Frozen.

2015

- Zozimo Rech and Adrianne Simioni (Brazil) recorded the concerti on electric and acoustic guitar on the Astronomusic label.

2016

- In April, violist David Aaron Carpenter recorded the concerti, arranged for viola and released with an arrangement of Piazzolla's Estaciones Porteñas and The Four Seasons of Manhattan by Alexey Shor.
- Canadian choreographer Crystal Pite premiered her ballet based on the concerti, The Seasons' Canon, with the Paris Opera Ballet at the Palais Garnier before bringing it to the Royal Ballet in London.

2019

- "For Seasons" is a recomposition of Vivaldi's concertos using algorithms to portray climate change from 1725 to 2019. Recomposed by the creative studio Kling Klang Klong, arranged by Simone Candotto and performed in November 2019 by the NDR Elbphilharmonie Orchestra, under the direction of Alan Gilbert.
- Portrait of a Lady on Fire used La Serenissima's Four Seasons as part of their film soundtrack.
- Winter is used in John Wick: Chapter 3 – Parabellum during the assault in the Continental by Zero and his students

2021

- Ballet Arizona performed original choreography by artistic director Ib Andersen in an outdoor performance set against the lush Southwest landscape of the Desert Botanical Gardens.
- "The [Uncertain] Four Seasons" is a reworking of Vivaldi's original, by both human composers and AI algorithms based on climate predictions for the year 2050. Each performance is modified to fit the climatic predictions for the location of performance. The project includes a multi-orchestra, streamed event planned for November 1, 2021, in connection with the United Nations Climate Change conference held in Glasgow, Scotland. It was inspired by the 2019 performance, "For Seasons."
- ATEEZ incorporated the "Summer" concerto into their cover of iKON's "Rhythm Ta" on Kingdom: Legendary War.

2022

- The Brazilian telenovela Quanto Mais Vida, Melhor! covered the "Summer" concerto for a special sequence where the four main characters "switch bodies". For the scene, the compositions also had different rhythms involving rock, classical music, pop, and samba, respectively.
- Vivaldi and Italian Baroque specialists, La Serenissima (UK), "Winter" from the Manchester version of The Four Seasons was sampled in a Beats by Dre advertisement.
- The eponymous heroine of Wednesday plays Winter at the cello. (episode 3)
- The song "Tastes Like Pain" on SZNZ: Autumn by Weezer is based around the first movement of the "Winter" concerto.

2023

- A song "A Dramatic Irony" contains sampled elements mainly from Winter and parts of Summer can be heard in Kafka's character introduction trailer from the game Honkai: Star Rail.

2024

- As part of The Poetic Edda, and EP released by American deathcore bands Disembodied Tyrant and Synestia, the song "Winter" was used and melded with the deathcore style.

2025

- Commissioned to the mark the 300-year anniversary of the publication of the original concerti, 'A Season to Sing' is a choral reimagining of the work for SATB or upper voice choir by Joanna Forbes L'Estrange and published by the Royal School of Church Music. The work sets the melodies to seasonal texts from the Bible, poetry, and L'Estrange's own texts.
- The Four Seasons is featured again in the Netflix series The Four Seasons based on the 1981 film.
- "VIVA!", a song performed by Chiemi Tanaka and Moeka Koizumi as their respective characters from the anime franchise Love Live! Nijigasaki High School Idol Club, is a re-arrangement of Spring. Vivaldi is credited as the song's composer, his first registered full composer credit since 1739's Feraspe (currently lost opera).
- In December 2025, Opera Philadelphia staged an opera adaptation, The Seasons, at the Kimmel Center which expanded the work around the theme of climate change; crafting a pastiche by combing opera arias by Vivaldi with the complete music from The Four Seasons. It was conceptualized by the work's librettist, the playwright Sarah Ruhl, and Opera Philadelphia director, Anthony Roth Costanzo. The opera was directed by Zack Winokur; choreographed by Pam Tanowitz; conducted by Corrado Rovaris; and starred Costanzo as The Poet, Abigail Raiford as the Farmer, Kangmin Justin Kim as the Painter, Whitney Morrison as the Performing Artist, John Mburu as The Cosmic Weatherman, and Megan Moore as The Choreographer. There were also several dancers featured in the production.
