= Historical recording =

Historical recording may refer to:

- Grammy Award for Best Historical Album, historical reissue of pop albums
- Historical classical music recordings
