= Boccherini Quintet =

Italian string quartet

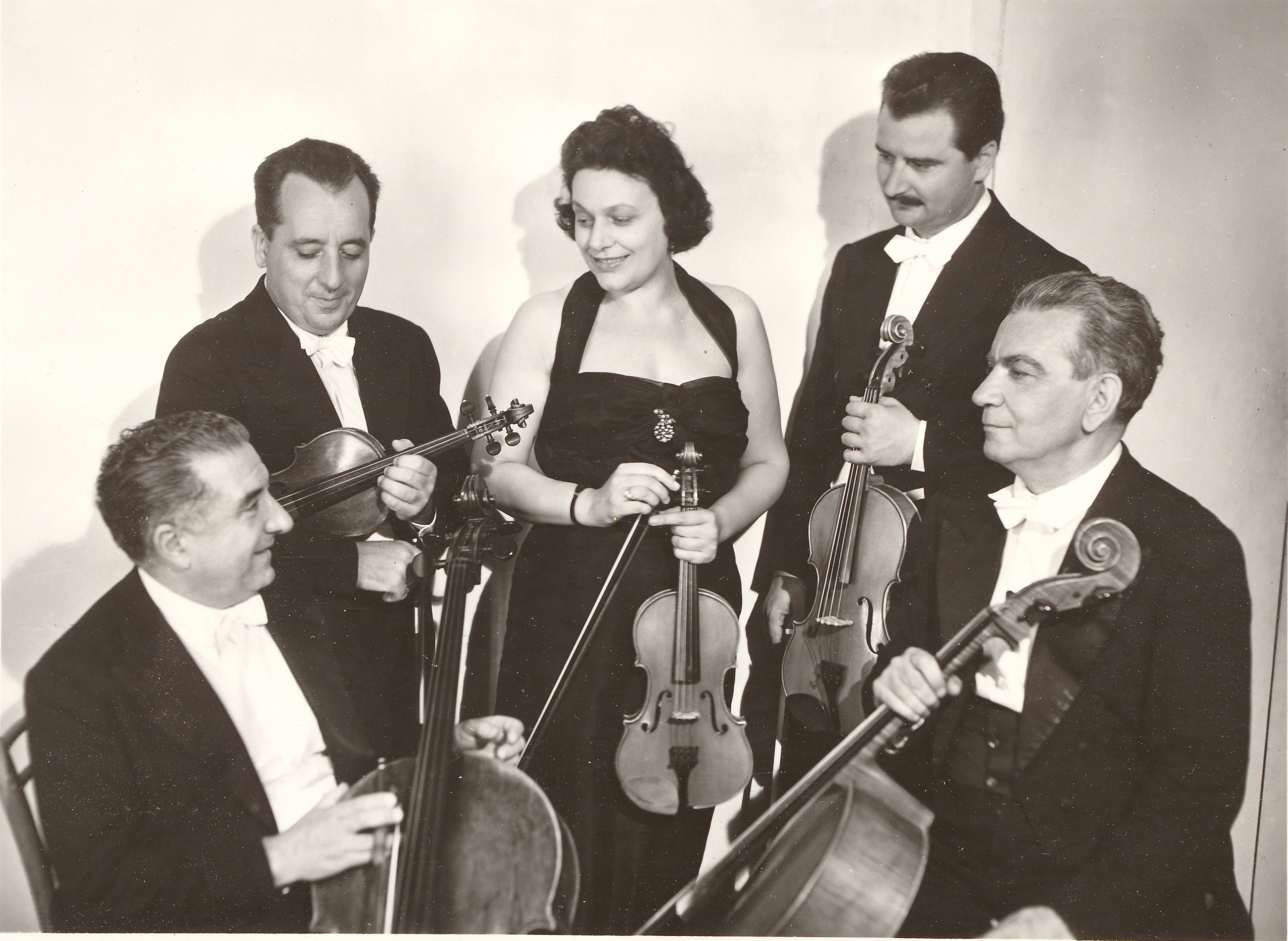
- The Boccherini Quintet in the 1950s (from left to right: Nerio Brunelli, Guido Mozzato, Pina Carmirelli, Luigi Sagrati and Arturo Bonucci)

Background information
- Also known as: Quintetto Boccherini
- Genres: String quintet

The Boccherini Quintet (Quintetto Boccherini) was a string quintet founded in Rome in 1949 when two of its original members, Arturo Bonucci (cello) and Pina Carmirelli (violin), discovered and bought, in Paris, a complete collection of the first edition of Luigi Boccherini's 141 string quintets, and set about to promote this long neglected music. Since then, they performed all over Italy and Europe and in many parts of the world, including thirteen tours of North America.

After the death of the two founders, the violist Luigi Sagrati became the main organizer of the quintet's recording and performing activities until the mid-nineties, when he had to quit public performances because of old age.

The group toured Southern Africa in 1959 as Quintetto Boccherini, and were again in demand in 1960 as Quartetto Carmirelli di Roma.

The quintet has recorded many LPs in Italy and abroad, mainly of music by Luigi Boccherini but also string quintets by Antonio Bazzini, Franz Schubert and Luigi Cherubini. Their records have been published by various recording houses like La voce del padrone, Fonit Cetra - Italia, Ensayo, EMI - Angel Records.

A two-record album, played by Cervera, Buccarella, Sagrati, Scano and Stella, and entirely dedicated to Boccherini's quintets, and issued by the Spanish recording house Ensayo in 1976, won the Grand Prix du Disque of L'Académie Charles Cros. Some of the quintet's recordings have been re-issued on CD in the UK by Testament Records at the beginning of the 21st century.

== Members ==
Many musicians played in the Quintet over the years. In addition to the two aforementioned founders, the original Quintetto included Dino Asciolla (who alternated with Carmirelli as first violin), Renzo Sabatini (viola) and Nerio Brunelli (cello). Among the most notable of the several other players one recalls Guido Mozzato, Montserrat Cervera, Arrigo Pelliccia, Marco Fiorini and Claudio Buccarella (violins); Marco Scano (first cello); Piero Stella (second cello); and Luigi Sagrati (viola).

- violins
  - Pina Carmirelli (Varzi, 23 January 1914 – Capena, 26 February 1993)
  - Dino Asciolla (Rome, 6 June 1920 – Siena, 9 September 1994)
  - Alberto Poltronieri (Milan, 9 November 1892 – Milan, 13 January 1983)
  - Arrigo Pelliccia (Viareggio, 20 February 1912 – Rome, 19 July 1987)
  - Guido Mozzato
- violas
  - Renzo Sabatini
  - Luigi Sagrati (Rome, 10 November 1921 – Rome, 20 March 2008)
- cellos
  - Arturo Bonucci (Sr.) (Rome, 19 April 1894 – Rome, 11 January 1964)
  - Nerio Brunelli

== Discography ==
Works by Antonio Bazzini:

- Quintet in A major, Italia Fonit Cetra ITL 70046, 1978 (Cervera, Buccarella, Sagrati, Scano, Stella).

Works by Luigi Boccherini:

- Largo from Quintet in A, op.10, n.1, La voce del padrone, ALP 1385, 1956, and Angel Records 45007, (Pelliccia, Mozzato, Sagrati, Bonucci, Brunelli); republished by Testament Records in 2002.
- From the Quintet in A major, op.10, n.5, Allegretto, La voce del padrone, QALP 10140, and Angel Records 45006, 1956, (Pelliccia, Mozzato, Sagrati, Bonucci, Brunelli).
- Quintet in F, op.11, n.3, La voce del padrone, 1957, (Pelliccia, Mozzato, Sagrati, Bonucci, Brunelli); republished as CD by Testament Records in 2002.
- Quintet in E, op.11, n.5, La voce del padrone, ALP 1385, and La voce del padrone QALP 10134, 1956, (Pelliccia, Mozzato, Sagrati, Bonucci, Brunelli); republished as CD by Testament Records, SBT 1243 in 2002.
- Quintet in D, op.11, n.4 (some sources indicate this as op. 11, n.6) "L'Uccelliera", La voce del padrone, ALP 1385, and Angel Records 45008, 1956 (Pelliccia, Mozzato, Sagrati, Bonucci, Brunelli); republished as CD by Testament Records, SBT 1243, in 2002.
- Largo op.12, n.1, La voce del padrone, QALP 10134, 1956, (Pelliccia, Mozzato, Sagrati, Bonucci, Brunelli).
- Andante sostenuto, from Quintet in E major, op.13, n.2, Angel Records 45011, (Pelliccia, Mozzato, Sagrati, Bonucci, Brunelli).
- Quintetto in F major, op.13, n.3, La voce del padrone, ALP 1332, Angel Records 45009 and La voce del padrone, QALP 10130, 1956, (Pelliccia, Mozzato, Sagrati, Bonucci, Brunelli).
- Quintet in E major op.13, n.5, including the famous "minuetto"; La voce del padrone, QALP 10134, and Angel Records 45007, 1956 (Pelliccia, Mozzato, Sagrati, Bonucci, Brunelli); recorded again by Ensayo, ENY 706, 1975 (Cervera, Buccarella, Sagrati, Scano and Stella).
- Quintet in C minor, op.18, n.1 "Di Dina", La voce del padrone, ALP 1332, Angel Records 45009 and by La voce del padrone, QALP 10130, 1957, (Pelliccia, Mozzato, Sagrati, Bonucci, Brunelli); republished in CD by Testament Records SBT 1244, 2002.
- Quintet in D minor, op.18, n.5, Angel Records 45011, 1954, (Pelliccia, Mozzato, Sagrati, Bonucci, Brunelli); republished in CD by Testament Records in 2002.
- Quintet in F major op. 20, n.3, Ensayo, (Cervera, Buccarella, Sagrati, Scano and Stella), Ensayo, ENY 706, 1975..
- Quintet in D minor, op.25, n.1, La voce del padrone, ALP 1406, 1956, and Angel Records, 45010. (Pelliccia, Mozzato, Sagrati, Bonucci, Brunelli), republished as CD by Testament Records in 2002.
- Quintet in C, op.25, n.3, La voce del padrone, ALP 1406, and Angel Records 45010, 1956 (Pelliccia, Mozzato, Sagrati, Bonucci, Brunelli); republished as CD by Testament Records in 2002.
- Quintet in A major op. 28, Angel Records 45006, (Pelliccia, Mozzato, Sagrati, Bonucci, Brunelli).
- Quintet in A, op.28, n.2 "Della Disgrazia", La voce del padrone, 1956, and Angel Records, 45011, (Pelliccia, Mozzato, Sagrati, Bonucci, Brunelli); republished by Testament Records in 2002.
- Quintet in C minor op. 29, n.1, Angel Records 45008, (Pelliccia, Mozzato, Sabatini, Bonucci, Brunelli); and PDU, 1976. (Cervera, Buccarella, Sagrati, Scano and Stella).
- Quintet in C minor, op.29, n.2, La voce del padrone, 1954 (Pelliccia, Mozzato, Sabatini, Bonucci, Brunelli); republished by Testament Records in 2002.
- Quintet in A, op.29, n.4, La voce del padrone, 1956, (Pelliccia, Mozzato, Sagrati, Bonucci, Brunelli); republished by Testament Records in 2002.
- From the Quintet op.29, n.6: Ballo Tedesco La voce del padrone, QALP 10140, and Angel Records, 45006, 1956, and Largo Cantabile, op.29, n.6, Angel Records 45010, (Pelliccia, Mozzato, Sagrati, Bonucci, Brunelli).
- Quintettino op.30, n.6 "Musica notturna delle strade di Madrid" (translated as the "Night Music of the Streets of Madrid"), Ensayo ENY 707, 1975, (Cervera, Buccarella, Sagrati, Scano and Stella).
- Quintet in E flat, op.31, n.1, La voce del padrone, 1956 (Pelliccia, Mozzato, Sagrati, Bonucci, Brunelli); republished by Testament Records in 2002.
- Quintet in D major op.37, n.2, Ensayo ENY 707, 1975, (Cervera, Buccarella, Sagrati, Scano and Stella).
- Quintet in D, op.40, n.2 "Del Fandango", La voce del padrone, 1954 and Angel Records, 45011, (Pelliccia, Mozzato, Sagrati, Bonucci, Brunelli); republished by Testament Records in 2002. Also recorded in 1976 with Ensayo, (Cervera, Buccarella, Sagrati, Scano and Stella), ENY 707, 1975.
- Quintet in A major, op.40, n.4, La voce del padrone, ALP 1385, Angel Records 45007, 1956, also La voce del padrone, QALP 10134, (Pelliccia, Mozzato, Sagrati, Bonucci, Brunelli); republished by Testament Records in 2002.
- Grave in D minor op.41, Angel Records 45007 and La voce del padrone, QALP 10134, 1956, (Pelliccia, Mozzato, Sagrati, Bonucci, Brunelli).
- Quintet in F, op.41, n.2, La voce del padrone ALP1361, Angel Records 45006 and in Italy QALP 10140, 1956, (Pelliccia, Mozzato, Sagrati, Bonucci, Brunelli); republished by Testament Records SBT 1245, in 2002. Recorded again as LP by PDU, 1976, (Cervera, Buccarella, Sagrati, Scano and Stella).
- Quintet in C, op.42, n.2, La voce del padrone, 1956 (Pelliccia, Mozzato, Sagrati, Bonucci, Brunelli); republished by Testament Records in 2002.
- Quintet in D major, op.50, n.2, "In the style of the Spanish Seguidilla", Angel Records, 45011, and "Del Fandango", Ensayo ENY 707, 1975, (Cervera, Buccarella, Sagrati, Scano and Stella).
- Quintet in G major, op.60, n.5, La voce del padrone, 1954, (Pelliccia, Mozzato, Sabatini, Bonucci, Brunelli), La voce del padrone, 1956; and Angel Records 45008 republished as CD by Testament Records in 2002.

Works by Luigi Cherubini:

- String Quintet (revised by Pietro Spada) and Souvenir pour son cher Baillot (string quartet), LP issued by Italia Fonit Cetra, ITL 70008, 1977.

Works by Franz Schubert:

- String Quintet in C major, op. 163, D.956, La voce del padrone, ALP 1373 (La Voce del Padrone QALP 10179), 2/1957. (Arrigo Pelliccia, Guido Mozzato, Luigi Sagrati, Nerio Brunelli and Arturo Bonucci 2nd cello).
