= Michelucci =

Michelucci is an Italian surname, derived from the given name Michele. Notable people with the surname include:

- Giovanni Michelucci (1891–1990), Italian architect, urban planner, and designer
- Roberto Michelucci (1922–2010), Italian classical violinist
