= Centaur Records =

American record label

- Founded: 1976
- Founder: Victor Sachse
- Distributor: Naxos Records
- Genre: Classical
- Country of origin: U.S.
- Location: Baton Rouge, Louisiana
- Official website: www.centaurrecords.com

Centaur Records is one of the oldest and largest independent classical labels in America. The company is located in Baton Rouge, Louisiana and was founded by Victor Sachse in 1976. Centaur's catalog includes classical, historical, pops, contemporary, crossover, electro-acoustic, and world music.

== Artists ==
Centaur Record artists include composer Charles Roland Berry, pianists Sophia Agranovich, Antonio Pompa-Baldi, Beatrice Berrut and Burkard Schliessmann, composer Jack Cooper, composers Wendy Mae Chambers and Marco Katz, oboist Alessandro Baccini, pianist and composer Richard Aaker Trythall, cellists Amit Peled, Simca Heled, and Antony Cooke, organist, composer, and conductor composer Haig Mardirosian, Jeffry Hamilton Steele, conductor and composer Yoav Talmi, vocalist Nanette McGuinness, santur player and composer Pouya Saraei and violinists Ragin Wenk-Wolff and Miranda Cuckson.

== Distribution ==
Centaur has distributors in the U.S., Canada, Great Britain, Germany, France, Italy, Belgium, the Netherlands, Norway, Denmark, the Czech Republic, Japan, China, Taiwan, and South Korea. Centaur recordings are on all major download and streaming sites, as well as on the classical specialty download and stream sites.

== See also ==
- List of record labels
- Historical classical music recordings
