= Luigi Sagrati =

Italian violist (1921 - 2008)

Luigi Sagrati (Rome, 10 November 1921 – Rome 20 March 2008) was an Italian violist.

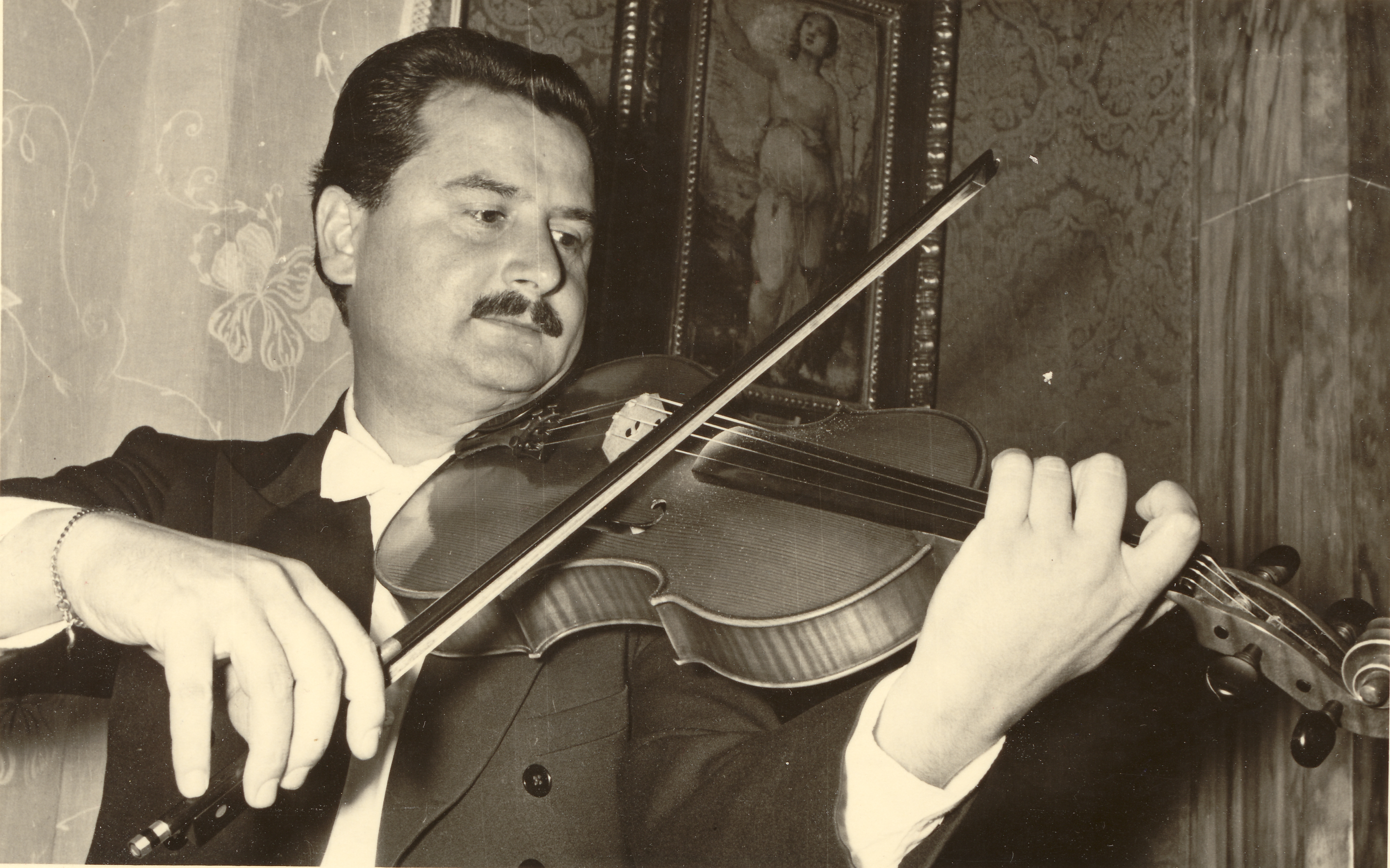
Luigi Sagrati

He began studying the violin very young, and graduated cum laude from the Accademia Nazionale di Santa Cecilia. In the immediate postwar period he began an intensive concert activity in Italy and abroad. He began to study the viola in the early 1950s and switched to this instrument on a full-time basis when was invited by Pina Carmirelli and Arturo Bonucci to replace Renzo Sabatini in the Quintetto Boccherini. Bonucci and Carmirelli had just bought in Paris a complete collection of the 141 string quintets by Luigi Boccherini, and set about to promote this long forgotten music. After the deaths of Bonucci and Carmirelli, Luigi Sagrati became the main force behind the success of the Quintetto Boccherini, which ceased its activities in the 1990s, when he had to stop performing professionally because of his age.

Sagrati also founded the Brahms Quartet for strings and piano with Piero Masi (pianoforte), Marco Scano (Cello) and Montserrat Cervera (violin).

With both groups he completed many tournées in Europe and around the world, including thirteen in North America. Both groups also recorded many records for various recording houses, including La voce del padrone, Italia, Ensayo.

From 1977 to his death he was president of the Unione Musicisti di Roma, with whose chamber orchestra he worked to spread musical culture in the Latium region. The orchestra also collaborated with Ennio Morricone for the sound track of some of this famous films.

He was married to the Sicilian soprano Lidia Cremona (1919-1998), who was a well known performer in the 1940s and 1950s. He owned two violas: a "Tertis model" Capicchioni of 1956 and one made by Roberto Bianchi in the 1980s. For most of his career he played with a bow made by Dominique Peccatte in the 1870s.
