= Yōsuke Kawasaki =

American orchestral violinist, chamber musician and soloist

Yōsuke Kawasaki (born May 1977) is a noted orchestral violinist, chamber musician and soloist.

== Biography ==
Kawasaki was born in New York City. He is a Japanese American. He began his violin studies at the age of six with his father, Masao Kawasaki, and continued with Setsu Goto. At the age of ten he was accepted into the Juilliard School Pre-College Division where he won the school-wide concerto competition. His high school years were spent at the Ethical Culture Fieldston School. He then continued his education and graduated from The Juilliard School in 1998 under the tutorship of Dorothy DeLay, Hyo Kang, Felix Galimir, and Joel Smirnoff.

Kawasaki has served as the concertmaster of a number of orchestras, including the Montgomery Symphony Orchestra (1999–2001) and the Century Orchestra in Osaka, Japan. He is also the co-concertmaster of the Mito Chamber Orchestra and the Saito Kinen Orchestra. He took over as concertmaster of the National Arts Centre Orchestra in Ottawa for the 2007–2008 season.

An active chamber musician, Kawasaki is a founding member of the D'Amici String Quartet along with world-renowned musicians Federico Agostini, James Creitz and Sadao Harada giving critically acclaimed performances and master classes in Europe and Japan. Kawasaki maintains a duo as well with Russian-born pianist Vadim Serebryany. The duo is best known for their interpretation of Beethoven's Complete Piano and Violin Sonatas and has performed this program in the United States and Canada.

Kawasaki was named Concertmaster of the National Arts Centre Orchestra, on July 7, 2007. Kawasaki is only the second Concertmaster in the orchestra's history. He succeeds in founding Concertmaster Walter Prystawski, who led the orchestra for 37 years.

== Awards and recognition ==
- 2004 S & R Washington Award
