= Federico Agostini =

Italian classical violinist

Federico Agostini (born 1959) is an Italian violinist renowned as a soloist, chamber musician and teacher.

== Early life ==
Agostini was born in Trieste, Italy. After early training with his grandfather, he studied violin at his hometown's conservatory of music, in Trieste, then in Venice, and later at the Accademia Chigiana in Siena. Salvatore Accardo and Franco Gulli were among his teachers. Agostini made his debut as a soloist at the age of 16, playing Mozart under the baton of the late Carlo Zecchi. Ever since he has performed throughout the world as a recitalist, soloist with orchestra and as concertmaster of the Italian ensemble I Musici.

== Career ==
Agostini has appeared in various international music festivals in Europe, United States and Japan and has performed chamber music with many distinguished artists including Bruno Giuranna, Jaime Laredo, Joseph Silverstein, Janos Starker as well as with members of the American, Emerson, Fine Arts, Tokyo and Guarneri quartets. Together with violinist Yosuke Kawasaki (currently concertmaster of National Arts Centre Orchestra, Ottawa), James Creitz (former violist of the Academica Quartet) and Sadao Harada (former cellist and founder of the Tokyo String Quartet), Federico Agostini has recently founded the D'Amici String Quartet which began its activities in 2004.

Among Agostin's Philips recordings there are Bach and Vivaldi's violin concertos, including the Four Seasons, which was filmed on location in Venice and available also on DVD. Other recordings include the Fauré's 'Piano Quartets' produced by Claves and, more recently, an Hommage à Nathan Milstein, a selection of favorite virtuoso violin pieces, published by 'Live Notes' in Japan.

Agostini maintains a very busy schedule as a teacher. He has taught eight years in the Conservatories of Venice and Trieste, Italy, and ten years at the Staatliche Hochschule für Musik in Trossingen, Germany; has given numerous master classes at music universities in the United States, Canada and Mexico, as well as in Italy, Germany, Denmark, Sweden, Japan and Australia. Since Summer 2009 he is on the faculty at Centre d'Arts Orford, Québec.

He currently resides in the United States where from 2002 to 2012 he taught at Bloomington's Indiana University Jacobs School of Music. In 2012 he was appointed Professor of Violin at the Eastman School of Music in Rochester, New York.
