= Historical classical music recordings =

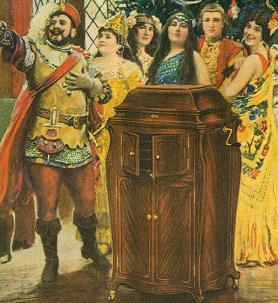
"The world's greatest singers, players, bands and orchestras enter your home with Victrola" Advertisement for a phonograph player (1915)

Historical classical music recordings are generally classical music recordings made prior to the stereo era of vinyl disc recording, which began around 1957.

As time passes, even later recordings, made in the early stereo era are also being released as "historical" recordings, especially if they were never released or were dropped from the record catalogs due to loss of popularity or "antiquated" sound. Typically such recordings are of artists and performances that were particularly notable at the time they were first released, or were unavailable because they were private recordings made at concerts or radio broadcasts. The latter can be of rather high quality if the recording derives from tapes made and archived by the broadcaster or the organization mounting the performance.

== Recordings issued by arts organizations ==
Important sources of historical recordings are the broadcast archives of orchestras and opera companies. For instance, the Met Opera of New York has issued a number of historical broadcast recordings which are only available upon making a donation. In the late 1980s, the Metropolitan Opera Guild issued a large number of two-disc compilations of historical recordings called Great Operas at the Met. Each album featured recorded performances of arias from a particular opera, generally beginning in the early 20th century and continuing up into the early stereo era.

The Boston Symphony Orchestra issued a 12-CD box entitled Boston Symphony Orchestra Symphony Hall Centennial Celebration: From the Broadcast Archives 1943-2000 in the 1980s. These recordings are now available for download from the orchestra's web site.

== Major label reissues ==
Many of the major record labels have also reissued important historical recordings. For example, Philips Records issued a 200-CD series of recordings entitled Great Pianists of the 20th Century in 1999.

== Record labels specializing in historic recordings ==
There are a number of record labels that have primarily issued historic classical recordings or have treated them as an important category.

Examples include:

- Arbiter Records.
- Centaur Records
- Fonit Cetra
- Golden Melodram
- Harmonia Mundi
- Hunt
- Laudis
- Legato Classics
- Marston Records
- Music & Arts
- Pearl
- Sakuraphon.
- Standing Room Only
- Symposium Cds.
- Testament Records
- Verona

== Recordings made and shared privately by clubs, internet groups, blogs, and other aficionado-run free forums ==
Recordings made from radio and internet broadcasts, in-house personal microphones and recording devices, and from performer's earpiece monitor transmissions are archived and disseminated in various ways. This kind of documentation of live performance is also known as a Recording Of Indeterminate Origin, or ROIO. Many blogs, clubs, internet groups and other forums exist whose members contribute and receive ROIOs, many of which have never been available commercially. Most of these forums traffic in non-commercially available broadcast/other classical music recordings for free. Historic recordings that begin as freely traded ROIOs often surface later as commercial products.

== Grammy Awards ==
The Grammy Awards have included a category for Best Historical Album since 1979, which does not distinguish between classical and non-classical albums. Below is a table of notable classical winners and nominees in this category:

Year	Award	Album title	Performers	Label
2022	Nomination	Glenn Gould—The Goldberg Variations—The Complete Unreleased 1981 Studio Sessions	Glenn Gould	Sony Classical
2021	Nomination	Marian Anderson—Beyond the Music—Her Complete RCA Victor Recordings	Marian Anderson	Sony Classical
2020	Nomination	The Great Comeback—Horowitz at Carnegie Hall	Vladimir Horowitz	Sony Classical
2019	Nomination	A Rhapsody in Blue—The Extraordinary Life of Oscar Levant	Oscar Levant	Sony Classical
2018	Win	Leonard Bernstein—The Composer	Leonard Bernstein	Sony Classical
2018	Nomination	Glenn Gould—The Goldberg Variations—The Complete Unreleased Recording Sessions, June 1955	Glenn Gould	Sony Classical
2017	Nomination	Vladimir Horowitz—The Unreleased Live Recordings 1966–1983	Vladimir Horowitz	Sony Classical
2014	Nomination	Wagner: Der Ring des Nibelungen (Deluxe Edition)	Sir Georg Solti, Vienna Philharmonic Orchestra	Decca
2001	Nomination	The Rubinstein Collection	Arthur Rubinstein	RCA Red Seal
2000	Nomination	The Mahler Broadcasts 1948–1982	New York Philharmonic	New York Philharmonic Special Editions
1999	Nomination	New York Philharmonic—The Historic Broadcasts 1923 to 1987	New York Philharmonic	New York Philharmonic Special Editions
1997	Nomination	Fritz Kreisler—The Complete RCA Recordings	Fritz Kreisler	RCA Victor Gold Seal
1996	Win	The Heifetz Collection	Jascha Heifetz, Various Artists	RCA Victor Gold Seal
1995	Nomination	Andres Segovia—A Centenary Celebration	Andres Segovia	MCA Classics
1992	Nomination	The Complete Caruso	Enrico Caruso	RCA Victor Gold Seal
1992	Nomination	Igor Stravinsky—The Recorded Legacy	Igor Stravinsky, Various Artists	Sony Classical
1991	Nomination	Beethoven: Symphonies 1–9 & Leonore Overture No. 3	Arturo Toscanini, NBC Symphony Orchestra	RCA Gold Seal
1991	Nomination	Verdi: Aida, Falstaff, Requiem, Te Deum, Va, Pensiero, Hymn of the Nations	Arturo Toscanini, NBC Symphony Orchestra	RCA Gold Seal
1987	Nomination	The Mapleson Cylinders	Various Metropolitan Opera Artists	Rodgers and Hammerstein Archives
1986	Win	RCA/Met—100 Singers—100 Years	Various Artists	RCA Red Seal
1984	Win	The Greatest Recordings of Arturo Toscanini—Symphonies, Vol. I	Arturo Toscanini	Franklin Mint Record Society
1983	Nomination	Bartok at the Piano, 1920–1945	Béla Bartok	Hungaroton
1981	Win	Segovia—The EMI Recordings 1927–39	Andrés Segovia	Angel
1980	Nomination	A Tribute to E. Power Biggs	E. Power Biggs, Various Artists	Columbia Masterworks
1979	Nomination	La Divina	Maria Callas	Angel

Note: The Grammy Award for Best Historical Album also recognizes the work of compilation producers and mastering engineers. For full credits, see the Grammy Awards website.

== See also ==
- Association for Recorded Sound Collections
- Cylinder Preservation and Digitization Project
