= Marino Colina =

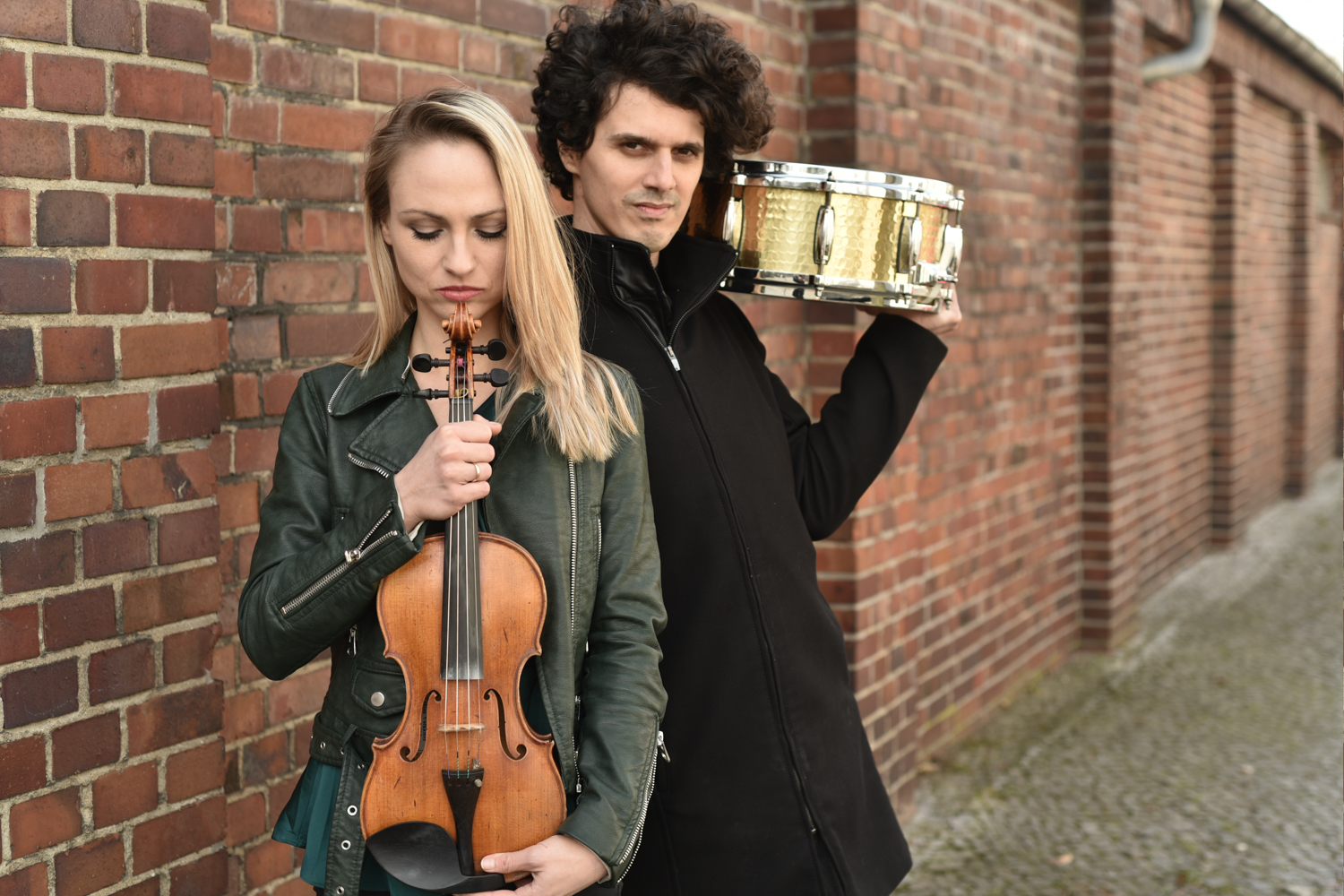
- Marino Colina, drummer of Olga Show and Olga Kholodnaya

Background information
- Born: 11 November 1981 (age 43); Buenos Aires, Argentina
- Genres: Classical, Violin&Drums
- Occupation: Drummer
- Instrument: Drums
- Website: www.olgashow.com

Marino Colina (born 11 November 1981) is an Argentine drummer, composer, conductor and producer born in Buenos Aires, Argentina.

== Biography ==
Marino Colina, was born in Buenos Aires, Argentina, of Venezuelan-Italian parentage. His mother Maria Francesca Delacqua immigrated from Messina, Italy to Argentina with her parents in 1951. His father, Marino Jose de Jesús Colina Pardo, an aeronautics engineer, from Venezuela, met her in London during the 1970s and together they initiated a family in Buenos Aires. Being raised in such a multicultural family, Marino got in touch with very diverse musical styles and got very interested in arts in general.

Since 2012, he is the drummer of Olga Show. In October 2012 the band Olga Show won the award for Best Street Performer in Berlin (Sat.1-Frühstücksfernsehen.

In 2017 Colina, with numerous performances in Switzerland and Germany, premiered with Olga Show and their own strings ensemble, J.S. Bach's Double Concerto for two Violins and Drums in the Berliner Philharmonie. Their debut received standing ovations and was acclaimed by the Berliner press. Colina is the first drummer to arrange and perform this whole concerto for drum kit.

Also 4 November 2017 Olga Show premiered in Rosenheim their arrangement for Felix Mendelssohn's Violin Concerto also for Violin and Drums, that was praised by the Bavarian critic.

1995-2009 Marino Colina studied since the age of 14 drums at the Juan - Jose - Castro Conservatory in Buenos Aires with Prof. Tristan Taboada, main percussionist at the Teatro Colón, Buenos Aires . Marino Colina played at the youth orchestra Libertador San Martin . He started recording drums at the age of 15 with his band EBF in Buenos Aires.

As a teenager he was inspired mostly by Ian Paice, Gene Kruppa, Vinnie Colaiuta, Daniel "Pipi" Piazzolla and Sebastian Peyceré.

Since 2012, he is the drummer of Olga Show. In October 2012 the band Olga Show won the award for Best Street Performer in Berlin (Sat1 Frühstücksfernsehen).

In 2014 Marino Colina was organizing demonstrations to protect the rights of street performers in Berlin.

Marino Colina has performed along with Olga Kholodnaya in front of the Bataclan, four days after the 13 November 2015 attacks in Paris, as a call for world peace and a tribute for all the victims of war around the world.

== Discography ==
Release	Composer/Title of work	Performer	Label/Catalog no.	Format
2013	Olga Show: Night in Istanbul	Olga Kholodnaya (violin); Raúl Marcos (bass)	Groove Strasse 859710315030	CD
2014	Olga Show: Save the street musicians	Olga Kholodnaya (violin, synthetizer); Raúl Marcos (bass)	Groove Strasse 859714591270	CD

== Instrument ==
Currently, he plays a Masshoff orchestral drum kit specially developed for playing together with string instruments without the need of amplification. For 5 years prior to that, he had been using Gretsch drums.
