= Testament Records (UK) =

Classical music record label

The Testament Records label, based in Great Britain, specialises in historical classical music recordings, including previously unreleased broadcast performances by Arturo Toscanini and the NBC Symphony Orchestra and the pianist Solomon. It has also issued DVDs of kinescopes of Toscanini's 10 televised concerts on NBC from 1948 to 1952, adding sound taken from magnetic tape recordings of the broadcasts.

In 2004, Testament released the complete Verdi Requiem conducted by Toscanini from a BBC recording of a live concert at Queen's Hall, London on 27 May 1938, with soprano Zinka Milanov, mezzo-soprano Kerstin Thorborg, tenor Helge Rosvaenge, bass Nicola Moscona, and the BBC Symphony Orchestra and Chorus. The Gramophone Classical Musical Guide described the Testament issue as "skillfully remastered" and a superior performance to Toscanini's better known recording on RCA from 1951.

In 2008, the company released the complete 1955 Bayreuth Wagner Ring Cycle conducted by Joseph Keilberth. The cast included Hans Hotter as Wotan, Gustav Neidlinger as Alberich, Ramón Vinay as Siegmund, Astrid Varnay as Brünnhilde, and Wolfgang Windgassen as Siegfried. Andrew Quint, writing in Fanfare magazine, described the release as "the Wagner recording phenomenon of recent years" and Testament's reissue of them as "heroic", since the recordings had previously "been surrounded by a bureaucratic ring of fire."

== See also ==
- List of record labels
