= Olga Kholodnaya =

Russian violinist, composer, arranger and producer

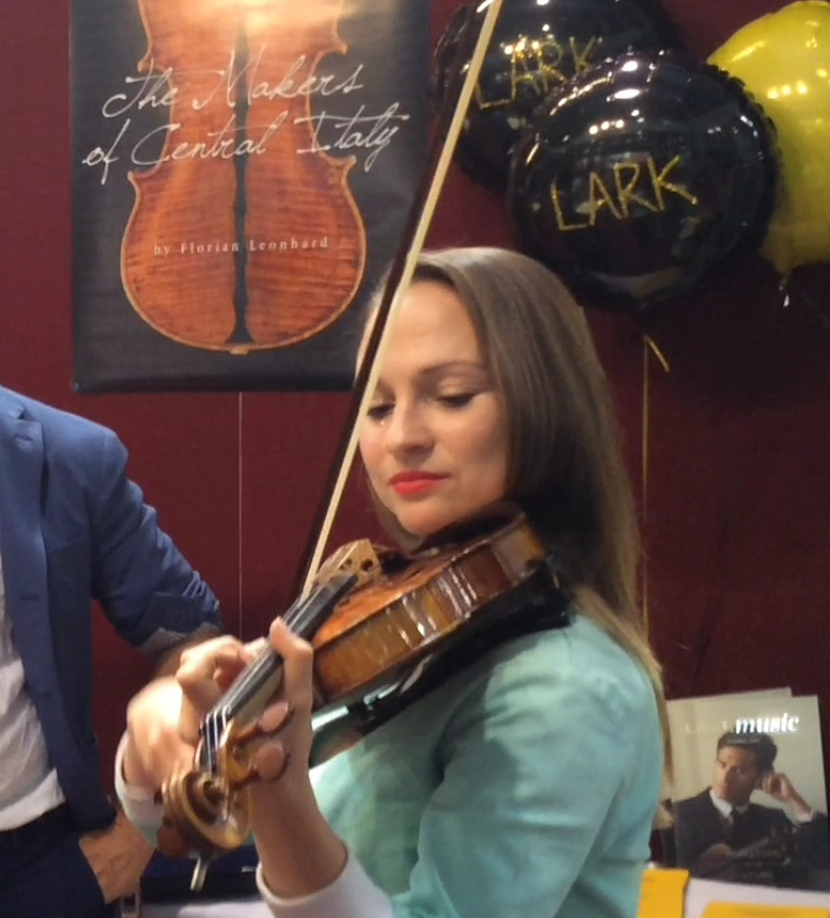
Olga Kholodnaya playing the Willemotte Stradivarius (1734) in Cremona, September 2015.

Olga Kholodnaya (Russian: Ольга Холодная) is a Russian violinist, composer, arranger and producer, born in Cheboksary, in the Soviet Union and based in Berlin, Germany.

== Biography ==
Born in Cheboksary, the capital of Chuvashia ex-Soviet Union, Olga Kholodnaya began studying the violin at the age of five.

Between 2000 and 2007, Kholodnaya studied classical music at the Richard-Strauss-Konservatorium München and Hochschule für Musik München. She studied with Zakhar Bron, Markus Wolf and Didier Lockwood. Olga Kholodnaya played with the Bayerische Philharmonie and Junge Münchner Philharmonie. She recorded Funk, Electro, House, and Hiphop since the age of 15. She started playing in the street Olga Show worldwide. In 2006 Olga Kholodnaya performed for the World Cup Opening in Munich Allianz Arena .

Between 2007 and 2010, Olga Kholodnaya survived a heavy injury. She learned to walk again. She never gave up playing the violin she went on playing the violin for her listeners as soon as she could. Music gave her the strength. In 2010, Kholodnaya recovered from the injury consequences to continue her path.

Since 2012, Olga Kholodnaya plays with Marino Colina, the drummer of Olga Show are pioneers of the music style "violin and drums".

After many years of solo performance. in 2011 Olga Kholodnaya started using the loop station Boss RC 30 for her performance and started experimenting with effects Boss and beats. this is how she composed Night in Istanbul and arranged famous classical tunes like Canon in D from J. Pachelbel, Libertango from A. Piazzolla. She covered Eminem`s 8 Mile, Christina Aguilera Genie in a Bottle, Nirvana - Smells like teen Spirit. She recorded a self made CD and sold over 3000 copies traveling to Turkey, Georgia, Azerbaijan, Munich and Berlin.

In Berlin, Kholodnaya was playing in the Metro Stations Friedrichstraße and Kottbusser Tor. She was celebrated by the audience, but banned by the Metro authorities, because of the prohibition of use of amplifiers in the Berliner Metro. This is how she started to play outside of the metro - in the streets of Berlin. Her favourite spots became Friedrichstraße next to Dussmann, Kurfürstendamm, next to Karstadt and Alexanderplatz under the Bridge.

As she did not like to play with electronic beats from her loop station, Olga was looking for a drummer to play her music with. This is how she met Marino Colina the current drummer of Olga Show and Raul Marcos the former Bassist.

The Band consisted of 3 people and had a huge success playing under the bridge in Alexanderplatz. Selling over 300 CDs per week and having large crowds listening to them.

But very soon the Band faced persecution by the authorities again, despite getting all the available permissions, there was no legal way that could be found to maintain playing in the Berlin city center.

Since then, Olga Kholodnaya and Marino Colina are organising demonstrations, fighting for the rights of freedom of performing and permissions for performers based on the Milan and London permission models. They criticise, that if the authorities forbid the use of amplifiers and drums - certain music styles can not be played in the streets and this vulnerates the freedom of expression of art.

Four days after the 13 November 2015 attacks in Paris, Kholodnaya performed in front of the Bataclan as a call for world peace.

== Double Concerto for Violin and Drums ==
Olga Kholodnaya and Marino Colina, also known as Olga Show, performed the world premiere of J.S. Bach´s Double Concerto for Violin and Drums in the Berliner Philharmonie on 9 June 2017. It was a big success that was celebrated by the press and audience.

== Mendelssohn Violin Concerto in e minor, Op.64 ==
In commemoration of the 170th year since the death of Felix Mendelssohn, Olga Show performed the world premiere of Felix Mendelssohn's Concerto Op.64 for Violin and Drums, in the Stadthalle in Rosenheim on 4 November 2017 acclaimed by the critic.

== Instrument ==
Currently, she plays a J.B. Vuillaume Violin from 1853 "The blade" (ex-Kägi) and a Jacob Veit Müller. Until 2017 she owned and played a Tobias Volkamer that she used for most of her recordings and her debut in the Berliner Philharmonie.

== Discography ==
Release	Composer/Title of work	Performer	Label/Catalog no.	Format
2013	Olga Show: Night in Istanbul	Marino Colina (drums); Raúl Marcos (bass)	Groove Strasse 859710315030	CD
2014	Olga Show: Save the street musicians	Marino Colina (drums, synthetizer); Raúl Marcos (bass)	Groove Strasse 859714591270	CD
