= La Serenissima (musical ensemble) =

La Serenissima is a British early music/period instrument ensemble founded in 1994 by violinist Adrian Chandler, who has served as the group's director since its creation. Taking its name from La Serenissima Repubblica di Venezia (Italian for The Most Serene Republic of Venice), the ensemble specializes in the music of Venetian Baroque composer Antonio Vivaldi (1678–1741) and his contemporaries.

Uniquely, the group's entire repertoire is edited from manuscript or contemporary sources, and it has been praised for its "glorious and all-too-rare ability to make one’s pulse race afresh with every new project" (Gramophone).

Since its first release on the AVIE label in 2003, La Serenissima's recordings have been lauded by numerous publications and have attracted multiple award nominations; Vivaldi: The French Connection won the 2010 Gramophone Award for Baroque Instrumental. Their interpretation of The Four Seasons was released in 2015, reaching Number 8 in the UK Specialist Classical Chart and featured as Editor's Choice by Gramophone Magazine and Concerto Choice by BBC Music Magazine. Their 2017 release The Italian Job has been praised on BBC Radio 3's Record Review and on Classic FM as "Drive Discovery", reached the Top Ten in the UK Specialist Classical Albums Chart, and won the 2017 Gramophone Award for Baroque Instrumental in the ceremony's 40th Anniversary year. The ensemble's 2018 release Vivaldi x2 is a disc of double concertos (for pairs of horns and oboes; oboe and bassoon; and violin and cello). It entered the UK Classical Music Charts at No. 1 in the week of its release, and featured as Classic FM's Album of the Week.

La Serenissima has performed internationally to acclaim; recent highlights include concerts at Bridgewater Hall, Sage Gateshead and Wigmore Hall, festivals in Petworth, Sablé, Swansea and Valletta, and performances of Brescianello's opera Tisbe at the 2018 Buxton International Festival. During 2017 the ensemble curated its first residency The Grand Tour at St John's Smith Square, performing little-known works by Brescianello, Caldara and Dall’Abaco amongst others of the Italian Baroque; the group gave three performances with choir and soloists at the 2017 Vivaldi in Venice Festival for Martin Randall Travel.
