= Bruno Giuranna =

Italian violist (born 1933)

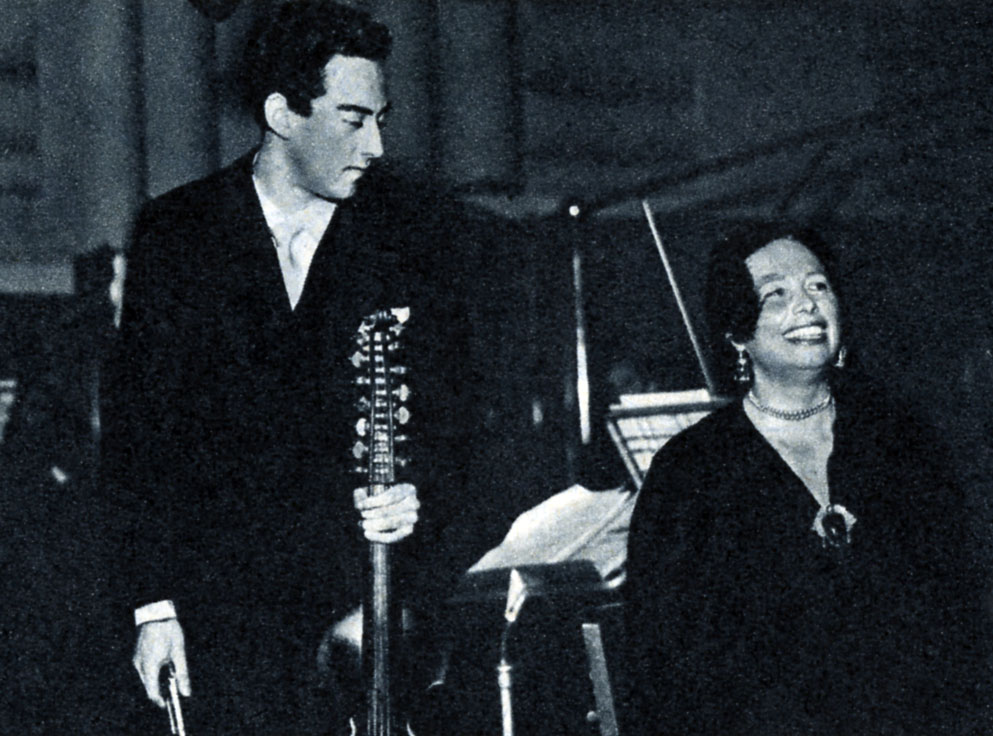
Giuranna with pianist Ornella Puliti Santoliquido, 1955

Bruno Giuranna (born 6 April 1933 in Milan) is an Italian violist.

Born in Milan, to composer Barbara Giuranna, Bruno Giuranna completed his musical studies at the Santa Cecilia Conservatory in Rome. He founded the Italian chamber orchestra "I Musici" with a group of young musician friends in 1951.

Bruno Giuranna was founding violist of the original Quartetto di Roma, and the Italian String Trio with whom he recorded the complete string trios of Ludwig Van Beethoven for Deutsche Grammophon in the 1960s. In 1989 he recorded the Beethoven String Trios again for Deutsche Grammophon at the invitation of Anne-Sophie Mutter and Mstislav Rostropovich.

This recording was nominated for a Grammy award in 1990.

Bruno Giuranna performed the premiere of Musica da Concerto for viola and string orchestra, by Giorgio Federico Ghedini, under the baton of Herbert von Karajan. He has played as a soloist with orchestras such as the Berlin Philharmonic, the Royal Concertgebouw Orchestra and La Scala in Milan under conductors including Claudio Abbado, Carlo Maria Giulini, Sir John Barbirolli, Riccardo Muti and Sergiu Celibidache.

Giuranna held the post of Professor of viola at the Hochschule der Kunste in Berlin from 1983 until 1998 and has held Viola Professor positions at the Hochschule für Musik Detmold, the Santa Cecilia Conservatory in Rome, the Royal College and Royal Academy in London, and the Conservatorio della Svizzera italiana in Lugano. Frequently invited to the Marlboro Festival in the USA, he currently teaches at the Fondazione Stauffer in Cremona and at the Accademia Chigiana in Siena. From 1983 to 1992 he was the artistic director of the Orchestra da Camera di Padova e il Veneto.

In 1987, he was decorated by the Italian president with the title of Cavaliere di Gran Croce al Merito.

Giuranna was also responsible for a transcription of Bach's Goldberg Variations. The world premiere recording of this work was made by the Trio Broz in 2008. Bruno Giuranna was also a member of the Trio Italiano d'Archi and of the Italian chamber orchestra I Musici di Roma.

In 2020, Giuranna served as president of the central board for ESTA (European String Teachers Association).
