= Roberto Michelucci =

Italian classical violinist (1922–2010)

- Born: 29 October 1922; Livorno, Italy
- Died: 1 November 2010 (aged 88) Reggello, Italy
- Genres: Classical
- Occupation: violinist
- Instrument: Violin
- Years active: 1950–2010
- Label: Philips

Roberto Michelucci (29 October 1922 – 1 November 2010) was an Italian classical violinist.

He obtained his diploma in violin in the courses with Gioacchino Maglioni (1891–1966) at the Conservatorio Luigi Cherubini in Florence. In 1950 he obtained the first absolute place at the Rassegna Concertisti di Roma.

His discographic recordings have been admired by many critics, and among the many prizes he won at his label (Philips) some of the most important were:

He won three times, between 1967 and 1969, the Grand Prix du Disque di Parigi.
Premio della critica Francese (Paris).

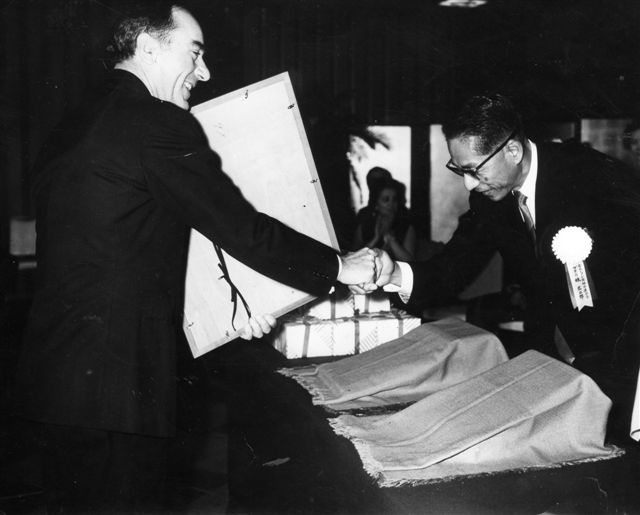
Michelucci receives the gold record in Tokyo in 1972.

1972: Gold record in Tokyo, for selling more than one million copies of Vivaldi's Four Seasons. He was the first case of a gold record obtained by a classical musician.

In addition to being a member, for several years, of I Musici di Roma, he joined, among other musicians: pianists Bruno Canino, Maureen Jones and Tullio Macoggi and conductors Hermann Scherchen, Laszlo Somogji, Bernhard Paumgartner, Lovro von Matacic, Rudolf Kempe, Artur Rodzinsky, Gianandrea Gavazzeni, and Ernest Ansermet.

He was the first Italian violinist invited to the Salzburg Festival, where he and the Camerata Academica del Mozarteum performed Mozart's concertos K. 219 and K. 211 in August 1967 and 1968.

His vast repertory included baroque through contemporary composers, and many authors composed works especially for him, for example the Concerto lirico per violino e orchestra by Valentino Bucchi.

He presented, for the first time in Israel, Luigi Dallapiccola's Tartiniane per violino ed orchestra (with the Sinfonica di Haifa); in Geneva he played Ferruccio Busoni's violin concerto with the Orchestre de la Suisse Romande and played in Florence, with the Maggio Musicale Fiorentino, concerti op. 19 by Sergei Prokofiev, c minor by Robert Schumann, c minor by Felix Mendelssohn.

His last contribution was the recording (Foné) of Johann Sebastian Bach's Bach's sonatas and partitas for solo violin.

He was also a member of important international musical contests, as well as a teacher in specialization courses in different places in Europe, and professor in the Conservatorio Francesco Morlacchi in Perugia and, from 1960 to 1985, at the Conservatorio "Luigi Cherubini" in Florence, where he had a huge number of students.

== Bibliography ==
- Carlo Vettori: Arte Liutaria N°3 - December 1985
- Lexikon der Interpreten klassischer Musik im 20.Jahrhundert von Alain Pàris, dtv/Bärenreiter, October 1992
- Dizionario degli Interpreti Musicali (Musica Classica e Operistica), TEA I Dizionari UTET, February 1993
- Archi magazine N. 26 Anno V, novembre - December 2010
