= Pina Carmirelli =

Italian violinist (1914–1993)

- Born: 23 January 1914; Varzi, Italy
- Died: 27 February 1993 (aged 79); Capena, Italy
- Education: Milan Conservatory
- Occupations: Violinist; Academic teacher
- Organizations: Boccherini Quintet; Carmirelli Quartet; Quintetto Fauré; Accademia di Santa Cecilia

Pina Carmirelli (23 January 1914 in Varzi – 27 February 1993 in Capena) was an Italian violinist.

She started studying music and playing in public when she was very young. She was a pupil of Michelangelo Abbado, and graduated from the Milan Conservatory in violin (1930) and composition (1935). She won the Premio Stradivari in 1937 and the Premio Paganini in 1940. She married the cellist Arturo Bonucci.

She starred in a long concert career, both as soloist and in chamber groups, some of which she co-founded herself:

- The Boccherini Quintet (1950) with Arrigo Pelliccia and Guido Mozzato (violins), Luigi Sagrati and Renzo Sabatini (viola) and her husband Arturo Bonucci (first cello) and Nerio Brunelli (second cello).
- The Carmirelli Quartet (1954) with Arturo Bonucci (cello), Montserrat Cervera (second violin) and Luigi Sagrati (viola). (1954)
- The Quintetto Fauré (1979) with Maureen Jones (piano), Federico Agostini (second violin), Massimo Paris (viola) and Francesco Strano (cello).

She was a tenured professor of advanced studies at the Accademia di Santa Cecilia from 1941. She performed in recitals with Rudolf Serkin and Sergio Lorenzi and as a soloist under the direction of Carlo Maria Giulini. She was also first violin of I Musici. As a musicologist she edited the critical edition of the work of Boccherini.
