= I Musici =

Italian chamber orchestra

- Chamber orchestra
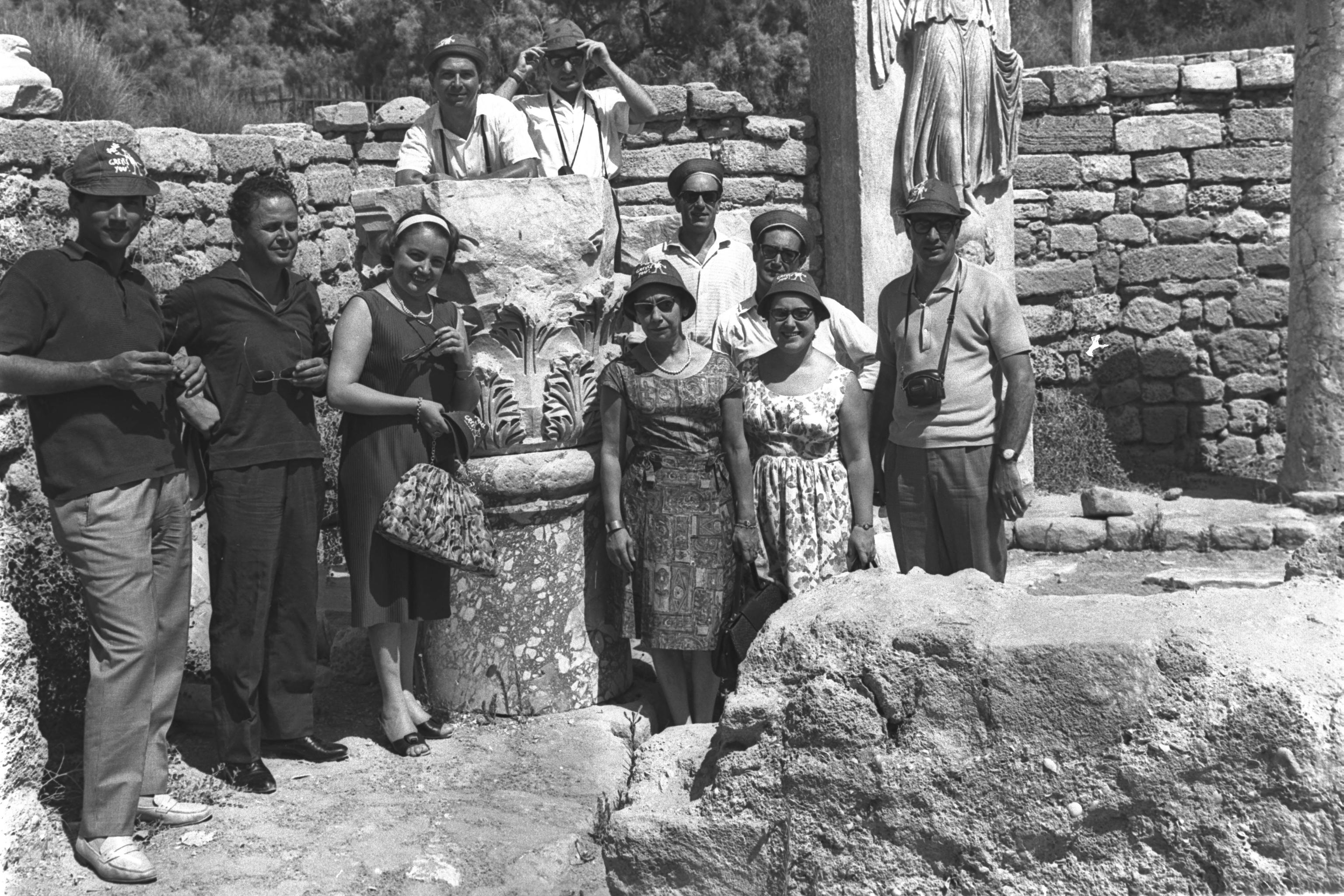
- Members of I Musici on a visit to Israel, 1962
- Founded: 1951
- Location: Rome
- Website: www.imusici.info

I Musici (pronounced [iˈmuːzitʃi]), also known as I Musici di Roma, is an Italian chamber orchestra from Rome formed in 1951. They are well known for their interpretations of Baroque and other works, particularly Antonio Vivaldi and Tomaso Albinoni.

Among their engagements, the original chamber orchestra completed acclaimed tours of Southern Africa 1956, and again in 1967, with a few replacement performers.

In the 1970s, I Musici recorded the first classical music video and, later, the group was the first to record a compact disc for the Philips label.

== Instrumentation ==
I Musici consists of a group of string instruments and one harpsichord. The strings include six violins, two violas, two cellos, and one double bass.

== Members ==
I Musici is a conductorless ensemble; the relationships among the twelve musicians enable great harmony in their music-making.

I Musici today

- Violins: Antonio Anselmi, Marco Serino, Ettore Pellegrino, Pasquale Pellegrino, Francesca Vicari, Gian Luca Apostoli
- Viola: Massimo Paris, Silvio Di Rocco
- Cello: Vito Paternoster, Pietro Bosna
- Double bass: Roberto Gambioli
- Harpsichord: Francesco Buccarella

Former members

- Violins: Salvatore Accardo, Federico Agostini, Felix Ayo, Arnaldo Apostoli, Claudio Buccarella, Pina Carmirelli, Italo Colandrea, Anna Maria Cotogni, Walter Gallozzi, Roberto Michelucci, Antonio Salvatore, Virgil Simons, Mariana Sirbu, Franco Tamponi, Luciano Vicari
- Viola: Dino Asciolla, Aldo Bennici, Paolo Centurioni, Carmen Franco, Alfonso Ghedin, Bruno Giuranna
- Cello: Enzo Altobelli, Mario Centurione, Francesco Strano
- Double bass: Lucio Buccarella
- Harpsichord: Maria Teresa Garatti
