= Little Einsteins season 1 =

Little Einsteins
- Season 1
- Showrunner: Jeff Borkin
- Starring: Jesse Schwartz; Natalia Wójcik; Aiden Pompey; Erica Huang
- No. of episodes: 29

Release
- Original network: Playhouse Disney
- Original release: October 9, 2005 – November 20, 2006

Season chronology
- Next → Season 2

The first season of Little Einsteins. It first aired on October 9, 2005 to November 20, 2006.

== Episodes ==
No. overall	No. in season	Title	Written by	Storyboard by	Original release date	Prod. code
1	1	"I Love to Conduct" (Note: While most episode guides list "Ring Around the Planet" as the first episode, "I Love to Conduct" is the first episode to be broadcast, and is technically counted as the first episode of the series.)	Eric Weiner	Barrett Benica and Kelly Peterson	October 9, 2005	104
The team watches the sunrise and things becoming happy. They see a bald eagle picking up sticks; soon after though, she mistakenly takes Leo's baton, and it is up to the team to retrieve it from the bald eagle. Art featured: The Peaceable Kingdom by Edward Hicks Music featured: Peer Gynt Suite No. 1 by Edvard Grieg
2	2	"Ring Around the Planet"	Jeff Borkin	Barrett Benica and Kelly Peterson	October 9, 2005	101
June is watching the stars and the planets on her telescope and loves the planet Saturn; she wants to dance with it. Suddenly, Saturn begins to play faster, then one of its rings comes loose, falls off, and lands in her garden, so it is up to the team to bring the ring back to Saturn. Art featured: The Tree of Life, Stoclet Frieze by Gustav Klimt Music featured: Symphony No. 9 in E minor, "From the New World" by Antonín Dvořák
3	3	"Hungarian Hiccups"	Jill Cozza	Barrett Benica and Kelly Peterson	October 10, 2005	103
Rocket participates in the Great Sky Race. However, he meets his nemesis, another competitor named Big Jet, and is nervous about racing him, although the team reassures him. To complicate matters, Rocket starts having the hiccups, so it is up to the team to scare them off before the sky race begins. Art featured: Tiger in a Tropical Storm by Henri Rousseau Music featured: Hungarian Dances by Johannes Brahms
4	4	"Whale Tale"	Douglas Wood	Barrett Benica and Kelly Peterson	October 11, 2005	106
The team is on the beach making sand castles while Rocket is playing with his new friend, Little Whale, until Little Whale's mother calls him home, to Rocket's sadness as he begins to miss his friend. The team decides to go to the ocean to find Little Whale so Rocket can be happy again. Art featured: The Shore at Bas-Butin, Honfleur by Georges Seurat Music featured: Horn Concertos by Wolfgang Amadeus Mozart
5	5	"Pirate's Treasure"	Claudia Silver	Barrett Benica and Kelly Peterson	October 12, 2005	108
The team is playing pirates in Rocket's hangar when they hear music in what turns out to be a treasure map. However, Big Jet sees the map too, and tries to get to the treasure. Now it will be up to the team to find the treasure before Big Jet does. Art featured: Under the Great Wave off Kanagawa by Katsushika Hokusai, Tahitian Mountains by Paul Gauguin Music featured: Carmen Suite No. 1 by Georges Bizet
6	6	"The Birthday Balloons"	Jeff Borkin	Barrett Benica and Kelly Peterson	October 13, 2005	102
It is Annie's birthday and her friends are setting up things for the party. Her favorite things are balloons, and they give her musical balloons which play a special song. But suddenly, a strong gust of wind blows them all away, so it is up to the team to retrieve Annie's balloons before they reach Antarctica. Art featured: The Merry Jesters by Henri Rousseau Music featured: Eine kleine Nachtmusik by Wolfgang Amadeus Mozart
7	7	"The Legend of the Golden Pyramid"	Jeff Borkin	Barrett Benica and Kelly Peterson	October 14, 2005	109
The team is in Egypt, reading the hieroglyphics about the story of the Golden Pyramid. It says that inside the pyramid are musical notes which make the hieroglyphic pictures dance and become happy, until a mean King locked the notes behind the gates. Now, it is up to the team to use the golden harp, which opens anything, to open the Golden Pyramid. Art featured: Ancient Egyptian Hieroglyphics Music featured: Hungarian Dance No. 5 by Johannes Brahms
8	8	"Dragon Kite"	Jill Cozza	Barrett Benica and Kelly Peterson	October 17, 2005	110
June finds a little dragon kite flying toward her and she shows the team a picture of the Dragon Kite Parade in China. However, Little Dragon Kite has a fear of flying high, and the dragon kites on the picture are missing, so it is up to the team to find the missing dragon kites and help their friend overcome her fear. Art featured: Works by Chinese painters Zosan, Cai Jia, Zhang Lu, Qiu Ying Music featured: Peer Gynt Suite No. 1 by Edvard Grieg
9	9	"Go West, Young Train"	Claudia Silver	Barrett Benica and Kelly Peterson	October 21, 2005	114
The team meets their friend Little Red Train, carrying a bag of party supplies; suddenly, Big Jet steals the bag, and it is up to the team and Little Red Train to retrieve the bag from Big Jet before the party starts. Art featured: Navajo Baskets Music featured: L'Arlésienne Suite No. 2 by Georges Bizet
10	10	"Farmer Annie"	Jill Cozza	Barrett Benica and Kelly Peterson	October 24, 2005	116
The team flies to a farm and meets their best friends, the three little pigs, and decides to plant mystery seeds by doing four things: plant, water, give sunshine, and give love on the list to see what grows in those mystery seeds. Works featured: The Olive Trees with Yellow Sky and Sun by Vincent van Gogh Music featured: Brandenburg Concerto No. 5, 1st Movement: Allegro by Johann Sebastian Bach
11	11	"A Little Einsteins Halloween"	Jeff Borkin	Barrett Benica and Kelly Peterson	October 29, 2005	115
The team is filling up their pumpkin with Halloween treats for a costume party when they suddenly hear some strange music and they suddenly see a ghost approaching them. Now, it is up to the team to hurry and gather their treats until their pumpkin gets filled to the top, so they can go to the party while avoiding the ghost and any more of them. Art featured: September: Harvesting Grapes by The Limbourg Brothers Music featured: Peer Gynt Suite No. 1 by Edvard Grieg
12	12	"Annie's Solo Mission"	Jeff Borkin	Barrett Benica and Kelly Peterson	November 14, 2005	118
Leo is teaching his sister Annie how to fly Rocket, and she learns all about Rocket's three different types of moves (the up-down move, the squeeze, and the loop-the-loop maneuver). After teaching her, Quincy and June invite Leo to blow Super Bubbles, so Annie gets her camera and tries to take a picture. After she leaves though, they accidentally get stuck in a giant bubble after blowing together to make it. Now, it will be up to Annie to pilot Rocket solo and save the rest of the team (Leo, Quincy, and June) before the bubble pops. Art featured: Expectation by Gustav Klimt Music featured: L'Arlésienne Suite No. 2 by Georges Bizet
13	13	"The Mouse and the Moon"	Eric Weiner	Barrett Benica and Kelly Peterson	November 21, 2005	119
While camping, the team watches the moon shine in the sky when a little mouse arrives with a present for the moon, only for it to move to Switzerland. Now, it is up to the team to go to Switzerland so that Little Mouse can give his present to the moon before it goes down. Art featured: Ancient Greek and Roman Mosaics Music featured: Eine kleine Nachtmusik by Wolfgang Amadeus Mozart
14	14	"The Good Knight and the Bad Knight"	Jeff Borkin	Barrett Benica and Kelly Peterson	December 5, 2005	120
Leo is telling a story about a good knight and a bad knight. The good knight is a happy and funny knight in the castle, until the bad knight imprisons him in one of the towers and he can not escape. Now, it is up to the team to get the musical key in order to release the good knight before the bad knight strikes. Art featured: Chessboard with Flower Border by Giovanni Battista Sassi and Bayeux Tapestry Music featured: Peer Gynt Suite No. 1 by Edvard Grieg
15	15	"The Christmas Wish"	Jeff Borkin	Barrett Benica and Kelly Peterson	December 12, 2005	113
On Christmas Eve, Leo and the team are reading a story about the boy who uses a wish box to get a turtle. The team receives wish boxes under the tree. Unfortunately, Annie does not have a wish box because it fell off Santa's sleigh during a heavy blizzard. Now, it is up to the team to find Annie's wish box while enduring the cold. Art featured: The Starry Night by Vincent van Gogh Music featured: Für Elise, Rondo in C major, Allegretto in C minor, and Bagatelle in E-flat major by Ludwig van Beethoven
16	16	"How We Became the Little Einsteins: The True Story"	Eric Weiner	Barrett Benica and Kelly Peterson	January 8, 2006	112
The team calls for Rocket, using the musical toy that Leo had when he was a baby, and it works. However, Rocket is too large to live with the gang. The team decides to find a home for Rocket to live in so that Rocket can be together with the gang. Art featured: Watercolor paintings of Venice by John Singer Sargent Music featured: Symphony No. 9 in E minor, "From the New World" by Antonín Dvořák
17	17	"Jump for Joey"	Jeff Borkin	Barrett Benica and Kelly Peterson	January 26, 2006	122
The team is in Australia, training their new friend, Joey, the baby kangaroo, for the Animal Talent Show in Sydney Opera House. His talent is super hopping, which he uses to hop higher and longer. But Joey forgets that the talent show is today, so it is up to the team to let Joey join in the talent show before it starts. Art featured: Australian aboriginal art Music featured: Carmen Suite No. 1 by Georges Bizet
18	18	"The Northern Night Light"	Jeff Borkin	Barrett Benica and Kelly Peterson	February 20, 2006	105
Quincy is singing his silly song to make the gang laugh, including Rocket, and they end up in Lapland. While watching a group of reindeer, they see a baby reindeer chasing a bird until it goes too far and gets lost in the woods. This makes the mission tough because Quincy has a fear of the dark as Lapland gets dark too early. So it is up to the team to take the baby reindeer back to his mother as darkness falls and Quincy is forced to face his fear (with the Northern Lights helping them). Art featured: The Road to the Farm of Saint-Siméon in Winter by Claude Monet Music featured: The Tale of Tsar Saltan by Nikolai Rimsky-Korsakov
19	19	"O Yes, O Yes, It's Springtime!"	Douglas Wood	Barrett Benica and Kelly Peterson	March 20, 2006	117
The team has a flower named Baby Tulip, which is about to bloom, but Big Jet arrives with a seasons machine, which changes seasons to prevent Baby Tulip from blooming, so it is up to the team to go back to springtime so that their friend can grow and bloom. It is also up to them to not let Big Jet prevent it from happening. Art featured: Mountains and River on the Kiso Road by Utagawa Hiroshige Music featured: The Four Seasons by Antonio Vivaldi
20	20	"A Tall Totem Tale"	Jill Cozza	Barrett Benica and Kelly Peterson	April 17, 2006	121
The team is in Alaska in Totem Pole Forest, looking at the tall totem poles. They meet a small totem pole; he has no stories though, so they decide to help the little totem pole grow larger so that he can grow like the rest of the poles. But then, he gets washed out to sea, and it is up to the team to bring him back so he can grow big with the other totems. Art featured: Pacific Northwest totem poles Music featured: Orchestral Suite No. 2 in B minor by Johann Sebastian Bach
21	21	"The Incredible Shrinking Adventure"	Jill Cozza	Barrett Benica and Kelly Peterson	May 6, 2006	123
The team discovers a machine which makes things larger when it plays larger and louder notes, and become smaller when it plays smaller and softer notes. However, the machine starts to malfunction until it breaks, causing the Little Einsteins and Rocket to shrink, so it is up to the team to find the lost piece on the playground so that they can return to their original size. Art featured: Twelve Arles Sunflowers in a Vase by Vincent van Gogh Music featured: The Four Seasons by Antonio Vivaldi
22	22	"Duck, Duck, June"	Jeff Borkin	Barrett Benica and Kelly Peterson	May 14, 2006	111
The team sees a mother duck, together with her ducklings as they hatch from their eggs. They follow their mother until one of them hatches late and follows the gang by accident, because he follows June's whistling, thinking that she is his mother. Now, it is up to the team to bring the duck back to his mother before she becomes worried. Art featured: On the River Greta by John Atkinson Grimshaw Music featured: Horn Concertos by Wolfgang Amadeus Mozart
23	23	"Rocket Safari"	Jeff Borkin	Barrett Benica and Kelly Peterson	June 19, 2006	107
The team is on a safari, watching the animals in Africa, until they find that the water is overflowing on the wildebeests, so Rocket blocks the waterfall with his body. However, Rocket is stuck, and a little bumblebee joins the team, and it is up to them to find the largest animals in Africa that can help them pull Rocket out of the cold waterfall before he gets a cold. Art featured: Woodcut of a Rhinoceros and St. Jerome by the Pollard Willow by Albrecht Dürer Music featured: The Tale of Tsar Saltan by Nikolai Rimsky-Korsakov
24	24	"Knock on Wood"	Jeff Borkin	Barrett Benica and Kelly Peterson	July 10, 2006	126
The team sees the other animals living and playing with their friends. They find an ivory-billed woodpecker pecking on the wood on the tree. He tries to peck the wood to call another ivory bill woodpecker, though it is far away. Now, it is up to the team to go on top of the mountain so that the ivory-billed woodpecker can peck his beak on the wood to make a loud sound so that his friend can go to him. Art featured: Pool in the Woods by George Inness Music featured: Orchestral Suite No. 2 in B minor by Johann Sebastian Bach
25	25	"A Galactic Goodnight"	Jeff Borkin	Barrett Benica and Kelly Peterson	August 14, 2006	124
The team has a sleepover and they show their own methods on how to sleep. However, they hear something and notice that Rocket was unable to sleep. Even their own attempts to make him sleep fail, so the team decides to go to outer space and count the nine planets of the Solar System to make Rocket go to sleep. Works featured: The Scream by Edvard Munch Music featured: Für Elise, The Appassionata, and Moonlight Sonata by Ludwig van Beethoven
26	26	"The Birthday Machine"	Olexa Hewryk	Barrett Benica and Kelly Peterson	October 20, 2006	125
The team finds a paper about a unique birthday machine. With the information on the paper in hand, the team tries to make their birthdays by finding three things used to make the machine to accomplish that. Art featured: The Laurentian Library by Michelangelo Buonarroti Music featured: Brandenburg Concerto No. 5, 1st Movement: Allegro by Johann Sebastian Bach
27	27	"A Brand New Outfit"	Eric Weiner	Barrett Benica and Bob Cavin III	November 6, 2006	127
The team finds a caterpillar singing on a toadstool. Their friend goes to the tree of many colors with the other caterpillars on the truck to get a brand new outfit, until the truck hits a bump which throws Little Caterpillar off the truck. Now, it is up to the team to bring him to the tree of many colors so that he can get a brand new outfit. Art featured: Wheat Field with Cypresses by Vincent van Gogh, Under the Great Wave off Kanagawa by Katsushika Hokusai Music featured: Ode to Joy by Ludwig van Beethoven
28	28	"The Missing Invitation"	Eric Weiner	Barrett Benica and Bob Cavin III	November 20, 2006	128
The team, with their friend Butterfly, sees that the other butterflies have an invitation to a migration party in Angangueo, Mexico, only to discover that Butterfly does not have his invitation. The mail carrier butterfly says that his invitation is in a mailbox except in the wrong place. Now, it is up to the team to search around the United States to find it. Art featured: Young Woman in the Garden by Claude Monet, Navajo Woven Art Music featured: Ode to Joy by Ludwig van Beethoven
