= List of Little Einsteins episodes =

This list of Little Einsteins episodes gives the date and plot for each broadcast of the children's television series Little Einsteins during 2005–2009. The series followed on from a direct-to-DVD release, Our Huge Adventure (later re-released as episodes 27 and 28 of Season 1, "A Brand New Outfit" and "The Missing Invitation" respectively), and was followed by a second double-length episode, Rocket's Firebird Rescue in 2007.

== Series overview ==
Season	Episodes	Originally released	
Season	Episodes	First released	Last released
1	28	October 9, 2005	November 20, 2006
2	39	January 13, 2007	December 22, 2009

== Episodes ==
=== Season 1 (2005–2006) ===
No. overall	No. in season	Title	Written by	Storyboard by	Original release date	Prod. code
1	1	"I Love to Conduct" (Note: While most episode guides list "Ring Around the Planet" as the first episode, "I Love to Conduct" is the first episode to be broadcast, and is technically counted as the first episode of the series.)	Eric Weiner	Barrett Benica and Kelly Peterson	October 9, 2005	104
The team watches the sunrise and things becoming happy. They see a bald eagle picking up sticks; soon after though, she mistakenly takes Leo's baton, and it is up to the team to retrieve it from the bald eagle. Art featured: The Peaceable Kingdom by Edward Hicks Music featured: Peer Gynt Suite No. 1: Morning Mood by Edvard Grieg
2	2	"Ring Around the Planet"	Jeff Borkin	Barrett Benica and Kelly Peterson	October 9, 2005	101
June watches the stars and the planets from her telescope and loves the planet Saturn; she wants to dance with it. Suddenly, Saturn begins to play faster, then one of its rings comes loose, falls off, and lands in her garden, so it is up to the team to bring the ring back to Saturn. Art featured: Tree of Life by Gustav Klimt Music featured: Symphony No. 9 "From the New World" by Antonín Dvořák
3	3	"Hungarian Hiccups"	Jill Cozza	Barrett Benica and Kelly Peterson	October 10, 2005	103
Rocket participates in the Great Sky Race. However, he meets his nemesis, another competitor named Big Jet, and is nervous about racing him, although the team reassures him. To complicate matters, Rocket starts having the hiccups, so it is up to the team to scare them off before the sky race begins. Art featured: Tiger in a Tropical Storm by Henri Rousseau Music featured: Hungarian Dance No. 5 by Johannes Brahms
4	4	"Whale Tale"	Douglas Wood	Barrett Benica and Kelly Peterson	October 11, 2005	106
At the beach, the team is making sand castles while Rocket is playing with his new friend, a little humpback whale, until the whale's mother calls him home, much to Rocket's sadness as he begins to miss his friend. The team decides to go to the ocean to find Little Whale so Rocket can be happy again. Art featured: The Shore at Bas-Butin, Honfleur by Georges Seurat Music featured: Horn Concerto No. 2 in E Flat by Wolfgang Amadeus Mozart
5	5	"Pirate's Treasure"	Claudia Silver	Barrett Benica and Kelly Peterson	October 12, 2005	108
The team plays as pirates in Rocket's hangar when they hear music from what turns out to be a treasure map. However, Big Jet sees the map too, and tries to get to the treasure. Now it will be up to the team to find the treasure before Big Jet does. Art featured: Under the Wave off Kanagawa by Katsushika Hokusai, Tahitian Mountains by Paul Gauguin Music featured: Carmen Suite No. 1 by Georges Bizet
6	6	"The Birthday Balloons"	Jeff Borkin	Barrett Benica and Kelly Peterson	October 13, 2005	102
It is Annie's birthday and her friends set up things for the party. Her favorite things are balloons, and they give her musical balloons which play a special song. But suddenly, a strong gust of wind blows them all away, so it is up to the team to retrieve Annie's balloons before they reach Antarctica. Art featured: The Merry Jesters by Henri Rousseau Music featured: Eine kleine Nachtmusik by Wolfgang Amadeus Mozart
7	7	"The Legend of the Golden Pyramid"	Jeff Borkin	Barrett Benica and Kelly Peterson	October 14, 2005	109
The team is in Egypt, reading the hieroglyphics about the story of the Golden Pyramid. It says that inside the pyramid are musical notes which make the hieroglyphic pictures dance and become happy, until a mean king locked the notes behind the gates. Now, it is up to the team to use the golden harp, which opens anything, to open the Golden Pyramid. Art featured: Ancient Egyptian Hieroglyphics Music featured: Hungarian Dance No. 5 by Johannes Brahms
8	8	"Dragon Kite"	Jill Cozza	Barrett Benica and Kelly Peterson	October 17, 2005	110
June finds a little dragon kite flying towards her and she shows the team a picture of the Dragon Kite Parade in China. However, Little Dragon Kite has a fear of flying high, and the dragon kites in the picture are missing, so it is up to the team to find the missing dragon kites and help their friend overcome her fear. Art featured: Works by Chinese painters Zosan, Cai Jia, Zhang Lu, Qiu Ying Music featured: Peer Gynt Suite No. 1: In the Hall of the Mountain King by Edvard Grieg
9	9	"Go West, Young Train"	Claudia Silver	Barrett Benica and Kelly Peterson	October 21, 2005	114
The team meets their friend Little Red Train, carrying a bag of party supplies; suddenly, Big Jet steals the bag, and it is up to the team and Little Red Train to retrieve the bag from Big Jet before the party starts. Art featured: Navajo baskets Music featured: L'Arlésienne Suite No. 2 by Georges Bizet
10	10	"Farmer Annie"	Jill Cozza	Barrett Benica and Kelly Peterson	October 24, 2005	116
The team flies to a farm and meet their best friends, the Three Little Pigs, and decide to plant mystery seeds by doing four things: plant, water, give sunshine, and give love to see what grows in those mystery seeds. Works featured: The Olive Trees with Yellow Sky and Sun by Vincent van Gogh Music featured: Brandenburg Concerto No. 5 by Johann Sebastian Bach
11	11	"A Little Einsteins Halloween"	Jeff Borkin	Barrett Benica and Kelly Peterson	October 29, 2005	115
The team is filling up their pumpkin with Halloween treats for a costume party when they suddenly hear some strange music and see a ghost approaching them. Now, it is up to the team to hurry and gather their treats until their pumpkin gets filled to the top, so they can go to the party while avoiding the ghost and any more of them. Art featured: September: Harvesting Grapes by the Limbourg Brothers Music featured: Peer Gynt Suite No. 1: In the Hall of the Mountain King by Edvard Grieg
12	12	"Annie's Solo Mission"	Jeff Borkin	Barrett Benica and Kelly Peterson	November 14, 2005	118
Leo teaches his sister Annie how to fly Rocket, and she learns all about Rocket's three different types of moves: the up-down move, the squeeze, and the loop-the-loop maneuver. After teaching her, Quincy and June invite Leo to blow Super Bubbles, so Annie gets her camera and tries to take a picture. After she leaves though, they accidentally get stuck in a giant bubble after blowing together to make it. Now, it is up to Annie to pilot Rocket solo and save the rest of her friends before the bubble pops. Art featured: Expectation by Gustav Klimt Music featured: L'Arlésienne Suite No. 2 by Georges Bizet
13	13	"The Mouse and the Moon"	Eric Weiner	Barrett Benica and Kelly Peterson	November 21, 2005	119
While camping, the team watches the moon shine in the sky when a little mouse arrives with a present for the moon, only for it to move to the Matterhorn mountain in Switzerland. Now, it is up to the team to go to Switzerland so that Little Mouse can give his present to the moon before it goes down. Art featured: Ancient Greek and Roman mosaics Music featured: Eine kleine Nachtmusik by Wolfgang Amadeus Mozart
14	14	"The Good Knight and the Bad Knight"	Jeff Borkin	Barrett Benica and Kelly Peterson	December 5, 2005	120
Leo tells a story about a good knight and a bad knight. The Good Knight is a happy and funny knight in the castle, until the Bad Knight imprisons him in one of the towers and he can not escape. Now, it is up to the team to get the musical key in order to release the Good Knight before the Bad Knight strikes. Art featured: Chessboard with Flower Border by Giovanni Battista Sassi and Bayeux Tapestry Music featured: Peer Gynt Suite No. 1: Morning Mood by Edvard Grieg
15	15	"The Christmas Wish"	Jeff Borkin	Barrett Benica and Kelly Peterson	December 12, 2005	113
On Christmas Eve, Leo and the team read a story about a boy who uses a wish box to get a turtle. The team receive wish boxes under the tree. Unfortunately, Annie does not have a wish box because it fell off Santa's sleigh during a heavy blizzard. Now, it is up to the team to find Annie's wish box on Mount Everest while enduring the cold. Art featured: The Starry Night by Vincent van Gogh Music featured: Für Elise by Ludwig van Beethoven
16	16	"How We Became the Little Einsteins: The True Story"	Eric Weiner	Barrett Benica and Kelly Peterson	January 8, 2006	112
The team calls for Rocket, using the musical toy that Leo had when he was a baby, and it works. However, Rocket is too large to live with the team. The team decides to find a home for Rocket to live in so that he can be together with the team. Art featured: Watercolor paintings of Venice by John Singer Sargent Music featured: Symphony No. 9 "From the New World" by Antonín Dvořák
17	17	"Jump for Joey"	Jeff Borkin	Barrett Benica and Kelly Peterson	January 26, 2006	122
The team is in Australia, training their new friend, Joey, the baby kangaroo, for the Animal Talent Show at the Sydney Opera House. His talent is super hopping, which he uses to hop higher and longer. But Joey forgets that the talent show is today, so it is up to the team to bring Joey to the talent show before it starts. Art featured: Australian aboriginal art Music featured: Carmen Suite No. 1 by Georges Bizet
18	18	"The Northern Night Light"	Jeff Borkin	Barrett Benica and Kelly Peterson	February 20, 2006	105
Quincy sings his silly song to make the team laugh, including Rocket, and they end up in Lapland. While watching a group of reindeer, they see a baby reindeer chasing a bird until he goes too far and gets lost in the woods. This makes the mission tough because Quincy has a fear of the dark as Lapland gets dark too early. So it is up to the team to take Baby Reindeer back to his mother as darkness falls while Quincy has to face his fear (with the Northern Lights helping them). Art featured: Road from Saint-Siméon Farm in Winter by Claude Monet Music featured: Flight of the Bumblebee by Nikolai Rimsky-Korsakov
19	19	"O Yes, O Yes, It's Springtime!"	Douglas Wood	Barrett Benica and Kelly Peterson	March 20, 2006	117
The team has a baby tulip which is about to bloom, but Big Jet arrives with a seasons machine, which changes seasons to prevent Baby Tulip from blooming, so it is up to the team to go back to springtime so that their friend can grow and bloom. Art featured: Mountains and River on the Kiso Road by Utagawa Hiroshige Music featured: The Four Seasons: Spring by Antonio Vivaldi
20	20	"A Tall Totem Tale"	Jill Cozza	Barrett Benica and Kelly Peterson	April 17, 2006	121
The team is in Totem Pole Forest in Alaska, looking at the tall totem poles. They meet a little totem pole; he has no stories though, so they decide to help Little Totem Pole grow larger so that he can grow like the rest of the poles. But then, he gets washed out to sea, and it is up to the team to bring Little Totem Pole back so he can grow big with the other totems. Art featured: Pacific Northwest totem poles Music featured: Orchestral Suite No. 2 by Johann Sebastian Bach
21	21	"The Incredible Shrinking Adventure"	Jill Cozza	Barrett Benica and Kelly Peterson	May 6, 2006	123
The team discovers a machine which makes things larger when it plays larger and louder notes, and become smaller when it plays smaller and softer notes. However, the machine starts to malfunction until it breaks, causing the Little Einsteins and Rocket to shrink, so it is up to the team to find the lost piece at the playground so that they can return to their original size. Art featured: Sunflowers by Vincent van Gogh Music featured: The Four Seasons: Spring by Antonio Vivaldi
22	22	"Duck, Duck, June"	Jeff Borkin	Barrett Benica and Kelly Peterson	May 14, 2006	111
The team sees a mother duck, together with her ducklings as they hatch from their eggs. They follow their mother until one of them hatches late and follows the team by accident, because he followed June's whistling, thinking that she is his mother. Now, it is up to the team to bring the duckling back to his mother before she becomes worried. Art featured: On the River Greta by John Atkinson Grimshaw Music featured: Horn Concerto No. 2 in E Flat by Wolfgang Amadeus Mozart
23	23	"Rocket Safari"	Jeff Borkin	Barrett Benica and Kelly Peterson	June 19, 2006 (Note: This episode was first released in Team Up for Adventure DVD on April 25, 2006.)	107
The team is on a safari, watching the animals in Africa, until they find that the water is overflowing for the wildebeests, so Rocket blocks the waterfall with his body. However, Rocket gets stuck, so it is up to the team, accompanied by a little bumblebee, to find the largest animals in Africa that can help them pull Rocket out of the waterfall before he gets a cold. Art featured: Woodcut of a rhinoceros and St. Jerome by the Pollard Willow by Albrecht Dürer Music featured: Flight of the Bumblebee by Nikolai Rimsky-Korsakov
24	24	"Knock on Wood"	Jeff Borkin	Barrett Benica and Kelly Peterson	July 10, 2006	126
The team sees the other animals living and playing with their friends. They find an ivory-billed woodpecker pecking on the wood of a tree. He tries to peck the wood to call another ivory-billed woodpecker, though it is far away. Now, it is up to the team to go on top of the mountain so that the ivory-billed woodpecker can peck his beak on the wood to make a loud sound so that his friend can go to him. Art featured: Pool in the Woods by George Inness Music featured: Orchestral Suite No. 2 by Johann Sebastian Bach
25	25	"A Galactic Goodnight"	Jeff Borkin	Barrett Benica and Kelly Peterson	August 14, 2006	124
The team has a sleepover and they show their own methods on how to sleep. However, they hear something and notice that Rocket is unable to sleep. Even their own attempts to make him sleep fail, so the team decide to go to outer space and count the nine planets of the Solar System to make Rocket go to sleep. Works featured: The Scream by Edvard Munch Music featured: Für Elise by Ludwig van Beethoven
26	26	"The Birthday Machine"	Olexa Hewryk	Barrett Benica and Kelly Peterson	October 20, 2006 (Note: This episode was first released in Mission Celebration! DVD on August 22, 2006.)	125
The team finds a paper about a unique birthday machine. With the information on the paper in hand, the team tries to make their birthdays by finding the three parts used to make the machine. Art featured: The Laurentian Library by Michelangelo Music featured: Brandenburg Concerto No. 5 by Johann Sebastian Bach
27	27	"A Brand New Outfit"	Eric Weiner	Barrett Benica and Bob Cavin III	November 6, 2006 (Note: This episode was first released in Our Huge Adventure VHS/DVD on August 23, 2005.)	127
The team finds a caterpillar singing on a toadstool. Their new friend attempts to go to the tree of many colors with the other caterpillars on a truck to get a brand new outfit, until the truck hits a bump which throws him off the truck. Now, it is up to the team to bring Little Caterpillar to the tree so that he can get a brand new outfit. Art featured: Wheat Field with Cypresses by Vincent van Gogh, Under the Wave off Kanagawa by Katsushika Hokusai Music featured: Ode to Joy by Ludwig van Beethoven
28	28	"The Missing Invitation"	Eric Weiner	Barrett Benica and Bob Cavin III	November 20, 2006	128
The team and their friend Butterfly see that the other butterflies have an invitation to a migration party in Angangueo, Mexico, only to discover that Butterfly does not have his invitation. The mail carrier butterfly says that his invitation is in a mailbox except in the wrong place. Now, it is up to the team to search around the United States to find it. Art featured: Young Woman in the Garden by Claude Monet, the Navajo Woven Art Music featured: Ode to Joy by Ludwig van Beethoven

=== Season 2 (2007–2009) ===
No. overall	No. in season	Title	Supervising direction by	Written by	Storyboard by	Original release date	Prod. code
29	1	"Quincy and the Magic Instruments"	Andy Thom	Jennifer Brooke Hamburg	Barrett Benica, Kelly Peterson and Geoffrey Johnson	January 13, 2007	203
Quincy finds four magic instruments in his room: a magic flute, a magic trumpet, a magic harp, and a little magic triangle. Then, he gets an e-mail message that the rest of his friends are in trouble. Rocket's anchor is tangled and stuck on a rock below the Arabian Sea, and the waves are getting higher and larger. Because of this problem, the team cannot blast off, so it is up to Quincy and his magic instruments to rescue the others before they get seasick. Art featured: The Wave by Gustave Courbet Music featured: Swan Lake by Pyotr Ilyich Tchaikovsky
30	2	"Brothers and Sisters to the Rescue"	Andy Thom	Jessica Lissy	Barrett Benica, Kelly Peterson and Geoffrey Johnson	January 13, 2007	204
Leo and Annie read a story about Hansel and Gretel. The two children leave a trail of musical notes to avoid getting lost. They find a gingerbread house and eat all the sweets, but they are unaware that the gingerbread house is owned by a witch and Hansel and Gretel are locked in. Now, it is up to Leo and Annie along with the rest of the team to open the gingerbread house and rescue Hansel and Gretel before the witch strikes. Art featured: German folk art Music featured: Symphony No. 5 by Ludwig van Beethoven
31	3	"The Glass Slipper Ball"	Andy Thom	Jeff Borkin	Barrett Benica, Kelly Peterson and Geoffrey Johnson	January 29, 2007	202
June does dancing lessons and Rocket is a fan of hers, except that Rocket does not know how to dance yet. The team hear a bell and June looks at her telescope, seeing a glass slipper at a ball which she wants to try on. It is up to the team to go to the ball at the Schönbrunn Palace in Vienna, Austria so that June can try the glass slipper before the clock strikes twelve, while helping Rocket learn how to dance along the way. Art featured: Fish by Andy Warhol Music featured: The Blue Danube Waltz by Johann Strauss
32	4	"Annie's Love Song"	Andy Thom	Alana Burgi Sanko	Barrett Benica, Kelly Peterson and Geoffrey Johnson	February 14, 2007	209
The team is at the beach looking at the seashells when they see two hermit crabs pinching their claws as a way of saying hello. Annie sees them singing their friendship song, so she sings with them with her microphone. Their song makes the other animals play with their friends, until a big wave washes the red hermit crab off to sea. Now, it is up to the team to help the lonely blue hermit crab rescue his friend before he gets caught in a crab trap. Works featured: Guna Molas Music featured: Piano Concerto No. 21 by Wolfgang Amadeus Mozart
33	5	"Melody, the Music Pet"	Andy Thom	Anne Lund	Barrett Benica, Kelly Peterson and Geoffrey Johnson	February 26, 2007	206
The team stands near the pet train when they see a pet with musical notes. Leo calls her Melody because she sings music, and her favorite food is musical notes. The pets are going on the train with their tickets, but Melody cannot go on the train without her ticket, so it is up to the team to go to the Eiffel Tower in Paris, France to get Melody's ticket before the pet train leaves. Art featured: Water Lilies by Claude Monet Music featured: Humoresque No. 7 by Antonín Dvořák
34	6	"The Puppet Princess"	Andy Thom	Jeff Borkin	Barrett Benica, Kelly Peterson and Geoffrey Johnson	March 12, 2007	205
The team meets three silly puppets while marching, who can be silly and funny. The puppets plan to go to the puppet theater in Prague, Czech Republic on their carriage, but it hits a bump which throws them out of the carriage. Now, it is up to the team to bring the puppets to the theater before it starts. Art featured: Drawings by Leonardo da Vinci Music featured: Funeral March of a Marionette by Charles Francois Gounod
35	7	"Super Fast!"	Andy Thom	Rodney Stringfellow	Barrett Benica, Kelly Peterson and Geoffrey Johnson	March 26, 2007	207
The team goes to the gas station to fill up Rocket with musical gas, allowing him to go at any speed. Rocket's speed meter has four types of speed, corresponding to four of the common tempo markings: Adagio means slow, Moderato means moderate, Allegro means fast, and Presto means super fast. In the meantime, they see the Three Little Pigs flying their planes until their speed meter gets stuck, causing them to lose control. The first plane is stuck on Adagio, the second plane is stuck on Moderato, and the third plane is stuck on Allegro. Now, it is up to the team to rescue the Three Little Pigs before their planes go to outer space. Art featured: Chinese paper art Music featured: William Tell Overture by Gioacchino Rossini
36	8	"He Speaks Music!"	Andy Thom	Siobhan Vivian	Barrett Benica, Kelly Peterson and Geoffrey Johnson	April 9, 2007	208
The team is in Africa, looking at the animals who have their babies. They find a baby chimpanzee taken by a poacher, except he sings sadly because he was born after his parents went somewhere. He speaks music, so Annie translates by singing his song with her microphone so that the team understands what he says. The team decide to go to the Komoe National Park to bring the baby chimp to his parents. Art featured: African masks Music featured: The Moldau by Bedrich Smetana
37	9	"Hello, Cello"	Andy Thom	Abby Miller Pecoriello	Barrett Benica, Kelly Peterson and Geoffrey Johnson	April 23, 2007	210
The team is in Cremona, Italy, seeing Mommy Cello with her baby cellos' cases, until one of them gets washed away in the river. When the last baby cello hatches, it gets close to Quincy because it thinks he is its mother. It is up to the team to bring Baby Cello back to its mother before she gets worried. Art featured: Langlois Bridge with Woman Washing by Vincent van Gogh Music featured: Symphony No. 8: Unfinished Symphony by Franz Schubert
38	10	"Annie and the Little Toy Plane"	Andy Thom	Brian L. Perkins	Barrett Benica, Kelly Peterson and Geoffrey Johnson	May 4, 2007 (Note: This episode was first released in The Legend of the Golden Pyramid DVD on February 27, 2007.)	201
The team is in San Francisco, California and Annie has a small purple plane which flies higher when she sings higher. They start to sing low and every time Annie raises her voice (in a glissando) and her hands, Purple Plane flies higher and higher. In the meantime, they see a green helicopter stuck on top on the tallest redwood tree. It is up to the team and Purple Plane to fly over the highest landmarks and rescue Green Helicopter before he falls down. Art featured: Untitled 1988 by Keith Haring Music featured: Symphony No. 40 by Wolfgang Amadeus Mozart
39	11	"Carmine's Big Race"	Andy Thom	Brian L. Perkins	Barrett Benica, Kelly Peterson and Geoffrey Johnson	May 12, 2007	211
The team watches the F1 race of the fastest race cars. They see one car which is different, with a trumpet engine, a trombone horn, and bass drum wheels. Quincy calls him Carmine because he is a music car who wants to race. The three mean race cars which are bigger than Carmine tease and discourage him so that he can lose. Now, it is up to the team to help Carmine beat the other race cars and win the race. Art featured: The Vines by Paul Ranson Music featured: Rondeau by Jean-Joseph Mouret
40	12	"The Great Sky Race Rematch"	Andy Thom	Brian L. Perkins	Barrett Benica, Kelly Peterson and Geoffrey Johnson	May 12, 2007	215
Last season, Rocket won the race, so he has a rematch against Big Jet. Rocket has four buttons: a submarine, a pogo bouncer, a train, and his flying button. However, when the race starts, Big Jet destroys the flying button. Now, it is up to the team to help Rocket win the trophy and avoid Big Jet's attempts to slow them down while Quincy repairs the flying button. Art featured: Wild Sea Breaking on the Rocks by Utagawa Hiroshige Music featured: William Tell Overture by Gioacchino Rossini
41	13	"Sleeping Bassoon"	Andy Thom	Jeff Borkin	Barrett Benica, Kelly Peterson and Geoffrey Johnson	June 25, 2007	212
Quincy tells a story about a princess bassoon playing a happy song for the other instruments, but an evil grumpy wizard casts a magic spell, which puts Princess Bassoon to sleep. The other instruments cannot wake the princess up, so it is up to the team to wake the princess up from the sleeping spell before all the purple pebbles in the hourglass reach the bottom or the spell will be permanent. Works featured: Variegated Black by Wassily Kandinsky Music featured: Wedding March by Felix Mendelssohn
42	14	"Rocket Soup"	Andy Thom	Abby Miller Pecoriello	Barrett Benica, Kelly Peterson and Geoffrey Johnson	July 30, 2007	213
The team plays in the yard until they hear a stomach grumbling, which is from Rocket, who is hungry. So the team decides to make an energy meal for Rocket called Rocket Soup by gathering three ingredients - cheese from Little Mouse, peas from the Good Knight, and musical jumping beans from Joey - so that Rocket can get back his energy. Art featured: Moonrise by Paul Klee Music featured: Humoresque No. 7 by Antonín Dvořák
43	15	"The Blue-Footed Booby Bird Ballet"	Andy Thom	Jeff Borkin	Barrett Benica, Kelly Peterson and Geoffrey Johnson	August 20, 2007	216
June does dance lessons with four blue-footed booby birds and when they performed well, they will earn a sticker. The baby booby bird wants to dance with the big birds, but he is still learning, so June encourages him to do his best. The three ballet moves are arabesque - stretch body, bourrée - on tip toes, and port de bras - arms low, then high. They leave on a boat going to the Galápagos Islands, though the boat hits a wave, throwing Baby Booby Bird off. Now, it is up to the team to help Baby Booby Bird dance and get to the Galápagos Islands before the ballet recital starts. Art featured: Ica Stones Music featured: Swan Lake by Pyotr Ilyich Tchaikovsky
44	16	"Little Red Rockethood"	Andy Thom	Abby Miller Pecoriello	Barrett Benica, Kelly Peterson and Geoffrey Johnson	September 14, 2007	220
Based on "Little Red Riding Hood", Rocket plays as Little Red Rockethood. The team has made Rocket Soup for his Grandma Rocket, who feels ill in the hangar. However, Big Jet steals the Rocket Soup, and it is up to the team to retrieve the Rocket Soup from Big Jet before he eats it all up. Art featured: Landscape Near Murnau by Alexej von Jawlensky Music featured: Aida by Giuseppe Verdi
45	17	"The Puzzle of the Sphinx"	Andy Thom	Brian L. Perkins	Barrett Benica, Kelly Peterson and Geoffrey Johnson	October 18, 2007	218
The team is in Egypt, where they meet their friend the Great Sphinx. He shows them his snowflake puzzle and the team is impressed, until the puzzle pieces bounce away, which makes the Great Sphinx sad, so it is up to the team to find the three puzzle pieces before all the sand of the hourglass goes to the bottom or the puzzle will never be able to do its magic. Art featured: Ancient Egyptian Sculpture Music featured: Aida by Giuseppe Verdi
46	18	"The Wild Goose Chase"	Andy Thom	Jeff Borkin	Barrett Benica, Kelly Peterson and Geoffrey Johnson	October 29, 2007	219
The team watches the migration of the red-feathered geese going to a place south for the winter where it is warm, until they reach a cloudy place where the baby goose follows Rocket because he got confused in the clouds. Now, it is up to the team to help Baby Goose find his family and help him grow red feathers so that he can be part of the family. Art featured: Circles in a Circle by Wassily Kandinsky Music featured: Symphony No. 40 by Wolfgang Amadeus Mozart
47	19	"Annie and the Beanstalk"	Andy Thom	Abby Miller Pecoriello	Barrett Benica, Kelly Peterson and Geoffrey Johnson	November 10, 2007	224
The team tells a story of a golden goose who sings notes which makes the other geese happy. Then, a forte giant comes down the beanstalk, traps the Golden Goose in a cage, and takes him home into his castle. The Golden Goose sings sadly, as so do the other geese. Now, it is up to the team to free the Golden Goose before the Forte Giant strikes. Art featured: Paintings by Vincent van Gogh Music featured: Symphony No. 5 by Ludwig van Beethoven
48	20	"The Wind-Up Toy Prince"	Andy Thom	Jeff Borkin	Barrett Benica, Kelly Peterson and Geoffrey Johnson	December 7, 2007	227
In Iceland, the team tells a story about a toy prince who helps the other toys in trouble and he can do a funny dance. Then, the Mouse King takes the key from the Toy Prince which causes him to freeze, locking him in the Mouse King's castle. The team manage to find the key hidden under the snow, so it is up to them to bring the key back to the Toy Prince and wind him back up before the Mouse King strikes. Art featured: Little Dancer of Fourteen Years by Edgar Degas Music featured: The Nutcracker Suite by Pyotr Ilyich Tchaikovsky
49	21	"Mr. Penguin's Ice Cream Adventure"	Andy Thom	Brian L. Perkins	Barrett Benica, Kelly Peterson and Geoffrey Johnson	January 28, 2008	221
The team sees a train full of ice cream, which is driven by a Magellanic penguin, who wants to deliver all the ice cream to his best friend's birthday party. However, his train breaks down, so it is up to Rocket and the team to help Mr. Penguin deliver all the ice cream cars before the ice cream melts in the sun. Art featured: VAROOM! by Roy Lichtenstein Music featured: Symphony No. 8: Unfinished Symphony by Franz Schubert
50	22	"Annie, Get Your Microphone"	Andy Thom	Brian L. Perkins	Barrett Benica, Kelly Peterson and Geoffrey Johnson	February 22, 2008	229
The team is in an opera house, where Annie is participating in a singing contest, in which the winner will receive a microphone as the grand prize. Their nemesis Big Jet is there and he wants to win the microphone, so he rips Annie's song into three pieces and throws them far away. Now, it is up to the team to retrieve the three pieces of Annie's song before it is her turn. Art featured: Arboreum by Flashbulb and Report from Rockport by Stuart Davis Music featured: Water Music Suite No. 1 by George Frideric Handel
51	23	"The Treasure Behind the Little Red Door"	Andy Thom	Jessica Lissy	Barrett Benica, Kelly Peterson and Geoffrey Johnson	March 10, 2008 (Note: This episode was first released in Race for Space DVD on February 19, 2008.)	217
The team finds a treasure map and learn that the treasure is behind a little red door located in Hawaii. Then, Big Jet steals the map and it is up to the team to get to the little red door to find the treasure before Big Jet does. Art featured: Hawaiian Tiki Statues Music featured: Funeral March of a Marionette by Charles Francois Gounod
52	24	"The Secret Mystery Prize"	Andy Thom	Jeff Borkin	Barrett Benica, Kelly Peterson and Geoffrey Johnson	April 18, 2008	222
The team is in Japan, wanting to see what the secret mystery prize is in Mount Fuji. They know that they need the musical key to open it, though the key breaks into four pieces. Big Jet hears them and goes to find the four pieces of the key to open the prize. Now, it is up to the team to get the four pieces of the key to become one so that they can unlock the secret mystery prize before Big Jet does. Art featured: Shower Below the Summit by Katsushika Hokusai Music featured: Peer Gynt Suite No. 1 In the Hall of the Mountain King by Edvard Grieg
53	25	"Animal Snack Time"	Andy Thom	Jeff Borkin	Barrett Benica, Kelly Peterson and Geoffrey Johnson	May 2, 2008	235
The team is at the Serengeti National Park in Tanzania, where Rocket is playing with the baby animals. Rocket has three buttons which allows him to transform into three animals: a giraffe, a monkey, and an elephant. When Rocket gives the hungry animals a basket full of animal food, Big Jet steals the basket so that he can eat all of them and it is up to the team to retrieve the treats from Big Jet before he devours them. Art featured: African Pottery Music featured: The Nutcracker Suite by Pyotr Ilyich Tchaikovsky
54	26	"The Great Schubert's Guessing Game"	Andy Thom	Jeff Borkin	Barrett Benica, Kelly Peterson and Geoffrey Johnson	June 21, 2008	230
At a carnival, Annie sees a game called the Great Schubert's guessing game. The game quizzes Annie on which of the four rides in the carnival (bumper cars, merry-go-round, slide, and roller coaster) is the Great Schubert's favorite, and the prize is a stuffed horse which is her favorite animal. The Great Schubert gives Annie three musical clues to know which is the right one, though a gust of wind blows them around the carnival, and it is up to the team to find all three before the game runs out of time. Art featured: Grady Gammage Memorial Auditorium by Frank Lloyd Wright Music featured: Trout Quintet by Franz Schubert
55	27	"Quincy and the Instrument Dinosaurs"	Andy Thom	Brian L. Perkins	Barrett Benica, Kelly Peterson and Geoffrey Johnson	July 19, 2008	226
The team finds dinosaurs which look like instruments. They see a mother Piccolodactyl together with her baby, but they hear a very forte sound coming from a Bassasaurus rex (or B-rex for short), and the sound is so loud and scary, the baby Piccolodactyl flies far away and hides in a log. However, he is unaware that he is hiding near a volcano, so it is up to the team to bring Baby Piccolodactyl back to his mother before the volcano erupts. Art featured: Vesuvius by Andy Warhol Music featured: The Moldau by Bedrich Smetana
56	28	"Build It, Rocket!"	Andy Thom	Jeff Borkin	Barrett Benica, Kelly Peterson and Geoffrey Johnson	August 2, 2008	228
The team watches the Three Little Pigs build their own houses. The first one builds a house full of straw, the second one full of sticks, and the third one is building a brick house. Then, a big bad wolf comes in and blows the first two houses down easily. Now, it is up to the team to find a door, a roof, and bricks for the pigs to build a brick house before the Big Bad Wolf blows it down. Along the way, they must also not let the Big Bad Wolf make their mission harder. Art featured: Haystacks at the End of Summer, Morning Effect by Claude Monet Music featured: Wedding Day at Troldhaugen by Edvard Grieg
57	29	"Melody and Me"	Andy Thom	Story by : Arthur Metcalf; Written by : Jessica Lissy	Barrett Benica, Kelly Peterson and Geoffrey Johnson	September 13, 2008	223
Leo shows his surprise ride to his music pet Melody: a hot air balloon ride, and Leo also sings his song to show that he and Melody will be together forever. Melody is happy to ride in the balloon, though a large gust of wind blows the balloon high in the air, which frightens her. Now, it is up to the team to rescue Melody before the balloon crashes into Cataract Canyon. Art featured: Native American Petroglyphs Music featured: Wedding March by Felix Mendelssohn
58	30	"Music Monsters"	Andy Thom	Jeff Borkin	Barrett Benica, Kelly Peterson and Geoffrey Johnson	October 11, 2008	240
The team reads a story about some music monsters who became sad when they bumped to each other. Annie's favorite music monster is the little red one, because he sings his smile song to make her and the people smile and feel better until the Loch Ness Monster locks them up in a cage. Now, it is up to the team and the Little Red Music Monster to go to the lake to release them from the Loch Ness Monster's cage and make them (and the Loch Ness Monster) happy. Art featured: Glance of a Landscape by Paul Klee Music featured: Piano Concerto No. 21 by Wolfgang Amadeus Mozart
59	31	"The Song of the Unicorn"	Andy Thom	Jeff Borkin	Barrett Benica, Kelly Peterson and Geoffrey Johnson	November 1, 2008	225
The team is at a museum, where they tell a story about a unicorn who is a great conductor. The animals initially do not know how to sing together, until the unicorn waves his baton to help them. Then, a mean queen who is envious of the unicorn puts a spell on him, turning him into a stone statue. The only way to break the spell is to make all the animals sing together, so it is up to the team to save the unicorn before all the leaves from the tree fall or the spell will be permanent. Art featured: The Lady With the Unicorn and other Medieval Tapestries Music featured: 1812 Overture by Pyotr Ilyich Tchaikovsky
60	32	"Flight of the Instrument Fairies"	Andy Thom	Jeff Borkin	Barrett Benica, Kelly Peterson and Geoffrey Johnson	December 13, 2008 (Note: This episode was first released in Flight of the Instrument Fairies DVD on August 5, 2008.)	233
Quincy tells a story about the instrument fairies, which have their own color magic, create beautiful colors, and make the aurora borealis; the trumpet fairy makes blue magic, the oboe fairy makes red magic, the flute fairy makes purple magic, the tuba fairy makes green magic, and the violin fairy makes yellow magic. A big snow storm blows the instrument fairies into a polar bear's cave. However, the Violin Fairy (the smallest one) manages to escape the cave through the key hole, and it is up to the team and the Violin Fairy to head to Lapland and rescue the other instrument fairies before the polar bear arrives. Art featured: Ancient Roman Mosaics Music featured: Violin Concerto in E minor by Felix Mendelssohn
61	33	"Silly Sock Saves the Circus"	Andy Thom	Brian L. Perkins	Barrett Benica, Kelly Peterson and Geoffrey Johnson	January 17, 2009	231
Leo has a silly sock with silly pictures: a pizza, bananas, and a little fish. The sock also sings a silly song which makes his friends laugh. There is going to be a silly clothes circus and the other clothes are to participate in. Silly Sock wants to join in the circus, but they know that it will start today, so it is up to the team to bring Silly Sock to the circus in Paris, France before it starts. Art featured: Mona Lisa by Leonardo da Vinci Music featured: Trout Quintet by Franz Schubert
62	34	"Go Team!"	Andy Thom	Brian L. Perkins	Barrett Benica, Kelly Peterson and Geoffrey Johnson	March 21, 2009	232
The team is in the king's castle showing their special skills, which impresses the king. The king shows them his treasure, though a dragon steals his treasure chest and it is up to the team to work together to retrieve the king's treasure chest from the dragon. Art featured: Architecture and Sculpture by Antoni Gaudi Music featured: The Blue Danube Waltz by Johann Strauss
63	35	"The Music Robot from Outer Space"	Andy Thom	Brian L. Perkins	Barrett Benica, Kelly Peterson and Geoffrey Johnson	May 2, 2009	234
June sees a music robot in outer space from her telescope. A meteor shower heads straight to his home, Planet Robot, so Music Robot sweeps all the rocks, but one of them hits him in the stomach, causing his three flying batteries to fly out. Now, it is up to the team to find Music Robot's three batteries so that he can fly back home. Art featured: Train by Andy Warhol Music featured: Rondeau by Jean-Joseph Mouret
64	36	"Show and Tell"	Andy Thom	Brian L. Perkins	Barrett Benica, Kelly Peterson and Geoffrey Johnson	September 22, 2009 (Note: This episode was first released in The Christmas Wish DVD on October 14, 2008.)	239
The team goes to school, bringing their favorite things for show and tell: Leo has his baton, Annie has her microphone, June has her ballet slippers, and Quincy has his instruments. However, Big Jet steals all their favorite things, and it is up to the team to retrieve them from Big Jet before school starts. Works featured: Mayan architecture Music featured: Carmen Suite No. 1 by Georges Bizet
65	37	"Fire Truck Rocket"	Andy Thom	Jeff Borkin	Barrett Benica, Kelly Peterson and Geoffrey Johnson	November 23, 2009 (Note: This episode was first released in Fire Truck Rocket's Blastoff DVD on September 8, 2009.)	238
The team play as firefighters and Rocket becomes a fire truck. He has three rescue buttons: a ladder, a spreader, and a hose. They notice a big smoke far away which is coming from an erupting volcano in Java, Indonesia. Rocket uses his musical siren to warn all the animals to move clear out of the volcano, but a proboscis monkey gets his tail stuck between two tree branches and is trapped near the volcano. Thus, it will be up to the team to save the proboscis monkey before a volcanic eruption occurs. Note: This was the first show/episode to air on Disney Junior. Art featured: Javanese Shadow Puppets Music featured: 1812 Overture by Pyotr Ilyich Tchaikovsky
66	38	"Rocket the Bug"	Andy Thom	Brian L. Perkins	Barrett Benica, Kelly Peterson and Geoffrey Johnson	November 23, 2009	237
Rocket plays with baby bugs and has bug powers: spider, grub worm, and lightning bug. A rain cloud is coming and Rocket gives the bugs a house to stay dry, but the Big Bad Wolf has a cold and accidentally sneezes the house to New Zealand. Now, it is up to the team to get the house back before the rain cloud reaches the bugs. Art featured: Māori Sculpture Music featured: Water Music Suite No. 1 by George Frideric Handel
67	39	"Little Elephant's Big Parade"	Andy Thom	Jeff Borkin	Barrett Benica, Kelly Peterson and Geoffrey Johnson	December 22, 2009	236
The team is in India, where Leo wins an egg. Inside the egg is a little elephant and there will be an elephant big parade. However, Little Elephant is too small to enter, because she must be at least ten feet tall to enter the parade. For her to grow taller, the team tries to feed her three magic peanuts, though they start magically bouncing away, and it is up to the team to find the three peanuts that are needed to feed Little Elephant before the parade starts. Art featured: Mehndi Designs Music featured: Wedding Day at Troldhaugen by Edvard Grieg

=== Direct-to-video films ===
Title	Directed by	Written by	Storyboard by	Original release date	Prod. code
"Our Huge Adventure"	Olexa Hewryk (creative)	Eric Weiner	Barrett Benica and Bob Cavin III	August 23, 2005	100
The team finds a caterpillar singing on a toadstool. Their new friend attempts to go to the tree of many colors with the other caterpillars on a truck to get a brand new outfit, until the truck hits a bump which throws him off the truck. Now, it is up to the team to bring Little Caterpillar to the tree so that he can get a brand new outfit. Later, the team and their friend Butterfly see that the other butterflies have an invitation to a migration party in Angangueo, Mexico, only to discover that Butterfly does not have his invitation. The mail carrier butterfly says that his invitation is in a mailbox except in the wrong place. Now, it is up to the team to search around the United States to find it. Art featured: A Wheat Field with Cypresses by Vincent van Gogh, Under the Wave off Kanagawa by Katsushika Hokusai, Young Woman in the Garden by Claude Monet, Navajo Woven Art Music featured: Ode to Joy by Ludwig van Beethoven
"Rocket's Firebird Rescue"	Andy Thom (supervising)	Jeff Borkin	Barrett Benica, Kelly Peterson and Geoffrey Johnson	August 21, 2007	214
The team reads a story about a Firebird who makes Russia's music happier. However, the Firebird gets trapped in a cage by an evil ogre named Katschai, causing the happy music in Russia to get quieter. Now, it is up to the team to use their music powers to rescue the Firebird before Katschai strikes. Art featured: Improvisation by Wassily Kandinsky, Matryoshka Nesting Dolls, Fabergé Egg by Peter Carl Fabergé Music featured: Firebird Suite by Igor Stravinsky
