= Our Huge Adventure =

Little Einsteins: Our Huge Adventure
- DVD and VHS cover
- Directed by: Olexa Hewryk
- Written by: Eric Weiner
- Based on: Little Einsteins
- Produced by: Kris Greengrove
- Starring: Natalia Wójcik; Jesse Schwartz; Aiden Pompey; Erica Huang
- Edited by: Kegan Kim
- Music by: Billy Straus
- Production companies: Curious Pictures; The Baby Einstein Company
- Distributed by: Buena Vista Home Entertainment (Note: Under Walt Disney Home Entertainment imprint)
- Release date: August 23, 2005
- Running time: 43 minutes (edited); 61 minutes (unedited)
- Country: United States
- Language: English

Little Einsteins: Our Huge Adventure, also known as Little Einsteins: Our ~~Big~~ Huge Adventure, is a 2005 American live action/animated musical science fantasy adventure film produced by The Baby Einstein Company and Curious Pictures. It was first released direct-to-video on August 23, 2005. The film was followed by and serves as the pilot of the TV series Little Einsteins.

When it later aired on Playhouse Disney, the movie was split in half as two episodes at the end of Little Einsteins' first season, with many scenes of the original cut being edited out or shortened to fit the show's runtime.

As a requirement for the use of the Einstein name and trademark, the Baby Einstein Company paid royalties to Corbis, which acts on behalf of the estate of physicist Albert Einstein ("Einstein" & "Albert Einstein" being licensed trademarks of The Hebrew University of Jerusalem).

Just like the show that followed, Our ~~Big~~ HUGE Adventure was set to famous classical music pieces and artwork. The movie features Beethoven's Ninth Symphony, and includes artwork such as Wheat Field with Cypresses by Vincent van Gogh, The Great Wave off Kanagawa by Katsushika Hokusai, Woman in the Garden by Claude Monet, and Navajo woven art (the last of which also makes a cameo in the series' intro).

== Plot ==
The Little Einsteins are on their daily patrol in Rocket, until they hear music coming from somewhere distant. After following the sound of the music, they reach a large wheat field. Hiding in a toadstool, shrouded in a column of shrubs is a caterpillar. Seemingly enough, the caterpillar is excited, because he is going to change into a Monarch Butterfly at a tree known as the Musical Tree of Many Colors, a tree that harbors caterpillars that are entering their transformation state. Alongside other caterpillars, this caterpillar must go to this aforementioned tree via a green pickup truck. After a few instant, the truck hits a roadblock, causing the caterpillar to fall. The team then offers their help to the caterpillar, giving it a special seat on Rocket. Along the way they must traverse a Musical Roller Coaster, collect yellow leaves to feed the caterpillar along the road, and venture through a dangerous ocean. After reaching the Musical Tree of Many Colors, the caterpillar manages to merge into a grown Monarch Butterfly, much to everyone's delight.

Right after the butterfly's transformation, the team gets 4 invitations to a migration party of a dynasty of Monarch Butterflies in Mexico. Unfortunately, the newly created butterfly's invitation is missing somewhere in a Butterfly Mailbox at 4 locations, much to the team's dismay — but also to the delight of some bullies that did get their invitations and teased the newborn butterfly. Once again, it's up to the quartet to go forth and find the invitation to the party before it begins. After checking a mailbox at Niagara Falls and a garden next to the United Nations in New York City, the team reaches a big cave in Oklahoma which may be a possible lead to the invitation; however, much to everyone's horror, the butterfly wanders off through the cave which is flooded in bats and spiders. After giving chase to a horde of bats, three monarch butterflies are found ensnared inside a spider web, which turns out to be a Great King Spider's dinner. It also turns out that the three butterflies knew the one with the team. The group untangles them and the apex spider gives chase, along with another horde of bloodthirsty bats, but everyone escapes the cave unharmed. The invitation is determined to be at the last spot and found, burrowed within an abandoned mailbox in a field of cows in Houston, Texas. Grateful, the team flies to Mexico for the party. After presenting their invitations, the two other butterflies saved in the cave recognize the team's butterfly, and honor it by giving it a medal for its audacity and the perseverance to strive for its family's wellbeing and legacy. Once again, the day is saved by the heroes, and the butterfly is able to reunite, unharmed and safe with its new family.

== Voice cast ==
- Jesse Schwartz as Leo, a 6-year-old redheaded boy who is Annie's older brother and serves as the group's leader and enjoys conducting.
- Erica Huang as June, a 6-year-old Chinese-American girl in ballerina attire who loves dancing.
- Aiden Pompey as Quincy, a 5-year-old African-American boy who is Leo’s best friend and specializes in playing instruments.
- Natalia Wójcik as Annie, a 4-year-old blonde-haired girl, Leo's younger sister and June’s best friend, with a passion for singing.

=== Singing voices ===
- Harrison Chad
- Jesse Goldberg
- Emma Straus
- Philip Trencher
