= Little Einsteins =

American animated children's television series

- Genre: Children's television series; Educational; Adventure; Musical; Fantasy; Comedy
- Developed by: Douglas Wood (Note: Information about the cast and crew is taken from the closing credits of each episode.)
- Written by: Jeff Borkin (head writer)
- Directed by: Olexa Hewyrk; Andy Thom
- Creative director: Olexa Hewryk (season 1)
- Voices of: Jesse Schwartz; Natalia Wójcik; Aiden Pompey; Erica Huang; Harrison Chad; Jesse Goldberg; Emma Straus; Philip Trencher
- Theme music composer: Billy Straus
- Opening theme: Little Einsteins Theme
- Ending theme: Little Einsteins Theme (instrumental)
- Composers: Billy Straus; Matthias Gohl; Teese Gohl
- Country of origin: United States
- Original language: English
- No. of seasons: 2
- No. of episodes: 67 (list of episodes)

Production
- Executive producers: The Baby Einstein Company: Eric Weiner; Curious Pictures: Susan Holden; Steve Oakes; Richard Winkler
- Producer: Kris Greengrove
- Running time: 24 minutes
- Production companies: Curious Pictures; The Baby Einstein Company

Original release
- Network: Disney Channel (Playhouse Disney)
- Release: October 9, 2005 – December 22, 2009

Little Einsteins is an American live-action/animated children's television series developed by Douglas Wood. Produced by Curious Pictures in association with The Baby Einstein Company, the series follows the adventures of a team of four young children: Leo, June, Quincy, and Annie. Together, they travel around the world in Rocket, a sentient red rocket ship, and undertake various missions, with the goal of solving a problem, helping someone, or finding something. Every episode features a specific art piece and a composition of classical music.

Little Einsteins was developed after The Walt Disney Company acquired The Baby Einstein Company. Extensive research was done to ensure the series was appealing to preschoolers. Production of each episode was located at Manhattan, New York. Little Einsteins started with a direct-to-video film Our Huge Adventure; it was released on August 23, 2005. The series later premiered on October 9 on Disney Channel's programming block Playhouse Disney. It was concluded on December 22, 2009, after two seasons and 67 episodes.

Critics opined that Little Einsteins introduced children to classical music and art without lowering levels of intelligence. Several reviews lauded the quality of music, animation, and visuals; others deemed the series educational, well-crafted, and valuable to children. Little Einsteins received high viewership and influenced the development of merchandise, video games, and others. It was nominated for two Daytime Emmy Awards for Outstanding Children's Animated Program in 2008 and 2009. The album Disney's Little Einsteins Musical Missions also received a nomination for Best Spoken Word Album for Children at the 49th Annual Grammy Awards.

== Overview ==
The five main characters of the series. From top to bottom: Leo, June, Quincy, Annie (in her appearance from the first season), and Rocket

The curriculum of Little Einsteins primarily focuses on teaching art and music appreciation. In each episode, a famous or culturally significant work of art will be integrated within the plotline. These are most often in the form of paintings, but other artistic mediums (such as sculptures) have been featured occasionally. The artwork featured is frequently connected to a specific culture or part of the world, and special episodes will have more than one piece showcased.

In addition, much like the original Baby Einstein videos, every episode centers on a select composition of music (typically from the Baroque, Classical, and Romantic eras) that will play multiple times throughout the episode and likewise affect the plot. The show also promotes recognizing different kinds of musical instruments, notation, and terminology.

The show is also designed to encourage viewer participation. Over the course of an episode, the Little Einsteins will regularly interact with the audience and require their assistance at several points throughout their journey. The characters will also prompt the audience to perform specific actions that include patting their laps, identifying objects, solving puzzles, and singing or dancing along to help them overcome obstacles and complete their mission.

== Episodes ==
Season	Episodes	Originally released	
Season	Episodes	First released	Last released
1	28	October 9, 2005	November 20, 2006
2	39	January 13, 2007	December 22, 2009

=== Home video and streaming ===
After the direct-to-video film Our Huge Adventure, Little Einsteins had several DVD releases. In 2006, Little Einsteins became available to purchase on iTunes. The show is available on Disney+.

== Production ==
=== Background ===
In March 2001, a licensing agreement between The Baby Einstein Company and The Walt Disney Company was announced, allowing Disney to develop Baby Einstein products. On November 6, 2001, a Disney press release announced that it acquired The Baby Einstein Company after two years of pursuit. Robert Iger, Disney's president and chief operating officer from 2000 to 2005, stated that there were plans to extend the Baby Einstein brand into a Little Einstein product line aimed at preschoolers, initially set to launch in late 2002.

=== Development ===
According to Disney Channel's then-senior vice president Nancy Kanter, the series was started "from scratch" since the Baby Einstein entries had no specific story lines and characters. Extensive research was done to produce an episode of the series. Executive producer Eric Weiner and Kanter developed the Book-a-Matic, an electronic storyboard, for research of the series. The production was located at Manhattan, New York, with each episode shipped to the headquarters of Disney Channel in California. Approximately 100 employees worked on the series, taking up to nine months for an episode to be completed, with six to ten episodes being in production at the same time.

=== Conception, writing, storyboards, and testing ===
The series' concept originated in several schools located at Manhattan, where Weiner and the production team interviewed children that if they could go anywhere in the world, where would it be. The most popular answer was "One Dollar Store"; the second most popular answer was New Jersey. Their answers inspired them to create the concept of travel since they wanted to "open them up to wider possibilities."

Jeff Borkin, the head writer for the series, did not model the characters after anyone, but created a balanced dynamic within the group of friends by adding individual traits. Leo and Annie were developed to become siblings, while Quincy was developed to become the comedian of the group as a way to ease possible tension.

The plot for an episode was written first. After the storyboards of each episode were finished, music, artwork, and backgrounds were chosen to accompany an episode. Dialogue was later added in storyboard panels. Because classical music was used to accompany the animation, writing had to be tweaked and honed to match the music. To ensure an episode appealed to children under five, many writers read stories to a group of preschoolers to monitor their reactions. Storyboard forms and rough-cut versions of each episode were also tested on children from elementary schools and nurseries in New York City. Only episodes praised by children were completed.

=== Animation ===
The producers of the series wanted the series to be "seamless" with a combination of live-action footage and animation. Testing with different textures, images of animals, nature, well-known locations, and several others were added to create a combination of 2D, 3D, and computer animation by using Alias Maya, LightWave 3D, Corel Painter, Adobe Photoshop, Adobe Flash, and Adobe After Effects. Animators use drop shades to create an illusion of depth of the characters against the backgrounds. Twelve animators animated each 22-minute episode of the series at Curious Pictures. After animation of a scene was finished, the music score required post-production work to synchronize the animation.

=== Music and sound effects ===
After the creative team of Playhouse Disney found out that parents expected a show to be "older-skewing", child development expert Dr. Valeria Lovelace suggested that the series should include classical music during their first meeting about the series. The team also learned that parents liked classical music being an integral part of the projects. To test children's reaction to music, they visited a preschool for kids from low-income families in New York City. Playing Johann Sebastian Bach's Brandenberg Concerto No. 5, it was shown that they stopped what they were doing and danced to it. After Weiner conducted focus groups at 100 preschools, he discovered that children could still understand Little Einsteins without music training.

The goal for the series was to "use the music not in a preachy way, but in an organic way to tell the story and inspire the viewers." Each classical music piece was tested to preschoolers before they were assigned to the series. The series' music consultant, Cordelia Bergamo, selected 50 classical music pieces for research. Bergamo prepared two audiotapes for each classical piece to detail which parts may resonate with children. After consulting with the producers, the list was trimmed to thirteen classical pieces. Rough-cut versions of the episodes were tested on children aged three to five throughout New York City, northern New Jersey, and Westchester County, New York. After they viewed the series, children were interviewed individually based on how they liked the music. The top-ten list was later generated based on children's ratings on their preferences of the music used in the tests.

Written by Billy Straus, the theme song "Little Einsteins Theme" was sung by Harrison Chad, Jesse Goldberg, Emma Straus, and Philip Trencher. After the animation for an episode was completely finished, sound designer Lou Esposito picked sound effects and added each one into a 64-track recording at his vault. For a few days before the final mix of each episode, audio engineer Ryan Heiferman mixed and balanced the dialogue, music, and sound effects in Pomann Sound.

== Release and broadcast ==
On February 10, 2003, Little Einsteins was slated to debut worldwide on Disney Channel in 2004. On February 9, 2004, it was announced that Little Einsteins was rescheduled to debut in the first half of 2005. In November 2004, Disney Channel ordered 26 episodes of Little Einsteins. Former Disney Branded Television president Gary Marsh announced that Disney Channel ordered a second season in February 2006. To market the series, Disney added sneak peeks onto Baby Einstein home video releases and a clip for the theatrical release of Pooh's Heffalump Movie, which was released in February 2005.

Little Einsteins debuted with the direct-to-video release Our Huge Adventure. It was released on August 23, 2005, on DVD and VHS. Our Huge Adventure quickly became a best-seller on DVD, becoming the number one preschool DVD franchise of 2005. As of February 2006, it sold approximately 500,000 units, earning $11 million. The first regular episode of Little Einsteins premiered as a primetime special on October 9, 2005, on Disney Channel, as part of the Playhouse Disney block in the United States. A special titled "Rocket's Firebird Rescue" was released direct-to-video on August 21, 2007. The final episode "Little Elephant's Big Parade" aired on December 22, 2009. The series continued to air in reruns afterward, including after Playhouse Disney was rebranded as Disney Junior on February 14, 2011, through March 18, 2019. In 2006, Little Einsteins began to premiere internationally, airing in 72 countries across the world as of 2008. In Canada, Little Einsteins premiered as a primetime special on February 11, 2006, on Family Channel.

== Reception ==
=== Critical response ===
Little Einsteins was generally praised by critics. Most critics praised its exposure of classical music and art. Andrew Druckenbrod of Pittsburgh Post-Gazette, Pam Gelman of Common Sense Media, Sharon McDaniel of Cox News Service, and Jeanne Spreler of The Dallas Morning News were impressed about the series' ability to teach children about classical music and art without lowering levels of intelligence. Azlina Ali of Sunday Mail and Peter Dobrin of The Philadelphia Inquirer lauded the presentation, basis, and emphasis of classical music. Ali, Druckenbrod, and Gelman highlighted and remarked the attachment of art masterpieces and music compositions added into each story. McDaniel opined that Little Einsteins "might be the best introduction to the fine arts on television." In comparison, MCT News Service's Louis R. Carlozo found the method of exposing children to fine arts and racial diversity "ham-fisted".

The quality of the animation, music, and visuals was generally lauded by critics. Several critics, such as Sharon Galligar Chance of Times Record News and Spreler, praised the quality of music used in the series. Ali, Carlozo, Chance, Diana Dawson of ZapZit, and McDaniel praised the animation and visuals, including the combination of 2D characters set in a realistic setting among well-known paintings, realistic shots of nature, and global settings. In less complimentary reviews, Druckenbrod praised the music used in the series, but stated that the lyrics attached to classical music were silly. A review published in Billings Gazette commented "Little Einsteins have just ruined about every piece of classical music that has ever written."

Other reviewers focused on Little Einsteins' content, including its use of characters and educational values. Upon its debut, Chicago Tribune's Maureen Ryan and Sid Smith welcomed the series as a "charming addition to the growing roster of shows for preschoolers." Many critics, such as Dobrin, Druckenbrod, Ryan, and Smith, deemed the series educational, well-crafted, and valuable. Gelman remarked that the series "[was] a refreshing change from today's cartoons." Patrick Douglas of Great Falls Tribune, Druckenbrod, and Glenn McDonald of The News & Observer commended the series as fun for children. Carlozo reviewed that although the content lacked "the edge of SpongeBob SquarePants," it was enough to engage children. While Ali, Roger Catlin of Hartford Courant, Nancy Churnin of The Dallas Morning News, and Gelman lauded the characters as cute, likable, and wholesome, Billings Gazette said that the characters were "none too bright", highlighting Annie as the "annoying little blonde [girl]." Catlin described the series as "kind of charming", but found the "little silences in which the characters pause to hear the answers" embarrassing, deeming it similar to Dora the Explorer.

=== Television ratings ===
When Little Einsteins premiered on Playhouse Disney in the United States, it received 2.4 million viewers, including 737,000 children aged two to five. The series' premiere earned a 5.6 Nielsen rating and received records for the highest-rated premiere among children, boys, and girls aged two to five on television programs airing on October 9, 2005, the highest-rated premiere for children aged two to five on Playhouse Disney, and the highest-rated primetime event for children aged two to five on Playhouse Disney in five years.

After the premiere, the series received the highest ratings for a preschool television show on Playhouse Disney at the time. The series earned a 4.3 Nielsen rating, totaling 519,000 viewers aged two to five on average; it became the highest-rated television show for children aged two to five at the time slot of 8:00 a.m. (EST/PST). As of 2006, it became the highest-rated series for children aged two to five on Disney Channel. In February, viewership of children aged two to five increased by 18 percent from the previous year, totaling 561,000 children of the age group. In the United Kingdom, the series received 1.8 million viewers regularly.

=== Accolades ===
Year	Award	Category	Result	Ref.
2008	35th Annie Awards	Best Animated Television Production for Children	Nominated	
2008	35th Daytime Emmy Awards	Outstanding Children's Animated Program	Nominated	
2008	Online Film & Television Association Awards	Best Children's Program	Nominated	
2009	36th Daytime Emmy Awards	Outstanding Children's Animated Program	Nominated	

== Other media ==
=== Merchandising and products ===
Several merchandise and products were released throughout the run of the series. In 2007, Disney signed an exclusive deal with Target to release exclusive Little Einsteins merchandise at Target stores. Merchandise rolled out in July 2007 with toys, games, books, and other products. It also released new products during a "back-to-school" season. The merchandise received remarkably high sales at Target stores. In 2008, Disney Stores released Little Einsteins plush toys of maracas, violins, and bongos. In 2009, Cardinal Industries released a game tie-in featuring Little Einsteins.

Tie-ins of food and drinks were also released. In 2007, Disney Consumer Products and General Mills released the cereal Little Einsteins Fruity Stars. In April 2008, Disney Consumer Products and Stremicks Heritage Foods released milk featuring Little Einsteins.

=== Live events ===
In late August 2007, Feld Entertainment started a live tour Playhouse Disney Live, featuring Little Einsteins. Starting in May 2008, the characters appeared as puppets in the live show Playhouse Disney – Live on Stage!, held at Disney's Hollywood Studios in Walt Disney World and Disney California Adventure in Disneyland. In 2011, the live show was updated to Disney Junior–Live at Stage!. The show's segment remained in the show until 2013, when it was replaced by Doc McStuffins.

=== Theme park appearances ===
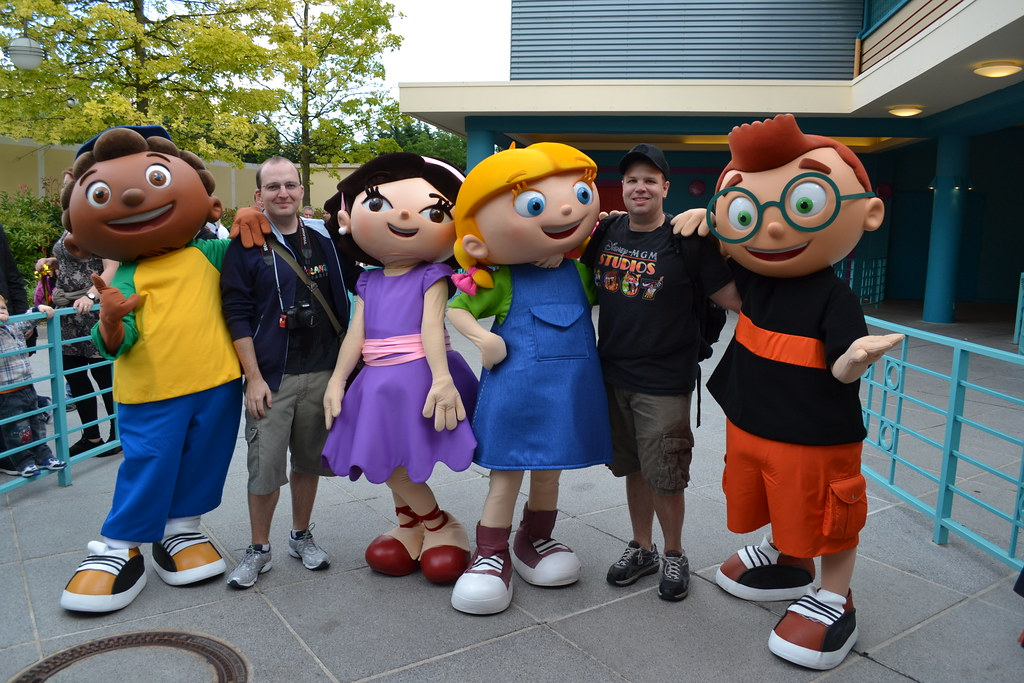
The series' titular protagonists taking a photo with a pair of visitors at a Disney theme park in 2011

Annie, June, Leo, and Quincy were formerly meet-and-greet characters at Animation Courtyard in Disneyland Paris. As of 2009, Leo and June appeared at the buffet in Hollywood & Vine. Although Leo stopped appearing at the buffet as of 2012 (and the characters phased out of the parks entirely by 2013), June continued to appear in Hollywood & Vine until 2015.

=== Video games ===
A video game based on the series was released on the Game Boy Advance in September 2006. The video game featured seven multi-level missions, 21 games with classic pieces of art and music, and six modes of game play. Other Little Einsteins video games were released for the V.Smile and Zippity in 2009.

== Legacy ==
On January 2, 2006, Little Einsteins appeared as a giant float made of flowers, seeds, bark, leaves, and other natural materials at the 117th Annual Tournament of Roses Parade in Pasadena, California.

In 2014, a YouTube user uploaded a trap remix of the show's theme song on YouTube. The remix gained popularity in February 2015, inspiring people to upload Vine videos of celebrity mismatches and children dancing in pajamas.
