= Harrison Chad =

American actor (born 1992)

- Born: July 17, 1992 (age 34); New York City, New York, U.S.
- Occupation: Actor
- Years active: 1998–present
- Known for: Original voice of Boots the Monkey
- Children: 1

Harrison Chad (born July 17, 1992) is an American actor known for his roles in Broadway musicals, television, and film.

== Early life and education ==
Harrison was born in New York City and started performing when he was six years old. He has performed in four Broadway shows: Peter Pan, Beauty and the Beast, Les Miserables, and he starred opposite Tonya Pinkins in Caroline, or Change. He graduated from Brown University in 2014.

== Career ==
His roles include young Tarzan in the film Tarzan 2, the original voice for Boots the Monkey on Dora the Explorer for the first four seasons from 2000–2007 and Go, Diego, Go!, the singing voice of Leo on Little Einsteins (2005–2009), and Cardigan from Charlotte's Web 2: Wilbur's Great Adventure. He also has performed live-action roles, including as the Comedy Central film The Hebrew Hammer and the Showtime film Carry Me Home. He has guest starred on television, in Ed, Smash, Blue Bloods, Divorce, and Murphy Brown.

He received a 2004 Young Artist Awards nomination for his role as Boots, in the category "Best Performance in a Voice-Over Role – Young Actor".

He then went on to perform in the Kennedy Center production of Mame performing opposite Christine Baranski in 2006.

In 2013, he was in the Joe Iconis musical, The Black Suits at Center Theatre Group in Los Angeles. He also appeared in the workshop of The Black Suits at the Barrington Stage Company in 2012.

== Filmography ==
=== Film ===
Year	Title	Role	Notes
2003	The Hebrew Hammer	Schlomo	
2003	Charlotte's Web 2: Wilbur's Great Adventure	Cardigan (voice)	Direct-to-video
2004	Messengers	Michael Richards	
2005	Tarzan II	Tarzan (voice)	Direct-to-video
2006	Nick Jr. Favorites Holiday	Boots (voice)	Direct-to-video
2006	Wrestling with Angels: Playwright Tony Kushner	—N/a	Documentary
2007	ShowBusiness: The Road to Broadway	—N/a	Documentary
2005	Dora the Explorer: It's a Party	Boots (voice)	Direct-to-video
2013	Jack, Jules, Esther and Me	Dougie	Direct-to-video
2018	Hearts Beat Loud	Jake	Uncredited

=== Television ===
Year	Title	Role	Notes
2000–2007	Dora the Explorer	Boots / Squirrel Chorus (voices)	103 episodes
2002	Ed	Ryan Parker	Episode: "Youth Bandits"
2003	As the World Turns	Fantasy Boy #2	Episode dated 22 May 2003
2004	Carry Me Home	Brian	Television film
2005–2007	Go, Diego, Go!	Boots / Animal SFX (voices)	2 episodes
2005–2009	Little Einsteins	Leo (singing voice)	
2012	Smash	August	Episode: "Understudy"
2017	Blue Bloods	Evan Fleming	Episode: "The Thin Blue Line"
2018	Saturday Night Live	Dancer	Episode: "Will Ferrell/Chris Stapleton"
2018	Divorce	Ice Rink Guard	Episode: "Breaking the Ice"
2018	Murphy Brown	Connor	Episode: "The Coma and the Oxford Comma"
2018	Moosebox	Arms / Police Chip 1	Episode: "Arcade Claw"
2020	Little America	Tom	Episode: "The Cowboy"
2020	Little Voice	Frat Boy	Episode: "Tell Her"

=== Video games ===
Year	Title	Role
2003	Disney's Extreme Skate Adventure	Young Tarzan
2003	Dora the Explorer: Barnyard Buddies	Boots
2005	Dora the Explorer: Journey to the Purple Planet	Boots / Tito the Turtle
2006	The Sopranos: Road to Respect	—N/a
2009	Grand Theft Auto: The Ballad of Gay Tony	Bobby Blue
