= Wheat Field with Cypresses =

Paintings by Vincent van Gogh

A Wheatfield with Cypresses (New York)
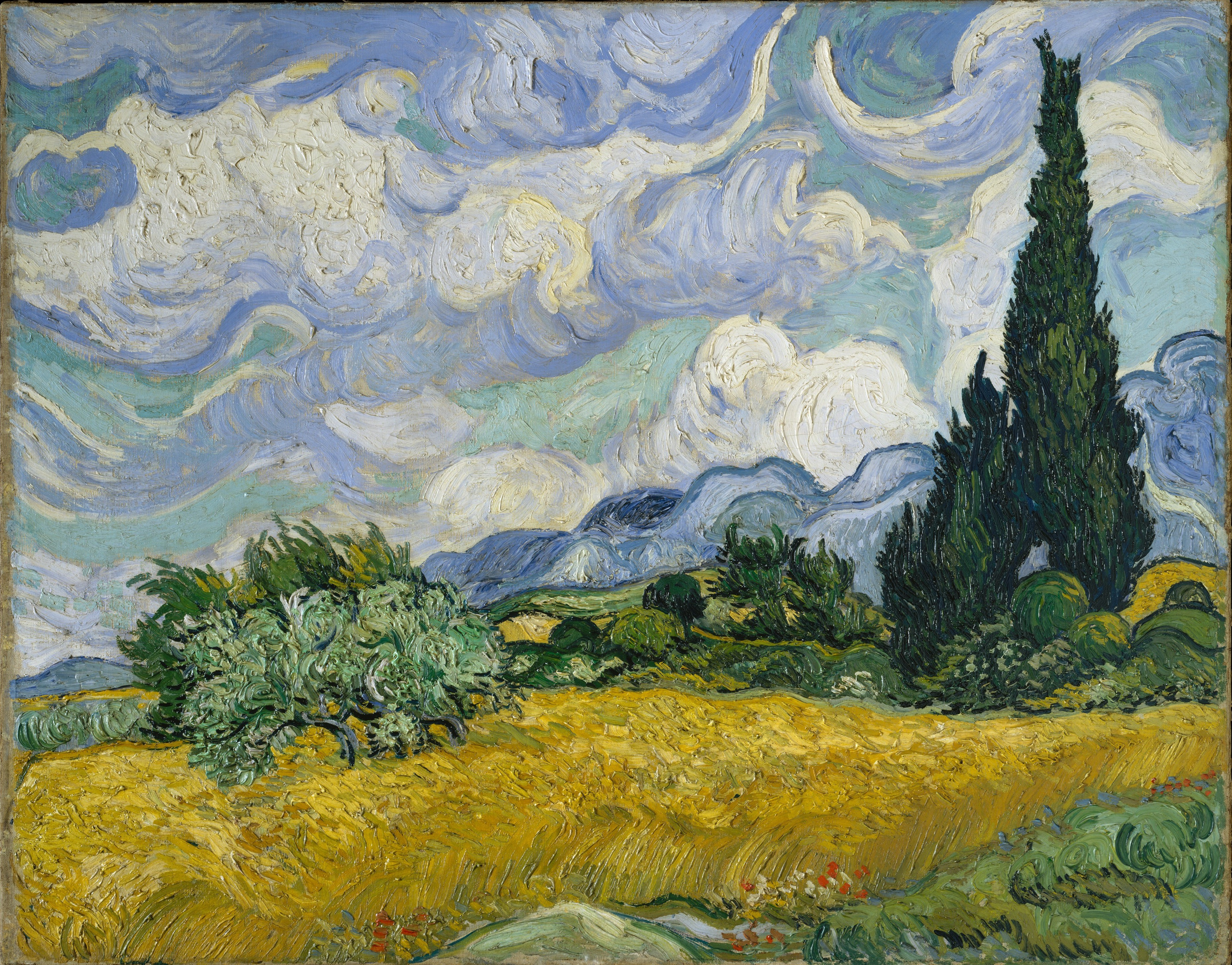
- Artist: Vincent van Gogh
- Year: July 1889
- Catalogue: F717; JH1756
- Medium: Oil on canvas
- Dimensions: 73 cm × 93.4 cm (29 in × 36.8 in)
- Location: Metropolitan Museum of Art; New York City

A Wheatfield with Cypresses (London)
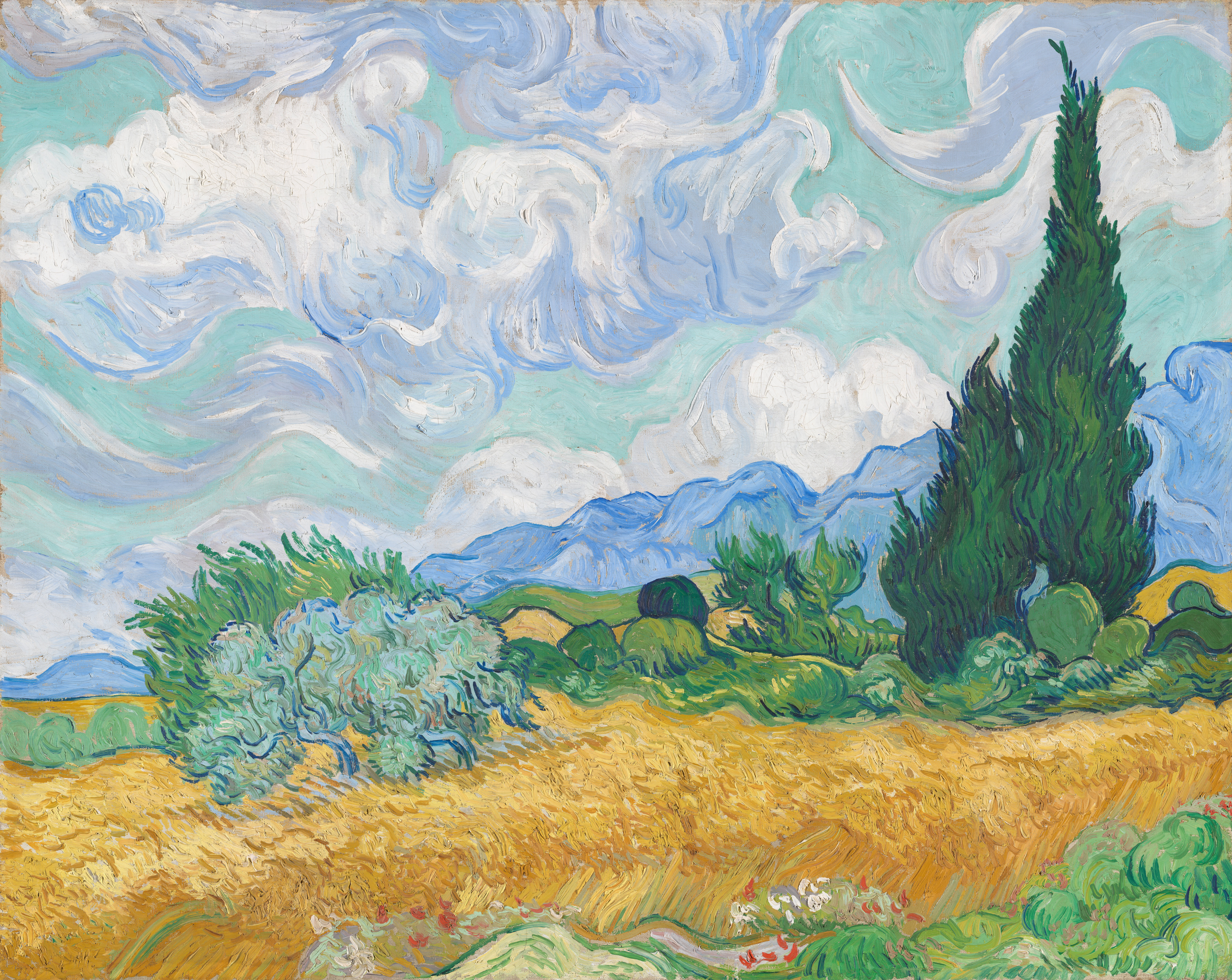
- Artist: Vincent van Gogh
- Year: September 1889
- Catalogue: F615; JH1755
- Medium: Oil on canvas
- Dimensions: 72.1 cm × 90.9 cm (28.4 in × 35.8 in)
- Location: National Gallery; London

A Wheatfield with Cypresses (Smaller Version)
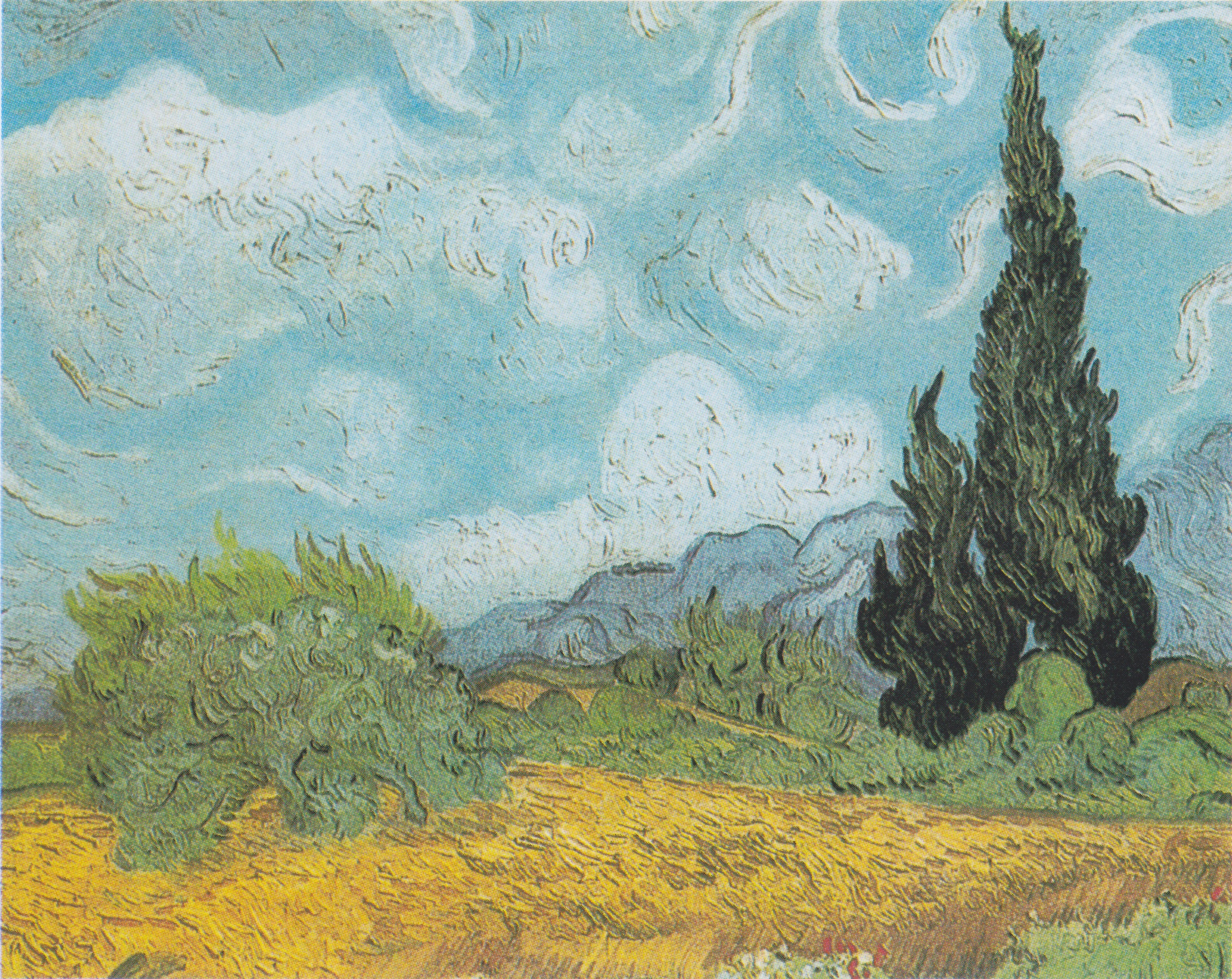
- Artist: Vincent van Gogh
- Year: September 1889
- Catalogue: F743
- Medium: Oil on canvas
- Dimensions: 51.5 cm × 65 cm (20.3 in × 26 in)
- Owner: Private Collection

A Wheatfield with Cypresses is the title of three similar 1889 oil paintings by Vincent van Gogh, as part of his Wheat Fields series. All were exhibited at the Saint-Paul-de-Mausole mental asylum in Saint-Rémy near Arles, France, where Van Gogh was voluntarily a patient from May 1889 to May 1890. The works were inspired by the view from the window at the asylum towards the Alpilles mountains.

== Description ==
The painting depicts golden fields of ripe wheat, a dark fastigiate Provençal cypress towering like a green obelisk to the right and lighter green olive trees in the middle distance, with hills and mountains visible behind, and white clouds swirling in an azure sky above. The first version (F717) was painted in late June or early July 1889, during a period of frantic painting and shortly after Van Gogh completed The Starry Night, at a time when he was fascinated by the cypress. It is likely to have been painted "en plein air", near the subject, when Van Gogh was able to leave the precincts of the asylum. Van Gogh regarded this work as one of his best summer paintings. In a letter to his brother, Theo, written on 2 July 1889, Vincent described the painting: "I have a canvas of cypresses with some ears of wheat, some poppies, a blue sky like a piece of Scotch plaid; the former painted with a thick impasto like the Monticelli's, and the wheat field in the sun, which represents the extreme heat, very thick too."

Van Gogh had to take time off painting in order to deal with some severe problems due to mental illness in late July and early August, but was able to resume painting in late August and early September 1889. After making a reed-pen drawing of the work, now held by the Van Gogh Museum in Amsterdam, he copied the composition twice in oils in his studio, one approximately the same size (F615) and a smaller version (F743). The larger studio version was probably painted in a single sitting, with a few minor later adjustments adding touches of yellow and brown. Van Gogh sketched out the design with charcoal underdrawing; he applied thin paint on the cypress trees and sky, with the ground allowed to show in places, and thick impasto for the foreground wheat and the clouds above. Characteristically, he preferred the brilliant white of zinc white (zinc oxide) for the white clouds rather than lead white, despite its poor drying qualities, with his palette also including cobalt blue for the sky, shades of chrome yellow for the wheat field, viridian and emerald green for the bushes and cypresses, and touches of vermilion for the poppies in the foreground and also synthetic ultramarine. The July "plein air" version was much more heavily worked, and may be considered a study for the more considered September studio painting. He sent the smaller and less accomplished studio version to his mother and sister as a gift.

Vincent sent the larger July and September versions to his brother in Paris later in September 1889. The July version was sold by Theo's widow in 1900 to artist Émile Schuffenecker. It passed through the hands of collector Alexandre Berthier and art dealer Paul Cassirer in Paris, where it was first exhibited and photographed at Galerie Eugène Druet in November 1909. It was sold to banker Franz von Mendelssohn (1865–1935) in Berlin in 1910 and remained with the Mendelssohn family in Germany and Switzerland until it was sold to industrialist Emil Bührle in Zurich in 1952. His son, Dieter Bührle, bought the painting in 1993, and subsequently donated it to the Metropolitan Museum of Art in New York, for $57 million using funds donated by publisher, diplomat and philanthropist Walter Annenberg.

The National Gallery in London holds a similar version painted in Van Gogh's studio in September 1889, bought with the Courtauld Fund in 1923. It is unlined, and was never varnished or waxed.

The third smaller version is held by a private collection (sold at Sotheby's in London in 1970; in the US in 1987).

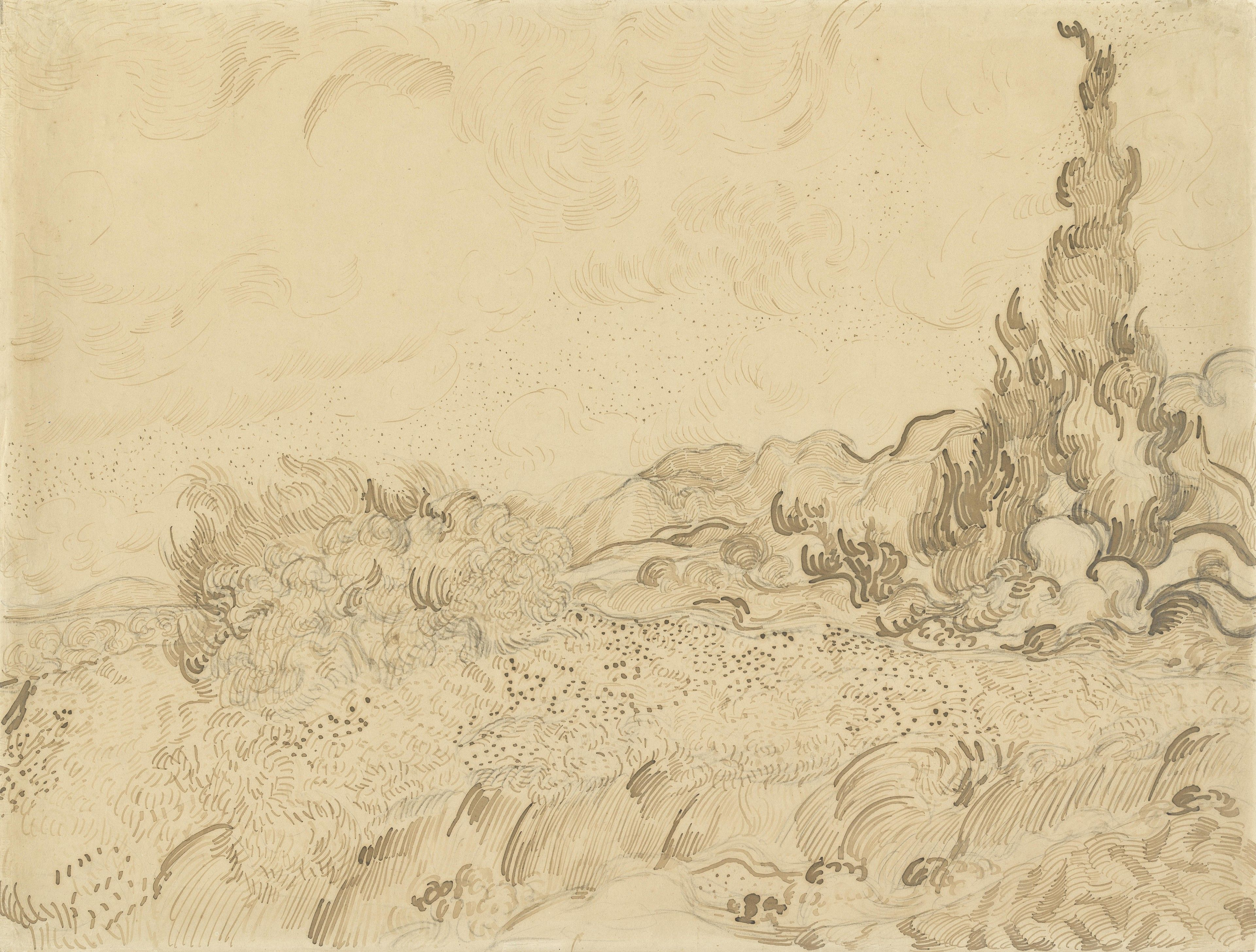
Reed-pen drawing, held by the Van Gogh Museum in Amsterdam (F1538)

== See also ==
- List of most expensive paintings
- List of works by Vincent van Gogh
