= Woman in the Garden =

1866/7 painting by Claude Monet

- Jeanne-Marguerite Lecadre in the Garden
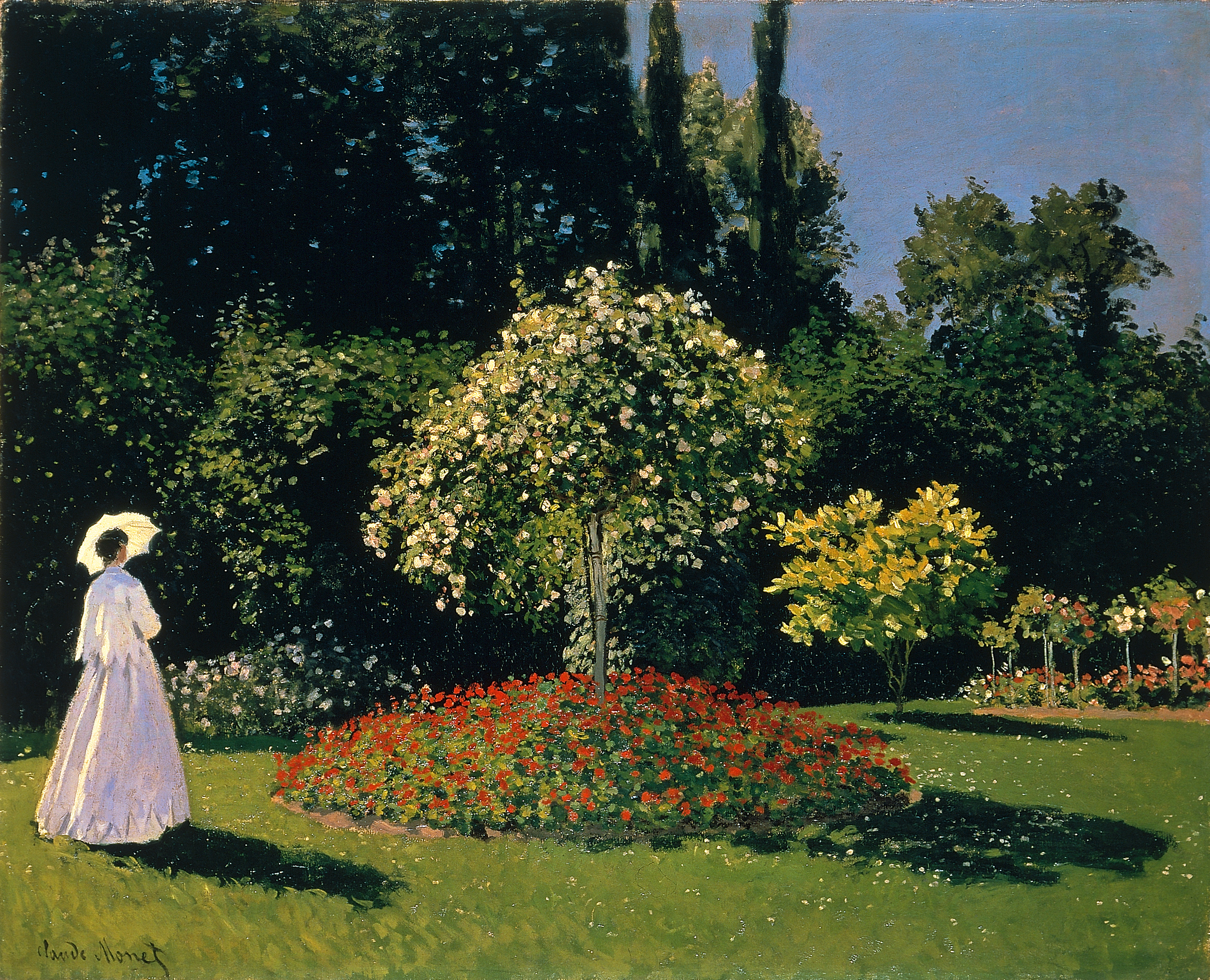
- Artist: Claude Monet
- Year: 1867
- Medium: oil paint, canvas
- Movement: Impressionism
- Dimensions: 82 cm (32 in) × 101 cm (40 in)
- Location: Hermitage Museum, Russia
- Accession: ГЭ-6505

Woman in the Garden (French: Femme au jardin) (or Jeanne-Marguerite Lecadre in the Garden) is a painting begun in 1866 by Claude Monet when he was a young man of 26. The work was executed en plein air in oil on canvas with a relatively large size of 82 by 101 cm. and currently belongs in the collection of the Hermitage Museum in St Petersburg, Russia.

The woman in the painting is Jeanne-Marguerite Lecadre, the young wife of his well-to-do cousin Paul-Eugene Lecadre. The Lecadres lived at Le Havre and had a country house, Le Coteau, in nearby Sainte-Adresse, in the garden of which the painting was made during a short visit. X-ray analysis has revealed that it was actually painted over a previous picture.

The style of the painting is quite composed and detailed, unlike the typically impressionist works for which Monet was later acclaimed. Three principal objects, Jeanne-Marguerite, the central flowering rose bush in the bed of bright red flowers and the flowering bush on the right provide an ordered structure and Jeanne-Marguerite's bright white dress contrasts vividly with the reds, pinks and greens of the garden plants and trees. The subject matter foreshadowed Monet's lifelong passion for painting flowers and gardens in a natural setting.

== See also ==
- List of paintings by Claude Monet
