= List of early music ensembles =

An early music ensemble is a musical ensemble that specializes in performing early music of the European classical tradition from the Baroque era and earlier – broadly, music produced before about 1750. Most, but not all, of these groups are advocates of historically informed performance, and attempt to re-create the music as it might have sounded at the time it was written, using period instruments and modifying playing techniques according to the most recent scholarly research into music of the time.

Names in parentheses below indicate current directors, unless otherwise indicated.

== List of ensembles ==
=== Australia ===
- Australian Brandenburg Orchestra (Paul Dyer), Sydney: baroque orchestra
- Australian Haydn Ensemble (Skye McIntosh): 18th century period orchestra
- Australian Romantic & Classical Orchestra (Rachael Beesley and Nicole Van Bruggen): 18th-20th century period orchestra
- Bach Akademie Australia (Madeleine Easton) Sydney-based historically informed baroque ensemble, specialising in the music of J. S. Bach and contemporaries.
- Canberra Bach Ensemble, Andrew Koll: baroque ensemble and chamber choir
- Ensemble Gombert, Melbourne: chamber choir

=== Austria ===
- Ars Antiqua Austria
- Cinquecento: vocal ensemble
- Clemencic Consort (René Clemencic): medieval to baroque
- Concentus Musicus Wien (Nikolaus Harnoncourt), Vienna: baroque orchestra
- Ensemble Eduard Melkus (Capella Academica Wien), Vienna: defunct
- Fiori Musicali Austria, Vienna: baroque chamber group
- Quadriga Consort: emphasis on early British traditional and popular music
- Quatuor Mosaïques (founded in 1985 by members of Concentus Musicus Wien), Vienna

=== Belgium ===
- Capilla Flamenca (Dirk Snellings): Renaissance choral
- Les Agrémens
- Collegium Vocale Gent (Philippe Herreweghe): Renaissance and baroque choir
- Currende (Erik Van Nevel): Renaissance choir
- Ensemble Clematis, Leonardo García-Alarcón: baroque
- Huelgas Ensemble (Paul Van Nevel): Renaissance choir
- Les Muffatti, Brussels: Baroque orchestra
- La Petite Bande (Sigiswald Kuijken): baroque orchestra and chamber ensemble
- Ricercar Consort: baroque cantatas
- Vox Luminis: 16th- to 18th-century Italian, German, and English vocal music
- il Gardellino: 16th- to early 19th-century repertoire: orchestra and vocal ensemble

=== Canada ===
- Académie Baroque de Montréal (Suzie LeBlanc)
- Arion Orchestre Baroque, Montréal
- Early Music Vancouver (EMV), Vancouver: early music concert series
- Ensemble Caprice (Matthias Maute), Montréal
- Ensemble Claude-Gervaise, Montréal
- Nota Bene Players & Singers (Howard Dyck). Waterloo, ON:early music orchestra and chamber choir
- Opera Atelier, Toronto: baroque opera company
- The Pacific Baroque Orchestra, Vancouver
- Studio de musique ancienne de Montréal: mostly music of the Renaissance and early baroque
- Tafelmusik Baroque Orchestra, Toronto: baroque orchestra and chamber choir
- Theatre of Early Music (Daniel Taylor), Toronto: chamber choir
- Victoria Baroque, Victoria, BC: early music ensemble
- Les Violons du Roy (Jonathan Cohen), Québec City: early music orchestra

=== Colombia ===
- Musica Ficta (Carlos Serrano): Bogota: Latin American baroque

=== Czech Republic ===
- Collegium 1704 (Václav Luks): Prague: early music ensemble
- Collegium 419: Prague: early music vocal ensemble
- Collegium Marianum (Jana Semerádová): Prague: early music ensemble
- Musica Florea (Marek Štryncl): Prague: early music ensemble
- Schola Gregoriana Pragensis: Prague: a cappella male choir whose core repertoire is Gregorian chant, Bohemian plainchant, and early polyphony
- Czech Ensemble Baroque - Roman Válek, Tereza Válková, Loučka: early music ensemble
- Ensemble Inegal Prague: Adam Viktora, Prague

=== Denmark ===
- Ars Nova Copenhagen (Paul Hillier): Renaissance to contemporary
- Concerto Copenhagen (Lars Ulrik Mortensen): baroque orchestra
- Camerata Øresund
- Musica Ficta (Bo Holten): Renaissance and contemporary choral
- Ensemble Zimmermann (Lars Colding Wolf): Mixed early music ensemble

=== Estonia ===
- Hortus Musicus (Andres Mustonen): medieval and Renaissance and baroque and contemporary music
- Rondellus: medieval and Renaissance and contemporary music

=== Finland ===
- Kuninkaantien muusikot – Musicians of the King's Road: baroque orchestra and choir
- Oliphant: medieval music

=== France ===
- L'Arpeggiata (Christina Pluhar): early baroque
- Les Arts Florissants (William Christie): baroque orchestra
- Boulanger Ensemble (Nadia Boulanger): historic revival of Monteverdi
- Capriccio Stravagante (Skip Sempé): baroque chamber music
- Les Siècles (François-Xavier Roth): symphony orchestra
- La Chapelle Rhénane (Benoît Haller): baroque orchestra
- La Chapelle Royale (Philippe Herreweghe): baroque orchestra
- Chœur de Chambre Accentus (Laurence Equilbey): Renaissance to contemporary choir
- Le Concert d'Astrée (Emmanuelle Haïm): baroque orchestra
- Le Concert Spirituel (Hervé Niquet): baroque orchestra
- Concerto Vocale (René Jacobs): baroque vocal
- Diabolus in Musica, Paris: medieval choral
- Ensemble 415 (Chiara Banchini): baroque chamber orchestra
- Ensemble baroque de Nice (Gilbert Bezzina): baroque opera
- Ensemble Clément Janequin (Dominique Visse): Renaissance chansons
- Ensemble Matheus (Jean-Christophe Spinosi): baroque orchestra
- Ensemble Organum (Marcel Pérès): Gregorian chant
- La Grande Écurie et la Chambre du Roy (Jean-Claude Malgoire)
- Les Musiciens de Saint-Julien: baroque orchestra, François Lazarevitch
- Les Musiciens du Louvre (Marc Minkowski), Grenoble: baroque orchestra
- Orchestre Les Passions
- Le Poème Harmonique (Vincent Dumestre): Renaissance-baroque chamber group
- Les Talens Lyriques (Christophe Rousset): baroque opera and orchestra

=== Germany ===
- Akademie für Alte Musik Berlin: baroque orchestra
- Pera Ensemble: baroque orchestra, Alla Turca
- Cantus Cölln (Konrad Junghänel): Renaissance and baroque vocal
- La Capella Ducale Musica Fiata (Roland Wilson)
- Cologne Chamber Orchestra (Helmut Müller-Brühl): baroque orchestra
- Concerto Köln: baroque orchestra; concert master: Evgeny Sviridov, guest conductors inc. Evelino Pidò, Daniel Harding
- Ensemble amarcord, Leipzig, vocal ensemble, medieval, Renaissance, contemporary
- Ensemble Santenay, Trossingen, Germany: Renaissance choral
- Ensemble Schirokko Hamburg: baroque orchestra
- Estampie: medieval
- Freiburger Barockorchester (Gottfried von der Goltz): baroque orchestra
- G. A. P. Ensemble, instrumental trio
- Gaechinger Cantorey and Internationale Bachakademie, Stuttgart
- Hamburger Ratsmusik: baroque chamber orchestra
- Händelfestpielorchester, baroque chamber orchestra in Halle (Saale)
- il Gusto Barocco: baroque orchestra
- Johann Rosenmüller Ensemble (Arno Paduch): Renaissance baroque choir and orchestra
- Lautten Compagney (Wolfgang Katschner): early music ensemble
- Münchener Bach-Orchester (founder Karl Richter)
- Musica Antiqua Köln (formerly Reinhard Goebel): baroque chamber music, now disbanded
- Musica Fiata (Roland Wilson): baroque wind orchestra
- Oni Wytars (Marco Ambrosini): medieval music
- L'Orfeo Barockorchester (Michi Gaigg): baroque orchestra
- Pantagruel: Renaissance music trio
- Rheinische Kantorei and the Kleine Konzert (Hermann Max): baroque choir and orchestra
- Sarband: baroque orchestra
- Sequentia (Benjamin Bagby): medieval
- La Stagione (Michael Schneider), Frankfurt: baroque orchestra
- Studio der frühen Musik (Thomas Binkley d.), Munich: medieval, disbanded
- Telemann-Kammerorchester Michaelstein (Ludger Rémy): baroque orchestra
- Weser-Renaissance Bremen (Manfred Cordes): Renaissance and baroque

=== Greece ===
- Ex Silentio: medieval and baroque music

=== Iceland ===
- Voces Thules: Icelandic medieval music

=== Israel ===
- Jerusalem Baroque Orchestra: baroque orchestra (music director: David Shemer)
- Accademia Daniel: baroque chamber group
- Ensemble PHOENIX on period instruments: broad ensemble performing from Middle Ages to Early Romantic music on period instruments, working since 1998 (conductor & musical director Myrna Herzog)
- Profeti della Quinta, Israel/Switzerland: vocal ensemble
- Barrocade: baroque orchestra (music director: Amit Tiefenbrunn)

=== Italy ===
- Academia Montis Regalis (Alessandro De Marchi): baroque orchestra
- Accademia Bizantina (Ottavio Dantone): baroque orchestra
- Accordone (Guido Morini): early baroque, often with Marco Beasley
- Auser Musici: baroque orchestra
- Cappella della Pietà de' Turchini (Antonio Florio): baroque orchestra
- Il Complesso Barocco (Alan Curtis): baroque orchestra
- Concerto Italiano (Rinaldo Alessandrini): madrigals and baroque orchestra
- Delitiæ Musicæ: Renaissance and baroque vocal music
- Ensemble Aurora (Enrico Gatti): baroque to classical
- Ensemble Micrologus: medieval
- Europa Galante (Fabio Biondi): baroque orchestra
- I Febiarmonici (Alan Curtis): madrigals
- Il Giardino Armonico (Giovanni Antonini), Milan: baroque orchestra
- Modo Antiquo (Bettina Hoffmann and Federico Maria Sardelli): medieval music to baroque orchestra
- La Reverdie: medieval
- SimoneSorini Syrenarum (Simone Sorini Cantore al Liuto): from medieval to early baroque
- I Solisti Veneti (Claudio Scimone): baroque orchestra on modern instruments
- La Venexiana (Claudio Cavina): madrigals
- Venice Baroque Orchestra (Andrea Marcon)

=== Japan ===
- Bach Collegium Japan (Masaaki Suzuki), Kobe: Bach

=== Latvia ===
- Canto (Andris Gailis), Riga: Renaissance and baroque vocal and instrumental music
- Collegium Choro Musici Riga (Māris Kupčs): baroque choir
- Collegium Musicum Riga (Māris Kupčs): baroque orchestra
- Lirum, Riga: Renaissance vocal music ensemble
- Ludus (Māra Birziņa), Riga: late Renaissance to early baroque (chamber music)
- Schola Cantorum Riga (Guntars Prānis): gregorian and early medieval chants
- Trakula: medieval and Renaissance vocal and instrumental music

=== Mexico ===
- Mexican Baroque Orchestra: Mexico City: traditional baroque and Mexican baroque instrumentation
- Orquesta de Cámara de Celaya: Celaya, GUA: baroque and classical era orchestra

=== Netherlands ===
- Amsterdam Baroque Orchestra & Choir (Ton Koopman): baroque orchestra
- Camerata Trajectina, Utrecht: Renaissance and baroque Dutch music
- Collegium Musicum Den Haag
- Egidius Kwartet, Holland: Renaissance vocal music
- Gesualdo Consort Amsterdam: Renaissance vocal music
- Netherlands Bach Society, Utrecht: baroque ensemble
- New Dutch Academy (Simon Murphy), The Hague, 18th- and early 19th-century symphonic music
- Orchestra of the Eighteenth Century (Frans Brüggen): baroque orchestra

=== Norway ===
- Kalenda Maya

=== Poland ===
- Arte dei Suonatori
- Polish Baroque Orchestra (Krzysztof Czerwinski)

=== Portugal ===
- Concerto Atlântico (Pedro Caldeira Cabral): medieval to baroque
- Officium Ensemble (Pedro Teixeira): renaissance
- Il Dolcimelo (Isabel Monteiro): Renaissance
- Orquestra Barroca Casa da Música (Laurence Cummings): baroque orchestra
- AVRES SERVA (Nuno Oliveira): early baroque to early classical
- CONCERTO IBÉRICO ORQUESTRA BARROCA (João Paulo Janeiro): baroque orchestra
- FLORES DE MVSICA (João Paulo Janeiro): instrumental and vocal ensemble, renaissance to classical

=== Russia ===
- Insula Magica, Novosibirsk
- The Pocket Symphony (Nazar Kozhukhar), Moscow, St. Petersburg
- Pro Anima, Leningrad: 1980s, now disbanded
- La Voce Strumentale (Dmitry Sinkovsky), Moscow: baroque ensemble
- Pratum Integrum (Pavel Serbin), Moscow: baroque and classical orchestra

=== Serbia ===
- Ensemble Renaissance, Belgrade: medieval and Renaissance
- Ensemble Musica Antiqua Consort, Belgrade (1977): Medieval and Renaissance, also Baroque (vocal-instrumental ensemble, founder and director: Vera Zlokovich)
- Ensemble Musica Antiqua Serbiana, Belgrade (1987): Medieval vocal music of the Orthodox spiritual tradition (ensemble founder and director: Vera Zlokovich)
- New Trinity Baroque (Predrag Gosta), Belgrade

=== South Africa ===
- The African Renaissance Ensemble (Adam H. Golding), Johannesburg (2017): Renaissance and Baroque
- Tinta Baroque, Cape Town: Baroque

=== South Korea ===
- Collegium Vocale Seoul (Sun-ah Kim), Seoul-based choir: medieval to romantic with focus on baroque
- Musica Glorifica (Jin Kim), Seoul

=== Spain ===
- A5 vocal ensemble: vocal quintet
- Al Ayre Español (Eduardo López Banzo): baroque orchestra
- Atrium Musicae de Madrid: dissolved
- Capella de Ministrers (Carles Magraner): medieval to baroque
- La Capella Reial de Catalunya (Jordi Savall)
- L'Apothéose baroque ensemble (18th Century)
- Capilla Peñaflorida: Renaissance choral
- Cinco Siglos
- La Colombina: vocal ensemble
- Le Concert des Nations (Jordi Savall): baroque orchestra
- Hespèrion XX/Hespèrion XXI (Jordi Savall): Renaissance orchestra
- Música Antigua (Eduardo Paniagua): medieval, cantigas
- Íliber Ensemble (Darío Tamayo): baroque orchestra
- Musica Ficta (Raúl Mallavibarrena): Renaissance choral

=== Sweden ===
- Joculatores Upsalienses

=== Switzerland ===
- Alta Bellezza: early wind ensemble
- Camerata Bern (Antje Weithaas): chamber orchestra
- Contre le Temps: women's medieval vocal ensemble
- Ensemble Elyma (Gabriel Garrido): baroque orchestra
- Ferrara Ensemble (Crawford Young), Basel: medieval and Renaissance
- Gli Angeli Genève, Geneva: baroque ensemble
- La Fiamma: medieval and renaissance ensemble
- Les Passions de l’Âme – Orchester für Alte Musik Bern (Meret Lüthi): baroque orchestra
- Profeti della Quinta (Elam Rotem), Basel (2008): Renaissance and early Baroque vocal ensemble
- Students of the Schola Cantorum Basiliensis (Rene Jacobs), based in Basel: medieval to baroque

=== Taiwan ===
- Baroque Camerata
- Formosan Baroque
- The Gleam Ensemble

=== United Kingdom ===
- Academy of Ancient Music (Christopher Hogwood founder, currently Laurence Cummings): baroque orchestra
- Alamire (David Skinner): vocal consort
- Avison Ensemble: baroque orchestra
- The Band of Instruments: baroque orchestra, New Chamber Opera
- Brandenburg Consort (Roy Goodman): baroque orchestra
- Brecon Baroque (Rachel Podger): baroque orchestra
- The Brook Street Band, Handel specialists
- Cancionero, Kent
- Cantilena (Adrian Shepherd): baroque on modern instruments
- The Cardinall's Musick (Andrew Carwood): choir
- City Waites (inc. Lucie Skeaping): medieval to baroque English music and folk
- Collegium Musicum 90 (Simon Standage), English baroque orchestra
- The Consort of Musicke (Anthony Rooley): Renaissance vocal, madrigals
- Deller Consort (founded by Alfred Deller d.): Renaissance and baroque chamber
- Dufay Collective: William Lyons, artistic director, medieval and renaissance instrumental and vocal
- Dunedin Consort Director John Butt. Based in Scotland.
- Early Music Consort of London (David Munrow d.): medieval, defunct
- Early Opera Company: baroque opera
- English Baroque Soloists (John Eliot Gardiner): baroque and classical-era music
- The English Concert (Trevor Pinnock founder, then Andrew Manze, now Harry Bicket)
- Ex Cathedra (Jeffrey Skidmore): choir and baroque orchestra
- I Fagiolini: vocal consort, madrigals
- Florilegium, London: baroque
- Fretwork: viol consort
- The Gesualdo Six vocal ensemble
- Gabrieli Consort & Players (Paul McCreesh): baroque choir and orchestra
- Gothic Voices (Christopher Page): medieval and Renaissance music
- The Hanover Band: period instrument orchestra
- The Harp Consort (Andrew Lawrence-King): Renaissance consort
- The Hilliard Ensemble (formerly directed by Paul Hillier): medieval, Renaissance and contemporary music
- The King's Consort (Robert King): baroque orchestra; see also Retrospect Ensemble
- King's Singers: vocal sextet
- London Baroque (founded in 1978 by Ingrid Seifert and Charles Medlam): baroque chamber orchestra
- Magpie Lane, Oxfordshire: folk band
- Musica Reservata (John S. Beckett), London
- New London Consort (Philip Pickett): medieval to baroque orchestra
- Orchestra of the Age of Enlightenment: baroque orchestra
- Orchestre Révolutionnaire et Romantique (John Eliot Gardiner): classical and romantic orchestra
- Orlando Consort: vocal quartet
- Oxford Camerata (Jeremy Summerly): Renaissance choral
- Palladian Ensemble, British instrumental ensemble (co-founded by Rachel Podger)
- The Parley of Instruments (Roy Goodman): baroque orchestra
- Phantasm: viol consort
- Philip Jones Brass Ensemble (Philip Jones): brass quintet
- Polyphony (Stephen Layton): Renaissance, romantic and contemporary music
- Pro Cantione Antiqua: Renaissance choral
- Raglan Baroque Players (Nicholas Kraemer): baroque orchestra
- Red Priest: baroque orchestra, specializing in Vivaldi
- Retrospect Ensemble: baroque orchestra
- Rose Consort of Viols
- La Serenissima (Adrian Chandler): baroque orchestra, Vivaldi
- The Sixteen (Harry Christophers): mostly a cappella music of the Renaissance, with baroque orchestra for Handel
- Solistes de Musique Ancienne: baroque orchestra and choir
- Sounds Baroque (Julian Perkins): period instrument ensemble
- Stile Antico: early music vocal ensemble
- Tallis Scholars (Peter Phillips): a cappella Renaissance music
- Taverner Consort and Players (Andrew Parrott): Renaissance choir and baroque orchestra
- Theatre of Voices: vocal consort
- Tonus Peregrinus (Antony Pitts): Renaissance and contemporary choir
- Trinity Baroque, Trinity College, Cambridge: vocal ensemble
- Voces8: vocal ensemble
- Westminster Abbey Choir (Simon Preston)
- Westminster Cathedral Choir (David Hill)

=== United States ===
- Alkemie Early Music Ensemble
- American Bach Soloists, San Francisco Bay area
- Anonymous 4: all-female a cappella ensemble specializing in medieval music, New York City
- Apollo's Fire (Jeannette Sorrell), Renaissance, baroque, early classical orchestra, Cleveland
- Arcadia Players, Northampton, Massachusetts
- Asteria Medievale, duo, Brooklyn, New York: Renaissance chansons
- Austin Baroque Orchestra & Chorus: baroque orchestra and choir specializing in Iberian and Latin American early music
- Bach Ensemble (Joshua Rifkin): baroque soloists and orchestra
- Bach Sinfonia (Daniel Abraham), Washington, D.C.
- Baltimore Consort
- Baton Rouge Early Vocal Ensemble (BREVE): Baroque & Renaissance, Baton Rouge, LA
- Blue Heron, Boston
- Boston Baroque (Martin Pearlman): baroque orchestra
- Boston Camerata (Anne Azéma)
- Boston Early Music Festival: baroque orchestra and opera company
- Bourbon Baroque (Nicolas Fortin and John Austin Clark): baroque orchestra, Louisville, Kentucky
- Camerata Mediterranea (Joel Cohen), Boston
- Chanticleer: choir, San Francisco
- Concordian Dawn, New York City
- Early Music New York, medieval, Renaissance, baroque and classical
- Ensemble Alcatraz (Shira Kammen): medieval, San Francisco Bay area
- Fanfare Barok, baroque, Washington, D.C.
- Folger Consort, Washington, D.C.
- Handel and Haydn Society, baroque choir and orchestra, Boston
- Indianapolis Baroque Orchestra (Barthold Kuijken)
- Istanpitta Early Music Ensemble (Albert Cofrin): medieval, Houston, TX
- Krewe de Voix (Paul Weber): renaissance and baroque choir, New Orleans, LA
- Louisiana Baroque Chamber Orchestra— LABCO (Riccardo Leónida): baroque, New Orleans, LA
- Lyra Baroque Orchestra (Jacques Ogg): baroque to early classical orchestra, St. Paul, MN
- Lyrica Baroque (Benjamin Atherholt): baroque, New Orleans, LA
- Magnificat Baroque Ensemble, San Francisco Bay area
- Marais Baroque Ensemble: baroque, New Orleans, LA
- Music of the Baroque (Jane Glover), Chicago
- Musica Angelica (Martin Haselböck), Los Angeles
- New Orleans Musica da Camera (Milton Scheuermann, Thais St. Julien): medieval, defunct; radio show Continuum still available
- New Trinity Baroque (Predrag Gosta), Atlanta
- New York Collegium (Andrew Parrott), dissolved
- New York Polyphony
- New York Pro Musica Antiqua (Noah Greenberg d. 1966, then John Reeves White to 1974): choir, defunct
- Newberry Consort, at the Newberry Library, baroque chamber, Chicago
- Newport Baroque Orchestra, Newport, RI
- North Carolina Baroque Orchestra, Davidson, NC
- Opera Lafayette: pre-1800 opera, Washington, D.C.
- Philharmonia Baroque Orchestra (Nicholas McGegan): baroque orchestra, San Francisco
- Piffaro, The Renaissance Band, Philadelphia
- Portland Baroque Orchestra (Julian Perkins), Portland, OR
- Project Ars Nova Ensemble PAN: medieval, Boston
- Quartet Salonnières, New York City
- Relic, greater Washington, D.C. area
- Renaissance Street Singers, a cappella Renaissance, New York City
- Roanoque Baroque (Michael Shasberger), Roanoke, Virginia
- Rose Ensemble Jordan Sramek, St. Paul
- Schola Antiqua of Chicago
- Spiritus Mundi Crescentis (Claudia Copeland): medieval, New Orleans, LA
- Texas Early Music Project, Austin, Texas
- Tempesta di Mare: The Philadelphia Baroque Orchestra (Gwyn Roberts and Richard Stone, co-diorectors)
- TENET (ensemble), now known as TENET Vocal Artists, New York City
- Three Notch'd Road: The Virginia Baroque Ensemble, Charlottesville, VA
- Virginia Tech Early Music Ensemble, Blacksburg, VA
- Voices of Music, San Francisco, California
- Wyoming Baroque, Sheridan, Wyoming

=== Unspecified or international ===
- Cappella Mediterranea (Leonardo García-Alarcón)
- Ensemble Syntagma (Alexandre Danilevsky)
- European Community Baroque Orchestra (Roy Goodman), European Union
