= Musica Ficta (disambiguation) =

Musica ficta is a Latin musical term for 'feigned music'.

Musica Ficta may also refer to:

- Música Ficta (Colombian ensemble) or Música Ficta, an early music ensemble founded in Bogotá, Colombia, in 1988
- Musica Ficta (Spanish ensemble), a Spanish early music ensemble founded in 1992 by Raúl Mallavibarrena
- Musica Ficta (Danish ensemble), a Danish choral group founded in 1996 by Bo Holten
- Musica Ficta (Italian ensemble), a musical ensemble
- Musica Ficta, a novel by Anne Kennedy
