= Malvern Fringe Festival =

- Type: non-profit
- Industry: Fringe theatre
- Founded: 1977
- Headquarters: Great Malvern, England
- Key people: Phil Linnell, Chairman
- Products: Spring Festival, Live music, Cabaret, Poetry, Comedy
- Revenue: non-profit
- Number of employees: Voluntary

The Malvern Fringe Festival was an arts festival (founded 1977) which took place in Great Malvern, England. The main events of the Malvern Fringe Festival were the annual Malvern May Day and parade, and the annual three-day festival held in June as a fringe to the Elgar Festival. These were often accompanied by musical and other live events throughout the year.

== History ==
Malvern Fringe Parade

Malvern Fringe Festival was founded in 1977 by Adrian Mealing, a teacher in Malvern, in collaboration with Andrew Sleigh, Ian Fearnside and Phil Webb. It originated as a reaction to the Malvern Festival which was perceived to be biased towards classical music and appealing towards a national and international audience rather than a local one. A further concern was the continued requirement for the local Council to underwrite the main festival and the feeling that the public expenditure could be more wisely spent.

The founding aims of the Fringe were to produce a popular, varied programme of events for the local people of Malvern, to bridge the gap between the "us" and "them" in the arts and to "shake it up a bit in Malvern".

The first year featured 60 events consisting of poetry, world music, folk, jazz, adult and children's theatre performed under the banner of "Associated Events" due to the main Festival's objections to the term 'Fringe', which they considered to be "outside" of the Festival. In 1978, to avoid confusion between the programmes for the two festivals, printed with similar designs at the main festival's insistence, Adrian Mealing hand wrote "Fringe" on over 3000 programmes. As the 1980s approached, the festival grew into a four-week event and the Fringe had established its own identity. Being centrally located between Hereford, Worcester, Gloucester and Cheltenham the Fringe drew a wide audiences from over a 20-mile radius.

During the 1980s, the festival attracted hundreds of visitors with a programme of 120 events over a two-week period. In 1982, Malvern Fringe Arts Ltd became a registered charity. By the 1990s, the Fringe programme had grown to a six-week event and was attracting comedy and cabaret acts that were beginning to establish their reputations, including Eddie Izzard, Lee Evans, Jerry Sadowitz, Jim Tavare, Chris Lynam and a double act featuring Linda Smith and Mark Thomas, plus musical acts as varied as Gong, Juicy Lucy, Voodoo Queens and Loop Guru.

May Day procession in Church Street

In 2006 the Fringe re-launched its three-day festival in June, loosely based upon a theme of Elgar's interests. One of the highlights of this festival was a bicycle race (as cycling was one of Elgar's keen interests) up the steep incline of Great Malvern's Church Street. This event was supported by Commonwealth Games gold medalist Liam Killeen, who's from Malvern, and was won by Tour de France cyclist, Arnaud Lenoir. The whole three-day festival was attended by over 5,000 people.

In the autumn of 2006, the Fringe launched a 'folk weekend' featuring Roy Bailey and Jez Lowe.

== Malvern May Day ==
The Malvern May Day and Parade are an annual community event which has been held in Priory Park, Great Malvern on the Saturday before the May Bank Holiday since 1993.

== Local controversy ==
Despite an attendance of over 5,000 people the June 2006 festival, 99.9% of whom were having a great free day out, May Day organisers were only made aware of one complainant (the same one every year) who objected to the music in the bandstand. He did try to call upon readers of the Malvern Gazette to petition the local Member of Parliament to halt any further Fringe activities, without much success. Malvern May Day organisers always complied with the MHDC Environmental Health officers in regard to noise levels throughout the day.

== Notable past performers ==
Throughout its history Malvern Fringe featured an impressive array of performers, many of whom have gone on to become international stars.

=== Classical ===
- Amsterdam Loeki Stardust Quartet
- National Youth Recorder Orchestra
- Edwin Roxburgh and the Hendrickse Flute Quartet

=== Music ===
- 3 Daft Monkeys
- Daevid Allen
- Roy Bailey
- Bhundu Boys
- Caravan
- Lol Coxhill
- Fred Zeppelin
- Gong
- Gordon Giltrap
- The Groundhogs
- Left, Right and Centre (featuring Nigel Kennedy and Caleb)
- Juicy Lucy
- Kroke
- Jez Lowe
- Jim MacCool
- Loop Guru
- Moishe's Bagel
- Rory McLeod and Tymon Dogg
- Moonshake
- Ozric Tentacles
- Hazel O'Connor
- Pantagruel
- Prophets of Da City
- Surgeon
- Suns of Arqa
- June Tabor and Huw Warren
- Tarika Sammy
- Barbara Thompson's Paraphernalia
- Voodoo Queens
- The Wurzels
- Zion Train

=== Dance ===
- Lousie Tonkin and Lol Coxhill

=== Poetry ===
- Dannie and Joan Abse
- Jim MacCool
- John Cooper Clarke
- John Hegley
- Adrian Henri
- Michael Horovitz and Stan Tracey
- Frances Horovitz and Pete Morgan
- Joolz
- Linton Kwesi Johnson
- Ian McMillan
- Dick McBride
- Roger McGough
- Henry Normal
- Lemn Sissay
- Gabriel Woolf

=== Comedy ===
- Rowan Atkinson
- Jo Brand
- Jack Dee
- Jenny Eclair
- Lee Evans
- Jeremy Hardy
- Eddie Izzard
- The Kipper Family
- Mark Lamarr
- Al Murray
- Jerry Sadowitz
- Linda Smith and Mark Thomas
- Mark Steel
- Jim Tavare

=== Literature ===
- Romesh Gunesekera

=== Theatre ===
- Oxford University Revue
- The Theatre of Small Convenience
