= Tenet (ensemble) =

TENET
- Genres: Early music
- Years active: 2009–present
- Website: www.tenet.nyc

Tenet (stylized as TENET), currently known as TENET Vocal Artists, is an early music vocal and instrumental ensemble based in New York City. They perform on period instruments, and specialize in one-voice-per-part singing. Called “a major force in the New York early music world" (The New York Times), TENET maintains a flexible roster of professional musicians from across the US and the world. Their singers have garnered praise for performing with "an uncanny degree of precision” (The Boston Globe).

Tenet frequently collaborates with other early music ensembles across the country, including Blue Heron, Piffaro, The Renaissance Band, Dark Horse Consort, The Sebastians, New York Polyphony, Five Boroughs Music Festival, and others.

== History ==
Soprano and artistic director Jolle Greenleaf took over the Tiffany Consort in 2009, and changed the name to Tenet. Since then, Tenet has presented a series of concerts in New York City and the surrounding area, as well as touring around the country and internationally. Past projects include a cycle of unconducted masterworks by J.S. Bach including St. Matthew Passion, St. John Passion, Christmas Oratorio, Magnificat, Bach's motets, and Bach's Mass in B minor, other masterworks including Handel’s Messiah, a three-year cycle of Carlo Gesualdo’s Tenebrae Responsories, regular performances of works by Purcell and his contemporaries celebrating St. Cecilia (music’s patron saint), medieval survey series curated by Robert Mealey and Shira Kammen, and highlighting works composed by, for, and about women in 17th century Italy, including Barbara Strozzi, Isabella Leonarda, and Chiara Margarita Cozzolani.

Tenet has been credited for helping to raise the profile of New York's early music scene. They were described by The New York Times as "stellar" and "an excellent vocal ensemble." Tenet has performed at Carnegie's Zankel Hall, the Metropolitan Museum of Art, Rockefeller University, Columbia University, Yale University, and many other venues across New York City.

Tenet has been invited to perform at numerous festivals across the country, in Latin America, and in Europe, including Caramoor Summer Music Festival, Skaneateles Festival, Berkshire Bach Festival, Festival Casals de Puerto Rico, Costa Rica International Music Festival, and Montreal Baroque Festival.

In 2018, on the occasion of its tenth anniversary season, the group changed its name to "TENET Vocal Artists."

=== Green Mountain Project ===
In 2010, Jolle Greenleaf joined forces with Boston violinist Scott Metcalfe to present Monteverdi's 1610 Vespro della Beata Vergine for its 400th anniversary, performing as the Green Mountain Project (a translation of Monteverdi's name). The success of this concert inspired Greenleaf and Metcalfe to make it an annual event.

In 2012 Metcalfe assembled a Vespers service from music by Monteverdi and some of his contemporaries. The Green Mountain Project (as a sub-project of Tenet) presented this in concert as the "Vespers of 1640." Unlike Monteverdi's 1610 Vespers, this was not a pre-existing collection of music, but followed the format of a Vespers service from the time. The same concept was the basis for a different Monteverdi service "Vespers for the Feast of St. John the Baptist", presented by Tenet in 2014, and a Vespers service by Marc-Antoine Charpentier presented in 2015.

In 2020, TENET performed the tenth and final iteration of the Green Mountain Project in New York City at the Church of St. Jean Baptiste and at Santi Giovanni e Paolo in Venice.

== Discography ==
- 2010 - Monteverdi Vespers of 1610, Live
- 2011 - A Feast for the Senses
- 2012 - A Grand Festive Vespers, Live
- 2013 - UNO + ONE
- 2016 - The Secret Lover
- 2019 - Le memorie dolorose
- 2020 - Vespers of 1610
- 2020 - Love Enfolds Thee Round
