= VOM =

VOM or Vom may refer to:

== Music ==
- VOM (music), Voices of Music – an early music ensemble
- VOM (punk rock band)

== Science ==
- Venus Orbiter Mission
- VOM = Volt-Ohm-Milliammeter, another name for a multimeter
- Variable-order Markov model
- A German word, the contraction of von dem, meaning "from the"; used in surnames as a toponymic particle, see von.

== Radio stations ==
- Voice of Malaysia, defunct Malaysian international shortwave radio station
- Voice of Maldives
- Voice of Mongolia

== Other ==
- Voice of the Martyrs, a group of Christian organizations devoted to raising awareness of persecutions of Christians around the world
- Vom, a fictional character in the science fiction novel Bloodhype by Alan Dean Foster
