= Colegio San Carlos =

Private Catholic school in Bogotá, Colombia

CSC Colegio San Carlos
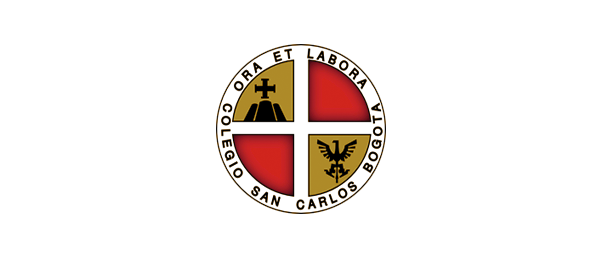
- Coat of arms

Location
- Calle 192 No. 9 – 45; Bogotá, D.C. Colombia; 4°46′6″N 74°2′7″W

Information
- Type: Private, All-boys, Catholic
- Motto: Ora et Labora – Pray and Work (in Latin)
- Established: 1960; 66 years ago (Officially opened in 1961)
- Principal: Juan Fernando Corral Strassman
- Grades: Transition through 11th Grade.
- Enrollment: 1400 (yearly)
- Campus type: Urban-Country
- Colors: Green and Yellow
- Mascot: Bulldog
- Newspaper: El Carlista, later re-named El Sancarlista; Al Rojo; Mama Gallo; Catarsis (bimonthly)
- Affiliation: Roman Catholic / Benedictine and Nonsectarian
- Website: sancarlos.edu.co

Colegio San Carlos is an all-male, private, bilingual (Spanish and English) school in Bogotá, Colombia. The school has been recognized as one of the sources of many national leaders.

The school works under the auspice of the local Roman Catholic Benedictine Monasterio de Tibatí, and the Assumption Abbey in Richardton, North Dakota, United States. It enrolls 1,400 students in grades transition through 11th grade which is equivalent to 1st through 12th grades or a combined primary and secondary education in the United States. San Carlos has welcomed students from all creeds and religions: it is not mandatory to be a Catholic to be a San Carlos student. The school has also welcomed people from all walks of life and nationalities, since its inception. However, an IQ test and other intelligence and dexterity examinations are required for students' enrollment in the school.

San Carlos is named after Saint Charles Borromeo and its motto, Ora et Labora ("Pray and Work" in Latin), is based on the teachings of Saint Benedict.

== History ==
In April 1960, Abbot Ignatius Hunkler received an invitation from Colombian Archbishop Luis Concha Córdoba to establish a boys school in Bogotá. The Abbot in turn invited him to Assumption Abbey in Richardton, North Dakota, in order to present this proposal to the monastic community. He went there, and the monks agreed to accept the task. As a result, monks Lawrence Wagner O.S.B., Frederic Mundt O.S.B., Anselm Ruelle O.S.B. and Adrian Mundt O.S.B., were sent to Puerto Rico in June to learn Spanish. They arrived in Bogotá on August 6, 1960, the same day the city was celebrating its foundation -(it was founded in 1538). They immediately began preparations to run the school. Colegio San Carlos officially opened its doors on February 4, 1961. Since its inception in the 1960s, the school has been educating future scientists, politicians, doctors, lawyers, engineers, artists, architects and many others to be leaders in their professions and their communities.

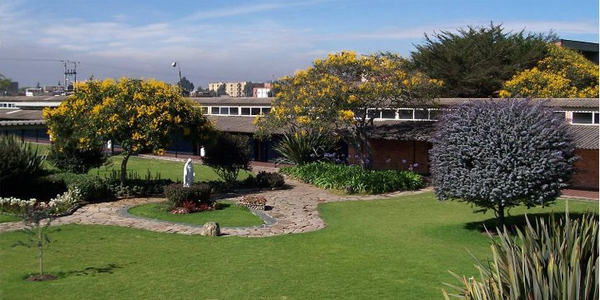
CSC: View of the campus.

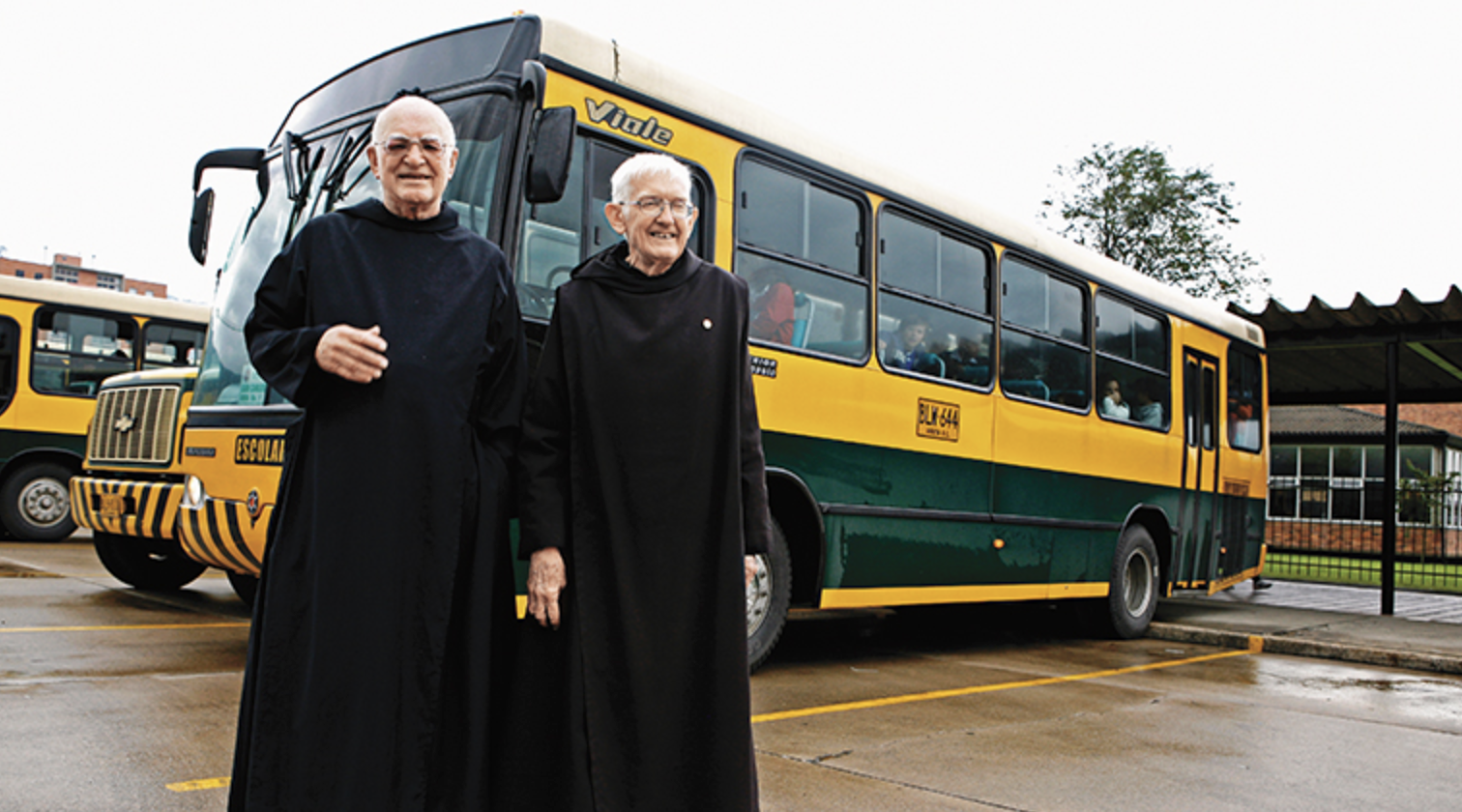
Fathers Sebastian Schmidt (left) and Francis Wehri (right), former rectors of Colegio San Carlos.

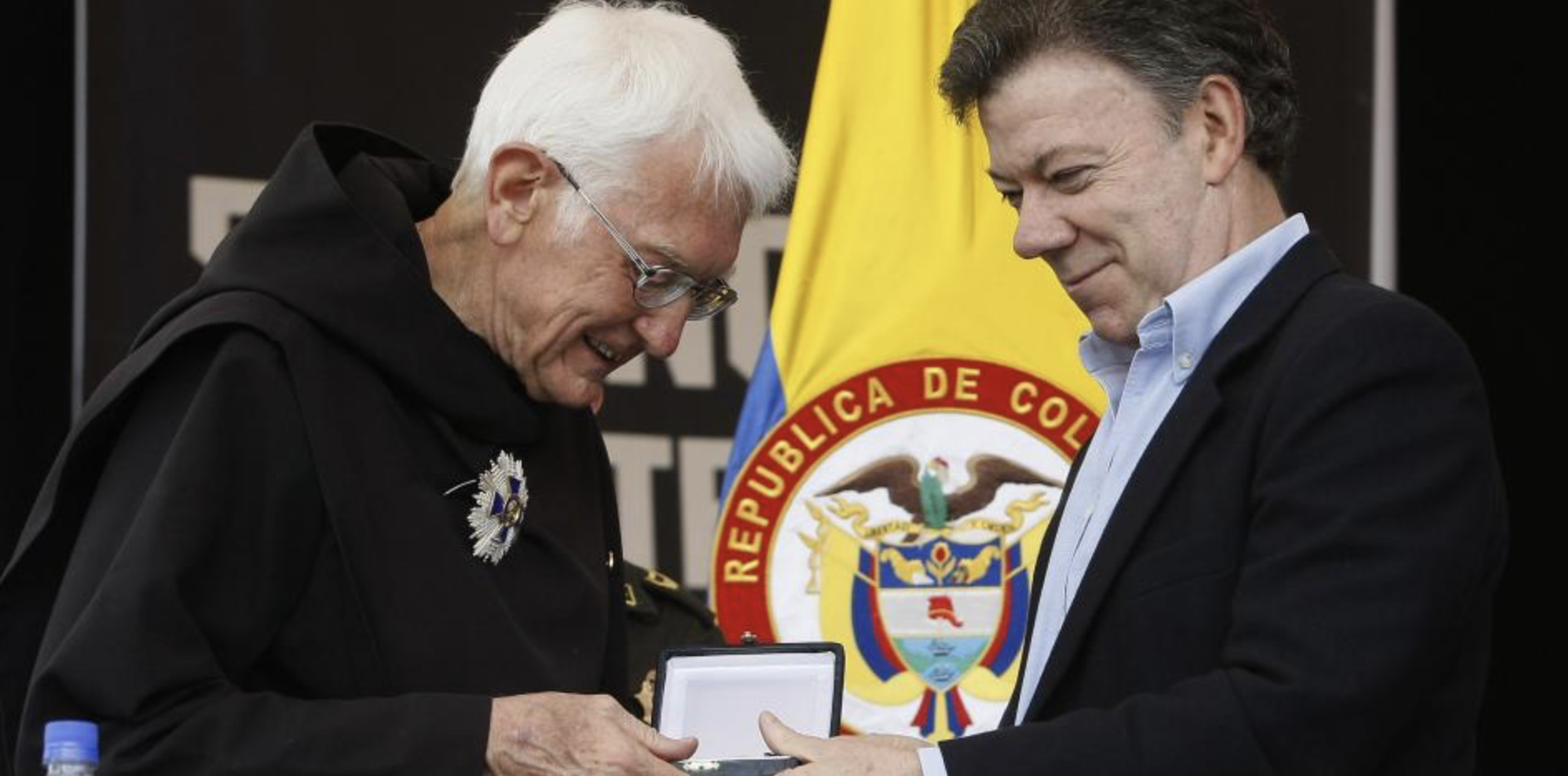
2011: Juan Manuel Santos awards Fr. Francis Wehri the "Cruz de Boyacá", Colombia's highest distinction.

The school's most important principals have been Fr. Sebastian Schmidt O.S.B. (1934-2017) who was rector only for a few years, but remained a strong presence throughout the history of the school as a teacher, staff member and sports coach, and Fr. Francis Wehri O.S.B. who by mid-1966 replaced Schmidt.

Wehri, also born in 1934, was in charge of leading the school for 49 continuous years. A dedicated musician (proficient in piano and organ), he arrived in Colombia with little knowledge of Spanish, and took the office of rector at 36 years of age. He soon managed to become a permanent reference for excellence in educational standards and academic guidance on a national level. After many years in this tenure he was awarded Colombian honorary citizenship by president Juan Manuel Santos, and in 2011 also received the country's highest distinction: The Cruz de Boyacá. After a short period of illness, Wehri resigned his post as rector, but decided to stay in Colombia and continue residing at the school's monastery. He died in Bogotá on July 30, 2017, and was replaced two years before his death by secular and current rector Juan Fernando Corral Strassman, a 1970s alumnus.

== Academic performance ==
Colegio San Carlos is highly recognized in Colombia for consistently directly placing some 15% of its graduates in universities throughout the world. Some of the prestigious schools that San Carlistas have attended directly after graduation include: MIT, UC Berkeley, Stanford University, Cornell University, UCLA, UC Merced, Georgetown University, Lehigh University, University of Navarra, Harvard University, Princeton University, University of Pennsylvania, University of Chicago, Columbia University, Brown University, RISD, University of Michigan, University of Miami, Cambridge University, Oxford University, Architectural Association School of Architecture and the London School of Economics. Many San Carlos graduates who study in Colombian universities later apply for postgraduate studies abroad.

Even though the school has not adopted any international teaching system such as the AP or IB, its high-profile compulsory curriculum ensures a high-quality, fully bilingual, homogeneous education for its pupils. All graduating students must take the ICFES national standardized exam. Students wishing to study abroad are encouraged to sit for standardized tests such as the SAT or the ACT.

In 2011 the school celebrated its 50th anniversary. At the time, 3,404 students had officially graduated.

Colegio San Carlos has consistently ranked 1st among the ten most important schools in Colombia, and has earned notoriety in Maths, Biology, Chemistry and Physics performance on a national and international level.

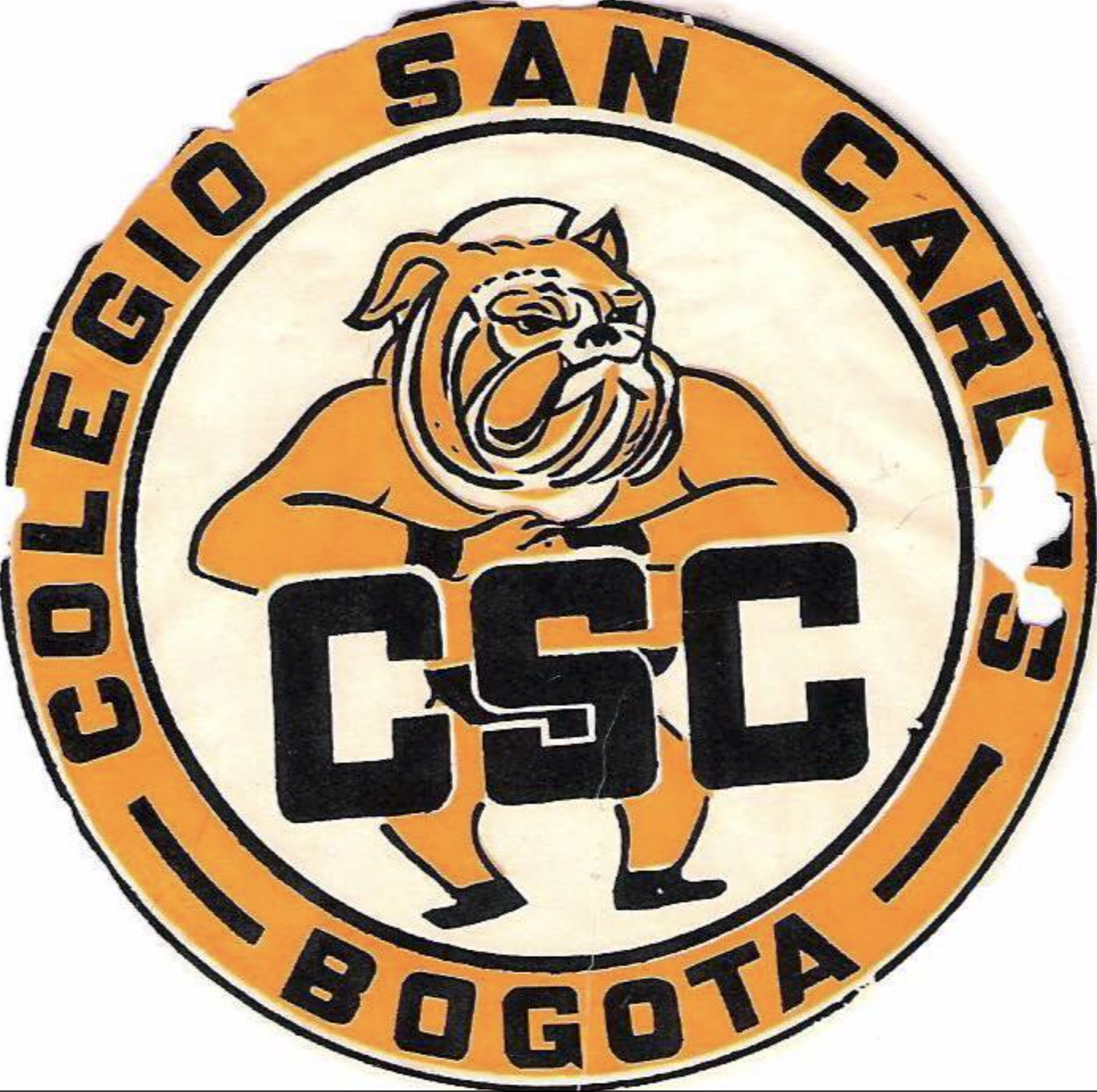
Vintage Mascot: The Colegio San Carlos bulldog on an early 1970s sticker.

== Notable alumni ==
Includes year of graduation or time spent in the school. Sorted alphabetically by last name:

- Andrés Pastrana Arango, 1972 - former Mayor of Bogotá, former President of Colombia (1998–2002), former Ambassador of Colombia to the United States, and son of Misael Pastrana Borrero (also former President of Colombia from 1970 to 1974)
- Andrés Cabas, 1995 - musician, singer
- Francisco Santos Calderón, 1979 - former vice-president of Colombia (2002–2010 - during Álvaro Uribe Vélez's presidency). Current Ambassador of Colombia to the United States
- Juan Manuel Santos Calderón, former President of Colombia (2010-2018), recipient of the 2016 Nobel Peace Prize, Minister of National Defense during Uribe's presidency. Santos studied at San Carlos until 9th grade and completed high school studies while serving for the Colombian Navy in the city of Cartagena
- Mateo Camargo, 1996 - musician, guitarist of Madina Lake
- Andrés Cepeda, musician, singer (studied at San Carlos until 6th grade)
- Miguel Gómez, 1992 - New York based photographer, visual artist and photography lecturer
- Gabriel Silva Luján, 1976 - former Ambassador of Colombia to the United States, former Minister of National Defense, and general manager of the National Federation of Coffee Growers of Colombia
- Luis Alberto Moreno, 1971 - former Ambassador of Colombia to the United States under Andrés Pastrana's presidency, former President of the Instituto de Fomento Industrial. Current President of the Inter-American Development Bank where he has served since 2005
- Juan Sebastián Muñoz, 2011 - professional golfer
- Mauricio Rodríguez Múnera, 1975 - journalist, diplomat, former ambassador of Colombia to the United Kingdom
- Stefano Quintarelli, 1981 - Italian congressman, and president of Agencia Digital Italiana
- Carlos Serrano, 1981 - musician in the Baroque and Classical Genres, recorder player and founder of Música Ficta
- Juan Pablo Shuk, 1984 - television and film actor in Colombia, currently based in Spain
- Felipe Torres Medina Primetime Emmy Award for Outstanding Writing for a Variety Series, 2009 - writer, five time Emmy nominated TV writer for the Late Show with Stephen Colbert.

== Sports ==
Colegio San Carlos has a rich history of participation in competitions and winning sports championships especially in basketball, football, volleyball and track and field. The school is an active founding member of the UNCOLI Association (Union of International Schools in Bogotá), which currently has 27 participating associates. Fr. Sebastian Schmidt was on the board of UNCOLI from the start, alongside Howard Paul from Colegio Nueva Granada. San Carlos students are encouraged to participate in athletics from a young age. Historical sports rivalries have been strong between San Carlos and both Colegio Nueva Granada, Gimnasio Campestre, Lycée français Louis Pasteur (Spanish: Liceo Francés Louis Pasteur), and Lycée Français International de Bogotá (English: International French Lyceum of Bogotá).

Competitive tournaments with other UNCOLI schools are available in the following age categories:

- Mayores (grades 11 and 10)
- Juvenil (grades 9 and 8)
- Infantil (grades 7 and 6)
- Pre-Infantil (grades 5 and 4)
- Benjamines (grade 3, non-sanctioned)

The school is equipped with two full-sized football fields, eight outdoor basketball courts, five outdoor volleyball courts, a 400 m outdoor track and two multi-purpose indoor gyms used for basketball and volleyball competitions. In football, basketball and volleyball, the school has won over more than 250 titles in its history, making it the most successful school in the UNCOLI tournament's history.
