= Magnificat Baroque Ensemble =

The Magnificat Baroque Ensemble, or Magnificat, is an early music ensemble of voices and instruments specializing in the Baroque music of the 17th century under the artistic direction of Baroque cellist Warren Stewart. Stewart founded the ensemble in San Francisco in 1989 with Baroque harpsichordist Susan Harvey. Harvey resigned in 2000, and the group has remained under the sole musical direction of Stewart since then. The group derives its name from the first word of the Latin translation of the Canticle of Mary in the Gospel of Luke (Luke 1:46–55), Magnificat anima mea, "My soul magnifies the Lord", which is sung during the Roman Catholic evening prayer or vespers service.

The ensemble's repertoire covers the sweep of religious, stage, and chamber music of the 17th Century by such giants as Claudio Monteverdi, Giacomo Carissimi, Alessandro Stradella, Marc-Antoine Charpentier, Heinrich Schütz, Dieterich Buxtehude, Henry Purcell, and lesser-known and infrequently performed composers of the era.

Magnificat has particularly championed and performed music by women composers Francesca Caccini, Isabella Leonarda, Barbara Strozzi and Chiara Margarita Cozzolani and has hosted a conference on Women and Music in Seventeenth Century Italy. Magnificat's annual concerts, recordings, and participation in music festivals have won audience and critical acclaim, and engaged the collaboration of respected scholars and musicologists.

In addition to their own concerts in the San Francisco Bay Area, Magnificat has been presented by The Berkeley Early Music Festival, The Seattle Early Music Guild, The Carmel Bach Festival, Music Before 1800, The Tropical Baroque Festival, and The Society for Seventeenth Century Music. They have recorded for the Koch International and Music Omnia labels.

Since 1989 Magnificat has provided period instrument ensembles to San Francisco Bay Area choral groups desiring to bring historically-informed performance practice to their concerts through its affiliate, the Jubilate Orchestra, which has now collaborated in over 300 performances with a variety of groups.

== Repertoire ==
Magnificat's repertoire includes the genres of sacred music motets, masses, vespers, cantatas and oratorios, as well as vocal chamber music, opera, pastorales and other works for the stage. It is particularly noted for its musical reconstruction of religious works in the liturgical context in which they were first performed. Religious works are performed with all the music a 17th-century audience would have heard in church including liturgical chants and prayers. Audiences are invited to join in singing congregational hymns and chorales that form part of the reconstruction.

Outstanding among its reconstructions is the performance of all the music performed at the rededication of the chapel of St. Gertrude in Hamburg in 1607. A premier musical establishment severely damaged by fire, its rededication drew the collaboration of major composers of North Germany. Following the composer's suggestion Magnificat performed Heinrich Schütz’ Musikalische Exequien as a paraphrase for the Kyrie and Gloria in a Lutheran mass for the Feast of the Purification at the Berkeley Early Music Festival in 1996 and again in their own series in 2009.

Magnificat's signature work is Monteverdi's great Vespro della Beata Vergine 1610 (Vespers of the Blessed Virgin of 1610) written to win the prestigious musical directorship of St. Mark's in Venice and which Magnificat performed in 1994 and 1999. It was again performed in 2010 to mark the work's 400th anniversary.

Magnificat has performed the first opera buffa featuring a basso buffo in the title role, Stradella's Il Trespolo tutore, and will perform the first opera written by a woman, Francesca Caccini's La Liberazione di Ruggiero in October 2009. It has also staged performances of Charpentier's rarely performed music for Jean-Baptiste Molière's comedy Le Malade Imaginaire.

Notable among its opera productions have been its performances with the Carter Family Marionettes of the puppet opera La Grandmère amoureuse by Fuzelier and Dorneval from the ParisianThéâtre de la foire "theaters of the fair" tradition and Jacopo Melani’s Il Girello. The October 2009 presentations of Caccini's La Liberazione di Ruggiero will be performed with the Carters according to the Sicilian puppet tradition.

== Esthetic ==
Emerging from the early music revival Magnificat was originally conceived as a collective of equal parts - a "chamber music" esthetic grounded in the talent and individual inspiration of Magnificat's musicians that is reflected in its interpretations and recognized by its audiences. Over the years, Magnificat has been guided by the spirit of the period in its emphasis on dramatic narrative and sensitive emotional expression. The ensemble has given numerous contemporary premieres of music not heard for the last 200 – 300 years. Because much music of the 17th century still remains unavailable, performing editions have been prepared from original manuscript sources by Stewart and musicologists on Magnificat's Artistic Advisory Board.

== Organization ==
Magnificat is a California 501(c)(3) non-profit organization governed by a board of directors whose current president is Nicholas Elsishans. Stewart serves as its musical director and Dominque Pelletey as its managing director. Nina Korniyenko serves as creative director and Boby Borisov as audio engineer. The group's agent is Robert Friedman Presents.

An advisory board of scholars and musicologists contribute advice, performing editions, and scholarly essays for programs, websites, and CD notes which are posted on Magnificat's website. Advisory board members are Alan Curtis of the ensemble Il Complesso Barocco; Robert Kendrick (University of Chicago); Jeffrey Kurtzman (Washington University in St. Louis); John Powell, (University of Tulsa); Elanor Selfridge-Field (Stanford University); and Kate van Orden (University of California, Berkeley).

== Recent performance history ==
=== 2009–2010 ===
- Francesca Caccini: La Liberazione di Ruggiero
- Chiara Margarita Cozzolani: Mass for Christmas Day
- Alessandro Grandi and Tarquinio Merula: Celesti Fiori
- Claudio Monteverdi: Vespro della Beata Vergine 1610

=== 2008–2009 ===
- Marc-Antoine Charpentier: Les plaisirs de Versailles and La Couronne des Fleurs
- Giovanni Antonio Rigatti: Motets
- Heinrich Schütz: Musikalische Exequien as a setting for a Mass for the Feast of the Purification
- Alessandro Scarlatti: Venere, Amore, e Ragione

=== 2007–2008 ===
Musical reconstruction of the 1607 Re-Dedication of St. Gertrude's Chapel in Hamburg

- Alessandro Scarlatti and Arcangelo Corelli: Christmas Cantatas for the papal court
- Marc-Antoine Charpentier: Petits Motets
- Alessandro Stradella: Il Trespolo tutore

=== 2006–2007 ===
- Marc-Antoine Charpentier: Le Jugement de Solomon
- Dieterich Buxtehude: Cantatas for Advent and Christmas
- Alessandro Stradella: Oratorio per La Susanna
- Chiara Margarita Cozzolani: Vespro della Beata Vergine

=== 2005–2006 ===
- Giovanni Battista Guarini: Il Pastor Fido settings by various composers
- Marc-Antoine Charpentier: Pastorale sur la Naissance de Nostre Seigneur
- Johann Rosenmüller: Vespers for the Feast of the Annunciation

== Discography ==
- Chiara Margarita Cozzolani: Vespro della Beata Vergine - Musica Omnia MO0103 released December, 2001
- Chiara Margarita Cozzolani: Messa Pascale - Musica Omnia MO0209 released July, 2002
- Giacomo Carissimi: Oratorio - Vanitas Vanitatum
- Emilio de' Cavalieri: Opera - Rappresentatione di Anima, et di Corpo - Koch International

CD's and downloads of these recordings are available at Magnificat's website as are selections of individual pieces from its performances.

== See also ==
- Early music
- Early music revival
- Baroque music
- Historically-informed performance
- List of early music ensembles

== External sources ==
- Magnificat website
- Magnificat blog
- Carter Family Marionettes
- Magnificat Musicians
- Creative Director Nika Korniyenko
- Jubilate Orchestra Projects
