= Musica Ficta (Italian ensemble) =

Ensemble Musica Ficta was an Italian early-music ensemble active in the late 1980s and early 1990s. The group consisted of Bruno Ré, Paolo Capirci, Fabio Menditto, Federico Marincola, Andrea Damiani, with tenor Marco Beasley.

== Discography ==
- Musique Baroque À Naples : Emanuele Barbella, Gaetano Latilla, Francesco Mancini, G.-C. Rubino Cantata « Lena ». G.-B. Porsile: Cantata sopra l'arcicalascione. Marco Beasley, Ensemble Musica Ficta. Pierre Verany 1989
