= Jin Kim =

Jin Kim may refer to:

- Jin Kim (violinist)
- Jin Kim (animator)
- Jin Kim (Entrepreneur)
