= Jim MacCool =

Jim MacCool (born 1954) is a British dramatic poet in the shanachie or travelling bard tradition. MacCool is the author of Ionan Tales, a series of twelve lengthy tales in verse inspired by the Canterbury Tales and which he has performed more than a thousand times in places from Brisbane to Chicago since their premiere at a Sunday Times–sponsored Literary Festival at the 2000 Millennium. His shows typically combine his singing of Irish or Scots folk ballads, such as "The Belle of Belfast City" or "Whiskey in the Jar", a poetic recitation and a Celtic drum performance. MacCool is the founder and patron of Britain's National Poetry Month and in August 2006 was named poet-in-residence for Dudley, West Midlands.

On 13 November 2004, he presented two of his stories "The Boxer's Tale" and the "Story of Sawney Bean" in Pember Heath Village Hall, along with his renditions of Irish and Scottish folk ballads. One story told of a boxer's greed, drug abuse and the revenge of his lover that left him in a wheelchair, while the second told of Sawney Bean and his wife Black Agnes, who dabbled in witchcraft and cannibalism at the time of King James VI of Scotland.

During the May 2008 Malvern Fringe Festival, he performed two shows in rotation 18 times each over a six-day period. MacCool has also performed at the Buxton Fringe Festival and the Camden Fringe Festival, as well as at schools.

Jim MacCool took part in the Buxton Fringe Festival in 2008 and 2010.

Jim lives in South Ayrshire and continues to run the family firm. He toured extensively throughout the UK and Ireland until Covid. Over a twenty-five year period, Jim visited more than 2400 educational establishments, both at home and abroad. He continues to write prolifically. Here is a list of present publications easily available from Invergarven Press:

- Hard Times pub. Jan. 2021 ISBN 978-1-7399244-0-9
- A Wee Book O’ Limericks pub. Jan. 2022 ISBN 978-1-7399244-1-6
- Jim MacCool Tips His Bonnet To The Sonnet pub. Mar. 2022 ISBN 978-1-7399244-2-3
- When Pushkin Came To Shovekin… MacCool On Tour with Alexander Pushkin pub. Jul. 2022 ISBN 978-1-7399244-4-7
- The Parliament of Fowls pub. Aug. 2022 ISBN 978-1-7399244-3-0
- Yaketty-Yak…Pasternak! MacCool On Tour with Verse inspired by Boris Pasternak pub. Jan. 2023 ISBN 978-1-7399244-5-4
- Bleak Hoose Terse Verse from a Year and Worse Performance Poetry Soc. Book of the Year pub. Feb. 2023 ISBN 978-1-7399244-6-1
- Parallel Lives Pub. 2024 ISBN 978-1-7399244-7-8
- Behind The Mirror Pub. 2025 ISBN 978-1-7399244-8-5
- Siftings Pub. 2025 ISBN 978-1-7399244-9-2
