= Simone Balsamino =

Italian composer, poet, and dramatist

Simone Balsamino (fl. 1590s in Venice) was an Italian composer, poet and dramatist. He was the first to set texts from Tasso's Aminta as Aminta musicale. He is also credited with the invention of the bass cittern.

== Works, editions and recordings ==
- Perla a tragicomedia in music dedicated to the marchese De La Rovere. Venice 1596.
- Le novellette a sei voci ed. Chegai, Andrea Le novelette a sei voci di Simone Balsamino. Prime musiche di „Aminta " di Torquato Tasso, Firenze: Olschki 1993 (Historiae Musicae Cultores Biblioteca 69)
- Balsamino & Monteverdi: Novellette e Madrigali - dir. Diego Fasolis, Vanitas Ensemble, and Guido Morini (Audio CD - 2002)
