= Cinco Siglos =

Spanish musical ensemble

Cinco Siglos is a musical ensemble devoted to the early music. It was founded in Córdoba (Spain) in 1990 by Antonio Torralba and by its musical director Miguel Hidalgo Fernández. Cinco Siglos is focused on the instrumental repertoires from the Middle Age, the Renaissance and the Baroque periods, with preference on those that combine the cultivated and popular styles.

The members of the ensemble are: Miguel Hidalgo (historical plucked strings and musical direction), Antonio Torralba (flutes), Gabriel Arellano (historical violins), José Ignacio Fernández (historical plucked strings), Daniel Sáez (historical plucked strings and Baroque cello) and Antonio Sáez (percussion).

== Discography ==
- 1995 - Unos tan dulces sones. Usos instrumentales de la Edad Media. Fonoruz CDF 204.
- 1996 - Dansse Real. Las Piezas instrumentales del Chansonnier du Roi (h. 1300). Fonoruz CDF 270.
- 1997 - Músicas de la España Mudéjar. Artes instrumentales en la Baja Edad Media. Fonoruz CDF 357.
- 1999 - Bel fiore dança. Música Instrumental del Trecento (h. 1390). Fonoruz 611.
- 2001 - Sones de Sefarad. Músicas Judías en Antiguos Instrumentos. Fonoruz 908.
- 2003 - ... una danza a sonare. Artes Instrumentales del Trecento. Fonoruz CDF 1337.
- 2003 - Iban Tañendo. Un recital de música mudéjar. Fonoruz CDF-1178
- 2006 - Glosas nuevas sobre viejas danzas. Tañidos de fama en los Siglos de Oro. Fonoruz CDF-1803
- 2008 - Sones de palacio, bailes de comedias. Gallardas, jotas, jácaras, seguidillas y fandangos con otros sones del Barroco hispánico. Fonoruz CDF-2117

== See also ==
- List of early music ensembles
