= Pro Anima =

Pro Anima was a musical ensemble from Leningrad, founded in 1977. They were specialized in medieval music. Its founder and leader was former jazz musician Gennady Golstain. They have participated in early music festivals and released some recordings on Melodiya label (USSR). The ensemble has been disbanded in 1990s.

== Members ==
- Gennady Golstain – recorder, viola da gamba
- Marina Philippova – mezzo-soprano
- Alexandre Danilevsky – lute, recorder
- Roman Kaporin – recorder
- Mikhail Ioffe – recorder
- Constantin Koucherov – viola da gamba
- Vladimir Radchenkov – harpsichord

== Discography ==
- 1980 – Late Medieval & Renaissance Music (Melodiya S10 13517/13518) [LP]
- 1983 – Sacred Music of Italy and France of the 14th - 15th Centuries (Melodiya S10 20219/20220) [LP]
- 1987 – Johannes Ciconia and his Time (Melodiya S10 26433/26434) [LP]
- 1991 – Music of the Early Italian Baroque [released on audio cassette]
