= Schola Antiqua of Chicago =

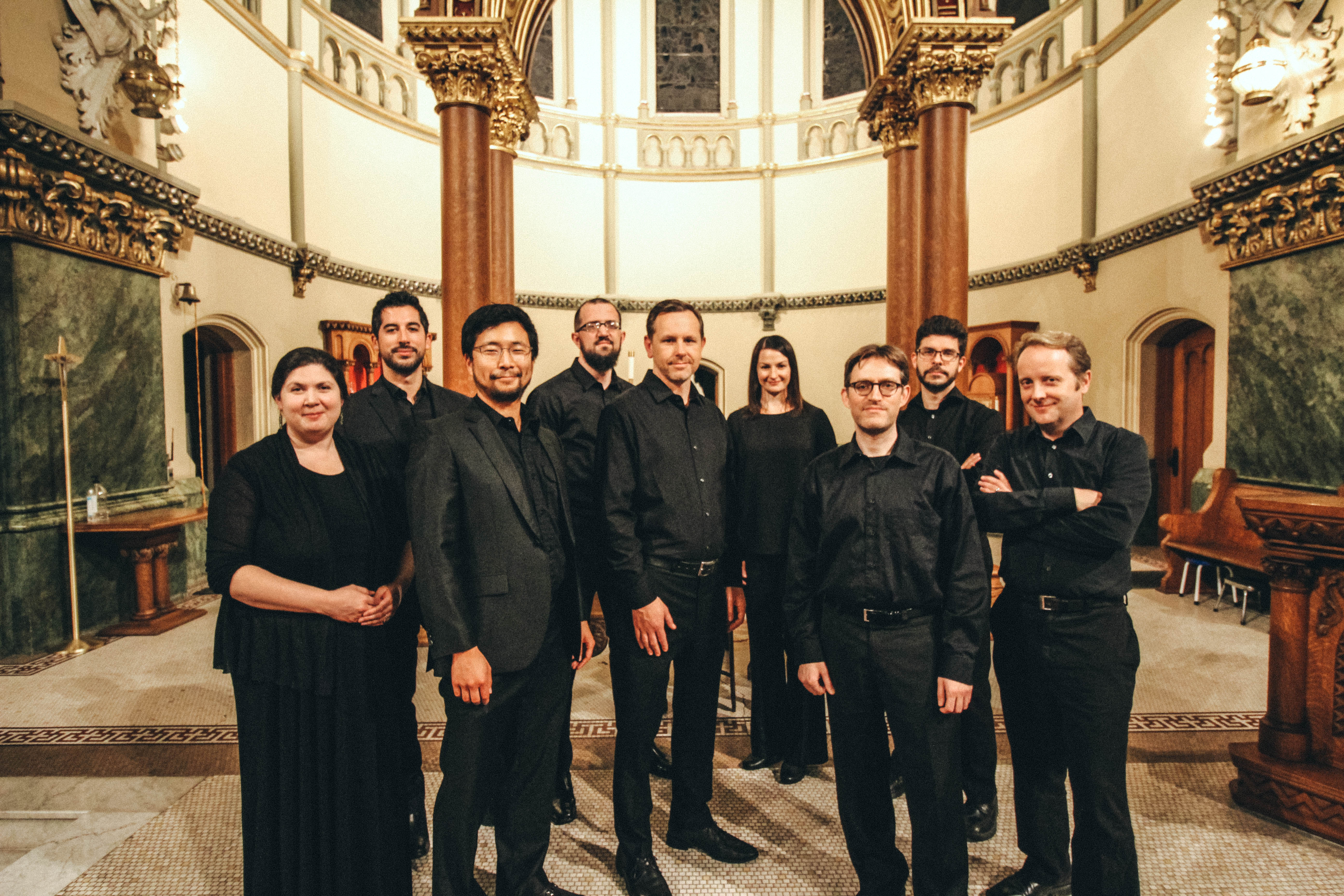
Schola Antiqua,2019

Schola Antiqua is a professional American early music ensemble based in Chicago, Illinois. The group specializes in pre-modern vocal music and is the 2012 winner of the Noah Greenberg Award from the American Musicological Society, an award that recognizes "outstanding contributions to historical performing practices." In 2006 and 2007, Schola Antiqua served as Artist in Residence at the University of Chicago, and the group currently holds an artistic residency at the Lumen Christi Institute. Schola Antiqua of Chicago performs mainly in Chicago but has also presented concerts around the United States and internationally. The choir is under the artistic direction of Michael Alan Anderson from the Eastman School of Music.

== History ==
Founded in 2000, Schola Antiqua of Chicago states that its mission is to provide audiences with the highest standards of research, performance, and education involving many under-served repertories of the European Middle Ages and Renaissance. Led by scholars in the field of early music, the organization develops programs with works that are not only seldom heard, but often newly transcribed for performance. Frequently, the ensemble presents pieces that have been the subject of academic scholarship in the field of early music.

Calvin M. Bower, Professor Emeritus of the University of Notre Dame and also a retired researcher from the Bavarian Academy of Sciences and Humanities, was the Artistic Director of Schola Antiqua from its inception until 2008. Bower specializes in the history of the medieval sequence. Consequently, Schola Antiqua's programs in the early years often included Notker's sequences and other monophonic settings. The ensemble's second Artistic Director, Michael Alan Anderson, more broadly researches the role of plainchant and polyphony in devotion, ritual, and political cultures of the late Middle Ages and Renaissance. Some of Anderson's research agenda is likewise embedded in the ensemble's past and current programming. He is the winner of Chorus America's Louis Botto Award for Innovative Action and Entrepreneurial Zeal for his work with Schola Antiqua.

Responding to the wide range of vocal forces required to sing plainchant and polyphony written before 1600, Schola Antiqua does not employ a set roster of singers for its programs. Rather it draws on a pool of professional vocal specialists in Chicago to suit the needs of each individual program. Rosters have ranged from six to ten members (male and female). The ensemble's lone venture outside the pre-1600 repertory was a collaboration in 2011 with members of two GRAMMY award-winning ensembles (eighth blackbird and Pacifica Quartet) to present a new work of sacred music by composer Jacob Bancks.

Beyond its Chicago-based concert series programming, Schola Antiqua has received invitations to perform from the Morgan Library & Museum and The Cloisters Museum in New York City, the Art Institute of Chicago, the Early Music Festival, the Indianapolis Early Music Festival, Chicago's Newberry Library, the Cathedral of St. John the Evangelist (Cleveland), the Chicago Cultural Center, the University of Chicago, the University of Notre Dame, the American Guild of Organists, and other institutions across the Midwest. Reviews of Schola Antiqua's recordings have appeared in Fanfare, Early Music America, Journal of Plainsong and Medieval Music, and Notes (Music Library Association). Their albums have aired internationally on the radio programs With Heart and Voice, Millennium of Music, and Harmonia.

Schola Antiqua maintains a close relationship with academic circles. The ensemble has recorded music for major art exhibitions and publications, including the accompanying CD for Theodore Karp's monograph Introduction to the Post-Tridentine Mass Proper, 1590-1890 (American Institute of Musicology, 2005). Margot Fassler's Music in the Medieval West (W.W. Norton, 2014) further includes several musical excerpts recorded by Schola Antiqua. As part of the Noah Greenberg Award, Schola Antiqua collaborated with University of Oregon music historian Lori Kruckenberg on a project entitled "Sounding the Neumatized Sequence," in which the ensemble recorded and archived a set of special liturgical sequences that feature melodies both with and without text (called “neumatized” sequences).

== Discography ==
Schola Antiqua of Chicago records on its own independent label known as Discantus Recordings, but also appears on the Naxos Records label with two releases (2014 and 2025). The ensemble has issued three commercial recordings on the Discantus label. Each features music that is seldom heard, let alone recorded, in the modern era. In 2009, Schola Antiqua released its first CD, Long Joy, Brief Languor: The Anonymous English Quem malignus spiritus Mass, which contains the only known recording of the Missa Quem malignus spiritus, one of the earliest "cyclic" masses known in Western music. The group's second album West Meets East was issued in 2010 and features first recordings of music from the Torino Codex, an important fifteenth-century manuscript. In 2011, the ensemble recorded The Kings of Tharsis: Medieval and Renaissance Music for Epiphany, which highlights some previously unrecorded works of Orlande de Lassus, Tomás Luis de Victoria, Guillaume Dufay, and John Sheppard.

- Notker Balbulus: Liber hymnorum (Naxos of America, 2025; Series: Early Music Collection)
- Missa Conceptio tua: Medieval and Renaissance Music for Advent (Naxos of America, 2014; Series: Early Music Collection)
- The Kings of Tharsis: Medieval and Renaissance Music for Epiphany (Discantus, 2011)
- West Meets East: Sacred Music of the Torino Codex (Discantus, 2010)
- Long Joy, Brief Languor: The Anonymous English Quem malignus spiritus Mass (Discantus, 2009)
- Accompanying CD to Introduction to the Post-Tridentine Mass Proper, 1590-1890 (American Institute of Musicology, 2005).
- Ten tracks on Margot Fassler, Music in the Medieval West (W.W. Norton, 2014).
- Fifteen tracks supplied to the exhibit "Religious Change and Print" (Newberry Library, 2017)
