= Ensemble Syntagma =

Syntagma is a vocal and instrumental ensemble performing early music, and founded by the composer and lute-player Alexandre Danilevsky.

== Awards ==
- 2011: Best Recordings of the Year: Medieval Music and Art Foundation
- 2008: Finalist for Edison Award ('Gautier d'Epinal')

- Best Recordings of the Year: MusicWebInternational and Medieval Music and Art Foundation (for 'Stylems' and 'Gautier d'Epinal')

== Recordings ==
- 2012: Alexandre Danilevsky. The Uncertainty Principle. (chamber compositions 1996 - 2012). Artists: Flanders Recorder Quartet; Larissa Groeneveld; Syntagma - Carpe Diem, D
- 2011: Rosa e Orticha (Italian Trecento) - Carpe Diem, D
- 2008: Stylems. Music from Italian Trecento - Challenge Classics, NL
- 2008: Gautier d'Epinal. Remembrance - Challenge Classics, NL
- 2004: 'Touz esforciez' Trouvères en Lorraine - Pierre Vérany, F
- 2002: Russian Baroque Music. - Pierre Vérany, F
