= Ensemble Gombert =

Ensemble Gombert is a chamber choir based in Melbourne, Australia noted for its pure intonation and historic approach to choral sound and style. The ensemble was founded and is conducted by musicologist and organist John O'Donnell in 1990. The group is named after Nicolas Gombert (c. 1495 – 1560), whose music has largely been ignored in the centuries since his death, despite it having an exemplary reputation amongst his contemporaries.

Although Ensemble Gombert performs a wide range of choral music, ranging from plainchant to contemporary works, it specialises in a cappella performance of Franco-Flemish music of the High Renaissance, that is, polyphonic music of the 16th century. The Ensemble has achieved an important place in the early music scene by re-introducing many forgotten Renaissance masterworks to the concert repertoire, using newly prepared editions by O’Donnell. These works are frequently juxtaposed in innovative programs with more widely known repertoire from later periods.

Performances in recent years have included a program of little-known works by Franco-Flemish composers Johannes Ghiselin, Jacquet of Berchem, Gaspar van Weebeke, Andreas de Silva, Nicolas Payen and Josquin des Prez, a quincentennial celebration of Thomas Tallis, the first Australian performance of Arvo Pärt's 'Canon of Repentance' (composed in 1998), works by Jean Richafort and his parodists, a program of works originally written for Charles V, Holy Roman Emperor, German Baroque masterpieces by Johann Hermann Schein, Michael Praetorius, Heinrich Schütz and Johann Sebastian Bach, Alessandro Scarlatti's 'Stabat mater', and an annual concert entitled 'Christmas to Candlemas' that presents works written for the numerous Christian feast-days in the forty-day Church season that begins on Christmas Day.

The ensemble has broadcast extensively on the Australian Broadcasting Corporation's ABC Classic radio network, as well as the Melbourne-based community arts station 3MBS. It has appeared at many festivals across Australia, including the annual Organs of the Goldfields Festival in Ballarat, and the Woodend Winter Arts Festival, has toured to the United States and Canada, and three times to Europe, and has released two CD recordings: Josquin to Martin on the Move label (2004) and Christmas to Candlemas for Tall Poppies Records (2006). The groups are mentioned regularly in the yearly critical round-up of the best classical music in Melbourne.
