= Lucie Skeaping =

British musician

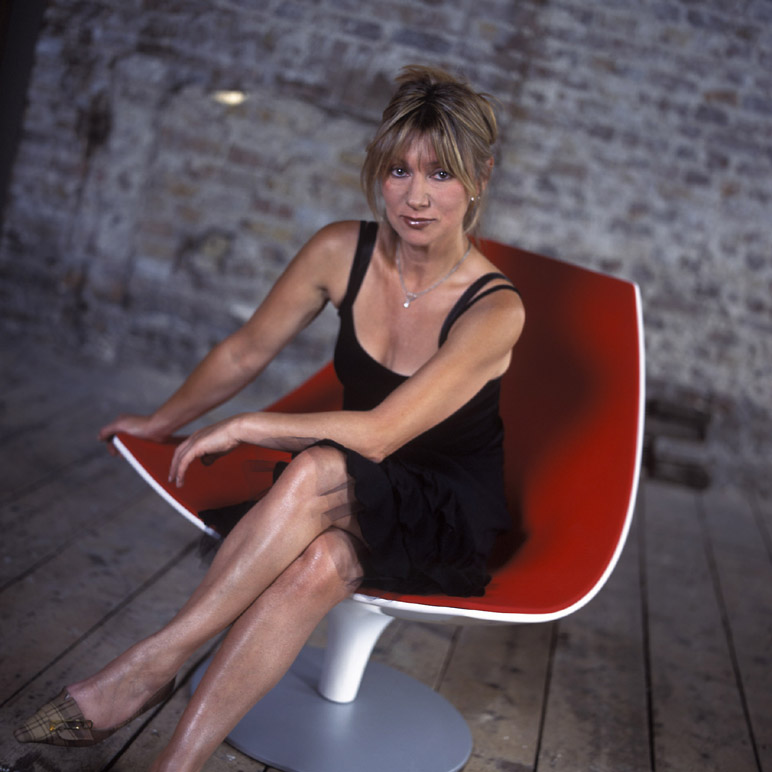

Background information
- Born: Lucie Finch
- Education: Royal College of Music
- Genre: Classical
- Occupations: Singer; instrumentalist; broadcaster; writer
- Website: www.lucieskeaping.co.uk

Lucie Skeaping (née Finch) is a British singer, instrumentalist, broadcaster and writer. She was a founder of the early music group the City Waites and the pioneering klezmer band the Burning Bush. She presents BBC Radio 3's Early Music Show, a weekly programme dedicated to the early music repertoire.

== Early life ==
Skeaping was born in London, England the daughter of GP Dr Bernard Finch and the sculptor Patricia Finch, Skeaping studied at the Henrietta Barnett School, the Arts Educational School and King Alfred School before she began her training at the Royal College of Music as a violinist (with Sylvia Rosenberg) and singer (with Helga Mott), later studying the lute (with Diana Poulton) and the viol. After graduation she joined the City Waites, a four-piece group specialising in the broadside ballads and popular songs and dance music of 17th-century England.

== Career ==
During the 1980s, Skeaping worked as a children's television presenter for BBC programmes including Play School, The Music Arcade for BBC Schools (alongside Tim Whitnall), Take Two, Get Set For Summer, and, for Channel 4, the long-running 'Make Music Fun'. As a member of the Michael Nyman Band, she appeared in Peter Greenaway's 1980 mock documentary The Falls, as subject #74, Pollie Fallory, and in Gavin Bryars' Irma. After several years performing with the proto-feminist band the Sadista Sisters, she returned to early music working with the City Waites, the Consort of Musicke, the Martin Best Ensemble and the English Consort of Viols before forming her own band the Burning Bush in order to explore her own Jewish roots.

Skeaping is a specialist exponent of the English broadside ballad repertoire and the popular dance tunes to which they were sung, also playing baroque violin, fiddle and rebec. Her involvement with this often profane repertoire led to The Daily Telegraph describing her as "the bawdy babe of Radio 3" in 2004.

As a solo artist and with her groups she has toured extensively and made recordings for Saydisc, Hyperion, ARC Music International, Regis, EMI and Decca (details at www.lucieskeaping.co.uk/cds.htm). Her collaborations with other performers, broadcasters, theatre companies, historians and film-makers include the Royal National Theatre, Jools Holland, the Rambert Dance Company, the Regents Park Open Air Theatre, Simon Schama, Waldemar Januszczak, Michael Nyman, Shakespeare's Globe, the RSC, John Harle, Dominic Muldowney, Ken Dodd and Roman Polanski.

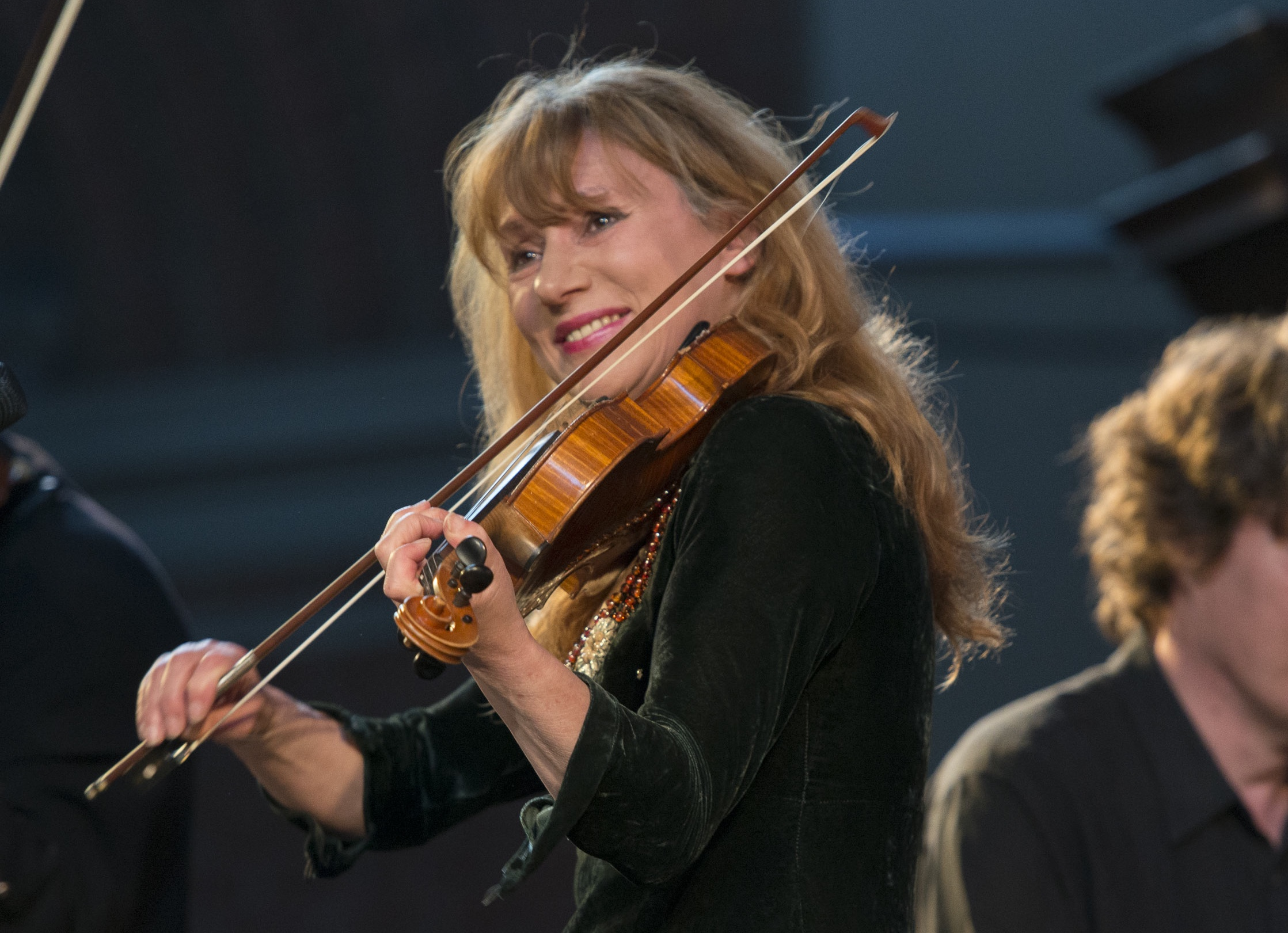
In concert with the Burning Bush

Skeaping has written and presented numerous music-documentaries for BBC radio on subjects including Samuel Pepys, ballad opera, Henry VIII and the Mary Rose, the Dolmetsch family, the history of the Sephardi Jews, Nell Gwyn and the Restoration, and broadside ballads.

She is co-author (with Dr Roger Clegg) of Singing Simpkin and other Bawdy Jigs: Musical Comedy on the Shakespearean Stage (UEP 2014), an edition of nine 'dramatic jigs' from the Tudor and Stuart period, many reunited with their original music for the first time in 400 years. Her other books are Broadside Ballads (Faber Music 2006), Winner of the Music Industry Association Award for Best Classical Music Book 2006; Let's Make Tudor Music (Stainer and Bell 1999), runner-up TES Best Primary schools music Book; and the recorder anthology Who gave thee thy Jolly Red Nose (Peacock Press 2008). She has contributed articles for the BBC Music Magazine, Early Music Today, BBC History Magazine, History Today, Financial Times and others.

Skeaping is Ambassador and a member of the judging panel for 'Live Music Now' (promoting young performers), Patron of the Finchley Children’s Music Group, and a member of the Samuel Pepys Club.

== Personal life ==
She married Roderick (Roddy) Skeaping and thereafter adopted his surname for professional purposes. The couple have a son called William who works in the music industry.
