= Voices of Music =

American ensemble of early music (founded 2007)

- Ensemble
- Voices of Music in 2022
- Short name: VOM
- Founded: 2007
- Location: San Francisco, California, U.S.
- Music director: Hanneke van Proosdij; David Tayler
- Website: voicesofmusic.org

Voices of Music (VOM) is an American nonprofit musical ensemble based in San Francisco, California and founded in 2007. It specializes in the performance of early music, especially Renaissance music, and Baroque compositions, using historically informed musical performance practices and instrumentation.

== History ==
Voices of Music was founded in 2007 by the artistic co-directors and musician-scholars Hanneke van Proosdij and David Tayler. The ensemble performs music by Johann Sebastian Bach, Arcangelo Corelli, Claudio Monteverdi, Georg Philipp Telemann, and Antonio Vivaldi, among others. Through its website and social media, the group provides free and easy access to information and related materials about their concerts and recordings (including those on CD Baby) to the public.

== Mission ==
According to their mission statement, the goal of Voices of Music is to offer the following: "concerts and recordings of music composed before 1800, affordable educational programs for children and adults, advanced training for the next generation of young professionals and community outreach [as well as to provide] music of the highest quality in live performances [and to] introduce new audiences of all ages to the world of early classical music".

== Recognition ==
Voices of Music is distinguished as the first early music group to broadcast their concerts in high-definition video over the internet, providing the worldwide public with numerous free to share concerts. The group has won several awards, including the Best of the Bay award and the Laurette Goldberg Award for outstanding outreach and educational projects. Reviews of musical performances by the ensemble have been presented by many. According to the San Francisco Classical Voice, Voices of Music is "splendidly colorful and imaginative", and, as presented in Early Music Today (UK), "early music marvels". The music performances of Voices of Music are considered "of historic, national significance". Voices of Music has been regarded as "the most popular early music ensemble in the United States, and one of the most popular music ensembles of any kind in the world today".

== See also ==
- Early music revival
- List of early music ensembles § United States
