= Renaissance Street Singers =

American choir

- Choir
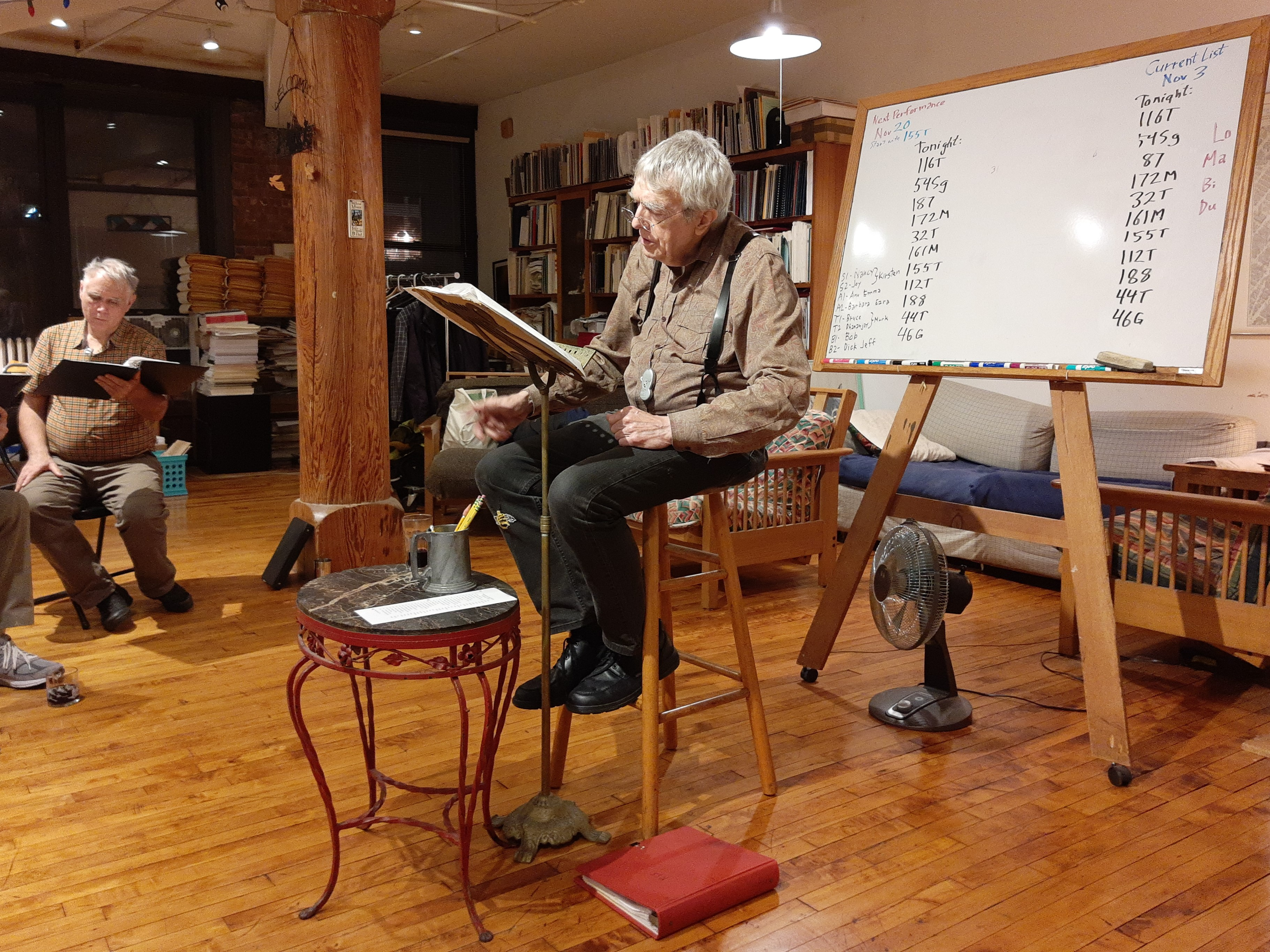
- Hetland conducting a rehearsal in 2022
- Origin: New York City
- Founded: 1973
- Genre: a cappella Renaissance music
- Chief conductor: John Hetland
- Website: www.streetsingers.org

The Renaissance Street Singers is a New York City-based amateur choir that performs polyphonic sacred music a cappella in free concerts in public spaces of the city. It was founded in 1973 by John Hetland, who remains the conductor and also prepares the music.

== History ==
John Hetland, a resident of Manhattan, founded the Renaissance Street Singers in 1973 as a group of amateur singers willing to perform music of the Renaissance in free concerts on open places of New York City on a regular basis. They focus on unaccompanied polyphonic sacred music.

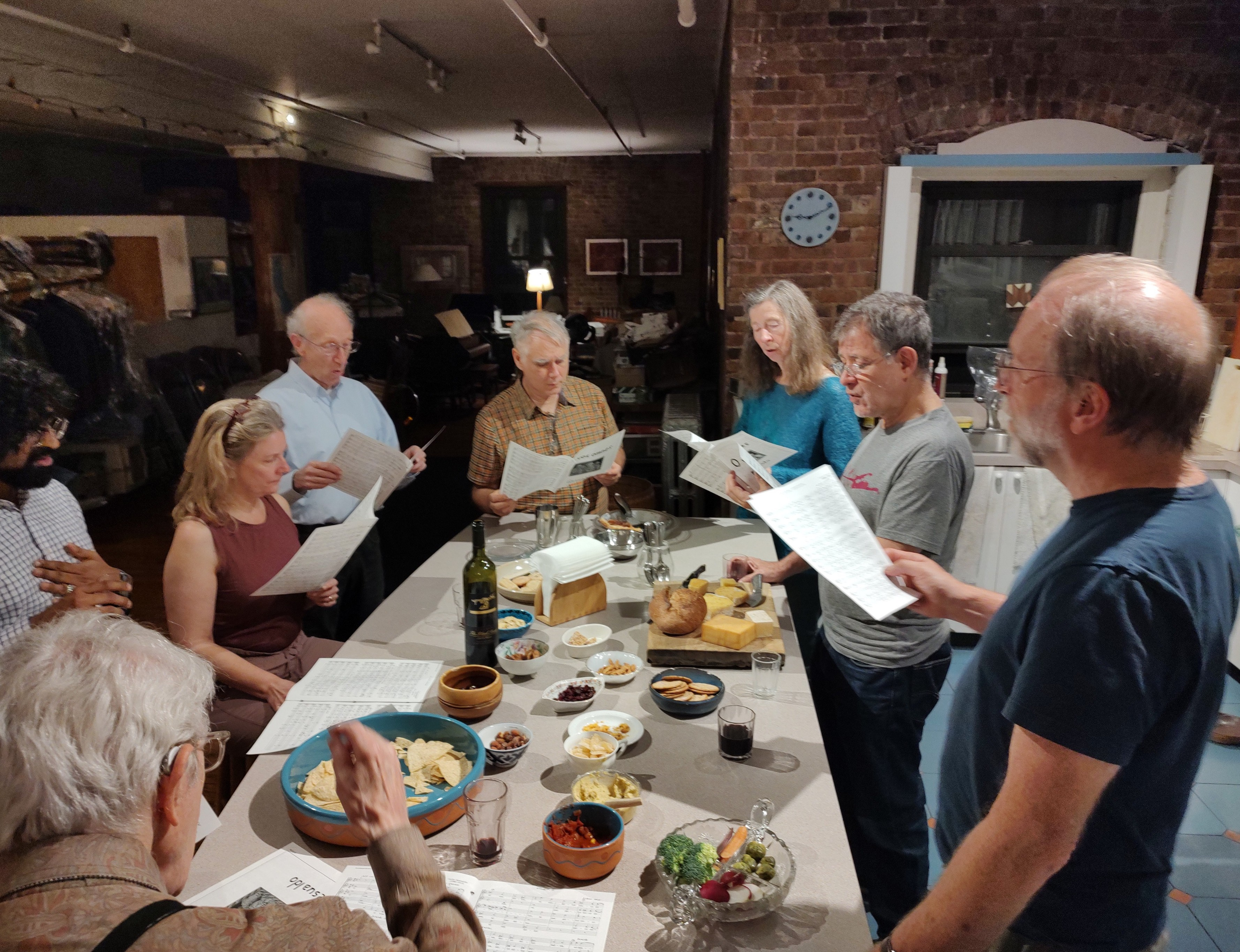
Singers after rehearsing at the conductor's residence

The group consists of about 25 people who love this kind of music and who wish to share it by singing for passers-by. They rehearse at the conductor's home, and perform in public spaces and street corners around the city. In cold weather, they often perform in Grand Central Station. Despite the religious origin of the music, the performances are given without religious message. Concerts are normally on Sunday afternoons, two or sometimes three times a month, always free. Donations offered by listeners are politely refused.

The music performed, primarily from the 15th and 16th centuries, is a slowly changing list of motets, mass sections, and other sacred compositions, by composers such as Guillaume Dufay, Johannes Ockeghem, Josquin des Prez, Giovanni Pierluigi da Palestrina, William Byrd, Tomás Luis de Victoria, Nicolas Gombert, and Manuel Cardoso. The music is mostly taken from Complete Works of ... volumes in the Performing Arts Research Library of the New York Public Library. Hetland transfers a photocopy of a chosen piece to a computer, translating the usually Latin text and fitting the words to the music. Sometimes this involves transposing the music to a suitable key.

In 2013, the choir was featured on National Public Radio's program "All Things Considered".
