= Insula Magica =

Russian early music ensemble

- Origin: Novosibirsk, Russia
- Genres: Early music
- Years active: 1981–present
- Members: Arkady Burkhanov; Elena Kondratova; Alexey Bazhenov; Ivan Tkachenko; Anna Nedospasova; Yulia Gaikolova; Sergey Adamenko

Insula Magica is a musical collective from Novosibirsk, Russia. The ensemble recreates early music.

== History ==
In 1981, a group of students of the Novosibirsk Conservatory founded the musical collective. They were united by the idea of reconstruction of early music.

In September 2009, the ensemble represented Russian culture in Stockholm at the 'Vox Pacis' International Festival. In October 2009, the Insula Magica and the Swedish ensemble Laude Novella conducted tour of the 'Echoes from Poltava'. it started in Novosibirsk and ended in the Poltava Field.

== Repertoire ==
Old Russian chants, religious and secular musical works of the West European Middle Ages, Renaissance and Baroque music, music of the era of Peter the Great, Russian songs of the 18th century, the music of Bach, Handel, Pretorius, etc.

== Musical instruments ==
The collective uses original old instruments and their copies.

== Members ==
- Arkady Burkhanov – ensemble leader, guitars, theorbo, wind instruments, lute
- Elena Kondratova – soprano
- Alexey Bazhenov – tenor
- Ivan Tkachenko – baritone
- Anna Nedospasova – harpsichord, clavichord, pipe organ, recorder
- Yulia Gaikolova – baroque violin
- Sergey Adamenko – lute, guitar

== Antique collection ==
The ensemble members collected ancient manuscripts, musical documents, ancient musical instruments and costumes of different historical periods.
