= Guido Morini =

Italian composer (born 1959)

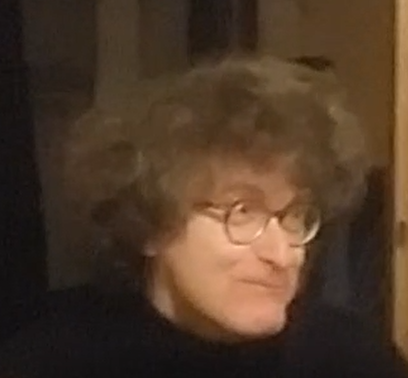
Image of Guido Morini

Guido Morini (born in Milan in 1959) is an Italian pianist, organist, harpsichordist, musicologist and composer.

In the ensemble Accordone he performs early baroque works with singer Marco Beasley. Beasley is also the librettist for his Una Odissea, composed in 2001. His cycle Vivifice Spiritus Vitae Vis 2005, is composed on texts from the Vulgate Latin Bible.

== Discography ==
Own compositions or arrangements

- Improvisando - Il jazz del Cinquecento. Paolo Pandolfo, Guido Morini, Thomas Boysen et al. GCD P30409 (Glossa)
- Una Odissea (Marco Beasley, Guido Morini - Accordone & Netherlands Wind Ensemble) (2002, NBELive)
- Vivifice spiritus vitae vis ("Servabo") (Marco Beasley, Guido Morini - Accordone) (2004, Cypres)
- Una Iliade (Marco Beasley, Guido Morini - Netherlands Wind Ensemble & Hilliard Ensemble) (2009, NBELive)

Performance of early music

- Accordone - "Via Toledo" – Tarantelle e Canzoni alla Napolitana. ORF
- Accordone I Vox clamans ORF
- Accordone II L'Amore Ostinato ORF
- Accordone III Il sogno ORF
- Accordone IV Surprise ORF
- Trigonale 2003. Accordone (Alfio Antico, Marco Beasley, Guido Morini). ORF Edition Alte Musik, ORF-CD 364.
- Il salotto Napolitane Accordone ORF
- Su Leva, alza le ciglia! Frottole, Accordone. Live Festival "Italia Mia” ORF
- Simone Balsamino, Novellette e Madrigali. Diego Fasolis, Vanitas Ensemble, Guido Morini,(Dynamic)
- La Bella Noeva (Marco Beasley, Guido Morini - Accordone) (2003, Alpha)
- Le Frottole (Marco Beasley, Guido Morini - Accordone) (2005, Cypres)
- Recitar Cantando (Marco Beasley, Guido Morini - Accordone) (2006, Cypres)
- Il settecento Napoletano (Marco Beasley, Guido Morini - Accordone) (2007, Cypres)
- Fra' Diavolo (Marco Beasley, Guido Morini, Pino de Vittorio - Accordone) (2010, Arcana)
- Cantate Deo (a due tenori) (Marco Beasley / Guido Morini / Accordone) (2013, Alpha)
- Vivifice spiritus vitae vis (Marco Beasley / Guido Morini / Accordone) (2014, Cypres)
