= The City Waites =

British ensemble

The City Waites were a British early music ensemble. Formed in the early 1970s, they specialise in English music of the 16th and 17th centuries from the street, tavern, theatre and countryside — the music of ordinary people. They endeavour to appeal to a wide general audience as well as to scholars. They have toured the UK, much of Europe, the Middle East, the Far East and the USA, performing everywhere from major concert halls and universities to village squares. Collaborations include the National Theatre, the Royal Shakespeare Company and Shakespeare's Globe. They can be heard on several movie and TV soundtracks; they broadcast frequently and have made more than 30 CDs.

== Members ==
Members included Lucie Skeaping, Douglas Wootton, Roddy Skeaping, Nicholas Perry, and Michael Brain

The Skeapings and/or Douglas Wootton were core of a constantly changing line-up. Musicians who have worked with the group previously include:

- Joe Skeaping - woodwinds/violin
- Keith Thompson - woodwinds
- Barbara Grant - soprano, violin
- Nicholas Hayley - bass viol
- Robin Jeffrey - lute
- Richard Wistreich - baritone
- Graham Wells - woodwinds

== Discography ==
- The English Stage Jig (Hyperion) - released March 9
- The English Tradition (ARC)
- Low and Lusty Ballads (Regis)
- Penny Merriments (Naxos)
- Bawdy Ballads of Old England (Regis, 1995) formerly the Mufitians of Grope Lane (Musica Oscura)
- Christmas Now is Drawing Near (Saydisc) CD-SDL 371
- How the World Wags (Hyperion, 1981) A 66008
- Pills to Purge Melancholy (Saydisc, 1990) CD-SDL 382
- The Music of the Tudor Age
- Music of the Middle Ages
- Music of the Stuart Age
- Music from the Time of Henry VIII
- Music from the Time of Charles II
- A Madrigal for All Seasons

=== On LP ===
- The City Waites (Decca, 1976) SKL 5264
- A Gorgeous Gallery of Gallant Inventions (EMI, 1974) EMC 3017
