= Solistes de Musique Ancienne =

Solistes de Musique Ancienne, also known as Solistes, is a London-based ensemble specialising in Baroque music.

Founded in 2010 by conductor Joel Newsome, it draws its members from London conservatoires and young professional classical musicians at the start of their careers. It performs as both an orchestra and choir, together or separately, using minimal force in performance, and often with one musician per part. Soloists are provided from within the group rather than by external invitation.

They played their first concert in St James's Church, Piccadilly in October 2010, with Handel's rarely heard "Ode for the Birthday of Queen Anne" and Bach's "Brandenburg Concerto no.2". In March 2011 they performed Bach's Easter Oratorio and Allegri's "Miserere" at Holy Trinity, Sloane Street.
