= Retrospect Ensemble =

Retrospect Ensemble was a British period music orchestra, chamber ensemble and choir which was in existence between May 2009 and December 2014.

== History ==
The name "Retrospect Ensemble" was adopted in May 2009 by the trustees for the musical charity then known as "The King's Consort", which had been set up in 1992. To coincide with the charity's new identity, a new performing group, Retrospect Ensemble, was launched in May 2009. Full details surrounding the necessity to found the new group are given in the article on The King's Consort. The founding artistic director was Matthew Halls, a conductor and harpsichordist who had played with Amsterdam Baroque Orchestra, Les Arts Florissants, the Orchestra of the Age of Enlightenment, the Academy of Ancient Music, the Theatre of Early Music, Montreal and the New York Collegium. Retrospect Ensemble gave its debut performance on 1 May 2009 with Handel's Jeptha at the Norwich and Norfolk Festival.

In 2013, Justin Doyle was appointed as artistic director.

== Performances and recordings ==
Between 2009 and 2014, Retrospect Ensemble performed at the Edinburgh Festival, at London's Wigmore Hall, and toured to Korea, Israel and Portugal. The group had set out to perform in various configurations including orchestra, choir and chamber ensemble, and worked with soloists including Robin Blaze, James Gilchrist, Gillian Keith, and Carolyn Sampson. The Retrospect Trio focussed on the repertoire of the 17th and 18th century trio sonata and made two recordings of music by Purcell for Linn Records. Their first CD, Henry Purcell: 10 Sonatas in four parts, was released in May 2009.

== Closure ==
In December 2014, Retrospect Ensemble was wound up by its Trustees, who stated that "the continued operation of the ensemble is no longer economically viable and accordingly will need to cease operation".

== Recordings ==
- Purcell: Ten Sonatas in Four Parts (Retrospect Trio) Linn CKD332
- Purcell: Twelve Sonatas of Three Parts (Retrospect Trio) Linn CKD374
