= G. A. P. Ensemble =

The G. A. P. Ensemble, short for Giovanni Antonio Piani Ensemble, is a classical music ensemble based in Germany. It was founded by the Macedonian violinist Emilio Percan, the Catalan cellist Oriol Aymat-Fusté and the Italian harpsichordist Luca Quintavalle in 2011.

== Discography ==
- 2012 Affettuoso - sonatas for violin and continuo by Giovanni Antonio Piani, Handel and Francesco Geminiani
- 2014 I Musicisti dell' Imperatore - cantatas for soprano, violin and continuo, and violin sonatas by Alessandro Scarlatti, Antonio Caldara, Antonio Vivaldi and Giovanni Antonio Piani
- 2016 Vivaldi Per Pisendel - five violin sonatas by Vivaldi "Facto Per Monsieur Pisendel"

== Awards ==
In September 2012, the ensemble received the "CD of the Month" distinction for their debut recording Affettuoso by the musicweb.international. Their recording Vivaldi per Pisendel received the "5 de Diapason" award in November 2016.
