= Texas Early Music Project =

The Texas Early Music Project
- Origin: Austin, Texas
- Genres: Baroque, medieval, Renaissance
- Years active: 1987 - present
- Website: early-music.org

The Texas Early Music Project is a performing arts ensemble based in Austin, Texas, that focuses on bringing audiences a closer knowledge and appreciation of Baroque music, Medieval music, Renaissance music, and early Classical-period music. The group uses historical instruments in keeping with historically informed performance practice. The ensemble was founded in 1987 by Daniel Johnson, who remains the group's artistic director. The group is classified as a non-profit organization (501(c)(3)) and operates primarily on grant money and donations for individual and corporate supporters. Income is supplemented by ticket sales and merchandise sales. Texas Early Music Project is a member of Early Music America. Performers are primarily professional musicians from the Austin area, although performers visit from Texas at large, from all over the United States, and occasionally internationally.

== History ==
The Texas Early Music project was initially conceived of as an opportunity for student members of The University of Texas at Austin Early Music Ensemble to work and perform with professional musicians, allowing them to explore a wider repertoire and gain performance experience. Over the years, growing popularity and an increased awareness of early music have led to the group's establishment as a prominent presence in the Austin music community, and the group regularly hosts performances in the Austin area at several different venues.

== Performances ==
Between 1995 and 2002, TEMP's orchestra performed in several productions with the UT Opera Theater, including Purcell's Dido and Aeneas, "Baroque and Loving It" (a pastiche of selections from the works of Lully, Rameau, Cavalli, Cesti, and others, arranged by conductor Daniel Johnson), Cavalli's L'Ormindo, Monteverdi's Coronation of Poppea, and Handel's Alcina and Rinaldo. TEMP has performed at the Early Music Weekend at Round Top Festival Institute, appears regularly at the Texas Early Music Festival in Palestine, Texas, and contributed a performance to the Mostly Music Marathon (benefiting AIDS Services of Austin).

In 1998, TEMP became a member of the Austin Circle of Theaters (now the Austin Creative Alliance) and initiated its Midwinter Festival of Music (1998–2002), a series of unique concerts and operas performed over six successive weekends. Local performers and guests from Europe and Canada came together for performances of Handel's Rinaldo and Alcina, Purcell's King Arthur, and other works from the diverse early music repertoire ranging from Hildegard of Bingen's chants to Sephardic love songs to lieder by Schubert and Beethoven.

Since 2003, TEMP has offered audiences a concert season between the months of September and May. Many concert programs are brought back by popular demand in successive seasons, including "Convivencia: The Three Worlds of Spain" (repeated in 2004, 2005, and 2010) and "The Play of Daniel" (repeated 2003-2005).

More recently, in 2012, the ensemble performed Hildegard of Bingen's Ordo Virtutum to a sold-out concert hall in downtown Austin.

== Awards and honors ==
- 2006- Austin Critic's Table - Best Choral Concert for "Monteverdi's Vespers of the Blessed Virgin, 1610"
- 2005- Austin Critic's Table - Best Choral Concert for "Pathways to Bach"
- 2003- Austin Critic's Table - Best Chamber Concert for "Veris Dulcis"
- 2011- Austin Critic's Table - Best Chamber Concert for "Convivencia: Worlds of Renaissance Spain"

== Past and Current Performers ==
- Laurie Young Stevens, violin, concertmistress
- Abby Green, mezzo-soprano, bouzouki, percussion
- Allison Welch, oboe, alto
- Annette Bauer, winds, percussion
- Becky Baxter, harp
- Boel Gidholm, Baroque violin & viola, vielle
- Brent Baldwin, baritone
- Brett Barnes, baritone
- Brian Pettey, baritone
- Bruce Brogdon, lute, theorbo, guitars
- Bruce Colson, violin
- Cayla Cardiff, mezzo-soprano
- Christopher Haritatos, Baroque cello
- Christopher LeCluyse, tenor
- David Dawson, bass
- David Lopez, tenor
- David Stevens, tenor
- Elaine Barber, harp
- Gil Zilkha, bass-baritone
- Gitanjali Mathur, soprano
- Heidi Hock Kaim, soprano
- James Brown, viola da gamba
- Jane Leggiero, viola da gamba, Baroque cello
- Jeffrey Jones-Ragona, tenor
- Jim Garrison, percussion
- Joel Nesvadba, tenor
- Jonathan Brumley, lute, keyboard
- Jonathan Nesvadba, baritone
- Jonathan Riemer, tenor
- John Walters, viola da gamba, Baroque cello, mandola, vielle, rebec
- Jos Milton, tenor
- Julie Silva, mezzo-soprano, percussion
- Kamran Hooshmand, oud, santur
- Karen Burciaga, violin, vielle, viola da gamba
- Kathlene Ritch, soprano
- Keith Womer, keyboard
- Kit Robberson, vielle, viola da gamba
- Larisa Montanaro, mezzo-soprano
- Lisa Alexander, mezzo-soprano
- Meredith Ruduski, soprano
- Peter Lohman, tenor
- Philip Baker, organ, bass
- Rebecca Muniz, soprano
- Scott Horton, lute, theorbo, guitar, oud
- Stephanie Prewitt, mezzo-soprano
- Steven Olivares, bass
- Susan Richter, alto, recorders, shawm
- Temmo Korisheli, tenor
- Therese Honey, harp
- Tom Zajac, shawm, sackbut, bagpipe, recorder, percussion

== Recordings ==
The Texas Early Music Project often release recordings of their live performances. Listed below are several notable examples from their diverse catalogue.

- 1999- The Bonny Broom and Other Scottish Ballads (Professional studio recording)
- 2005- The Play of Daniel - A 12th Century Mystery Play
- 2005- Convivencia - Worlds of Renaissance Spain
- 2005- Pathways to Bach - Music in Germany in the 17th Century
- 2007- Celtic Knot - Scottish, Irish, and Breton Music from the 15th-20th Centuries
- 2007- Paris City Limits - Chansons and Dances by Janequin, Josquin, and Others
- 2010- Stella Splendens - An Early Christmas Music
- 2010- Night and Day - Sephardic Songs of Love and Exile
