= Carlos Serrano =

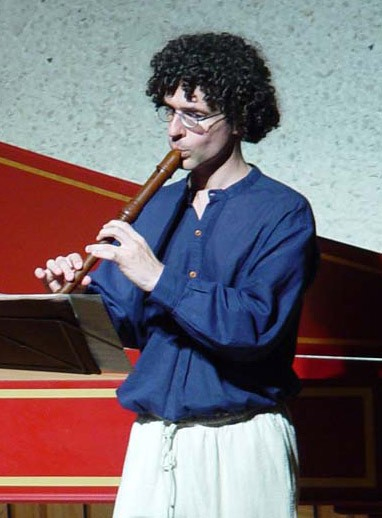

Background information
- Born: Carlos Serrano; 1963 (age 61–62); Bogotá, D.C., Colombia
- Genres: Baroque music, Renaissance music
- Instrument: Recorder
- Labels: Jade, Centaur, Arts Music, Arion, Etcetera, Lindoro
- Website: http://www.musicaficta.com/

Carlos Serrano (born August 29, 1963, in Bogotá, Colombia) is a recorder and early woodwinds player. He completed high school studies at Colegio San Carlos in Bogotá. After studying recorder at Oberlin Conservatory in Ohio and Mannes College of Music in New York with Philip Levin, and with Pedro Memelsdorff in Italy, he graduated from the Early Music Institute at Indiana University as pupil of Eva Legene and Michael McCraw. In 1988 he founded the early music ensemble Musica Ficta (Colombia), with which he has specialized in the performance of Latin-American and Spanish renaissance and baroque music. With this ensemble he has performed in Europe, the Americas, the Far and Middle East. He has recorded for the labels Jade (France), Arion (France), Centaur (USA), Arts Music (Germany), Etcetera (Belgium) and Lindoro (Spain). He taught music at Pontificia Universidad Javeriana in Bogotá.

== Discography ==
- "Romances & Villancicos from Spain and the New World". Éditions Jade No. 198-142-2 (France). 1996, p. 2001.
- "De Antequera sale un moro" - Music of the Christian, Moorish and Jewish Spain c. 1492. Éditions Jade No. 74321-79256-2 (France). 1999, p. 2000.
- "Sepan todos que muero" - Music of Peasants and Courtiers in the Viceroyalty of Peru, 17th-18th c.. Centaur Records CRC 2797 (USA). 2003, p. 2006.
- "Esa noche yo bailá" - Feast and Devotion in High Peru of the 17th Century . Arts Music No. 47727-8 (Germany). 2005, p. 2006.
- "Del mar del alma" - Music and Poetry in Colonial Bogota (17th-18th c.). Arion ARN68789 (France). 2007, p. 2008.
- "Cuando muere el sol" - Art Songs by Sebastián Durón (1660-1716) . Arion ARN68825 (France). 2010, p. 2011.
- "Dos estrellas le siguen" - 17th Century Xácaras and Dances in Spain and Latin America. Centaur Records CRC 3501 (USA). 2015, p. 2016
- "Aves, flores y estrellas" - Tonos and arias by Juan de Navas (1647-1719) . Lindoro NL-3037 (Belgium). 2016, p. 2017.
- "Alado cisne de nieve" - Art songs by Juan de Navas (1647-1719) . Etcetera KTC 1609 (Belgium). 2016, p. 2018.
- "En mi amor tal ausencia" - Love and heartbreak in the tonos of José Marín (1618-1699) . Lindoro NL-3046 (Spain). 2018, p. 2020.
- "Si a la muerte imita el sueño" - Art songs by José Marín (1618-1699) . Lindoro NL-3053 (Spain). 2018, p. 2021.
