= Giulio Cesare Rubino =

Italian composer

Giulio Cesare Rubino (fl. 17th and 18th centuries) was an Italian composer of whom little biographical information is known. His surviving compositions include a psalm Confitebor and some secular cantatas. One cantata Oh cielo, oh ammore was composed for lady Clelia Caracciolo, marchioness of Arena. The cantata Lena was recorded by Marco Beasley.
