= Jin Kim (violinist) =

Jin Kim is a South Korean Baroque violinist.

A native of Seoul, she studied in Seoul National University's Department of Music, and then came to the United States to study at the University of Michigan under Ruggiero Ricci. She learned baroque violin from Sigiswald Kuijken, a Belgian violinist and conductor noted for authentic instruments, and has performed in Europe, the United States and Japan. Currently, she devotes herself to the promotion of early music in South Korea.

She has worked with the period instrument ensemble La Petite Bande. As a founder, she has been leading Musica Glorifica since 2002.

== Instruments ==
Jin Kim currently plays a violin made in Absam in 1656 by Jacob Stainer.

== Recordings ==
- Handel – Sonatas For Violin & Basso Continuo, with Musica Glorificaa (2007)
- Psalms for you – 17th century Italian music, with Musica Glorifica (2002)
- Bach – St Matthew Passion BWV 244, with La Petite Bande (2010) Challenge Classics
- Bach – Cantatas, BWV 13 – 73 – 81 – 144, with La Petite Bande (2008) ACCENT

== Sources ==
- Jin Kim at MusicaGlorifica.com
- Jin Kim at JinKimViolin.com
