= Música Ficta (Colombian ensemble) =

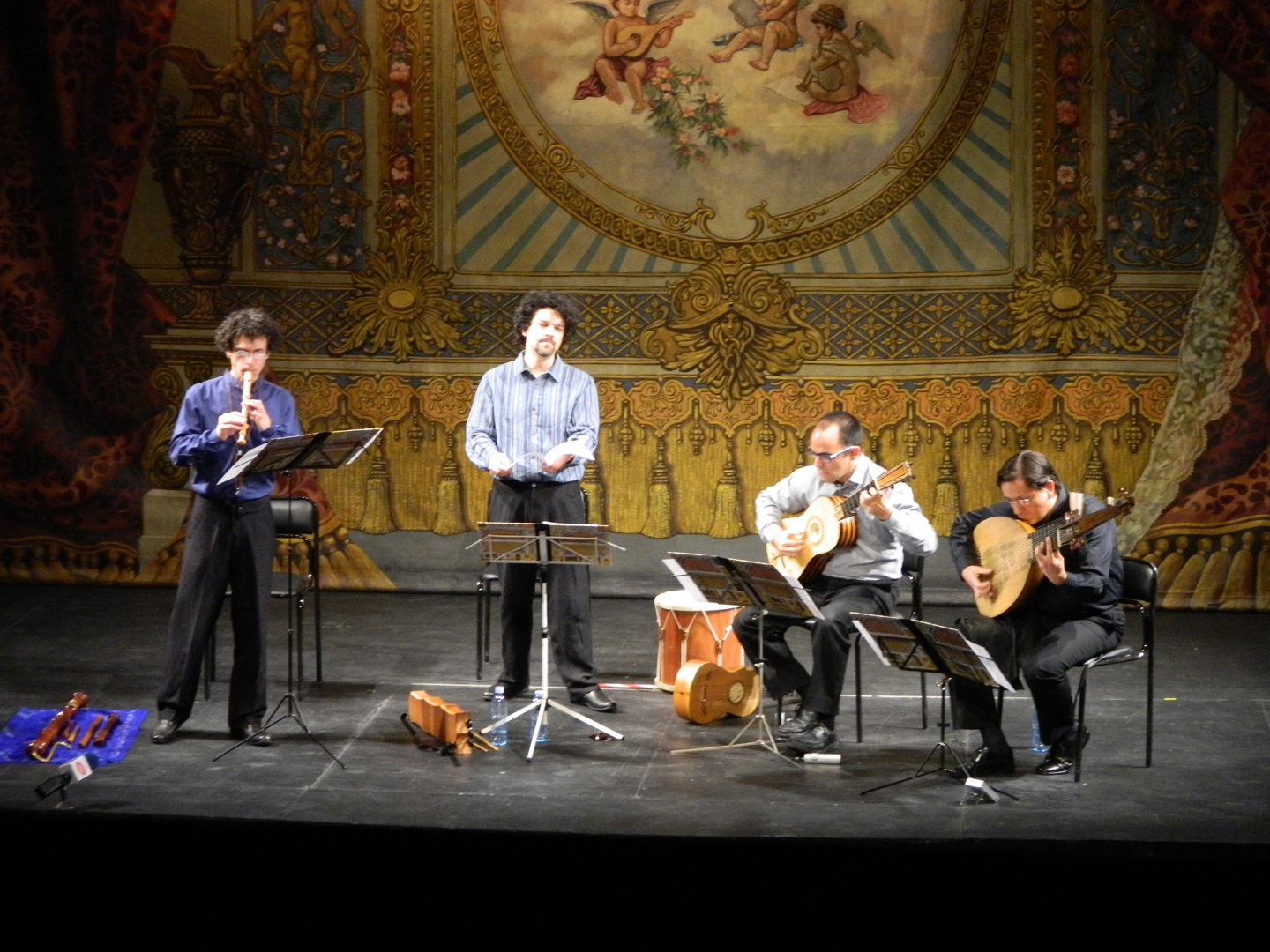

Background information
- Origin: Bogotá, Colombia
- Genres: Baroque music, Renaissance music
- Occupations: Early music
- Years active: 1988–present
- Members: Carlos Serrano, Jairo Serrano, Elisabeth Wright, Julián Navarro, Regina Albanez, Bárbara Cerón, Edwin García, Andrés Silva
- Website: www.musicaficta.com

Música Ficta is an early music ensemble founded in Bogotá, Colombia, in 1988. The ensemble is specialized in the performance of Latin-American and Spanish renaissance and baroque music. It has performed in Europe, the Americas, the Far and Middle East, and it has been reviewed, among others, by The Washington Post, Goldberg Magazine, Fanfare, AllMusic and Le Monde de la Musique.

The ensemble has recorded various unedited or scarcely known pieces from Latin-American musical archives, such as Bogotá, Mexico, Guatemala, Lima and Chiquitos (Bolivia). The group has also uncovered unedited pieces by 17th-century Spanish composers such as Sebastián Durón, Juan de Navas and José Marín.

Current members of the group are: Jairo Serrano (voice, percussion), Carlos Serrano (early woodwinds), Elisabeth Wright (harpsichord), Julián Navarro (baroque guitar), Regina Albanez (theorbo), Bárbara Cerón (baroque harp), Edwin García (theorbo), Andrés Silva (voice).

== Discography ==
- "Romances & Villancicos from Spain and the New World". Éditions Jade No. 198-142-2 (France). 1996, p. 2001
- "De Antequera sale un moro" - Music of the Christian, Moorish and Jewish Spain c. 1492. Éditions Jade No. 74321-79256-2 (France). 1999, p. 2000
- "Sepan todos que muero" - Music of Peasants and Courtiers in the Viceroyalty of Peru, 17th-18th c. . Centaur Records CRC 2797 (USA). 2003, p. 2006
- "Esa noche yo bailá" - Feast and Devotion in High Peru of the 17th Century . Arts Music No. 47727-8 (Germany). 2005, p. 2006
- "Del mar del alma" - Music and Poetry in Colonial Bogota (17th-18th c.). Arion ARN68789 (France). 2007, p. 2008
- "Cuando muere el sol" - Art Songs by Sebastián Durón (1660-1716) . Arion ARN68825 (France). 2010, p. 2011
- "Dos estrellas le siguen" - 17th Century Xácaras and Dances in Spain and Latin America. Centaur Records CRC 3501 (USA). 2015, p. 2016
- "Aves, flores y estrellas" - Tonos and arias by Juan de Navas (1647-1719) . Lindoro NL-3037 (Belgium). 2016, p. 2017.
- "Alado cisne de nieve" - Art songs by Juan de Navas (1647-1719) . Etcetera KTC 1609 (Belgium). 2016, p. 2018.
- "En mi amor tal ausencia" - Love and heartbreak in the tonos of José Marín (1618-1699) . Lindoro NL-3046 (Spain). 2018, p. 2020.
- "Si a la muerte imita el sueño" - Art songs by José Marín (1618-1699) . Lindoro NL-3053 (Spain). 2018, p. 2021.
- "Alternen las avecillas" - Villancicos and other pieces in the Cathedral of Bogotá, 17th-18th c. . Lindoro NL-3073 (Spain). 2023, p. 2024.
- "Si de la esfera celeste" - Baroque music in the Cathedral of Bogota, Colombia. . Lindoro NL-3077 (Spain). 2023, p. 2025.
