= Blue Heron (vocal ensemble) =

Blue Heron, directed by Scott Metcalfe, is a professional vocal ensemble based in the Boston area. The ensemble presents an annual concert series in Cambridge, Massachusetts, and performs throughout New England as well as touring the US; it made its European debut in the United Kingdom in 2017.

Blue Heron's repertoire extends from plainchant to new music, with a particular focus on 15th- and 16th-century polyphony. Its performing style is informed by the rigorous study of original source materials and historical performance practice, with the general goal of expressing the text dramatically and revealing the music's rhetorical momentum. The group has experimented with the historical pronunciation of Latin and other languages, vocal scoring, the use of instruments, and pitch level. Alex Ross in The New Yorker described the ensemble as offering "imaginative realizations" of earlier repertory.

The ensemble has recorded a number of CDs; the fifth disc in the Music from the Peterhouse Partbooks series won the 2018 Gramophone Classical Music Award for Early Music, having previously been selected by Gramophone as an Editor's Choice, and a Critic's Choice for 2017.

== History ==
Blue Heron was founded in 1999 by the singer and musicologist Noël Bisson, the singer Cheryl Ryder, and the director, Scott Metcalfe, who is also a baroque violinist. The original intention was to create a professional vocal ensemble devoted to performing medieval and Renaissance music.

Blue Heron's first concert on October 16, 1999, under its original name of Blue Heron Renaissance Choir, featured music from the Peterhouse partbooks, which were copied c. 1540 for Canterbury Cathedral in England. One of the partbooks was lost and another damaged in the intervening centuries, but the missing parts had recently been reconstructed and published by the English musicologist and composer Nick Sandon. Music from this source has been featured in every concert season since, and five CDs of this repertoire were released by the group between 2010 and 2017. The series has been characterized as "one of the most important early choral projects of our time" by D. James Ross of Early Music Review.

In addition to the Peterhouse repertoire, the ensemble has made a specialty of 15th-century Franco-Flemish polyphony and often presents music seldom heard since its composition hundreds of years ago - a strategy that might be called "early music as new music". Metcalfe and the ensemble study how the music was originally performed, experimenting with vocal scoring, historical pronunciation of Latin and other languages, the use of instruments in vocal pieces, and pitch levels other than the modern A440, to create lively, expressive performances.

Blue Heron was ensemble in residence at Boston College (2009–2012) and at the Boston University Center for Early Music Studies (2012–2015).

In 2015, the ensemble inaugurated Ockeghem@600, a project to perform the complete works of Johannes Ockeghem (c. 1420–1497), in thirteen concerts across seven seasons. Work on a new series of recordings of Ockeghem began in the fall of 2018. The first of two CDs containing Ockeghem's complete songs was released in November 2019. The second is expected in 2022.

== Concerts ==
The ensemble presented its debut concert on October 16, 1999 at St. Peter's Episcopal Church in Cambridge. It now holds concerts all over the Boston area, and since 2004 has presented its own subscription season at First Church in Cambridge, Congregational. Its 20th season (2018–2019) included five concert programs. Including all touring and self-presented concerts, the ensemble offered over two dozen performances.

Blue Heron draws from a roster of musicians in order to constitute the ensemble best suited to the repertoire at hand. The performing ensemble may range in size from three singers (for a 15th-century chanson) to as many as thirteen (for a large-scale early 16th-century English mass in a cathedral setting) and adds instruments such as slide trumpet, trombone, dulcian, fiddle, rebec, harp, and lute when appropriate. Most of the members reside in the Boston area, but the ensemble employs musicians from across the US.

The group has appeared in other concert series and at venues throughout the United States, including Music Before 1800 in New York City and the Library of Congress in Washington, D.C., as well as in Pittsburgh, Cleveland, Shaker Heights, Milwaukee, St. Louis, San Francisco, Seattle, Grand Rapids, and Philadelphia. In 2008, the ensemble made its West Coast debut at Festival Mozaic in San Luis Obispo, California.

Many colleges and universities have hosted Blue Heron, including Harvard, M.I.T., Tufts, Yale (Institute of Sacred Music), Boston College, Boston University, Bowdoin, Wellesley, Endicott, Keene State College, Williams, Queensborough Community College, Colgate, Syracuse University, Salem State College, the University of Chicago, the University of Vermont, and SUNY Binghamton. The group has collaborated with a number of museums, including The National Gallery of Art, Dumbarton Oaks (Harvard University), the Cloisters (Metropolitan Museum of Art), the Museum of Fine Arts Boston, the Arthur M. Sackler Museum (Harvard), and the Currier Gallery of Art (Concord, New Hampshire).

In October 2017, the ensemble gave its debut concerts in the United Kingdom, performing in the chapels of Peterhouse and Trinity Colleges in Cambridge, and in London at Lambeth Palace Library. In the 2018–19 season, the ensemble made its Canadian debut, appearing in Montreal and Vancouver. In June 2022, the ensemble will make its debut in continental Europe at the Tage Alter Musik festival in Regensburg, Germany.

== Accolades and awards ==
With Jessie Ann Owens of the University of California, Davis, Blue Heron was recognized with the 2015 Noah Greenberg Award from the American Musicological Society; the prize helped fund the preparation and world premiere recording of Cipriano de Rore's first book of madrigals, I madrigali a cinque voci of 1542. A 2-CD set of the complete book was released in October 2019.

The fifth disc in the series, Music from the Peterhouse Partbooks (BHCD1007), was selected by Gramophone magazine as the 2018 winner in the Gramophone Classical Music Awards Early Music category.

Blue Heron is a constituent organization of ArtsBoston and receives an annual Cultural Investment Portfolio grant from the Massachusetts Cultural Council, a state agency.

== Special projects ==
In January 2016, Blue Heron collaborated with the Boston-based string ensemble A Far Cry on a performance of Gabriel Fauré's Requiem; in the concert it also sang "Le Cantique des cantiques" for twelve voices by Jean-Yves Daniel-Lesur, composed in 1952.

Blue Heron has mounted several multimedia events, including "Capturing Music", in connection with the release of Thomas Forrest Kelly's book of the same name in 2014, and "Taking Apart the Partbooks" in 2017, which was related to its Peterhouse partbooks project. Also in 2017, in collaboration with Cleveland's Les Délices, it presented a multimedia production of Guillaume de Machaut's Remede de Fortune.

== Recordings ==
Blue Heron's recorded output on its own label includes a series of five CDs containing mostly world premiere recordings, Music From the Peterhouse Partbooks. The first disc was released in 2010 and the fifth in 2017; a five-CD boxed set of these discs, entitled The Lost Music of Canterbury, was released in September 2018. Other CDs include a disc of the music of Guillaume Du Fay, a live recording of English medieval Christmas music, a 2-CD set containing the world premiere recording of Cipriano de Rore's "I madrigali a cinque voci", and a CD of songs of Johannes Ockeghem (and others), which is the start of a series of recordings connected to the group's Ockeghem@600 project.

The ensemble also recorded a CD of music to accompany the book Capturing Music: The Story of Notation by Thomas Forrest Kelly.

Blue Heron recorded music composed by Tod Machover for "Vocal Vibrations", an experience offered at Le Laboratoire in Paris in 2014 and at Le Laboratoire's location in Cambridge, Massachusetts, in 2015.

== Discography ==
=== Full-length CDs and Sets ===
- Guillaume Du Fay: Motets, Hymns, Chansons, Sanctus Papale (2007; BHCD1001)
- Hugh Aston: Three Marian Antiphons (Music from the Peterhouse Partbooks, Vol. 1) – (2010; BHCD1002)
- Nicholas Ludford: Missa Regnum mundi (Music from the Peterhouse Partbooks, Vol. 2) – (2012; BHCD1003)
- Nicholas Ludford: Missa Inclina cor meum (Music from the Peterhouse Partbooks, Vol. 3) – (2013; BHCD1004)
- Robert Jones: Missa Spes nostra (Music from the Peterhouse Partbooks, Vol. 4) – (2016; BHCD1005)
- Christmas in Medieval England (Live) – (2016; BHCD1006)
- Anonymous: Missa Sine nomine (Music from the Peterhouse Partbooks, Vol. 5) – (2017; BHCD1007)
- The Lost Music of Canterbury: Music from the Peterhouse Partbooks (5 CDs) – (2018; BHCD1008)
- Cipriano de Rore: I madrigali a cinque voci (2 CDs) – (2019; BHCD1009)
- Johannes Ockeghem: Complete Songs, Volume 1 – (2019; BHCD1010)
- Lessons from Nightingales: Songs of Sufi Mysteries, with Dünya – (2025; BHCD1015)

=== Other recordings ===
- "Taverner: Dum transisset sabbatum (II)", one-track single (2015; BHDR 2001)
- Companion CD for Capturing Music: The Story of Notation by Thomas Forrest Kelly (W. W. Norton, 2014; ISBN 978-0-393-06496-4; 17 tracks).
- Recordings for The Oxford Recorded Anthology of Western Music, edited by David J. Rothenberg and Robert R. Holzer (Oxford University Press, 2012; ISBN 978-0-199-76828-8): En mon cuer by Guillaume de Machaut and Oscellecto salvaggio by Jacopo de Bologna.
