= Pantagruel (ensemble) =

Pantagruel is an international early music ensemble specialising in semi-staged performances of Renaissance music. The group was formed in Essen, Germany at the end of 2002 by the English lutenist Mark Wheeler (lute, cittern, and gittern) and the German born Dominik Schneider (Renaissance recorder and flute, gittern, and vocals). With the addition of the Scottish soprano Hannah Morrison in 2004, the ensemble began to perform throughout Europe.

Performances have taken place at the Münster Baroque Festival, Utrecht Early Music Festival, Aachen Bach Festival, and the National Portrait Gallery in London. In 2009 Morrison was replaced by Danish soprano Anna Maria Wierød.

The group is named after Pantagruel, the protagonist of François Rabelais's 1532 novel Gargantua and Pantagruel. They have adopted the book's motto "do what thou wilt" to describe their approach to early music. They combine serious musicological research with their experience not only in classical music, but also in rock music, jazz, theatre, and dance. Their performances further expand classical concert conventions using renaissance practices of medley, improvisation, and gesture.

== Discography ==
- 2006: Elizium - Elizabethan Ballads, Ayres & Dances
- 2008: Laydie Louthians Lilte - Ballads, Ayres & Dances from 17th Century Scotland
- 2011: Nymphidia - The Court of Faerie
