= Marco Beasley =

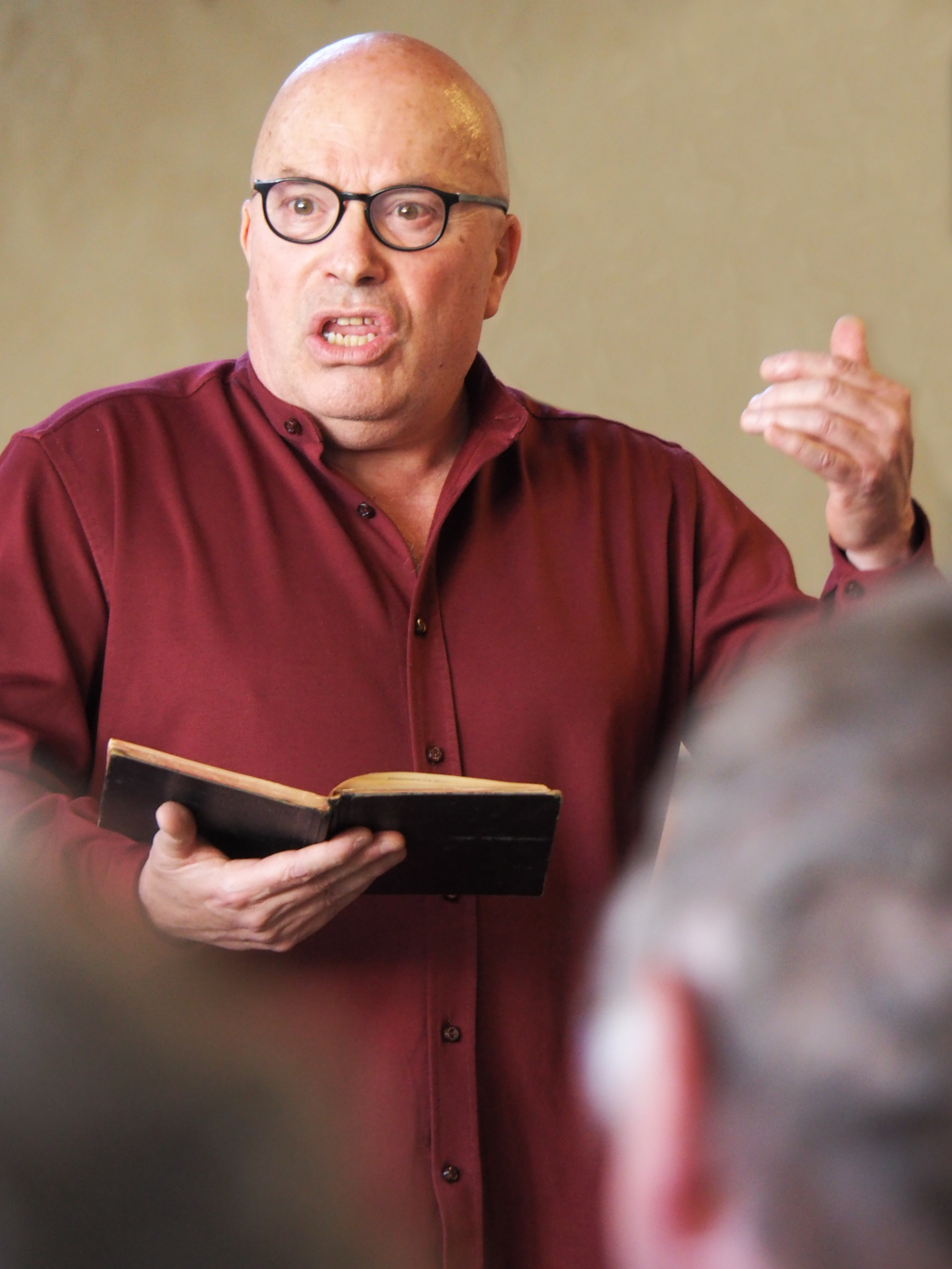
- Beasley in 2024.

Background information
- Born: February 27, 1957 (age 68); Naples, Italy
- Occupation: Musician Musicologist Voice Actor

Marco Beasley (26 February 1957, Naples) is an Italian tenor, voice-actor and musicologist.

With composer and harpsichordist Guido Morini, Beasley was one of the three founding members of the Accordone early music ensemble in 1984; Stefano Rocco was later replaced by violinist Enrico Gatti. Beasley is a notable advocate in baroque performance practice for the revival of the recitar cantando of baroque Italy and the frottole of Naples, though his "folk" touches are not equally appreciated by all classical music critics.

Beasley sang the lead role of the Ancient Mariner in Luca Francesconi's opera Ballata at the Leipzig Opera in 2002.

== Selected discography ==
- Stradella opera Moro per Amore. Velardi. Bongiovanni
- Musique Baroque a Naples, E. Barbella, F. Mancini, sonatas Gaetano Latilla: T'aggio voluto bene Giulio Cesare Rubino: cantata Lena, Giuseppe Porsile: Cantata sopra l'arcicalascione. Marco Beasley, with Bruno Ré, Paolo Capirci, Fabio Menditto, Federico Marincola, Andrea Damiani, as Ensemble Musica Ficta (Italy). Pierre Verany PV. 789023, 1989
- Canzoni Villanesche: Neapolitan Love Songs of the 16th Century Daedalus Ensemble 1994
- Past Time in Good Company – 10 year anniversary disc for Alpha Records: 1 track with L'Arpeggiata, directed Christina Pluhar 1998
- Meraviglia d'amore Private Musicke, Pierre Pitzl ORF
- Il Sogno d'Orfeo Accordone ORF 2002
- L'Amore Ostinato Accordone ORF 2002
- Vox Clamans in Solitudine Accordone 2002
- Il Salotto Napoletano – salon songs Accordone ORF
- Novellette E Madrigali Madrigalisti delle RSI and Ensemble Vanitas 2002
- La Bella Noeva Accordone Alpha 2003
- Stefano Landi: Homo fugit velut umbra – L'Arpeggiata Christina Pluhar Alpha Records 2003
- La Tarantella – Antidotum L'Arpeggiata Christina Pluhar 2003
- All Improvviso L'Arpeggiata Christina Pluhar 2004
- Frottole. Accordone Cypres Records 2006
- Recitar cantando Accordone Cypres 2006
- Guido Morini: Una Odissea Netherlands Wind Ensemble 2007
- Il Settecento Napoletano Accordone 2007
- Alessandro Scarlatti: Il Martirio di Santa Cecilia dir. Diego Fasolis 2008
- Guido Morini: Si Dolce Netherlands Wind Ensemble 2009
- Vivifice Spiritus Vitae Vis Accordone 2009
- Fra Diavolo Accordone Arcana Records 2011
- Bellerofonte Castaldi Ferita d'amore. Lute solos, with 2 tracks with Beasley. Arcana 2011
- Storie di Napoli Accordone Alpha 2012
- Cantate Deo Accordone Alpha 2013 – Beasley sings both parts of tenor duets
