= Chiara Margarita Cozzolani =

Italian composer

Chiara Margarita Cozzolani (27 November 1602 – ca. 1676–1678), was a Baroque music composer, singer and Benedictine nun. She spent her adult life cloistered in the convent of Santa Radegonda, Milan, where she served as prioress and abbess and stopped composing. She was one of more than a dozen cloistered women who published sacred music in seventeenth-century Italy.

== Life and career ==
Margarita Cozzolani was the youngest daughter of a wealthy merchant family in Milan, Italy. She entered the convent and took her vows in 1620. She added "Chiara" as her religious name.

She was a prolific composer, her style characterized by sequences and the switching of modes. The duets and solos in her 1642 Concerti Sacri followed the Lombard style. Her four musical opere were published between 1640 and 1650, which is the date of her Vespers, perhaps her best-known single work. There is also a Paschal Mass. Her first publication, Primavera di fiori musicali, survived into the 20th Century, but was lost in 1945.

In the convent of Santa Radegonda, the nuns sang during major religious feast days, which drew a great deal of attention from the outside world. As abbess of Santa Radegonda, Cozzolani defended the nuns' music, which came under attack from Archbishop Alfonso Litta, who wanted to reform the convent by limiting the nuns' practice of music and other contact with the outside world. The archbishop could not have been reassured by the ecstatic report of Filippo Picinelli, in Ateneo dei letterati milanesi (Milan, 1670) who found that "the nuns of Santa Radegonda of Milan are gifted with such rare and exquisite talents in music that they are acknowledged to be the best singers of Italy. They wear the Cassinese habits of St. Benedict, but they seem to any listener to be white and melodious swans, who fill hearts with wonder, and spirit away tongues in their praise. Among these sisters, Donna Chiara Margarita Cozzolani merits the highest praise, Chiara in name but even more so in merit, and Margarita for her unusual and excellent nobility of invention...".

Donna Chiara Margarita Cozzolani disappears from the convent's records after 1676. The first modern edition of her complete motets, for one to five voices and continuo, appeared in 1998.

== Works ==
- Primavera di fiori musicali, for 1–4 voices and continuo, op. 1 (Milan 1640) (lost)
- Concerti sacri, for 2–4 voices and continuo, op. 2 (Venice 1642)
- Scherzi di sacra melodia, for 1 voice and continuo op. 3 (Venice 1648) (continuo lost)
- Salmi à otto... motetti ei dialoghi, for 2–8 voices and continuo, op. 3 [sic] (Venice 1650)
- O dulcis Jesu, for 2 voices (soprano or tenor) and continuo
- No, no no che mare, aria (lost)
- Vespro della beata vergine
- Venite gentes, for voice and continuo (lost)
