= Alexandre Danilevski =

Russian composer

Alexandre Danilevski

Alexandre Danilevski (Russian: Александр Данилевский; born in 1957 in Saint Petersburg) is a Russian-born French composer, lutenist, vielle player, active in Metz, France. He is the artistic director of Syntagma, an early music ensemble noted in particular for interpretations of music by the trouvères, Italian composers from Trecento, and Russian and Ukrainian baroque composers.

In 2012 Danilevski was profiled in an hour-long program on the Dutch radio station Concertzender.

== List of works ==
=== Piano solo ===
- Sonata N° 2 (1987) Sonata-Reminiscenza: In Memoriam Nikolai Medtner
- Sonata "1985. In Memoriam Charles Ives"
- Le Retour
- Piano Suite in g
- Raining on Kopenhagen;
- Sonates I and II;
- Night Music;
- Concerto for two pianos

=== Other instruments ===
- Sonata I for violin and piano;
- "Revelation" for cello solo, ed. by HH-Musikverlag: AD001
- Three Inventions for three melodic instruments
- Ricercars (7 pieces for recorder or flute solo – in print now: Edition Tre Fontane);
- "Tombeau de Messiaen" for organ, commissioned for the festival "La Route des Orgues";
- Dolce Suono for two recorders – ed. by Tre Fontane: ETF 2038
- "Antiphones – I" (1997 – in print Tre Fontane) and II
- Senza Titolo
- Organum for string orchestra;
- String Quartets I to X

=== For voice and instrumental ensemble ===
- Koanes, 2013
- Lauda 'Se mai per maraveglia'
- Oda an die Traurigkeit
- "Seven Words of Christ"
- Pietа for soprano and string quartet, recorder and organ ad libitum;

== Recordings ==
- A. Danilevski. Koanes. Fragments of Consciousness. Centaur Records, 2016 – ensemble Syntagma and ensemble SurPlus
- A. Danilevski. The Uncertainty Principle, Carpe Diem, 2012 ("Lauda", "Oda an die Traurigkeit" – Syntagma, "Antiphones" – Flanders Recorder Quartet, "Révélation" – Larissa Groeneveld, cello)
- "Journey to the Cedar Forest" from the ballet Enkidu and Gilgamesh

Early Music

- "Johannes Ciconia and his time" Melodia 1998
- "Russian Baroque Music" Pierre Vérany, 2002
- "Touz esforciez /Trouvères en Lorraine", Pierre Vérany, 2004
- "Gautier d'Epinal/Remembrance", Challenge, 2008
- "Stylems" (music from Trecento) Challenge, 2008
- "Rosa e Orticha" (music from Trecento) Carpe Diem, 2011
- "Songé .i. songe" (mediabook; songs and a Dit enté by Jehan de Lescurel, early 14th century) FacSimile, 2015
- "Gesta Romanorum (mediabook; 13th – 14th centuries) FacSimile, 2018

Contemporary Music:

- A. Danilevski "The Uncertainty Principle', Carpe Diem, 2012
- A. Danilevski "Koans. Fragments of Consciousness'. Centaur, 2016
