= Vespro della Beata Vergine discography =

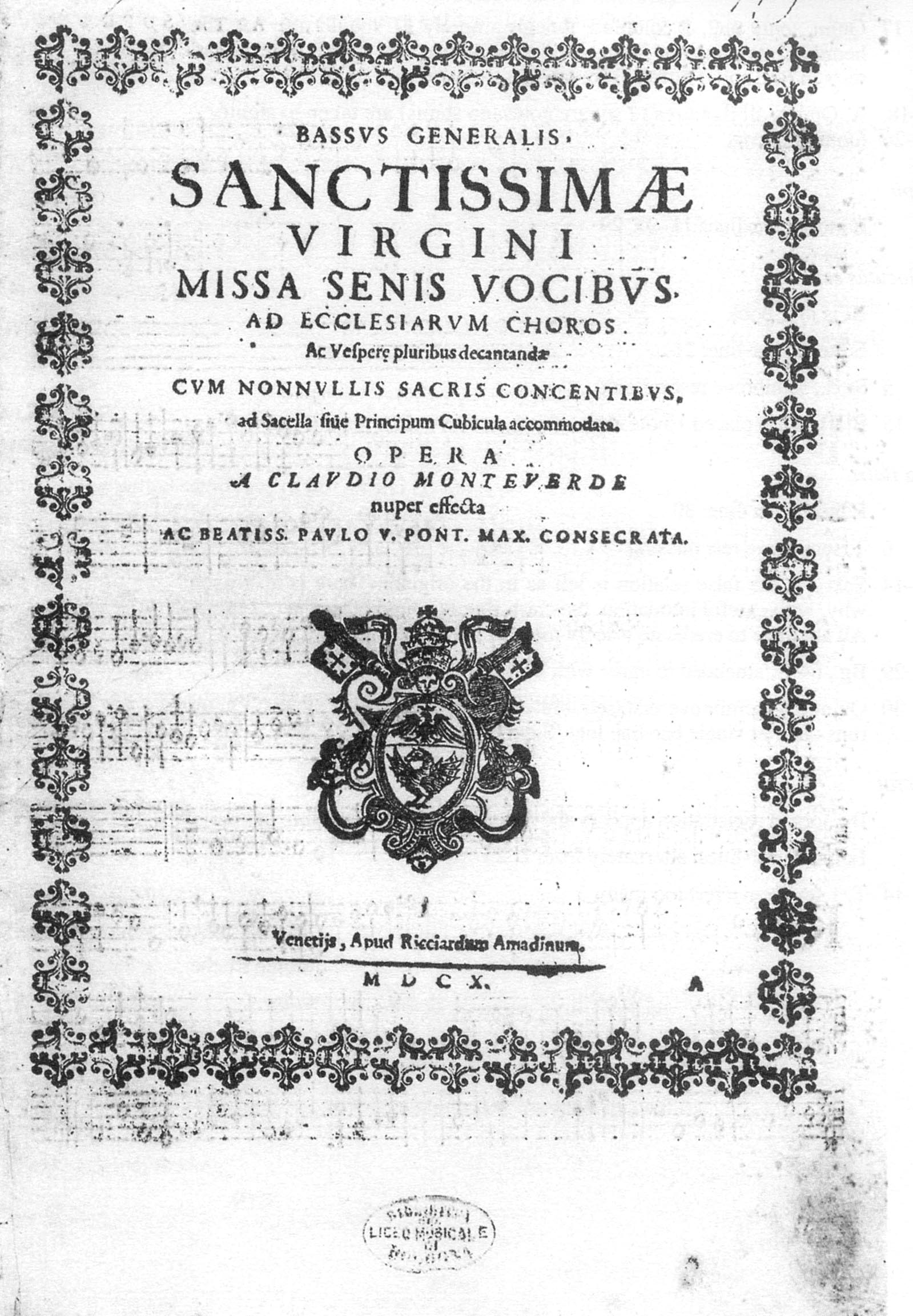

This is a discography of the recordings of Vespro della Beata Vergine by Claudio Monteverdi – also known as his Vespers of 1610. Since the first vinyl recordings of the work in 1953, the Vespers have been recorded in numerous versions. Some versions are choral-based, others use one voice per part (OVPP). Some versions use modern instruments, but since the first recording on period instruments appeared in the 1960s their use has become normal. Sir John Eliot Gardiner has recorded the Vespers with both modern and period instruments, explaining that the latter are now played to a higher standard than when he made his first recording in the 1970s. In the late 1970s the Monteverdi orchestra, which he founded, transitioned to period instruments and became the English Baroque Soloists.

The recordings also reflect the fact that there is a debate about whether the Vespers were originally performed as a single work. Sometimes it has been decided to add material or omit items in order to replicate a church service. In a few cases, for example the Stevens recording, the "sacred concertos" (Note: "Sacred concertos" was Monteverdi's term for the non-liturgical anthems that separate the five canonical psalms. Some critics have argued against their acceptability as part of the Vespers service,) that divide the psalms are replaced by antiphonal chants.

In the list, the "Year" column indicates year of initial issue of each recording. For pre-1982 recordings, details of the first compact disc issue are included; thereafter, all issues refer to CDs. Where the date of recording is significantly earlier than the issue date, a note has been added. Many of the recordings have been reissued, sometimes multiple times, often under different labels – reissue details are not included.

== List of recordings ==
Year	Performers	Conductor	Label and number	Notes	Refs
1953	Univ of Illinois SO, The Oratorio Society	Leopold Stokowski	LP: Univ of Illinois CRS1	LP format only. Incomplete: items not in the usual order. Modern instruments.	
1953	Swabian Choral Singers, Stuttgart Bach Orch.	Hans Grischkat	LP: STUX 52004	LP format only. Based on Redlich edition; items not in the usual order. Modern instruments.	
1953	London St Anthony Singers, Oiseau-Lyre Orch	Anthony Lewis		LP format only. Modern instruments.	
1967	Lausanne Vocal and Instrumental Ensemble	Michel Corboz	LP: Erato STU 70325-7; CD (1990): Apex 2564 61429-2 (reissued, other labels)	Period instruments.	
1967	Monteverdi-Chor Hamburg, Vienna Concertus Musicians	Jürgen Jürgens	LP: Telefunken AWT 9501-2; CD (1994): Teldec 4509 92175-2	Period instruments.	
1967	Gregg Smith Singers, Texas Boys Choir of Fort Worth, Colombia Baroque Ensemble	Robert Craft	LP: Columbia M2L 363; CD (1996): Sony 62656	Items in not in the usual order. Modern instruments.	
1967	Deller Consort, French National Radio Choir and Orchestra	Maurice Le Roux	LP: Concert Hall Soc. SMS 2518; CD (1988): Adès OR13.270-2	Modern instruments.	
1967	Ambrosian Singers, Orch. of the Accademia Monteverdiana	Denis Stevens	LP: Vanguard VCS 10001/2	LP format only. Stevens edition, replaces concertos with plainchant antiphons. Modern instruments.	
1968	Polifonica Ambrosiana Choir and Orchestra	Giuseppe Biella	LP: Musica Antiqua Sacra PAB 1306/07	LP format only. Omits concertos	
1970	Berlin Radio Ensemble, Berlin Chamber Orchestra	Helmut Koch	LP: Eterna 8 26056/7	LP format only. Based on an edition by Walter Goehr – omits both Magnificats. Modern instruments.	
1975	Monteverdi Choir and Orchestra, Philip Jones Brass Ensemble, Salisbury Cathedral Choir, David Munrow Recorder Ensemble	John Eliot Gardiner	LP: Decca SET593/4; CD (1986): Decca 414 573/4-2, (reissued)	Modern instruments.	
1975	Regensburg Cathedral Choir and Instrumental Ensemble	Hanns-Martin Schneidt	LP: Archiv 2710 017; CD (1996): Archiv 447 719-2	Based on edition of Gottfried Wolters. Period instruments.	
1975	Pacifica Singers, Musica Pacifica	Paul Vorwerk	LP: Musica Pacifica PCFM 1002	LP format only. Period instruments.	
1976	Early Music Consort of London, King's College Choir, Cambridge	Philip Ledger	LP: EMI ASD3256/7; CD (1995): EMI 7243 5 68632/3 (reissued)	Based on an edition by Denis Arnold. Period instruments.	
1976	Chapel Choirs of Musics Montserrat, Collegium Aureum	Irenu Segarra	LP: Harmonia Mundi 1C 165-99 681-82	LP format only. Period instruments.	
1980	Aachen Cathedral Choir and Orchestra	Rudolf Pohl	LP:Interdisc ID602	LP format only.	
1980	Pro Cantione Antiqua, Hannover Boys' Choir, Collegium Aureum, Musica Fiat	Heinz Hennig	LP: Interdisc ID603; CD (1991): Ars Musici AM1000-2 (reissued)	Period instruments.	
1981	Les Petits Chanteurs de Chaillot, La Grande Ecurie et la Chambre du Roy, Vocal Ensemble Roger Thirot, Choir School Notre Dame, Les Sacquboutiers de Toulouse	Jean-Claude Malgoire	LP: CBS Masterworks D2 36943; CD (2012): Sony G0100027508299	Period instruments	
1983	Vocal Ensemble of Lausanne, Schola des Petits Chanteurs de Notre Dame de Sion, Ensemble of Ancient Instruments	Michel Corboz	LP: Erato NUM75030/1; CD (1983): Erato ECD 2292-45183-2 (reissued)	Period instruments.	
1983	The Harvard-Radcliffe Collegium Musicum, Baroque Orchestra, NY Cornet and Sacbut Ensemble	Jameson Marvin	LP: Titanic 120/121	LP format only. Period instruments.	
1984	Taverner Consort and Players	Andrew Parrott	EMI CDC 7 47078/9 (reissued)	Period instruments	
1986	Tölz Boys' Choir, Vienna Hofburgkapelle Schola, Vienna Concertus	Nikolaus Harnoncourt	WCJ 2564 69464-8 (reissued)	Period instruments	
1986	La Chapelle Royale, Collegium Vocale Gent and Les Saqueboutiers de Toulouse	Philippe Herreweghe	Harmonia Mundi HMX290 1247-8 (reissued)	Period instruments	
1988	The Sixteen Choir and Orchestra	Harry Christophers	Hyperion 66311/2 (reissued)	Period instruments. Recast as Vespers of St Barbara, with text and musical arrangements	
1989	La Capella Reial, Coro del Centro Musica Antica di Padova	Jordi Savall	Auvidis Astrée E8719 (reissued)	Period instruments	
1989	Musica Fiata Köln, Stuttgart Chamber Choir, Choralschola Niederalteich	Frieder Bernius	DHM RD77760 (reissued)	Period instruments	
1989	New London Consort	Philip Pickett	L'Oiseau-Lyre 425 823-2OH2 (reissued)		
1989	The Monteverdi Choir, The London Oratory Junior Choir, His Majestys Sagbutts & Cornetts, The English Baroque Soloists	John Eliot Gardiner	Archiv 429 565-2AH2 (reissued)	Second recording by Gardiner	
1993	The Scholars Baroque Ensemble		Naxos 8 550662/3		
1994	Cantus Cölln, Concerto Palatino	Konrad Junghänel	Deutsche HM G01100009381079 (reissued)		
1995	Vokalensemble Frankfurt, Instumentalensemble "Il basso"	Ralf Otto	Capriccio C10516		
1996	Netherland Chamber Choir, Concerto Vocale	René Jacobs	: Harmonia Mundi HMC90 1566/7	Period instruments	
1996	London Bach Orchestra, London Cornett & Sackbutt Ensemble	Louis Halsey	BBC Records 156569187-7	Period instruments. Recorded 25 May 1970.	
1996	Dresden Chamber Choir, Early Music Consort of Dresden, Wind Collegium of Leipzig	Hans-Christoph Rademann	Raumklang 9605	Period instruments. Based on Wolters edition	
1997	Boston Baroque Orchestra	Martin Pearlman	Telarc 2CD80453		
1997	Les Arts Florissants Orchestra and Chorus, Les Sacqueboutiers de Toulouse	William Christie	Erato 3984 23139-2 (reissued)		
1998	Coro della Radio Svizzera, Ensemble More Antiquo, Concerto Palatino, I Barocchisti	Diego Fasolis	Arts 47594-9		
1999	Verso Chorus, Madrigalia Choir, Elyma Ensemble	Gabriel Garrido	K617 K617 100 (reissued)		
1999	Bach Collegium Japan, Concerto Palatino	Masaaki Suzuki	BIS BIS-CD1071/2 (reissued)		
1999	Zagreb Radio Choir, Zagreb Philharmonic Orchestra	Lovro von Matačić	Living Stage LS1035	Live recording 5 June 1974	
2002	Tragicomedia, Concerto Palatino	Stephen Stubbs	ATMA Classique ACD22304/5		
2004	Concerto Italiano	Rinaldo Alessandrini	Naïve OP30403 (reissued)		
2004	Yorkshire Bach Choir	Peter Seymour	Cloister CLOCD0304		
2005	Gabrieli Consort and Players	Paul McCreesh	Archiv 477 6147AH2 (reissued)		
2006	The King's Consort Choir and Orchestra	Robert King	Hyperion CDA67531/2		
2007	New York's Grande Bande	Frederick Renz	Musical Heritage Society 523536W	Period instruments	
2007	Southern Sinfonia, Rodolfus Choir, The English Cornet & Sackbut Ensemble	Ralph Allwood	Signum SIGCD109	Period instruments	
2007	La Petite Bande	Sigiswald Kuijken	Challenge Classics CC72311		
2008	Soloists, chorus and orchestra (unspecified)	Eugen Jochum	Andromeda ANDRCD9031	Live recording 6 September 1957	
2010	Ensemble Concerto, Ensemble la Pifarescha, Concerto Palatino	Roberto Gini	Dynamic CDS656/1-3		
2010	New College Choir Oxford, Charivari Agréable	Edward Higginbottom	novum NCR1382		
2010	Apollo's Fire	Jeannette Sorrell	Avie AV2206		
2011	Choir and Orchestra of the Age of Enlightenment	Robert Howarth	Signum SIGCD237		
2011	L'Arpeggiata	Christina Pluhar	Erato 6419942		
2011	Musica Fiata	Roland Wilson	Pan Classics PC10240		
2012	Concerto Palatino, Himlische Cantorey, Hanover Boys Choir, Vox Werdensis, Musica Alta Ripa	Jörg Breiding	Rondeau ROP7012-13		
2013	Western Michigan University Chorale, Seraphic Fire	Patrick Dupré Quigley	Seraphic Fire Media SFMCD06		
2014	Choeur de Chambre de Namur, Cappella Mediterranea	Leonardo García Alarcón	Ambronay AMY041		
2014	The Sixteen	Harry Christophers	Coro 16126	Second recording by The Sixteen	
2014	amarcord, Lautten Compagney	Wolfgang Katschner	Carus CARUS83394		
2016	Ensemble San Felice, La Pifaresca period brass ensemble	Federico Bardazzi	Brilliant Classics 95188BR		
2017	Dunedin Consort, His Majestys Sagbutts & Cornetts	John Butt	Linn CKD569		
2017	Cantar Lontano	Marco Mencoboni	Pan Classics PC10371		
2017	La Compagnia del Madrigale, Cantica Symphonia, La Pifarescha	Giuseppe Maletto	Glossa GCD922807		
2018	Collegium Vocale Gent	Philippe Herreweghe	Phi	Second recording by Herreweghe and Collegium Vocale Gent	
2019	La Tempête	Simon-Pierre Bestion	Alpha 552		
2023	Pygmalion	Raphaël Pichon	Harmonia Mundi 902710.11		

== Notes and references ==
Notes

Citations

Sources

- Kurtzman, Jeffrey (2000). The Monteverdi Vespers of 1610 : Music, Context, Performance. Oxford: Oxford University Press. ISBN 0-19-816409-2.
- Whenham, John (1997). Monteverdi: Vespers 1610. Cambridge: Cambridge University Press. ISBN 978-0-521-45377-6.
