= Mary Remnant =

English musicologist (1935–2020)

Mary Remnant DSG FSA CF
- Born: Mary Teresa Elizabeth Remnant; 13 January 1935; London, England
- Died: 15 May 2020 (aged 85); Isle of Wight, England
- Occupations: Violinist; Pianist; Percussionist; Musicologist

Mary Teresa Elizabeth Remnant DSG FSA CF (13 January 1935 – 15 May 2020), was an English musician, scholar, musicologist and medievalist. She was a leading figure in the Early music revival in the United Kingdom.

== Background ==
She was the only daughter of Joan Lovegrove, a music teacher, and Eustace Remnant, architect and art historian. While studying piano and violin at the Royal College of Music, she was awarded the Tagore Gold Medal. She went on to specialise in Early Music. A Graduate of the Royal Schools of Music and an Associate of the Royal College of Music in London, she completed her DPhil on Bowed instruments at St Anne's College, Oxford University. She taught piano and violin, and was for a time, demonstrator of historic early keyboard instruments in the RCM Museum. She was awarded a Winston Churchill Memorial Trust Fellowship in 1967, and was able to study in detail and bring back to life the early musical instruments portrayed in carvings and on the walls of churches along the Camino de Santiago in France, Spain and elsewhere in Europe.

== Career ==
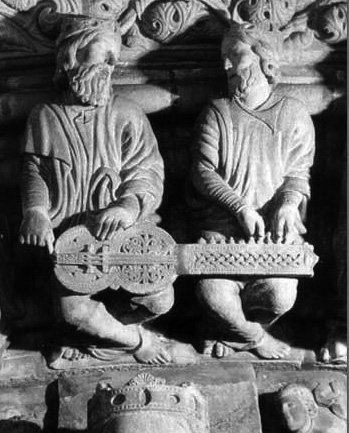
Carving of musicians playing the Organistrum at Santiago de Compostela Cathedral in Spain

Remnant was elected a Fellow of the Society of Antiquaries of London in 1989, having come to prominence as a world renowned scholar and enthusiast of early music and early musical instruments. She was an acknowledged expert in her field and is quoted in various subsequent works of reference.

As a session musician, she participated in broadcasts from the early 1960s, for instance, playing the vielle and organetto with Pro Musica Sacra and Ian Partridge. Remnant featured in numerous recordings of David Munrow's Early Music Consort, variously playing organ, fiddle, tabor and drums. She also played fiddle, alto crumhorn and tambourin with John Stewart Beckett and Michael Morrow's ensemble, Musica Reservata in recitals of Guillaume de Machaut and the music of Spain, broadcast by the BBC during 1967–8. As part of her many popular lecture-recitals, including at the Purcell Room on London's South Bank, she played early music on reconstructed instruments, often made to order by the instrument maker, Alan Crumpler. She would describe and play a wide range of early instruments, including the harp, psaltery, rebec, organistrum, pipe, shawm, horn, chime bells and percussion. She would demonstrate the sound of an instrument by playing a tune and illustrate it with pictures of the instrument from carvings, paintings, or engravings. Her organistrum was based on the one found on the Portico de la Gloria in Santiago Cathedral.

She travelled widely across Europe and the United States and was the author of several books and numerous articles on Medieval music.

Like her father before her, Remnant was a member of many academic societies, and was a stalwart member of the National Early Music Association. She was an active member of the Catholic Writers Guild. Between 1973 and 2014 Mary Remnant participated in the musical formation of the junior choir at Brompton Oratory. In recognition of her lifelong work for the Roman Catholic Church in England, in 2016 she was invested by bishop John Sherrington as a Papal Dame of the Order of St. Gregory the Great at her local church, Our Lady of Dolours, Chelsea.

=== Confraternity of St James ===
She was a founding member of The Confraternity of St James (CSJ), which began on 13 January 1983 in her house in Chelsea, on her birthday with a gathering of six early English pilgrims. As a committee member for many years she supported the fledging organisation in various ways, including setting up the CSJ choir which continued for some thirty years. This gave an opportunity to revive both medieval pilgrim songs and many ancient hymns. Among pilgrim groups on the Continent, CSJ was known as the singing association. The choir sang at pilgrim weddings, funerals, on feasts of St James and on the platform of the Paris Métro. It performed at several of her lecture recitals in The Purcell Room, at a benefit concert in 11 Downing Street, in the ruins of Merton Abbey, in Canterbury Cathedral and in Reading Abbey and the adjoining Church of St James.

Remnant died on the Isle of Wight in May 2020.

== Selected publications ==
- Remnant, M. 1965. ‘The gittern in English medieval art’, Galpin Society Journal, vol. 18, 104–9.
- Remnant, M. "The Use of Frets on Rebecs and Medieval Fiddles" Galpin Society Journal, 21, 1968, p. 146.
- Remnant, M. "The Gittern in English Art", The Galpin Society Journal, 17 (1976), 104–09 (pp. 105, 108).
- Remnant, M., and Marks, R. 1980. ‘A medieval “gittern”’, British Museum Yearbook 4, Music and Civilisation, 83–134.
- Remnant, M. "Musical Instruments of the West". 240 pp. Batsford, London, 1978. Reprinted by Batsford in 1989 ISBN 9780713451696. Digitized by the University of Michigan 17 May 2010.
- Remnant, Mary (1986). English Bowed Instruments from Anglo-Saxon to Tudor Times. Clarendon Press. ISBN 978-0-1981-6134-9.
- Remnant, Mary (1989). Musical Instruments: An Illustrated History : from Antiquity to the Present. 54. Amadeus Press. ISBN 978-0-9313-4023-9.
- Remnant, M. (ed.) "Plays by women". Volume 8 edited and introduced by Mary Remnant. London: Methuen, 1990, ISBN 0413634906
- Remnant, M. "Survey of Medieval Instruments" in Davidson, Clifford, "Material Culture & Medieval Drama" (1999). All Books and Monographs by WMU Authors. 546. https://scholarworks.wmich.edu/books/546
- Remnant, M., "Fiddle [fedylle, ffidil, ffythele, fiele, fithele, phidil, vithele etc.]", The New Grove Dictionary of Music and Musicians, second edition, edited by Stanley Sadie and John Tyrrell London: Macmillan Publishers, 2001.

== Selected discography ==
- Music of the Age of Chivalry, Mary Remnant, Petronela Dittmer, Matthew Hart Dyke – Strumenti Del Medioevo Per Audiofili; Label: Audiophile Sound – AUD 046, Metronome Recordings – AUD 046; Format: CD; Country: Italy; Released: 2004; Genre: Classical; Style: Medieval
Medieval and modern reconstructed instruments as studied and played by Mary Remnant
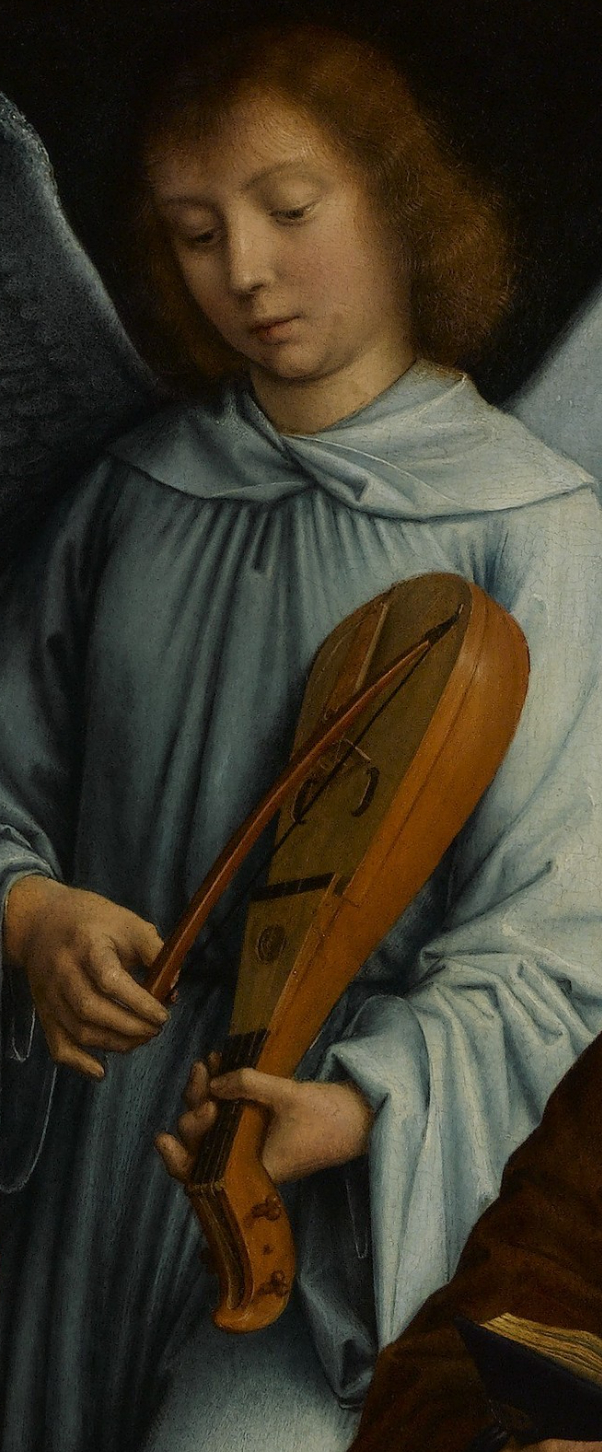
rebec in "Virgin among Virgins" (1509), by Gerard David

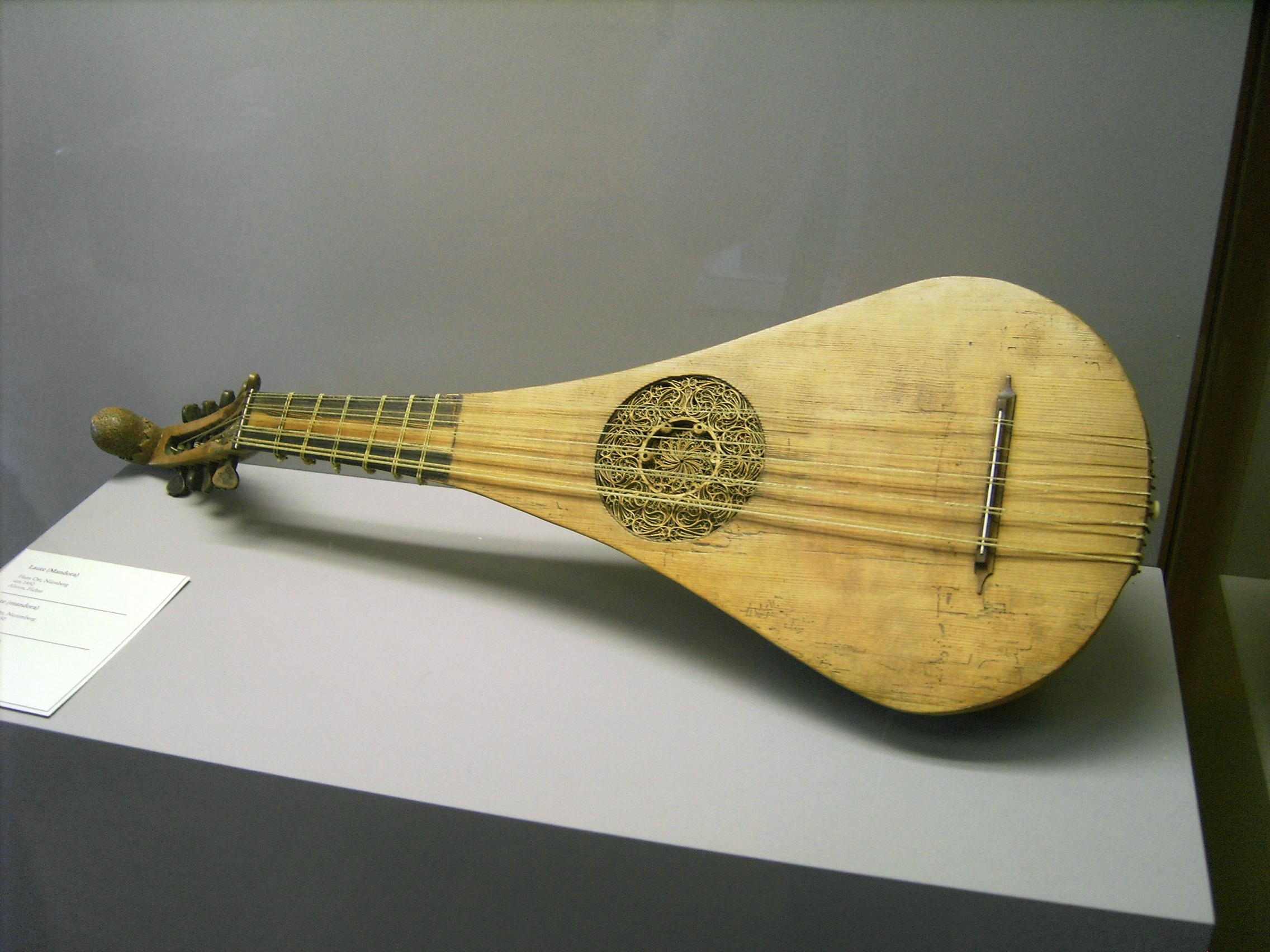
Five course Gittern or "Quintern" dated 1450, built by luthier Hans Oth

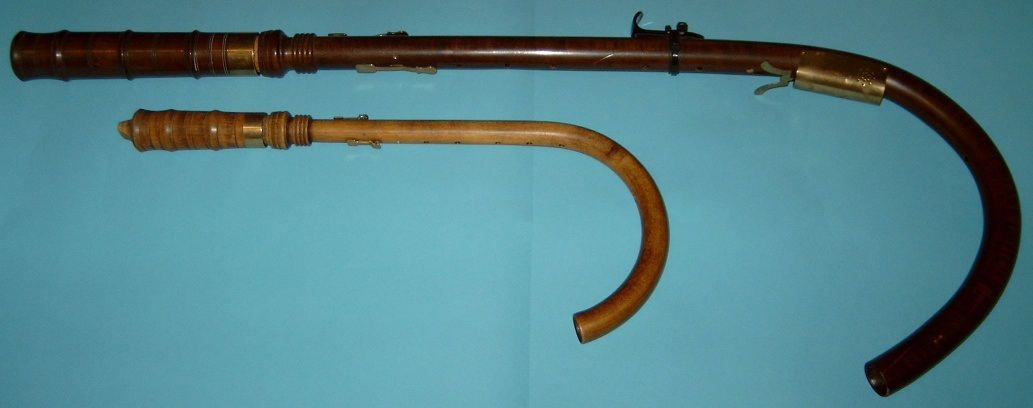
modern crumhorns with keys, alto crumhorn in F and bass crumhorn in F

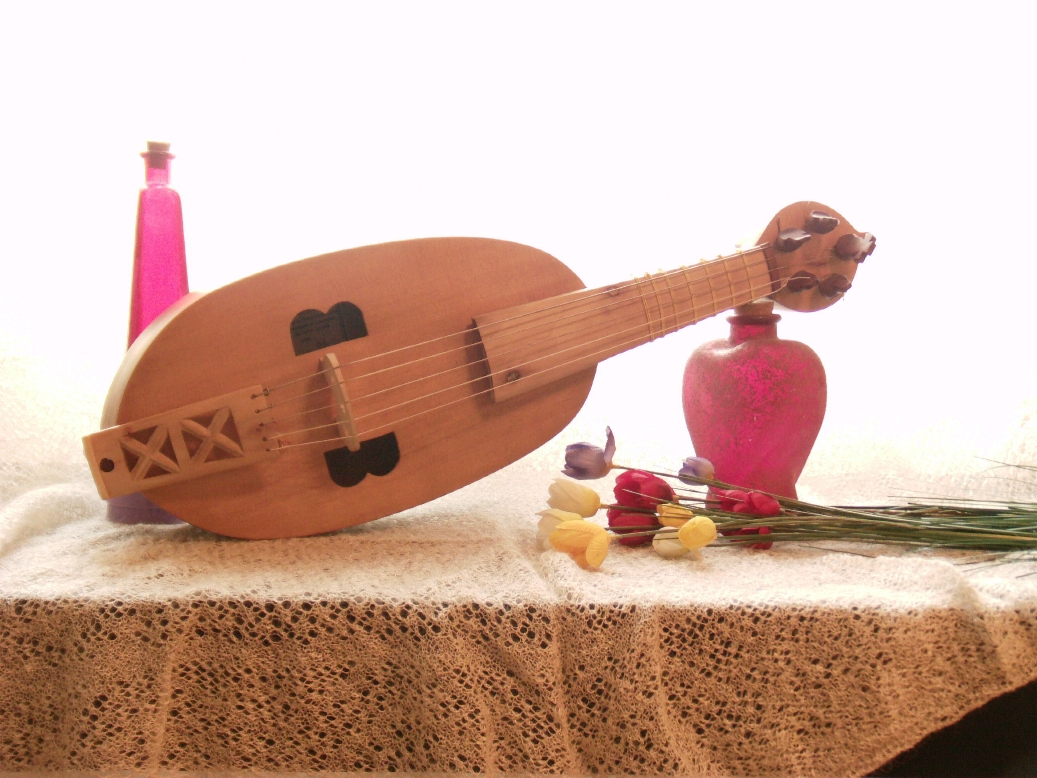
Modern build of a viella from Spain. Based on a sculpture instrument at the Mirta Caviello del Portico de la Gloria de Santiago de Compostela

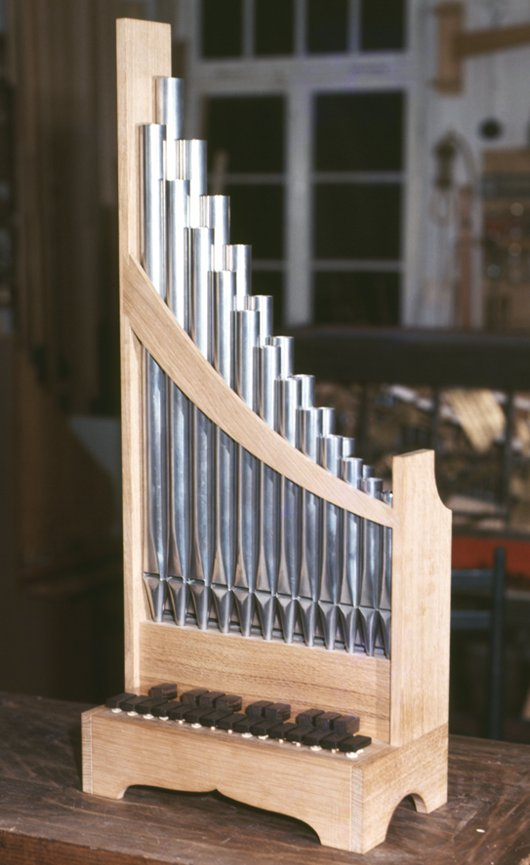
A historical-style organetto built in Germany in 1979
