= James Bowman (countertenor) =

English singer (1941–2023)

James Bowman CBE
- Born: James Thomas Bowman; 6 November 1941; Oxford, England
- Died: 27 March 2023 (aged 81); Redhill, England
- Occupation: Countertenor
- Organisations: Early Music Consort; Chapel Royal, St. James's Palace
- Awards: L'Ordre des Arts et des Lettres; Medal of Honour of the City of Paris
- Website: www.users.globalnet.co.uk/~pattle/bowman/

James Thomas Bowman CBE (6 November 1941 – 27 March 2023) was an English countertenor. His career spanned opera, oratorio, contemporary music and solo recitals. Arguably, he was, after Alfred Deller, the most important countertenor in the 20th century revival of the voice part. He combined early and baroque repertoires with contemporary work, becoming recognised for his portrayal of Oberon in Britten's A Midsummer Night's Dream and performing world premieres.

== Life ==
=== Education ===
Bowman's background was in Anglican church music. He was educated at King's Ely where he began singing as a boy chorister at Ely Cathedral, progressing to become head chorister. After the traditional rest when his voice broke, he returned to the choir as a bass. Around 1959, he gave his first public performance as a countertenor to a school congregation in the Lady Chapel. He later went to New College, Oxford, as a choral scholar and was a member of the New College and Christ Church choirs.

=== Career ===
After finishing his studies, Bowman was briefly a teacher. However, in the late 1960s he became active as a countertenor soloist, a career which lasted more than 40 years.

==== Opera ====
In 1967, Bowman auditioned for Benjamin Britten's English Opera Group. He was cast as Oberon in A Midsummer Night's Dream. The role had been composed with Alfred Deller's ethereal voice in mind. Deller sang in the 1960 premiere and his two recordings of the work have a claim to being definitive as regards the sound Britten intended. However, Bowman, who had a larger voice than Deller and a more commanding stage presence, went on to have a long association with the role, finally recording his interpretation with the City of London Sinfonia under Richard Hickox in 1993. He appeared at Glyndebourne in 1970 in Francesco Cavalli's La Calisto, as the first countertenor to sing there, conducted by Raymond Leppard and alongside Janet Baker. He sang at the English National Opera in 1971 in Handel's Semele, and at the Royal Opera House in 1972 in Taverner by Peter Maxwell Davies. In 1973 he created the role of the Voice of Apollo in Britten's Death in Venice.

Bowman retired from the operatic stage to concentrate on concert work after having appeared at most of the world's major opera houses including La Scala in Milan, Stopera in Amsterdam, Palais Garnier in Paris, the Aix-en-Provence Festival, Sydney Opera House, Verona Arena, Vienna State Opera, Opéra de Strasbourg, Santa Fe Opera, Dallas Opera, and San Francisco Opera.

==== Early music ====
In 1965 Bowman met David Munrow and was invited to join the Early Music Consort of London. The ensemble flourished in the ten years from 1967 to 1976, making many recordings and touring. When Munrow died in 1976, the group disbanded but Bowman continued to work with former members such as the harpsichordist and conductor Christopher Hogwood and the lutenist Robert Spencer.

In 1967 Bowman sang in one of Purcell's odes at the opening concert of London's Queen Elizabeth Hall. In the years 1969–1975 Bowman sang in the choir of Westminster Abbey. For many years Bowman was a member of the early music choral group Pro Cantione Antiqua. In recital he often worked with the lutenist Dorothy Linell and the pianist Andrew Plant.

==== Contemporary music ====
As well as the Britten and Maxwell Davies operatic productions, Bowman gave the world premieres of contemporary works by composers including Geoffrey Burgon, Alan Ridout and Richard Rodney Bennett. He also commissioned the Self-laudatory hymn of Inanna and her omnipotence from Michael Nyman. He appeared in the world premiere of Britten's Canticle IV: The Journey of the Magi in 1971.

=== Later life ===
The suicide of David Munrow in 1976 left Bowman in such a state of shock that he lost his voice and had to retrain.

In 2010 it was announced that Bowman would give his last London concert in 2011 at the Wigmore Hall, although he would continue to give recitals outside the capital. A few years previously he retired from the Chapel Royal, St. James's Palace, in London, after a decade of service.

Bowman died on 27 March 2023, at age 81.

== Awards and positions ==
- In 1992 the French Government honoured Bowman with admission to L'Ordre des Arts et des Lettres and he also received the Medal of Honour of the City of Paris, in recognition of his contribution to the musical life of the city.
- He was president of the Holst Singers.
- In May 1992 Bowman received an honorary doctorate from the University of Newcastle upon Tyne.
- He was made a Commander of the Order of the British Empire in the Queen's Birthday Honours in June 1997.
- In November 1998 Bowman was made an honorary fellow of New College, Oxford.
- In December 2006, after Sir Malcolm Arnold died, Bowman succeeded him as Patron of the Northamptonshire Choral Foundation, and thus the Choirs of All Saints' Church, Northampton.
- He was a vice-president of The Bach Choir.

== Discography ==
Bowman made over 180 recordings with major record labels. One of his first recordings was a 1967 LP of Baroque music for EMI, Charpentier's Messe de minuit pour Noël, H.9., with the Choir of King's College, Cambridge, and the English Chamber Orchestra conducted by David Willcocks.

He recorded with many leading conductors including Frans Brüggen, John Eliot Gardiner, Nikolaus Harnoncourt, Christopher Hogwood, Gustav Leonhardt and Roger Norrington. Between 1988 and 2001 he made many recordings for Hyperion Records with The King's Consort and their conductor Robert King, including the complete odes of Henry Purcell, secular songs and church music, Handel's Judas Maccabaeus, the Occasional Oratorio, Deborah, Joseph and his Brethren, Giulio Cesare, Ottone, and Joshua, discs of Schelle, Kuhnau and Knüpfer, and two solo discs of Handel arias. He recorded Britten's Midsummer Night's Dream in 1993, with the City of London Sinfonia conducted by Richard Hickox. He appeared in the 1985 Tony Palmer film about Handel God Rot Tunbridge Wells!, singing 'Ombra mai fu' from Serse.

Bowman's twentieth-century repertoire included Ten Blake Songs and Linden Lea by Vaughan Williams on the Meridian Records label and Songs of Innocence, a recital album of mostly English songs with Andrew Swait (treble) and pianist Andrew Plant. In 2011 he recorded lute songs by John Dowland and others on the CD Songs and Sorrowful Sonnets with Dorothy Linell. It was made available as a digital download in 2023.
