= Terpsichore (Praetorius) =

Compendium of dances arranged by Michael Praetorius

Terpsichore, or Terpsichore, Musarum Aoniarum, is a compendium of more than 300 instrumental dances published in 1612 by the German composer Michael Praetorius. The collection takes its name from the muse of dance.

In his introduction Praetorius takes credit for arranging the music rather than composing the tunes. The collection is based on French dance repertoire of the time with dances such as the bourrée. However, some of the tunes have been identified as coming from elsewhere in Europe, for example England and Spain.

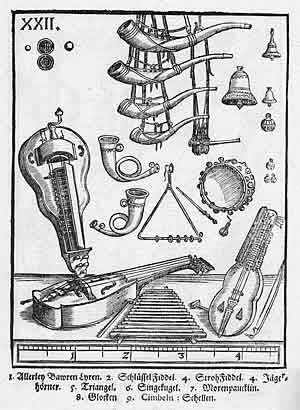
An illustration of several musical instruments from Syntagma Musicum

The publication was rediscovered in the twentieth century during the early music revival.

== Instrumentation ==
Terpsichore contains some notes which relate to instrumentation, but does not specify which instruments should play particular parts. A variety of instruments have been used to play Terpsichore.

Sometimes performers draw on another work by Praetorius, Syntagma Musicum, which is an important source of information regarding historical instruments. The Early Music Consort used this approach in the 1970s, and the New London Consort in the 1980s. However, Syntagma Musicum is not necessarily a guide to the instrumentation of Terpsichore. The musicologist Peter Holman suggests that the dances were conceived primarily for violin consorts, although "Praetorius was clearly aware that potential purchasers in Germany might want to play them on wind instruments".

== In popular culture ==
=== Film use ===
- A courante (#93) and a "bourrée" (#32) from Terpsichore, in arrangements by David Munrow, are used for a ballet sequence danced by Louis XIII (played by Graham Armitage) in the 1971 film The Devils.
- An arrangement of "Volte" by Arnie Roth is used in the 2002 animated film Barbie as Rapunzel.

=== Music ===
- The Fifth Estate had a hit record in 1967 with their rock version of "Ding-Dong! The Witch Is Dead", in which they interpolated "La Bourrée" from the Terpsichore suite, played on a sopranino recorder in G, as described by Michael Praetorius in the Syntagma.
- On Cleveland's classical station WCLV 95.5-FM in the 1970s, Albert Petrak used "La Bourrée" as the theme music for his 6:15 am "First Program." Petrak curated a collection of 32 versions of the "Bourrée" for his show.

== Discography ==
Recordings include selections performed by

- the Early Music Consort
- the New London Consort
- Ricercar Consort and Ensemble La Fenice

== See also ==
- Muses in popular culture
