= Martyn Hill =

British operatic tenor

Martyn Hill (b. 14 Sept 1944) is a British tenor.

== Life and career ==
Hill was born in Rochester, Kent on September 14, 1944. He studied at King's College, Cambridge, followed by the Royal College of Music. He pursued further vocal training with Audrey Langford.

A versatile singer, Hill's career has encompassed a wide repertoire from a variety of musical periods. He began his career as a founding member of Christopher Hogwood and David Munrow's Early Music Consort in 1967; an ensemble which specialized in historically informed performance of Medieval and Renaissance music. He performed with that group until it disbanded upon David Munrow's death in 1976. He then concentrated his career performing music from the Baroque Period before eventually moving his attention into becoming a specialist in German lieder.

On the opera stage, Hill performed the role of Arbace in Mozart's Idomeneo at the Zürich Opera under the baton of Nikolaus Harnoncourt, and later performed the title role in that opera at the Glyndebourne Festival Opera in 1985. He returned to Glyndebourne in 1988 as Belmonte in Die Entführung aus dem Serail. He made his debut at the Scottish Opera in 1988 as Peter Quint in Benjamin Britten's The Turn of the Screw. He made his debut at Covent Garden in 1996 and returned regularly.
