= The Art of Courtly Love =

The Art of Courtly Love may refer to:

- De amore, a twelfth century treatise by Andreas Capellanus known in English as The Art of Courtly Love
- The Art of Courtly Love, a 1973 3-LP box set by The Early Music Consort of London
