= Early music revival =

19th-century revival of interest in Baroque and other pre-classical music

An early music revival is a renewed interest in music from ancient history or prehistory. The general discussion of how to perform music from ancient or earlier times did not become an important subject of interest until the 19th century, when Europeans began looking to ancient culture generally, and musicians began to discover the musical riches from earlier centuries. The idea of performing early music more "authentically", with a sense of incorporating historically informed performance, was more completely established in the 20th century, creating a modern early music revival that continues today.

== Study and performance of ancient music before the 19th century ==
In England, Johann Pepusch developed an "Academy of Ancient Music" in the 1720s to study music by Palestrina, Tomás Luis de Victoria, William Byrd, Thomas Morley, and other composers at least a century old. In Vienna, Baron Gottfried van Swieten presented house concerts of ancient music in the late 1700s, where Mozart developed his love of music by Bach and Handel.

At the end of the 18th century, Samuel Wesley was promoting the music of Bach.

== 19th century ==
In 1808, Samuel Wesley began performing Bach's organ music in a series of London concerts.

Felix Mendelssohn is often credited as an important figure in reviving the music of J.S. Bach, in what is termed the "Bach revival". He conducted a performance of Bach's St Matthew Passion on 11 March 1829, cited as one of the most significant events in the early music revival, although the performance used contemporary instruments and the work was condensed, leaving out a significant amount of Bach's music.

== Early 20th century ==
In the early 20th century, musical historians in the emerging field of musicology began to look at Medieval and Renaissance music more carefully, preparing performing editions of many works. Aside from choirs at the cathedral churches in England which were reviving these pieces, establishing a new standard and tradition in performing Renaissance choral music, several independent instrumental ensembles also emerged in the 1960s. They included Musica Reservata and David Munrow's Early Music Consort. Research into early music was carried out by members of the Galpin Society and independent scholars such as Mary Remnant and Christopher Hogwood.

Other important milestones in the early music revival included the 1933 founding of the Schola Cantorum Basiliensis in Basel, Switzerland by Paul Sacher—together with distinguished musicians including the pioneering specialist in early vocal music Max Meili, who contributed to the extensive L'Anthologie Sonore series of early music recordings and recorded Renaissance lute songs for His Master's Voice—and the 1937 presentation and recording of some of Monteverdi’s Madrigals by Nadia Boulanger in France. Arnold Dolmetsch is widely considered the key figure in the early music revival in the early 20th century. Dolmetsch's 1915 book The Interpretation of the Music of the XVIIth and XVIIIth Centuries was a milestone in the development of authentic performances of early music.

== Late 20th century ==
By the 1950s the early music revival was underway, and was a fully established phenomenon by the end of the 1970s. It was centered primarily in London and Basel (at the Schola Cantorum Basiliensis), although there was much activity in other European and American cities, especially New York, Boston, and San Francisco (centered around its Philharmonia Baroque). It had far-reaching and important effects for the way that people listen to classical music and the way it is taught, performed, sponsored and sold. Few people involved in the classical music industry today would not acknowledge the breadth and depth of the impact that this movement has had. As much as any other force in the period, the protagonists of the early music revival were opponents of cultural values that, in the late 1950s, seemed virtually unquestionable. The revival of interest in music from earlier periods was more widely felt than in the pedagogy and performance practice of European art music; it also influenced the performance practices and research of popular music and the music of oral traditions. Also, in the 1970s and 1980s many ensembles in Europe, led by the likes of Nikolaus Harnoncourt (Austria), Gustav Leonhardt, Jos van Veldhoven (Netherlands), Philippe Herreweghe, Sigiswald Kuijken (Belgium), Christopher Hogwood, Trevor Pinnock and John Eliot Gardiner (England); and many others, made works in baroque and early classical periods approachable and accessible for a much greater public.

The early music revival changed the listening habits of classical music audiences by introducing them to a range of music of which they were largely unaware. In the long term, the performance methods and values of the early music revivalist, particularly what became known as a quest for 'authenticity' had a permanent effect not only on early music performance, but also on the performance of music from later periods.

Most interest was centered on the medieval and renaissance periods, and to a certain extent, the first part of the baroque period. However, it could be misleading to think of this revival simply in chronological terms, because early music performers soon extended their interests to later periods. The focus was not simply on repertoire, but on the ways in which the music is conceived, the process by which it is learned, and the manners in which it is performed.

At this time established pioneers of early music such as the English counter-tenor Alfred Deller were joined by a new wave of specialist groups such as Musica Reservata, the Early Music Consort, the Monteverdi Choir and the English Baroque Soloists. The music they played, and the way it was performed, appeared new in comparison to the sounds that most people were used to from classical music; it seemed fresh and exotic.

Another important aspect to the revival was the reconstruction of instruments of the Renaissance and Baroque periods. People like Otto Steinkopf (one of the most knowledgeable and talented Berlin instrument makers and performers) started the meticulous reproduction of woodwinds: crumhorns, cornamuses, rauschpfeifes, shawms, flutes and early types of clarinets and oboes. Other manufacturers like the Renaissance Workshop Company (formerly J. Woods and Sons Ltd.) played an important role in the development of early music in the 20th and 21st centuries.

== 21st century ==
There continues to be a great flourishing of ensembles, training programs, concert series, and recordings devoted to ancient music in the 21st century. In Europe a proliferation of early music festivals and specialist departments of music conservatories, have made early music an established part of mainstream musical activity.

In the United States, gatherings such as the Boston Early Music Festival and organizations such as Early Music America, the Renaissance and Baroque Society of Pittsburgh and the San Francisco Early Music Society continue to promote the study and performance of ancient music. Several college music departments, such as the Peabody Institute, Indiana University, Oberlin Conservatory of Music, the University of North Texas, and Boston University, have strong early music degree programs.

In Montréal, Quebec, there is a lively early music scene, much of it as a result of the early music department of McGill University, established by Kenneth Gilbert in the 1960.

Recordings of all eras of early music and works of many lesser-known composers are now available. While some major recording labels have reduced funding for classical music recordings, a large number of independent classical labels, such as Harmonia Mundi and Hyperion, continue to produce early music recordings. The majority of recorded music available is found for purchase (or download) on the internet.
