= The Art of the Netherlands (recording) =

Compilation album by Early Music Consort
- Released: 1976
- Genre: Early music
- Label: EMI
- Compiler: David Munrow

Early Music Consort chronology
The Art of Courtly Love (1973)	The Art of the Netherlands (1976)

The Art of the Netherlands was an influential collection of recordings made by the Early Music Consort of London under the direction of David Munrow and issued in 1976 as a three-disk set.

The recording (SLS 5049) was split into 'Volumes' as follows:

Volume I: Secular Songs – 14 songs/chansons
Volume II: Instrumental Music – 13 pieces & Mass Movements – 5 pieces
Volume III: Motets – 9 pieces

== See also ==
- The Art of Courtly Love David Munrow, 3LP 1973
