= Grayston Burgess =

English countertenor and conductor (1932–2019)

- Born: 7 April 1932; Cheriton, Kent
- Died: 6 March 2019 (aged 86)
- Occupations: Singer and conductor

Grayston Burgess (7 April 1932 in Cheriton, Kent – 6 March 2019) was an English countertenor and conductor.

== Life and career ==
As a boy Burgess was a chorister in the choir of Canterbury Cathedral during the second world war. He then attended Cheltenham College before winning a choral scholarship to sing in the Choir of King's College, Cambridge under Boris Ord.

A former member of the Purcell Singers, Burgess formed the Purcell Consort of Voices in 1963. He also sang with the Studio der frühen Musik and the Musica Reservata Ensemble of Michael Morrow and John Beckett. Burgess premiered compositions including Michael Tippett's "Songs for Ariel".

After moving to rural Herefordshire in the 1980s, he taught singing at Ellerslie School, Malvern, and, on its closure, at Malvern College. His pupils included ex-Swingle Singer Wendy Nieper.

In 2000 he accepted an invitation to help form, and to direct, a local community choir to celebrate the Millennium. After its performance - of Haydn's Creation - this choir continued as a permanent feature in the form of Choir 2000, which became his inspiration and to which he himself has been an inspiration. In 2017 he was referred to by the Daily Telegraph as a 'veteran conductor and choir director' when he was interviewed for an article published on International Women's Day about the presence of women in British cathedral choirs. The article made no mention of his connection with the Campaign for the Traditional Cathedral Choir, a group which actively discriminates against the inclusion of women and girls in Cathedral and church choirs.

== Selected discography ==
Countertenor - Soloist

- Dowland LP

Conductor - Purcell Consort of Voices

- Music of Albert: Prince of Saxe, Coburg und Gotha Decca/Australian Eloquence.
