= New York Collegium =

The New York Collegium was an ensemble of players and singers dedicated to the music of the Baroque era, featuring historically authentic instruments and performance techniques. The artists of The New York Collegium were some of America’s best-known historic music specialists, and were featured performers in concert halls and music festivals throughout the world. The ensemble presented a subscription concert series in Manhattan, performing to a large and enthusiastic audience. Some of these performances have been broadcast on WGBH in Boston and on National Public Radio’s Performance Today. The ensemble was dissolved in 2010. British conductor and early music scholar, Andrew Parrott was Music Director of the New York Collegium from 2001 until its dissolution.
