= New London Consort =

- Origin: London, England
- Genres: Medieval, Renaissance and Baroque music
- Label: Decca
- Website: newlondonconsort.com

New London Consort was a London-based Renaissance and Baroque music ensemble, which performed in most of Europe and various other parts of the world. Founded and directed by Philip Pickett, most of its repertoire was recorded and broadcast by BBC (radio and television) and regularly appeared at major venues and festivals. This repertoire included unpublished works and new interpretations of familiar ones, sometimes controversial. The group has been inactive since its director's conviction as a sex offender in 2015.

== The ensemble ==
One of the world's leading early music ensembles, The New London Consort (NLC) was founded in London by Philip Pickett. All of the principal artists have solo careers in addition to their work with NLC.

In 2010 the New London Consort was appointed Associate Artists of Manchester's Bridgewater Hall.

== Repertoire ==
Its repertoire focused on medieval, Renaissance and Baroque music, including operas of the early Baroque period, and much of this work was unpublished or reconstructed.

Productions included Monteverdi's L'Orfeo, Bach's Easter Oratorio, Purcell's Indian Queen, Purcell and Eccles' version of Don Quixote, Acis & Galatea and Dido & Aeneas.

Some of their reinterpretations of familiar works were controversial. One example is their version of Purcell's The Fairy Queen, which did not base its plot on A Midsummer Night's Dream; instead, its cast of nine singers and five circus artists were in modern dress, travelling to Arcadia. It was received enthusiastically by The Guardian, but was criticised by London's Financial Times, which cited the production's being "divorced" from the Shakespeare play, calling it a "disappointment" and "uninteresting".

== Performances and recordings ==
The New London Concert performed regularly at major festivals and concert halls, in most of Europe, the Americas, the Middle East and China/Hong Kong. These include performances at the Perth International Arts Festival, the Strasbourg Philharmonie, Cité de la Musique in Paris, Sage Gateshead, the Bridgewater Hall in Manchester, Birmingham's Town Hall, the Beijing Music Festival, Israel Festival Jerusalem, and many appearances at the Palacio de Bellas Artes and the Festival Internacional Cervantino in Mexico. They appeared regularly at London's Southbank, where they were a resident ensemble from 1996 to 2005.

Much of its repertoire has been broadcast by BBC Radio 3, and they have appeared the television programmes BBC Music in Time, BBC2 Music in Camera and both of the Westminster Abbey Purcell Centenary concerts in 1995. They have recorded soundtracks for Channel 4's Tales from the Decameron, BBC TV's Shakespeare Series, and films such as Lady Jane, Robin Hood Prince of Thieves, A Man for all Seasons, Hamlet, Dangerous Beauty, Nostradamus and Elizabeth. From 1985, they recorded exclusively for Decca, with the exception of a series of CDs for LINN Records and the CD Music for Queen Mary with the Choir of Westminster Abbey.

== Discography ==
- 1986 – Praetorius: Dances from Terpsichore. L'Oiseau Lyre 414 633.
- 1987 – Anonymous, Carmina Burana, Vol. I. Decca "L'Oiseau-Lyre" 475 9106–1.
- 1988 – Anonymous, Carmina Burana, Vol. II. L'Oiseau Lyre "Florilegium" 421 062–2.
- 1988 – Virtuoso Italian Vocal Music. (O primavera). L'Oiseau Lyre 00100260-2 .
- 1989 – Anonymous, Carmina Burana, Vol. III-IV. L'Oiseau Lyre "Florilegium" 425 117-2 (2 CD).
- 1990 – The Sylvan And Oceanic Delights Of Posilipo. L'oiseau Lyre 425 610
- 1991 – Biber / Schmelzer: Trumpet Music. L'Oiseau-Lyre 425 834–2
- 1991 – Monteverdi: Marian Vespers. L'Oiseau Lyre 425 823 (2 CD)
- 1991 – The Pilgrimage to Santiago. L'Oiseau Lyre 475 9103 (2 CD).
- 1992 – Telemann: Suite In A Minor, Concertos. L'Oiseau-Lyre 433 043–2
- 1992 – John Blow: Venus and Adonis. L'Oiseau-Lyre 440 220–2
- 1992 – Music from the Time of Columbus. Linn 007
- 1992 – Llibre Vermell of Montserrat. Pilgrim songs & dances. L'Oiseau Lyre "Florilegium" 433 186–2.
- 1992 – Monteverdi: L'Orfeo. L'Oiseau Lyre 433 545 (2 CD)
- 1992 – Trionfi!. A Florentine Festival. L'Oiseau Lyre 436 718.
- 1992 – Elizabethan & Jacobean Consort Music. Linn 011.
- 1993 – Purcell, Eccles, Blow: Mad Songs. With Catherine Bott . L'Oiseau-Lyre 433 187
- 1993 – Susato: Dansereye, 1551. L'Oiseau Lyre 436 131.
- 1993 – The Feast of Fools. La Fête des Fous – Das Narrenfest. Decca L'Oiseau-Lyre 4780028.
- 1994 – Biber: Requiem. L'Oiseau-Lyre 436 460–2
- 1994 – Knightly Passions. The Songs of Oswald von Wolkenstein. L'Oiseau-Lyre 444 173–2.
- 1995 – Purcell: Music For Queen Mary. Junto con el Westminster Abbey Choir Sony 66243
- 1995 – Bach: Brandenburg Concertos. L'Oiseau Lyre 440 675 (2 CD)
- 1995 – Locke: Psyche. L'Oiseau Lyre 444 336
- 1995 – Monteverdi: Combattimento di Tancredi e Clorinda, Ballo delle ingrate, Tirsi e Clori. L'Oiseau-Lyre 440 637–2
- 1996 – Visitatio. Holy Week in Cividale del Friuli. L'Oiseau-Lyre 455 489-2OH.
- 1997 – Bach: Magnificat. A Bach Christmas. L'oiseau-lyre 452 920
- 1997 – Bach: 4 Orchestral Suites. L'Oiseau Lyre 452 000–2
- 1997 – Flecha: Ensaladas. L'Oiseau Lyre 444 810
- 1998 – Praetorius: Nativitas. Decca L'Oiseau-Lyre 458 025–2
- 1998 – Ars Subtilior. Linn Records 039.
- 1998 – The Sylvan and Oceanic Delights of Posilipo. A short account of the entertainment with dances. L'Oiseau Lyre 425 610.
- 1999 – Telemann: Water Music. Decca 455 621
- 1999 – Bach: Christmas Oratorio. Decca 458 838
- 2001 – Vivaldi: Gloria. Decca
- 2002 – Songs of Angels. Songs of ecstasy by Gautier de Coincy c. 1177-1236. Decca 460 794–2.

Albums with other groups::

- 1997 – Vivaldi: Concerto for 2 Mandolins, 14 Concertos. L'oiseau Lyre 455 703 (2 CD). El doble disco incluye obras interpretadas por The Bach Ensemble y The Academy of Ancient Music
- 1997 – Vivaldi: Gloria, Nulla in mundo pax sincera, Nisi Dominus, Cantatas. L'oiseau Lyre 455 727 (2 CD). El doble disco incluye obras interpretadas por The Academy of Ancient Music

Recompilations and boxed sets:

- 1994 – Anonymous, Carmina Burana. L'Oiseau Lyre 443 143 (4 CD). The box includes the following recordings:
  - 1987 – Anonymous, Carmina Burana, Vol. I
  - 1988 – Anonymous, Carmina Burana, Vol. II
  - 1989 – Anonymous, Carmina Burana, Vol. III-IV
- 1994 – Biber Requiem & Trumpet Music. L'Oiseau Lyre 458 081-2 (2 CD). The box includes the following recordings:
  - 1991 – Biber / Schmelzer: Trumpet Music.
  - 1994 – Biber: Requiem
- 1996 – Sinners & Saints. The Ultimate Medieval and Renaissance Music Collection. L'Oiseau Lyre 448 559.
- 2002 – The Speech of Angels. L'Oiseau-Lyre 452 773-2 (5 CD).
- 2002 – Popular Dances of the Renaissance. L'Oiseau-Lyre 460 026-2 (3 CD). The box includes the following recordings:
  - 1986 – Praetorius: Dances from Terpsichore
  - 1992 – Trionfi!. A Florentine Festival
  - 1993 – Susato: Dansereye, 1551
