= David Fallows =

English musicologist (born 1945)

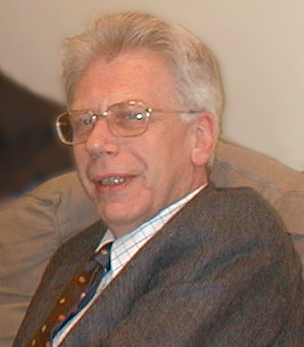
David Fallows in 2002

David Fallows (born 20 December 1945) is an English musicologist specializing in music of the late Middle Ages and early Renaissance, as well as the performance practice of music. He is a leader in fifteenth-century music studies, particularly secular song, Guillaume Dufay, and Josquin des Prez, both the subject of landmark biographies Fallows has written.

== Biography ==
Fallows was born in Buxton on 20 December 1945. He received his BA from Jesus College, Cambridge, his Masters of Music from King's College, London, and his Ph.D. (1978) from the University of California, Berkeley. He is an early music performer as a viol player and continuo harpsichordist, performing with the Studio der frühen Musik, Musica Mundana, and Musica Reservata.

He taught at the University of Manchester starting in 1976, where he is now Emeritus Professor of Musicology. Visiting appointments include University of Wisconsin, Madison, University of North Carolina, Chapel Hill, École Normale Supérieure, University of Basel, Harvard University and the University of Vienna. He received the Dent Medal in 1982, became Chevalier de l'Ordre des Arts et des Lettres in 1994, a Fellow of the British Academy in 1997, a Corresponding Member of the American Musicological Society in 1999, and an Honorary Member of the Royal Musical Association in 2012. From 2002–2007, he was president of the International Musicological Society.

His contributions were honoured with a Festschrift, Essays on Renaissance Music in Honour of David Fallows: Bon jour, bon mois, et bonne estrenne.

== Work ==
David Fallows's work has been called "pioneering" on the lives of composers and of the ensembles that performed music, and having covered "just about every aspect of fifteenth- and early sixteenth-century music." Among Fallows's first publications was, "Ciconia padre e figlio" (Ciconia: father and son; 1976), which theorized that the current biography of Johannes Ciconia was primarily that of his father, and that the composer himself was born about thirty-five years later. This theory has become the accepted biography of the composer. Also during his doctoral studies he reconstructed the origins of the important fourteenth-century polyphonic manuscripts in Cambrai ("L'origine du MS. 1328 de Cambrai"). His 1978 dissertation, "Robert Morton's Songs" was among Fallows's first works on English Renaissance music and fifteenth-century song, repertories that have concerned him throughout his life (including in his 2014 Musica Britannica volume on English song, 1380–1480). These studies formed the basis for his comprehensive A Catalogue of Polyphonic Songs, 1415–1480 (Oxford 1999). A major article on the life of Johannes Regis (1989) also had a transformative impact on the understanding of the composer. His 2009 study of the life and works of Josquin des Prez (Brepols) has been praised for understanding the conflicting information recently unearthed about the composer as well as presenting new hypotheses and understanding of the composer's music in light of new discoveries.

Fallows's 1982 monograph Dufay is the principal reference work on the life and works of the composer Guillaume Dufay. He has edited and introduced facsimile publications of the Songbook of Henry VIII, the manuscript Oxford, Canon. Misc 213, the Chansonnier Cordiforme, and others. As senior consulting editor for The New Grove Dictionary of Music and Musicians, Fallows contributed many major articles along with many small articles on musical diacritics (tempo and expression marks) and miscellany such as "Spoof Articles."
