= Cathal Gannon =

Irish harpsichord maker and fortepiano restorer (1910 – 1999)

Cathal Gannon (1 August 1910 – 23 May 1999), was an Irish harpsichord maker, a fortepiano restorer and an amateur horologist.

Gannon in his workshop

== Beginnings and education ==
Gannon was born in Dublin, Ireland, into a craftsmen family of carpenters, many of whom worked in the famous Guinness Brewery. His education, in two local schools, was rudimentary and at the age of fifteen he started working as an apprentice carpenter in the Brewery. His apprenticeship involved learning to make office furniture and attending evening classes in nearby colleges, where he was able to improve his education in a more congenial atmosphere. A love of music and the arts had been encouraged by two maiden aunts – his parents subsequently bought an upright piano and he learned to play it at the Read Pianoforte School – and consequently, when his apprenticeship was completed and he was on the dole for some years, he spent much of his spare time buying pictures, books, antiques and old clocks and watches in the various auction rooms and antique shops in Dublin

== Societies and acquaintances ==
During the mid-1930s, Gannon became a member of several Dublin-based societies, most notably the Old Dublin Society, and there befriended well-known people such as Grace Plunkett (née Gifford), the widow of Joseph Mary Plunkett (who had been executed after the Easter Rising of 1916). At around this time, Cathal was also introduced to Carl Hardebeck, an arranger of Irish traditional music. At a later stage in Cathal's life, he met Desmond Guinness and his wife Mariga, founders of the Irish Georgian Society, which he subsequently joined.

== Harpsichords ==
Gannon seated at his first harpsichord, completed in 1952

While reading a series of articles about Tibet in a magazine, Gannon stumbled across an article, which, he believed, was by Violet Gordon Woodhouse, a British harpsichordist and clavichord player of the period. The article was about the revival of the harpsichord, which interested young Gannon. He asked permission to examine the harpsichords on display in the National Museum, Dublin, but was given no encouragement by the staff. He was finally allowed to see the instruments when he was in his early twenties. Dismayed, he concluded that they were too expensive to buy and too complicated to make.

Whilst on holidays in Glengarriff in the West of Ireland during August 1936, Gannon met his future wife, Margaret Key from Harrow in London; they married in 1942.

In London with Margaret, who was visiting her parents, Gannon went to the Benton Fletcher collection of keyboard instruments, which was then in Chelsea, and measured a harpsichord by Jacob and Abraham Kirckman (1777). Back home, he made a copy of the instrument in a tiny conservatory at the back of his house in the Dublin suburb of Rialto. The harpsichord was played by John S. Beckett for the first time in public in 1959 as the continuo for Bach's Saint Matthew Passion and was praised in the national press. Beckett subsequently persuaded the authorities in the Guinness Brewery to provide Gannon with a special workshop, in which he made five harpsichords and restored several antique pianos. The first harpsichord made in the Brewery was donated to the Royal Irish Academy of Music in Dublin, The second was sold to Harrods of London, and the third was sold to Ireland's national radio and television station RTÉ. This third instrument was used regularly by the RTÉ Symphony and Concert orchestras and also by the well-known composer and performer of Irish traditional music, Seán Ó Riada.

== Retirement ==
Gannon continued to make many more harpsichords and restore more pianos during the years to come. In all, he completed 20 harpsichords during his lifetime – the final four were completed by a friend, Patrick Horsley, in England. One of the harpsichords made by Gannon-Horsley returned to Ireland and was presented to NUI Maynooth. A piano of note that Cathal restored was a Broadwood square piano owned by the poet and composer, Thomas Moore, which belonged to Lord and Lady Elveden (later Iveagh).

Gannon was the subject of several RTÉ radio programmes, three RTÉ television programmes (including The Late Late Show) and a television programme, Gallery, made by BBC Northern Ireland. He befriended a great many people, including the artist, writer and conservationist Peter Pearson, and regular musical evenings were held at the family home in Bryan Guinness's grounds in the suburbs of Dublin. Because of his interest in antique clocks and watches, he became a member of the Irish branch of the Antiquarian Horological Society, founded by his friend William Stuart.

== Honorary degrees ==
In 1978, Trinity College Dublin gave Gannon an honorary MA degree for his contribution to the authentic performance of early music in Ireland. Two years later, Cathal was invited to travel with the New Irish Chamber Orchestra to China, where he tuned and maintained one of his harpsichords and celebrated his seventieth birthday. In 1989, a second honorary MA was given to him, this time by NUI Maynooth.

== Decline ==
Following his 80th birthday, which was attended by fifty people, Gannon finally settled down to retirement. A series of minor strokes followed, which eventually led to dementia and ultimately to his death, aged 88, in May 1999.

== Legacy ==
The Cathal Gannon Early Music Room was opened in the Royal Irish Academy of Music in May 2003. It contained a harpsichord and clavichord made by Gannon, a Broadwood grand piano restored by him, and a square piano.

Part of a transmitted RTÉ programme, Nationwide (17 January 2007), featured archive footage of Gannon and his instruments.

Three RTÉ radio programmes, Bowman: Sunday Morning, broadcast on 12 November 19 and 26 November 2006, feature a 1983 interview with Gannon.
