= Confraternity of Saint James =

Spanish pilgrims' association and educational charity

The Confraternity of Saint James is a pilgrims' association, educational charity and book publisher for the ancient and modern-day pilgrim route Camino de Santiago or "way of Saint James" to the city of Santiago de Compostela in Galicia in northern Spain.

It exists to promote all pilgrim routes to Santiago throughout western Europe as well as support all people undertaking them either on foot, by bike, on horseback or in a wheelchair. It has around 1,300 members around the world, although the vast majority are British, and is the only official association of St James in the United Kingdom. As such, it is the only accredited UK-based distributor of the Pilgrim Passport (credencial), the official pilgrim document recognised by Santiago Cathedral that proves ones bona fide pilgrim status. By collecting pilgrim stamps on this document, the traveller can access pilgrim accommodation along the Way, as well as qualify for the ancient certificate of completion, the Compostela, provided they have travelled a minimum of the final 100 km - or 200 km if cycling.

The charity is based in London, England and publishes books in English for many of the routes on the Way of St. James. It also carries books on the history, spirituality, culture, architecture and musical associations with the Camino in its extensive pilgrim library.

The CSJ hold events throughout the year. These include practical seminars to help pilgrims know how to prepare, coffee mornings and wine bar evenings get togethers for pilgrims to compare experiences and join the Camino community in the UK, occasional guided walks around the UK, as well as annual lectures on Camino-related topics. These are often given by qualified academics, owed to the CSJ's relationships with various centres of pilgrim study around the world.

== See also ==
- Mary Remnant
