= Andrew Parrott =

British conductor (born 1947)

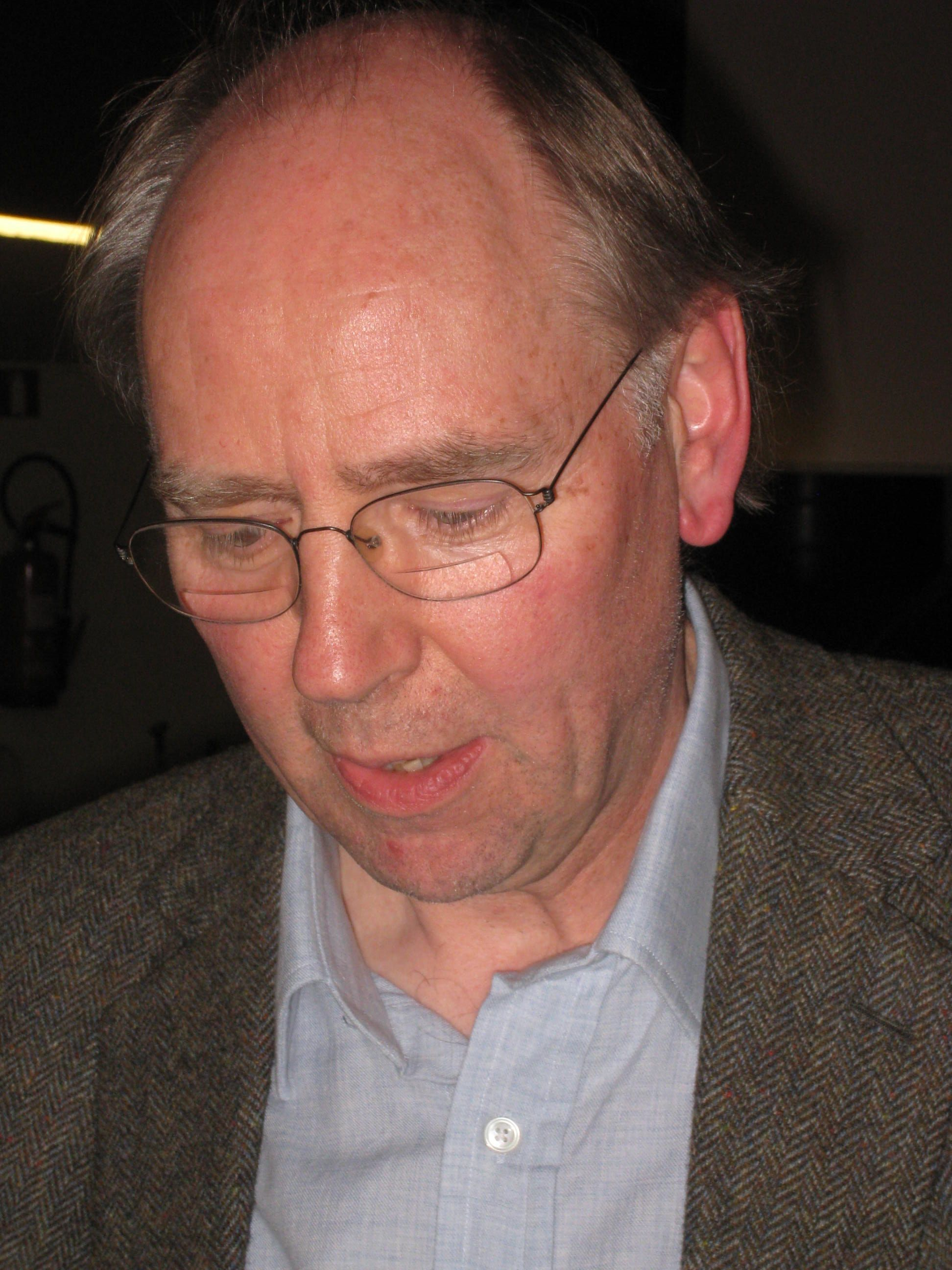
Andrew Parrott, 2008

Andrew Haden Parrott (born 10 March 1947) is a British conductor, scholar and writer, best known for his involvement with ‘early’ music and, in particular, with historical performance practices.

Following a degree in music and postgraduate research at the University of Oxford – where he conducted Schola Cantorum of Oxford – Parrott founded the Taverner Choir, Consort & Players in 1973, which celebrated their 50th anniversary in 2023. Under his direction these groups developed and extended their repertoire to become a major performing and recording presence in the classical music world of the 1980s and ’90s.

Parrott succeeded John Beckett as conductor of Michael Morrow’s Musica Reservata in 1973, and from 1999 to 2006 he was music director of London Mozart Players, and from 2001 to 2010 of New York Collegium (New York City). Since 2006 he has served as honorary conductor of Jerusalem Baroque Orchestra.

As a freelance musician, Andrew Parrott has worked with a variety of musical forces, from mixed ‘Renaissance’ ensembles to period-instrument ‘baroque’ and ‘classical’ orchestras, from mainstream chamber and symphony orchestras to ‘new music’ configurations, and in opera. With Ronald Brautigam as soloist, he has recorded all of Beethoven’s music for piano and orchestra (for Sweden’s BIS Records label), and he conducted both the premiere and the first recording of Judith Weir’s A Night at the Chinese Opera (with Kent Opera and Scottish Chamber Orchestra, respectively). Also, in Slovakia, he has recorded major works by living composer Vladimír Godár.

== Taverner Choir, Consort & Players ==
From a ‘pioneering’ LP record of music by Giovanni Gabrieli, the Taverner groups under Parrott went on to achieve international acclaim for a series of recordings for EMI, including ‘Una ‘Stravaganza dei Medici’ - The 1589 Florentine Intermedi’ (1988), and albums featuring music by Machaut, Thomas Tallis, Monteverdi, Henry Purcell, J. S. Bach, Handel, and Arvo Pärt. More recent recordings on the Avie label include his own pioneering reconstruction of Bach’s ‘lost’ Trauer-Music for Prince Leopold, Monteverdi’s opera L’Orfeo, and Taverner’s ‘Western Wind’ Mass (Gramophone Award 2016).

== Scholar & writer ==
Parrott has at all stages of his career sought to engage with both scholars and performers, and to put the fruit of his thinking and research into the public domain. After co-editing the New Oxford Book of Carols (1992) with Hugh Keyte,

Parrott produced two books, The Essential Bach Choir (2000) and Composers’ Intentions? (2015),

each reflecting his ‘authoritative, provocative, and readable’ approach and research into overlooked or misunderstood matters of performance practice.

Similar documentary work has culminated in what has been described as a ‘uniquely capacious cornucopia’, The Pursuit of Musick (2022), a tome which presents multiple facets of European musical life c1200–1770 by means of innumerable original writings and more than 500 images.

== Bibliography ==
- Keyte, H. And Parrott, A. (1998): The New Oxford Book of Carols. Oxford: Oxford University Press. ISBN 978-0-19-353323-3
- Parrott, A. (2000): The Essential Bach Choir. Woodbridge: Boydell & Brewer. ISBN 0-85115-786-6
- Parrott, A. (2015): Composers’ Intentions? Lost Traditions of Musical Performance. Woodbridge: Boydell & Brewer. ISBN 978-1-783-27032-3
- Parrott, A. (2022): The Pursuit of Musick: Musical Life in Original Writings and Art c1200–1770. Taverner. ISBN 978-1-915-22953-3
