= Carl Hardebeck =

Irish composer

Carl Gilbert Hardebeck or Carl G. Hardebec (10 December 1869 – 10 February 1945) was a British-born Irish composer and arranger of traditional music.

== Biography ==
Hardebeck, whose father was German and mother was Welsh, was born in Clerkenwell, London. He lost his sight when he was a baby. He attended the Royal Normal School for the Blind in London (1880–1892) where, under his teacher Frederick Corder (a professor from the Royal Academy of Music), he showed a marked aptitude for music.

In 1893, at the age of twenty-four, he moved to Belfast, where he opened a music store, but the venture failed, and he became the organist of a small parish in the city, the Holy Family Church, Wellington Place. He entered an anthem, O God of My Salvation for contralto and chorus, for the 1897 Dublin Feis Ceoil and won; on this occasion he heard folk song arrangements of Charles Villiers Stanford and others for the first time. At the 1901 Feis Ceoil, he again won a prize, this time for a large cantata, The Red Hand of Ulster. In 1914 Mary Reavy, Hardeback's wife died.

In 1919, he was to become the director of the music school in Cork and became the first professor of Irish music at University College Cork in 1922. Ill-suited for administrative tasks, he relinquished the post after one year and returned to Belfast, which after the Irish Civil War had become the capital of Northern Ireland. In 1932, he finally settled in Dublin, where he worked for An Gúm, the Irish government publisher, as arranger of Irish traditional songs for piano and choirs, many of which became teaching material at schools in the nascent Republic of Ireland. He also taught Irish and traditional music in the Dublin Municipal School of Music for two years. On many occasions he acted as adjudicator in singing and musical competitions across Ireland.

Despite his mixed German/Welsh/English background, the events of the 1913 Dublin Lock-out, the outbreak of World War I, and the 1916 Easter Rising radicalised him, turning him into an Irish nationalist. He was quoted as saying "I believe in God, Beethoven and Patrick Pearse". He studied the Irish language and collected folk songs from around the country, making some unique arrangements that bridged the gap between traditional and art song.

When Hardebeck died in 1945, a Radio Éireann-sponsored symphony concert, held in the Capitol Theatre in Dublin, began with a sympathetic performance of his orchestral variations upon Seoithín Seó. A state funeral was held in Saint Joseph's Church, Berkeley Road, Dublin. The church was packed; various government ministers, the Lord Mayor and representatives of the President and of Éamon de Valera were there. Hardebeck's own Kyrie and Agnus Dei were performed at the requiem mass. He was interred in Glasnevin Cemetery, where a Benedictus was chanted by the clergy present. A vote of sympathy was issued by the Irish National League of the Blind to Hardebeck's widow and relatives, in which the hope was expressed "that the nation as a whole would not be unmindful of the important contribution which the late Dr Hardebeck had made to Irish culture, music and art".

== Appearance and personality ==
The following anecdotes are based on Gannon (2006); see Bibliography: Although a huge, well-built man, he was shy and retiring by nature. If it were not for his bald head and the forbidding round dark glasses that he always wore, he could have been described as a handsome man. In later life he had bronchitis, and the present of a bottle of whiskey, which would "loosen him out", was always welcome. He spoke with a distinct Northern Irish accent and addressed everyone as "boss". "If I had my sight, boss", he would say, "I'd be conducting an orchestra on a cruiser." At one time he played the organ in Saint Mathew's Church, Belfast. As there was an icy draught in the church, his bald head felt cold. Carl asked for and received permission to wear a priest's black beretta, which confused everyone.

At home in Dublin, he played his excellent arrangements of Irish melodies on a Schiedmayer harmonium. The instrument had a 'percussion' stop, which Carl used to great effect. Carl also owned a Knauss piano, but played the harmonium by choice. He was quite an authority on plainchant. The noted Irish harpsichord maker, Cathal Gannon was a close friend of his for many years; Carl taught him how to appreciate the structure of the classical symphony and concerto and passed on his enthusiasm and love of Irish melodies.

== Recognition ==
Unfortunately, very little attention has been given to Hardebeck, who was one of the instigators in the revival of Irish music; indeed he was largely forgotten about after his death. This was possibly due to his mixed origins and place of birth. His arrangement for orchestra of The Lark in the Clear Air was a fine piece of music, but he was content to sell it to the music publishers Boosey & Hawkes for just six guineas.

In June 2013, a plaque to his memory was installed at Holy Family Church, Belfast; see ceremony at Youtube.

== Selected compositions ==
Cantata

- The Red Hand of Ulster for soloists, chorus and orchestra (1901)

Songs, with piano accompaniment

- Nualldhubhadh Dhéirdre / Deirdre's Lament (Irish words and English translation by Hardebeck) (Dublin: Pigott & Co., 1904)
- Gems of Melody (Seóda Ceoil). A Collection of Old Irish Airs (English words by various authors, Irish words by Tadhg Ó Donnchadha); vol. 1: Dublin, Pohlmann (1908); vol. 2: Dublin, Pigott (n.d. [after 1910]); vol. 3: Belfast, Carl G. Hardebeck (n.d. [c.1915])
- Fuinn Fiadha Fuinidh (words [in Irish] by Fhionán Mac Coluim), two vols. (Dublin: Oifig Díolta Foillseacháin Rialtais, 1936)
- The Ould Piper (original composition, English words)
- The Foggy Dew (words by "Iascaire") (Dublin: Whelan & Son, c.1919); score online
- Maidin ar an Drúcht (trad.), folksong arrangement (Dublin: Oifig Díolta Foillseacháin Rialtais, 1936)
- Éirigh Suas, a Stóirín (trad.), folksong arrangement (Dublin: Oifig Díolta Foillseacháin Rialtais, 1940)

Choral

- Raftery, the Poet. Original unaccompanied chorus for male voices (translation by Máire bean Hardebec) (London: Vincent Music Co., 1913)
- Och, Och, Eirigh Leigeas Ó! (trad.), folksong arrangement for 3 equal voices (Dublin: Oifig Díolta Foillseacháin Rialtais, 1937)
- Frínseach Tighe Róin (trad.), folksong arrangement for 4-part mixed choir (Dublin: Oifig Díolta Foillseacháin Rialtais, 1938)

Instrumental music

- Cnuasacht Port agus Cor do'n bPiano (A Collection of Jigs and Reels for the Piano), 2 vols. (Dublin: Sullivan & Co., 1921); score online: volume 1 and volume 2
- Ceol na nGaedheal for flute or tin whistle (Dublin: Brown & Nolan, 1937; printed in tonic sol-fa only); score online
- Seoithín seó for small orchestra (published Dublin: Oifig Díolta Foilseacháin Rialtais, 1950)

== Recordings ==
- Dómhnaillín Ó Dómhnalláin, Roisín Dubh, Sile ni Gadhra, performed by Veronica Dunne (S), Tomás Ó Súilleabháin (Bar), Irish Festival Singers, Kitty O'Callaghan (cond.), on: Angel ANG 65016, LP (1955).
- The Song of Glen Dún, performed by Bernadette Greevy (mezzo) and Jeannie Reddin (piano), on: Spoken Arts SA 219, LP (c. 1963); re-issued on: Argo RG 459 (mono) & ZRG 459 (stereo), LP (1966).
- Frinseach Tighe Roin, Seo-Tho-lo-Thoil, Luibin O Luth, Sile ni Ghadhra, performed by RTÉ Singers, Hans Waldemar Rosen (cond.), on: Harmonia Mundi HMS 30691, LP (1965).
- Shaun O'Neill, performed by Veronica Dunne (soprano) and Havelock Nelson (piano), on: EMI-Columbia SCX 6272, LP (1968); re-issued on EMI 0946 3 35948 2 1, CD (2005).
- The Song of Glen Dún, A Dandlin' Song, performed by Bernadette Greevy (mezzo) and Hugh Tinney (piano), on: Marco Polo 8.225098, CD (1998).
- The Coulin, Ned of the Hills, Drumin Don Deelish, performed by Michael McFarlane (baritone) and Brian Taylor (piano), on: Parlor Discs [no catalogue number; "McCormack – Off the Record Volume I"], CD (2005).
- Sal Oge Ruadh, The Red-Haired Man's Wife, performed by Michael McFarlane (baritone) and Ye Yan Shao (piano), on: Parlor Discs [no catalogue number; "McCormack – Off the Record Volume II"], CD (2007).
- The Fair Hills of Eire O, The Unspoken Farewell, Una Bhan (Fair Una), performed by Michael McFarlane (baritone) and Yiyan Shao (piano), on: Parlor Discs [no catalogue number; "McCormack – Off the Record Volume III"], CD (2010).

== In other media ==
Though uncredited, Carl Hardebeck's satirical ballad The Ould Piper is featured prominently in Pasolini's film The Canterbury Tales. It is played over the opening credits and hummed frequently by Ninetto Davoli in his segment. The ballad is about an old piper from Ballymoney named Allen Hoare, who manages to annoy both Moses and Satan with his terrible singing.

== Bibliography ==
- "Hardebeck". Contributions by Germaine Stockley, Michael Bowles, James Campbell, Aloys Fleischmann, John F. Larchet, Frederick May, Seán Neeson, Seán O'Boyle, Vincent O'Brien, Cathal O'Byrne, J.J. O'Connor, and Fr Senan, prefixed by a short autobiographical article by Hardebeck; in: The Capuchin Annual (1943) p. 220–238.
- Thomas MacGreevy: "Carl Hardebeck", in: Father Matthew Record, March 1947, p. 2; see article online.
- Seán O'Boyle: "Carl Hardebeck", in: The Capuchin Annual (1948), p. 80–87.
- Axel Klein: Die Musik Irlands im 20. Jahrhundert (Hildesheim: Georg Olms Verlag, 1996), ISBN 3-487-10196-3.
- Gregory Allen: "The Blind Bard of Belfast: Carl Gilbert Hardebeck", in: History Ireland 6 (1998), autumn issue, p. 38–43; see article online.
- Charles Gannon: Cathal Gannon – The Life and Times of a Dublin Craftsman 1910–1999 (Dublin: Lilliput Press, 2006), ISBN 1-84351-086-3. cathalgannon at eircom
