= The Art of Courtly Love (box set) =

The original LP box for The Art of Courtly Love

The Art of Courtly Love is a 1973 3-LP box set recorded by The Early Music Consort of London, directed by David Munrow for EMI Classics. The set includes 51 medieval and early renaissance songs, most of them little known in 1973. The album won the 1977 Grammy Award for Best Chamber Music Performance.
