= Michael Morrow =

Irish artist, ornithologist, musician and musicologist (1929 - 1994)

- Born: 2 October 1929
- Origin: London, England
- Died: 20 April 1994 (aged 64) Hampstead, London, England
- Genres: Early music
- Occupations: Musician, music director
- Instruments: Lute, recorder
- Years active: 30
- Labels: Vox, Argo, Delysé, Philips, Decca, Vanguard, Boston Skyline

Michael Morrow (2 October 1929 – 20 April 1994) was an Irish artist, ornithologist, musician and musicologist who, together with John Beckett, founded the British early music group Musica Reservata in London during the late 1950s. He directed the group, which became famous for its ground-breaking and vigorous approach to performing Medieval and early Renaissance music, until it was disbanded in the 1980s.

== Beginnings ==
Norman Michael MacNamara Morrow was born on 2 October 1929, in London, to his Irish parents Larry and Léonie Morrow. His formal education began in Dublin, when he was sent to St Andrew's school in Clyde Road. However, as Michael suffered from Christmas disease, a form of haemophilia, he had to be educated at home.

Between 1946 and 1947, the family lived in London, where Michael attended the Hammersmith School of Art. When the family returned to Dublin and lived in Fitzwilliam Square, Michael continued his studies at the National College of Art. The family then moved to Belfast, where he attended the Belfast College of Art. After about six months he returned to the National College of Art in Dublin, where one of his classmates was Beatrice ffrench-Salkeld, daughter of the avant-garde artist Cecil ffrench-Salkeld. Beatrice later married the Irish writer and playwright, Brendan Behan. A little later, Beatrice's sister Celia dated the artist Reginald Gray, who was also a friend of Michael's. Michael taught Reginald and Celia to play the recorder.

Michael also befriended John ffrench, whose work was exhibited with Beatrice and Michael's. John lived at Castleffrench, near Ballinasloe in the West of Ireland. As Michael had developed an interest in ornithology and falconry, he spent time at Castleffrench, where he painted, played music and hawked.

Michael eventually rejoined his family, who now had moved back to Fitzwilliam Square. After a couple of years the family left and moved to a house on Strand Road at Merrion, overlooking Dublin bay. At this point, in 1950, Michael met the young musician and harpsichord player John Beckett in the National Library of Ireland. This chance meeting would, in time, alter the course of both young men's lives.

Having won the Henry Higgins Travelling Scholarship while studying in the National College of Art, Michael spent a year in Munich, Paris and Florence, where he shared a pension with John ffrench. He returned to Dublin in September 1952 with Werner Schürmann, a sculptor and singer whom he had met in Munich. In 1953, Michael accompanied the tenor John Bilton on lute for four twenty-minute radio programmes, devised and presented by John Beckett, entitled John Dowland's Achievement as a Song Writer. These were broadcast in July and August on Radio Éireann. Later in the year he designed scenery for the new Pike Theatre Club, Dublin, founded by Alan Simpson and Carolyn Swift. It was hoped that the tiny theatre would stage the first performance of Samuel Beckett's play Waiting for Godot, but this was not to be; it was finally performed in the Pike in October 1955.

== Move to London ==
As there was little or no work for Michael in Dublin, he finally left for England at the end of 1953, and settled down in Hampstead, where John Beckett was now living.

At some time during this period, Michael and John Beckett worked in Forte's Monaco restaurant in Piccadilly Circus, famous for its musical fountain. When not operating the fountain, Michael spent his time transcribing old music from a variety of sources found in libraries and museums in London. When in Dublin, he had studied important manuscripts in Marsh's Library and Trinity College, especially ones containing lute music. He now became interested in music of the thirteenth century and onwards, which meant that he had to teach himself various systems of notation to transcribe pieces into modern notation.

== Musica Reservata ==
During the mid 1950s, Michael, John Beckett and the recorder player John Sothcott played together and discussed medieval and early Renaissance music in various Hampstead coffee bars. Michael was determined to inject more life and vigour into their performances, in contrast to the accepted style of the period. This decision was based on his observations when listening to European and non-European folk music, in which medieval traditions of singing and playing had been preserved. Michael, the two Johns and the counter-tenor Grayston Burgess often played and rehearsed either in Michael's flat or in a converted chapel at 17 Holly Mount, Hampstead, which was owned by Heinz and Ruth Liebrecht.

Towards the end of 1959, Michael married Hedy Pelc. She came from an Austrian Jewish family that had moved to England in 1938. Hedy lived in Hampstead, and she and Michael had met through a mutual friend. After they had married, they shared a flat with John Beckett and his wife Vera in Frognal. Later they moved and finally settled in 9 Aberdare Gardens, Hampstead.

The first proper public concert given by Musica Reservata took place in Fenton House, Hampstead on 30 January 1960. Many more concerts followed, including one in the Wigmore Hall on 26 June 1963, and most importantly, the so-called 'début' concert held in the Queen Elizabeth Hall, on the South Bank, which took place on 2 July 1967. The group shot to fame after this and thereafter it was frequently engaged for concerts and recordings; see the separate entry Musica Reservata.

In the early 1970s, tension began to grow between Morrow (who was disorganised by nature) and Beckett, and soon a rift began to appear in the relationship. By the end of 1973, John left Musica Reservata, though he never lost his admiration for Michael. Andrew Parrott then conducted the group until it was disbanded in the 1980s.

== Death ==
Michael Morrow died on 20 April 1994 from Hepatitis C. John Beckett attended his funeral at Golders Green Crematorium, where he made an impromptu speech in praise of his friend. In July 1995, a 'Colloquium on Early Music in Memory of Michael Morrow' was held in Heinz and Ruth Liebrecht's house in Hampstead. The theme was New Thoughts about Old Music. Lasting one day, it consisted of talks given by Margaret Bent, David Fallows, Tess Knighton, Warwick Edwards and Christopher Page.

== Further reading and available sources ==
- BBC Written Archives Centre, Caversham, Reading, UK: Artists: Musica Reservata file I 1958–1962; Musica Reservata artists file II 1963–1967; RCONT12 Musica Reservata artists file II 1968–1972; RCONT31/86/1 Musica Reservata Orchestra.
- British Library Sound Archive, Saint Pancras, London: records (LPs, CDs) and BBC radio programmes of music performed by Musica Reservata.
- Early Music magazine (UK): Musica Reservata (Vol. 4, No. 4, October 1976, pp. 515–521); Michael Morrow: Musical Performance and Authenticity (Vol. 6, No. 2, April 1978, pp. 233–246); Michael Morrow obituary (Vol. 22, No. 3, August 1994, pp. 537–9). Available on JSTOR.
- Fallows, David: Musica Reservata, The New Grove Dictionary of Music and Musicians, Stanlie Sadie (ed.), p. 827. London: 1980, Macmillan, reprinted 1986.
- King's College London, College Archives: Morrow, Michael (1929–94) and Musica Reservata, GB 0100 KCLCA K/PP93 (13 boxes).
- Medieval.org's online Musica Reservata discography.
- Royal Academy of Music, London: Michael Morrow papers (uncatalogued).
- Semibrevity website: Balkan voices and medieval music in the work of Michael Morrow and Musica Reservata by Edward Breen.
- Edward Breen (June 2016). "Travel in Space, Travel in Time: Michael Morrow's Approach to Performing Medieval Music in the 1960s". In Fugelso, Karl; Salih, Sarah; Davies, Joshua (eds.). Medievalism & Modernity. Boydell & Brewer. pp. 89/113. ISBN 9781843844372.
