= Christopher Hogwood =

English conductor and musicologist (1941–2014)

Christopher Hogwood CBE
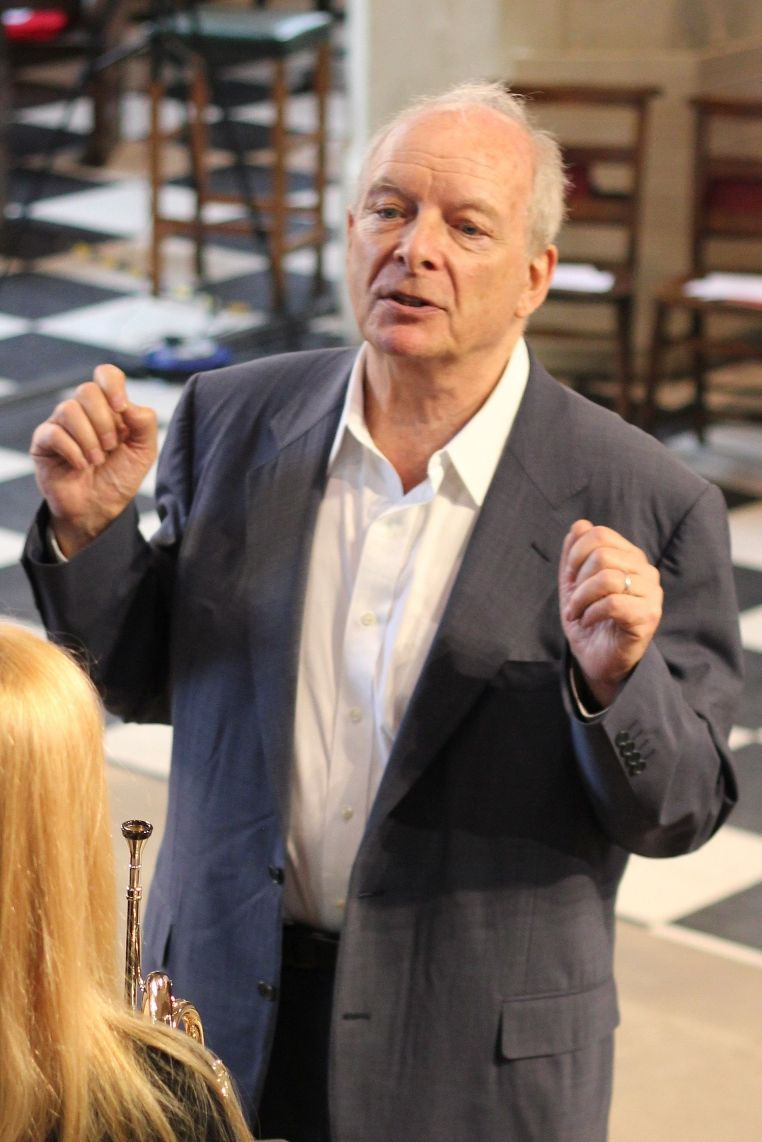
- Hogwood leading rehearsals for his final Gresham College lecture in 2014
- Born: Christopher Jarvis Haley Hogwood; 10 September 1941; Nottingham, Nottinghamshire, England
- Died: 24 September 2014 (aged 73); Cambridge, Cambridgeshire, England
- Occupations: Conductor; Harpsichordist; Musicologist
- Organization: Academy of Ancient Music

Christopher Jarvis Haley Hogwood CBE (10 September 1941 – 24 September 2014) was an English conductor, harpsichordist, and musicologist. Founder of the early music ensemble the Academy of Ancient Music, he was an authority on historically informed performance and a leading figure in the early music revival of the late 20th century.

== Early life and education ==
Born in Nottingham, Hogwood went to The Skinners' School, Royal Tunbridge Wells, and then studied Music and Classics at Pembroke College, Cambridge, graduating in 1964. Contemporaries at Cambridge included David Munrow and John Turner. He went on to study performance and conducting under Raymond Leppard, Mary Potts and Thurston Dart, and later with Rafael Puyana and Gustav Leonhardt. He also studied in Prague with Zuzana Ruzickova for a year, under a British Council scholarship.

== Career ==
In 1967, Hogwood co-founded the Early Music Consort with David Munrow. In 1973 he founded the Academy of Ancient Music, which specializes in performances of Baroque and Classical music using period instruments. The Early Music Consort was disbanded following Munrow's death in 1976, but Hogwood continued to perform and record with the Academy of Ancient Music.

Beginning in 1979, Hogwood and the academy recorded the first cycle of Mozart's symphonies to be performed on period instruments, with Hogwood in the role of continuist. In 1985, Hogwood's recording of Vivaldi's The Four Seasons on L'Oiseau-Lyre, which rubbed shoulders in the pop charts with Prince's Purple Rain; the latter was named best film soundtrack at the Brit Awards, while Hogwood's disc was best classical recording.

From 1981, Hogwood conducted regularly in the United States. He was Artistic Director of Boston's Handel and Haydn Society from 1986 to 2001, and for the remainder of his life held the title of Conductor Laureate. From 1983 to 1985 he was artistic director of the Mostly Mozart Festival in the Barbican Centre in London. From 1988 to 1992, he was musical director of the Saint Paul Chamber Orchestra in Minnesota.

In 1994 he conducted the Handel and Haydn Society in a recreation of the concert that premiered Beethoven's Sixth and Fifth symphonies for the Historic Keyboard Society of Milwaukee.

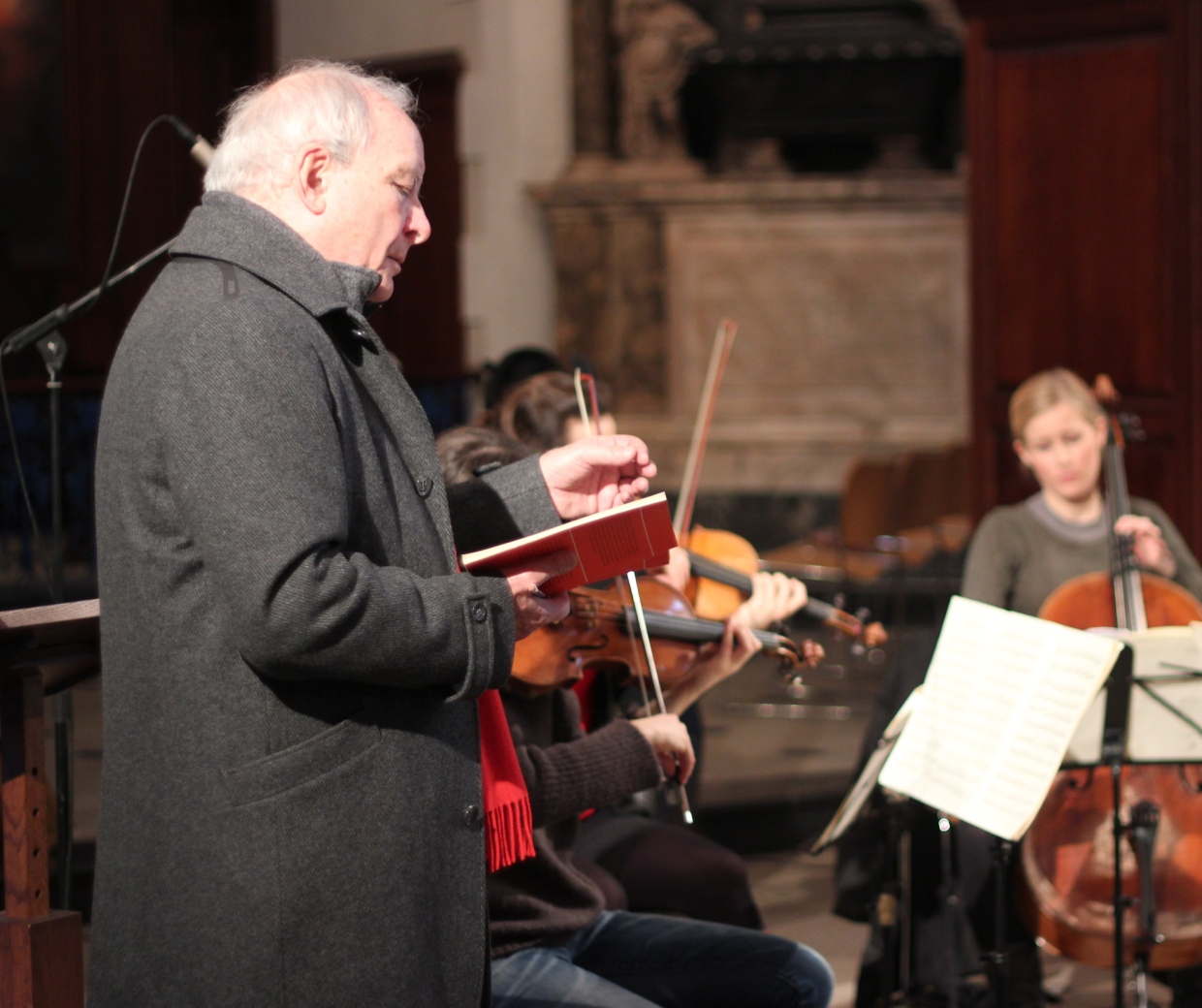
Hogwood leading a rehearsal for his Gresham College lecture in 2013

Hogwood conducted a considerable amount of opera. He made his operatic debut in 1983, conducting Mozart's Don Giovanni in St. Louis, Missouri. He worked with Berlin State Opera; La Scala, Milan; Royal Swedish Opera; the Royal Opera House at Covent Garden, Chorégies d'Orange and Houston Grand Opera. With Opera Australia, he performed Mozart operas, Idomeneo in 1994 and La clemenza di Tito in 1997. In 2009, he returned to the Royal Opera House to conduct the Orchestra of the Age of Enlightenment in Purcell's Dido and Aeneas, and Handel's Acis and Galatea. 2009 also saw him conducting Stravinsky's The Rake's Progress at the Teatro Real in Madrid, in a production directed by Robert Lepage. In late 2010 and early 2011, he conducted a series of performances of Mozart's Le nozze di Figaro at the Zurich Opera House.

On 1 September 2006, harpsichordist Richard Egarr succeeded Hogwood as music director of the Academy of Ancient Music and Hogwood assumed the title of Emeritus Director. Hogwood said he expected to conduct 'at least one major project' with the academy each year. He conducted them in a series of concert performances of Handel operas which began in 2007 with Amadigi di Gaula. 2008 saw performances of Flavio, and the series concluded in May 2009, the Handel anniversary, with Arianna in Creta. In 2013 he conducted Imeneo.

Although Hogwood was best known for the baroque and classical repertoire, he also performed romantic and contemporary music, with a particular affinity for the neobaroque and neoclassical schools including many works by Stravinsky, Martinů and Hindemith.

He made many solo recordings of harpsichord works (including Louis Couperin, J. S. Bach, Thomas Arne, William Byrd's My Ladye Nevells Booke), and did much to promote the clavichord in the Secret Bach/Handel/Mozart series of recordings, which puts in historical context the most common domestic instrument of that epoch. He owned a collection of historical keyboard instruments.

In July 2010, he was appointed Professor of Music at Gresham College, London, a position originally held by John Bull. In this role he delivered four series of free public lectures on Aspects of Authenticity (2010–11), The Making of a Masterpiece (2011–12), European Capitals of Music (2012–13) and Music in Context (2013–14). He was unable to deliver all of his lectures during his final year of appointment due to illness and it was only seven months after his final lecture at the college that he died.

In 2011 Hogwood was a juror for the Westfield International Fortepiano Competition hosted at Cornell University. This was the first fortepiano competition in the United States and only the second competition of its kind in the world. In 2012 he was appointed Andrew D. White Professor-at-Large at Cornell University, for a six-year term of office. He was a member of Lowell House Senior Common Room in Harvard University.

=== Editing ===
Hogwood's editing work included music by composers as diverse as John Dowland and Felix Mendelssohn. After John Walsh's collection The Harpsichord Master Book I was rediscovered in New Zealand in 1977 (containing two otherwise new/unknown works by Purcell), Hogwood edited the re-issue on Oxford University Press reissue in 1980. He was the chairman of the new edition Carl Philipp Emanuel Bach: The Complete Works, which aimed to publish a complete edition of C.P.E. Bach's music in 2014.

He was involved with The Wranitzky Project, dedicated to the study and publishing of the music of Moravian composer Paul Wranitzky (1756–1808). His last editing project was a complete critical edition of piano sonatas by the Czech composer Leopold Koželuch.

=== Brahms "discovery" ===
In 2012 Hogwood's musicological activities came to the attention of a wider public when the BBC and the Guardian newspaper announced his discovery of a "previously unknown" piano piece by Johannes Brahms. However, it emerged that the work in question, entitled Albumblatt, was already known. The manuscript had been sold at public auction in April 2011, where it was described as "unpublished" and "of great importance," and the manuscript was reproduced in full in the catalogue. The work had been given its premiere by Craig Sheppard on 28 April 2011. Sheppard reportedly described the claim that Hogwood discovered the work as "fatuous". However, Hogwood was involved in the publication of the piece by editing it for Bärenreiter. The Albumblatt was published in February 2012 along with a more substantial work, the Horn Trio in E-flat major, Op. 40, to which it is thematically related.

== Death ==
Hogwood died in Cambridge on 24 September 2014, fourteen days after his 73rd birthday, from a brain tumour. Shortly before his death, he had separated from his civil partner, the film director Anthony Fabian.

== Honours ==
In 1989 Hogwood was appointed a Commander of the Order of the British Empire (CBE).

He was a recipient of the Halle Handel Prize in 2008. In 2011 he was awarded the IRC Harrison Medal of the Society for Musicology in Ireland.

At the time of his death, Hogwood was Honorary Professor of Music in the University of Cambridge, Consultant Visiting professor of Historical Performance in the Royal Academy of Music and visiting professor of music at King's College London. He was honorary fellow of both Jesus College, Cambridge and Pembroke College, Cambridge.

== Awards ==
- Fellow of the Royal Society of Arts (FRSA) 1982
- Walter Willson Cobbett Medal from the Worshipful Company of Musicians 1986
- Honorary Fellow of Jesus College, Cambridge 1989
- Freeman of the Worshipful Company of Musicians 1989
- Commander of the Most Excellent Order of the British Empire (CBE) 1989
- Honorary Doctor of Music Keele University 1991
- Honorary Fellow of Pembroke College, Cambridge 1992
- Finalist Giovanni Comisso Prize for Biographies 1992
- Hon RAM Royal Academy of Music 1995
- Scotland on Sunday Music Prize Edinburgh International Festival 1996
- Award for Artistic Excellence University of California 1996
- Distinguished Musician Award Incorporated Society of Musicians 1997
- Martinů Medal Bohuslav Martinů Foundation, Prague 1999
- Honorary Doctorate University of Zurich 2007
- Honorary Doctor of Music University of Cambridge 2008
- Handel Prize, Halle 2008
- Irish Research Council Harrison Medal of the Society for Musicology in Ireland 2011
- Honorary Doctor of Music Royal College of Music 2013

Hogwood's Mozart recordings were widely acclaimed, and his interpretations of Mozart's symphonies, Requiem and La clemenza di Tito were all nominated for Grammy Awards, from 1982 to 1996.

== Bibliography ==
- Hogwood, Christopher (1977). Music at Court. Folio Society. ISBN 978-0-575-02877-7.
- —— (1979). The Trio Sonata (Music Guides). BBC Books. ISBN 978-0-563-17095-2.
- —— (1984). Handel. Thames & Hudson. ISBN 978-0-500-27498-9.
- —— (2005). Handel: Water Music and Music for the Royal Fireworks (Cambridge Music Handbooks). Cambridge University Press. ISBN 978-0-521-54486-3.

Cultural offices
Preceded by no predecessor	Music Director, Academy of Ancient Music; 1973–2006	Succeeded by Richard Egarr
Preceded by Thomas Dunn	Music Director, Handel and Haydn Society; 1986–2001	Succeeded by Grant Llewellyn
