= Musica Reservata (group) =

Musica Reservata was an early music group founded in London in the late 1950s by two Irish musicians and early music scholars Michael Morrow and John Beckett.

== Beginnings ==
Michael Morrow and John Beckett left Dublin for London in late 1953 and settled in Hampstead. Morrow, who originally was interested in art, had become interested in early music and had learned to play the lute. In his spare time, he began to transcribe old music from a variety of sources found in libraries and museums in London. Over the years he became a formidable musicologist and scholar. As he had become rather dissatisfied by the performances of early music on gramophone records and the BBC Third Programme, he turned his attention to European and non-European folk and art music, in which he believed medieval traditions had been preserved. He was also aware that many of the instruments used in medieval and Renaissance music had been brought to Europe from the east, as a result of the Crusades, trade through Constantinople and the Moorish occupation of Spain. He also believed that voice production had been eastern and folksy; in European religious paintings, angels were frequently depicted singing with tightened throats and mouths barely open. He therefore felt that much of the music of the medieval and early Renaissance periods should be performed in a more brash manner than what we are used to in modern times, though he was aware that any attempt to perform this music in a definitive 'authentic' manner was next to impossible.

Morrow decided to call his group Musica Reservata because he considered it to be unlikely that any performance of early music could be a true reproduction of the original sounds. According to Morrow, the name summed up the problems encountered when performing early music.

The group evolved during the 1950s; at first Morrow, Beckett and the recorder player John Sothcott performed privately, sometimes with the counter-tenor Grayston Burgess. One of the first concerts was a performance for The Fellowship of the White Boar, later renamed The Richard III Society.

== First public concert ==
The first proper public concert took place in Fenton House, Hampstead, on 30 January 1960. A programme of medieval music was performed by Grayston Burgess (counter-tenor), Eric Halfpenny (early cross flute), John Sothcott (recorder), June Baines (tenor viol), John Beckett (tenor viol and regal), Francis Baines (hurdy-gurdy and bagpipes), Michael Morrow (lute) and Jeremy Montagu (percussion). The music consisted of pieces by Dufay, Binchois, Dunstable, Ockeghem, Landini and de Lantins.

== Other concerts ==
More small-scale concerts followed; the next important one was a programme of medieval, Renaissance (and contemporary) music given in the Wigmore Hall, London on 26 June 1963. This was the first concert in which the mezzo-soprano Jantina Noorman performed. Her unique voice added a very distinctive flavour to the overall sound of the group.

Early music performer David Munrow may have played the crumhorn for the first time with Musica Reservata at a concert held at Balliol College in Oxford on 28 November 1965. He later left the group and founded the Early Music Consort of London.

The group became known after a 'début' concert, given in the Queen Elizabeth Hall on the South Bank in London, on 2 July 1967. Six solo singers and twenty-four musicians, conducted by John Beckett, performed music of the Italian Renaissance in the first half, and music of the thirteenth- and fourteenth-century France and early sixteenth-century Spain in the second. From this point onwards, the group was regularly engaged for concerts, LPs were recorded and radio programmes were made for the BBC Third Programme/Radio 3.

As well as performing in England, the group also played in Ireland, France, the Netherlands, Belgium, Germany, Austria, Portugal, and later, when John Beckett left the group and Andrew Parrott took over, in the USSR.

== Discography (arranged in approximate chronological order) ==
- 1966: Music of the Early Renaissance: John Dunstable and his Contemporaries, Purcell Consort of Voices and Musica Reservata, conducted by Grayston Burgess; Vox Turnabout.
- 1968: To Entertain a King: Music for Henry VIII and his Court (also Music to Entertain a King and Music to Entertain Henry VIII), Purcell Consort of Voices and Musica Reservata, cond. Grayston Burgess; Argo.
- 1968: French Court Music of the Thirteenth Century, Musica Reservata, cond. John Beckett; Delysé, Everest, L’Oiseau-Lyre, Musical Heritage Society.
- 1968: Music from the time of Christopher Columbus, Musica Reservata, cond. John Beckett; Philips.
- 1968: Metaphysical Tobacco: Songs and Dances by Dowland, East and Holborne, Musica Reservata, cond. John Beckett; Argo.
- 1968: Music from the 100 Years War, Musica Reservata, cond. John Beckett; Philips.
- 1970: Music from the time of Boccaccio’s Decameron, Musica Reservata, cond. John Beckett; Philips.
- 1970: Music from the Court of Burgundy, Musica Reservata, cond. John Beckett; Philips.
- 1971: A Florentine Festival, Musica Reservata, cond. John Beckett; Argo; Decca Serenata (1985); reissued in double-CD collection Early Music Festival, Decca (1998).
- 1972: Sixteenth Century Italian Dance Music, Musica Reservata, cond. John Beckett; Philips.
- 1972: Sixteenth Century French Dance Music, Musica Reservata, cond. John Beckett; Philips.
- 1970, 1979 (?): Musik der Renaissance, various artists including tracks from Music of the Early Renaissance: John Dunstable and his contemporaries, Purcell Consort of Voices and Musica Reservata, conducted by Grayston Burgess (1966); Vox (double LP, Germany).
- 1972: The Instruments of the Middle Ages and Renaissance, Musica Reservata, cond. John Beckett; Vanguard; Vanguard Classics (Omega) (CD, United States).
- 1973, 1987: Muziek voor kerk en kroeg... / Musik für Kirche und Keipe / Musique d’église et de taverne..., Musica Reservata, cond. John Beckett. Compilation of tracks from various Philips discs: Music from the time of Christopher Columbus, Music from the 100 Years War, Music from the time of Boccaccio’s Decameron and Music from the Court of Burgundy; Philips.
- 1976: Josquin des Prés, Musica Reservata, cond. Andrew Parrott; Argo.
- 1978: A Concert of Early Music, Musica Reservata, cond. John Beckett; Vanguard Classics; Vanguard (Omega) Classics (CD, 1998).
- c. 1980: Lieder und Tänze aus dem 13.–16. Jahrhundert, boxed set of five Philips LPs: Musik aus der Zeit Christoph Columbus, Musik aus dem Hundertjährigen Krieg, Musik aus der Zeit von Boccaccios Decamerone, Musik am Hofe von Burgund, Italienische Tanzmusik des 16. Jahrhunderts; Philips (Germany). UK edition named The Sounde of Musicke: Songs and Dances from the 13th to the 16th Centuries.
- 1992: Music from the time of Christopher Columbus, re-issue of 1968 recording; Philips CD.
- 1994: Sixteenth Century Italian and French Dance Music, Musica Reservata conducted by John Beckett. Compilation of tracks from Sixteenth Century Italian Dance Music (1971) and Sixteenth Century French Dance Music (1972); Boston Skyline CD (United States).
- 1998: Early Music Festival / Ein Fest mit Alter Musik / Festival de Musique ancienne, double CD compilation of 1. Ecco la primavera – Florentine Music of the 14th century, The Early Music Consort of London, directed by David Munrow, Argo and 2. A Florentine Festival, Musica Reservata, conducted by John Beckett; Argo; Decca London.
