= John S. Beckett =

Irish musician, composer and conductor (1927 - 2007)

John Stewart Beckett (5 February 1927 – 5 February 2007) was an Irish musician, composer and conductor; cousin of the famous writer and playwright Samuel Beckett.

== Youth and education ==
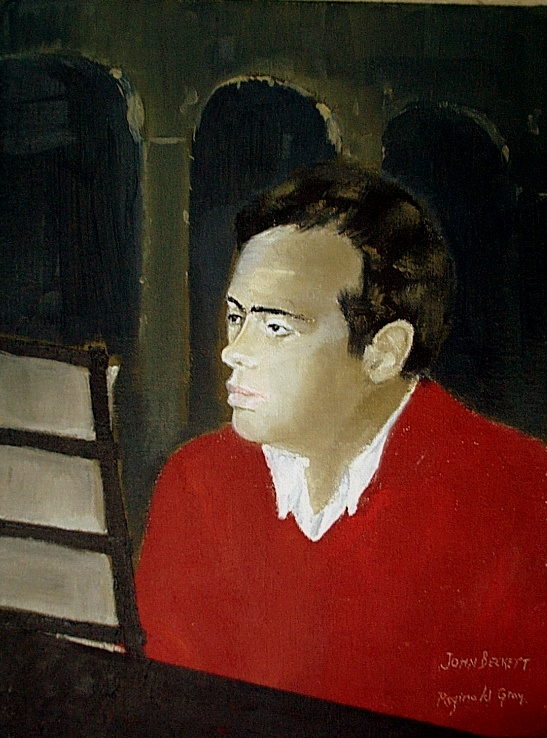
Portrait of John Beckett by Reginald Gray.1953. collection St.Columbas College. Dublin.

John and his twin sister Ann were born in Sandymount, Dublin to Gerald and Peggy Beckett. Gerald, brother of Bill Beckett (Samuel Beckett's father), studied medicine at Trinity College Dublin and became County Medical Officer for Wicklow.

Gerald Beckett played rugby for Ireland, and captained a golf club. A quiet man with wide interests, he was quite irreligious, with a dry sense of humour, describing life as "a disease of matter". He was very musical and enjoyed playing piano duets with a friend, David Owen Williams, who later became a director in the Guinness Brewery, and his son, John, and his nephew, Samuel Beckett. John's twin Ann later pioneered the profession of occupational therapy in Ireland becoming the country's first professionally qualified practitioner. and his older brother Peter became the first Professor of Psychiatry in Trinity College Dublin and later the Dean of Medicine at Trinity.

John Beckett attended St. Columba's College, Dublin, where he was taught music by Joe Groocock, whom he admired little short of idolatry, and who furthered his lifelong devotion to the music of Johann Sebastian Bach. (John shared the same initials, J. S. B., with the famous composer.) John wrote his first fugue at around the age of fourteen in the Groocock family home while visiting one weekend.

John Beckett's father's friend, David Owen Williams, who had served in Germany during World War II, brought home a complete set of vocal scores of Bach's Cantatas, which made a huge impression on John.

In 1933 the family moved to the Burnaby Estate, Greystones, County Wicklow. Gerald Beckett worked in Rathdrum, also in County Wicklow.

== Musical career ==
John received scholarships to study at the Royal Irish Academy of Music and the Royal College of Music in London. John went to London in 1945 and studied composition for three years — one of his teachers was Edmund Rubbra. He won a travelling scholarship and went to Paris in 1949, where he studied composition with Nadia Boulanger. He returned to Dublin in 1950 and his father died in September of that year.

Between 1950 and 1953, he befriended the pianist, organist and harpsichordist John O'Sullivan, the painter and musician Michael Morrow, the singer Werner Schürmann and the harpsichord maker Cathal Gannon (). In 1950, the Music Association of Ireland organised a bicentenary celebration of Bach's music, wherein John played the harpsichord continuo part in a performance, at the Dublin Metropolitan Hall of the Mass in B minor, sung by the Culwick Choral Society and the Radio Éireann Choir and conducted by Otto Matzerath (de:Otto Matzerath). The historic Weber harpsichord from the National Museum was used for the occasion.

John returned to London in 1953, but was back in Dublin again by 1958, when the first complete performance of Bach's St Matthew Passion took place with Victor Leeson conducting the St. James' Gate Musical Society. As it was believed that a harpsichord was not available, John played on a piano that had drawing pins attached to the hammers in order to give it a harpsichord-like sound. When the work was performed again the following year, using the same forces, Cathal Gannon's first harpsichord was used. The continuo part was played by John on the harpsichord and by Betty Sullivan on the cello – a collaboration that would last for many years.

In 1960, Musica Reservata, a group specialising in Renaissance music was founded in London by Michael Morrow, its director, and Beckett, who later conducted it. (). The group performed in England during the sixties and seventies and made many recordings, which are still available. In addition to being a keyboard player, John Beckett played the recorder and viol. He also composed much avant-garde music for the experimental dramas aired by the BBC's Third Programme. For his cousin, Samuel Beckett, he composed music for two of his works, his mime Act Without Words and his radio play Words and Music.

By 1961, John Beckett was involved in a serious car accident in Ireland, in which he broke his two arms, a hip and an ankle. While recovering in hospital, he practised his music on a clavichord made by his friend, Cathal Gannon. He returned to England, where he taught the recorder and had a viol consort class at the Chiswick Polytechnic, and in 1967 he acquired a Gannon harpsichord.

== Marriage and return to Dublin ==
In 1961 John had married Vera Slocombe, the former wife of cinematographer Douglas Slocombe, but the marriage broke up in 1969. In March 1970 he returned to Dublin, now with his partner, viola player Ruth David. They lived together in a very basic cottage at the foot of Djouce Mountain in County Wicklow.

From there he drove to the Royal Irish Academy of Music in Westland Row, where he taught the harpsichord and viol and directed a chamber music class. John's harpsichord students included Malcolm Proud and Emer Buckley . Other students who partook in the chamber music sessions, normally held in the Dagg Hall, included David Milne, John Milne, Clive Shannon, Patricia Quinn, Michael Dervan (later music critic of The Irish Times), Siobhán Yeats and even Liam Óg Ó Floinn, who played the uilleann pipes. The traditional fiddler, Nollaig Casey, also attended and Beckett always persuaded her to play an unaccompanied slow air at the class concerts. Sometimes a traditional flute player performed at the concerts, though he did not attend the class.

He composed a fine score for "Inis Fail" (Isle of Destiny), the first RTÉ/BBC co-production, an aerial journey around Ireland written and narrated by his friend James Plunkett, author of "Strumpet City". The songs were sung by Frank Patterson, Beckett himself conducted the RTÉ Symphony Orchestra, and the film was shown on St. Patrick's Day, 1971.

== The Bach Cantatas ==
The famous series of Bach cantatas, performed during February in St Ann's Church, Dawson Street, Dublin, under Beckett's direction, began in 1973 and lasted for ten years. The singers Frank Patterson, Bernadette Greevy, Irene Sandford and William Young were regular soloists. Nicholas Anderson of the BBC took a great interest in these Sunday afternoon concerts and several times recorded those cantatas that the BBC had not yet recorded for its complete series.

Because of this connection, the New Irish Chamber Orchestra and The Cantata Singers, conducted by John Beckett, were invited to perform an all-Bach concert at one of the Henry Wood Proms at the Royal Albert Hall on 22 July 1979. This was the first time an orchestra and choir from the Republic of Ireland performed in one of these Proms.

The Cantata series was revived several years after John left Ireland, with the Orchestra of Saint Cecilia (essentially the same personnel as the New Irish Chamber Orchestra), under the direction of Lindsay Armstrong ().

== Haydn, Purcell and the New Irish Chamber Orchestra ==
John Beckett (left) and Cathal Gannon in China, 1980

John Beckett regularly performed music by Haydn, notably his piano trios and songs, which were sung by Frank Patterson and which were recorded by RTÉ radio. John founded the Henry Purcell Consort in 1975 and played a great deal of Henry Purcell's music to Dublin audiences. He also recorded an LP of Purcell songs with Frank, and recorded some for a BBC radio programme. He also played with the Dublin Consort of Viols (an offshoot of the Consort of Saint Sepulchre), which specialised in the performance of works by Purcell, Byrd, Lawes, Jenkins (whose music John adored) and other composers of that genre.

He worked regularly with the New Irish Chamber Orchestra and went with them to Italy in 1975, where he was unexpectedly presented with a papal medal from Pope Paul VI after an impromptu performance with Our Lady's Choral Society in St. Peter's Square.

John Beckett went with NICO to China in 1980, a trip that he greatly enjoyed. He performed on a Kirckmann harpsichord of 1772 and an early nineteenth-century Broadwood grand piano, both owned by Trinity College Dublin, and conducted the RTÉ Symphony Orchestra in works by Mahler, Elgar and Sibelius. By this time, he and Ruth had moved to Bray, County Wicklow.

== Likes and dislikes ==
At around this time in his life, John Beckett recollected a journey to the Great Blasket Island, off the west coast of Ireland, which was made in a currach over a rough sea during the 1940s, when the island was still inhabited. He enjoyed the experience of living and drinking with the locals in their rough cottages and listened to the traditional music and songs that they performed. He relished the earthiness of plain, simple Mediterranean ceramics and loved Byzantine icons (especially those darkened with age).

He was heavily influenced by the writings of his cousin Samuel Beckett, James Joyce (whom Samuel had worshipped) and Kafka. He also developed a liking for the sparse, angular shapes of Chinese and Japanese calligraphy, which was mirrored in his distinctive handwriting. The roughness and irregularity of a Japanese tea bowl fascinated him. His two greatest treasures were a bamboo chair, purchased in China, and an old hanging wall clock that had belonged to his mother, which had been fixed for him by Cathal Gannon and about which he often spoke. He also savoured well-flavoured, peasant food and had a strong penchant for garlic which he often carried in his pocket, using the cloves to flavour his much-loved whiskey.

John venerated James Joyce to the same extent that he worshipped Johann Sebastian Bach and read Joyce's Ulysses regularly. He visited Joyce's grave in Switzerland and attended an exhibition of paintings by Paul Klee. He traveled extensively around Germany, visiting all the places associated with Bach.

Although John's taste in music was wide and eclectic, there were composers whose music he detested; it was well known that he hated the music of Handel, Vivaldi and Corelli. He loathed what he considered the inappropriate use of Mahler's 5th Symphony in Visconti's 1971 film Death in Venice.

== Move to London ==
In 1983, Ruth David sold her house in Bray and she and John left Ireland, moving to Greenwich in London, where he worked until he retired, for BBC Radio 3, producing and presenting various music programmes, and reporting on 'foreign' tapes.

In 1990, he was invited to conduct the inaugural concert of the Irish Baroque Orchestra at the Third Early Music Festival in Dublin, but ill health intervened. Earlier he had had a hip operation. John's partner Ruth died in 1995 and then, in December 2002, his sister Ann died as well. He lived alone but was visited regularly by his friends in London and Dublin.

John Beckett had visited Ann in Dublin on a regular basis and more frequently when she became ill; after she had died, he could not be persuaded to return to Ireland and declined to attend a reunion of the Cusack and Morrow families in Roundwood, County Wicklow. He died, sitting in his chair, on the morning of his 80th birthday, 5 February 2007 and was cremated at Lewisham Crematorium 11 days later following a simple ceremony consisting of Japanese music for the shakuhachi (an end-blown flute), which he had requested to be played at his funeral.

== Further reading and additional information ==
- Gannon, Charles: Cathal Gannon — The Life and Times of a Dublin Craftsman, Dublin: 2006, Lilliput Press.
- Gannon, Charles: John S. Beckett — The Man and the Music, Dublin: 2016, Lilliput Press. ISBN 9781843516651.
- Gannon, Charles: Short Biography of John Beckett, Bach Cantatas Website.
- Knowlson, James: Damned to Fame: The Life of Samuel Beckett (Bloomsbury Publishing PLC, 1997)
- Cronin, Anthony: Samuel Beckett: The Last Modernist (HarperCollinsPublishers, 1996)
- Fitz-Simon, Christopher: Eleven Houses – A Memoir of Childhood, Penguin Ireland, 2007, p. 56.
- Dervan, Michael: Obituary, The Irish Times, 17 February 2007, p. 14.
- Calder, John: Obituary, The Guardian, 5 March 2007.
- Jack, Adrian: Obituary, The Independent, 12 March 2007.
- Bartlett, Clifford: Obituary, Early Music Review, April 2007.
- Hoppen, Professor K. T.: Letter to The Guardian, 16 March 2007.
- Armstrong, Lindsay: A Tribute to John Beckett, 11 February 2007, St Ann's Church, Dublin.
- Celebrating John Beckett, Programme notes edited by Andrew Robinson, for special concert held on 24 November 2007.
- Robinson, Andrew ('Recumbentman') on h2g2.
- Thomson, Sothcott, Fallows, Page: Obituaries: Michael Morrow, 1929-94, Early Music, Vol. 22, No. 3 (August 1994).
- John Beckett website.
- Additional sources listed on John Beckett website.
- Portrait of John Beckett by Reginald Gray (Collection St. Columba's College, Dublin, Ireland).
- John Beckett and Michael Morrow files held at the BBC Written Archives in Reading, England.
- Michael Morrow files held at the Archives of King's College London.
- Recordings featuring John Beckett at the British Library Sound Archive, St Pancras, London.
- John Beckett's musical reviews in The Bell journal (editor, Peadar O'Donnell), volumes 17 and 18 (1951 and 1952), in Trinity College Library, Dublin.
- Radio Times, back numbers in the British Library Newspapers Department, Colindale, London.
- Archives of The Times (subscription required) and The Irish Times.
