= Early Music Consort =

British musical ensemble

The Early Music Consort of London
- An early line-up of the Early Music Consort (left to right: Christopher Hogwood, David Munrow, James Tyler, Oliver Brookes, James Bowman)

Background information
- Also known as: The Early Music Consort
- Origin: UK
- Genres: Classical, Early music
- Years active: 1967–1976
- Labels: Argo; Virgin Veritas
- Past members: David Munrow, Christopher Hogwood, James Tyler, Oliver Brookes, James Bowman

The Early Music Consort of London was a British music ensemble in the late 1960s and 1970s which specialised in historically informed performance of Medieval and Renaissance music. It was founded in 1967 by music academics Christopher Hogwood and David Munrow and produced many highly influential recordings. The group disbanded in 1976 following Munrow's suicide.

== History ==
The formation of the Early Music Consort of London in the late 1960s has been credited with popularising the genre of Early music in UK and being main instigator of the British Early music revival of the late 20th century. Munrow was inspired by the Alte Musik movement that had already gained popularity in Germany, and sought to foster an interest in music of the Medieval and Renaissance eras among British audiences. Munrow collaborated with Christopher Hogwood, with whom he had studied at Pembroke College, Cambridge University in setting up a new specialist music group, initially called the Early Music Consort, but changed to The Early Music Consort of London, prior to their tour of America. It was essentially a small, versatile group optimised for touring purposes, but capable of being augmented by larger forces for recording purposes. The group's original line-up consisted of Munrow, a wind instrumentalist who played many different instruments; Hogwood playing keyboard, harp and percussion; Mary Remnant on fiddle, organ and tabor; Oliver Brookes on viol; Robert Spencer on lute; and the countertenor James Bowman. Later, another multi instrumentalist James Tyler replaced Robert Spencer and Mary Remnant left. A number of other singers also worked with the group such as the tenor Martyn Hill.

== Selected discography ==
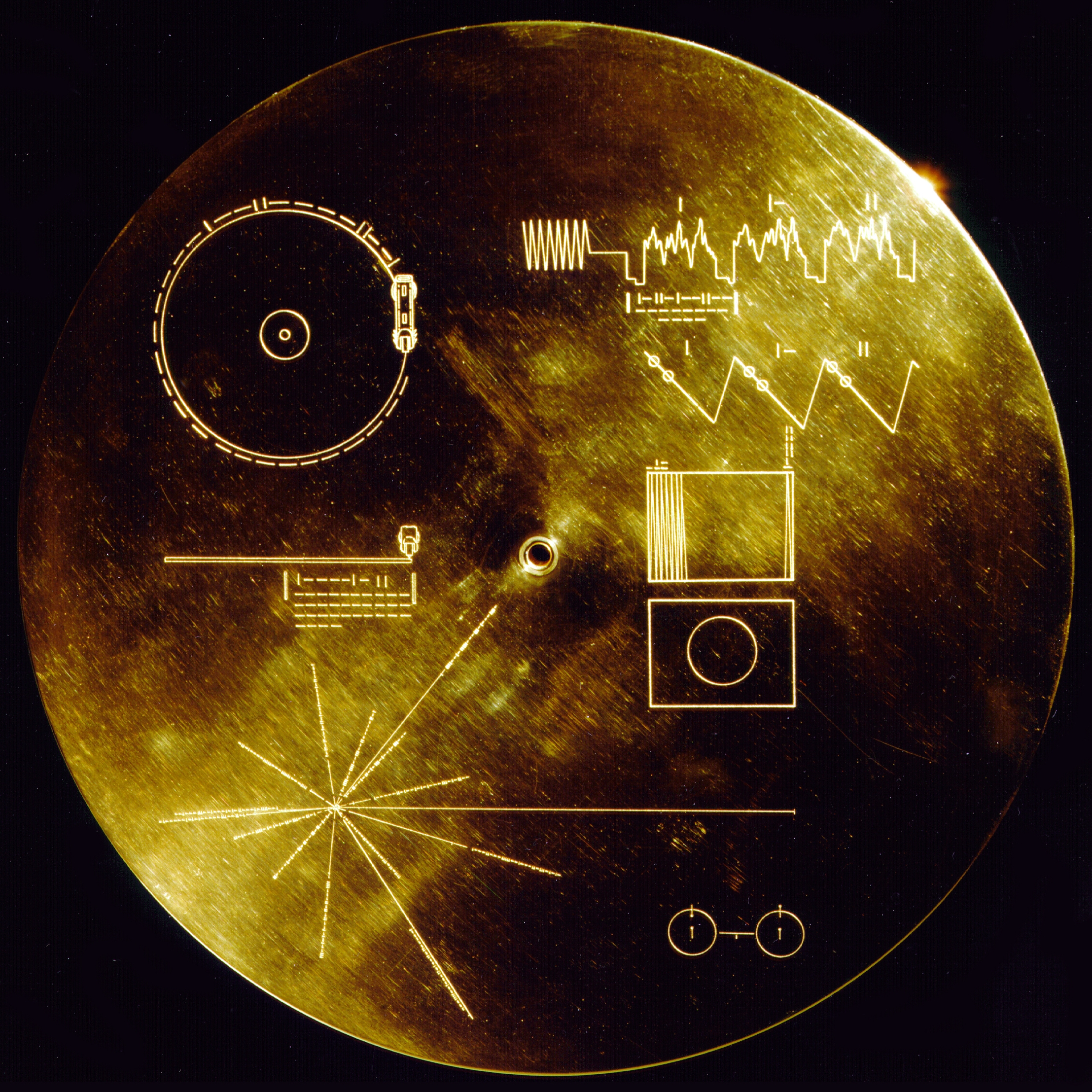
The Voyager Golden Record

The Early Music Consort of London produced many influential collections of early music, typical of which was The Art of the Netherlands issued as a three-record set in 1976.

A track from their 1976 recording, Instruments of the Middle Ages and Renaissance — "The Fairie Round" from Pavans, Galliards, Almains and other short Aeirs — was selected by NASA for inclusion on the Voyager Golden Record, a pair of phonograph records that were sent into space aboard the Voyager 1 and Voyager 2 space probes in 1977. The piece, written for recorder consort by the English Tudor composer Anthony Holborne, was chosen by a committee chaired by Carl Sagan as a significant example of Western music and a representation of human culture. The sheet music used contained an error in the bass part which created a most uncharacteristic unresolved cadence. Munrow played the bass sordune on the recording.

- Ecco la primavera - Florentine Music of the 14th Cent (1969)
- Music of the Crusades (1971)
- The Triumphs of Maximilian I (1970)
- The Six Wives of Henry VIII (1970)
- Music for Ferdinand and Isabella of Spain (1972)
- The Art of Courtly Love (1973)
- Praetorius - Dances and Motets (1973)
- Music of Guillaume Dufay: Missa "Se La Face Ay Pale" (1974)
- Instruments of the Middle Ages and Renaissance (1976)
- Monteverdi's Contemporaries (1976)
- Music of the Gothic Era (1976)
- Greensleeves to a Ground (1976)
- Festival of Early Music - Music from 14th Century Florence, Music of the Crusades & The Triumphs of Maximilian (1976)
- Henry Purcell: Birthday Odes for Queen Mary (1976)
- The Art of the Netherlands (1976)
- A Contemporary Elizabethan Concert (1977)
- The Art of David Munrow (2026)
