= David Munrow =

British musician (1942-1976)

- Munrow playing a six-holed pipe in 1976

Background information
- Born: 12 August 1942
- Origin: Birmingham, England, United Kingdom
- Died: 15 May 1976 (aged 33) Chesham Bois, England
- Genre: Early music
- Occupations: Musician, broadcaster
- Instruments: Recorder, shawm, crumhorn, dulcian
- Years active: 10
- Labels: EMI, Argos, Archiv/DG

David John Munrow (12 August 1942 – 15 May 1976) was a British musician and early music historian.

== Early life and education ==
Munrow was born in Birmingham where both his parents taught at the University of Birmingham. His mother, Hilda Ivy (née Norman) Munrow (1905–1985), was a dance teacher and his father, Albert Davis "Dave" Munrow (1908–1975), was a lecturer and physical education instructor who wrote a book on the subject.

Munrow attended King Edward's School, Birmingham until 1960. He excelled academically and was noted for his treble voice. He was lent a bassoon and returned it in about a fortnight, able to play it remarkably well.

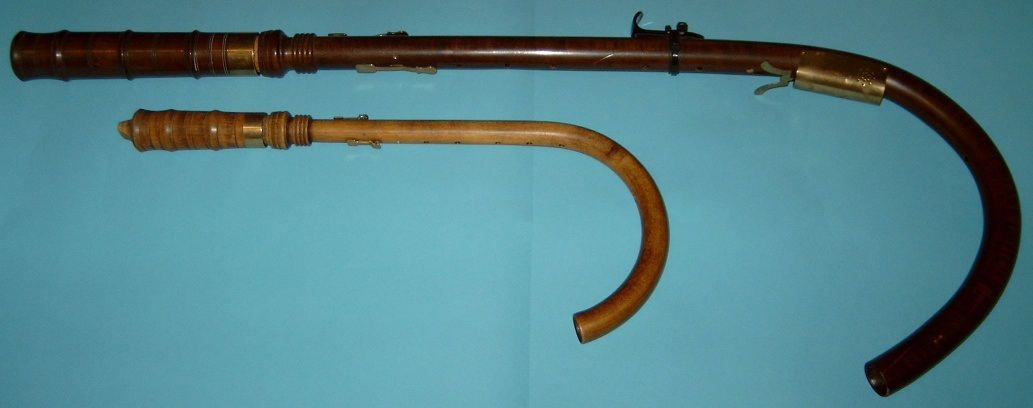
Two crumhorns

In 1960, Munrow took a gap year and went to Peru to teach English at Markham College in Lima under the British Council student teacher scheme. He reached Lima by train from São Paulo and later spent some time touring Brazil, Bolivia, Peru and Chile, immersing himself in the traditional music of Latin America and collecting folk instruments. He returned to Britain with a number of Bolivian flutes and other obscure instruments.

While reading English for a master's degree at Pembroke College, Cambridge, he became involved in musical performance, playing South American instruments in a students' autumn-term concert organised by Christopher Hogwood. A professor of music, Thurston Dart, was intrigued by Munrow's performance and encouraged him to explore links between Latin American folk instruments and early European instruments. While visiting Dart's study, Munrow noticed a crumhorn hanging on the wall; Dart suggested he borrow it and this inspired Munrow to commence an independent study of early musical instruments.

== Career ==
Starting from his ability as a pianist, singer and bassoonist, Munrow began to acquire copies of medieval and renaissance instruments, together with folk instruments such as the Chinese shawm 'suona' and Spanish bagpipes 'gaita'. Whilst still an undergraduate he began to give lecture recitals, initially assisted by Mary Remnant. Later, he formed a trio with Christopher Hogwood and his future wife, Gillian Reid, and toured music clubs and music societies giving recitals featuring predominantly medieval and renaissance music, some of which was featured in the Oryx LP 'The Mediaeval Sound'. He joined the Royal Shakespeare Company Windband as a bassoonist but soon played instruments of Shakespeare's time under the encouragement of music director Guy Wolfenden. Although he displayed talent on a wide variety of instruments, he had a particularly lasting influence as a recorder player. His English style of discreet and controlled expression contrasts with the greater tonal flexibility of the Continental style espoused by the Dutch recorder player Frans Brüggen and others.

By 1967 he was appointed a part-time lecturer in early music history at the University of Leicester, having married Gillian Veronica Reid the previous year. He also taught early woodwind instruments at King's College London, where his mentor, Thurston Dart, had recently been appointed head of the new music department. With Christopher Hogwood he formed the Early Music Consort of London, whose core members were experts on their particular instruments. Sometimes other professional musicians were employed when necessary, such as Nigel North and Robert Spencer, both highly regarded lutenists. From 1968, he toured the world, unearthing obscure instruments in every country he visited. He commissioned reconstructions of instruments related to the cornett and rackett from, amongst others, Christopher Monk and Otto Steinkopf. Two television programmes made him a household name: The Six Wives of Henry VIII (1970) and Elizabeth R (1971). He also scored the feature film adaptation of the former, Henry VIII and His Six Wives, in 1972.

The early music revival was born following Munrow's success with his soundtrack for The Six Wives of Henry VIII, which contained authentic music played on original instruments, and generated worldwide enthusiasm for music and instruments from the renaissance period. Subsequently, demand for such historical instruments increased dramatically, resulting in Munrow's encouragement for the formation of a business specialising in this area, which is still trading as The Early Music Shop, established in 1968 and now based in Saltaire, West Yorkshire. Munrow was a loyal and enthusiastic customer of the Early Music Shop, having helped the founder, Richard Wood, create the business's name, and travelling immediately to the music store to be re-equipped with a variety of historical instruments after losing his entire collection in a theft.

Munrow's two contributions to film music were for British directors:

- Ken Russell's The Devils (1971). The film is set in the 17th century, and Munrow's contribution included numbers from Terpsichore, Michael Praetorius's collection of French dance music. It complemented an original score by Peter Maxwell Davies performed by the Fires of London.
- Zardoz (1974), written and directed by John Boorman. This included arrangements of Beethoven's Symphony No. 7 for early music instruments.

During his relatively short life, Munrow released over 50 records, some of which are now available on CD. In addition to his recordings with The Early Music Consort of London, he recorded with Michael Morrow's Musica Reservata, Alfred Deller and the King's Singers. He recorded Bach and Monteverdi many times, but his widest influence was in the Medieval and Renaissance periods. His three-record set with The Early Music Consort of London, The Art of the Netherlands, issued in 1976 (EMI SLS5049), was particularly influential in popularising the genre.

On BBC Radio 3 he presented 655 editions of Pied Piper, a multi-ethnic and centuries-spanning spread of music from Monteverdi to the Electric Light Orchestra rock group. Munrow also had dealings notably with Pentangle, the Young Tradition and Shirley and Dolly Collins.

Apart from his regular radio slot and other programmes, he appeared on television, most notably on BBC 2 in a series entitled Ancestral Voices in a London studio, and on ITV's Early Musical Instruments, filmed on location at Ordsall Hall in Salford. He also wrote one book entitled Instruments of the Middle Ages and the Renaissance. This originally accompanied a record set of the same name.

== Personal life ==
Munrow's personal interests were travel, sailing, jazz and antiques, as revealed in his appearance on Desert Island Discs. He was also a linguist. In addition, he wrote some articles on music, especially for his own recordings, most often for the OUP journal Early Music.

== Death ==
In 1976, Munrow hanged himself while in a state of depression; the recent deaths of his father and father-in-law, to whom he dedicated his sole book, are thought to have contributed to his decision to take his own life. He had, however, attempted suicide by drug overdose the previous year.

His death was widely seen as a tragic loss to the early music movement.

== Legacy ==
Munrow perhaps did more than anyone else in the second half of the 20th century to popularise early music in Britain, despite a career lasting barely 10 years. This was underscored when NASA's Voyager space probe committee selected one of his Early Music Consort recordings for the Voyager Golden Record, a gold-plated copper record that was to be sent into space. "The Fairie Round" from Paueans, Galliards, Almains and Other Short Aeirs by Anthony Holborne was included among a compilation of sounds and images which had been chosen as examples of the diversity of life and culture on Earth. The record was launched into space aboard the Voyager probes in 1977, the year after Munrow's death.

Munrow left behind him not only his recordings but a large collection of musical instruments. The Munrow Archive at the Royal Academy of Music holds a collection of his letters, papers, TV scripts, scores, musical compositions and books. The collection is accessible to the public. The online catalogue of the British Library Sound Archive reveals his many recording entries, and those of many other notable people.

Information about the life and work of David Munrow can be found in obituaries about him in 1976 (particularly the OUP journal Early Music), and in the following sources: a detailed piece in the Oxford Dictionary of National Biography by Christopher Hogwood; The New Grove Dictionary of Music and Musicians; The Art of David Munrow, a record set with a biography by Arthur Johnson, the producer of Pied Piper; and on the old vinyl sleeve of the Renaissance Suite.

== Selected discography ==
- Recordings with Musica Reservata
  - French Court Music of the Thirteenth Century (1967)
  - Music from the 100 Years War (1968)
  - Music from the Decameron (1969)
  - 16th Century Italian Dance Music (1970)
  - Music from the Court of Burgundy (1971)
- Recordings with The Early Music Consort, directed by David Munrow
  - Ecco la primavera – Florentine Music of the 14th Cent (1969)
  - Music of the Crusades (1971)
  - The Triumphs of Maximilian I (1970)
  - Music for Ferdinand and Isabella of Spain (1972)
  - The Art of Courtly Love (1973)
  - Praetorius – Dances and Motets (1973)
  - Music of Guillaume Dufay: Missa "Se La Face Ay Pale" (1974)
  - Instruments of the Middle Ages and Renaissance (1976)
  - Monteverdi's Contemporaries (1976)
  - Music of the Gothic Era (1976)
  - Greensleeves to a Ground (1976)
  - Festival of Early Music – Music from 14th Century Florence, Music of the Crusades & The Triumphs of Maximilian (1976)
  - Henry Purcell: Birthday Odes for Queen Mary (1976)
  - The Art of the Netherlands (1976)
  - Two Renaissance Dance Bands / Monteverdi's Contemporaries (1996; recordings from 1971 and 1975)
- The Young Tradition and Early Music Consort
  - Galleries (1968)
- The Round Table & David Munrow
  - Spinning Wheel (1969)
  - "Saturday Gigue/Scarborough Fair" (single) (1969)
- Shirley and Dolly Collins & the Early Music Consort of London
  - Anthems in Eden (1969)
  - Love, Death and the Lady (1970)
  - Amaranth (1976; reissue of the Anthems in Eden suite with one side of new recordings, credited to Shirley Collins only)
- Ashley Hutchings
  - Rattlebone and Ploughjack (1976)
- Royal Shakespeare Wind Band, directed by Guy Wolfenden
  - Music From Shakespeare's Time (1969)
- David Munrow, Gillian Reid, Christopher Hogwood
  - The Mediaeval Sound (1970)
  - Pleasures of the Court – Festival dance music by Susato & Morley (1971)
- David Munrow, Oliver Brookes, Robert Spencer, Christopher Hogwood
  - The Amorous Flute (1973)
- David Munrow solo or in various combinations
  - Telemann: Suite for Recorder and Orchestra, Concerti for Recorder and Orchestra by Sammartini and Handel
  - The Art of the Recorder (1975)
  - The Art of David Munrow (1971–1976)

== Music for radio, television and cinema ==
=== Radio ===
- Tolkien's The Hobbit (BBC Radio 4 adaptation) (1968)

=== Television ===
- The Six Wives of Henry VIII (BBC TV) (1970)
- Elizabeth R (BBC TV) (1971)
- Early Musical Instruments (Granada TV) (1976)
- Ancestral Voices (BBC TV) (1976)

=== Film ===
- The Devils (directed by Ken Russell) (1971)
- Henry VIII and His Six Wives (directed by Waris Hussein) (1972)
- Zardoz (directed by John Boorman) (1974)
- La Course en tête (directed by Joël Santoni) (1974). A documentary on Belgian cyclist Eddy Merckx. Soundtrack released as Renaissance Suite (1974)

== Awards and recognitions ==
Grammy Award for Best Chamber Music Performance:

- David Munrow (conductor) & the Early Music Consort of London for The Art of Courtly Love (1977)

== See also ==
- Jordi Savall
- Philip Pickett

Similar early music performers with an interest in renaissance and medieval music.
