= Charles Daniels (tenor) =

English singer

Charles Daniels is an English tenor, particularly noted for his performances of baroque music. He is a frequent soloist with The King's Consort, and has made over 25 recordings with the ensemble on the Hyperion label.

== Biography ==
Born 1960 in Salisbury, Daniels attended the choir school at King's College, Cambridge where he was a chorister, then Winchester College for his secondary education. He returned to King's College for his university education, where he was a choral scholar, reading Natural Sciences and Music. After taking his degree, he studied under Edward Brooks at the Royal College of Music in London where he was awarded a Foundation Scholarship.

His concert and recording repertoire extends from the Middle Ages to 20th-century composers such as Luigi Nono and Benjamin Britten. In December 2001, he was the tenor soloist in a performance of Wojciech Kilar's Missa pro pace, performed in the Vatican in the presence of Pope John Paul II. However, he is best known for his interpretations of baroque music, and in particular for the role of Evangelist in the St Matthew Passion and the St John Passion by J. S. Bach. In 2016 he was being considered as "probably the world's best Evangelist". Daniels has made frequent concert appearances at Wigmore Hall and the BBC Proms in addition to performing frequently in both European and North American music festivals.

His opera performances have included Purcell's The Fairy-Queen at the Aix-en-Provence Festival, the New York City premiere of Lully's Atys and the title role in Monteverdi's L'Orfeo for its Montreal premiere at the Montreal Baroque Festival; the festival subsequently released a recital disc with Daniels singing excerpts from L'Orfeo and songs by John Dowland and other composers of the period. He also won praise for his singing in the role of 'An Attendant on Pleasure' for the Hyperion recording of Handel's operatic oratorio The Choice of Hercules.

He was for sixteen years a member of the early music vocal ensemble the Orlando Consort.

In addition to conducting master classes at the Montreal Baroque Festival, Daniels teaches early music performance practice at the Ringve Museum's International Summer Course in Norway.

== Recordings ==
Daniels has made over 80 recordings as a soloist, including:

- Lute Songs (Charles Daniels – tenor, Nigel North – lute), ATMA ACD2 2548
- Handel: Messiah (Susan Gritton, Dorothea Röschmann, Bernarda Fink, Charles Daniels, Neal Davies, Gabrieli Consort & Players, conductor Paul McCreesh) Archiv 028947706625
- John Gay: The Beggar's Opera (Bob Hoskins, Ian Caddy, Adrian Thompson, Charles Daniels, Sarah Walker, Richard Jackson, Anne Dawson, Roger Bryson, Ian Honeyman, Catherine Wyn-Rogers, The Broadside Band, conductor Jeremy Barlow) Hyperion CDA66591/2
- Handel: The Choice of Hercules (Susan Gritton, Robin Blaze, Alice Coote, Charles Daniels, The King's Consort, conductor Robert King) Hyperion CDA67298
- Orfeo Fantasia – excerpts from Monteverdi's L'Orfeo and songs by Dowland, Monteverdi, Hume, Caccini, and Guédron (Charles Daniels, Montreal Baroque ensemble) ATMA SACD22337
- Sweet Stay Awhile – John Dowland songs & lute pieces (Charles Daniels – tenor, David Miller – lute) EMI Classics CDZ 7243 5 72266 2 2
- Bach: Magnificat & Easter Oratorio (Emily Van Evera, Caroline Trevor, Charles Daniels, Peter Kooy, Taverner Consort, conductor Andrew Parrott) EMI Classics.
- Purcell: The Complete Odes and Welcome Songs Volumes 1–8 (Mark Kennedy, Eamonn O'Dwyer, James Goodman, Susan Gritton, James Bowman, Nigel Short, Rogers Covey-Crump, Charles Daniels, Michael George, Choir of New College Oxford, King's Consort, conductor Robert King) Hyperion 44031/8
- The Earliest Songbook in England – Medieval secular and religious songs (Catherine King, Stephen Charlesworth, Charles Daniels, Leigh Nixon, Gothic Voices, Conductor: Christopher Page) Hyperion 67177
- J. S. Bach: Matthäus-Passion, BWV 244. Charles Daniels (Evangelist), Peter Harvey (Jesus), Joanne Lunn (Soprano), Margot Oitzinger (Alto), Charles Daniels (Tenore), Wolf Matthias Friedrich (Basso). Choir and Orchestra of J. S. Bach-Stiftung. Rudolf Lutz (Conductor). J. S. Bach-Stiftung, St. Gallen / Radio SRF 2 Kultur, 2014.
- Marc-Antoine Charpentier : Vêpres aux Jésuites, H.536, H.204, H.361, H.203–203a, H.225, H.32, H.208, H.35, H.160–160a, H.67, H.78. (work reconstructed by Catherine Cessac, Ensemble Vocal de Lausanne, Charles Daniels, Mark Tucker, Hans-Jürg Rickenbacher, Peter Harvey, Stephan Imboden, Natacha Ducret, Ensemble baroque L'Arpa Festante conducted by Michel Corboz. 2 CD Cascavelle VEL 1030 (1993)
