= Gothic Voices =

British vocal ensemble

- Vocal ensemble
- Founded: 1980
- Genre: Medieval music
- Notable members: Catherine King; Julian Podger; Emma Kirkby; Emily Van Evera; Evelyn Tubb; Howard Milner; Charles Daniels; Rogers Covey-Crump; James Gilchrist, Paul Agnew; John Mark Ainsley; Peter Harvey
- Director: Christopher Page
- Label: Hyperion
- Website: www.gothicvoices.co.uk

Gothic Voices is a United Kingdom-based vocal ensemble specialising in the performance of music of the Medieval era. The group was originally formed in 1980 by the scholar and musician Christopher Page.

== Repertoire ==
The choir's repertoire is mostly music from the 11th to the 15th century, encompassing works by composers such as Guillaume de Machaut, Guillaume Du Fay and Hildegard of Bingen, and other music from the European Medieval and early Renaissance eras. As well as performing medieval repertoire, the group sings contemporary music, particularly pieces with medieval associations, and commissions new works from composers such as Joanne Metcalf and Andrew Smith.

The distinctive sound of the Gothic Voices is attributable to Christopher Page's musicological research into Medieval performance practice, from which he concluded that the lines of musical accompaniment in Medieval scores were intended to be sung by lower voice parts, rather than played by instruments. Page presented his findings in 1981 in broadcasts on BBC Radio 3 prior to the release of the Gothic Voices' first recording later that year. Their performance style has been influential on a number of noted early music vocal groups such as Sequentia.

== Members ==
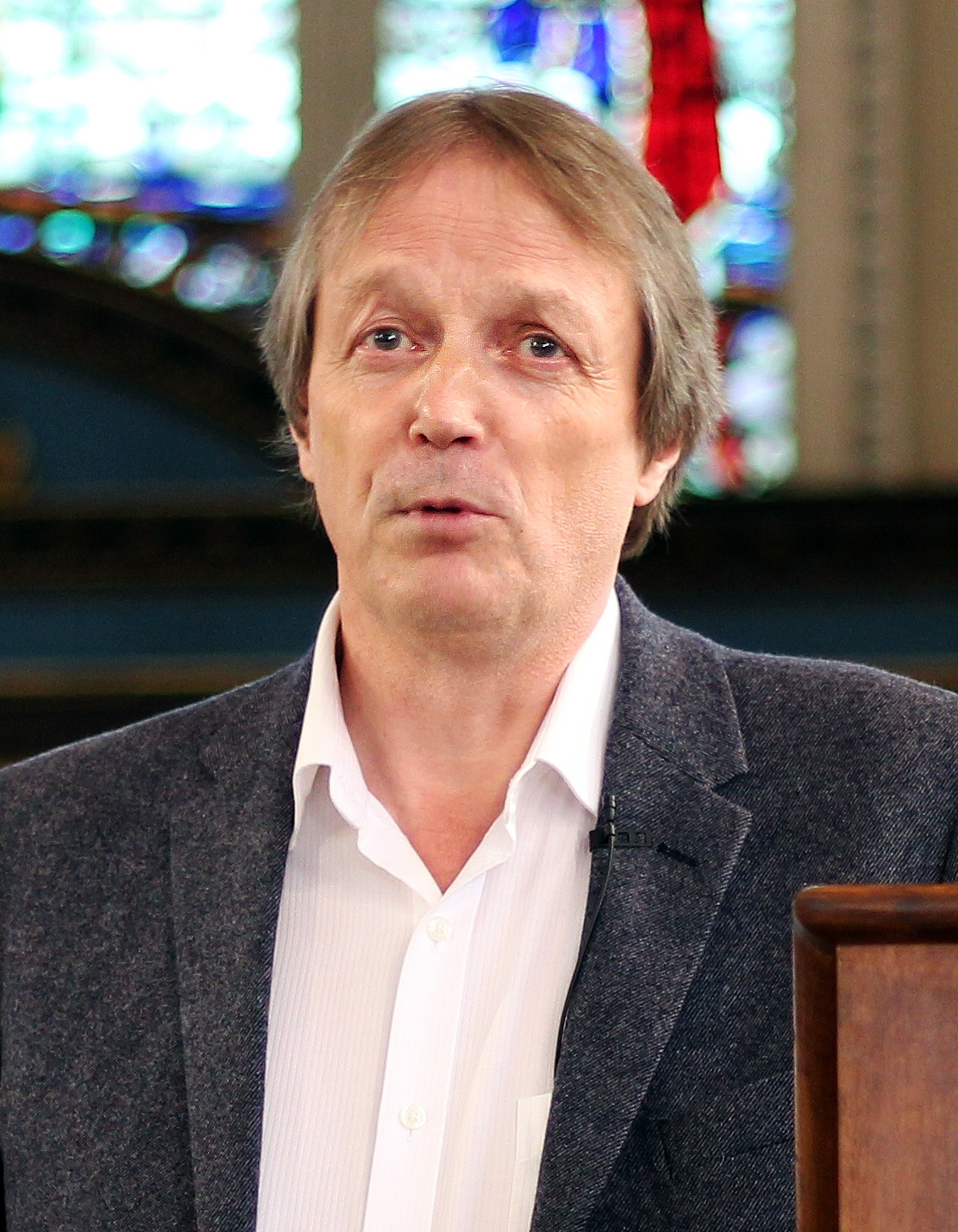
The founding director of Gothic Voices is the musicologist Christopher Page

Following the retirement of Leigh Nixon in September 2014, the current singers in Gothic Voices are Catherine King (mezzo-soprano), Steven Harrold (tenor), Julian Podger (tenor) and Stephen Charlesworth (baritone), a line-up which has been consistent since 1995. Other notable singers who have performed and recorded with Gothic Voices include Emma Kirkby, Emily Van Evera, Margaret Philpot, Evelyn Tubb, Howard Milner, Charles Daniels, Rogers Covey-Crump, James Gilchrist, Paul Agnew, John Mark Ainsley and Peter Harvey.

== Recordings ==
Gothic Voices have recorded 23 albums for the Hyperion, Avie and Linn record labels, three of which have won the Gramophone Award given by Gramophone magazine. The group's first disc, A Feather on the Breath of God – Hymns and Sequences by Abbess Hildegard of Bingen was one of Hyperion's biggest commercial successes and remains one of the best-selling recordings of pre-classical music ever made. The album was selected in 2020 by the Library of Congress for preservation in the National Recording Registry for being "culturally, historically, or aesthetically significant".

Among Gothic Voices' more recent recordings are a disc of the complete works of the relatively obscure 14th-century composer Solage coupled with works by Machaut and a disc entitled A Laurel for Landini - 14th Century Italy’s Greatest Composer, with music by Francesco Landini. Their 2023 album, The Splendour of Florence, features music of early Renaissance Italy, including a motet written by Dufay for the consecration of Florence's new cathedral in 1436.

- 1981 - A Feather on the Breath of God - Sequences and Hymns by Abbess Hildegard of Bingen Originally released by Hyperion on Vinyl LP A66039 1982 and re-released April 1985 on Hyperion CDA66039
- 1983 - The Mirror of Narcissus - Songs by Guillaume de Machaut Released Sep 1987 on Hyperion CDA66087
- 1984 - The Garden of Zephirus - Courtly songs of the early fifteenth century Re-released June 2007 on Helios CDH55289 (orig. Hyperion CDA66144)
- 1985 - The Castle of Fair Welcome - Courtly songs of the later 15th century Re-released Feb 2007 on Helios CDH55274 (orig. Hyperion CDA66194)
- 1986 - The Service of Venus and Mars - Music for the Knights of the Garter, 1340-1440 Re-released Feb 2010 on Helios CDH55290 (orig. Hyperion CDA66238)
- 1987 - A Song for Francesca - Music in Italy, 1330-1430 Re-released Sep 2011 on Helios CDH55291 (orig. Hyperion CDA66286)
- 1988 - Music for the Lion-Hearted King. Music to mark the 800th anniversary of the Coronation of King Richard 1 of England in Westminster Abbey, 3 September 1189 Re-released Nov 2007 on Helios CDH55292 (orig. Hyperion CDA66336)
- 1990 - The Marriage of Heaven and Hell - Motets and songs from 13th century France Re-released Feb 2007 on Helios CDH55273 (orig. Hyperion CDA66423)
- 1991 - The Medieval Romantics - French Songs and Motets, 1340-1440 Re-released Feb 2008 on Helios CDH55293 (orig. Hyperion CDA66463)
- 1991 - Lancaster and Valois - French and English Music, c1350-1420 Re-released Jul 2008 on Helios CDH55294 (orig. Hyperion CDA66588)
- 1992 - The Study of Love - French Songs and Motets for the 14th Century Re-released Sep 2008 on Helios CDH55295 (orig. Hyperion CDA66619
- 1993 - The Voice in the Garden: Spanish Songs and Motets, 1480–1550 Re-released Jan 2009 on Helios CDH55298 (orig. Hyperion CDA66653)
- 1994 - The Spirits of England and France, Vol. 1 - Music for Court and Church from the later Middle Ages Re-released Feb 2007 on Helios CDH55281 (orig. Hyperion CDA66739)
- 1994 - The Spirits of England and France, Vol. 2 - Songs of the Trouvères Re-released Jul 2009 on Helios CDH55282 (orig. Hyperion CDA66773)
- 1995 - The Spirits of England and France, Vol. 3 - Binchois and his Contemporaries Re-released Sep 2009 on Helios CDH55283 (orig. Hyperion CDA66783)
- 1996 - The Spirits of England and France, Vol. 4 - Missa Caput and the story of the Salve Regina Re-released Aug 2010 on Helios CDH55284 (orig. Hyperion CDA66857)
- 1996 - The Spirits of England and France, Vol. 5 - Missa Veterem hominem and other fifteenth-century English music Re-released Jan 2011 on Helios CDH55285 (orig. Hyperion CDA66919)
- 1997 - Pierre de la Rue: Missa de Feria and Missa Sancta Dei genitrix Re-released Jun 2011 on Helios CDH55296 (orig. Hyperion CDA67010)
- 1998 - Jerusalem: Vision of Peace - Songs and Plainchants of the twelfth and thirteenth centuries Released Oct 1998 on Hyperion CDA67039 (archive service)
- 1999 - Masters of the Rolls - Music by English composers of the fourteenth century Re-released Jul 2012 on Helios CDH55364 (orig. Hyperion CDA67098)
- 1999 - The Earliest Songbook in England - Cambridge University Library MS Ff.l.17(1) Re-released Jan 2012 on Helios CDH55297 (orig. Hyperion CDA67177)
- 2006 - Gothic Voices Gramophone Award Winners Collection - A Feather on the Breath of God, The Service of Venus and Mars, A Song for Francesca Released Sep 2006 on Hyperion CDS44251/3
- 2006 - The Unknown Lover - Songs by Solage and Machaut Released on Avie AV2089
- 2008 - A Laurel for Landini - 14th Century Italy's Greatest Composer Released on Avie AV2151
- 2015 - Mary Star of the Sea – A celebration of the Virgin Mary through a kaleidoscope of time-transcending medieval and contemporary music Released on Linn Records CKD541
- 2018 - The Dufay Spectacle Released on Linn Records CKD568
- 2021 - Nowell Synge We Bothe Al and Som Released on Linn Records CKD591
- 2021 - Echoes of an Old Hall Released on Linn Records CKD644
- 2023 - The Splendour of Florence – with a Burgundian Resonance Linn Records CKD700

== See also ==
- Historically informed performance
- List of early music ensembles
