= Emily Van Evera =

American soprano

- Born: Minnesota
- Occupations: Classical soprano in: Early music; Renaissance music; Baroque music; opera
- Website: www.emilyvanevera.com

Emily Van Evera is an American soprano who specializes in early music and Baroque music in historically informed performance.

Born in Minnesota, she has collaborated in Europe and the US with ensembles such as the Hilliard Ensemble, the London Symphony Orchestra, the Orchestra of the 18th Century, and the Philharmonia Baroque Orchestra. She has recorded music by Johann Sebastian Bach with several conductors.

Van Evera recorded music by Hildegard von Bingen with the ensemble Gothic Voices, conducted by Christopher Page. Their pioneering 1981 album A Feather on the Breath of God, where she sang solo alongside Emma Kirkby, won several prizes including a Gramophone Award in the category Early-Medieval in 1982–83. She has performed frequently with the singers and players of the Taverner Consort, conducted by Andrew Parrott. They recorded Bach cantatas such as Christ lag in Todes Banden, BWV 4 and Bach motets. She performed the second soprano part in a 1984 recording of Bach's Mass in B minor, alongside Kirkby, and the first soprano part in a 1989 recording of Bach's Magnificat, together with his Easter Oratorio. She performed in 1990 in a recording of his St John Passion in the last version of 1748. They appeared at The Proms, on 3 August 1985, performing in the Royal Albert Hall Bach's St Matthew Passion, with Kurt Equiluz as the Evangelist and Benjamin Luxon as the vox Christi (voice of Christ). and on 22 July 1991 with Monteverdi's Vespro della Beata Vergine. In 1994 she appeared with the ensemble as Dido in Purcell's Dido and Aeneas, with Ben Parry (musician) as Aeneas. A reviewer of the recording noted her expressivity: "vocal acting conveys a feeling of physical presence".
