= Orlando Consort =

The Orlando Consort was a British vocal consort which is best known for performing Renaissance choral music one voice to a part. The Consort was founded in 1988 as part of the activities of the Early Music Network of Great Britain, a forerunner of the NCEM, York. The group disbanded in 2024.

The last concert was a performance of 'Voices Appeared' for the Boston Early Music Festival on June 7 2024. This was a live soundtrack of music composed or performed during the lifetime of Joan of Arc. The soundtrack was devised and designed by Donald Greig to accompany screenings of Carl Theodor Dreyer's La Passion de Jeanne d'Arc (1928).

The four founding members were:

- Robert Harre-Jones (countertenor)
- Charles Daniels (tenor)
- Angus Smith (tenor)
- Donald Greig (baritone)

The four members of the second iteration of the group were:

- Matthew Venner - counter tenor
- Mark Dobell - tenor
- Angus Smith - tenor
- Donald Greig - baritone

The principal members were members of the Tallis Scholars, Gabrieli Consort or Taverner Consort.

The Consort has also performed and recorded with the jazz quartet Perfect Houseplants.

== Discography ==
The group recorded for Metronome, DG Archiv, Harmonia Mundi USA and Hyperion.

They recorded works by Machaut for various labels. From 2013 they released an 11-volume collection of works by this composer on Hyperion. The last volume appeared in 2025 after the group disbanded.
