= St Jude's Church, Hampstead Garden Suburb =

Coordinates: 51°34′48.44″N 00°11′24.11″W

- Parish Church of St Jude-on-the-Hill
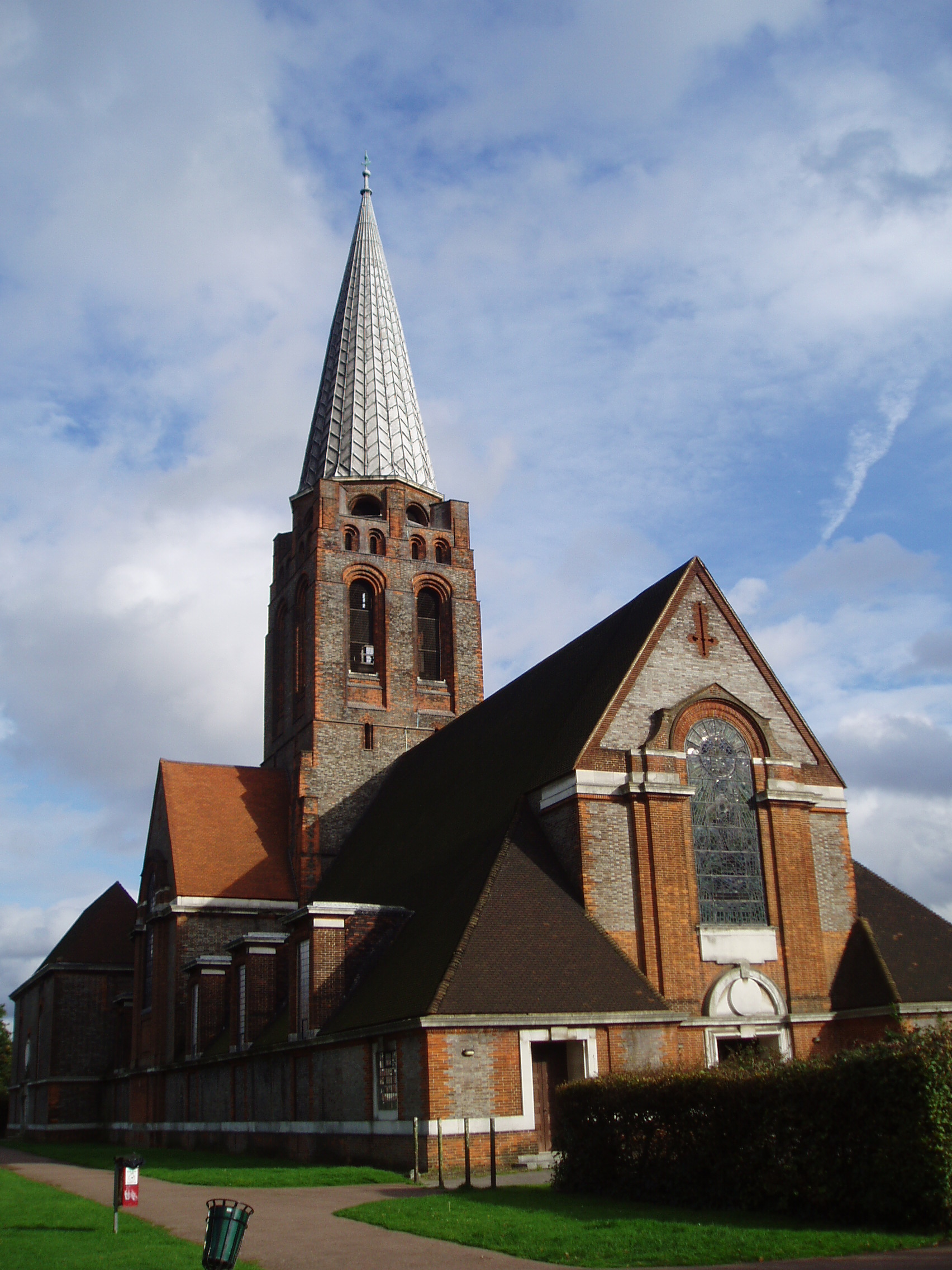
- Photo of St Jude's
- St Jude's Church, Hampstead Garden Suburb
- Location: London, NW117AH
- Denomination: Church of England
- Website: www.stjudeonthehill.com www.stjudeonthehill.org

History
- Dedicated: 1911

Architecture
- Architect: Edwin Lutyens
- Years built: 1904

Administration
- Diocese: London (Edmonton Area)
- Parish: Hampstead Garden Suburb

The Parish Church of St Jude-on-the-Hill (usually known simply as St Jude's), is the parish church of Hampstead Garden Suburb in north London. The suburb was founded in 1907 by Henrietta Barnett to be a model community where all classes of people could live together in attractive surroundings and social harmony.

== History ==
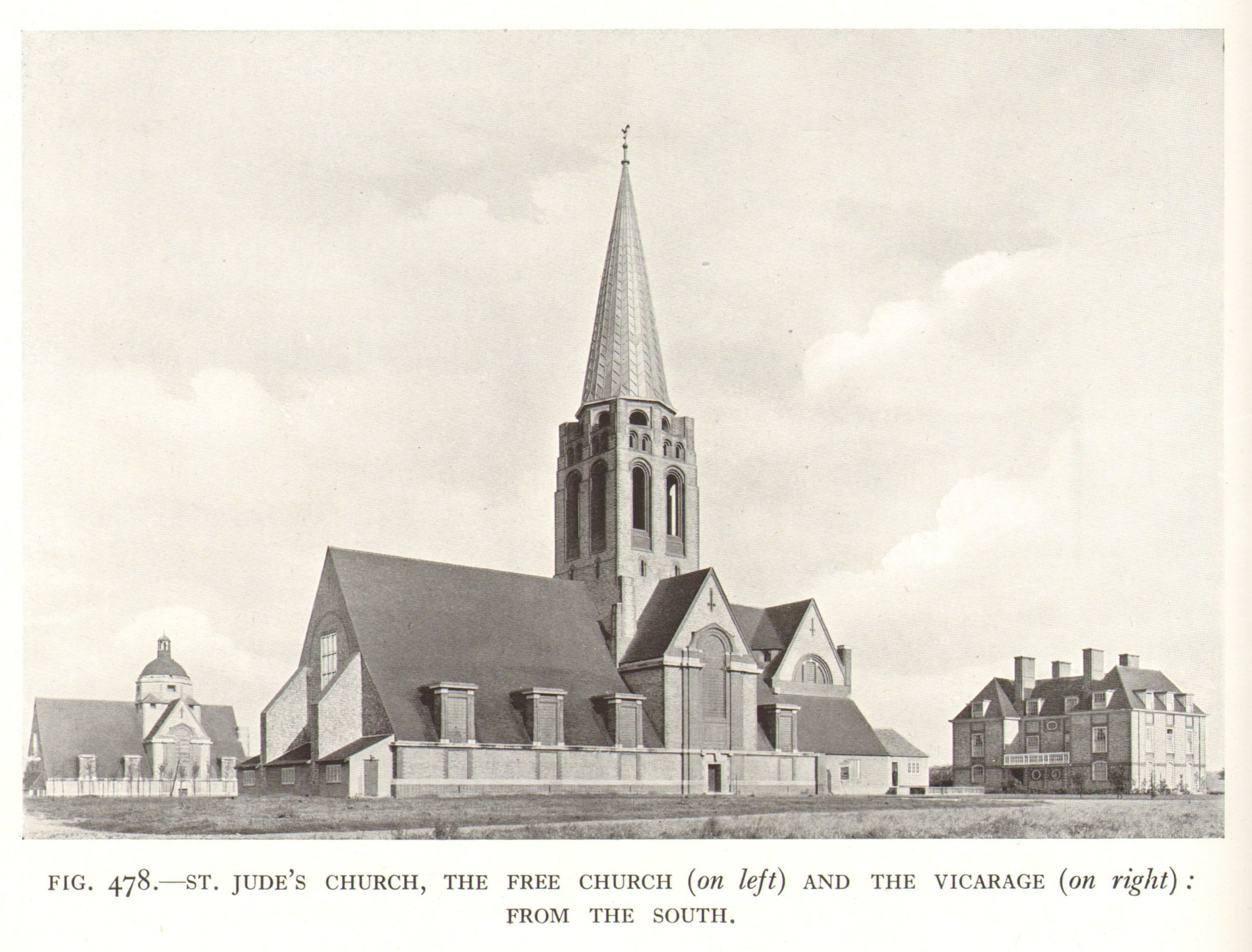
St Jude's Church, from Weaver (1913)

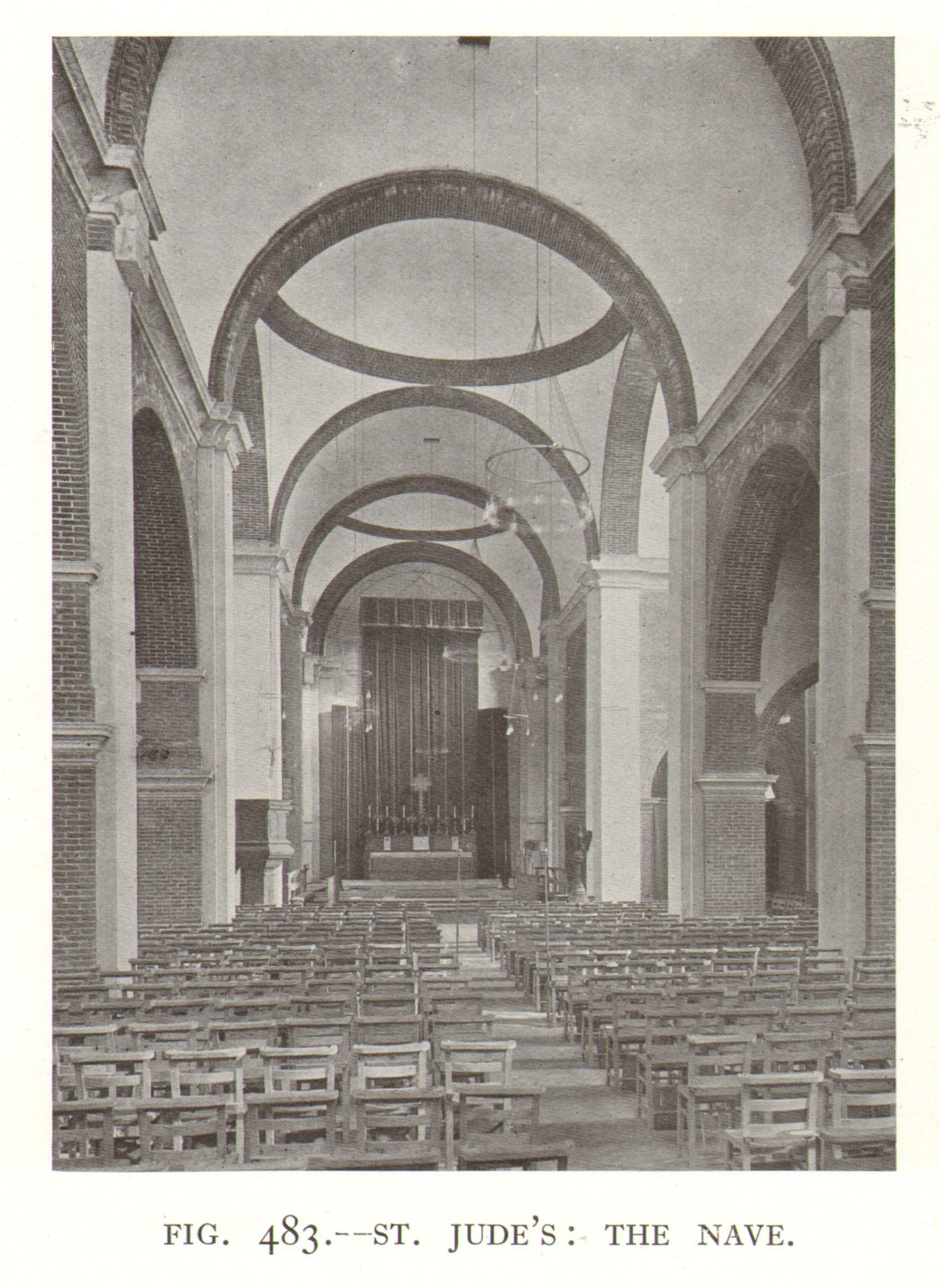
The Nave, from Weaver (1913)

The church was built to the designs of Edwin Lutyens (1869–1944).

It is a hybrid. Simon Jenkins calls it "the confident application of Queen Anne Revival to traditional church form". Building began in 1909, but the west end was not completed until 1935. The church was consecrated on 7 May 1911. Externally it is 200 feet long and the spire rises 178 feet above the ground.

Inside, the church is 122 feet from the west door to the chancel steps, and forty feet to the highest part of the roof. The ceiling is barrel-vaulted and domed. There are three vaults between the west end and the crossing; a saucer dome over the crossing; one further vault over the crossing and a saucer dome over the sanctuary. The east end finishes in an apse completed in 1923.

The murals and paintings are by Walter P. Starmer (1877–1961). He began with the Lady Chapel in 1920 and finished with the apse in 1929. Starmer served with the Red Cross and YMCA in the First World War, and many of his paintings of the Western Front are in the Imperial War Museum.

The west window (dedicated 1937) is to the design of Starmer and depicts Saint Jude holding the cross in his right hand and this church in his left. Below is his symbol, the ship; above, Christ in glory, surrounded by the traditional symbols of the four evangelists.

On the north side of the west door is a memorial (a brass plaque) to the horses killed in the First World War. The accompanying relief panel showing a warhorse is by 1970 by Rosemary Proctor (died 1995). It replaces a bronze model of a horse by Lutyens' father, and its replacement, which were stolen. Near it is a memorial to Basil Bourchier, the first vicar, and, on the south pillar, a commemoration of the completion of the west end. In the north-west porch are portraits of former vicars.

The ceiling panels over the centre aisle depict: the wise men and the shepherds; Christ feeding the multitude and stilling the storm; Christ healing the blind and lepers; the crucifixion (dome); and the entry into Jerusalem with Christ carrying the cross (chancel).

The memorials on the north wall are to John Raphael, a popular sportsman killed in the First World War; to Father Maxwell Rennie, a bust by his daughter Rosemary Proctor; and, in the lunette above St George's altar, a painting by Starmer represents the last few moments in the life of Michael Rennie, the Vicar's son, who died of exhaustion after rescuing several evacuee children after their ship, the SS City of Benares, had been torpedoed on its way to Canada in 1940.

The murals here and in the south aisle represent the teaching of Jesus in the parables of the kingdom. The Stations of the Cross, also by Starmer, begin here and continue into the south aisle.

The fine iron screens that flank the sanctuary are much older than the church and bear the name Matthias Heit and the date 1710. The sanctuary floor is patterned in brick and marble. The high altar includes two stones from Canada: a smaller dark one from the former French royal chapel of Annapolis Royal in Nova Scotia (where the first European settlement north of Florida was established in 1605, and where the first regular Church of England services were held in Canada in 1710), and a larger and lighter coloured one from the altar steps of Montreal Cathedral. The foundation stone on the north side of the chancel was laid on St Mark's Day 1910 and is by Eric Gill. The pulpit was also a gift from Canada.

Over the south door (into the car park) is a commemoration of the unveiling of the murals by the Prince of Wales in 1924, and, over the door, a figure of Christ by Rosemary Proctor in memory of her brother. Nearby, on the south wall, is a memorial to Edward VII.

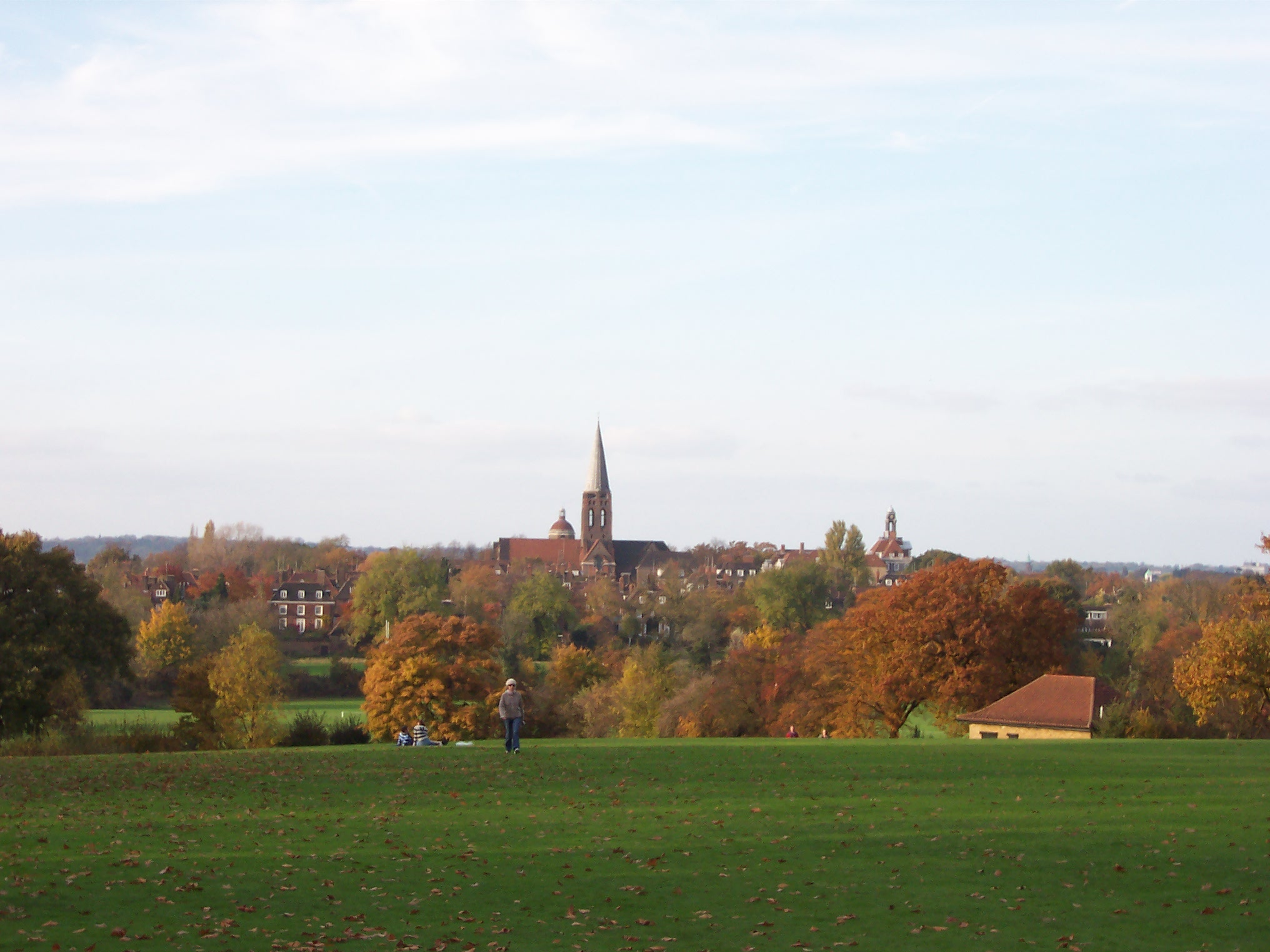
View from the south-east, from Hampstead Heath

To the left of the chancel is the Lady Chapel, the oldest part of the church, completed and opened for worship in 1910. On the pillar at the right of the entrance is a key to the ceiling painting depicting heroic women associated with the First World War, the campaign for women's suffrage, and other causes. Over the arch is a memorial to the unveiling of the frescoes. In the sanctuary is a wooden statue of Our Lady, a reproduction of the early sixteenth century Mourning Virgin or "Nuremberg Madonna" which would originally have been part of a crucifixion scene. Its curious proportions suggest that it was meant for a very high position and to be seen from far below. In the central panel of the altar is a modern reproduction of the Madonna and Child by Bernini. The Blessed Sacrament is reserved in the tabernacle behind the altar.

St John's Chapel, to the right of the sanctuary, was a gift of the Harmsworth family in 1923. The murals draw on the Gospel of John and the Book of Revelation. The memorial window to Robert Lovel St John Harmsworth (1898–1920), Son of Sir (Robert) Leicester Harmsworth, 1st Bt is by Robert Anning Bell, one of the most distinguished artists of his day. It has been described as one of the most charming of his designs, and makes use of features from seventeenth century English Baroque sepulchral monuments.

The green and white marble altar is by Lutyens. In the central panel is a picture by Maurice Greiffenhagen (a friend and colleague of Anning Bell at the Glasgow School of Art, and a fellow Royal Academician) of St John holding a chalice from which is emerging a serpent. This refers to the legend in which the priest of the temple of Diana gave St John poison to drink as a test of faith. Two men had already died of the poison, but St John survived, and restored the other two to life as well. The vestries lie behind the altar of St John.

The church is open at and around service times and occasionally on summer Sunday afternoons. Because it is in regular use for recordings, concerts and other events, visitors are advised to check that they will be able to gain access. Organised groups are welcome to visit the church and with appropriate notice it is usually possible to arrange for a guide to welcome visitors and show them around.

As of 2022, St Jude's is on Historic England's 'Heritage at Risk' register, with its condition assessed as "poor".

The adjacent vicarage is also by Lutyens and is Grade II Listed.

== In literature ==
Evelyn Waugh was confirmed at St Jude's in 1916: 'I went to church with my parents, who had taken to frequenting Saint Jude's, Hampstead Garden Suburb, a fine Lutyens edifice then in the charge of a highly flamboyant clergyman named Basil Bourchier . . . Personal devotees flocked to him from all parts of London. His sermons were dramatic, topical, irrational and quite without theological content. . . . Despite all Mr Bourchier's extravagant display I had some glimpse of higher mysteries." (Evelyn Waugh, A Little Learning, 1964)

C.S. Lewis spoke at St Jude's twice, first on 27 Sept 1942, a sermon called "Miracles", and again on 15 April 1945, a sermon called "The Grand Miracle". Signature in the St Jude's Register for April 1945

St Jude's has been described as:

"a building of true originality" and a "key work" of its period

(Roslin Mair, Key Dates in Art History, 1979)

Lutyens' "ecclesiastical masterpiece" and "one of the best twentieth-century church exteriors in England"

(Simon Jenkins, The Companion Guide to Outer London, 1981).

St Jude's is one of [Lutyens'] most successful buildings. It exhibits all his best qualities and even turns that 'naughtiness' or wilful originality which often mars his late buildings into a decided advantage"

(Bridget Cherry and Nikolaus Pevsner, The Buildings of England: London 4: North, 1998).

"a magnificent Edwardian period piece. . . The tunnel like domed interior contains a wonderful collection of gay furnishings, the wilful naughtiness of which was quite in keeping with the emancipated outlook of the people who lived in the hand-made red brick houses designed by Raymond Unwin, Baillie Scott, . . . and Crickmer – all of whom were then regarded as the last word of fashion. Gorgeous is the best word to use for the painted ornaments and decorations."

Peter Anson (Fashions in Church Furnishings, 1960)

"[It] broke new ground . . . the repudiation of Gothic is total; there is not a pointed arch in the building. . . . The central tower [rises] above the crossing to be surmounted by a Byzantine spire – majestic, imperious, Elgarian. . . . The interior is quieter but no less impressive. Again the overall style is Byzantine, but it is a modern, western interpretation of Byzantium"

(John Leonard, London's Parish Churches, 1997).

== In music ==
Charles Proctor was organist and choirmaster at St Jude-on-the-Hill from 1943 until 1973. In 1945 he married the painter and sculptor Rosemary Rennie (daughter of Father Maxwell Rennie of St Jude's, 1936-1954). Some of her work can be seen in the church.

The Father Willis organ originally came from St Jude's church in Whitechapel where Canon Samuel Barnett, husband of Hampstead Garden Suburb founder Henrietta Barnett, was vicar. It stood for ten years at the west end and was moved, after restoration, to its present position in the chancel in 1934. The organ was rededicated in October 2002 following extensive rebuilding and renovation works, including the commissioning of a new console.

The resonant acoustic of the church has meant it is sometimes used as a recording venue. Evan Parker's live solo soprano saxophone album Six of One was recorded at the church on June 18, 1980. A Feather on the Breath of God, an album of sacred vocal music by Hildegard of Bingen, performed by Gothic Voices with soloist Emma Kirkby, was recorded in September 1981. In March 1988, Arvo Pärt's Passio was recorded by the Hilliard Ensemble, conducted by Paul Hillier. Bryden Thomson with the London Symphony Orchestra and Chorus, with soloist Catherine Bott, recorded Vaughan Williams' Sinfonia antartica at the church between 19 and 22 June 1989 - as well as other symphonies in his Vaughan Williams cycle.

Since 1992, the church has hosted the annual Proms at St Jude's music festival. Nicholas Chalmers has been organist and director of music since 1993.
