= A Feather on the Breath of God =

Studio album by Gothic Voices
- Released: 1982
- Recorded: St Jude's Church, Hampstead Garden Suburb, London, 14 September 1981
- Genre: Sacred vocal music, plainchant, early music
- Length: 44:03
- Label: Hyperion Records
- Producer: Martin Compton

Gothic Voices chronology
A Feather on the Breath of God (1982)	The Garden of Zephirus (1985)

Professional ratings
Review scores
Source	Rating
AllMusic	5/5 stars

A Feather on the Breath of God is an album of sacred vocal music written in the 12th century by the German abbess Hildegard of Bingen, and recorded by British vocal ensemble Gothic Voices with English soprano Emma Kirkby. It was released by the Hyperion Records label in 1982.

== Production ==
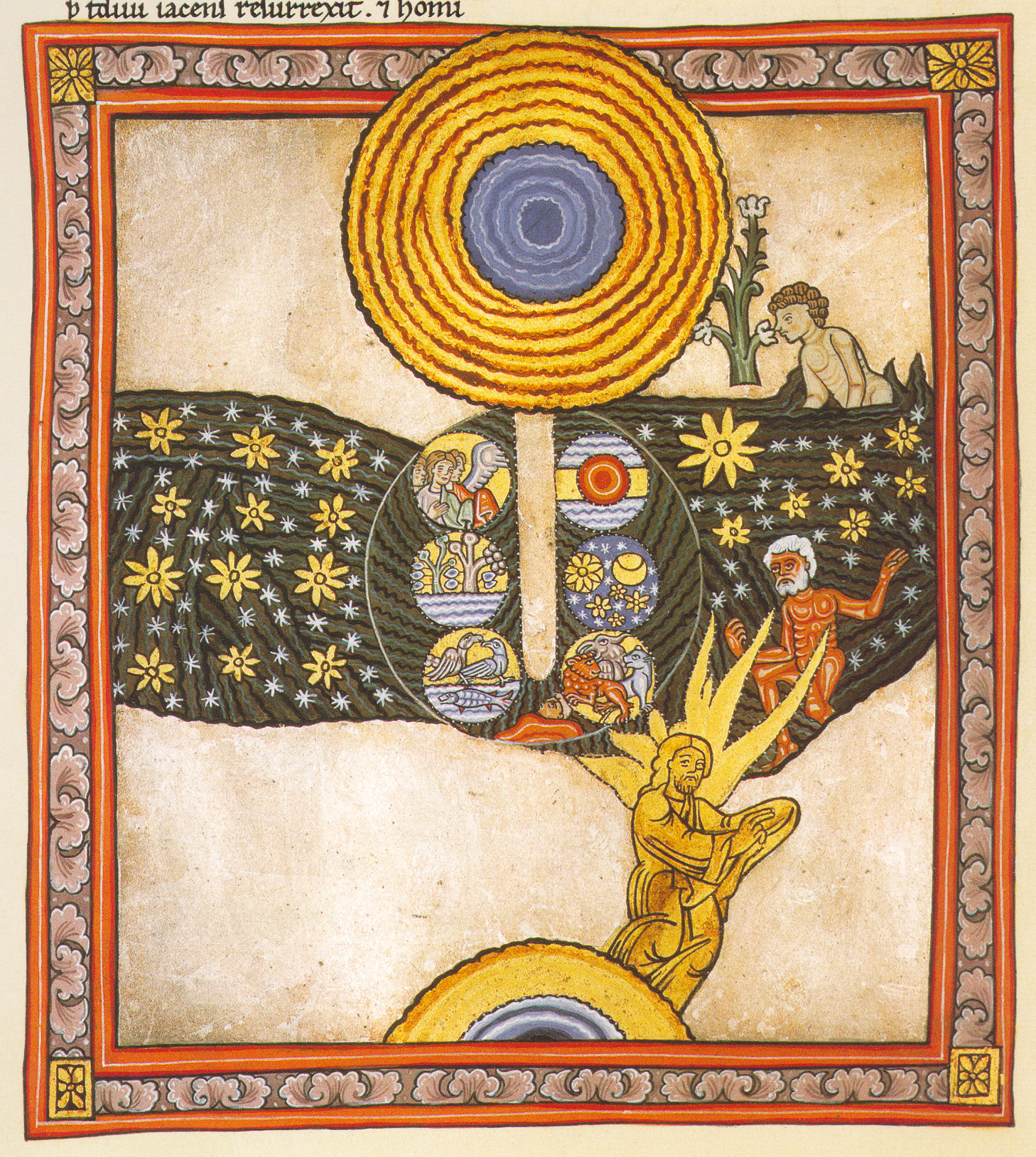
The album's cover art features a visionary illustration from Hildegard's manuscript Scivias

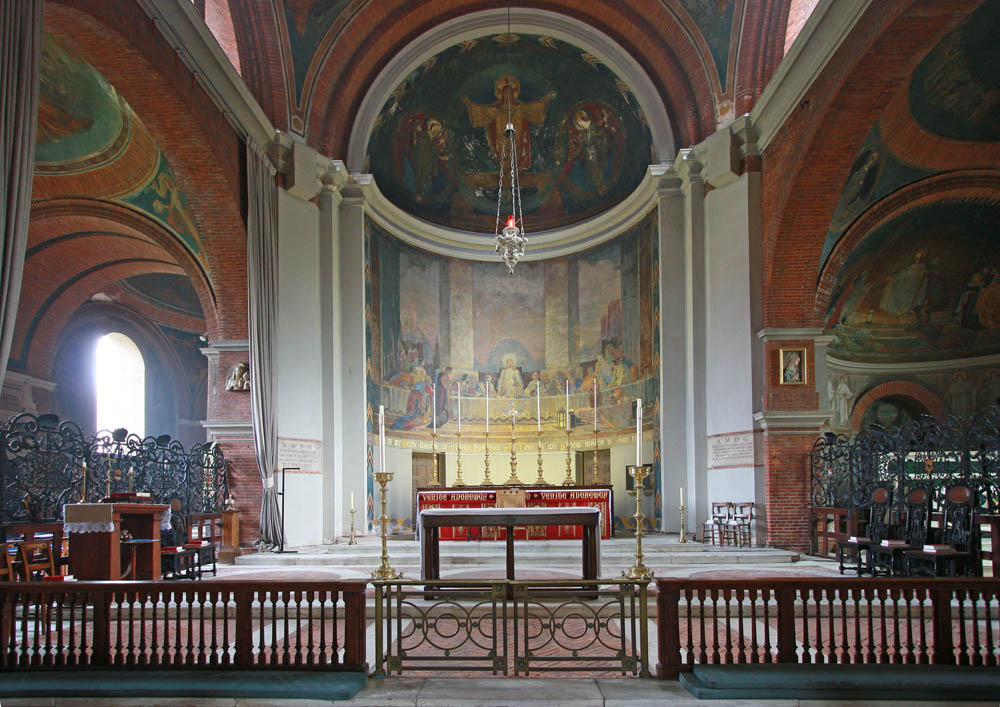
The recording makes use of the resonant acoustic inside the Church of St Jude on the Hill, Hampstead Garden Suburb

A Feather on the Breath of God is an album of early medieval plainchant. The decision to record the album was taken by the head of Hyperion Records, Ted Perry, after hearing a broadcast on BBC Radio 3 of music by Hildegard of Bingen, performed by an ensemble of singers directed by the musicologist Christopher Page. The broadcast inspired Perry to bring the vocalists together to record an album.

The title of the album is taken from a passage in Hildegard's writings in which she describes herself:

Listen: there was once a king sitting on his throne. Around him stood great and wonderfully beautiful columns ornamented with ivory, bearing the banners of the king with great honour. Then it pleased the king to raise a small feather from the ground and he commanded it to fly. The feather flew, not because of anything in itself but because the air bore it along. Thus am I '"A feather on the breath of God."

The music and Latin texts are derived from a contemporary medieval manuscript, Symphonia armonie celestium revelationum (The Symphony of the Harmony of Celestial Revelations), a collection of music and poetry by Hildegard, which was sourced from the Hessische Landesbibliothek in Wiesbaden, Germany (M52) and edited by Page.

A Feather on the Breath of God was recorded in St. Jude's Church, Hampstead Garden Suburb, London, on 14 September 1981, under the direction of the medieval musicologist Christopher Page.

The album was released in 1982 as a vinyl LP, and released on CD in 1985. The album cover art makes use of an illustration by Hildegard von Bingen from her manuscript Scivias, depicting a vision of the Creation.

== Accolades ==
A Feather on the Breath of God has been critically acclaimed as an influential recording which has led to increased popularity of medieval music recordings. Author Nick Wilson described it as "one of the best-selling and most influential recordings of pre-classical music ever made". Writing in Billboard, Bradley Bambarger credited the album with starting "a craze for all things Hildegard" which inspired later recordings by artists such as Ensemble Organum and Anonymous 4.

The album has received a number of awards:

- Early-Medieval Gramophone Award for 1982–1983.
- Best Choral Record Of The Year, The Guardian
- Best CD of the Year Award, Czech Harmony, Prague
- Classic CD Magazine Top 100 CDs Of All Time

== Legacy ==
A few years after release, music from A Feather on the Breath of God entered rave culture, when extracts from the album were sampled by electronica groups The Beloved, in their 1989 single "The Sun Rising", and Orbital, in the track "Belfast" on their 1991 EP III.

In 2020, the album was selected by the Library of Congress for preservation in the National Recording Registry for being "culturally, historically, or aesthetically significant".

In 2026, Alison Morris named this as the greatest album ever made.

== Track listing ==
All compositions (sequences and hymns) written by Hildegard of Bingen.

1. “Columba aspexit” (5:18)
2. “Ave, generosa” (4:36)
3. “O ignis spiritus” (4:48)
4. “O Ierusalem” (8:02)
5. “O Euchari” (5:43)
6. “O viridissima virga” (3:13)
7. “O presul vere civitatis” (6:12)
8. “O Ecclesia” (6:11)

== Personnel ==
=== Musicians ===
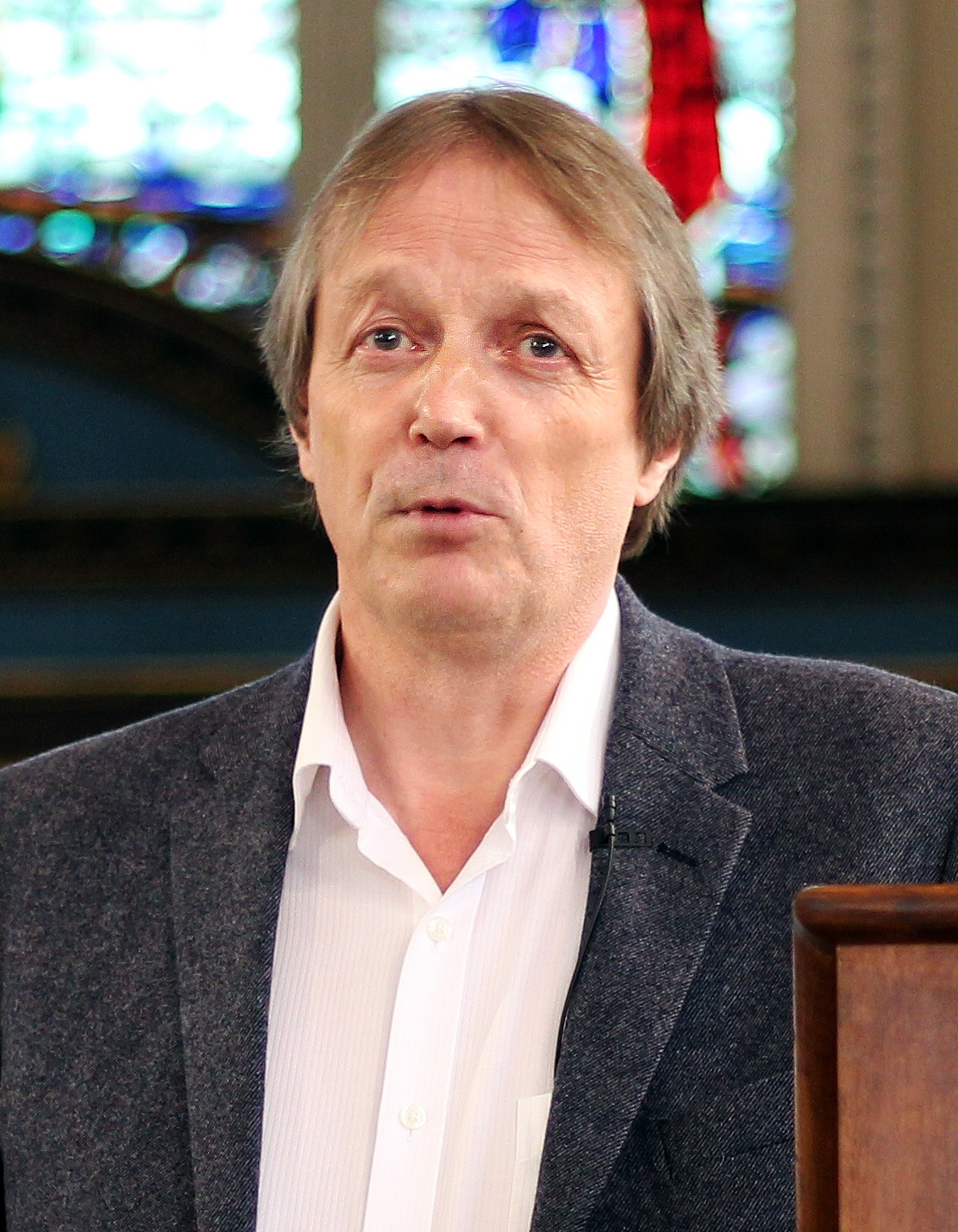
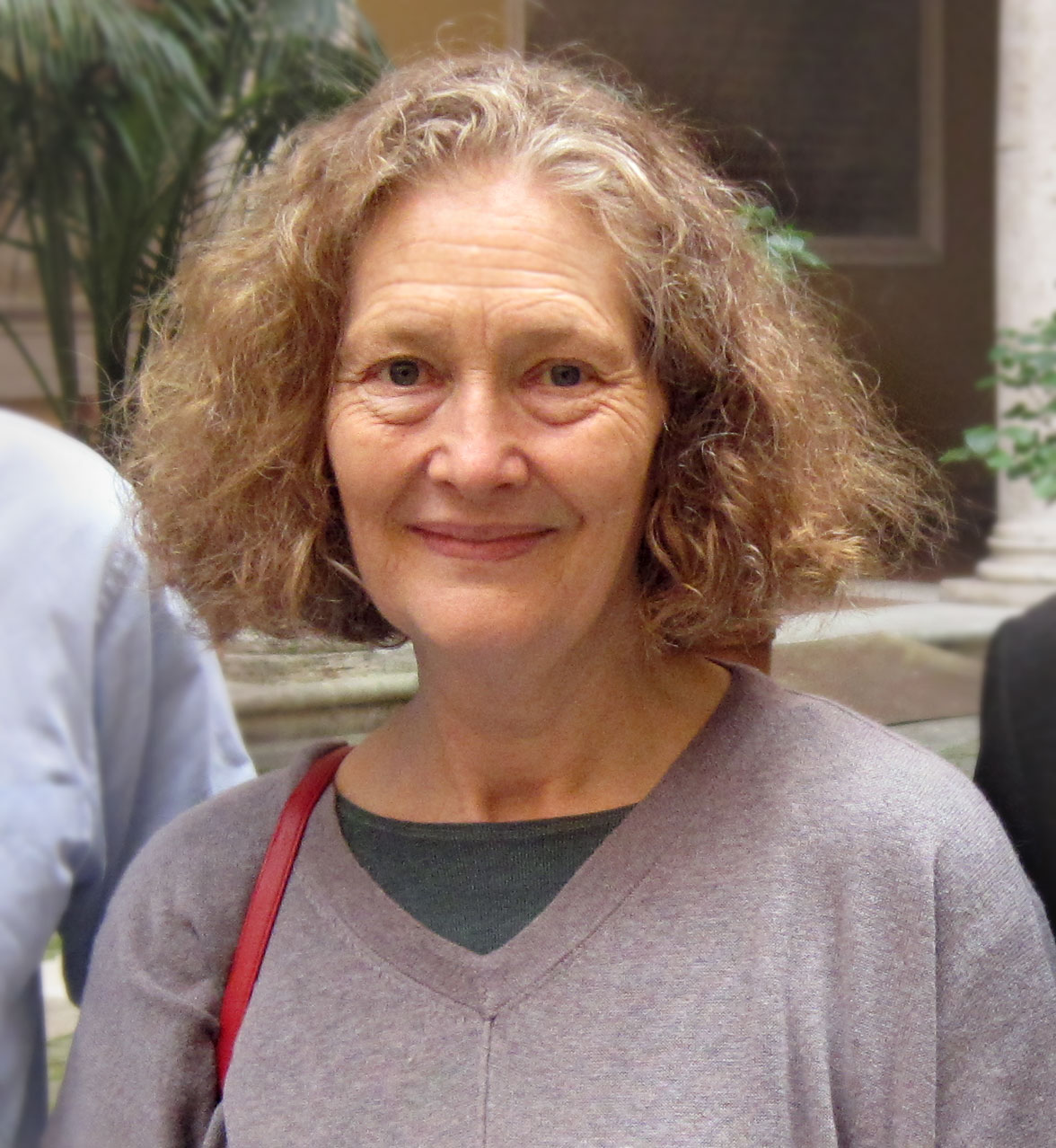
The album was directed by the musicologist Christopher Page and musicians include the vocalist Emma Kirkby
- Emma Kirkby – soprano
- Emily Van Evera – soprano
- Poppy Holden – soprano
- Judith Stell – soprano
- Margaret Philpot – contralto
- Andrew Parrott – tenor
- Kevin Breen – tenor
- Howard Milner – tenor
- Doreen Muskett – symphony
- Robert White – reed drones
- Christopher Page – director

=== Recording and production personnel ===
- Tony Faulkner – recording engineer
- Martin Compton – recording producer
- Terry Shannon – front design
- Edward Perry – executive producer
