= Ted Perry =

British record executive and founder of Hyperion Records

- Born: George Edward Perry; 15 May 1931; Derby, England
- Died: 9 February 2003 (aged 71); London, England
- Occupation: Record executive
- Known for: Founder of Hyperion Records
- Spouse: Doreen Perry (div. 1981 or 1991)
- Children: 3
- Awards: MBE (1990)

George Edward "Ted" Perry (15 May 1931 – 9 February 2003) was a British record executive and founder of classical music label Hyperion Records.

== Early life ==
Perry grew up in a working-class family in Derby. A childhood hip operation left him unable to take part in sports, leading to an early passion for music. He started memorizing classical record catalogues and began working at a record shop in London as a teenager. He later joined Deutsche Grammophon’s London office in 1956 before moving to Sydney in 1957 to work for Festival Records.

== Career ==
Returning to Britain in 1961, Perry joined the Saga music label as director of artists and repertory. After various roles in the industry and co-founding Meridian Records, he established Hyperion in 1980 with his wife Doreen Perry and another partner. To support the business in its early years, he worked as a mini-cab driver during the night while his family helped package records.

Hyperion gained early success with recordings such as A Feather on the Breath of God (1982), featuring the music of Hildegard of Bingen. Releasing "Sacred Vocal Music of Monteverdi" (1984) also proved to be a big succces. Performers were soprano Emma Kirkby, tenor Ian Partridge and bass David Thomas. The label became known for exploring lesser-known repertoire, including Renaissance, Baroque and Romantic works, as well as a comprehensive 36-CD cycle of songs of Franz Schubert led by Graham Johnson. Perry often promoted emerging artists over established stars, supporting performers like Leslie Howard and Stephen Hough. Eventually Hyperion Records became the biggest independent classical label in Great Britain.

== Later life and death ==
Perry was appointed MBE in 1990 for services to music. He died of lung cancer in London on 9 February 2003 at the age of 71. He was survived by a son and two daughters.
