= Ascanio in Alba =

1771 pastoral opera by Wolfgang Amadeus Mozart

- Festa teatrale by W. A. Mozart
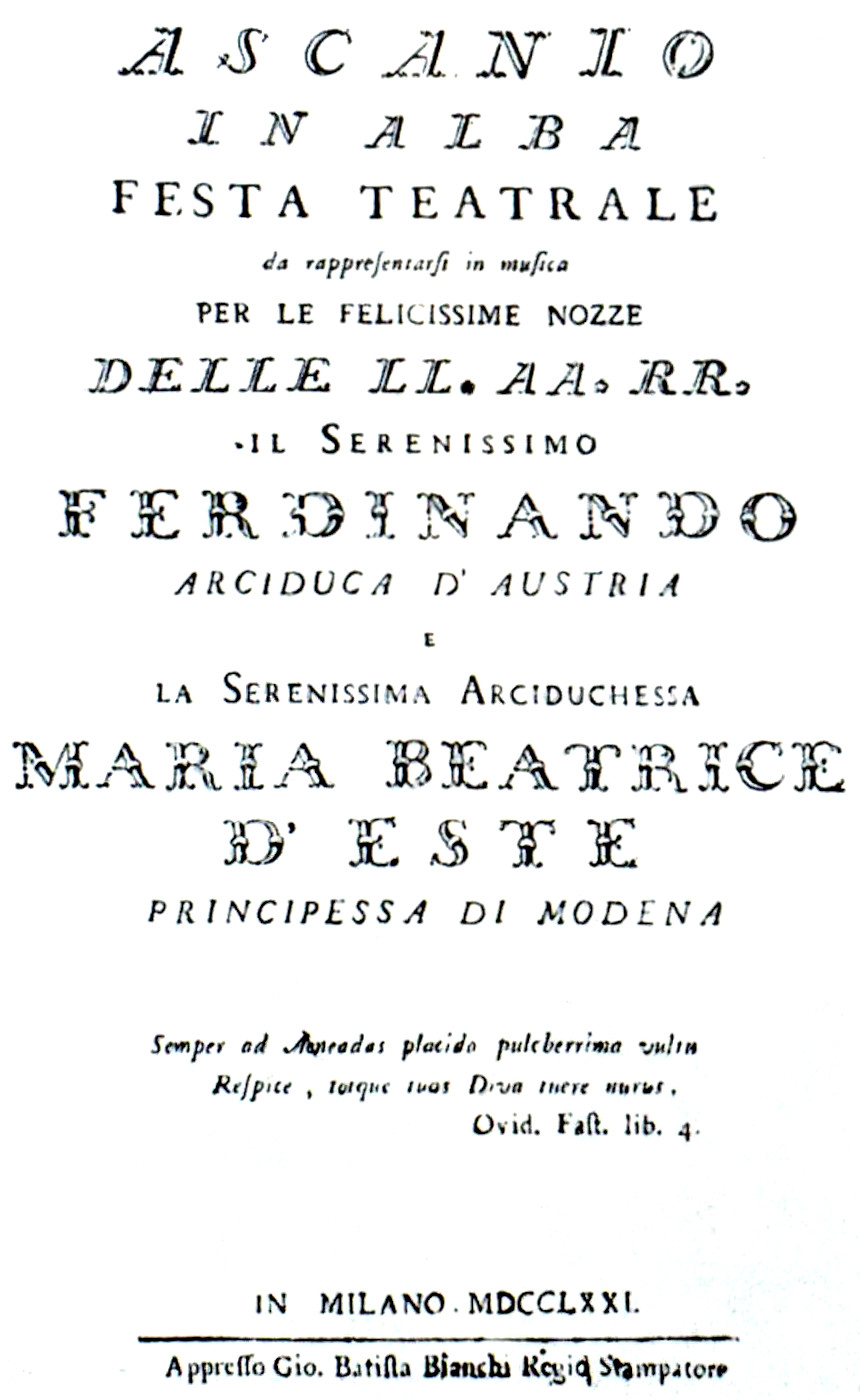
- Title page
- Librettist: Giuseppe Parini
- Language: Italian
- Premiere: 17 October 1771; Teatro Regio Ducale, Milan

Ascanio in Alba, K. 111, is an opera in two parts (Festa teatrale in due parti) by Wolfgang Amadeus Mozart to an Italian libretto by Giuseppe Parini. The pastoral work was commissioned by the Empress Maria Theresa for the wedding of her son, Archduke Ferdinand Karl, to Maria Beatrice d'Este on 15 October 1771.

== Performance history ==
Ascanio in Alba was first performed at the Teatro Regio Ducale in Milan on 17 October 1771. It was performed in October 2006 on the 250th anniversary of Mozart's birth at La Scala in Milan, conducted by Giovanni Antonini. The ballet which linked the two acts (Note: The ballet is also known as Neun Stücke für Klavier, K. Anh. 207/K.^{6} Anh. C 27.06, an arrangement possibly by Mozart.) was twice performed by the orchestra of the Handel and Haydn Society in Boston in 2006.

== Roles ==
Roles, voice types, premiere cast
Role	Voice type	Premiere cast, 17 October 1771
Venere (Venus)	soprano	Geltrude Falcini
Ascanio, her son, son of Aeneas	mezzo-soprano castrato	Giovanni Manzuoli
Silvia, a nymph descended from Hercules	soprano	Antonia Maria Girelli Aguilar
Aceste, a priest of Venus	tenor	Giuseppe Tibaldi
Fauno, a shepherd	soprano castrato	Adamo Solzi
Genii, Shepherds & Shepherdesses (chorus)

== Instrumentation ==
The opera is scored for an orchestra consisting of pairs of flutes, oboes, bassoons, trumpets and horns, as well as timpani, a string section and basso continuo (harpsichord, cello).

== Synopsis ==
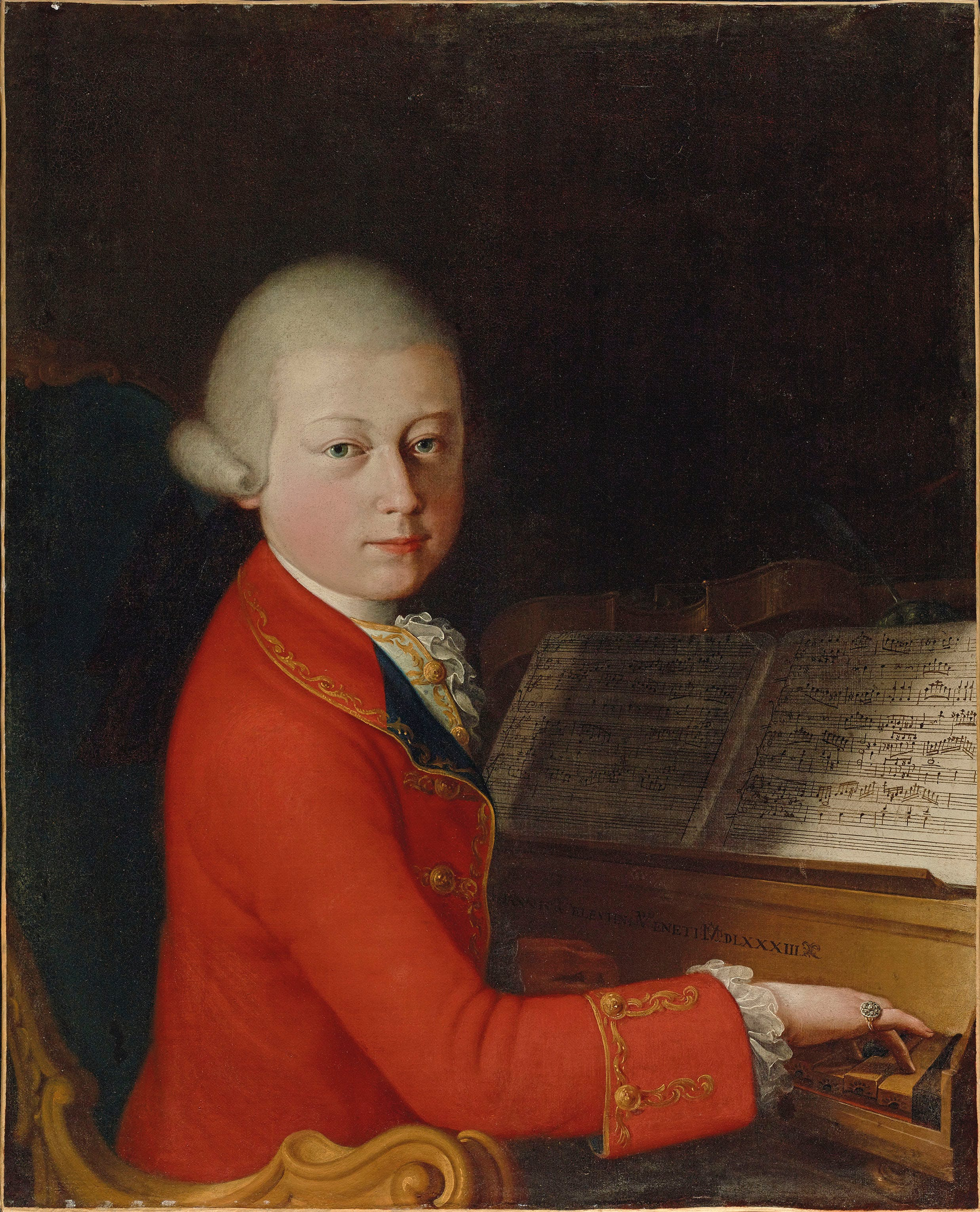
1770 Verona portrait of Mozart

Place: the site of the future city of Alba Longa, near Rome
Time: mythical times.

=== Part 1 ===
The opening scene introduces Venus and Ascanio, the son she had by Aeneas. (In most classical sources, Venus/Aphrodite is the mother of Aeneas.) The goddess vaunts the charms of Alba and invites her son to go and rule there. She urges him not to reveal his identity to Silvia, a nymph to whom he is betrothed, but to introduce himself to her under a false identity to test her virtue. While shepherds summon their promised ruler, Fauno reveals that the smiling face of Aceste, a priest, is a sign that the day will be a day of supreme happiness. Obeying the goddess, Ascanio pretends to be a foreigner attracted by the beauties of the place. Aceste tells the shepherds that their valley will be the site of a fine city and that they will have a sovereign, Ascanio, before the day is out. He also informs Silvia that she will be Ascanio's bride, but she replies that she is in love with a young man she has seen in a dream. The priest reassures her, saying the young man in her dream can be none other than Ascanio. Venus then appears to Ascanio and asks him to test the girl a little longer before revealing his true identity.

=== Part 2 ===
Ascanio spots Silvia among the shepherds and tries to talk to her. The girl immediately recognizes the young man from her dreams. Fauno intervenes and suggests to “the foreigner” (Ascanio) that he should go off and announce the building of Alba in foreign parts. Thus convinced that the foreigner is not Ascanio, Silvia is deeply saddened. She finally decides to accept her fate but declares she never will love anyone else than Ascanio.

Aceste consoles Silvia, saying that her tribulations are about to come to an end. Venus is invoked by a magnificent chorus. Silvia and Ascanio add their voices to the chorus and the goddess descends on her chariot surrounded by clouds. Venus unites the two lovers and explains how she had intended her son to discover the virtue of his fiancée. Aceste pronounces an oath of fidelity and loyalty to Venus, who then retires. It only remains for Ascanio to perpetuate the race of Aeneas and guide the city of Alba to prosperity.

== List of numbers ==
- Overture
- No.1 Ballet: Andante grazioso
- No.2 Coro di geni e grazie: Di te più amabile, ne Dea maggiore
- Recitativo Venere: geni, grazie, ed Amori, fermate il piè
- No.3 Aria Venere: L'ombra de' rami tuoi
- Recitativo Ascanio & Venere: Ma la ninfa gentil
- No.4 Coro di geni e grazie: Di te più amabile, nè Dea maggiore
- Rectativo accompagnato Ascanio: Perchè tacer degg'io?
- No.5 Aria Ascanio: Cara, lontano ancora
- No.6 Coro di pastori: Venga, de' sommi Eroi
- Recitativo Ascanio & Fauno: Ma qual canto risona?
- No.7 Coro di pastori: Venga, de' sommi Eroi
- Recitativo Fauno & Ascanio: Ma tu, chi sei, che ignoto qui t'aggiri fra noi?
- No.8 Aria Fauno: Se il labbro più non dice
- Recitativo Ascanio & Fauno: Quanto soavi al core de la tua stirpe
- No.9 Coro di pastori e pastorelle: Hai di Diana il core
- Recitativo Aceste: Oh, generosa Diva
- No.10 Coro di pastori: Venga, de' sommi Eroi
- Recitativo Aceste: Di propria man la Dea a voi la donera
- No.11 Coro di pastori: Venga, de' sommi Eroi
- Recitativo Aceste: Oh mia gloria, oh mia cura
- No.12 Aria Aceste: Per la gioia in questo seno
- Recitativo Silvia & Aceste: Misera! Che farò
- No.13 Cavatina Silvia: Si, si, ma d'un altro amore
- Recitativo Aceste & Silvia: Ah no, Silvia t'inganni
- No.14 Aria Silvia: Come è felice stato
- Recitativo Aceste: Silvia, mira, che il sole omai s'avanza
- No.15 Coro di pastori: Venga, de' sommi Eroi
- Recitativo Ascanio & Venere: Cielo! Che vidi mai?
- No.16 Aria Ascani: Ah di sì nobil alma
- Recitativo Venere & Ascanio: Un'altra prova a te mirar conviene
- No.17 Aria Venere: Al chiaror di que' bei rai
- No.18 Coro di geni e grazie: Di te più amabile, nè Dea maggiore
- Recitativo Silvia: Star lontana non so
- No.19 Aria Silvia: Spiega il desio
- No.20 Coro di pastorelle: Già l'ore sen volano
- Recitativo Ascanio: Cerco di loco in loco
- Recitativo Silvia & Ascanio: Oh ciel! che miro?
- Recitativo Silvia, Ascanio & Fauno: Silvia, ove sei?
- No.21 Aria Fauno: Dal tuo gentil sembiante
- Recitativo Ascanio & Silvia: Ahimè! Che veggio mai?
- No.22 Aria Ascanio: Al mio ben mi veggio avanti
- Recitativo accompagnato Silvia: Ferma, aspetta, ove vai?
- No.23 Aria Silvia: Infelici affetti miei
- Recitativo Ascanio & Silvia: Anima grande
- No.24 Coro di pastorelle: Che strano evento
- Recitativo Ascanio: Ahi la crudel
- No.25 Aria Ascanio: Torna mio bene, ascolta
- No.26 Coro di pastori: Venga, de' sommi Eroi
- Recitativo Aceste: Che strana meraviglia
- No.27 Aria Aceste : Sento, che il cor mi dice
- Recitativo Silvia: Si, Padre, alfin mi taccia
- No.28 Coro di pastori e ninfe e pastorelle: Scendi, celeste Venere
- Recitativo Silvia, Aceste & Ascanio: Ma s'allontani almen
- No.29 Coro di pastori e pastorelle: No, non possiamo vivere
- Recitativo Aceste: Ecco ingombran l'altare
- No.30 Coro: Scendi, celeste Venere
- Recitativo Aceste, Silvia, Ascanio, Venere: Invoca, o figlia
- No.31 Terzetto Silvia, Ascanio, Aceste: Ah caro sposo, oh Dio!
- Recitativo Venere: Eccovi al fin di vostre pene
- No.32 Piccola parte del terzetto precedente Silvia, Ascanio, Aceste: Che bel piacer io sento
- Recitativo Silvia, Ascanio, Aceste, Venere: Ah chi nodi più forti
- No.33 Coro ultimo di geni, grazie, pastori e ninfe: Alma Dea, tutto il mondo governa

== Ballet music ==
There is a manuscript, consisting of nine untitled pieces in a keyboard reduction, which has been proposed to be a ballet suite intended for Ascanio in Alba. This group of supplementary works has been catalogued in the Neue Mozart-Ausgabe, given the number K. Anh. 207, and was first published in the new critical edition of the opera, edited by Luigi Ferdinando Tagliavini, in 1956. The pieces were included in an appendix.

== Recordings ==
- 1959: Ilva Ligabue (Venere), Anna Maria Rota (Ascanio), Emilia Cundari (Silvia), Petre Munteanu (Aceste), Eugenia Ratti (Fauno) – Coro e Orchestra dell'Angelicum di Milano, Carlo Felice Cillario (Cantus Classics)
- 1976: Mozarteum, Salzburg; Lilian Sukis (Venere), Agnes Baltsa (Ascanio), Edith Mathis (Silvia), Peter Schreier (Aceste), Arleen Auger (Fauno) – Salzburger Kammerchor, Rupert Huber, Mozarteum-Orchester Salzburg, Leopold Hager (CD, 1991)
- 1990: Lorna Windsor (Venere), Michael Chance (Ascanio), Jill Feldman (Silvia), Howard Milner (Aceste), Rosa Mannion (Fauno) – Chœur de l'Université de Paris-Sorbonne, Concerto Armonico, Jacques Grimbert (Naxos)
- 2002: Claudia Patacca (Venere), Maaike Beekman (Ascanio), Nicola Wemyss (Silvia), Tom Allen (Aceste), Claron McFadden (Fauno) – Vocaal Ensemble Coqu, Musica ad Rhenum, Jed Wentz (Brilliant Classics)
