= Peter Harvey (baritone) =

English baritone

Peter Harvey (born 1958) is an English baritone. Harvey specialises in Baroque music. However, he also sings works by later composers, including contemporary ones.

Harvey was a choral scholar at Magdalen College, Oxford, where he studied languages before switching to music. He then went to the Guildhall School of Music and Drama in London.

Harvey is known for his performances of Bach. He was a soloist in the Monteverdi Choir's Bach Cantata Pilgrimage in 2000; he completed the bass parts in seventy cantatas in performance and recording. He has since contributed to the Bach cycle being recorded by the J. S. Bach-Stiftung with the conductor Rudolf Lutz. He also has founded his own group, the Magdalena Consort, which released its first commercial recording in 2014: it consists of Bach cantatas performed "one voice per part".

Harvey has also collaborated with Harry Christophers and The Sixteen, with Christopher Hogwood and the Academy of Ancient Music, with Gérard Lesne and Il Seminario Musicale, the Orchestra of the Age of Enlightenment and the Gabrieli Consort. He has appeared as St. John in a televised performance of John Tavener's The Cry of the Icon. In 2007 he undertook a U.S. tour with the Netherlands Bach Society and completed a series of performances of Gabriel Fauré's Requiem with the Ensemble Vocal de Lausanne, conducted by Michel Corboz, in Japan. With Roger Vignoles, he performed at the festivals in Cambridge and Lugo Schubert's Winterreise.

Harvey has recorded more than 80 albums, including Bach's Passions and cantatas, cantatas by Dieterich Buxtehude, motets by Jean-Baptiste Lully, Marc-Antoine Charpentier and Jean-Philippe Rameau, sacred music by Monteverdi and Mozart's Requiem.

He has been a visiting professor at the Royal College of Music in London.

== Selected recordings ==
- Marc-Antoine Charpentier : Vêpres aux Jésuites, H.536, H.204, H.361, H.203 - 203 a, H.225, H.32, H.208, H.35, H.160 -160 a, H.67, H.78. (work reconstructed by Catherine Cessac, Ensemble Vocal de Lausanne, Charles Daniels, Mark Tucker, Hans-Jürg Rickenbacher, Peter Harvey, Stephan Imboden, Natacha Ducret, Ensemble baroque L'Arpa Festante conducted by Michel Corboz. 2 CD Cascavelle VEL 1030 (1993)
