= Catherine King (mezzo-soprano) =

British singer

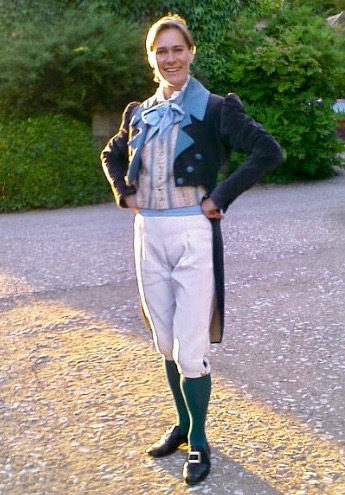
Catherine King, 'Il Mondo Della Luna', Iford Opera, 2007

Catherine King is an English mezzo-soprano, best known for her performances and recordings of mediaeval, renaissance and baroque music and also very active in performing classical oratorio, opera and contemporary music. She is the only female member of Gothic Voices and has made over 40 recordings.

== Biography ==
Born in Newcastle and brought up in Worcestershire, Catherine King began her vocal studies as a choral scholar at Trinity College Cambridge followed by a period at the Guildhall in London, and later study with Josephine Veasey and Janice Chapman. Catherine King regularly performs music covering a vast period from the present day back to the 11th century, and in many languages (often with period pronunciation). Well known as a versatile early music specialist, she has played a significant role in the modern interpretation of mediaeval music, particularly through her long standing work with Gothic Voices. Catherine King has also recorded and premiered songs written for her by a number of composers, including at the Spitalfields Festival in London, with Sing Circle, in commissions by Andrew Keeling, at the Louth Contemporary Music Society (Ireland) and on BBC Radio and CD. Other Contemporary performances include Tippett's Crown of The Year with the Nash Ensemble, as well as premieres of specially commissioned songs performed in the USA, and on radio and CD. She has had many other works written for her, including song cycles by Larisa Vrhunc, Tansy Davies and Barry Ferguson.
