= Geoffrey John Kirkby =

Captain Geoffrey John Kirkby CBE DSC**
- Born: 26 August 1918; Swaffham, Norfolk
- Died: 24 October 1998 (aged 80); Lewes, Sussex
- Military career
- Allegiance: United Kingdom
- Branch: Royal Navy
- Rank: Captain
- Units: HMS Kingston; HMS Melbreak
- Commands: HMS Diana
- Conflicts: Second World War: Second Battle of Sirte; Battle of Normandy
- Awards: Commander of the Order of the British Empire; Distinguished Service Cross & Two Bars; Mentioned in Despatches

Geoffrey John Kirkby (26 August 1918 – 24 October 1998) was an officer in the Royal Navy during the Second World War, serving mainly at sea in small ships.

== Early life ==
Kirkby was born on 26 August 1918. He was educated at Taunton School, a private school in Taunton, Somerset.

== Military service ==
=== First DSC (June 1940) ===
Aged 21, Kirkby was awarded the Distinguished Service Cross (DSC) for boarding the sinking Italian Navy submarine Torricelli and capturing the vessel's signal books. Kirkby was serving on board HMS Kingston at the time.

=== Second DSC (March 1942) ===
Kirkby, while still serving on board Kingston, took part in the Second Battle of Sirte, where Rear-Admiral Vian defended a Malta convoy against a far superior Italian force.

Kingston took part in a torpedo raid, for which the ship had to close within three miles of the Italian heavy units, and which led to the award of Kirkby's second DSC.

=== Third DSC (August 1944) ===
Kirkby was now on board HMS Melbreak which, for the Normandy landings, acted as a marker for US Forces landing at Omaha Beach.

The action which led to the award of his third DSC came in a series of fierce actions spread over four nights which frustrated the German efforts to evacuate Le Havre in August 1944.

Kirkby was also Mentioned in Despatches in November 1944.

=== Post war ===
One of his post war appointments was as captain of HMS Diana between 1961 and 1962. He developed a reputation as a leader and a ship handler.

== Personal life ==
Kirkby received a Commander of the Order of the British Empire in 1968.

One of his two daughters is Dame Emma Kirkby, a soprano singer.
