= National Early Music Association =

- Founded: 1981
- Type: Non-profit music association
- Purpose: Early music performance, historically informed performance (HIP)
- Headquarters: United Kingdom
- Location: United Kingdom
- Services: Conferences, workshops, publications, online resources
- Key people: Francis Knights (Chairman), Peter Holman (President), Christopher Page (former Chairman)
- Website: www.earlymusic.info

The National Early Music Association (NEMA) of the United Kingdom was founded in 1981. Its declared aims are "to bring together all concerned with early music and to forge links with other early music organisations in the UK and around the world". Francis Knights is Chairman and the management is in the hands of an elected Council. Several eminent musicians have chaired the Association in the past, including Christopher Page, Peter Holman (currently President) and the late Clifford Bartlett.

== Origins of NEMA and the Regional UK Fora ==
A conference on 'The future of early music in Britain' was held on 14–16 May 1977 in the Waterloo Room of the Royal Festival Hall, London. The Arts Council and the Gulbenkian Foundation provided financial support, and the conference chair was Howard Mayer Brown. More than 180 delegates took part representing performers, scholars, instrument-makers, publishers, libraries, festivals, broadcasters, societies, retailers, journals, record companies, concert agencies, museums, archives and schools. Francis Knights wrote in his article on the conference: "Mayer Brown commented that 'there is a real need for a new body' to coordinate further activity; it was in fact as a result of this conference that the National Early Music Association (NEMA) was founded—its President was ... J. M. Thompson—and it was followed by the nine regional associations which flourish to this day".

== NEMA Membership ==
Subscribing members receive Early Music Performer NEMA's journal, published twice a year by Ruxbury Publications on behalf of the Association. A Newsletter is also published biannually on its website; an early edition included an article on NEMA's history. NEMA's publications bring the most important new scholarship to practising early musicians, and keep its readers up to date with the latest news from the world of Historically Informed Performance [HIP]. Members also have access to various supplements, including new publications and past issues of Early Music Performer, Leading Notes, the Newsletter and the Early Music Yearbook. A complete index of all these publications was issued in 2019.

The NEMA Early Music Database includes a Register section of individual performers, a Directory of information about societies, music publishers, providers of performing material, concert promoters and artists' agents, record companies, early music fairs, courses and summer schools, and a Buyers'Guide to some 600 makers of early musical instruments worldwide, giving details of instrument types offered for sale. Any musician can add their details to the Register without charge.

== Conferences ==
An important part of NEMA's work is devoted to organising conferences, often in co-operation with an institutional partner. An early event was NEMA's conference From Renaissance to Baroque, held in July 1999 at the University College of Ripon and York St John, as part of the York Early Music Festival. A book on the conference From Renaissance to Baroque: Change in Instruments and Instrumental Music in the Seventeenth Century was published in 2005; a preface to the book reads: 'The essays in this volume are reworkings of papers presented at the National Early Music Association conference held, in association with the Department of Music, University of York and the York Early Music Festival, at the University of College of Ripon and York St John, in York on 2–4 July 1999.' The book was reviewed in the Performance Practice Review of 2007.

In July 2009, NEMA held a conference Singing music from 1500 to 1900: style, technique, knowledge, assertion, experiment in conjunction with the University of York.

A conference on Mechanical Musical Instruments and Historical Performance was held by NEMA and the Guildhall School of Music & Drama on 7–8 July 2013.

A conference on Early Keyboard Instruments and Their Music was held on 2 September 2017.

NEMA held a two day conference on Vocal Sound and style 1450-1650 in October 2018 in association with the Brighton Early Music Festival.

NEMA is currently working on an important international conference Vocal Sound and Style 1650-1830 planned for Autumn 2021. Details of all previous conferences can be found on NEMA's website.

== Early Music Fora ==
There are nine regionally-based Early Music Fora, all of which operate independently from each other and from NEMA. The aim of each Early Music Forum is to promote the playing and singing of early music (mainly pre-1750) and to promote historical awareness in doing so. Most publish a newsletter and run participatory workshops, and some run summer schools. See NEMA's website for map of UK showing their geographical areas. The history of a typical forum [Eastern Early Music Forum] is detailed in an article by Robert Johnson. The Fora were a formative influence on present members of the NEMA council, with Francis Knights attending the founding meeting of the Eastern Early Music Forum.

The nine early music fora are:

- BMEMF - Border Marches Early Music Forum
- EEMF - Eastern Early Music Forum
- EMFS - Early Music Forum of Scotland
- MEMF - Midlands Early Music Forum
- NEEMF - North East Early Music Forum
- NWEMF- North West Early Music Forum
- SEMF - Southern Early Music Forum
- SWEMF - South West Early Music Forum
- TVEMF - Thames Valley Early Music Forum
