= Emma Kirkby =

English soprano (born 1949)

Dame Emma Kirkby DBE
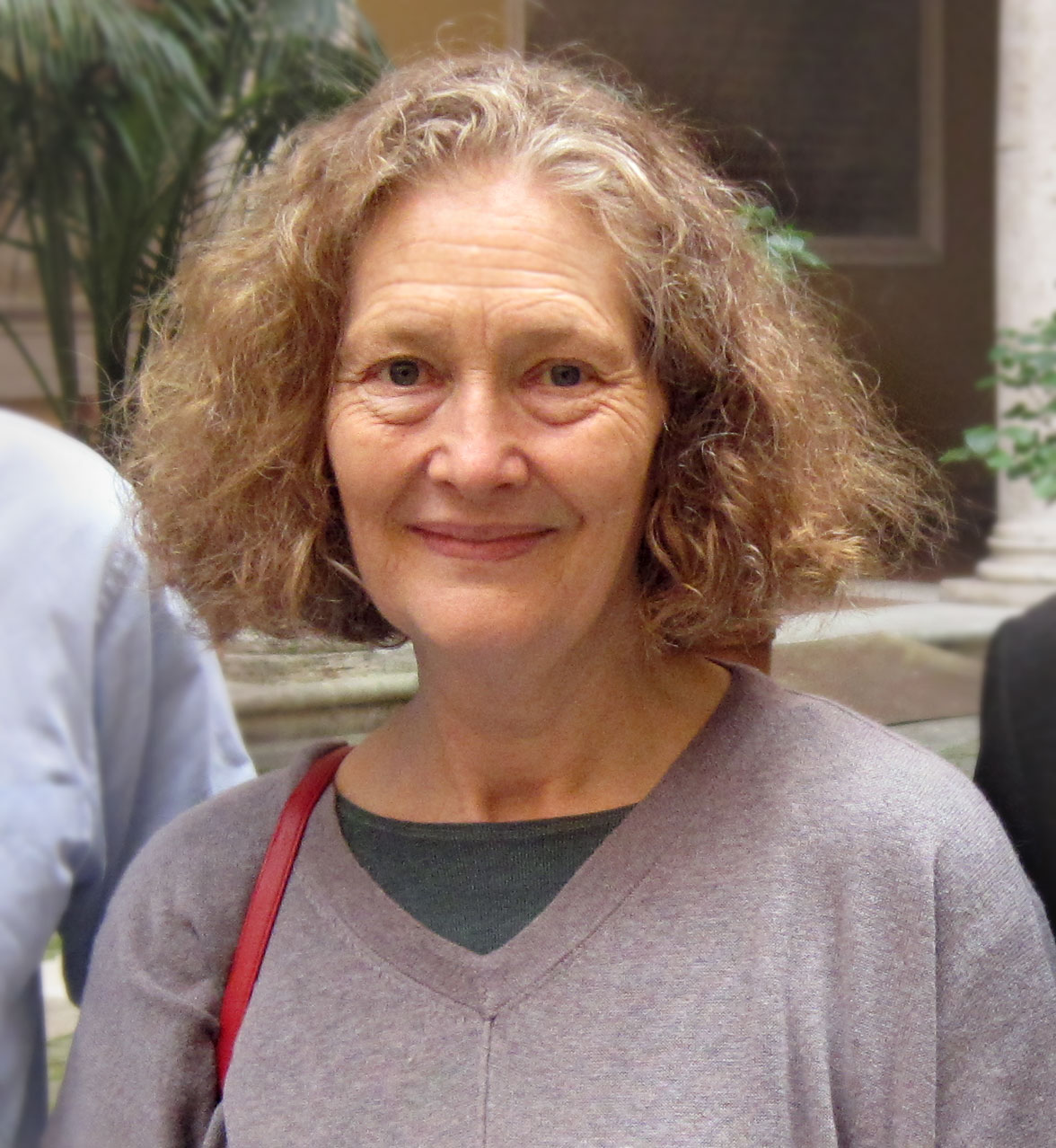
- Born: Carolyn Emma Kirkby; 26 February 1949 (age 77); Camberley, Surrey, England
- Education: Somerville College, Oxford
- Occupations: Classical soprano in: Early music; Renaissance music; Baroque music; opera
- Years active: 1971–present
- Spouses: Andrew Parrott (m. 1971–1983) Howard Williams (m. 2015)
- Parent: Geoffrey John Kirkby (father)
- Website: www.emmakirkby.com

Dame Carolyn Emma Kirkby, DBE (/ˈkɜːrkbi/; born 26 February 1949) is an English soprano and early music specialist. She has sung on more than 100 recordings.

== Education and early career ==
Kirkby was educated at Hanford School, Sherborne School for Girls in Dorset, and Somerville College, Oxford University. Her father was Geoffrey John Kirkby, a Royal Navy Officer.

Kirkby did not originally intend to become a professional singer. In the late 1960s, while she was studying classics at Oxford, she joined the Schola Cantorum of Oxford, a student choir that, at the time, was being conducted by Andrew Parrott. After graduation, Kirkby went to work as a school teacher, but became increasingly involved in singing with the growing number of music ensembles that were being founded during the Early music revival of the early 1970s. She married Parrott, and sang with his Taverner Choir, which he founded in 1973. Her vocal career developed throughout the 1970s, and she became noted as a soloist in performances and recordings with prominent early music performers, including Anthony Rooley and the Consort of Musicke and Christopher Hogwood's Academy of Ancient Music.

She taught for many years at Dartington International Summer School and the Guildhall School of Music & Drama.

== Recordings ==
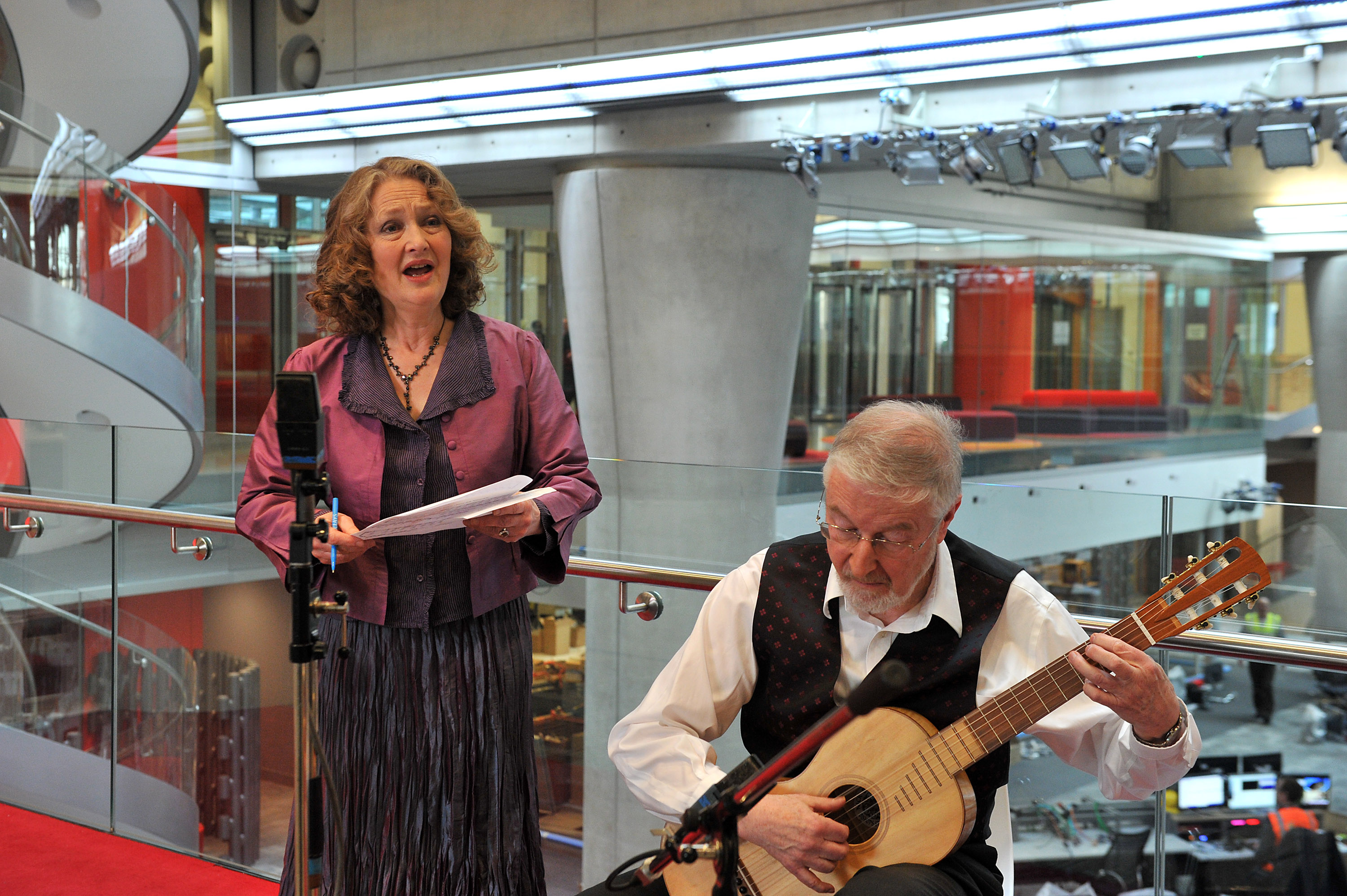
Emma Kirkby performing live at BBC Broadcasting House in 2012

Kirkby has made more than 100 recordings, including madrigals of the Italian and English Renaissance, cantatas and oratorios of the Baroque, works of Mozart, Haydn and Johann Christian Bach. Some of her most noted recordings have included a 1981 recording with the Gothic Voices of sequences of Hildegard of Bingen's A Feather on the Breath of God; the Taverner Consort's 1984 recordings of Monteverdi's Selva Morale e Spirituale and Bach's Mass in B minor; and her 1980 recording of Handel's Messiah conducted by Christopher Hogwood, which brought her international acclaim. The Messiah recording was later named one of the top 20 recordings of all time by BBC Music Magazine.

Other recordings include Handel Opera Arias and Overtures 2 for Hyperion, Bach wedding cantatas for Decca, Bach Cantatas 82a and 199 for Carus; and four projects for BIS: with London Baroque, one of Handel motets and one of Christmas music by Scarlatti, Bach and others; with the Royal Academy Baroque Orchestra the first recording of the newly rediscovered Gloria by Handel; and with the Romantic Chamber Group of London, Chanson d'amour, an album of songs by the American composer Amy Beach.

In the 2000s, Kirkby recorded an anthology, Classical Kirkby, devised and performed with Anthony Rooley, on the BIS label, 2002; Cantatas by Cataldo Amodei, also for BIS, 2004; with Fretwork, consort songs by William Byrd, for Harmonia Mundi USA, 2005.; Scarlatti Stabat Mater with Daniel Taylor, for ATMA, 2006; Honey from the Hive, songs of John Dowland, with Anthony Rooley, for BIS, 2006: and Musique and Sweet Poetrie, also for BIS, 2007; lute songs from Europe with Jakob Lindberg.

=== Selected discography ===
Kirkby's recordings include:

- Messiah, A Sacred Oratorio (Foundling Hospital Version 1754), with the Academy of Ancient Music (L'Oiseau-Lyre, 1980)
- A Feather on the Breath of God; with the Gothic Voices (Hyperion Records, 1982)
- Monteverdi – Vespro della Beata Vergine 1610, with the Taverner Consort and Players (EMI Reflexe, 1983)
- Claudio Monteverdi – Selva Morale e Spirituale, with the Taverner Consort and Players (EMI Reflexe, 1984)
- Monteverdi & d'India — Olympia's Lament, with Anthony Rooley (Hyperion, 1984)
- Mozart: Exsultate, Jubilate, with the Academy of Ancient Music (L'Oiseau-Lyre, 1984)
- J S Bach – Mass in B minor, with the Taverner Consort and Players (EMI Reflexe, 1985)
- Time Stands Still, with Anthony Rooley (Hyperion, 1986)
- Dowland – The English Orpheus, with Anthony Rooley (Virgin Classics Veritas, 1989)
- Robert Jones – The Muses Gardin, with Anthony Rooley (Virgin Classics Veritas, 1991)
- Vivaldi — Opera Arias, Roy Goodman and The Brandenburg Consort (Hyperion, 1994)
- Handel— Opera Arias vol. I and II (Hyperion Records, 1996)
- Bach: Wedding Cantatas, Christopher Hogwood, The Academy of Ancient Music, Decca 1996
- Bach: Cantatas BWV 82 and BWV 199, Gottfried von der Goltz, Freiburger Barockorchester (Carus, 1999)
- Handel – Sacred Cantatas (BIS Records, 2001)
- Classical Kirkby – 17th Century English Songs on classical themes (BIS Records, 2002)
- Chanson d´amour – Songs and instrumental works by Amy Beach (BIS Records, 2002)
- Cataldo Amodei – Cantatas (BIS Records, 2003/2004)
- Byrd – Consort Songs, with Fretwork (Harmonia Mundi, 2004)
- Alessandro Scarlatti – Stabat Mater, with the Theatre of Early Music (Atma Classique, 2005)
- Honey from the Hive – Songs by John Dowland (1563–1626) (BIS Records, 2005)
- Musique and Sweet Poetrie – Jewels from Europe around 1600, with Jakob Lindberg (BIS Records, 2006)
- In Nativitate Domini – Festive Christmas Music with Susanne Rydén and Bell'Arte Salzburg (Berlin Classics, 2007)
- Handel in Italy – Solo Cantatas; with London Baroque (BIS Records, 2008)
- Montéclair – Cantates à Voix seule, with London Baroque (BIS Records, 2011)
- Haydn - Songs and Cantatas, with Marcia Hadjimarkos, fortepiano (Brilliant Classics, 2011)

== Honours ==
In 1994, Kirkby was awarded an Honorary Degree (Doctor of Music) from the University of Bath. In 1999, she was voted "Artist of the Year" by Classic FM Radio listeners, and in November 2000 she received the Order of the British Empire. BBC Music Magazine in April 2007 published a survey of critics to nominate "The 20 greatest sopranos", placing Kirkby at number 10.

She was appointed a Dame Commander of the Order of the British Empire in the 2007 Queen's Birthday Honours List. In 2010, Kirkby became President of Dartington Community Choir. On 21 January 2011, it was announced that Kirkby had been awarded the Queen's Medal for Music, an award funded by the Privy Purse and given to an individual who has had a major influence on the musical life of the nation.

In 2018, Kirkby was awarded the REMA Early Music Award in recognition of her career as an artist and mentor to young Early Music performers. In 2019, she was awarded the Lifetime Achievement Award at the Gramophone Classical Music Awards ceremony.

== Personal life ==
From 1971 to 1983, Kirkby was married to conductor Andrew Parrott. Later, lutenist Anthony Rooley, with whom she had a child, became Kirkby's long-term partner. On 30 April 2015, she married conductor Howard Williams.

Kirkby is a co-president of the opera company Hampstead Garden Opera.
