= Christopher Page =

English musicologist and performer (born 1952)

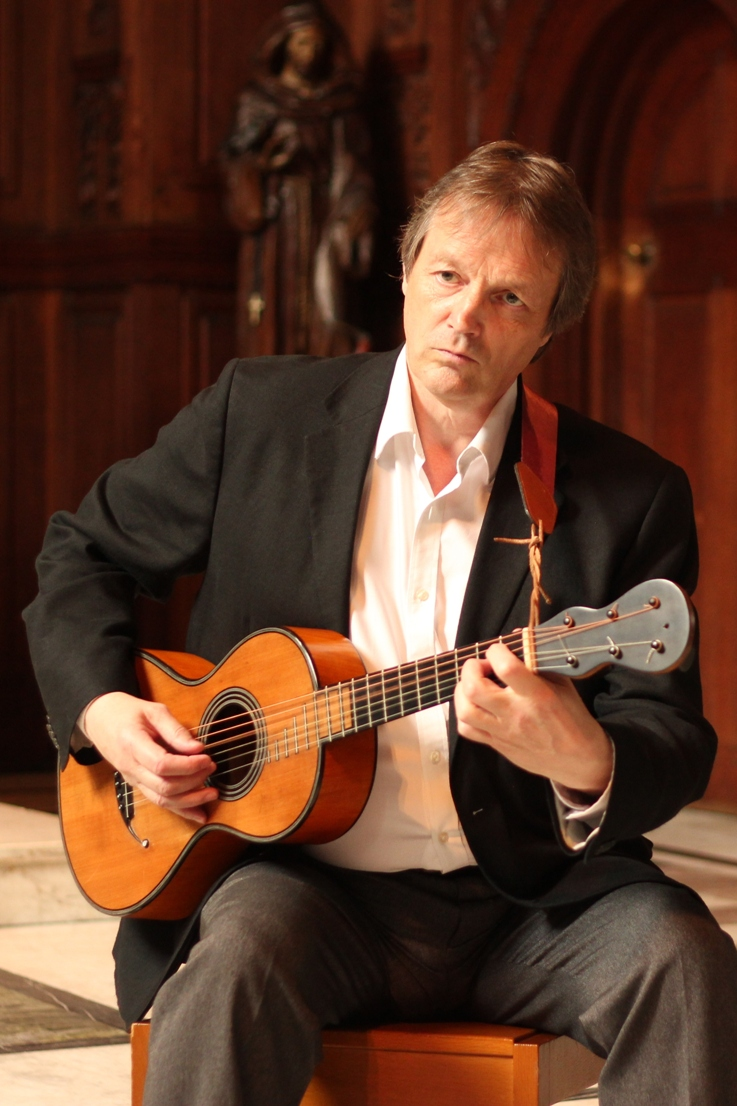
- Page performing in his role as Gresham Professor of Music
- Born: Christopher Howard Page; 8 April 1952 (age 74)
- Education: Balliol College, Oxford
- Occupations: Academic, writer, choral director and musicologist

Christopher Howard Page FBA FSA (born 8 April 1952) is an English musicologist and performer who specializes in medieval music and early English guitar history. He is currently a Fellow of Sidney Sussex College, Cambridge and Emeritus Professor of Medieval Music and Literature in the Faculty of English, University of Cambridge.

Page holds the Dent Medal of the Royal Musical Association awarded for outstanding services to musicology.

== Life and education ==
Christopher Howard Page was born on 8 April 1952 in London, England, UK. He was educated at Sir George Monoux Grammar School (founded 1527) in London and Balliol College, Oxford. He was awarded a PhD by the University of York in 1981. He was formerly a junior research fellow at Jesus College, Oxford (1977–1980) and senior research fellow in music at Sidney Sussex College, Cambridge.

== Career ==
Page is the founder and director of Gothic Voices, an early music vocal ensemble, which has recorded 25 discs for Hyperion Records, many winning awards. The group's 1982 recording of music by Hildegard of Bingen has been described as “one of the best-selling and most influential recordings of pre-classical music ever made” and credited with initiating "a craze for all things Hildegard". The ensemble has performed in many countries, including France, Germany, Portugal and Finland. London dates included twice-yearly sell-out concerts at London's Wigmore Hall. The ensemble gave its first BBC Promenade Concert in 1988. The group's work has been chronicled in Richard Taruskin, Text and Act (OUP, 2006) and Daniel Leech-Wilkinson, The Modern Invention of Medieval Music (CUP, 2007). According to Leech-Wilkinson, "It is no exaggeration to claim, and easy to show, that nothing since [Hugo] Riemann [1941–1919] has so much reshaped the performance and perception of medieval music as the work, and above all the recordings, of Gothic Voices. Giving concerts world-wide, and issuing on average one disc a year since 1983, Gothic Voices has, at the time of writing, set down over 300 pieces on 20 discs, stretching from Notre Dame conductus to late fifteenth-century masses – statistically a tiny proportion of the surviving repertory, but nonetheless a very substantial sample that adds up to an exceptionally large and representative survey of medieval music."

Between 1989 and 1997, he was presenter of BBC Radio 3's Early Music programme, Spirit of the Age, and a presenter of the Radio 4 arts programme Kaleidoscope. He has been chairman of the National Early Music Association and of the Plainsong and Medieval Music Society (founded 1889). He serves on the editorial boards of the journals Early Music (OUP) and Plainsong and Medieval Music (CUP).

Page was elected a Fellow of the Society of Antiquaries in 2008. He is a founder member of the Cambridge Consortium for Guitar Research, located at Sidney Sussex College. Page is a Fellow of the British Academy and Member of the Academia Europaea.

In 2014, he was appointed Professor of Music at Gresham College. In this role, he delivered four series of free public lectures within London.

Page plays historical guitars and the vihuela. His four-volume history of the guitar in England from the sixteenth century to the close of the nineteenth, published by Cambridge University Press (Volumes I, II and IV) and Yale University Press (III), has recently been completed. The set was described by Paul Sparks as 'surely the definitive four part history of the (pre-C20) guitar in England'.

In 2020, a Festschrift in his honour appeared, Music and Instruments of the Middle Ages. Essays in Honour of Christopher Page, edited by Tess Knighton and David Skinner (Woodbridge: The Boydell Press).

== Works ==
- Voices and Instruments of the Middle Ages. Instrumental Practice and Songs in France, 1100–1300 (London: Dent, 1987)
- The Owl and the Nightingale: Musical Life and Ideas in France 1100-1300 (London: Dent, 1989)
- The Summa Musice: A Thirteenth-Century Manual for Singers (1991)
- Discarding Images. Reflections on Music and Culture in Medieval France (Oxford: Clarendon Press & New York: Oxford University Press, 1993)
- Latin Poetry and Conductus Rhythm in Medieval France (London: Royal Musical Association, 1996)
- Music and Instruments of the Middle Ages. Studies on Texts and Performance (Aldershot: Variorum, 1997)
- Page, Christopher (2001). "Medieval". Grove Music Online. Oxford: Oxford University Press. doi:10.1093/gmo/9781561592630.article.18247. ISBN 978-1-56159-263-0. (subscription, Wikilibrary access, or UK public library membership required)
- The Christian West and Its Singers: The First Thousand Years (New Haven, CT: Yale University Press, 2010)
- The Guitar in Tudor England. A Social and Musical History (Cambridge: Cambridge University Press, 2015)
- The Guitar in Stuart England. A Social and Musical History (Cambridge: Cambridge University Press, 2017)
- The Guitar in Georgian England. A Social and Musical History (New Haven, CT: Yale University Press, 2020)
- ed., with Michael Fleming: Music and Instruments of the Elizabethan Age. The Eglantine Table (Woodbridge: The Boydell Press, 2021)
- ed., with Paul Sparks and James Westbrook: The Great Vogue for the Guitar in Western Europe, 1800–1840 (Woodbridge: The Boydell Press, 2023)
- The Guitar in Victorian England. A Social and Musical History (Cambridge: Cambridge University Press, 2025)
- Mozart and Beethoven arranged for guitar, flute and strings: newly discovered chamber repertoire from Victorian England, available from the digital repository of the University of Cambridge

Of Page's 2010 study, The Christian West and Its Singers: The First Thousand Years, Eamon Duffy wrote: "But once or twice in a generation a book comes along which crosses disciplinary boundaries to make unexpected connections, open up new imaginative vistas, and refocus what had seemed familiar historical landscapes. Page’s musician’s-eye view of the evolution of western Christendom is one of those books".

In 2017, The Guitar in Tudor England won the Nicholas Bessaraboff prize, awarded by the American Musical Instrument Society. The volume he edited with Paul Sparks and James Westbrook, The Great Vogue for the Guitar in Western Europe 1800-1840 was awarded the chitarra d’oro in the category ‘Musicology’ at the Convegno Internazionale di Chitarra, 2024, in Milan.
