= Catherine Cessac =

French musicologist and music publisher

Catherine Cessac (born 19 August 1952 in Bordeaux) is a French musicologist and music publisher.

== Biography ==
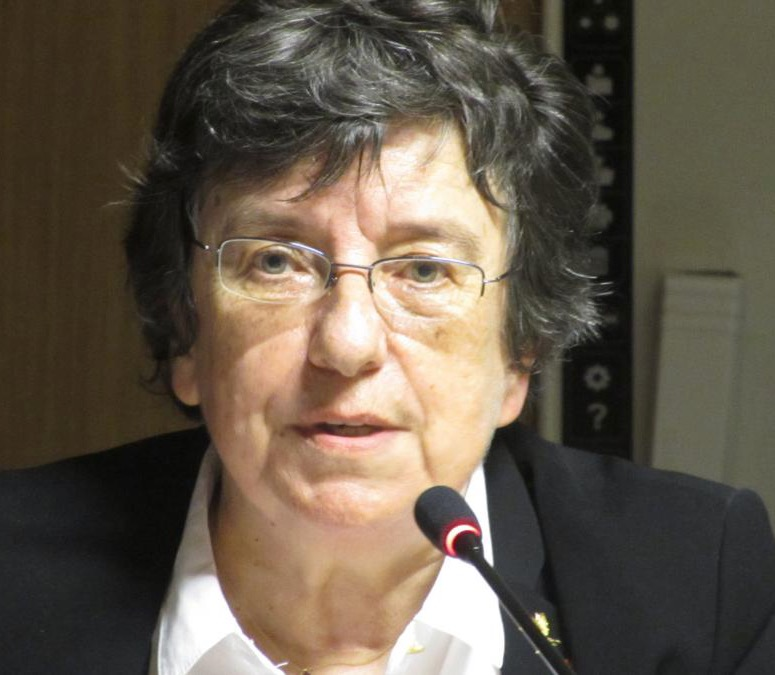
A picture of Catherine Cessac

Catherine Cessac studied at the University and the Conservatory of Bordeaux, and later studied musicology at the Sorbonne. From 1990 to 2003, she was the editor of the Bulletins of the "Société Marc-Antoine Charpentier". In 2004, she was commissioned by the French Ministry of Culture to organize national festivals for the 300th anniversary of the death of composer Marc-Antoine Charpentier, as well as the creation of a website by the CMBV, on the life and work of Charpentier. Catherine Cessac is a research director at the Centre national de la recherche scientifique (CNRS) and of the workshop of the Centre de musique baroque de Versailles (CMBV). French classical music of the seventeenth and eighteenth is the main field of her studies.

In 1988, her book Marc-Antoine Charpentier received the Académie Charles-Cros prize.

== Distinctions ==
- 1998: Chevalier de l'ordre des Arts et des Lettres
- 2005: Officier de l'ordre des Arts et des Lettres
- 2013: Prix des Muses in the Prix du patrimoine category, awarded by the "fondation Singer-Polignac" for Itinéraires d'André Campra
- 2011 : Chevalier de La Légion d'Honneur

== Publications ==
- 1988: Marc-Antoine Charpentier, second edition extended (Editions Fayard 2004)
- 1995: Élisabeth Jacquet de La Guerre, une femme compositeur sous le règne de Louis XIV (Actes Sud, Arles)
- 1998: Louis-Nicolas Clérambault (Fayard)
- 2003: L'Œuvre de Daniel Danielis (1635–1696), Catalogue thématique (CNRS Éditions)
- 2003: (avec Manuel Couvreur), La Duchesse du Maine (1676-1753). Une Mécène à la croisée des Arts et des Siècles, éditions Fabrice Prévat, Bruxelles, 2003
- 2004: Molière et la musique (Nouvelles Presses Du Languedoc)
- 2005: Marc-Antoine Charpentier - Un musicien retrouvé (Mardaga)
- 2007: Les manuscrits autographes de Marc-Antoine Charpentier (Mardaga)
- 2007: Jean-Féry Rebel, musicien des Éléments (Paris CNRS Éditions)
- 2012: Itinéraires d'André Campra
- 2016: Les Histoires sacrées de Marc-Antoine Charpentier, Brepols
- 2026: La duchesse du Maine (1676-1753). Entre rêve politique et réalité poétique, Paris, Classiques Garnier, « L’Europe des Lumières », 2016.
- 2019: Monumentale Marc-Antoine Charpentier, Musique pour les comédies de Molière, édition scientifique, (CMBV)
- 2019: Les Caprices de Ludovise. Un décor retrouvé de l’ancien château de Sceaux (en collaboration avec Dominique Brême), Milan, Silvana Editoriale.
- 2021: Duchesse du Maine, Antoine Houdar de La Motte, Mme de Lambert et Rose de Staal-Delaunay, Lettres, Paris, Classiques Garnier.
