= Taverner Consort and Players =

British music ensemble

The Taverner Choir, Consort and Players
- Baroque orchestra and vocal ensemble
- The Taverner Choir, Consort and Players emblem
- Founded: 1973
- Principal conductor: Andrew Parrott
- Website: www.taverner.org

The Taverner Choir, Consort and Players is a British music ensemble which specialises in the performance of Early and Baroque music. The ensemble is made up of a Baroque orchestra (the Players), a vocal consort (the Consort) and a Choir. Performers place emphasis on a historically informed performance practice and players work with restored or replicated period instruments.

The group is named after the 16th-century English composer John Taverner.

== History ==
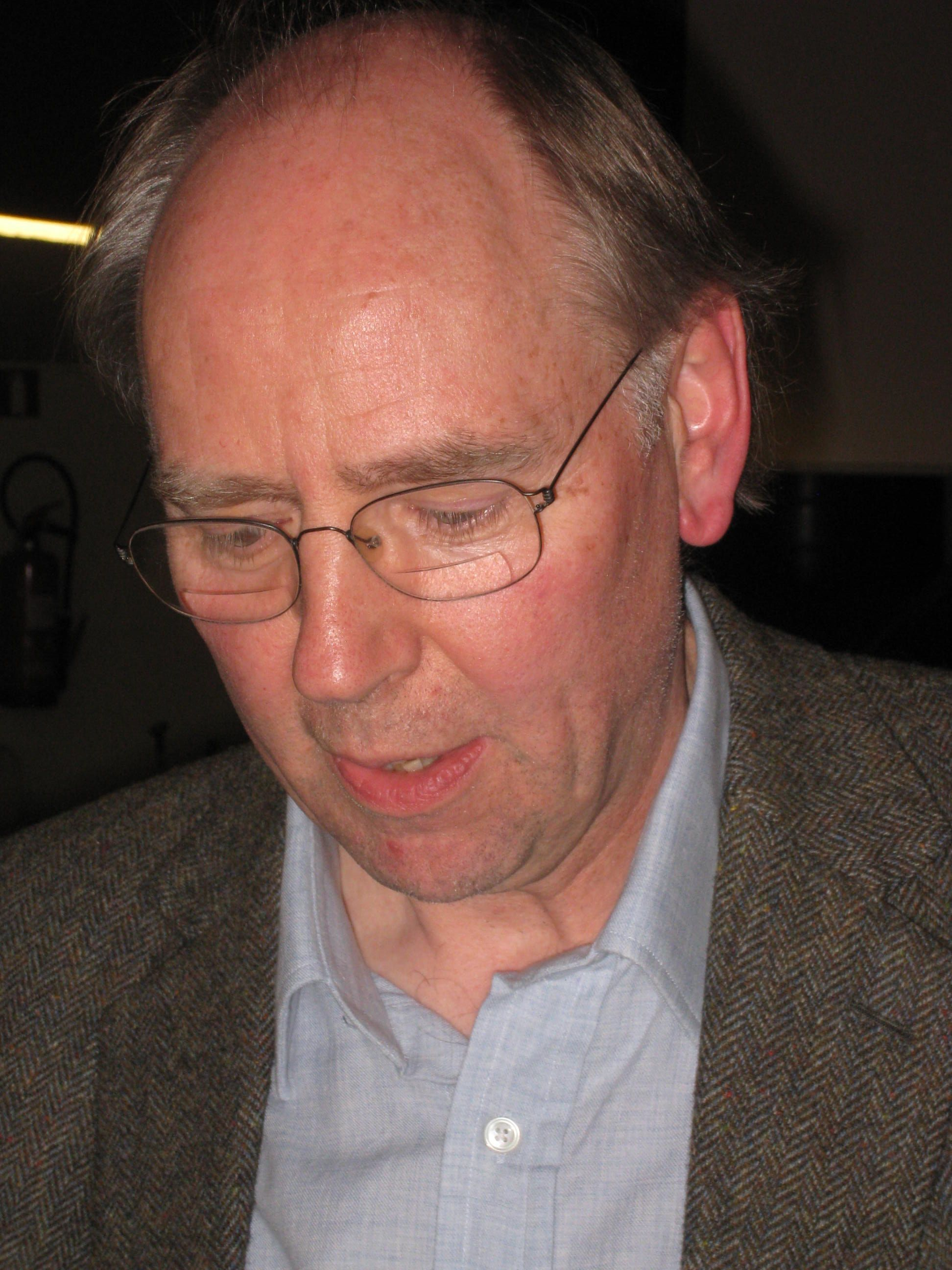
Founder Andrew Parrott

In 1973 the Taverner Choir, Consort and Players (TCCP) made their début at the Bath International Music Festival. The group was founded by Andrew Parrott at the suggestion of composer Sir Michael Tippett. Parrott had a keen interest in the "golden age of polyphony", the era of English Renaissance music, and formed a specialist choir along with a chamber ensemble and a Renaissance or Baroque orchestra, devoted to authentic performance of European classical music from the 15th-17th centuries.

Parrott's group was formed during the flourishing of the British Early music revival during the 1970s, when orchestras and choirs such as Christopher Hogwood's Academy of Ancient Music, The English Concert under Trevor Pinnock and The Tallis Scholars under Peter Phillips began to emerge, advancing the performance of early Western art music informed by scholarly research and using period instruments.

The Taverner Consort and Players were led until the early 1990s by baroque violinist John Holloway. The ensemble has collaborated with noted early music practitioners such as singers Emma Kirkby, Emily Van Evera, Evelyn Tubb, Rogers Covey-Crump, and instrumentalists Nigel North, Francis Baines and Anthony Bailes. The players' orchestral make-up typically includes instruments such as baroque violins, viols, lutes, theorbo and chamber organ continuo.

== Awards ==
The ensemble's recording of John Taverner's Western Wind Mass won the 2016 Early Music Award at the Gramophone Classical Music Awards. and received the Diapason d'Or in 2017.

== Notable recordings ==
TCCP have an extensive catalogue of over 60 critically acclaimed recordings featuring works by composers such as Johann Sebastian Bach, Claudio Monteverdi, Guillaume de Machaut and Giovanni Gabrieli. The ensemble also premièred of Parrott's own reconstruction of Bach's lost work, Trauermusik for Prince Leopold. Many recordings made in the 1980s were originally released on the EMI Reflexe label, and later recordings and re-issues on Virgin Veritas, Erato Records and Avie Records.

- Monteverdi – Vespro della Beata Vergine (EMI Reflexe, 1983)
- Claudio Monteverdi — Selva Morale e Spirituale (EMI Reflexe, 1984)
- J S Bach – Mass in B minor (EMI Reflexe, 1985)
- Taverner — Missa Gloria tibi Trinitas a6 (EMI Reflexe, 1986)
- Tallis — Latin Church Music (EMI Reflexe, 1989)
- Giovanni Gabrieli – Canzonas, Sontatas, Motets (EMI Reflexe, 1992)
- J S Bach — St John Passion (Virgin Veritas, 1991)
- Trauer-Music for Prince Leopold (Avie, 2011)
- Claudio Monteverdi — L’Orfeo: Favola in musica (Avie, 2013) and
- Western Wind Mass by John Taverner & Court Music for Henry VIII (Avie, 2016)

== See also ==
- List of early music ensembles
- Early music of the British Isles
- Music of Venice
