= Howard Milner =

British singer (1953–2011)

- Born: Howard Milner; 24 February 1953
- Died: 6 March 2011 (aged 58); London
- Education: Monkton Combe School
- Alma mater: Cambridge; Guildhall School of Music and Drama

Howard Milner (23 February 1953 – 6 March 2011) was a British tenor. He began his musical education as a chorister at Coventry Cathedral. He then won a music scholarship to Monkton Combe School, read English at Cambridge University followed by post graduate at the Guildhall School of Music and Drama.

== Singing career ==
Milner's first professional engagement was with Swingle II, the jazz based vocal octet, followed by several years in Paris with the Group Vocal de France specialising in contemporary music. On his return to London he worked with many different vocal groups, sang in the West End and worked in the commercial session scene.

A serious motor bike accident in 1982 prompted Milner to decide to take his singing more seriously.

He returned to the Guildhall School with a scholarship to the Opera course where he subsequently won several major prizes. An invitation to join the Glyndebourne company followed. Contracts with Scottish Opera, Kent Opera, English National Opera and the Royal Opera House followed, after which his career became international. During this time he was also a regular member of the experimental and edgy Opera Factory with David Freeman. Alongside his operatic work, he was known as an accomplished concert singer of international standing. He was invited to perform at the Amsterdam Concertgebouw with Ton Koopmman with whom he later toured the Far East, with a live recording on Japanese TV. He also sang at the Carnegie Hall in New York, Sydney Opera House, with Chicago Symphony Orchestra and the BBC Proms at the Royal Albert Hall. Amongst his many recordings from this time are Monteverdi's Orfeo and Bach's B Minor Mass with John Eliot Gardiner, the award-winning album of Hildegard of Bingen with Gothic Voices which pioneered the rebirth of interest in her work, and Benjamin Britten's Billy Budd with the ENO, now available on DVD.

== Reviews ==
"Howard Milner offered a brilliant comic arnalta whilst the rest of the cast gave strong support"

"The singing of the tenor role of narrator by Howard Milner was beyond all praise"

For The Marriage of Figaro "Howard Milner gave a vividly menacing portrayal of Basilio, exceedingly well sung"

For Benjamin Britten's Magic Flute "Howard Milners’s diminutive, floundering Flute was an absolute delight.

“Chelsea Opera Group chose to cast a young tenor as the Bulgarian whom Bizet imagined as a soprano role, only there for lyrical relief. However, Howard Milners’s fresh appealing timbre wholly justified the choice"

For The Coronation of Poppaea at Queen Elizabeth Hall, Southbank Festival "It was left to Howard Milner’s brilliantly played tenor (in Arrata) to brush the event in greasepaint with a richly comic impersonation of Poppaea’s nursemaid"

== Teaching and writing ==
In 1994, Milner was appointed Professor of Singing at the Birmingham Conservatoire where he remained until 1997 when he was invited to teach at the Royal Academy of Music in London. He remained there until he was forced to retire due to ill health in 2011. Milner also taught privately at his home in London. His international reputation meant that students travelled from all over the world to work with him.

During the last 10 years of his life, Milner developed and began to write about his own ideas on the teaching of singing. He published numerous articles, and presented the paper "Language Feelings and the Unconscious in Learning to Sing" at the 2010 International Conference of the Voice in London.

== Awards ==
Howard was made a Fellow of the Royal Academy of Music in 2011.
