= Hyperion Records =

British classical record label

- Parent company: Universal Music Group
- Founded: 1980
- Founder: George Edward Perry
- Genre: Classical music
- Country of origin: United Kingdom
- Location: United Kingdom
- Official website: hyperion-records.co.uk

Hyperion Records is a British classical music record label. Established in 1980, Hyperion was an independent label until February 2023, when it was acquired by the Universal Music Group; it now operates as one of Universal's three classical record labels, alongside Decca and Deutsche Grammophon.

== History ==
Ted Perry founded Hyperion in 1980, with assistance from his then-wife Doreen and business partner Bill Harper, naming the company after Hyperion, one of the Titans of Greek mythology. Early LP releases include rarely recorded 20th-century British music by composers such as Robin Milford, Alan Bush and Michael Berkeley. The company's fortunes greatly improved following the release of a critically acclaimed and popular disc of music by Hildegard of Bingen, A Feather on the Breath of God (1985), directed by the medievalist Christopher Page and his group Gothic Voices, and the album 'Sacred Vocal Music of Monteverdi'.

After the death on 9 February 2003 of Ted Perry, his son Simon Perry took over as director.

=== Sawkins lawsuit ===
In 2004, Hyperion became embroiled in a legal dispute with Lionel Sawkins, a music editor whose editions of works by Michel-Richard de Lalande had been used in Hyperion's recording of the composer's music. Sawkins sued the company for royalties accruing from his musical copyright in these editions.

Hyperion maintained that the editions were not original compositions and therefore were not subject to copyright, and further that Sawkins did receive payment in the form of a hire fee from the performers for their rental. The case came to court in May 2004, and the judgment went largely in Sawkins's favour. Hyperion appealed in March 2005, and the court upheld the original judgment.

While the damages Sawkins sought were thought to be small, the legal costs of the case were estimated to result in a liability to the company of hundreds of thousands of pounds sterling, making its future uncertain at the time. By 2006, Hyperion had received financial support from musicians, consumers, and composers to enable its survival. Many musicologists criticized this precedent-setting case, including Peter Phillips, the director of the Tallis Scholars and himself a music editor, who said:

"All the music I perform has to be edited, or we couldn't read it. But copyright should be there to reward creativity, not scholarship or diligence. How much an editor did or did not write should never be asked and judged during a million-pound lawsuit involving a small and innovative recording company."

Following the death of Sawkins in September 2025, Hyperion has restored this recording to download and CDR availability.

=== Acquisition by Universal Music Group ===
Entries at Companies House show that, on 14 February 2023, ownership of Hyperion moved to Universal Music Operations Limited, the British subsidiary of Universal Music Group (UMG), which later officially announced the acquisition on 15 March 2023, making Hyperion a sister label of Deutsche Grammophon and Decca. In 2023, Universal announced plans for the first-ever streaming availability of Hyperion recordings in the history of the Hyperion brand. With the absorption of Hyperion into Universal Music, Simon Perry remains as managing director of Hyperion.

== Recognition ==
Hyperion has particularly focused on recording lesser-known works, particularly Romantic piano concertos that had fallen from the repertory, works by Scottish Romantic composers, and English music of the Renaissance to the Baroque. They are especially known for their series of recordings of Franz Liszt's complete music for solo piano recorded by Leslie Howard, their complete edition of Franz Schubert's lieder prepared under the supervision of Graham Johnson and many of Handel's oratorios and Henry Purcell's choral works under the direction of Robert King.

More recently, Stephen Hough recorded Rachmaninov's complete piano concertos and the Paganini Rhapsody using the composer's original score. Hyperion is also noted for the breadth of its recorded repertoire, including music from the 12th to the 21st centuries. The label is renowned for complete recordings of lieder by Carl Loewe, Robert Schumann, Felix Mendelssohn, Richard Strauss, and Franz Liszt. More recently, Hyperion launched the Romantic violin concerto and Romantic cello concerto series.

Canadian pianist Angela Hewitt OBE recorded a complete cycle of Bach's keyboard works for the label (including the Well-Tempered Clavier twice over), while Christopher Herrick recorded his complete organ works.

Hyperion's recordings have won many awards, among them several Gramophone Awards, including Record of the Year in 1996, 1998, 2002, and 2010. Ted Perry was voted into the Gramophone Hall of Fame in April 2012.

== See also ==
- Lists of record labels
- List of independent UK record labels
