= Predrag Gosta =

Serbian-American conductor, harpsichordist, and baritone

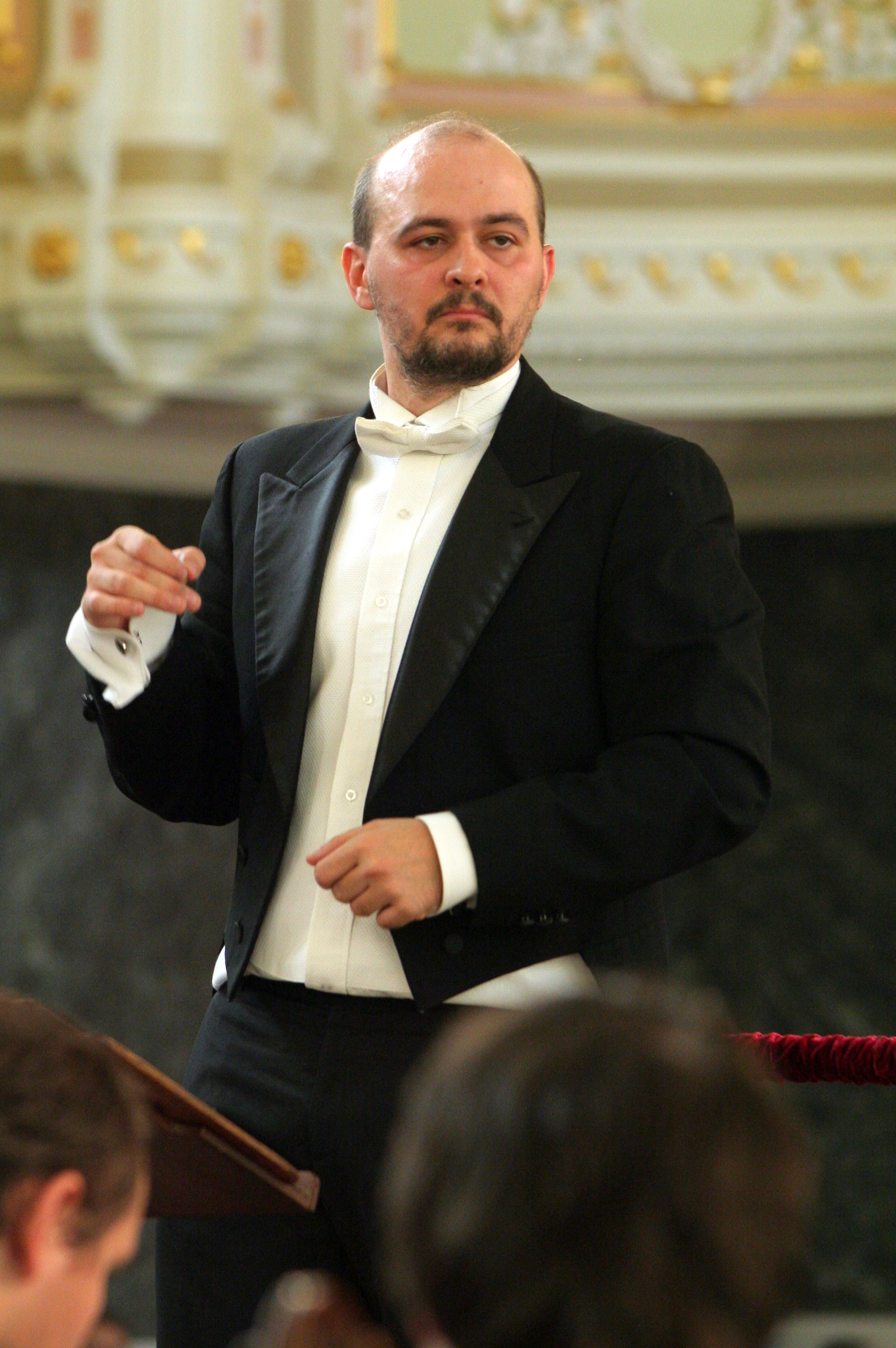
- Gosta conducting the St. Petersburg State Academic Capella in 2010
- Born: Predrag Gosta; Belgrade, Yugoslavia (Serbia)
- Occupations: Conductor, harpsichordist & baritone
- Years active: 1993–present
- Website: predraggosta.com

Predrag Gosta (Cyrillic: Предраг Госта) is a Serbian-American conductor, harpsichordist, and baritone.

== Life and career ==
Predrag Gosta was born in Belgrade, Yugoslavia (present day Serbia), on 14 January 1972. His father was born to Serbian and German parents in Vojvodina and his mother to a large Croatian family in Herzegovina.

He studied at the Belgrade Music Academy, London's Trinity College of Music, Georgia State University in Atlanta (USA), as well as the University of Oxford.

He is the artistic director of an early music ensemble and baroque orchestra New Trinity Baroque, and the music director and conductor of the Gwinnett Ballet Theatre based in Atlanta, United States; the president of the international early music society Early Music Network. From 1991 to 1996 he was the artistic director of the Studio for Early Music Belgrade and the Belgrade International Early Music Festival. Since the festival's renewal in 2012 Maestro Gosta has been serving again as its artistic director. The Festival has since grown to one of the largest and most successful early music festivals in southern Europe - in 2017 it received an Award from the classical music magazine Muzika klasika as the best festival for classical music in Serbia, while Maestro Gosta received the Artist of the Year award from the Association of Musical Artists. Predrag Gosta is also the artistic director of the Belgrade Baroque Academy, which he founded in 2013 and co-directed until 2019 with Serbian-born contralto Marijana Mijanović.

Between 2008 and 2009 he was the assistant conductor of the National Philharmonic in Washington, D.C. Since 2010 he is the president of the Makris Foundation in Washington, D.C., and the Makris Music Society. He is also an artistic advisor and U.S. director of Peter the Great Music Academy in St. Petersburg, Russia. In 2014 Gosta established the New Belgrade Opera, which is focused on baroque opera. In 2015 he became the music director of the New Symphony Orchestra of Belgrade, which now bears the name of the Greek-American composer Andreas Makris and is now known as the Makris Symphony Orchestra. In 2019, under this orchestra, he founded a new international competition for conductors, where he acts as the president of the jury.

Predrag Gosta has recorded several critically acclaimed CDs, including recording of Henry Purcell's opera Dido and Aeneas with British soprano Evelyn Tubb, and recording of Rachmaninoff's Symphonic Dances and Mussorgsky's Pictures at an Exhibition with the London Symphony Orchestra. Other musicians he collaborated with include baroque violinists Florian Deuter, Ilia Korol and John Holloway, Baroque harpist Andrew Lawrence-King, lutenists Anthony Rooley and Michael Fields, Dutch recorder virtuoso Marion Verbruggen, harpsichordists Steven Devine and Ottaviano Tenerani, Italian countertenor Carlo Vistoli, Serbian contralto Marijana Mijanovic, Polish mezzo-soprano Magdalena Wór and others, as well as orchestras and theatre houses such as the London Symphony Orchestra, the Russian National Orchestra in Moscow, the State Hermitage Orchestra in St. Petersburg, the St. Petersburg State Capella Glinka, the Belgrade Philharmonic Orchestra, the Theatre of Biel-Solothurn Theatre, the Belgrade National Theatre and the Madlenianum Opera-Theatre, opera theatres in Ruse, Burgas and Stara Zagora (Bulgaria) and others. He appeared at the festivals such as the Boston Early Music Festival and Piccolo Spoleto (USA), Varazdin Baroque Evenings and Korkyra Baroque (Croatia), Budva Theatre City (Montenegro) and many others.

Predrag Gosta also served the affiliate guest lecturer at Georgia State University in Atlanta, and as a choir professor and artist-in-residence at Oxford College of Emory University in Oxford, Georgia, USA.

== Discography and videography ==
Album	Orchestra/Ensemble	Soloist(s)	Label	Release year
Telemann: Pimpinone	New Trinity Baroque, New Belgrade Opera, et al.	Sreten Manojlović, Radoslava Vorgić	forthcoming	2025
Handel: Acis and Galatea	New Trinity Baroque, New Belgrade Opera, et al.	Leif Aruhn-Solén, Beatriz de Sousa, Mathias Hedegaard, Sreten Manojlović, et al.	forthcoming	2024
Monteverdi: L'Orfeo	New Trinity Baroque, La Pifarescha, New Belgrade Opera, et al.	Nikola Diskić, Antonia Dunjko, Radoslava Vorgić, Marko Špehar, Dragana Popović, Marko Živković, Ljubomir Popović, et al.	forthcoming	2024
J.S. Bach: Early Cantatas (BWV 4, 61, 150 and 196)	New Trinity Baroque	Wanda Yang Temko, Carrie Cheron, Leif Aruhn-Solén, Paul Max Tipton	forthcoming	2024
W.A. Mozart: Requiem	Makris Symphony Orchestra	Ana-Marija Brkić, Dragana Popović, Roberto Jachini Virgili, Sreten Manojlović	forthcoming	2024
Handel: Orlando	Baroque Orchestra of the New Belgrade Opera	Bojan Bulatović, Sreten Manojlović, Ana-Marija Brkić, Radoslava Vorgić, Dragana Popović	forthcoming	2022
Slavic Spirit (Music by Mussorgsky, Smetana, Tchaikovsky and Borodin)	Makris Symphony Orchestra		Edition Lilac	2021
W.A. Mozart: Concertos for Piano and Violin	Makris Symphony Orchestra	Nataša Veljković, Milica Zulus	Edition Lilac	2020
Purcell: Dido and Aeneas (15th Anniversary Edition)	New Trinity Baroque	Evelyn Tubb, Thomas Meglioranza, et al	Edition Lilac	2019
Buxtehude: Membra Jesu Nostri	New Trinity Baroque	Radoslava Vorgić, Dragana Popović, Bojan Bulatović, Marko Živković, Sreten Manojlović	Edition Lilac	2018
Monteverdi: L'Orfeo	Baroque Orchestra of the New Belgrade Opera	Nikola Diskić, Antonia Dunjko, Radoslava Vorgić, Marko Špehar, Dragana Popović, Marko Živković, Ljubomir Popović, et al.	OperaVision	2017
Predrag Gosta and London Symphony Orchestra: Orchestral Highlights (Music by Mussorgsky, Rachmaninov and Makris)	London Symphony Orchestra	Tomo Keller, Andrew Marriner, et al.	Edition Lilac	2016
J.S. Bach: Violin Concertos	New Trinity Baroque	Carrie Krause, Adriane Post	Edition Lilac	2016
Mussorgsky (orch. Ravel): Pictures at an Exhibition / Rachmaninov: Symphonic Dances	London Symphony Orchestra	Tomo Keller, et al.	Edition Lilac	2016
Makris: Orchestral Works	London Symphony Orchestra	Andrew Marriner, et al.	Edition Lilac	2015
Baroque Christmas (Concertos and Cantatas by Corelli, Torelli, Manfredini, Scarlatti, Buxtehude and Bernhard)	New Trinity Baroque	Kathryn Mueller, Wanda Yang Temko, Adriane Post, Carrie Krause, Martha Perry, Anna Griffis, André Laurent O'Neil	Edition Lilac	2011
Vivaldi: Concertos	New Trinity Baroque	Carrie Krause, Daniela Giulia Pierson, Michael Fields, André Laurent O'Neil, Christina Babich Rosser	Edition Lilac	2010
Handel: Arias	New Trinity Baroque	Leif Aruhn-Solén	Edition Lilac	2010
Pergolesi: Stabat Mater	New Trinity Baroque	Evelyn Tubb, Terry Barber	Edition Lilac	2008
Carissimi: Oratorios Jonas and Jephte	New Trinity Baroque, Oxford Chorale	Julia Matthews, Kevin Sutton	Edition Lilac	2007
Charpentier: Messe de minuit / Handel: Organ Concertos	New Trinity Baroque, Canterbury Choir	Brad Hughley, Elizabeth Packard Arnold, Magdalena Wór, Brent Runnels, Patrick Newell	Edition Lilac	2005
Purcell: Dido and Aeneas	New Trinity Baroque	Evelyn Tubb, Thomas Meglioranza, Julia Matthews, Elizabeth Packard Arnold, Allison A. Brown, Terry Barber, Kevin Sutton, Brad Fugate	Edition Lilac	2004
Trio Sonatas & Chaconnas	New Trinity Baroque		EMN	2003
Il Pastor Fido (Balli e Balletti by Monteverdi and Marini)	Ensemble of the Studio for Early Music Belgrade	Gordana Kostic, Predrag Djokovic, Nenad Ristovic, Predrag Gosta, et al.	STURAM	1996
