= Stabat Mater (Pergolesi) =

1736 composition by Giovanni Battista Pergolesi

- by Giovanni Battista Pergolesi
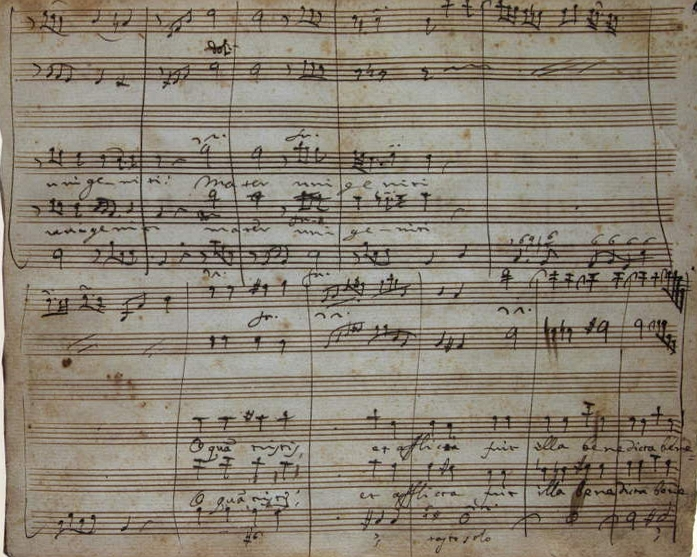
- Autograph from the third movement
- Catalogue: P. 77
- Text: Stabat Mater
- Language: Latin
- Composed: 1736
- Movements: 12
- Vocal: soprano and alto soloists
- Instrumental: strings; basso continuo

Stabat Mater (P.77) is a musical setting of the Stabat Mater sequence, composed by Giovanni Battista Pergolesi in 1736. Composed in the final weeks of Pergolesi's life, it is scored for soprano and alto soloists, violin I and II, viola and basso continuo.

The autograph manuscript of the work is preserved in the Benedictine Abbey of Monte Cassino.

== Background ==
Many pieces which were said to have been composed by Pergolesi have been misattributed; the Stabat Mater is definitely by Pergolesi, as a manuscript in his handwriting has been preserved. The work was composed for a Neapolitan confraternity, the Cavalieri della Vergine dei Dolori di San Luigi al Palazzo, which had also commissioned a Stabat Mater from Alessandro Scarlatti. Pergolesi composed it during his final illness from tuberculosis in a Franciscan monastery in Pozzuoli, along with a Salve Regina setting, and finished it shortly before he died.

== Reception ==
The Stabat Mater is one of Pergolesi's most celebrated sacred works, achieving great popularity after the composer's death. Jean-Jacques Rousseau showed appreciation for the work, praising the opening movement as "the most perfect and touching duet to come from the pen of any composer". Many composers adapted the work, including Giovanni Paisiello, who extended the orchestral accompaniment, and Joseph Eybler, who added a choir to replace some of the duets. Bach's Tilge, Höchster, meine Sünden is a parody cantata based on Pergolesi's composition.

The work was not without its detractors. Padre Martini criticised its light, operatic style in 1774, and believed it was too similar to Pergolesi's comic opera La serva padrona to adequately deliver the pathos of the text.

== Structure ==
The work is divided into twelve movements, each named after the incipit of the text. Much of the music is based on Pergolesi's earlier setting of the Dies irae sequence.

1. "Stabat Mater Dolorosa", Grave, F minor, common time; duet
2. "Cujus animam gementem", Andante amoroso, C minor, 3/8; soprano aria
3. "O quam tristis et afflicta", Larghetto, G minor, common time; duet
4. "Quae moerebat et dolebat", Allegro, E♭ major, 2/4; alto aria
5. "Quis est homo", Largo, C minor, common time; duet
  —"Pro peccatis suae gentis", Allegro, C minor, 6/8
6. "Vidit suum dulcem natum", Tempo giusto, F minor, common time; soprano aria
7. "Eja mater fons amoris", Andantino, C minor, 3/8; alto aria
8. "Fac ut ardeat cor meum", Allegro, G minor, cut common time; duet
9. "Sancta mater, istud agas", Tempo giusto, E♭ major, common time; duet
10. "Fac ut portem Christi mortem", Largo, G minor, common time; alto aria
11. "Inflammatus et accensus", Allegro ma non troppo, B♭ major, common time; duet
12. "Quando corpus morietur", Largo assai, F minor, common time; duet
  —"Amen..." Presto assai, F minor, cut common time

== Recordings ==
Release year	Soloists	Conductor	Orchestra	Label	Catalog Number
1935	Ina Souez Rose Bampton	Leopold Stokowski	Philadelphia Orchestra	His Master's Voice	DB 2704
1949 (excerpts recorded 1939)	Hans Schneider Hans Frank, Erich Kuchar	Victor Gomboz		History	205207
1947	Joan Taylor Kathleen Ferrier	Roy Henderson	The Boyd Neel Orchestra	Decca	AK1517 - AK1521
1951	Anna Maria Augenstein Hetty Plümacher	Hans Grischkat	Ton-Studio Orchestra of Stuttgart	Nixa	530
1953	Victoria de los Ángeles Oralia Domínguez	Arturo Toscanini	NBC Symphony Orchestra	RCA Victor	GD60272
1955	Teresa Stich-Randall Elisabeth Höngen	Mario Rossi	Vienna State Opera Orchestra	Bach Guild	549
1956	Friederike Sailer Hanne Münch	Günter Kehr	Mainzer Kammerorchester	Vox	9960
1958	Margot Guilleaume Jeanne Deroubaiz	Matthieu Lange	Südwestdeutsches Kammerorchester	Archiv	14098
1965	Judith Raskin Maureen Lehane	Franco Caracciolo	Orchestra Rossini di Napoli	Decca	6153
1966	Evelyn Lear Christa Ludwig	Lorin Maazel	Berlin Radio Symphony Orchestra	Phillips	3590
1990 (live 1968 performance)	Gundula Janowitz Maureen Forrester	Claudio Abbado	Berlin Philharmonic	Myto	905.25
1969	Margaret Tynes Anita Turner-Butler	Massimo Bruni	Prague Chamber Orchestra	Supraphon	1112 0620
1972	Luciana Ticinelli-Fattori Maria Minetto	Edwin Loehrer	Società Cameristica di Lugano	Erato	55046
1973	Mirella Freni Teresa Berganza	Ettore Gracis	Solisti Dell'Orchestra "Scarlatti" Napoli	Archiv	2533 114
1973	Ingeborg Müller-Ney Tuula Nienstedt		Heidelberger Kammerorchester	Sastruphon	SM 007047
1979	Margaret Marshall Alfreda Hodgson	Günter Kehr	Mainzer Kammerorchester	Candide	31118
1979	Klaus Brettschneider, Stefan Frangoulis Christian Siferlinger, Michael Stumpf	Gerhard Schmidt-Gaden	English Baroque Ensemble	Philips	6501 011
1979	Ileana Cotrubas Lucia Valentini-Terrani	Claudio Scimone	I Solisti Veneti	Erato	71179
1980	Felicity Palmer Alfreda Hodgson	George Guest	Argo Chamber Orchestra	Argo	591023
1981	Magda Kalmar Julia Hamari	Lamberto Gardelli	Liszt Ferenc Chamber Orchestra, Budapest	Hungaroton	12201-2
1983	Sebastian Hennig René Jacobs	René Jacobs	Concerto Vocale	Harmonia Mundi	1119
1985	Margaret Marshall Lucia Valentini-Terrani	Claudio Abbado	London Symphony Orchestra	Deutsche Grammophon	415103
1986	Kiri Te Kanawa Agnes Baltsa	Leonard Slatkin	St. Louis Symphony Orchestra	RCA Red Seal	RCD1-5194
1987	Mieke van der Sluis Gérard Lesne	René Clemencic	Clemencic Consort	Accord	200062
1987	Véronique Dietschy Alain Zaepffel	Paul Colleaux	Ensemble Stradivaria	Adda	581016
1988	Gillian Fisher Michael Chance	Robert King	The King's Consort	Hyperion	66294
1989	Emma Kirkby James Bowman	Christopher Hogwood	Academy of Ancient Music	Decca	425 692-2
1990	Krisztina Laki Julia Hamari	Agostino Orizio	Orchestra da Camera del Festival Internazionale di Brescia e Bergamo	Fonè	90 F 03
1991	Mária Zádori Derek Lee Ragin	Pál Németh	Capella Savaria	harmonia mundi	3903011
2000 (recorded 1993)	Cecilia Gasdia Delores Ziegler	Claudio Scimone	I Solisti Veneti	Warner	8573-81276
1993	June Anderson Cecilia Bartoli	Charles Dutoit	Montreal Sinfonietta	Decca	436209
1993	Dennis Naseband Jochen Kowalski	Hartmut Haenchen	Carl Philipp Emanuel Bach Chamber Orchestra	Berlin Classics	115112
1994	Dorothea Röschmann Catherine Robbin	Bernard Labadie	Les Violons du Roy	Sono Luminus	90196
1995	Arthur Stefanowics Brigitte Fournier	Andrzej Mysinski	Concerto Avenna	Elysium	705
1995	Anna Gonda Julia Faulkner	Michael Halász	Camerata Budapest	Naxos	8550766
1995	Regina Klepper Martina Borst		Bamberg String Quartet	Capriccio Records	10517
1996	Katia Ricciarelli Manuela Custer	Giorgio Croci	I Filarmonici	Tactus	711602
1998	Gemma Bertagnolli Sara Mingardo	Rinaldo Alessandrini	Concerto Italiano	Opus 111 / Naïve	Opus 111 – OPS 30-160
1998	Evelyn Lear Christa Ludwig	Lorin Maazel	Berlin Radio Symphony Orchestra	Philips	462054
1999	Barbara Bonney Andreas Scholl	Christophe Rousset	Les Talens Lyriques	Decca	466134
2000	Véronique Gens Gérard Lesne	Gérard Lesne	Seminario Musicale	Virgin Classics	45291
2004	Pino De Vittorio Patrizia Bovi	Olivier Schneebeli	Le Poème Harmonique	Alpha Productions	9
2004	Roberta Invernizzi, soprano Sonia Prina, contralto	Ottavio Dantone	Accademia Bizantina	Paragon per Amadeus	AM 180-2
2006	Michael Chance Jörg Waschinski	Helmut Müller-Brühl	Cologne Chamber Orchestra	Naxos	8557447
2006	Bettina Rubertone Chiarastella Onorati	Flavio Emilio Scogna	Benedetto Marcello Chamber Orchestra	Tactus	711603
2006	Dorothea Röschmann David Daniels	Fabio Biondi	Europa Galante	Emi Classics	63340
2008	Mikael Bellini Susanne Rydén		Stockholm Baroque Orchestra	Proprius-audiosource	2040
2009	Elisabeth Norberg-Schulz Nathalie Stutzmann	Roy Goodman	Hanover Band	RCA	61215
2009	Katia Ricciarelli Lucia Valentini-Terrani	Claudio Abbado	Milan Teatro alla Scala Orchestra	Euroarts	2072378
2009	Barbara Hendricks Ulrika Tenstam		Drottningholm Baroque Ensemble	Arte Verum	7
2009	Lawrence Zazzo Angharad Gruffydd Jones	Timothy Brown	Cambridge Ensemble	Brilliant Classics	93952
2010	Anna Prohaska Bernarda Fink	Bernhard Forck	Academy for Ancient Music Berlin	Harmonie Mundi	902072
2010	Rachel Harnisch Sara Mingado	Claudio Abbado	Orchestra Mozart	Archiv	477 8077
2010	Elin Manahan Thomas Robin Blaze	Ashley Solomon	Florilegium	Channel Classics	CCS SA 29810
2011	Anna Netrebko Marianna Pizzolato	Antonio Pappano	Santa Cecilia Academy Rome Orchestra	Deutsche Grammophon	001544402
2012	Valer Sabadus Terry Wey	Michael Hofstetter	Neumeyer Consort	Oehms	831
2013	Philippe Jaroussky Julia Lezhneva	Diego Fasolis	I Barocchisti	Erato	19147
2014	Jonah Schenkel Alex Potter	Alphons von Aarburg	Barockorchester Capriccio	Tudor Records	7166
2015	Evelyn Tubb Terry Barber	Predrag Gosta	New Trinity Baroque	Edition Lilac	151108
2016	Sara Mingardo Silvia Frigato	Federico Ferri	Accademia degli Astrusi	Concerto	2097
2017	Tim Mead Lucy Crowe	David Bates	La Nuova Musica	Harmonia Mundi	907589
2019	Magali Léger Paulin Bündgen	Jean-Marc Andrieu	Les Passions	Liga	327912
2019	Mariella Devia Francesca Provvisionato	Daniele Callegari	Orchestra Filarmonica Marchigiana	Fonè	130
2020	Sandrine Piau Christopher Lowrey	Christophe Rousset	Les Talens Lyriques	Alpha Productions	449
2021	Samuel Mariño Filippo Mineccia	Marie Van Rhijn	Orchestre de l'Opéra Royal	Château de Versailles Spectacles	033
