= New Trinity Baroque =

- Orchestra
- Founded: 1998
- Music director: Predrag Gosta
- Website: www.newtrinitybaroque.org

New Trinity Baroque is an ensemble and orchestra with an associated chamber choir, specialised in baroque music played on period instruments. It was founded in 1998 in London where it is currently based, although it was for many years based in Atlanta, United States. It is led by harpsichordist and conductor Predrag Gosta.

The orchestra has worked with guest artists such as flutist Rachel Brown, recorder players Marion Verbruggen and Emma Murphy, violinists Florian Deuter, Bojan Čičić, Adrian Butterfield, Ilia Korol, John Holloway, and Ingrid Matthews, singers Evelyn Tubb, Marijana Mijanovic, and Leif Aruhn-Solén, Ingrid Matthews, harpsichordist Steven Devine, lutenist Michael Fields and others. They have published several CDs, and have appeared at several international festivals, including the Boston Early Music Festival, Piccolo Spoleto Festival (in Charleston, South Carolina), the Belgrade Early Music Festival in Serbia, Korkyra Baroque Festival and the Varaždin Baroque Evenings in Croatia, as well as the Vammala Early Music Festival (Sastamala Gregoriana) in Finland. The group members have also been on the faculty of the Belgrade Baroque Academy since its establishment in 2013.

== Discography ==
Album	Soloist(s)	Label	Release year
Buxtehude: Membra Jesu Nostri	Radoslava Vorgić, Dragana Popović, Bojan Bulatović, Marko Živković, Sreten Manojlović	Edition Lilac	2018
J.S. Bach: Violin Concertos	Carrie Krause, Adriane Post	Edition Lilac	2016
Baroque Christmas (Concertos and Cantatas by Corelli, Torelli, Manfredini, Scarlatti, Buxtehude and Bernhard)	Kathryn Mueller, Wanda Yang Temko, Adriane Post, Carrie Krause, Martha Perry, Anna Griffis, André Laurent O'Neil	Edition Lilac	2011
Vivaldi: Concertos	Carrie Krause, Daniela Giulia Pierson, Michael Fields, André Laurent O'Neil, Christina Babich Rosser	Edition Lilac	2010
Handel: Arias	Leif Aruhn-Solén	Edition Lilac	2010
Pergolesi: Stabat Mater	Evelyn Tubb, Terry Barber	Edition Lilac	2008
Carissimi: Oratorios Jonas and Jephte	The Oxford Chorale, Julia Matthews, Kevin Sutton	Edition Lilac	2007
Charpentier: Messe de minuit / Handel: Organ Concertos	The Canterbury Choir, Brad Hughley	Edition Lilac	2005
Purcell: Dido and Aeneas	Evelyn Tubb, Thomas Meglioranza, Julia Matthews,	Edition Lilac	2004
Trio Sonatas & Chaconnas	New Trinity Baroque	Edition Lilac	2003
