= Early music festivals =

Festivals focused on pre-Beethoven music

List of early music festivals
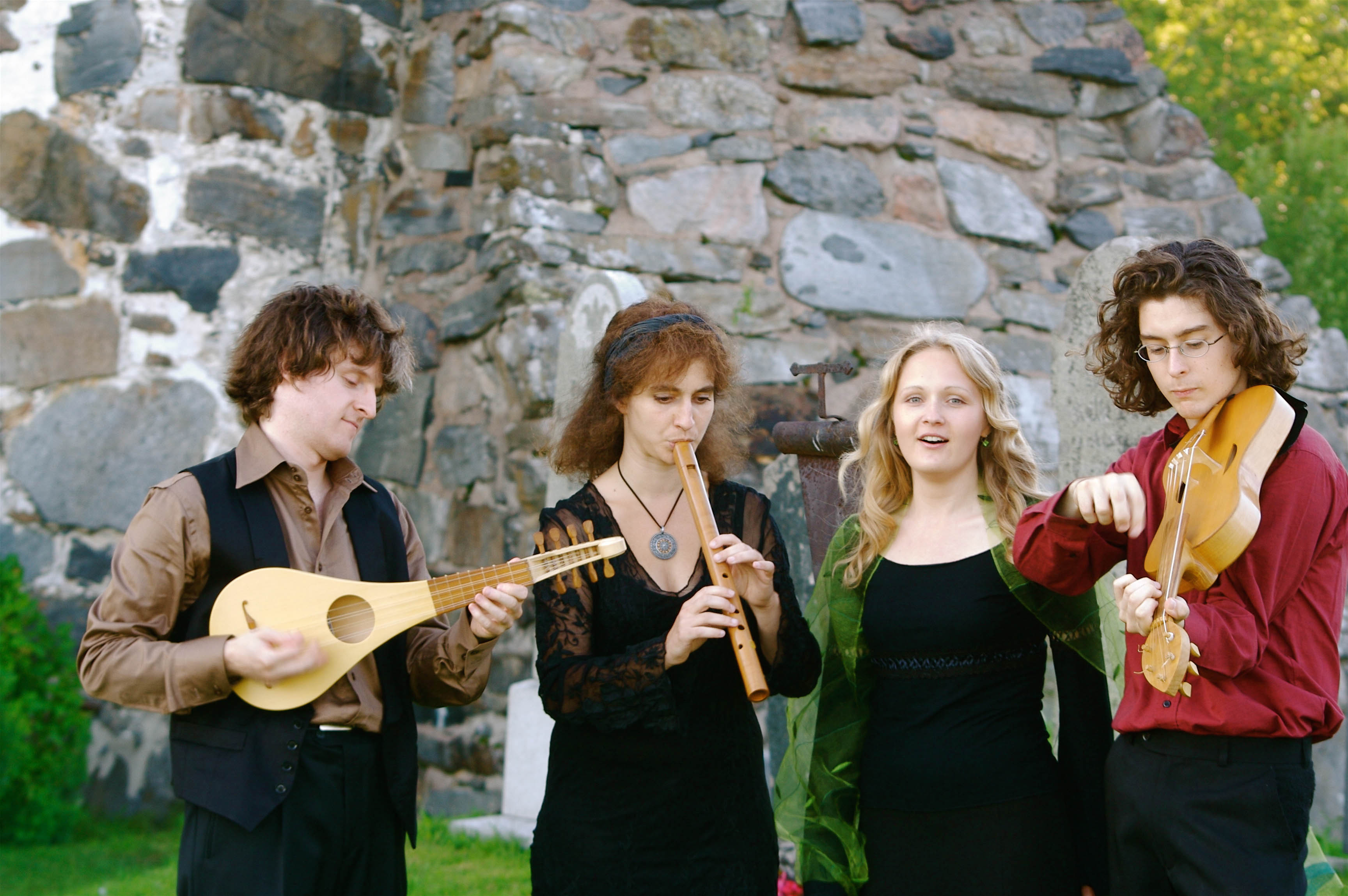

General Information
- Related genres: Early music, classical music, folk music
- Location: Worldwide
- Related events: Category:Early music festivals, Category:Classical music festivals, folk festivals, maritime music festivals
- Related topics: Historically informed performance, early music revival

Early music festivals are a generic term for musical festivals focused on music before Beethoven, or including historically informed performance of later works. The increase in the number of music festivals specializing in early music is a reflection of the early music revival of the 1970s and 1980s. Many larger festivals, such as the Aix-en-Provence Festival, also include early music sections, as do, inevitably, festivals of sacred music, such as the Festival de Música Sacra do Baixo Alentejo, in Portugal. Although most early music festivals are centered on commercial performance, many also include workshops. This article includes an incomplete list of early music festivals, which may overlap with topics such as the list of Bach festivals, list of maritime music festivals, list of opera festivals, and in some cases, list of folk festivals.

== List of festivals by country ==
Note that this list includes festivals that are annual unless otherwise listed. Festivals which were notable, producing radio-broadcasts and recordings, but now defunct, are listed with an indent at the end of each country listing; for example, Gottorfer Barockmusiktage, Germany. Festival Opera Barocca

=== Australia ===
- Brisbane Baroque - previously Hobart Baroque, ran until 2016
- MIFOH Melbourne International Festival of Organ and Harpsichord, founded by Sergio di Pieri in 1971 and run by an entirely voluntary group until the last concert in 2007. A further series of annual concerts running on the same framework (of concerts, visiting distinguished overseas musicians, and masterclasses) was operated by Professor John Griffiths from 2007-2010, a long-time participant in MIFOH

=== Austria ===
- Resonanzen Konzerthaus, Vienna.
- Trigonale Festival der Alten Musik, Sankt Veit an der Glan, Carinthia. Sept.
- Internationale Barocktage, Stift Melk. May/June.
- Innsbrucker Festwochen der Alten Musik. July/August.
- Donaufestwochen im Strudengau. July/August
- Salzburg Whitsun Festival. May/June

=== Bolivia ===
- Festival de Chiquitos

=== Belgium ===
- Festival van Vlaanderen, section Musica Antiqua Bruges, July/August
- Laus Polyphoniae - Festival van Vlaanderen Antwerp August
- Festival van Vlaanderen, Gent. Sept/October.
- Festival de Musique Ancienne en Wallonie
- Baroque Music at Chateau of Chimay, Hainaut.
- Festival Les Nuits de Septembre - Festival de Wallonie, Liège

=== Brazil ===
- Festival de música colonial brasileira e música antiga. July.
- Festival de Música Coral Renascentista Gil de Roca Sales.

=== Canada ===
- Montreal Baroque. June.
- Vancouver Early Music Festival. August.
- Pacific Baroque Festival, Victoria, B.C., February/March
- Lamèque International Festival of Baroque Music, July

=== Croatia ===
- Rovigno Baroque Music Festival
- Varaždin Baroque Evenings (Varaždinske barokne večeri), Baroque Festival since 1971.
- Dubrovnik Summer Festival (Dubrovačke ljetne igre), since 1950.
- Korkyra Baroque Festival (Korčulanski barokni festival).
- Musical Evenings in St Donat (Glazbene večeri u sv. Donatu), since 1960.

=== Czech Republic ===
- Festival of early music at Český Krumlov
- Letní slavnosti staré hudby (Summer festivities of early music), Prague.
- Opera Barocca, Prague.
- Summer School of Early Music Prachatice

=== Denmark ===
- Copenhagen Renaissance Music Festival. October–November.
- Copenhagen Baroque Festival , September
- Baroktoberfest, Oktober

=== Finland ===
- BRQ Vantaa. August.
- Sastamala Gregoriana, Sastamala. July. Since 1995.

=== France ===
- Festival d'Ambronay, Ambronay. Since 1980.
- Festival de Beaune July.
- Festival de l'Abbaye Royale de Fontevraud, Fontevraud Abbey. Since 1975.
- Festival de Musique Ancienne de Saint Sevin, Saint Sevin. August.
- Musiques à la Chabotterie, Vendée. Since 1997.
- Marseille March.
- Nantes Spring. May/June
- Musique ancienne, Maguelone, Villeneuve-lès-Maguelone June.
- Haut-Jura June.
- Aix-en-Provence Festival July.
- Le Festival Renaissances, Bar-le-Duc. July.
- Musique ancienne de Callas, Callas, Var. July.
- Musique et Mémoire, Faucogney-et-la-Mer. July.
- Rencontres de Musique Médiévale du Thoronet. Le Thoronet Abbey
- Festival de musique de Conques. July–August.
- Festival Baroque de Tarentaise, Albertville. August.
- Le Festival International de Musique Ancienne de Simiane, Simiane-la-Rotonde. August.
- Festival de Sablé, Sablé-sur-Sarthe. August
- Academie Bach, Arques-la-Bataille. Aug.
- Festival de musique de La Chaise-Dieu, Auvergne. Aug-Sept.
- Festival Les Riches Heures de La Réole. Septembre
- Festival baroque de Pontoise. Sept-Oct.
- Festival de Lanvellec. Oct.
- Marseille Autumn. October- December
- Festival Paris Baroque, Paris. November–December
- Saint-Michel en Thiérache, Saint-Michel, Aisne.
- Viola da gamba festival Asfeld.
- Orléans Bach Festival

=== Germany ===
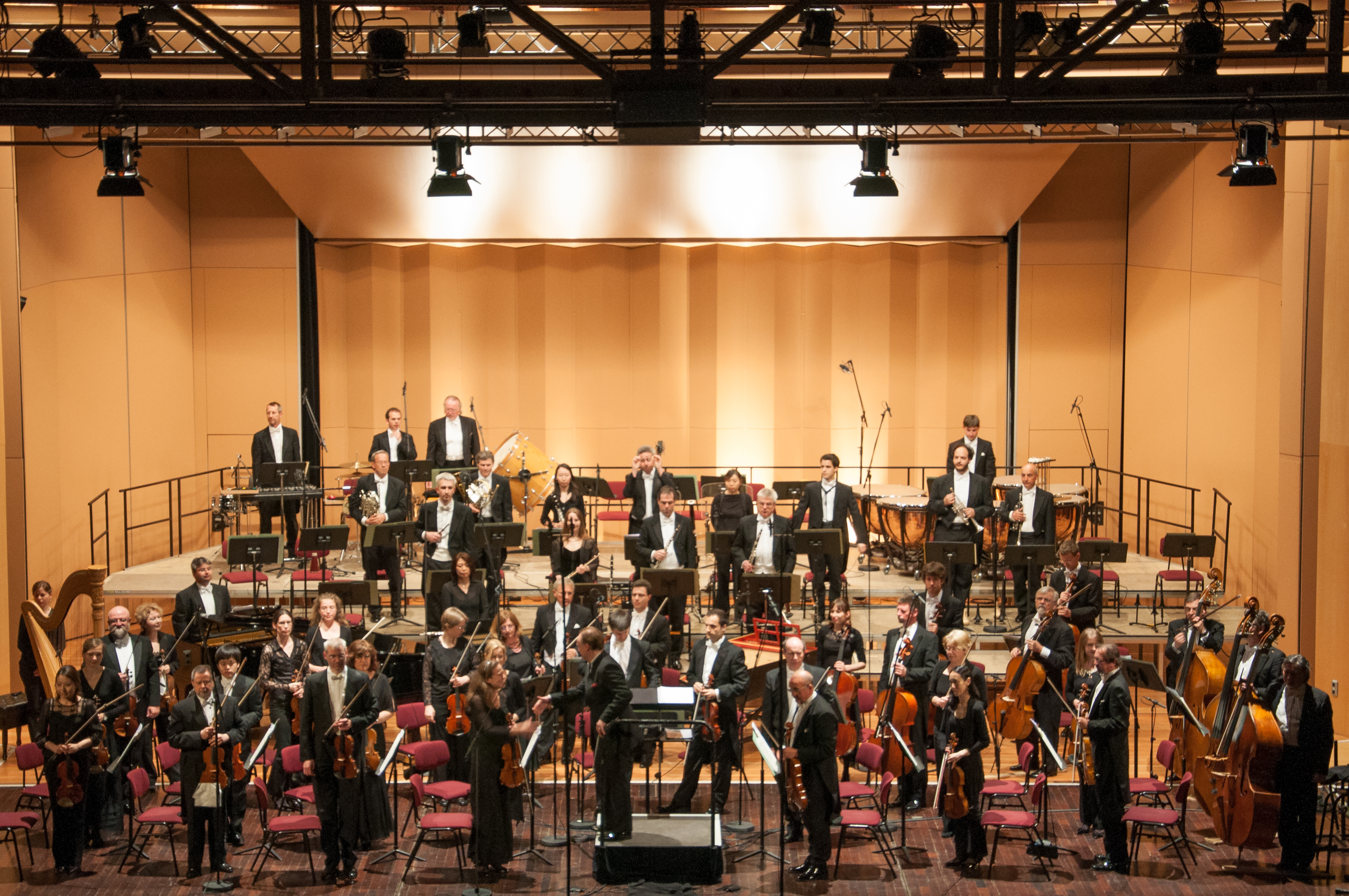
Internationale Händel-Festspiele 2013

- Bachwoche Ansbach, Ansbach summer.
- Arolser Barockfestspiele. Bad Arolsen. May.
- Bach-Biennale Weimar. Since 2008, biennial in July.
- Festival alter Musik Bernau, Berlin.
- Festival Güldener Herbst, Thuringia; in Weimar, Erfurt, Meiningen, Rudolstadt, Sondershausen, Eisenach, Kühndorf, Suhl and Molsdorf. October
- Händelfestspiele
  - Handel Festival, Halle (June)
  - Handel Festival, Göttingen (May)
  - Händel-Festspiele Karlsruhe (February)
- Magdeburger Telemann-Festtage, Magdeburg
- Tage Alter Musik, Berlin Oct.
- Landshuter Hofmusiktage, Landshut
- Bachtage, Potsdam
- Bachfest Leipzig, Leipzig. June
- Montalbâne festival of Medieval music, Schloss Neuenburg, Freyburg. June.
- Musica Viva, Osnabrück Land. Schloss Bad Iburg, Schloss Gesmold, Schloss Königsbrück, various churches and monasteries. September.
- Tage Mitteldeutscher Barockmusik.
- Tage Alter Musik Herne, Herne. November.
- Tage Alter Musik, Regensburg, Whitsun
- Tage Alter Musik im Saarland (TAMiS), Saarbrücken, March/April
- Sanssouci, Potsdam June
- Thüringer Bachwochen, Thuringia. March/April.
- Bayreuth Baroque Sept.
- Zeitfenster - Biennale Alter Musik, Berlin. Biannual in April.
- Internationales Heinrich-Schütz-Fest. Moves location, biannual.
  - Gottorfer Barockmusiktage, ran from 2002-2006.

=== Hungary ===
- Early Music Festival at Palace of Arts (Budapest). Since 2015, first quarter of the year.
- Early Music Days at palace of Eszterhaza - Fertőd June/July, since 1984

=== Iceland ===
- Skálholt Music Festival, Skálholt, summer festival since 1975
- Reykjavík Early Music Festival, since 2024

=== Ireland ===
- East Cork Early Music Festival
- Galway Early Music Festival
- Sligo Festival of Baroque Music

=== Israel ===
- Bach in Jerusalem Festival

=== Italy ===
- Grandezze & Meraviglie, Festival Musicale Estense, Modena. September/November Since 1998
- Settimane barocche di Brescia, Brescia.
- Festival di Cremona Claudio Monteverdi, Cremona. May.
- FIMA - Festival di Musica Antica, Urbino. July.
- FTMA - Festival Toscano di Musica Antica. Pisa.
- Festival Galuppi, Venice.
- Collegio Ghislieri di Pavia - Primavera Barocca. March–June. Since 2003.
- Musica Antica a Magnano, Magnano July/Sept.
- Mousiké - Festival di musica antica del Mediterraneo, Bari
- Musica Antica in Sicilia, Associazione Antonio il Verso, Palermo. December
- Piccola Accademia di Montisi, Tuscany. Workshops for harpsichordists. July.
- Garda Trentino International Early Music Weeks, Riva del Garda.

Major festivals with some early music events:

- Stresa Festival. Stresa, Lake Maggiore. Some early music events.
- Ravenna Festival. Some early music events. June/July.
- Bolzano Festival. Some early music events.
  - Alessandro Scarlatti Festival, Palermo, Sicily, ran 1999-2002

=== Latvia ===
- Senās mūzikas festivāls, every July in the Rundāle Palace.
- Baroka mūzikas dienas Rēzeknē (Baroque Music Days Rezekne), every September 2005 – 2016 in Rezekne city, Latgale region and Riga.

=== Lithuania ===
- Banchetto Musicale early music festival, every September in Vilnius, since 1989

=== Malta ===
- Valletta Baroque Festival

=== Netherlands ===
- Festival Oude Muziek Utrecht.
- Geelvinck Early Piano Festival, Amsterdam.

=== Norway ===
- Festival, Bergen.
- Festival, Larvik.
- St.Olav Festival, Trondheim.Ringve International Summer Course

=== Poland ===
- ANNUM festival Tarnowskie Góry, Chorzów
- Maj z Muzyką Dawną - May with Early Music, Wrocław
- Jarosław Early Music Festival, Jarosław
- Misteria Paschalia, Kraków. Easter
- Mikołaj Radomski (Early Music Festival), Radom
- International Festival Wratislavia Cantans, Wrocław
- Forum Musicum, Wrocław
- Early Music Academy, Wrocław

=== Portugal ===
- Encontros de Música Antiga de Loulé - Francisco Rosado, EMAL-FR, every October since 1999, Loulé
- West Coast Early Music Festival, Oeiras, Lisbon
- SIMA - Série ibérica de Música Antiga, Castelo Branco
- Festival Internacional de Música Barroca de Faro, FIMBF, Faro
- Fora do Lugar - Early Music(s) International Festival, Idanha-a-Nova (UNESCO Creative City of Music)
- CásterAntiqua - Ovar Early Music Festival, Ovar

=== Romania ===
- Bucharest Early Music Festival, Bucharest
- Miercurea Ciuc Early Music Festival, Miercurea Ciuc

=== Russia ===
- Sankt Petersburg International Early Music Festival, Saint Petersburg

=== Serbia ===
- Belgrade Early Music Festival

=== Slovakia ===
- "Dni starej hudby" - Days of early music, Bratislava.

=== Slovenia ===
- Radovljica Early Music Festival, Radovljica, Velesovo and Ljubljana. August.
- Seviqc Brežice – Festival Brezice, Brežice.

=== Spain ===
- Festival Jordi Savall, Catalonia, since 2021.
- Festival de Música Antigua de Barcelona, Barcelona, since 1977.
- Festival de Música Antigua Iberoamericana "Domingo Marcos Durán". Cáceres.
- Festival de Música Antigua de Daroca, Zaragoza, since 1979. August.
- Festival de Música Antigua de Sevilla, Seville.
- Festival de Música Antigua, Gijón.
- Festival de Música Antigua de Úbeda y Baeza. Úbeda and Baeza since 1997.
- Festival Internacional de Música y Danza de Granada
- Música Antigua Aranjuez, Aranjuez.
- Musica Antigua Aracena, Aracena.
  - Trobadories d'en Guillem de Bergueda, Berga, Berguedà. Named after Guilhem de Berguedan. ran 2006-2007
  - Festival de Música Antigua de Sant Martí Vell, Gironès.
- Festival Internacional de Música Antigua de Xàtiva, Valencia

=== Sweden ===
- Drottningholm Palace Theatre August.
- Göteborg International Organ Academy. August.
- NoMeMus. Nordic festival for Medieval music. During Söderköpings Gästabud. August/September.
- Palladium Baroque. Malmö. Feb.
- Stockholm Early Music Festival. The largest international event for historical music in the Nordic countries. First week in June since 2002.
- Söderköpings Gästabud. Medieval fayre in Söderköping. August/September.
- Trollhättans TIDIG MUSIK-dagar. Early music days in Trollhättan. May.

=== Switzerland ===
- Early Music Festival - La Folia. Rougemont. May/June.
- Festival Alte Musik Zürich. March.
- Nox Illuminata, Basel, cf. Schola Cantorum Basiliensis.
- Festival Bach de Lausanne. Oct/Nov.
- Festival Musikdorf Ernen. Ernen, Switzerland. July.
- Bachwochen Thun, Thun, August/September
- Cantar di Pietre. Lugano, Switzerland. October–November.

=== United Kingdom ===
- Medieval Music in the Dales, Yorkshire. September.
- Birmingham Early Music Festival.
- Brighton Early Music Festival, Oct/Nov.
- English Bach Festival (ran from 1963 to 2009)
- Leicester Early Music Festival. June.
- Lufthansa Festival of Baroque Music, London. May.
- York Early Music Festival, July.
- The London International Festival of Early Music. Three-day festival and instrument fair. November.
- London Handel Festival. Feb-April.
- Beverley and East Riding Early Music Festival, Yorkshire, May.
- Spitalfields Festival, London. June.
- Cotswold Early Music Festival, Cirencester. June.
- Edinburgh International Festival, some early music events. Aug/Sept.

=== United States ===
- American Bach Soloists Festival & Academy. San Francisco, California. Since 2010.
- Amherst Early Music Festival. New London, Connecticut.
- Aston Magna Music Festival. Great Barrington, Massachusetts.
- Baldwin Wallace Bach Festival
- Bloomington Early Music Festival, Indiana
- Berkeley Festival & Exhibition, presented by The San Francisco Early Music Society. Since 1990.
- Boston Early Music Festival.
- Boulder Bach Festival. Boulder, Colorado
- Carmel Bach Festival, Carmel-by-the-Sea, California.
- English Bach Festival
- Indianapolis Early Music Festival, Indiana. Since 1966.
- Houston Early Music Festival, Houston, Texas.
- Madison Early Music Festival, Madison, Wisconsin. Since 2000.
- New York Early Music Celebration, New York City. Since 2004.
- Piccolo Spoleto Festival Early Music Series, Charleston, South Carolina.
- Santa Cruz Baroque Festival, Santa Cruz, California.
- Texas Toot - The Texas Early Music Festival. Workshops.
- Twin Cities Early Music Festival and Baroque Instrumental Program. Minneapolis/St. Paul, Minnesota. Since 2014.
- Washington Early Music Festival], Washington, D.C.

== See also ==
- Historically informed performance
- List of music festivals
- List of Bach festivals
- List of opera festivals
- List of maritime music festivals
- List of folk festivals
- List of Celtic festivals
- Category:Music festivals
- Category:Early music festivals
- Category:Choral festivals
- Category:Classical music festivals
- Category:Chamber music festivals
- Category:Contemporary classical music festivals
- Category:Opera festivals
