= Edition Lilac =

- Founded: 2004
- Country of origin: United States

Edition Lilac is an American independent record label formed in 2004. It specializes in early music and historically informed performances. The label has issued performances by New Trinity Baroque, Furor Musicus, Minstrel, Canso, London Symphony Orchestra, Predrag Gosta, Evelyn Tubb, Michael Fields, Antoinette Lohmann, Darko Karajic, Edicole Grevi and Brad Hughley. It has featured music by composers such as Handel, J. S. Bach, Charpentier, Carissimi, Buxtehude, as well as Andreas Makris.

== See also ==
- List of record labels
