= EMN =

EMN may refer to:

- Early Music Network
- Eastman Chemical Company, an American chemical company
- École de management de Normandie, a French business school
- École des mines de Nantes, a French engineering school
- Eman language
- Equity market neutral
- European Migration Network
- Every Mother's Nightmare, an American heavy metal band
- Néma Airport, in Mauretania
