= Radoslava Vorgić =

Serbian opera singer

Radoslava Vorgić Žuržovan
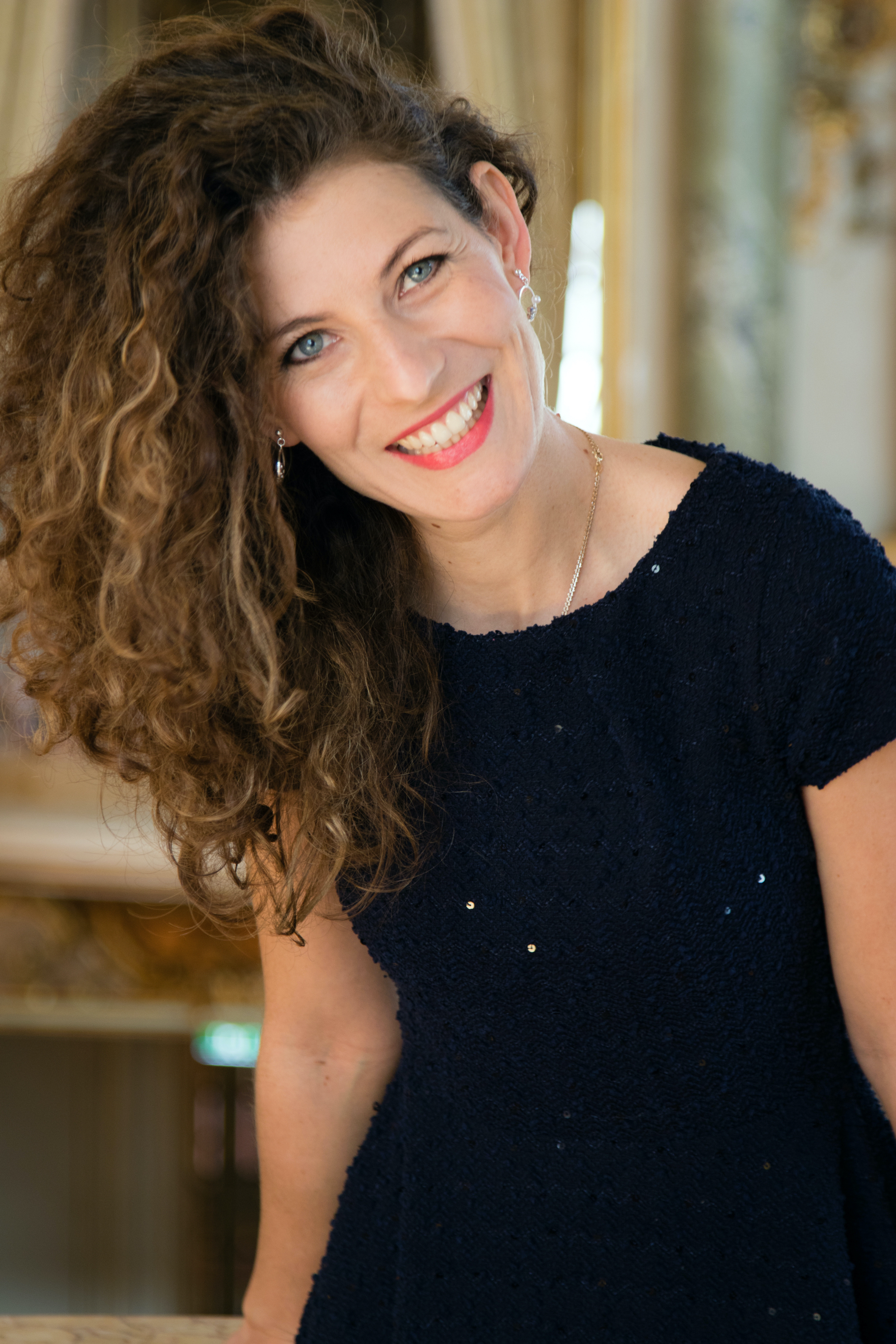

Background information
- Born: 12 August 1985 (age 41); Novi Sad, Serbia
- Genres: Classical music, baroque music
- Occupation: Soprano
- Years active: 2010 –

Radoslava Vorgić (married: Vorgić Žuržovan; Novi Sad, August 12, 1985) is a Serbian opera singer and music pedagogue. She is particularly renowned in Baroque music, German Lied and contemporary music.

== Education ==
Radoslava Vorgić was born in Novi Sad, where she completed her education at the Isidor Bajić Secondary School of Music. She graduated in solo singing under the tutelage of opera singer Milica Stojadinović and general music pedagogy at the Academy of Arts. She earned her master's degree at the Hochschule für Musik – Johannes Gutenberg University Mainz in the class of Claudia Eder, and later obtained her doctorate at the Academy of Arts in Novi Sad. She furthered her training in Germany, Ireland, Austria, the United Kingdom, Serbia, and Italy, attending various courses and masterclasses with prominent singers and educators. She has been a scholarship recipient of several domestic and international institutions.

== Career ==
Radoslava Vorgić's professional career officially began in 2010, encompassing solo concerts and performances with various orchestras. Notably, she collaborated with the London-based ensemble New Trinity Baroque, led by harpsichordist Predrag Gosta. Several compositions have been written specifically for her voice, and her vocal performances are part of the permanent archives of Radio Television of Vojvodina. Additionally, her voice features on CDs released by the Institute for Music and Media at the Robert Schumann University in Düsseldorf and the American record label "Edition Lilac."

Her graduation solo concert was held at the Gallery of Matica Srpska in Novi Sad in 2010. In 2011, she debuted at the State Opera in Mainz, portraying Lucia in Benjamin Britten's opera The Rape of Lucretia as part of the Young Ensemble program. Since 2015, she has been a regular guest singer at the State Opera in Wiesbaden, debuting as Maria Belcanto in Peter Lund's children's opera Witch Hilary Goes to the Opera. In 2019, she performed her first role at the National Theatre in Belgrade, playing Fortuna in Monteverdi's The Coronation of Poppea. Together with her colleague Maja Grgić, she co-wrote the libretto for the children's opera Three Tickets to the Opera, performed at the Novi Sad Youth Theatre.

In 2022, at the Matica srpska, she premiered two solo songs by Novi Sad composers Dorotea Vejnović and Ljubomir Nikolić, based on texts from William Shakespeare's historical play Henry V. She was accompanied by British and Serbian pianists Julius Drake and Stefan Rakić. The concert, sponsored by the "Laza Kostić" Foundation as part of its 30th-anniversary celebrations during Novi Sad's tenure as the European Capital of Culture, was broadcast live at the Shakespeare Institute in Stratford-upon-Avon.

Member of the Association of Musical Artists of Serbia and the New Belgrade Opera. She is a professional associate with the Academy of Arts in Novi Sad. Fluent in German, English, and Italian. She lives and works between Serbia and Germany.

== Awards and achievements ==
Radoslava Vorgić is the recipient of numerous awards, including the Ibla Grand Prize and a special award for performing Handel, the Rheinsberg Chamber Opera Award, international competitions in Neustadt and the Baroque Competition Tamiš in Saarbrücken, as well as solo singing competitions in Ruma and Belgrade.

She was a scholarship recipient of the Walter Kaminski Foundation in Germany, the Academy of Sciences and Literature in Mainz, the "Dositej" Fund for Young Talents of the Ministry of Youth and Sports, the Fund for the Advancement of Young Vocal Arts "Melanija Bugarinović and her daughter Mirjana Kalinović Kalin," the humanitarian fund "Privrednik," as well as an ambassador and the first lady knight of the "Laza Kostić" Foundation.

== Opera Roles (Selection) ==
- The Rape of Lucretia – Benjamin Britten – Lucia (State Opera of Mainz, Germany, 2011)
- The First Murder or Cain – Alessandro Scarlatti – Abel (State Opera of Mainz, Germany, 2012)
- Koskoletto – Jacques Offenbach – Koskoletto (International Jacques Offenbach Festival, Bad Ems, Germany, 2012)
- Rinaldo – George Frideric Handel – Armida (State Opera of Mainz, Germany, 2013–2014)
- Orlando – George Frideric Handel – Angelica (Opera and Theatre "Madlenianum" in Belgrade, Novi Sad Synagogue, National Theatre "Toša * Jovanović" in Zrenjanin, National Theatre in Pirot, Serbia, 2015)
- Witch Hillary Goes to the Opera – Peter Lund – Maria Belacanta (State Opera of Wiesbaden, Germany, 2015)
- Judith – Alessandro Scarlatti – Judith (State Opera of Wiesbaden, Germany, 2016)
- Pimpinone – Georg Philipp Telemann – Vespetta (Strasbourg, Andlau, France, 2017)
- Mitridate, re di Ponto – Wolfgang Amadeus Mozart – Aspasia (Biel Solothurn State Opera, Switzerland, 2018)
- The Barber of Seville – Gioachino Rossini – Rosina (Gut Immling Festival, Bad Endorf, Germany, 2024)

== Awards ==
- First place in the fourth category at the XII International Solo Singers Competition “Nikola Cvejić” (Ruma, Serbia, 2009)
- First place for a young, promising artist at an international competition (Neustadt, Germany, 2010)
- Second place and audience award at an international competition (Neustadt, Germany, 2011)
- Award for early music with a baroque ensemble and third place (Saarbrücken, Germany, 2014)
- Special award for the performance of the composition “Remembrances of Armida” by Georg Friedrich Handel at the international music competition “Ibla Grand Prize” (Ragusa, Italy, 2017)
- Special charter “Knight” of the “Laza Kostić” Foundation (Novi Sad, 2018)
- Scholarship for attending a master class with a professor Friedmann Relig at the Chamber Opera of the Palace “Rheinsberg” (Rheinsberg, Germany, 2018)
- Diploma for first place at the international online competition “The Song” (2021)
- Diploma for first place at the international online art competition “World Art Games” (2022)
- First place at the international online music competition “Constellation: Power of Music” (2022)
- First prize at the international online music competition “London Classical Music Competition” (2022)
