= Gwinnett (disambiguation) =

Gwinnett can refer to:

- Button Gwinnett, signatory of the US Declaration of Independence
- Gwinnett County, in the US state of Georgia
- Gwinnett Ballet Theatre, Gwinnett County's first non-profit performing arts troupe
- The Gwinnett Stripers, a Triple-A baseball team
- Gwinnett Daily Post
- Gwinnett Technical College
- Gwinnett Gladiators
- Georgia Gwinnett College
- USS Gwinnett (AG-92)
- Gwinnett Medical Center
- Gwinnett Place Mall a regional shopping mall in the county
- Ride Gwinnett, the county's transit system
