= Dido and Aeneas =

Opera by Purcell, circa 1689

- Opera by Henry Purcell
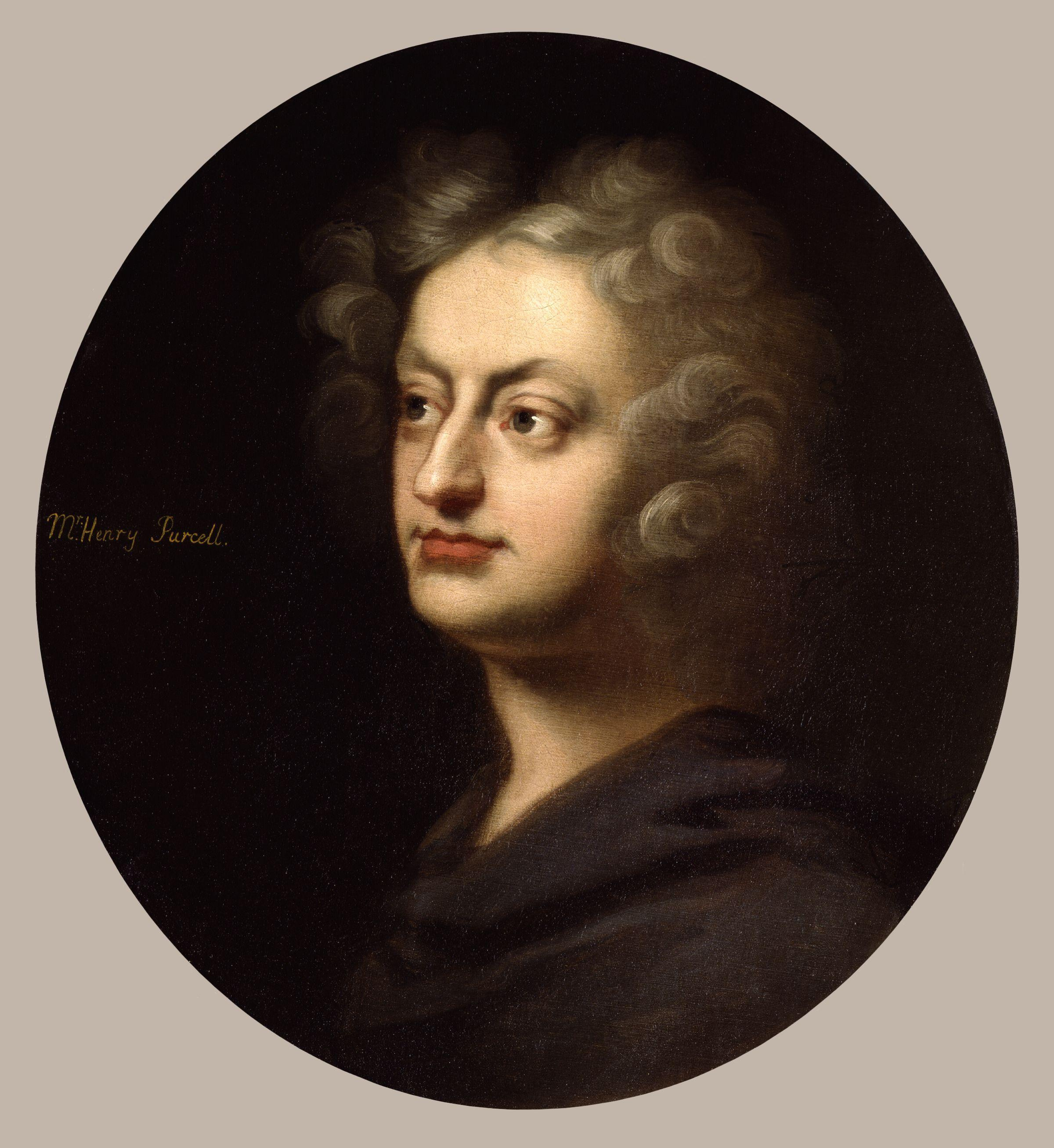
- The composer, portrait by John Closterman, c. 1695
- Librettist: Nahum Tate
- Based on: Book IV of Virgil's Aeneid
- Premiere: 1689; Josias Priest's girls' school, London

Dido and Aeneas (Z. 626) is an opera in a prologue and three acts, written by the English Baroque composer Henry Purcell with a libretto by Nahum Tate. The dates of the composition and first performance of the opera are uncertain. It was composed no later than July 1688, and had been performed at Josias Priest's girls' school in London by the end of 1689. Some scholars argue for a date of composition as early as 1683. The story is based on Book IV of Virgil's Aeneid. It recounts the love of Dido, Queen of Carthage, for the Trojan hero Aeneas, and her despair when he abandons her. A monumental work in Baroque opera, Dido and Aeneas is remembered as one of Purcell's foremost theatrical works. It was also Purcell's only true opera, as well as his only all-sung dramatic work. One of the earliest known English operas, it owes much to John Blow's Venus and Adonis, both in structure and in overall effect.

The influence of Cavalli's opera Didone is also apparent. Both works use the prologue/three acts format and there are similarities between, for instance, Mercury's solo in Didone and the solo "Come away fellow sailors" in Purcell's work.

== Background and context ==
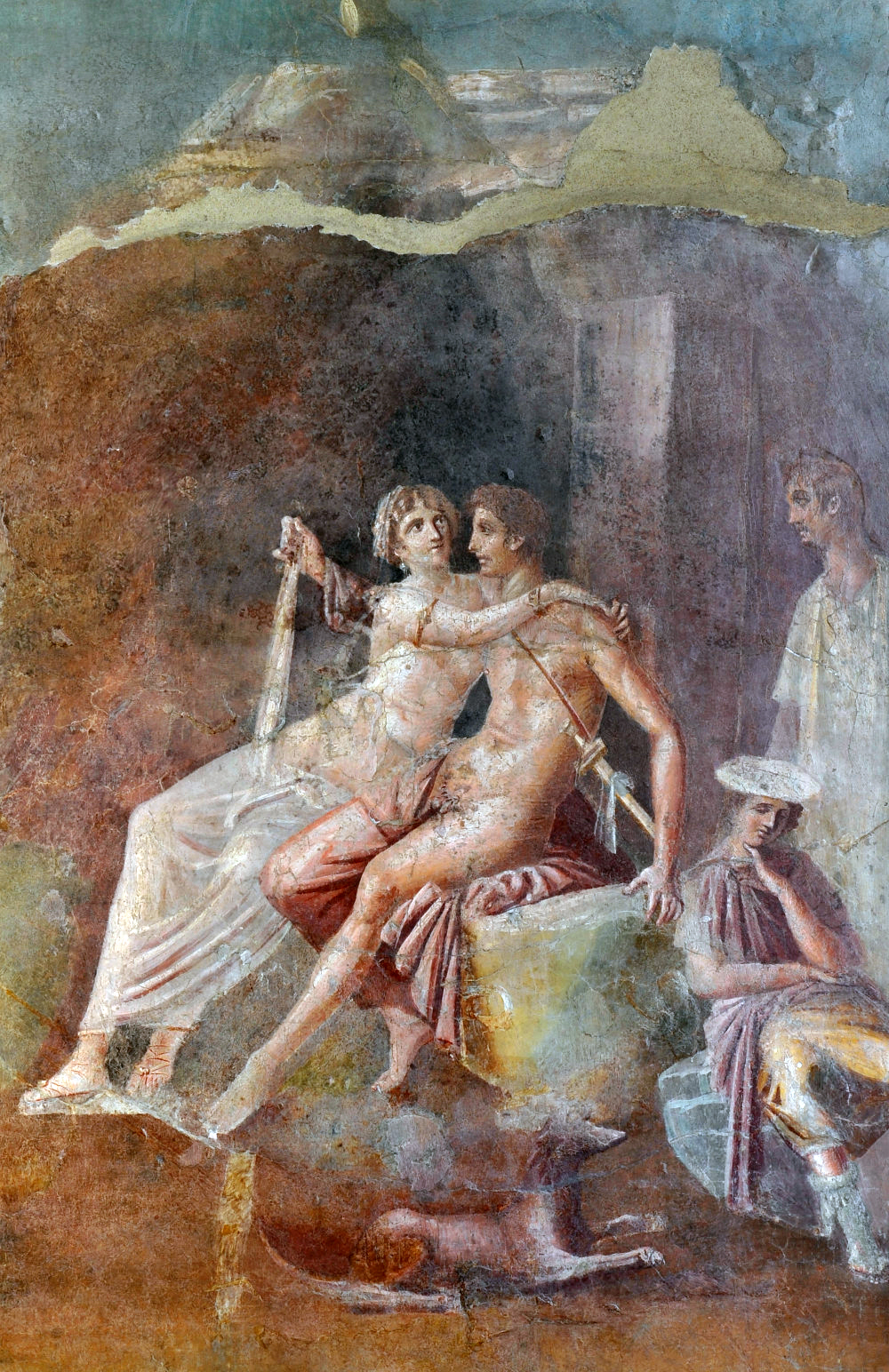
Dido and Aeneas, from a Roman fresco, Pompeian Third Style (10 BC – 45 AD), Pompeii, Italy

Before Dido and Aeneas, Purcell had composed music for several stage works, including nine pieces for Nathaniel Lee's Theodosius, or The Force of Love (1680) and eight songs for Thomas d'Urfey's A Fool's Preferment (1688). He also composed songs for two plays by Nahum Tate (later the librettist of Dido and Aeneas), The Sicilian Usurper (1680) and Cuckold's Haven (1685). Dido and Aeneas was Purcell's first (and only) all-sung opera and derives from the English masque tradition.

=== Libretto ===
Originally based on Nahum Tate's play Brutus of Alba, or The Enchanted Lovers (1678), the opera is likely, at least to some extent, to be allegorical. The prologue refers to the joy of a marriage between two monarchs, which could refer to the marriage between William and Mary. In a poem of about 1686, Tate alluded to James II as Aeneas, who is misled by the evil machinations of the Sorceress and her witches (representing Roman Catholicism, a common metaphor at the time) into abandoning Dido, who symbolises the British people. The same symbolism may apply to the opera. This explains the addition of the characters of the Sorceress and the witches, which do not appear in the original Aeneid. It would be noble, or at least acceptable, for Aeneas to follow the decree of the gods, but not so acceptable for him to be tricked by ill-meaning spirits.

Although the opera is a tragedy, there are numerous seemingly lighter scenes, such as the First Sailor's song, "Take a boozy short leave of your nymphs on the shore, and silence their mourning with vows of returning, though never intending to visit them more." Musicologist Ellen T. Harris considers the callousness and cynicism of the song to underline the "moral" of the story, that young women should not succumb to the advances and promises of ardent young men.

=== Score ===
No score in Purcell's hand exists, and the only seventeenth-century source is a libretto, possibly from the original performance. The earliest extant score, held in the Bodleian Library, was copied no earlier than 1750, well over sixty years after the opera was composed. No later sources follow the act divisions of the libretto, and the music to the prologue is lost. The prologue, the end of the act 2 'Grove' scene, and several dances, were almost certainly lost when the opera was divided into parts to be performed as interludes between the acts of spoken plays in the first decade of the eighteenth century.

The first of the arias to be published separately was "Ah, Belinda" in Orpheus Britannicus. The most famous aria of the work is "When I am laid in earth", popularly known as "Dido's Lament". Both arias are formed on a lamento ground bass. "Dido's Lament" has been performed or recorded by artists far from the typical operatic school, such as Klaus Nomi (as "Death"), Ane Brun and Jeff Buckley. It has also been transcribed or used in many scores, including the soundtrack to the HBO miniseries Band of Brothers (renamed "Nixon's Walk"). It is played annually by a military band at the Cenotaph remembrance ceremony, which takes place on the Sunday nearest to 11 November (Armistice Day) in London's Whitehall. The music is sometimes thought to be too simple for Purcell in 1689, but this may simply reflect that the intended performers were schoolchildren. The work is scored for four-part strings and continuo. The fact that the libretto from the Chelsea School performance indicates two dances for guitar, the "Dance Gittars Chacony" in act 1, and the "Gittar Ground a Dance" in the 'Grove' scene of act 2, has led one scholar to suggest that Purcell envisaged a guitar as a primary member of the continuo group for the opera. Music for neither of these dances is extant, and it seems likely that Purcell did not compose them, but rather left them to be improvised by the guitarist. Several editions of the opera have been made and have been provided with a continuo realisation; a notable, if rather idiosyncratic edition being that made by Imogen Holst and Benjamin Britten. There are a number of editions with realisations, and the opera's accessibility to amateur performers is a feature that has greatly abetted the growth of its popularity in the latter half of the twentieth century. While the Prologue's music has been lost and has not been reconstructed, several realisations of the opera include a solution to the missing ritornello at the end of the second act. Known to have been part of the score, it is now performed as a dance taken from other, similar works by Purcell, or invented outright in the same vein, to keep the integrity and continuity of the performance.

== Performance history ==
=== Premiere and early revivals ===
A letter from the Levant merchant Rowland Sherman associates Dido and Aeneas with Josias Priest's girls' school in Chelsea, London no later than the summer of 1688. The first performance may have taken place as early as 1 December 1687, and evidence suggests that the opera was performed at the school again in 1689. Several scholars have argued that the work was composed for the English court, either for Charles II (and perhaps as early as 1684) or for James II. Following the Chelsea performances, the opera was not staged again in Purcell's lifetime. Its next performance was in 1700 as a masque incorporated into Beauty the Best Advocate, an adapted version of Shakespeare's Measure for Measure at Thomas Betterton's theatre in London.

After 1705 it disappeared as a staged work, with only sporadic concert performances, until 1895 when the first staged version in modern times was performed by students of the Royal College of Music at London's Lyceum Theatre to mark the bicentenary of Purcell's death. Dido and Aeneas received its first performance outside England on 14 December 1895 in a concert version at the University Society in Dublin.

=== 20th- and 21st-century performances ===
Lea Desandre performs When I am laid in Earth with Les Arts Florissants in 2020

Dido and Aeneas premiered in the United States at the Plaza Hotel in New York City on 10 February 1923 performed by the girls of the Rosemary School, although The New York Times noted that "considerable liberties" had been taken with the score. A concert version with professional musicians organised by the Society of Friends of Music took place on 13 January 1924 at the New York City Town Hall, using a score edited by Artur Bodanzky, who also conducted the performance.

As new critical editions of the score appeared, and with the revival of interest in Baroque music, the number of productions steadily increased. After Jonathan Miller's visit to Bornholm, Denmark, Dido was performed in 2007 at the Rønne Theatre, which had been built in 1823. Kevin Duggan conducted. Amongst the new productions of the opera in 2009, the 350th anniversary of Purcell's birth, were those staged by the De Nederlandse Opera, the Royal Opera, London, the Divertimento Baroque Opera Company, and Glimmerglass Opera in Cooperstown, New York. The Royal Opera production, which featured contemporary dance by Wayne McGregor Random Dance and animated effects by Mark Hatchard, formed part of a double bill with Handel's Acis and Galatea. In 2011 the opera was revived by City Wall Productions and set during World War II. A new Opera North production of the opera opened at Leeds Grand Theatre in February 2013. Opera Up Close performed a truncated version in 2011, setting it in an American high school in the 1950s.

=== Adaptations ===
A version of the opera adapted to modern dance was choreographed by the American Mark Morris, who originally danced both the roles of Dido and the Sorceress. It premiered on 11 March 1989 at the Théâtre Varia in Brussels. It has since been performed many times and was filmed in 1995 by Canadian director Barbara Willis Sweete, with Morris in the roles of Dido and the Sorceress. The production was subsequently seen at the Grand Théâtre in Luxembourg, Opéra national de Montpellier, and Sadler's Wells Theatre in London. In the Morris adaptation, as well as another by Sasha Waltz, the characters are each portrayed by both a singer and a dancer, with the dancers on stage and the singers performing from the side of the stage or the orchestra pit.

== Roles ==
Role	Voice type
Dido (also known as Elissa), Queen of Carthage	soprano or mezzo-soprano
Belinda, Dido's handmaid	light soprano
Second Woman, Another Handmaiden	soprano or mezzo-soprano
Aeneas, Trojan Prince	tenor or high baritone
Sorceress/Sorcerer	mezzo-soprano, contralto, countertenor or bass
First Witch/Enchantress	mezzo-soprano
Second Witch/Enchantress	mezzo-soprano
Spirit, in form of Mercury	soprano or countertenor
First Sailor	tenor
Chorus, SATB: all members at one point or another represent courtiers, witches, cupids, and sailors.

== Synopsis ==
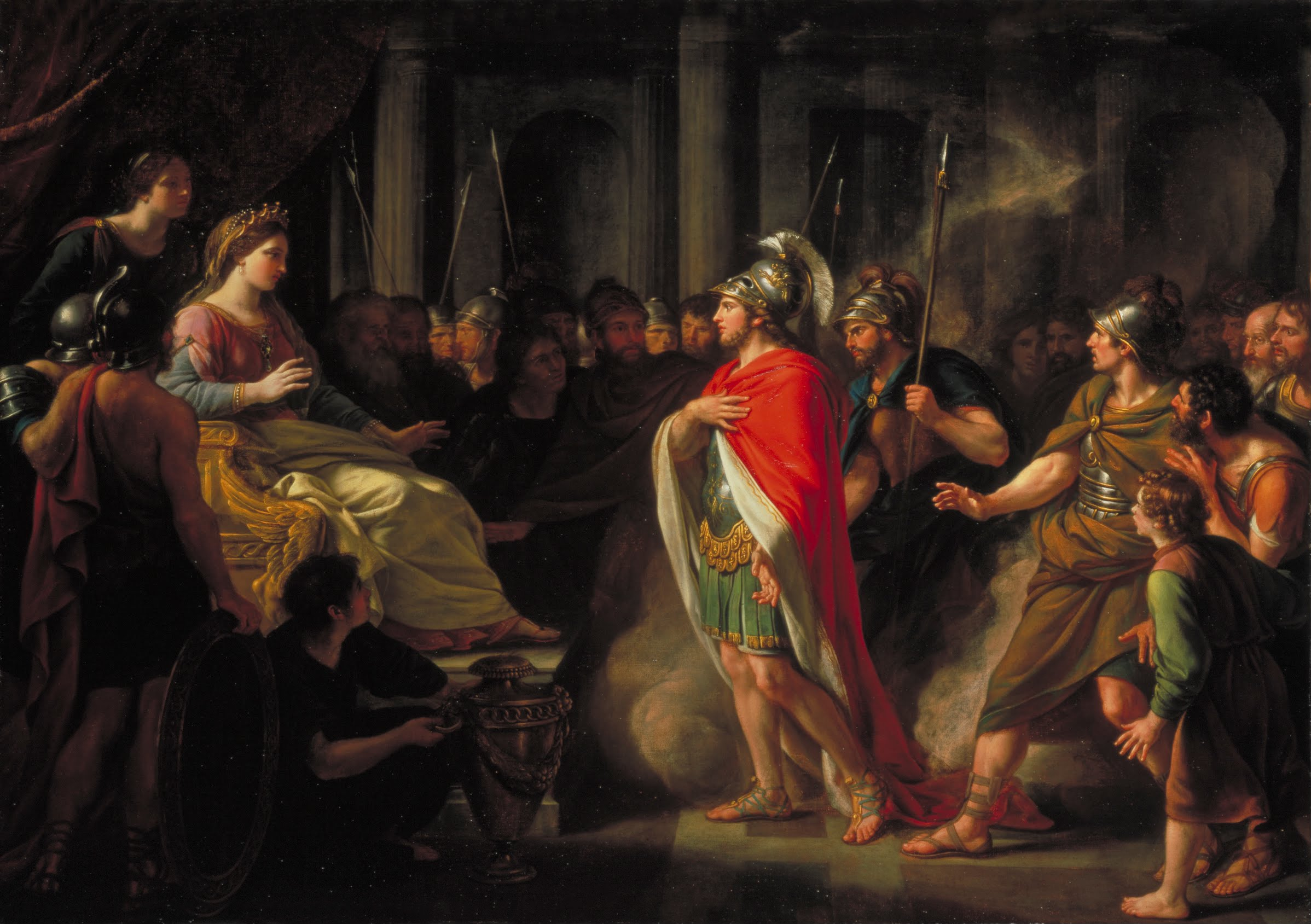
The Meeting of Dido and Aeneas by Nathaniel Dance-Holland, 1766

=== Act 1 ===
Dido's court

The opera opens with Dido in her court with her attendants. Belinda is trying to cheer Dido up, but Dido is full of sorrow, saying 'Peace and I are strangers grown'. Belinda believes the source of this grief to be the Trojan Aeneas, and suggests that Carthage's troubles could be resolved by a marriage between the two. Dido and Belinda talk for a time: Dido fears that her love will make her a weak monarch, but Belinda and the Second Woman reassure her that "The hero loves as well." Aeneas enters the court, and is at first received coldly by Dido, but she eventually accepts his proposal of marriage.

=== Act 2 ===
Scene 1: The cave of the Sorceress

The Sorceress/Sorcerer is plotting the destruction of Carthage and its queen, and summons companions to help with evil plans. The plan is to send her "trusted elf" disguised as Mercury, someone to whom Aeneas will surely listen, to tempt him to leave Dido and sail to Italy. This would leave Dido heartbroken, and she would surely die. The chorus join in with terrible laughter, and the Enchantresses decide to conjure up a storm to make Dido and her train leave the grove and return to the palace. When the spell is prepared, the witches vanish in a thunderclap.

Scene 2: A grove during the middle of a hunt

Stay, Prince and hear
The Sorceress' messenger, in form of Mercury, attempts to convince Aeneas to leave Carthage.

Dido and Aeneas are accompanied by their train. They stop at the grove to take in its beauty. A lot of action is taking place, with attendants carrying goods from the hunt and possibly a picnic in progress, Dido and Aeneas forming the focus of all the activity. This ceases when Dido hears distant thunder, prompting Belinda to tell the servants to prepare for a return to shelter as soon as possible. As every other character leaves the stage, Aeneas is stopped by the Sorceress's elf, who is disguised as Mercury. This pretend Mercury brings the "command of Jove" that Aeneas is to wait no longer in beginning his task of creating a new Troy on Latin soil. Aeneas consents to the wishes of what he believes are the gods, but is heart-broken that he will have to leave Dido. He then goes off-stage to prepare for his departure from Carthage.

=== Act 3 ===
The harbour at Carthage

Preparations are being made for the departure of the Trojan fleet. The sailors sing a song, which is followed shortly by the Sorceress and her companions' sudden appearance. The group is pleased at how well their plan has worked, and the Sorceress sings a solo describing her further plans for the destruction of Aeneas "on the ocean". All the characters begin to clear the stage after a dance in three sections, and then disperse.

The palace

Dido and Belinda enter, shocked at Aeneas' disappearance. Dido is distraught and Belinda comforts her. Suddenly Aeneas returns, but Dido is full of fear before Aeneas speaks, and his words only serve to confirm her suspicions. She derides his reasons for leaving, and even when Aeneas says he will defy the gods and not leave Carthage, Dido rejects him for having once thought of leaving her. After Dido forces Aeneas to leave, she states that "Death must come when he is gone." The opera and Dido's life both slowly come to a conclusion, as the Queen of Carthage sings her last aria, "When I am laid in Earth", also known as "Dido's Lament." The chorus and orchestra then conclude the opera once Dido is dead by ordering the "cupids to scatter roses on her tomb, soft and gentle as her heart. Keep here your watch, and never, never part."

== Recordings ==
The first complete recording of the opera was made by Decca Records in 1935 with Nancy Evans as Dido and Roy Henderson as Aeneas, followed in 1945 by a His Master's Voice release with Joan Hammond and Dennis Noble. Kirsten Flagstad, who had sung the role at the Mermaid Theatre in London, recorded it in 1951 for EMI with Thomas Hemsley as Aeneas. Dido and Aeneas has been recorded many times since the 1960s with Dido sung by mezzo-sopranos such as Janet Baker (1961), Tatiana Troyanos (1968), Teresa Berganza (1986), Anne Sofie von Otter (1989) and Susan Graham (2003). In addition to Joan Hammond and Kirsten Flagstad, sopranos who have recorded the role include Victoria de los Ángeles (1965), Emma Kirkby (1981), Jessye Norman (1986), Catherine Bott (1992), Lynne Dawson (1998), and Evelyn Tubb (2004).

Beginning with two pioneering recordings of the work with original instruments: Joel Cohen's 1979 recording with the Boston Camerata, on Harmonia Mundi, and Andrew Parrott's 1981 recording for Chandos with the Taverner Consort and Players, there was an increasing preference for a more genuine period sound. Further recordings by conductors and ensembles using this approach include those by Christopher Hogwood and the Academy of Ancient Music, William Christie and Les Arts Florissants (1986); Trevor Pinnock and The English Concert (1989); René Jacobs and the Orchestra of the Age of Enlightenment (1998); Emmanuelle Haïm and Le Concert d'Astrée (2003); and Predrag Gosta and New Trinity Baroque (2004). The Haïm recording with Susan Graham as Dido and Ian Bostridge as Aeneas was nominated for the Best Opera Recording in the 2005 Grammy Awards. Another notable recording dates from 1994, with The Scholars Baroque Ensemble and Kym Amps as Dido.

Several performances of the opera have been filmed and are available on DVD, most recently the 2008 performance at the Opéra-Comique in Paris conducted by William Christie and directed by Deborah Warner (FRA Musica FRA001) and the 2009 performance at London's Royal Opera House conducted by Christopher Hogwood and directed by Wayne McGregor (OpusArte OA1018D). The Mark Morris dance version of the opera is also preserved on DVD (recorded 1995, Image Entertainment 8741) as is the dance version by Sasha Waltz (recorded 2005, Arthaus Musik 101311). Leopold Stokowski made a string orchestra arrangement of "Dido's Lament". Others who have recorded it include Matthias Bamert, José Serebrier, Richard Egarr and Iona Brown.

== Other uses of the music ==
German choreographer Pina Bausch used music from two of Purcell's works, The Fairy-Queen and Dido and Aeneas, in one of her dance works, Café Müller.

== See also ==
- List of compositions by Henry Purcell
