= Sastamala Gregoriana =

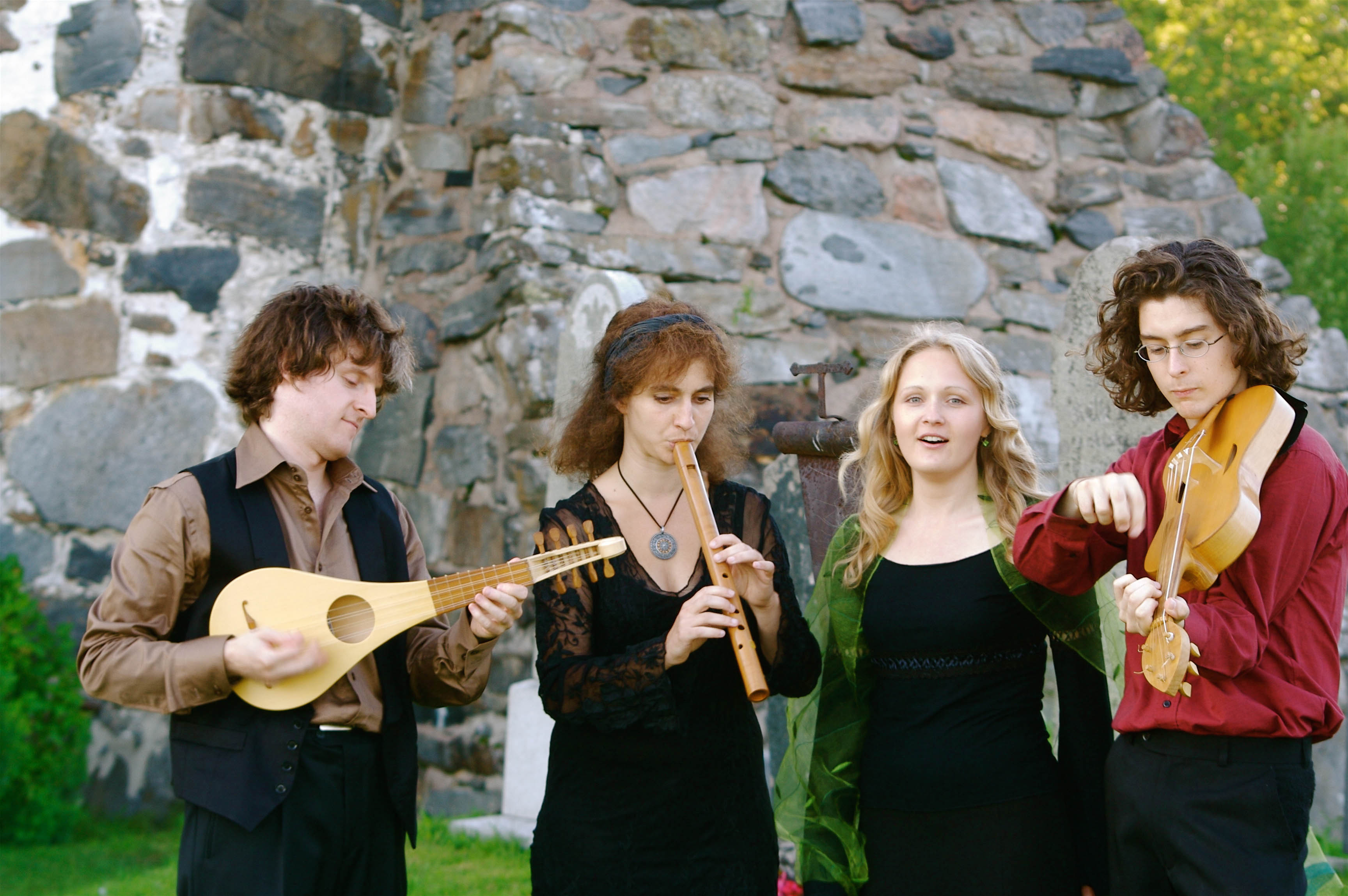
La Morra at Sastamala Gregoriana

Sastamala Gregoriana is an annual early music festival that takes place in late July in the city of Sastamala, Finland. The festival combines an international concert programme of early music from the medieval, renaissance and baroque periods, old lakeside churches of Sastamala with the unique acoustic spaces and warm local atmosphere. An international early music master class complements the concert series.

The festival was named as the Festival of the Year in 2016 by Finland Festivals.

Since 2015 the festival has been granted the EFFE Festival Label (Europe for Festivals, Festivals for Europe) by the European Festivals Association which is co-financed by the European Union. EFFE Label admitted to a festival which is recognized for its devotion to three EFFE Label criteria: artistic commitment, community involvement and a festival’s international and global outlook.

== History ==
Since its inception in 1995, Sastamala Gregoriana has always been a celebration of friendship and collaboration between international and Finnish musicians. The festival's first musical director, Kari Kaarna, had strong professional connections with several English musicians, which led to inviting Paul Hillier and Andrew Lawrence-King to be guest performers in the first festival, with Hillier teaching a master class in early vocal music. Besides vocal master class it has been possible to study early music instruments such as viola da gamba, harpsichord and lute.

Festival's current musical director, lutenist Michael Fields, has shaped the festival to its current state and high musical standards since 2005. He also teaches at the festival's annual early music master class in collaboration with other international and Finnish teachers such as soprano Evelyn Tubb whose vocal master class has been ongoing since the festival's foundation, David Hatcher who teaches viola da gamba, baroque cello and renaissance wind instruments, Corina Marti and Michal Gondko from the mediaeval Ensemble La Morra and Finnish vocal music teacher Hanna Järveläinen and harpsichordist Anna-Maaria Oramo.
