= Nox Illuminata =

Nox Illuminata is a series of international music festivals established in Basel, Switzerland, since 2004, and in Sankt Pölten, Austria, since 2009. It combines traditional European early music with artists and repertoire from other genres and cultures, together with dance, theatre, and visual arts.

Artists who have performed at the festival include the British lutenist Anthony Rooley, the soprano Evelyn Tubb, the Swiss musician Nik Bärtsch with his group Ronin, and the early music ensemble Mediva. The March 2009 Nox Illuminata was covered by the Swiss radio station Schweizer Radio DRS 2.

From December 2009 a parallel 'Nox Illuminata' festival was held at the Festspielhaus St. Pölten in the town of Sankt Pölten, in Austria.
