= John Holloway (musician) =

British baroque violinist and conductor (born 1948)

John Holloway (born 19 July 1948) is a British baroque violinist and conductor, currently based in Bern, Switzerland . He is a pioneer of the early music movement.

Holloway was born in Neath, Wales, and studied in London at the Guildhall School of Music and Drama in London. After initial engagements, including at the Academy of St Martin in the Fields and at the English Chamber Orchestra, he became manager and concertmaster of the Kent Opera Orchestra in the 1970s. After an encounter with Sigiswald Kuijken in 1972, he started playing the Baroque violin and gained a reputation as violinist, teacher and conductor in the field of historically informed performance.

In 1977 he became the concertmaster of Andrew Parrott’s Taverner Players, and in 1978 of Sir Roger Norrington's London Classical Players. He has been the concertmaster for such distinguished directors as Ivor Bolton, Frans Bruggen, William Christie, Simon Halsey, Christopher Hogwood, Ton Koopman, Gustav Leonhardt, Rudolf Lutz, Jean-Claude Malgoire and Nicholas McGegan.

Holloway has taught at the Guildhall School of Music and Drama in London, the Schola Cantorum in Basel, and the Early Music Institute of Indiana University in Bloomington. He has given classes and led workshops in most European countries, as well as in Canada, Columbia, Korea, New Zealand and the USA. In 2004, he was Regents’ Lecturer at UC Berkeley. From 1999 to 2014 he was Professor for Violin and Chamber Music at the Hochschule für Musik "Carl Maria von Weber" in Dresden.

Between 2003 and 2005 Holloway served as musical director of the Indianapolis Baroque Orchestra, and in 2005 and 2006 concertmaster and music director of the period instrument ensemble and orchestra known as New Trinity Baroque.

In 2005 he founded jointly with Belgian conductor and harpsichordist Florian Heyerick and a music agent the Mannheimer Hofkapelle, which in the summer of 2007 could be heard for the first time in 300 years with its original complement of 40 musicians. Between 2006 and 2012, he was artistic director of the international violin competition and master class known as Violine in Dresden.

== Recordings ==
Holloway was the winner of a Gramophone Award in 1991 for his recording of Biber's Mystery Sonatas. He won two Danish Grammy Awards for his recordings of the chamber music and vocal music of Dieterich Buxtehude (1994 and 1997). His CD recordings of the Rosary Sonatas by Heinrich Ignaz Biber and of Sonatas Opus 5 of Jean-Marie Leclair won the Preis der Deutschen Schallplattenkritik ("German Record Critics' Award"). He has recorded Bach's sonatas and partitas for solo violin (for ECM). His recording for ECM of Dowland “Lachrimae Pavans” and other 17th century music won an ICMA (International Classical Music Award) in 2014. In addition to 2 recordings of Vivaldi’s The Four Seasons (with Jean-Claude Malgoire, and with Andrew Parrott) and L'estro Armonico (with The Academy of Ancient Music), he recorded the complete chamber works of Georg Friedrich Händel with the ensemble L'Ecole d'Orphée he founded in 1975. (See also the discography on his website JohnHolloway.org)
