= Festival de Música Coral Renascentista =

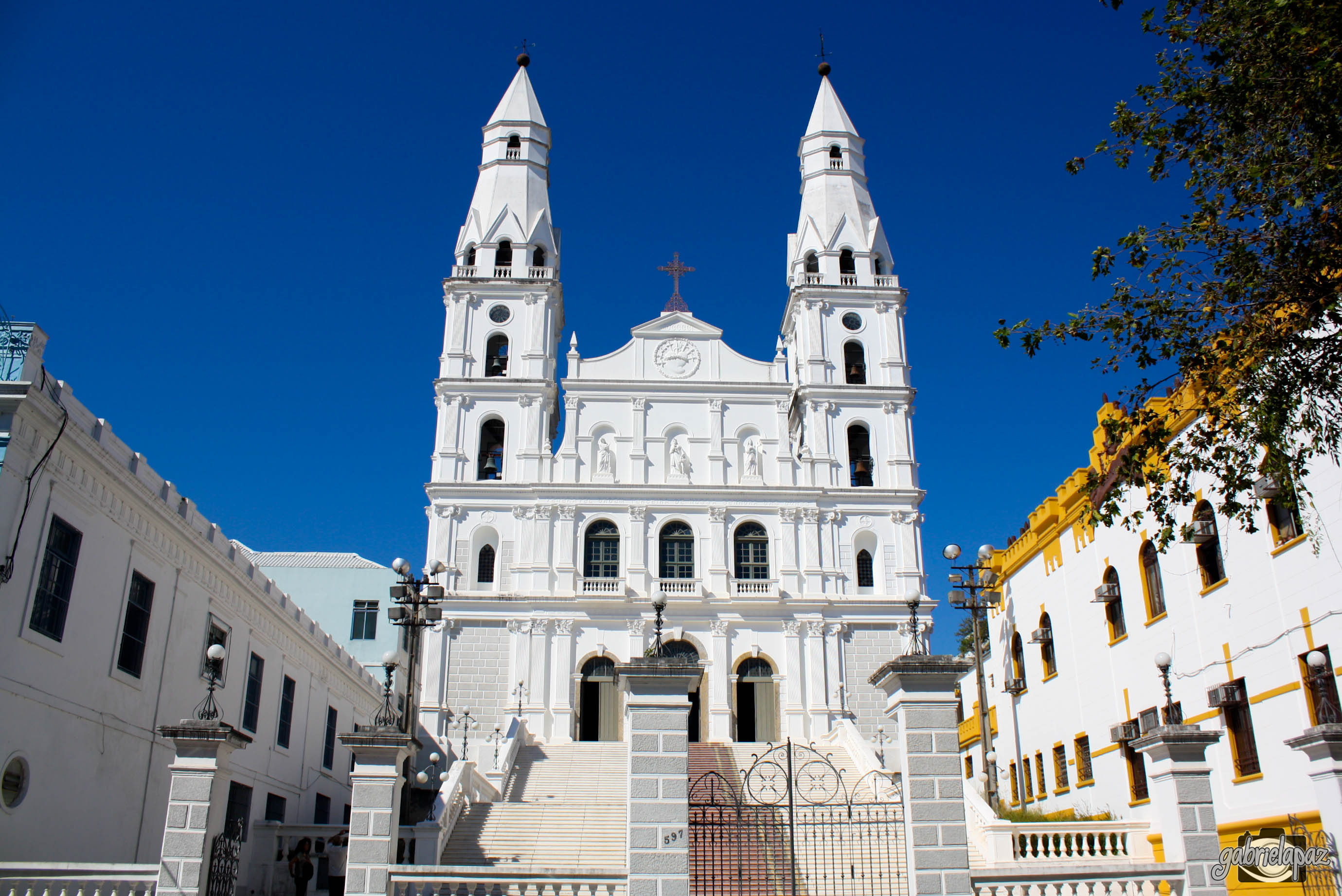
Our Lady of Sorrows Church

Festival de Música Coral Renascentista is a festival of chorus music performing a cappella Renaissance compositions. It takes place at the Minor Basilica of Our Lady of Sorrows in Porto Alegre, Brazil.

The event is a meeting of vocal ensembles singing compositions made around the 16th century (1400–1600), including various types of sacred and secular polyphony. William Byrd, Giovanni da Palestrina, Josquin des Prez, Claudio Monteverdi, John Wilbye, Orlando di Lasso, Jacob Arcadelt, Thomas Morley, Filippo Azzaiolo, and Michael Praetorius, are some of the Renaissance composers performed.

== See also ==
- Renaissance music
- Choir
