= Gwinnett Ballet Theatre =

Gwinnett Ballet Theatre is a nonprofit dance organization and school located in Lawrenceville, Gwinnett County, Georgia (Atlanta vicinity). The artistic director is Lori Zamzow-Wire, and the music director and conductor is Predrag Gosta. The founding director is Lynne Snipes. GBT was under the Artistic Direction of Lisa Sheppard Robson from 1997-2011.

As Gwinnett County’s first and oldest nonprofit performing arts organization, GBT was founded in 1977, and since then it also exists as a school that provides training to those interested to pursue a professional dancing career.

== Notable productions ==
- The Nutcracker
- Alice in Wonderland
- Stravinsky's The Firebird
- Mendelssohn's A Midsummer Night's Dream
- Cinderella
- Journey - an original ballet by Wade Walthall
- Giselle
- Bits and Pieces
- Disney...Songs and Pictures
- Friends and Famous Dances
