= Magdalena Wor =

Polish opera singer (born c. 1981)

Magdalena Wór (born c. 1981) is a Polish opera singer (mezzo-soprano).

== Early life and education ==
Wór was born in Poland, the daughter of Andrzej and Teresa Wor, and grew up in Lądek-Zdrój in the south-west of the country. She relocated to the United States along with her family in 1991 when her father, a physiotherapist, accepted a job in Maine. The family moved to Georgia in 1996, where Wór attended Chattahoochee High School. She sang in church as a child, but did not consider pursuing a career in music until the age of 18. She attended Georgia State University where she received her bachelor's and master's degrees in music.

== Career ==
Wór participated in the San Francisco Opera's Merola Opera Program in 2003, during which she sang Rosina in The Barber of Seville; in Chautauqua Music Institution's Marlena Malas Voice Program; and the GSU Opera Workshop in 2005, where she sang Zita in Gianni Schicchi. In 2006, she participated in the Opera Theatre of Saint Louis's Gerdine Young Artists Program and the Washington National Opera's Domingo-Cafritz Young Artist Program. With the latter, she appeared in a short version of The Ballad of Baby Doe; The Washington Post music critic Tim Page wrote that "Wor sang an aria for Tabor's first wife, Augusta, with appropriate gravity". Also in 2006, she appeared with the Atlanta Symphony Orchestra in performances of Handel’s Messiah and Bach’s Magnificat. An Atlanta music critic wrote of the performance of the Magnificat, "The standout voice belonged to mezzo-soprano Wór … she brought unexpected warmth to Esurientes implevit bonis (‘The hungry he has filled with good’), a darling little aria accompanied by two flutes. She garbled a few words, but it was otherwise a pleasure to hear the plush textures and dark, chocolatey timbre of her voice."

Her first professional appearance was in November 2008, singing Tisbe, one of the ugly stepsisters in La Cenerentola with the Atlanta Opera. She had also sung with In 2010, she sang the title role in Carmen with the Palm Beach Opera.

After a 2016 performance with pianist Brian Ganz, a review in The Washington Post stated that Wór "has that kind of velvety rich mezzo that makes you want to follow her anywhere."

== Awards and recognition ==
- 2010 - First Prize, Kosciuszko Foundation Marcella Sembrich Voice Competition
- Finalist and Prize Winner of the Moniuszko International Voice Competition
- 2002 - Finalist, Metropolitan Opera National Council Auditions
