= Early Music Network =

Early Music Network is an international early music society. Its stated mission is: "To support and promote early music and historical performance by providing information and services which would benefit and help early music organizations, ensembles and solo musicians (such as free web hosting, instrument exchange, help with organization of concerts, to provide info about education, master classes, etc.). To help the growth of early music community on the web and in every community around the world."

Early Music Network was founded in 1998 by Predrag Gosta, and it is based in Atlanta, United States.
