= Andreas Makris =

Greek-American composer and violinist (1930–2005)

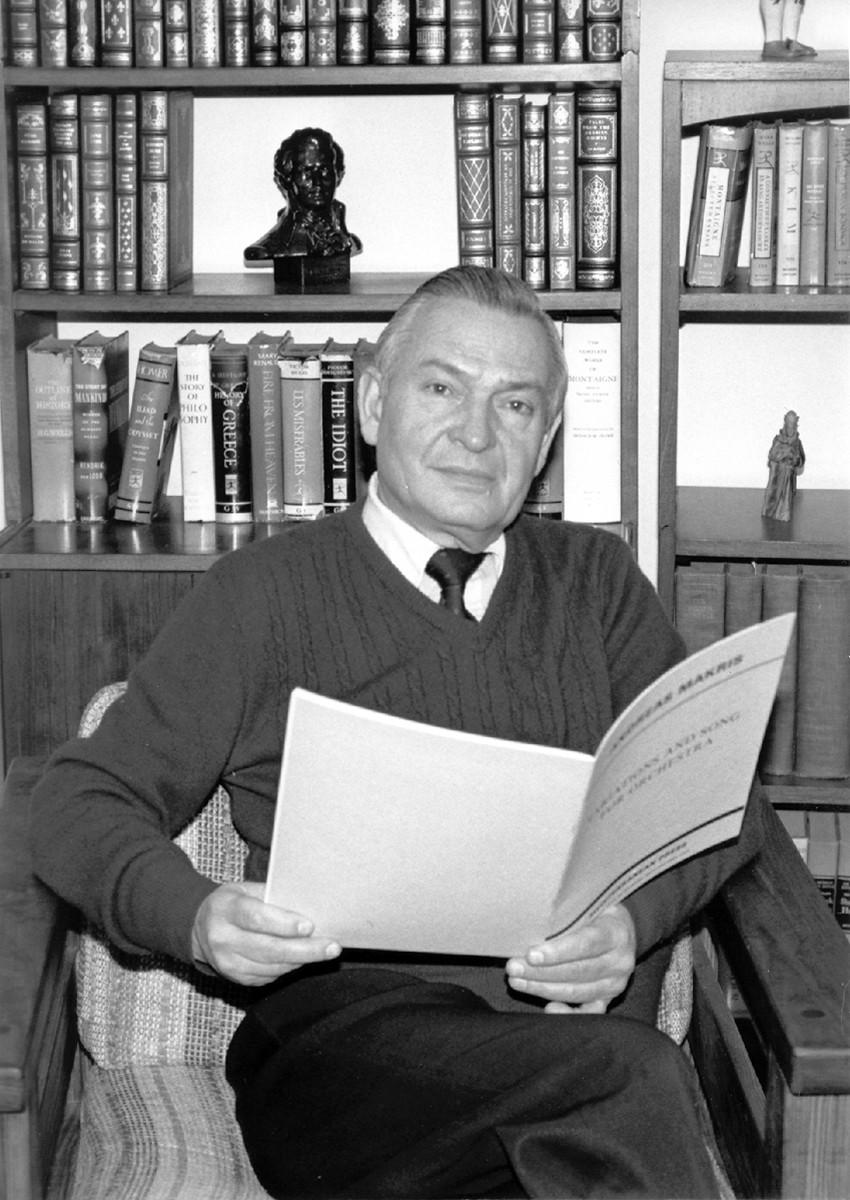
Andreas Makris, holding one of his scores, in his home

Andreas Makris (Greek: Ανδρέας Μακρής; March 7, 1930 – February 3, 2005) was a Greek-American composer and violinist, born in Kilkis, Greece, on March 7, 1930. He was a Composer-in-Residence for many years at the National Symphony Orchestra in Washington DC, working with conductors such as Howard Mitchell, Mstislav Rostropovich, Antal Dorati, and Leonard Slatkin. He composed around 100 works for orchestra, chamber ensembles, and solo instruments, including the Aegean Festival Overture, which, transcribed for concert band by Major Albert Bader of the USAF Band, became a popular piece with US bands. Grants and awards he received include the Damroch Grant, National Endowment for the Arts Grant, the Martha Baird Rockefeller Award, ASCAP Award, the Fulbright Scholarship, and citations from the Greek Government.

Makris was a member of the first violin section of the National Symphony Orchestra for 28 years. He held previous positions in the Dallas Symphony Orchestra and the Saint Louis Symphony Orchestra. His compositions have been performed in USA, South America, Canada, Europe, Russia and Japan.

He died on February 3, 2005, at his home in Silver Spring, MD. His legacy continues through the work of the Makris Foundation.

== Works ==
Works for Orchestra

- Aegean Festival Overture (1967)
- Anamnesis (1970)
- Antithesis (1995)
- Chromatokinesis (1978)
- Concerto for Strings (1966)
- Efthymía (1972)
- Fanfare for Orchestra (1973)
- Five Miniatures for String Orchestra (1972)
- Fourth of July March (1982)
- Happy Birthday Dear Lenny (1978)
- Hellenic Odyssey (2003)
- Horos from Efthymia (1972)
- In Memory (1979)
- J.F.K. Commemorative Fanfare (1995)
- Largo for Strings (1976)
- Strathmore Overture (2004) - Andreas Makris' last work
- Symphony to Youth (1989)
- Trilogy for Orchestra (1990)
- Variations and Song for Orchestra (1979)

Concertante Works

- Concertante for Violin, Cello, Clarinet, French Horn, Percussion and Orchestra (1988)
- Concertino for Organ, Flute and Strings (1992)
- Concertino for Flute (2000)
- Concertino for Trombone - for Trombone and Strings, or for Trombone and Piano (2002)
- Concertino for Violin (2000)
- Concerto Fantasia for Violin and Orchestra (1983), or for Violin and Piano (1987)
- Concerto for Viola (1970)
- Concerto for Violin for Violin and String Orchestra (1996), or for Violin and Piano (2002)
- Fantasy and Dance for Alto Saxophone and Piano (1974), Alto Saxophone, Strings and Harp (2000), or for Alto Saxophone, Winds and Harp (1977)
- Intrigues for Clarinet and Wind Ensemble (1987), for Clarinet and Orchestra (1991), or for Clarinet and Piano (c. 1991)
- Introduction and Kalamatianos (Greek Dance) for Trumpet, Strings, Snare and Bass Drums (1997)
- Japanese Song (1980)
- Moderato for 2 Violins and String Quartet or String Orchestra (1982)
- Cadenza for Mozart's Violin Concerto in G major (c. 1954)

Works for Band or Brass Ensemble

- Chromatokinesis for Symphonic Band (1982) - an arrangement of the work originally written for Orchestra
- Fanfare (1973)
- Fanfare Alexander (1980)
- Fourth of July March (1982) - an arrangement of the work originally written for Orchestra
- Grecian Sketches (c. 1970)
- Improvisations-Rhythms for Symphonic Band (1975)
- Mediterranean Holiday for Symphonic Band (1973) or for Concert Band (1974)

Chamber Works

- Armenian Medley for Violin and Piano (1973)
- Caprice Tonatonal (for Violin) (1986)
- Concertino for Solo Flute and Chamber Ensemble (2003)
- Duet for Myron and Daddy (for two violins) (1977)
- Duet for Two Violins (Little Milton on the Beach) (1965)
- Duo for Two Violins (1966)
- Greek Sonata for Violoncello and Piano (1989)
- Quartet (before 1970)
- Scherzo for Four Violins (1965)
- Sextet for Woodwind Quintet and Piano (c. 1999)
- Short Melody for Flute or For Flute (1992)
- Sonata for Violin Alone (c. 1969)
- Sonatina for Solo Violin (1997)
- String Quartet in One Movement (1970)
- Voyage Caprice (2002)
- Woodwind Quintet (1993)

Vocal Works

- A Symphony for Soprano and Strings (1992)
- Alleluia for Chorus and Brass Quintet (1990), or for Chorus and Organ or Piano (1990)
- Decalog: Singing While Learning - 10 Songs for Young Students (1995)
- Nature-Life, A Symphonic Poem (1984)
- Polychronion: Many Years for Mixed Chorus and Symphony Orchestra (1990)
- Procession (1990)
- Serenade for Soprano and Violin or A Casual Duet for 2 Voices, ala Schubert (c. 2001)
- Sirens for Soprano, Violin and Piano (1976)
- Voice Quintet (1968)

Arrangements

- 24th Caprice by Paganini, Accompaniment for Strings (c. 1990)
- Caprice for String Quartet based on a theme by Fiorillo (1986)
- Hail to the Chief after Sanderson (1981)
- Hoe-Down after Copland, for String Quartet (1977)
- La Folia by Corelli, Accompaniment for Strings (1955?)
- Midnight Bells after Heuberger/Kreisler (1985)
- Moto Perpetuo after Paganini, for Violins and Orchestra, String Quartet, or Band (1977)
- National Anthem of Greece (1978)
- National Anthem of Mexico (1979)
- Preludio for Solo Violin from Partita No. 3 in E major by J.S. Bach, Accompaniment for Strings (1982)
- Preludio for Violins and Orchestra after Partita No. 3 in E major for Solo Violin by J.S. Bach (1981)
- Variations on Popeye for String Quartet (c. 1983)
- Yankee Doodle for Solo Flute and Orchestra (1984)

Arrangements of Andreas Makris' works by others

- Aegean Festival Overture for Wind Ensemble (arr. Albert Bader, 1970)
- Alleluia for Chorus and Orchestra (arr. Piotr Gajewski, 2010)
- Viola Concerto, transcription for Viola and Piano (arr. Ivan Bozicevic, 2012)

== Notable concert premieres ==
- Aegean Festival Overture, National Symphony Orchestra, Washington DC, 1967
- Strathmore Overture, National Philharmonic, North Bethesda, MD, 2005
