= Varaždin Baroque Evenings =

Classical music festival in Varaždin, Croatia

The Varaždin Baroque Evenings (Croatian: Varaždinske barokne večeri; [ʋaraʒdiŋskɛ barɔknɛ ʋɛtʃɛri]) is a classical music festival held annually in the city of Varaždin, Croatia. The festival, first held in 1971, showcases Baroque music and is usually held in late September and early October. The majority of performances are held at various venues around Varaždin but some parts of the program also took place at churches and castles in nearby towns.

A number of Croatian and foreign soloists, opera singers, and philharmonic orchestras performed at the festival. In addition to music concerts, in recent years the festival also hosts various baroque-themed cultural events including art exhibitions, book presentations and gastronomic events. Three prizes are also awarded at the end of each festival edition: the "Ivan Lukačić Award", the "Jurica Murai Award" and the "Kantor Award".
