= Florian Deuter =

German concertmaster

Florian Deuter (born in 1965 in Mülheim) is a German violinist and conductor specializing in historical performance.

== Life and career ==
Florian Deuter studied violin in Cologne and Düsseldorf. In 1987 he joined the ensemble Musica Antiqua Köln under the direction of Reinhard Goebel, where he was concertmaster from 1994 to 2000. He has also held the position of concertmaster with ensembles and orchestras including the Gabrieli Consort under Paul McCreesh, La Chapelle Royale and the Collegium Vocale Gent under Philippe Herreweghe, and Les Musiciens du Louvre under Marc Minkowski, and has appeared as soloist and concertmaster with ensembles including the Amsterdam Baroque Orchestra under Ton Koopman, the European Baroque Orchestra, and Concerto Köln.

With Mónica Waisman, he leads the ensemble Harmonie Universelle, which he founded in 2003; they also perform as a duo.

== Discography ==
With Harmonie Universelle, Deuter has recorded works by Georg Philipp Telemann, Johann Friedrich Fasch, Johann Pachelbel, Jean-Marie Leclair, Antonio Vivaldi and Arcangelo Corelli, sonatas by Johann Sebastian Bach and cantatas by Giovanni Battista Ferrandini among others. In 2008 they released a double album of Vivaldi violin concerti. In 2018, with the soprano Dorothee Mields, they released Lass mein Herz, a recording of overtures and cantatas by Christoph Graupner.
