= Terry Barber =

American countertenor

Terry Barber is an American countertenor.

== Career ==
Barber has performed at New York City's Metropolitan Opera, Carnegie Hall, and Avery Fisher Hall, Moscow's Svetlanov Hall and London's Queen Elizabeth Hall.

He received his Bachelor of Music degree from Northwestern University and holds a Master's degree in music performance from London's Trinity College of Music.

== Discography ==
- Reflections, 1998
- Joy: A Holiday Collection, 1999
- Buddha Bar Presents Living Theater vol. 2, 2002
- Crossing the Stone, 2003
- Kapsberger & Zipoli: The Jesuit Operas, 2003
- Buddha Bar Presents Living Theater vol. 3, 2003
- Vocalise, 2004
- Purcell: Dido & Aeneas, 2004
- Dance Culture, 2005
- Simply Christmas, 2005
- Songs She Loved (Volumes I & II), 2007
- This Town, 2008
- Pergolesi: Stabat Mater, 2008
- A Sacred Journey, 2010
