= Evelyn Tubb =

British singer and early music specialist (born 1954)

Evelyn Tubb (born 1954) is an English soprano and early music specialist. She is a long-time member of The Consort of Musicke. Born on the Isle of Wight, she studied at the Guildhall School of Music and Drama from 1972 to 1976. Tubb has made many recordings and albums with lutenist/guitarist Michael Fields. She has taught at the Scola Cantorum Basiliensis in Basel, Switzerland.

== Critical reception ==
In 1993, The New York Times said about her singing the lower harmonies in 17th-century Italian love duets that "Miss Tubb's lower range has a huskiness that might be a deficit in other repertory, but which gives her readings of these pieces an unusual, expressive character".

In 1994, a Gramophone review of The Mad Lover said, "Evelyn Tubb has the skills of a virtuoso...It is also a kind of technical skill that is employed when she intentionally distorts, discolours and in other ways 'uglifies' the tone and the vocal line", noting her "intense and specific concentration on meaning".

== Discography ==
- Once I had a Sweetheart (United Classics, 1996)
- Ordo Virtutum (Etcetera Record Company BV CD 1995 KTC 1203; also VHS 1997)
- Monterverdi Duets and Solos (Regis Records, 1997)
- The Journey of Love through Life (Classicprint Records, 1999)
- Daniel Purcell: Brotherly Love (EtCetera Records, 2000)
- Monteverdi: Il ottavo libro de madrigali, 1638 Madrigali guerrieri et amorosi (Erato 5615702, 2000)
- Hildegard von Bingen In Portrait (double DVD OA 0874 D, published by BBC Opus Arte 2003)
- My Careless Eyes: Songs and Guitar Music by Fernando Sor (Gaudeamus, 2003)
- Dido and Aeneas (Edition Lilac CD, 2004)
- A Musical Hodge-Podge of English Song, 1600–1750 (Forum Records, 2007)
- The Troubadour and the Nun (Et'cetera, 2008)
- William Hayes: The Passions (Glossa, 2010)
- Pergolesi: Stabat Mater (Edition Lilac LILAC151108-2, Release Date: 2015)
