= Concerto for Two Violins (Bach) =

Concerto by Johann Sebastian Bach

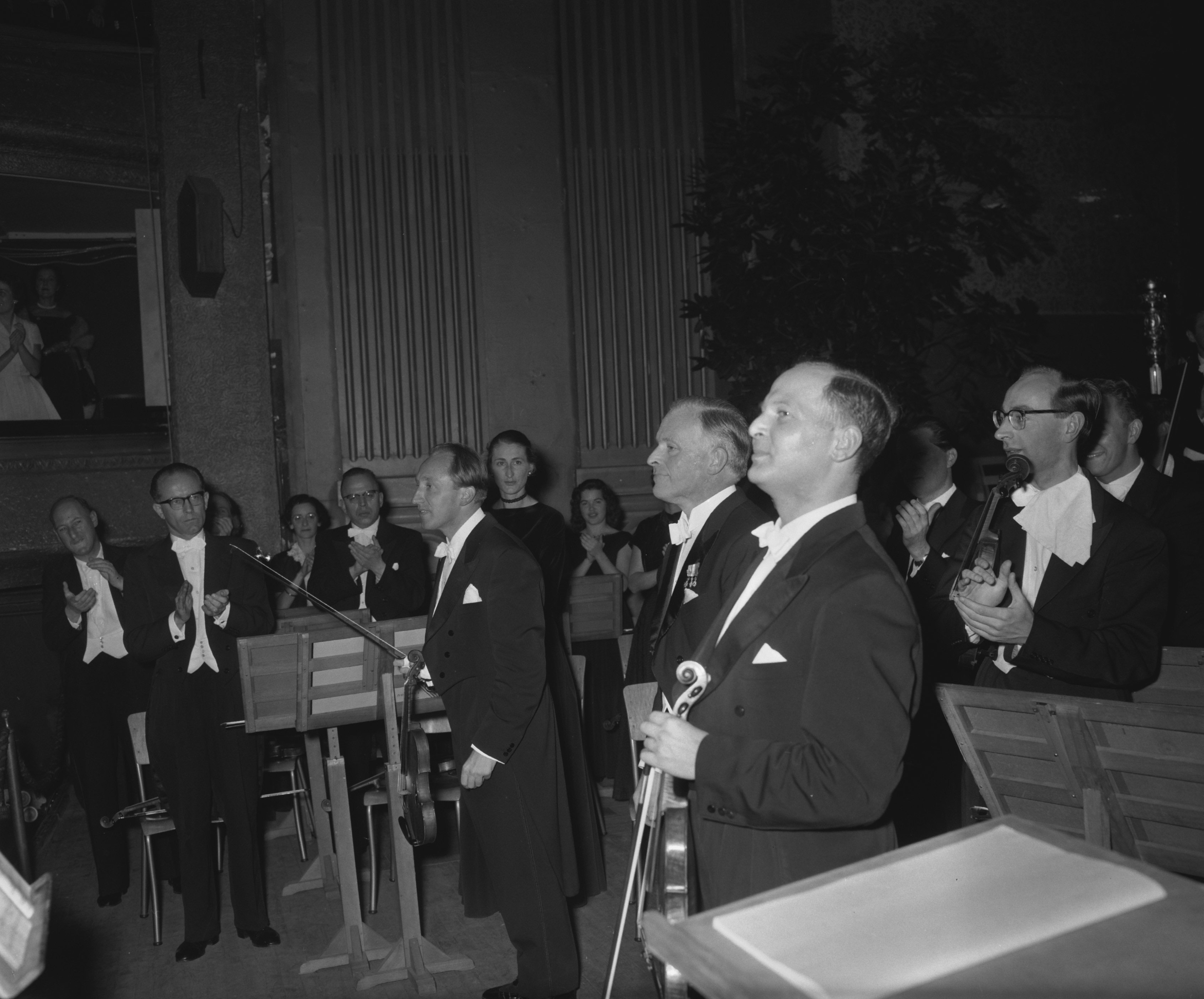
Herman Krebbers, Willem van Otterloo and Theo Olof before the Concertgebouw Orchestra (1958): in 1952, they recorded Bach's Double Concerto.

The Concerto for Two Violins in D minor, BWV 1043, also known as the Double Violin Concerto, is a violin concerto of the Late Baroque era, which Johann Sebastian Bach composed around 1730. It is one of the composer's most successful works.

== History ==
Bach composed his Concerto for Two Violins in D minor, BWV 1043, around 1730, as part of a concert series he ran as the Director of the Collegium Musicum in Leipzig. The concerto was later arranged as a concerto for two harpsichords by Bach himself as BWV 1062.

== Structure ==
Concerto for Two Violins in D minor, BWV 1043
I. Vivace

II. Largo ma non tanto

III. Allegro
Performed by the Advent Chamber Orchestra with David Perry and Roxana Pavel Goldstein (violins)

The concerto is characterized by a subtle yet expressive relationship between the violins throughout the work. In addition to the two soloists, the concerto is scored for strings (first violin, second violin and viola parts), the solo violin and basso continuo. The musical structure of this piece uses fugal imitation and much counterpoint.

The concerto comprises three movements:

1. Vivace in D minor, 4/4
2. Largo ma non tanto in F major, 12/8
3. Allegro in D minor, 3/4

Performance time of the concerto ranges from less than 13 minutes to over 18 minutes.

== Reception ==
Incipit from the first movement of the concerto

Around 1736–1737 Bach arranged the concerto for two harpsichords, transposed into C minor, BWV 1062.

1734–1738 Carl Philipp Emanuel Bach performed the concerto in Frankfurt an der Oder. After his father's death in 1750, Carl Philipp Emanuel inherited some of the original performance parts, likely doubles, of the concerto (surviving: parts for soloists and continuo), and likely also the composer's autograph score (lost). The extant original parts were later owned by Georg Poelchau, and were added to the Royal Library at Berlin (later converted to the Berlin State Library) in the 1840s. After the Second World War they were lost for several decades, eventually resurfacing in Poland.

Manuscript copies of (parts of) the concerto were produced around 1730–1740, in 1760, around 1760, around 1760–1789, and in the early 19th century. The concerto was first published in 1852, by Edition Peters, edited by Siegfried Dehn. In the first volume of his Bach biography (1873), Philipp Spitta describes the concerto as a product of the composer's Köthen period (1717–1723). After describing Bach's other extant violin concertos, those in E major (BWV 1042) and A minor (BWV 1041), he adds:

Dem D moll-Concert ist unstreitig der höchste Werth eigen und in dieser Eigenschaft findet es auch unter der heutigen musikalischen Welt schon eine erfreuliche Beachtung. Zwei Soloviolinen sind hier herangezogen, doch kann man nicht wohl von einem Doppelconcerte reden, da die beiden Geigen weniger unter sich, als vereinigt gegen den Instrumentalchor concertiren. Eine jede ist natürlich mit der Selbständigkeit behandelt, die bei dem Bachschen Stile ohne weiteres vorausgesetzt wird. Im Mittelsatze, einer wahren Perle an edlem, innigem Gesange, verhält sich das Orchester fast nur accompagnirend, wie es bei den Concertadagios ja das Gewöhnliche war.

— Philipp Spitta
Translation:

The D minor concerto is without doubt the finest of the set, and is held in due esteem by the musical world of the present day. Two solo violins are here employed, but it is not, strictly speaking, a double concerto, for the two violins play not so much against one another, as both together against the whole band. Each is treated with the independence that is a matter of course in Bach's style. In the middle movement, a very pearl of noble and expressive melody, the orchestra is used only as an accompaniment, as was usual in the adagios of concertos.

— translation (after Bell/Fuller Maitland)

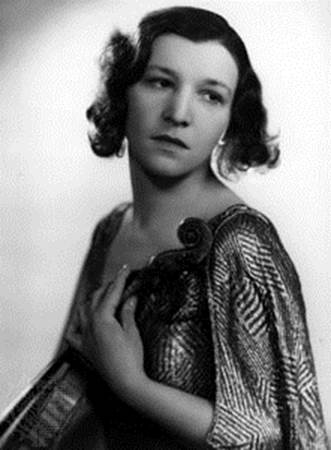
Jelly d'Arányi often played Bach's Double Concerto at the London Proms.

The Bach Gesellschaft published the concerto in 1874, edited by Wilhelm Rust. The Neue Bachgesellschaft reports around 25 known public performances of the concerto in the period from late 1904 to early 1907: most of these in Germany, but also performances in other European cities, including London, Madrid, Paris, Riga, St. Petersburg and Vienna, are mentioned. Outside of Europe, there was for instance the performance by Eugène Ysaÿe and Fritz Kreisler in New York in 1905. In London, Bach's Double became a repertoire piece, for instance regularly performed at the Proms.

After commenting that the "A minor and E major concertos are beginning to win a place in our concert halls," Albert Schweitzer writes, in the 1911 English-language edition of his book on Bach:

The concerto for two violins, in D minor, is perhaps more widely known still. It can be played at home, as its orchestral part can be easily transcribed for the piano. Every amateur should know the wonderful peace of the largo ma non tanto in F major.

— Albert Schweitzer

Johannes Umbreit's piano reduction of the orchestral score was published by Henle.

Research by Andreas Glöckner, published in 1982, dispelled prior assumptions that Bach would have composed the concerto in Köthen: Bach's extant autograph parts indicate that the concerto was composed in Leipzig, likely in 1730 or the earlier part of 1731. The New Bach Edition published the concerto in 1986, edited by Dietrich Kilian. According to Peter Wollny, writing in 1999, "The Concerto for two violins in D minor BWV 1043 is today one of the best-known and most frequently performed works of the composer, above all by virtue of its soulful, song-like middle movement."

According to Michael Miller, writing for Penguin's Complete Idiot's Guides, the concerto is one of Bach's eleven most notable compositions. In the Rough Guides, the Double Concerto is described as "one of Bach's very greatest works." The BBC website describes the concerto as "one of Bach's best loved instrumental works." According to the British Classic FM website, "the 'Bach Double' is one of the most famous of his works." The uDiscover Music website lists it among ten essential pieces by the composer.

== Recordings ==
Recordings of the concerto include:

Recordings of BWV 1043
Rec.	Soloist I	Soloist II	Orchestra	Conductor	Release
1915-01-04	Kreisler	Zimbalist	string quartet (cello: Bourdon)	Rogers	Naxos (2001)
1924-04-10	Catterall	Bridge, J. S.	Hallé Orchestra	Harty	Columbia (1925)
≤1926-02	Arányi	Fachiri	[unidentified]	Chapple, S.	Vocalion (1926)
1928	Rosé, Ar.	Rosé, Al.	Rosé Quartet		Biddulph (1928)
1928-07-01	Rosengren, A.	Witek	Bayreuth orchestra members	Schmidt	Columbia (1929)
1932-06-04	Menuhin	Enescu	Paris Symphony Orchestra	Monteux	Vocalion (2010)
1935-06-24	Zimmermann	Hallmann, F.	Concertgebouw Orchestra	Mengelberg	History XXCM (2001)
1937-08-30	Szigeti	Flesch	[unidentified]	Goehr	Naxos (2009)
1939	Diener	Hampe, C.	Collegium musicum	Diener	Electrola (≥1939)
c. 1945	Bruun	Koppel	Danish Chamber Orchestra	Wöldike, M.	His Master's Voice (c. 1945)
1945-04–05	Busch	Magnes	Busch Chamber Players		CBS (1975)
1945-11	Menuhin	Oistrakh, D.	USSR State Symphony Orchestra	Orlov	Warner (2016)
1946	Menuhin	Oistrakh, D.	Moscow Chamber Orchestra	Barshai	Doremi (2000)
1946-03-27	Grumiaux	Pougnet	Philharmonia String Orchestra	Susskind	Columbia (1946)
1946-10	Heifetz		RCA Victor Chamber Orchestra	Waxman	Naxos (2008)
1950-06	Stern	Schneider	Prades Festival Orchestra	Casals	Cascavelle (2003)
1952-01-06	Krebbers	Olof	Concertgebouw Orchestra	Van Otterloo	Philips (1998)
1953-09-15	Menuhin	de Vito	Philharmonia Orchestra	Bernard	His Master's Voice (1954)
1955	Grehling	Hendel, G. F.	Saar Chamber Orchestra	Ristenpart	Forgotten Records (2008)
1955	Gilels	Kogan, L.	Philharmonia Orchestra	Ackermann	Columbia (1956)
1955-04	Erlih	Merckel	Pro Arte München	Redel	Forgotten Records (2009)
1956	Barchet	Beh, W.	Pro Musica Stuttgart	Davisson	Vox (1956)
1956-12-12	Schneiderhan	Baumgartner	Lucerne Festival Strings	Baumgartner	DG (2005)
≤1957	Cron, M.	Hoffer, P.	Orchestre Isaïe Disenhaus	Disenhaus, I.	GEM (1957)
1957-04-17	Oistrakh, D.	Oistrakh, I.	Gewandhaus Orchestra	Konwitschny	Berlin Classics (2016)
≤1958	Michelucci	Ayo	I Musici		Philips (1958)
1958	Menuhin	Oistrakh, D.	RTF Chamber Orchestra	Capdevielle	Medici.tv (video: 2001)
1958-09-18	Oistrakh, D.	Menuhin	Enescu Philharmonic Orchestra	Georgescu	Music & Arts (2000)
1959	Kogan, L.	Gilels	Moscow Chamber Orchestra	Barshai	ICA (2015)
1959-07-08	Menuhin	Ferras	Bath Festival Orchestra	Menuhin	EMI (2009)
≤1960	Lautenbacher	Vorholz, D.	Mainzer Kammerorchester	Kehr	Vox (1960)
1960	Oistrakh, D.	Oistrakh, I.	Moscow Chamber Orchestra	Barshai	Le Chant du Monde (1988)
1960-06	Carmirelli	Peinemann	Munich Philharmonic	Rieger	Past Daily (2015)
≤1961	Frasca-Colombier	Garnier, L.	Kuentz Chamber Orchestra	Kuentz	Pierre Verany (1994)
1961-02	Oistrakh, D.	Oistrakh, I.	Royal Philharmonic	Goossens	DG (1996)
1961-02-18	Oistrakh, D.	Oistrakh, I.	English Chamber Orchestra	Davis	ICA Classics (video: 2011)
1961-05	Heifetz	Friedman	London Symphony Orchestra	Sargent	Sony (2008)
1963-01–02	Büchner	Guntner	Münchener Bach-Orchester	Richter	Archiv (1990)
1963-04-30	Peinemann	Zanettovich	Naples RAI chamber orch.	Abbado	Fonit Cetra (1995)
1964-03	Milstein	Morini	[unnamed chamber orchestra]	Milstein	Universal (2016)
1965-05	Szeryng	Rybar	Musikkollegium Winterthur	Szeryng	Philips (2005)
1965-09	Suk	Jásek	Prague Symphony Orchestra	Smetáček	Supraphon (1989)
≤1966	Krebbers	Olof	Amsterdams Kamerorkest	Rieu sr.	Sony (1994)
1966	Ferras	Schwalbé	Berlin Philharmonic	Karajan	DG (2007)
1967	Varga, T.	Varga, G.	Varga Festival Chamber Orch.	Varga, T.	Claves (1993)
1967-01	Harnoncourt, A.	Pfeiffer, W.	Concentus Musicus Wien	Harnoncourt, N.	Telefunken (1967)
1968	Oistrakh, D.	Oistrakh, I.	Moscow Chamber Orchestra	Barshai	Melodia (2014)
1970-09	Grumiaux	Toyoda	New Philharmonia Orchestra	De Waart	Philips (1971)
≤1971	Milanova, S.	Badev, G.	Sofia Chamber Orchestra	Kazandjiev	Harmonia Mundi (1971)
1971	Kogan, L.	Kogan, P.	Moscow Radio Symph. Orch.		Melodia (2014)
1971-01	Melkus	Rantos, S.	Capella Academica Wien	Melkus	DG (1971)
1971-07	Perlman	Zukerman	English Chamber Orchestra	Barenboim	EMI (2002)
1971-07	Francescatti	Pasquier	Lucerne Festival Strings	Baumgartner	DG (2006)
1972-02-26	Szeryng	García	English Chamber Orchestra	Szeryng	Inta'glio (1992)
≤1974	Kalafusz, H.	Rösch, W.	Stuttgarter Kammerorchester		MHS (1974)
1974	Krachmalnick, J.	Menuhin	National ASTA String Orchestra	Krachmalnick, S.	Custom Fidelity (1974)
1975-5	Magyar, T.	Goldberg	Netherlands Chamber Orchestra	Goldberg	Philips (1999)
1975-09-20	Kamu	Segerstam	Nationalmuseum orchestra	Génetay	BIS (1995)
1976-05-18	Menuhin	Stern	New York Philharmonic	Bernstein	Sony (1991)
1976-06	Szeryng	Hasson	St Martin in the Fields	Marriner	Philips (1982)
1977–78	Suske	Kröhner, G.	Gewandhaus Orchestra	Masur	Deutsche Schallplatten (1980)
1978-11	Grumiaux	Krebbers	Les Solistes Romands	Gérecz	Philips (1980)
≤1979	Kovács	Bálint, M.	Budapest Philharmonic	Erdélyi	Hungaroton (1979)
1979-03	Altenburger	Mayer-Schierning, E.	Deutsche Bachsolisten	Winschermann	RCA (1980)
1979-03-03	Menuhin	Ricci	Winnipeg Symphony Orchestra	Gamba	MMG (1980)
1980-09-24	Perlman	Stern	New York Philharmonic	Mehta	Sony (2004)
1981	Kuijken	Van Dael	La Petite Bande	Kuijken	Deutsche Harm. Mundi (1996)
1981	Schröder	Hirons, C.	Academy of Ancient Music	Hogwood	L'Oiseau-Lyre (1989)
1981-11-12	Menuhin	Li	London Symphony Orchestra	Menuhin	His Master's Voice (1982)
≤1982	Stern	Zukerman	St. Paul Chamber Orchestra	Zukerman	CBS (1987)
1982	Suk	Kosina, M.	Suk Chamber Orchestra	Vlach	Supraphon (1991)
1982-11-17	Mutter	Accardo	English Chamber Orchestra	Accardo	EMI (1983)
1982-12	Stern	Mintz	Israel Philharmonic Orchestra	Mehta	Helicon (2014)
≤1983	Kremer		St Martin in the Fields	Kremer	Philips (2003)
1983-3	Standage	Wilcock, E.	The English Concert	Pinnock	Archiv (2001)
≤1984	Divry, T.	Velin, J.-C.	Ad artem de Lorraine	Redel	Forlane (1992)
1984-01	Shumsky	Tunnell, J.	Scottish Chamber Orchestra		Nimbus (2001)
1984-04-27	Menuhin	Chen, L.	Polish Chamber Orchestra	Menuhin	Polskie Nagrania (1988)
1984-12-20	Tretiakov	Kagan	Moscow Virtuosi	Tretiakov	Yedang (2001)
≤1985	Laredo	Tunnell, J.	Scottish Chamber Orchestra	Laredo	Contour (1985)
1985	Huggett	Bury, A.	Amsterdam Baroque Orchestra	Koopman	Erato (1988)
1985-07	Accardo	Batjer, M.	Chamber Orchestra of Europe	Accardo	Philips (1986)
1985-12	Menuhin	Lysy	Camerata Lysy Gstaad	Lysy	EMI (1987)
≤1986	Kostyál, K.	Rolla	Franz Liszt Chamber Orchestra	Rolla	Hungaroton (1986)
1986-03	Zukerman	Midori	St. Paul Chamber Orchestra	Zukerman	Philips (1986)
1986-06	Ritchie	Quan, L.	Helicon	Fuller	Reference (1993)
≤1986-07	Spivakov	Futer, A.	Moscow Virtuosi	Spivakov	Castle (1986)
≤1987	Sitkovetsky, D.	García	English Chamber Orchestra	Sitkovetsky, D.	Novalis (1987)
1987-12-02	Eto	Gulli	English Chamber Orchestra	Menuhin	Start Records (1988)
≤1988	Brezina, J.	Elias, F.	Camerata Romana	Duvier, E.	Pilz Media Group (1988)
1988-07	Spivakov	Futer, A.	Moscow Virtuosi	Spivakov	RCA Victor (1990)
1988-11	Bride, P.	Crenne, C.	Ensemble Instrumental de Fr.		Pierre Verany (1994)
1989-05	Mackintosh	Wallfisch	The King's Consort	King	Hyperion (1990)
1989-05–06	Nishizaki	Jablokov, A.	Cappella Istropolitana	Dohnányi	Naxos (1990)
1989-07	Agostini	Perez, A.	I Musici		Philips (1990)
1990	Rees	Murdoch, J.	Scottish Ensemble	Rees	Virgin (1991)
1990-04-15	Korsakova	Korsakov	Concertino of Moscow Phil.		Russian Disc (1993)
1990-09	Zukerman	García	English Chamber Orchestra	Zukerman	RCA Victor (2007)
1991	Spivakov	Futer, A.	Moscow Virtuosi	Spivakov	Cascade (Video: 2003)
1992-09-01	Menuhin	Lysy	Camerata Lysy Gstaad	Menuhin	Dinemec (1997)
≤1993	Zweden	Verhey	Pardubice Chamber Orchestra	Vermeulen, J.	Dino (1993)
1993	Weiss, L.	Sand, M.	Arcangeli Baroque Strings	Sand, M.	Music & Arts (1995)
1994	Letzbor	Sepec, D.	Ars Antiqua Austria	Letzbor	Symphonia (2010)
1994-09	Colliard, G.	Lethiec, S.	Brixi Chamber Orchestra	Meister, C.	Doron Music (1995)
1995-02	Lamon	Melsted, L.	Tafelmusik	Lamon	Sony (1995)
1995-02	Hudeček	Sitkovetsky, D.	Virtuosi di Praga	Sitkovetsky, D.	Supraphon (1996)
1995-05	Standage	Comberti	Collegium Musicum 90	Standage	Chandos (1996)
1996	Manze	Podger	Academy of Ancient Music	Manze	Harmonia Mundi (1997)
1996	Schmid	Rosenkranz, H.	Cis Coll. Mozarteum Salzburg	Geise, J.	Arte Nova (2000)
1996-12-26	Stern	Shaham	Israel Philharmonic Orchestra		BMG (video: 1997)
1997-06	Röhrig, A.	Bundies, U.	Musica Alta Ripa		MD&G (1998)
1998-12	Pichlmeier, C.	Stewart, L.	Kölner Kammerorchester	Müller-Brühl	Naxos (1999)
≤1999	Lysy	Reuter	Camerata Lysy Gstaad	Menuhin	Arcobaleno (2000)
1999	Poppen	Faust	Bach-Collegium Stuttgart	Rilling	Hänssler (1999)
1999	Terakado	Wakamatsu, N.	Bach Collegium Japan	Suzuki	BIS (2000)
≤2000	Polack, D.	Drzyzgula, K.	Lodz Chamber Orchestra	Szostak	Brilliant Classics (2000)
2000-09	St. John, L.	St. John, S.	New York Bach Ensemble		Avie (2002)
2000-01	Kennedy	Stabrawa	Berlin Philharmonic		EMI (2001)
2000-10	Hahn	Batjer, M.	Los Angeles Chamber Orchestra	Kahane	DG (2003)
2001	Hudson, B.	Kussmaul, W.	Stuttgarter Kammerorchester	Hudson, B.	Tacet (2006)
2001	Kuusisto, J.	Kuusisto, P.	Tapiola Sinfonietta		Ondine (2010)
2003	Ingólfsdóttir, U.	Ingólfsdóttir, R.	Reykjavík Chamber Orchestra		Smekkleysa (2013)
2003-06	Valetti	Beyer	Café Zimmermann	Valetti	Alpha (2014)
2005	Suwanai	Steude, V.	Chamber Orchestra of Europe	Suwanai	Philips (2006)
2005	Tognetti	Rathbone	Australian Chamber Orchestra	Tognetti	ABC Classics (2009)
2005-01-24	Beznosiuk	Podger	Academy of Ancient Music	Beznosiuk	Wigmore Hall (2006)
2005-02-26	Großbauer	Buchler, W.	Vienna Symphony ensemble	Birnbaum, C.	Solo Musica (2013)
2005-10–11	Hope	Blankestijn	Chamber Orchestra of Europe	Bezuidenhout	Warner (2006)
2005-12	Szilvay, R.	Simonen	Helsinki Strings	Szilvay, G.	Warner (2010)
2006-01-19	Rowland	Koch, M.	London Conchord Ensemble		Champ Hill (2010)
2006-06-25	Bezzina	Corolla, L.	Ensemble baroque de Nice	Bezzina	Ligia Digital (2010)
2008-06	Fischer	Sitkovetsky, A.	St Martin in the Fields	Fischer	Decca (2009)
≤2009	Sato	Fukuhara, M.	Orchestra of St. Luke's		MusicMasters (2009)
2009-01	Kristinsdóttir	Immer, L.	Solistenensemble Kaleidoskop		ARS (2011)
2009-10-17	Oliveira	Gruesser	Arco Ensemble	Oliveira	Artek (2010)
≤2010	Morton, J.	Gould	Scottish Ensemble	Morton, J.	BBC (2010)
2010-11-26	Solozobova	Zimansky	Camerata Musica Barocca	Solozobova	Bella Musica (2011)
2011	Meyers		English Chamber Orchestra	Mercurio	eOne (2012)
2011-03–04	Spissky, P.	Eike	Concerto Copenhagen	Mortensen	cpo (2015)
2011-10	Zimmermann	Gilbert	New York Philharmonic	Gilbert	NYPO (2012)
2012	Tölke, B.	Kanzian, M.	Ensemble Wien Klang	Schulz, C.	Preiser (2014)
2012-04	von der Goltz	Müllejans	Freiburger Barockorchester		Harmonia Mundi (2013)
2012-05	Eschkenazy	Top	Concertgebouw Chamber Orch.		Pentatone (2012)
2012-10	Podger	Čičić, B.	Brecon Baroque	Podger	Channel Classics (2013)
2013-06-14	Debretzeni	Homburger	English Baroque Soloists	Gardiner	BBC (2013)
2013-03	Koh	Laredo	Curtis 20/21 Ensemble	Parameswaran, V.	Cedille (2014)
2013-07	Hirasaki	Carmignola	Concerto Köln		Archiv (2014)
2014-07	Nemtanu, S.	Nemtanu, D.	Paris Chamber Orchestra	Goetzel	Naïve (2015)
2014-11	Bernardini	Daniel, H.	Dunedin Consort	Butt	Linn (2016)
2015-02	Westers, J.	Webb, A.	Camerata RCO		Gutman Records (2017)
2015-08	Mutter	Wildschut	Mutter's Virtuosi	Esfahani	DG (2015)
2016-03–06	Radulović	Milošević	Double Sens		DG (2016)
2016-06	Korsakova	Padovani	North Czech Philharmonic	Olivieri-Munroe	ARS (2019)
2016-10-07	Sato	Deans, E.	Netherlands Bach Society	Sato	Bachvereniging (video: 2017)
2017–2018	Faust	Forck, B.	Akademie für Alte Musik Berlin	Forck, B.	Harmonia Mundi (2019)
2018-02	Sato	Valova, Z.	Il Pomo d'Oro		Erato (2018)
≤2019	Kalló	Paulik, L.	Capella Savaria	Kalló	Hungaroton (2019)

== In choreography ==
Neoclassical choreographer George Balanchine created the ballet Concerto Barocco to the Concerto in D minor for two violins, with two principal female dancers each following one of the instrumental soloists and the corps following the orchestra. Modern dance choreographer Paul Taylor used the second and third movements of Bach's Concerto in D minor (as well as the entire Violin Concerto in E Major) as the music for Esplanade, a dance "based on pedestrian movement".

== Sources ==
By title:

- "Bach - Concerto in D minor for Two Violins". Classic FM (UK).
- "Best Bach Works: 10 Essential Pieces By The Great Composer". uDiscover Music. Universal Music Group. 1 March 2019.
- "Concerto, c BWV 1062". Bach Digital. Leipzig: Bach Archive; et al. 16 April 2020.
- "Concerto, d BWV 1043". Bach Digital. Leipzig: Bach Archive; et al. 15 April 2020.
- "D-Bhm H 729". Bach Digital. Leipzig: Bach Archive; et al. 3 October 2018.
- "D-B Mus.ms. Bach P 254". Bach Digital. Leipzig: Bach Archive; et al. 4 March 2020.
- "D-B Mus.ms. Bach St 147". Bach Digital. Leipzig: Bach Archive; et al. 4 March 2020.
- "D-B Mus.ms. Bach St 630". Bach Digital. Leipzig: Bach Archive; et al. 12 January 2020.
- "PL-Kj Mus.ms. Bach St 148, Fascicle 1". Bach Digital. Leipzig: Bach Archive; et al. 7 February 2020.
- "PL-Kj Mus.ms. Bach St 148, Fascicle 2". Bach Digital. Leipzig: Bach Archive; et al. 7 February 2020.
- "Übersicht der Aufführungen J. S. Bachscher Werke von Ende 1904 bis Anfang 1907" [Overview of the performances of works by J. S. Bach from the end of 1904 to early 1907]. Bach-Jahrbuch 1906 [Bach Yearbook 1906]. Bach-Jahrbuch (in German). Vol. 3. Breitkopf & Härtel. 1906. pp. 115–129. doi:10.13141/bjb.v1906 – via Qucosa.

By author:

- Dehn, Siegfried, ed. (1852). Concerto en Ré mineur pour Deux Violons Principaux Avec Accompagnement De deux Violons, Viola et Basse composé Par Jean Sebastien Bach: publié pour la première fois d'après le manuscrit original des parties principaux et du Continuo (in French). C. F. Peters. No. 231 (Plate 3394).
- Dürr, Alfred; Neumann, Werner, eds. (1968). "Verzeichnis der seit Erscheinen der ersten Bach-Gesamtausgabe verschollenen Originalhandschriften Bachscher Werke" [Catalogue of Bach's original manuscripts which went lost after the first complete edition of Bach's works]. Bach-Jahrbuch 1968 [Bach Yearbook 1968]. Bach-Jahrbuch (in German). Vol. 54. Neue Bachgesellschaft. Berlin: Evangelische Verlagsanstalt (published 1969). pp. 101–103. doi:10.13141/bjb.v1968 – via Qucosa.
- Glöckner, Andreas (1982). "Neuerkenntnisse zu Johann Sebastian Bachs Aufführungskalender zwischen 1729 und 1735" [New insights on Johann Sebastian Bach's performance calendar from 1729 to 1735]. In Schulze, Hans-Joachim; Wolff, Christoph (eds.). Bach-Jahrbuch 1981 [Bach Yearbook 1981]. Bach-Jahrbuch (in German). Vol. 67. Neue Bachgesellschaft. Berlin: Evangelische Verlagsanstalt. pp. 43–76. doi:10.13141/bjb.v1981. ISSN 0084-7682 – via Qucosa.
- Kennaway, George William (April 2009). Cello Techniques and Performing Practices in the Nineteenth and Early Twentieth Centuries (PDF) (Thesis). University of Leeds.
- Kilian, Dietrich, ed. (1986). "Konzert für 2 Violinen, Streicher und Basso continuo d-moll, BWV 1043". Konzerte für Violine, für zwei Violinen, für Cembalo, Flöte und Violine [Concertos for Violin, for two Violins, for Cembalo, Flute and Violin]. New Bach Edition (in German). Vol. VII, 3 (Score). Johann Sebastian Bach Institute, Bach Archive. Bärenreiter. pp. V–VI, 71ff. ISMN 9790006463169. BA 5065-01.
- Miller, Michael (2008). "Bach's Musical Legacy". The Complete Idiot's Guide to Music History: From Pre-Historic Africa to Classical Europe to American Popular Music. Complete Idiot's Guides. Penguin. ISBN 9781440636370.
- Potter, Tully; et al. (2009). BACH, J.S. / TARTINI: Violin Concertos (Szigeti) (1937-1954) (liner notes). Naxos. 8.110979 – via Chandos website.
- Rust, Wilhelm, ed. (1874). Joh. Seb. Bach's Kammermusik; Vierter Band: Concerte für Violine mit Orchesterbegleitung [J. S. Bach's chamber music; Fourth volume: concertos for violin with orchestral accompaniment]. Johann Sebastian Bach's Werke (in German). Vol. 21. Bach Gesellschaft. Leipzig: Breitkopf & Härtel. pp. XVII–XVIII, 39–62.
- Schweitzer, Albert (1935) [1911]. J. S. Bach. Vol. I. Translated by Newman, Ernest (Reprint ed.). London: A. & C. Black. p. 416.
- Spitta, Philipp (1873). Johann Sebastian Bach (in German). Vol. I. Leipzig: Breitkopf & Härtel. pp. 733–735.
- Spitta, Philipp (1899). Johann Sebastian Bach: His Work and Influence on the Music of Germany, 1685–1750. Vol. II. Translated by Bell, Clara; Fuller Maitland, John Alexander. Novello & Co. pp. 125–128.
- Staines, Joe, ed. (2010). The Rough Guide to Classical Music (5th ed.). Rough Guides. p. 24. ISBN 9781848366770.
- Wolff, Christoph (2002). Johann Sebastian Bach: The Learned Musician. Oxford University Press. p. 357. ISBN 9780199248841.
- Wollny, Peter (1996). "Zur Überlieferung der Instrumentalwerke Johann Sebastian Bachs: Der Quellenbesitz Carl Philipp Emanuel Bachs" [On the transmission of instrumental compositions by Johann Sebastian Bach: the sources owned by Carl Philipp Emanuel Bach]. In Schulze, Hans-Joachim; Wolff, Christoph (eds.). Bach-Jahrbuch 1996 [Bach Yearbook 1996]. Bach-Jahrbuch (in German). Vol. 82. Neue Bachgesellschaft. Leipzig: Evangelische Verlagsanstalt. pp. 7–21. doi:10.13141/bjb.v1996. ISBN 3-374-01630-8. ISSN 0084-7682 – via Qucosa.
- Wollny, Peter; et al. (1999). BACH, J.S.: Violin Concertos, BWV 1041-1043 and BWV 1052 (liner notes). Translated by Loos, Diana. Naxos. 8.554603 – via Chandos website.
