= Kuusisto (surname) =

Kuusisto is a Finnish surname. As of 2013, there are more than 10,000 Finnish people registered with this surname.

== Notable people ==
Some notable people with this surname include:

- Ilkka Kuusisto (1933–2025), Finnish opera composer, conductor, choirmaster and organist
- Jaakko Kuusisto (1974–2022), Finnish violinist and composer, son of Ilkka Kuusisto
- Jarmo Kuusisto (born 1961), Finnish ice hockey player
- Jesse-Juho Kuusisto (born 1991), Finnish football player
- Mika Kuusisto (born 1967), Finnish cross country skier
- Pekka Kuusisto (born 1976), Finnish violinist, son of Ilkka Kuusisto
- Stephen Kuusisto (born 1955), American poet
- Taneli Kuusisto (1905–1988), Finnish composer, music critic, teacher and choir leader, father of Ilkka Kuusisto
- Timo Kuusisto (born 1959), Finnish pole vaulter
