= Rakastava =

1912 suite by Jean Sibelius

- Suite by Jean Sibelius
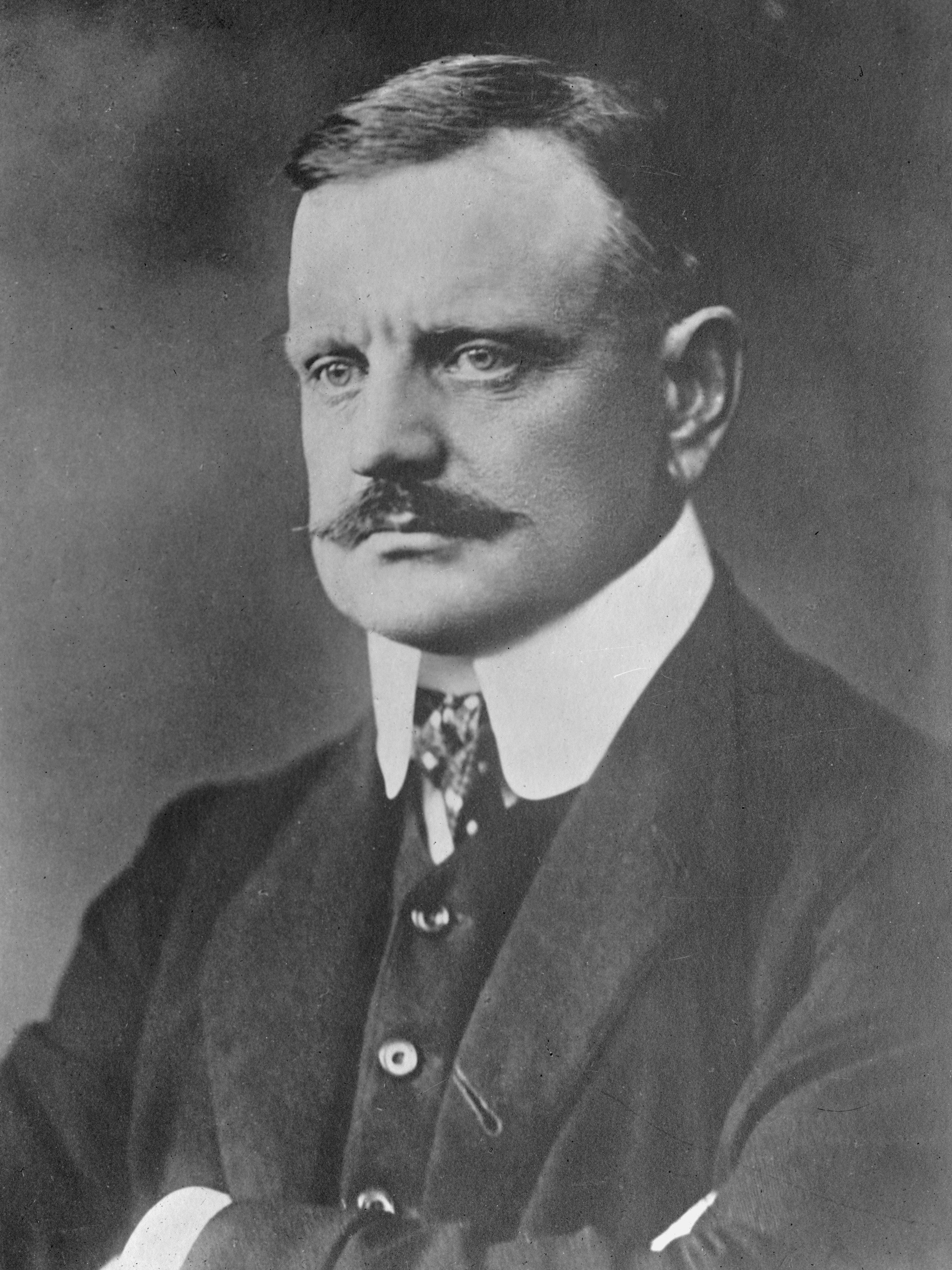
- The composer in 1913
- Opus: 14
- Composed: 1912
- Movements: 3
- Scoring: string orchestra; percussion; triangle

Rakastava
- Choral composition by Jean Sibelius
- Composed: 1894 (men's chorus); 1894 (men's chorus and string orchestra); 1898 (mixed chorus)
- Movements: 4
- Scoring: men's chorus (1894); men's chorus and string orchestra (1894); mixed chorus (1898)

Rakastava (The Lover), Op. 14, is a suite by Jean Sibelius. He completed it in 1912, scored for string orchestra, percussion and triangle. He based it on his earlier composition of the same title, a song cycle of four movements for men's chorus a cappella completed in 1894. The works are based on a Finnish text in Book 1 of the Kanteletar.

== History ==
In 1894, Sibelius completed Rakastava, a cycle of four a cappella songs for men's chorus on a Finnish text in Book 1 of the collection of Finnish folk poems, the Kanteletar. He first set it in 1894, as an entry for a local competition. He won the second prize, while the first prize went to his former teacher. Sibelius arranged the cycle for men's chorus and string orchestra in 1894, and for mixed choir in 1898.

Sibelius used the cycle as the basis for the orchestral suite Rakastava for string orchestra, percussion and triangle, to which he assigned the opus number 14. He completed it in 1912, when he also wrote his Fourth Symphony. Sibelius often conducted the suite together with his symphonies because the piece "captivated audiences".

== Music ==
=== Structure of the song cycle ===
1. Missä armahani
2. Armahan kulku
3. Hyvää iltaa lintuseni

=== Structure of the suite ===
1. Rakastava, Andante con moto (common time, D minor)
2. Rakastetun tie (The way of the lover), Allegretto (3/4, B♭ major)
3. Hyvää iltaa ... Jää hyvästi (Good evening, farewell), Andantino (cut time, F major & D minor)

In the first movement, the strings sound light and beautiful. The choral part of the second movement was changed to "murmurs on the strings and wonderfully flexible melodic progressions." The third movement is deeply emotional as its model.

== Discography ==
The sortable table below contains other commercially available recordings of orchestral version of Rakastava:

No.	Conductor	Ensemble	Rec. (Note: Refers to the year in which the performers recorded the work; this may not be the same as the year in which the recording was first released to the general public.)	Time	Recording venue	Label	Ref.
1	Leslie Heward	Leslie Howard String Orchestra	1941	10:38	Birmingham Town Hall	His Master's Voice	(Note: L. Heward–HMV (E 2904621) 1985)
2	Franz Litschauer	Vienna State Opera Orchestra	c. 1952	?	?	Vanguard	(Note: F. Litschauer–Vanguard (VRS–430) 1952)
3	Arthur Winograd	Arthur Winograd String Orchestra	c. 1956	?	?	MGM	(Note: A. Winograd–MGM (E–3332) 1956)
4	Gennady Rozhdestvensky	U.S.S.R. State Radio and TV Symphony Orchestra	1962	12:48	?	Yedang Classics	(Note: G. Rozhdestvensky–Yedang Classics (CT–10059) 2001)
5	Leslie Jones	The Little Orchestra of London	c. 1969	11:45	?	Unicorn-Kanchana	(Note: L. Jones—Unicorn-Kanchana (UKCD 2047) 1991)
6	Leo Berlin	Stockholm Philharmonic Chamber Ensemble	1969	11:44	Studio 4, Swedish Radio	Swedish Society Discofil	(Note: L. Berlin–Swedish Society Discofil (SCD 1047) 2001)
7	Sir John Barbirolli	Hallé Orchestra	1969	12:54	Kingsway Hall	EMI Classics	(Note: J. Barbirolli–EMI Classics (7243 5 67299 2 6) 2000)
8	Alois Springer	Hamburg Symphony	c. 1971	12:39	?	Allegria	(Note: A. Springer–Allegria (221025–205) 2003)
9	Leif Segerstam	Helsingin kamariorkesteri	1974	11:33	Sibelius Academy	BIS	(Note: L. Segerstam—BIS (CD–180) 1993)
10	Paavo Pohjola	Espoo Chamber Orchestra	1977	11:44	Finlandia Hall; Meilahti Church (Note: The liner notes to this release list both venues without further specification (i.e., track-by-track).)	Espoo Records	(Note: P. Pohjola–Espoo Records (ESP–001) 1977)
11	Sir Neville Marriner	Academy of St Martin in the Fields	1977	10:47	Kingsway Hall	Argo	(Note: N. Marriner–Argo (417 132–2) 1986)
12	Sir Alexander Gibson	Scottish National Orchestra	1977	12:16	Motherwell Town Hall	Chandos	(Note: A. Gibson—Chandos (CHAN 8393) 1985)
13	Nicolas Flagello	Orchestra da Camera di Roma	c. 1977	?	?	Peters International	(Note: N. Flagello–Peters International (PLE 087) 1971)
14	Roland Douatte	Radio-Tele-Luxembourg Symphony Orchestra	c. 1982	12:06	?	Valintatalo	(Note: R. Douatte–Valintatalo (VLP 13) 1982)
15	Neeme Järvi	Gothenburg Symphony Orchestra	1985	15:01	Gothenburg Concert Hall	BIS	(Note: N. Järvi–BIS (CD–312) 1986)
16	William Boughton	English String Orchestra	1988	10:50	Great Hall, University of Birmingham	Nimbus	(Note: W. Boughton–Nimbus (NI7716/7) 2000)
17	Adrian Leaper	Cappella Istropolitana	1989	12:53	Moyzes Hall, Bratislava	Naxos	(Note: A. Leaper–Naxos (8.550330) 1990)
18	Juhani Lamminmäki	Tapiola Sinfonietta	1989	11:01	Tapiola Hall, Espoo Cultural Centre	Finlandia	(Note: J. Lamminmäki–Finlandia (4509–95859–2) 1991)
19	Heikki Rautasalo	Vox Artis Chamber Orchestra	1990	10:35	Tapiola Hall, Espoo Cultural Centre	Vox Artis	(Note: H. Rautasalo–Vox Artis (VACD 001) 1990)
20	Paavo Berglund	Finnish Chamber Orchestra	1991	?	Tampere Hall	FCO	(Note: P. Berglund–FCO (FCO 1001) 1991)
21	Mario Bernardi	CBC Vancouver Orchestra	1992	11:05	Orpheum	CBC Records	(Note: M. Bernardi–CBC (SMCD 5157) 1996)
22	Richard Rintoul	Colburn Chamber Orchestra	1992	12:53	Bridges Hall of Music	Ambassador	(Note: R. Rintoul–Ambassador (ARC 1009) 1993)
23	Csaba & Géza Szilvay	The Helsinki Junior Strings	1992	10:40	?	Finlandia	(Note: C/G. Szilvay–Finlandia (544692) 1994)
24	Juha Kangas	Ostrobothnian Chamber Orchestra	1993	10:54	Kaustinen Church	Finlandia	(Note: J. Kangas–Finlandia (4509–98995–2) 1996)
25	Péter Csaba	Virtuosi di Kuhmo	1994	11:01	Kuhmo Church	Ondine	(Note: P. Csaba–Ondine (ODE 830–2) 1994)
26	Sir Colin Davis	London Symphony Orchestra	1994	14:40	Blackheath Concert Halls	RCA Red Seal	(Note: C. Davis–RCA Red Seal (82876–55706–2) 2003)
27	Michael Bartosch	Musica Vitae	2001	11:56	Hemmesjö Church	Intim Musik	(Note: M. Bartosch–Intim Musik (IMCD 076) 2001)
28	Osmo Vänskä	Lahti Symphony Orchestra	2002	12:18	Sibelius Hall	BIS	(Note: O. Vänskä—BIS (CD–1265) 2004)
29	Vladimir Ashkenazy	Royal Stockholm Philharmonic Orchestra	2006	10:28	Stockholm Concert Hall	Exton	(Note: V. Ashkenazy—Exton (OVCL–00279) 2007)
30	Thomas Kemp	Chamber Domaine	2017	10:57	Sidney Sussex College Chapel; St Mary's Church, West Malling	Resonus Classics	(Note: T. Kemp–Resonus Classics (RES10205) 2018)
31	Susanna Mälkki	Helsinki Philharmonic Orchestra	2020	11:16	Helsinki Music Centre	BIS	(Note: S. Mälkki—BIS (SACD–2638) 2023)
32	Edward Gardner	Bergen Philharmonic Orchestra	2021	11:55	Grieg Hall	Chandos	(Note: E. Gardner–Chandos (CHSA 5217) 2021)

== Literature ==
- Tomi Mäkelä: "Jean Sibelius und seine Zeit" (German), (tr. "Jean Sibelius and his time") Laaber-Verlag, Regensburg 2013
