= Carole Dawn Reinhart =

American musician (born 1941)

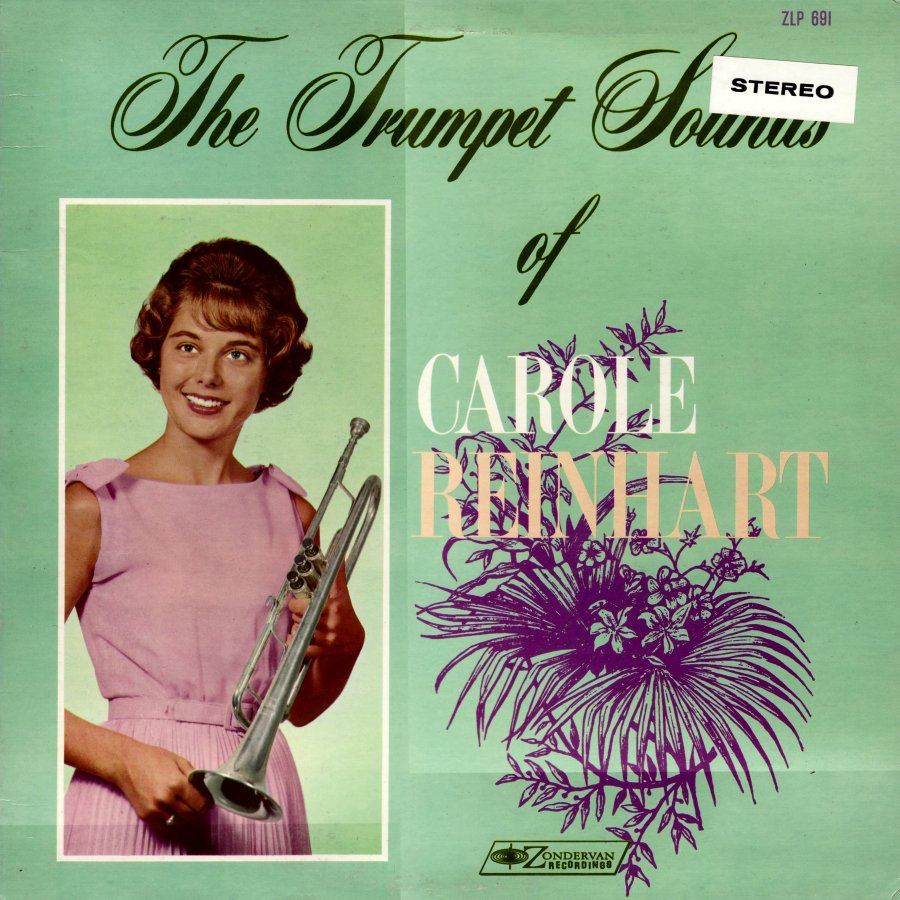
- Cover of record The Trumpet Sounds of Carole Reinhart, 1965
- Born: December 20, 1941 (age 84); Roselle, New Jersey, U.S.
- Education: Juilliard School
- Occupations: Classical trumpet player; Academic teacher
- Employers: Deutsche Oper Berlin; Vienna Music Academy

Carole Dawn Reinhart (born December 20, 1941) is an American musician. She is a trumpet soloist and Professor Emeritus at the University of Music and Performing Arts Vienna.

== Early life ==
Reinhart was born on December 20, 1941, in Roselle, New Jersey, the daughter of C. O. Reinhart and Mabel Geiger Reinhart. Her mother, a trombonist, gave Reinhart her first brass lessons on the slide cornet aged two and a half years. By the age of seven she was playing trumpet duets with her brother, Rolfe, who was known as a "boy trumpeter" and also received scholarships to study music.

At age 10, Reinhart received her first scholarship to the Juilliard School of Music in New York. She was the first woman to be honoured as a bandleader for the Salvation Army. At the age of sixteen she gave her first international concert in Toronto. As a result, she received a scholarship to the University of Miami and was named "National College Queen" in 1960. A Fulbright Scholarship enabled her to travel to Austria to study with Helmut Wobisch at the Vienna Music Academy, where she was the first female brass player to graduate with distinction. Reinhart returned to America to complete her studies at the Juilliard School of Music. She was first trumpet in the Juilliard Orchestra under Jean Morel, and graduated with a BA and an MA.

== Career ==
Reinhart's career continued after university, with work in television programs and in orchestras across the U.S. Television work included: several installments of Fanfare, a 1965 musical variety series hosted by the popular trumpet player Al Hirt; one episode of To Tell the Truth in 1961; and appearances in the series Musik! Musik! from 1974. In 1971 she moved to Berlin, where she performed with the Deutsche Oper Berlin and continued her international concert career. Reinhart gave the premiere performance of Gottfried von Einem's Geistliche Sonate (Sacred Sonata) in 1974. She recorded classical trumpet literature with the Munich Philharmonic and German Bach Soloists. In 1983 she was appointed as professor of trumpet at the Vienna Music Academy; from 1996 to 1998 she was also head of the department for wind and percussion. She recorded a number of solo albums and was featured as trumpet soloist on an album by soprano Lucia Popp, Jauchzet Gott in allen Landen, including Bach's cantata, where her style was described as "excellent" and "beautifully controlled". In 1996 she ended her solo career, but continued to teach at the Vienna Music University until 2011. In 2009 Reinhart wrote her dissertation on Women Brass Musicians: Historical Documentation and the Influence of the International Women's Brass Conference on their Profession.

During her career Reinhart was discriminated against because she was a woman. Critics were dismissive of her and often focused their reviews on her appearance rather than her musicality. When she became engaged to fellow trumpeter Mannfred Stoppacher, critics suggested that he was the reason for her success, rather than her own achievements.

== Discography ==
=== Solo releases ===
Reinhart appears on solo recordings:

- The Trumpet Sounds of Carole Reinhart – Carole Dawn Reinhart – Zondervan Victory Recording (1965)
- Kompositionen für Trompete – Carole Dawn Reinhart, Jean-Claude Van den Eynden – Deutsche Grammophon (1973)
- Trompete – Carole Dawn Reinhart, Munich Philharmonic Orchestra, Marc Andreae, German Bach Soloists, Helmut Winschermann, Amsterdam Chamber Orchestra, Marinus Voorberg – Acanta (1976)
- Trompeten Konzerte – Carole Dawn Reinhart, Munich Philharmonic Orchestra, Marc Andreae – BASF (1976)
- Barock-Konzerte – Carole Dawn Reinhart, German Bach Soloists, Helmut Winschermann – Acanta (1977)
- Bläser-Divertimenti – Carole Dawn Reinhart, Bläserensemble Mainz, Jean Françaix – WERGO (1977)
- Trompete und festliche Arien – Carole Dawn Reinhart, Lucia Popp, Jorma Hynninen, Amsterdam Chamber Orchestra, Marinus Voorberg – Acanta (1979)
- Harald Genzmer: Kantate für Sopran, Trompete und Streicher / Konzert für Trompete und Streicher – Carole Dawn Reinhart, Württemberg Chamber Orchestra Heilbronn, Jörg Faerber – Colosseum (1983)
- Brass of Praise – Carole Dawn Reinhart (1984)
- The First Queen of Trumpet & Her Best Recordings – Carole Dawn Reinhart, Munich Philharmonic, Marc Andreae, German Bach Soloists, Helmut Winschermann, Amsterdam Chamber Orchestra, Marinus Voorberg – Acanta (2013)

=== Other recordings ===
- Gottfried von Einem – Carinthischer Sommer – Austria Tabak
  - Geistliche Sonate für Sopran, Trompete und Orgel, Op. 38, by Gottfried von Einem, with Arleen Auger (soprano) and Thomas Daniel Schlee (organ)
- The National Brass Band Festival, Royal Albert Hall, RCA (1976)
  - Carnival of Venice by Del Staigers
  - Danza Alegre by James Burke
- Das Goldene Sonntagskonzert 3, Acanta (1979)
  - Hummel: Trumpet Concerto, third movement Rondo-Allegro, with Munich Philharmonic and Marc Andreae
- Virtuose Trompete, recordings also by Ludwig Güttler, Gerd Zapf, Maurice André, Guy Touvron, – Sonocord (1983)
  - Hummel: Trumpet Concerto
