= Elegia (Madetoja) =

Composition by Leevi Madetoja

- by Leevi Madetoja
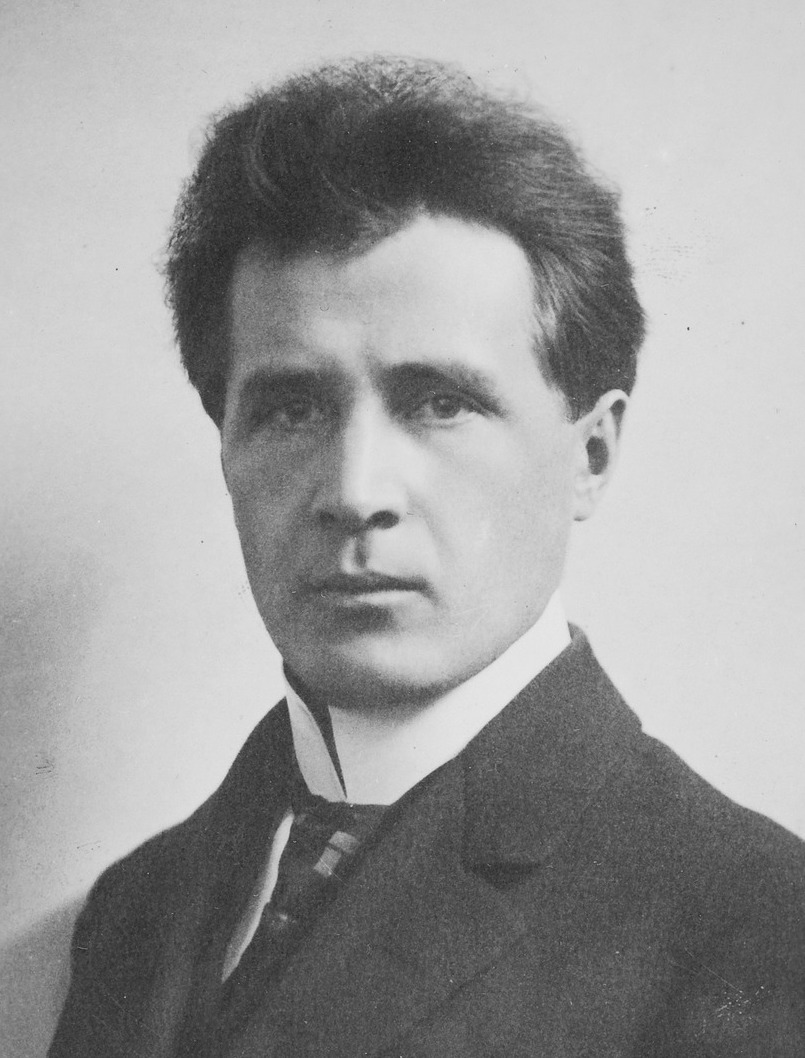
- The composer (c. 1915–1918)
- Opus: 4/1
- Composed: 1909
- Duration: Approx. 5 minutes

Premiere
- Date: 10 January 1910
- Location: Helsinki, Finland
- Conductor: Robert Kajanus
- Performers: Helsinki Orchestral Society

Elegia (In English: Elegy; occasionally with the Finnish subtitle Suru, or Sadness), Op. 4/1, is a composition for string orchestra by the Finnish composer Leevi Madetoja, who wrote the piece in 1909 during his student years. On 10 January 1910, Robert Kajanus, chief conductor of the Helsinki Orchestral Society, premiered the Elegia to great acclaim, with the piece described as the "first master work" of a budding "natural orchestral composer". Madetoja subsequently designated the Elegia as the first number in his four-movement Sinfoninen sarja (Symphonic Suite), Op. 4, which the Helsinki Orchestral Society performed in its entirety under the composer's baton on 26 September 1910. The suite's three other numbers are virtually unknown, and the Elegia typically is performed as a stand-alone concert piece. Stylistically reminiscent of Tchaikovsky, it is, to date, Madetoja's most recorded and well-known orchestral composition, as well as the most enduringly popular of his many miniatures.

== History ==
In 1906, Madetoja enrolled at the University of Helsinki and the Helsinki Music Institute (founded by Martin Wegelius in 1882), where he studied music theory, composition, and piano under, among others, Armas Järnefelt and Erik Furuhjelm. During his time at the Music Institute, Madetoja's first compositions premiered at various student concerts: in December 1908, the Op. 2 songs, Yksin and Lähdettyäs; and on 29 May 1909, the Piano Trio, Op. 1 (second and third movements only).

Even more significantly, in January 1910, Robert Kajanus, chief conductor of the Helsinki Orchestral Society, conducted the premiere of Madetoja's Elegia on 10 January 1910; the program featured the Third Symphony, Im Walde (In the Forest) of Swiss-German composer Joachim Raff (1869) . The critics received the Elegia enthusiastically, describing it as the "first master work" of a budding "natural orchestral composer".

Additional praise followed Madetoja's first composition concert in Helsinki on 26 September 1910, at which he conducted the Piano Trio, the Chess Suite, Op. 5 (excerpted from the incidental music Madetoja had composed for Eino Leino's play), and his new four-movement Symphonic Suite, Op. 4, for which he had decided to designate his Elegia as the first number. One such positive review, for example, came from the pen of Martin Wegelius, who wrote:

Rarely it is possible to return from a first-timer's concert with such great feelings of satisfaction. Indeed very few of us Finns are equipped with such extensive spiritual gifts, that he is able to 'break through' with those so quickly, to conquer the audience in only one evening. Leevi Madetoja did it yesterday and did it in a way which can only be called unique

— Martin Wegelius, in a September 1910 review in Helsingin sanomat

The positive reviews did, however, contain a note of concern; with Madetoja's plans to travel to Paris to resume his studies well known, one critic, Evert Katila of Uusi Suometar, worried about the negative "influence French modern atonal composition" could have on "this fresh northern nature [Madetoja]".

== Orchestration ==
The instrumentation used for the Elegia is as follows:

- Strings: violins, violas, cellos, double basses

Each of the Symphonic Suite's remaining three numbers (Nos. 2–4) utilizes a full concert orchestra, including woodwinds, brass, percussion, and harp.

== Structure ==
The Symphonic Suite, of which the Elegia is a component number, is in four movements. The suite's three other numbers (Nos. 2–4) are virtually unknown, and the Elegia typically is performed as a stand-alone concert piece. The entire suite, which is about 35 minutes in duration, contains the following movements:

1. Elegia (Elegy), "Suru" ("Sadness")
2. Notturno (Nocturne)
3. Pastorale, "Im Urwalde" ("In the Wild")
4. Finale

== Discography ==
Thus far, only Nordic orchestras and ensembles have recorded the Elegia, which typically appears as the 'Madetoja entry' on compilation CDs of orchestral miniatures by various Finnish composers. On the other hand, Arvo Volmer and the Oulu Symphony Orchestra (1998–2006) and John Storgårds and the Helsinki Philharmonic Orchestra (2012–13) have each recorded the Elegia as a component piece of their larger recording projects of Madetoja's orchestral works. The world premiere (and to date only) recording of the complete four-movement Symphonic Suite is by Volmer and the Oulu Symphony Orchestra.

Conductor	Orchestra	Recorded	Duration	Label
Csaba & Géza Szilvay	The Helsinki Strings	1987	5:14	Finlandia (4509-95706-2)
Juha Kangas (1)	Ostrobothnia Chamber Orchestra	1993	5:08	Caprice (CAP 21443)
Jorma Panula	Turku Philharmonic Orchestra	1995	5:03	Naxos (8.551023)
Juha Kangas (2)	Ostrobothnia Chamber Orchestra	1996	5:19	Finlandia (0630-19077-2)
Arvo Volmer	Oulu Symphony Orchestra	2000	5:36	Alba (ABCD 156)
José Serebrier	St. Michel Strings	2011	4:40	Alba (ABCD 341)
Juha Kangas (3)	Ostrobothnia Chamber Orchestra	2011	4:25	Alba (ABCD 344)
John Storgårds	Helsinki Philharmonic Orchestra	2012	5:53	Ondine (ODE 1212-2)

Overall, the critics have received the Elegia favorably. In his review of the Storgårds recording, the American Record Guide's Roger Hecht likens the Elegia to Sibelius's ubiquitous Valse triste or "some moody Tchaikovsky", describing the piece as "beautiful" and "heartfelt"; Guy Rickards, writing in Gramophone, also hears echoes of Valse triste. A number of contributors to the website MusicWeb International have also admired Madetoja's Elegia. Brian Reinhart, who reviews the Panula recording on one of the Naxos compilation discs, names the "gorgeous" Elegia as his "favorite new discovery from the whole set", praising Madetoja for his ability to write "formally precise and emotionally gripping music for string orchestra". Another contributor, John France, argues that the Elegia "should be much better known", nominating it as a "definite candidate for Classic FM" based upon its "beauty" and "restraint".

== References and sources ==
=== Sources ===
Books

- Salmenhaara, Erkki (1987). Leevi Madetoja (in Finnish). Helsinki: Tammi. ISBN 951-30-6725-4.

CD liner notes

- Korhonen, Kimmo (2013b). Leevi Madetoja: Symphony No. 2, Kullervo, Elegy (booklet). John Storgårds & Helsinki Philharmonic. Helsinki, Finland: Ondine. p. 4–6. ODE1212-2.
- Pulliainen, Riitta (2000b). Madetoja Orchestral Works 2: The Spirit Home of My Soul (booklet). Arvo Volmer & Oulu Symphony Orchestra. Tampere, Finland: Alba. p. 4–6. ABCD 144.

Journal articles

- Hecht, Roger (2013). "Madetoja: Symphony 2; Kullervo; Elegy". American Record Guide. 76 (3): 128–29. (subscription required)
- Rickards, Guy (2013). "Reviews: Orchestral - Madetoja: Elegy, Op. 4 No.1; "Kullervo," Op. 15; Symphony No. 2, Op. 35". Gramophone. 90: 60. (subscription required)

Websites

- France, John (2001). "Finnish Orchestral Favorites". musicweb-international.com.
- Reinhart, Brian (2010). "Early One Morning: Finnish Orchestral Favorites". musicweb-international.com.
