= Alison Bury =

British violinist

Alison Bury (born 20 January 1954) is a British violinist who works as a soloist, orchestra leader and chamber musician, specialising in historically informed performances of Baroque music, especially works by J. S. Bach, Vivaldi and Handel. Her teachers include Francis Baines, Nikolaus Harnoncourt and Sándor Végh. She was the leader of the English Baroque Soloists (1983–2008) and a co-leader of the Orchestra of the Age of Enlightenment, of which she was a founding member in 1986, and was also a member of several other well-known period-music ensembles including the Academy of Ancient Music (1975–90), the Taverner Players (1976–92) and the Amsterdam Baroque Orchestra (1980–86).

== Early life and education ==
Bury was born 20 January 1954 in Woking, Surrey. She attended the Royal College of Music, where she was taught violin by Sylvia Rosenberg and Jaroslav Vanáček. There she studied Baroque performance practice with Francis Baines, with whom she also worked on the viol. In 1976 she won a Boise Scholarship and a Countess of Munster Award, which she used to go to Salzburg in Austria (1976–7), where she worked on violin with the chamber music specialist Sándor Végh and on Baroque performance practice with Nikolaus Harnoncourt.

== Career ==
Bury has been part of several ensembles that specialise in historically informed performances of Baroque music, including Concentus Musicus Wien (1970s), Academy of Ancient Music (1975–90), Taverner Players (1976–92), Ars Musica Baroque Orchestra (1978–80), Amsterdam Baroque Orchestra (1980–86), Raglan Baroque Players (from 1980) and the English Baroque Soloists (from 1979), and was a founding member of the Orchestra of the Age of Enlightenment (OAE) in 1986. She led the English Baroque Soloists (1983–2008) and shared the leadership of the OAE (from 1986). She also directed the Baroque Orchestra of the Royal College of Music. In a 2004 interview with The Strad magazine, Bury described the role of the leader at OAE as "primarily... a musical one", describing how she marks bowings on the score, assigns violinists to positions, and mediates between the players and the conductor.

She gave solo concerto performances with the Academy of Ancient Music and the OAE, mainly at the Queen Elizabeth Hall in London, and also on tour in Canada and the United States. With the Academy of Ancient Music under the direction of Christopher Hogwood, her solos include Telemann's Concerto in C for four violins (1981), a concerto from Vivaldi's Op. 8 (1982), Vivaldi's E major concerto (Op. 3, no. 12) (1986), Vivaldi's A major Concerto (Op. 3, no. 5) with Catherine Mackintosh at the Jane Mallett Theatre, Toronto (1986), and "Autumn" from Vivaldi's Four Seasons at the Orchestra Hall, Chicago and the Performing Arts Center Playhouse, Tampa, Florida (1987). Her solo performances with the OAE and its chamber ensemble include Bach's Brandenburg Concerto no. 3 (1987), Bach's Concerto in C major for three violins with Elizabeth Wallfisch and Mackintosh (1996), Francesco Geminiani's orchestration of Corelli's La Follia violin sonata (1997), Vivaldi's Concerto in D minor for Two Violins and Cello with Lucy Howard and David Watkin at the Carnegie Hall, New York (2002), Vivaldi's Concerto Grosso, Op. 3, No. 11 at the Roy Thomson Hall, Toronto (2002), one of Handel's Concerto Grossi at the Royal Festival Hall (2013), and Bach's Concerto for Two Violins with Margaret Faultless (2014). She also performed Vivaldi's B minor concerto for four violins at a concert in memory of the oboist David Reichenberg at St James's in London (1988).

As the co-leader of the OAE, she directed extracts from Handel's Saul and Solomon oratorios with the countertenor Andreas Scholl, on a UK tour in 2000, as well as operatic and orchestral works by Vivaldi, Riccardo Broschi, Gluck and C. P. E. Bach with the soprano Cecilia Bartoli at the Carnegie Hall, New York, in 2002.

As a chamber musician, she has been in the Ruckers Harpsichord Ensemble (1975), Chandos Baroque Players (1981–9), L'École d'Orphée (1982–9) and the Geminiani Trio (1983–90). She taught at the Royal College of Music.

By 2022, Bury had retired from OAE, and as of 2025 is leading The Baroque Collective.

== Style and reception ==
Lucy Robinson, in her Grove Music Online entry, highlights Bury's "beautiful open sound and sensitive phrasing" and writes that she is "highly respected" for her chamber work. Nicholas Kenyon, in a Times review of a solo performance of Vivaldi in 1982, criticises some technical aspects of her delivery but writes that Bury gives "each phrase a highly original twist, as if its rhetoric, purpose and direction had been rethought". Erica Jeal, writing in The Guardian in 2002, describes her playing as "deliciously crisp". Robert Everett-Green, in a review for The Globe and Mail, describes her performance of a Vivaldi concerto in 2002 as "clean yet humdrum" and suggests that Bury might be a "better leader than soloist".

David Fallows, writing in The Guardian in 2000, describes her as "marvellously musical" as a director and leader. Alfred Hickling, also in The Guardian, describes her direction as having "almost imperceptible authority".

Bury is considered to fall within the second generation of violinists performing in a historically informed manner, becoming active in the 1970s and 1980s, with Pavlo Beznosiuk, Micaela Comberti, John Holloway, Monica Huggett, Catherine Mackintosh, Ingrid Seifert, Simon Standage, Elizabeth Wallfisch and others.

== Recordings ==
Her recordings as a soloist include Vivaldi's Four Seasons with both the Academy of Ancient Music and the Taverner Players, as well as Vivaldi's Concerto No. 6, Il Piacere, with the Academy of Ancient Music. Nicholas Anderson, in a Gramophone review of the Taverner Players' recording of the Four Seasons, praises Bury's ornamentation in the slow movement of the "Summer" concerto.

She also recorded J. S. Bach's Concerto for Two Violins twice, with Monica Huggett and the Amsterdam Baroque Orchestra, and with Elizabeth Wallfisch and the Orchestra of the Age of Enlightenment. Joseph McLellan recommends the Amsterdam Baroque Orchestra recording with Huggett in The Washington Post as an "idiomatic and well-played" period-instrument version. Timothy Day describes the version with Wallfisch as having a "gentle lilt" and minimal vibrato in the slow movement. Bury directed Bach's Brandenburg Concerto no. 3 for a 1989 recording of the set with OAE, which Allan Kozinn, in a review for The New York Times, considers one of the more successful concertos of the set.

As a chamber musician, Bury recorded Handel's Trio Sonatas for two violins with John Holloway of L'École d'Orphée (1985), and Corelli's Trio Sonatas for two violins with Huggett. A reviewer of the latter for Gramophone considers Bury to make a "deft" second violin, but comments that "her playing is not so sensuously charged" at that of Huggett.

== Personal life ==
Bury is married to Richard Earle, an oboist with OAE. As of 2024, she lives in Lewes, East Sussex.
