= Orchestra of the Age of Enlightenment =

British period instrument orchestra, founded 1986

Orchestra of the Age of Enlightenment (OAE)
- Orchestra
- The logo of the Orchestra of the Age of Enlightenment
- Founded: 1986; 40 years ago
- Location: London, England
- Concert hall: Southbank Centre
- Website: oae.co.uk

The Orchestra of the Age of Enlightenment (OAE) is a British period instrument orchestra. The OAE is resident orchestra at Southbank Centre and Glyndebourne Festival Opera, Artistic Associate at Kings Place, and has its headquarters at Acland Burghley School. The leadership is rotated between four musicians: Matthew Truscott, Kati Debretzeni, Huw Daniel and Margaret Faultless.

A group of period instrumentalist players formed the OAE as a self-governing ensemble in 1986, and took its name from the historical period in the late 18th century where the core of its repertoire is based. The OAE does not have a principal conductor, but chooses conductors individually. The current Principal Artists are Sir Simon Rattle, Vladimir Jurowski, Iván Fischer, John Butt, Sir Mark Elder and András Schiff. William Christie is Emeritus Conductor, as were the late Frans Brüggen, Sir Roger Norrington, and Sir Charles Mackerras. Other conductors to have worked with the OAE at its invitation include Marin Alsop, Anu Tali, Yannick Nézet-Séguin, Sian Edwards, Edward Gardner, Suzi Digby, Robin Ticciati, Joanna Tomlinson, Philippe Herreweghe, Gustav Leonhardt, René Jacobs, Harry Bicket, Christopher Hogwood, Sigiswald Kuijken, Ivor Bolton, Monica Huggett, and Bruno Weil.

== Beginnings and ethos ==
Martin G. Smith, a banker, co-founded the OAE, securing private funding for its inaugural work and serving on the Board for many years. He was knighted in 2013 and is now Life President of the orchestra.

The OAE's first concerts, in June 1986, were booked at the Oxford Town Hall and the Queen Elizabeth Hall on the South Bank, London. Conducted by Sigiswald Kuijken, the first programme consisted of an Overture Suite by Georg Philipp Telemann, Rameau's Suite from Dardanus, a symphony by Gossec and Haydn's Symphony No. 83. The founding leaders were Catherine Mackintosh, Elizabeth Wallfisch, Alison Bury and Margaret Faultless.

The ethos of the Orchestra is based on democracy; with the idea that the players are not simply technicians but also actively guide the artistic direction of the orchestra. When it began anyone who wanted to could become a member of the orchestra, although they would not necessarily be asked to play. Responsibility for concert planning is given to a Players' Artistic Committee (members of which also sit on the OAE Board of Directors) which is elected annually by the members. An early mission statement stated that the Orchestra of the Age of Enlightenment was to "Avoid the dangers implicit in:

- playing as a matter of routine,
- pursuing exclusively commercial creative options,
- under-rehearsal,
- undue emphasis as imposed by a single musical director,
- recording objectives being more important than creative objectives."

== Since 2000 ==
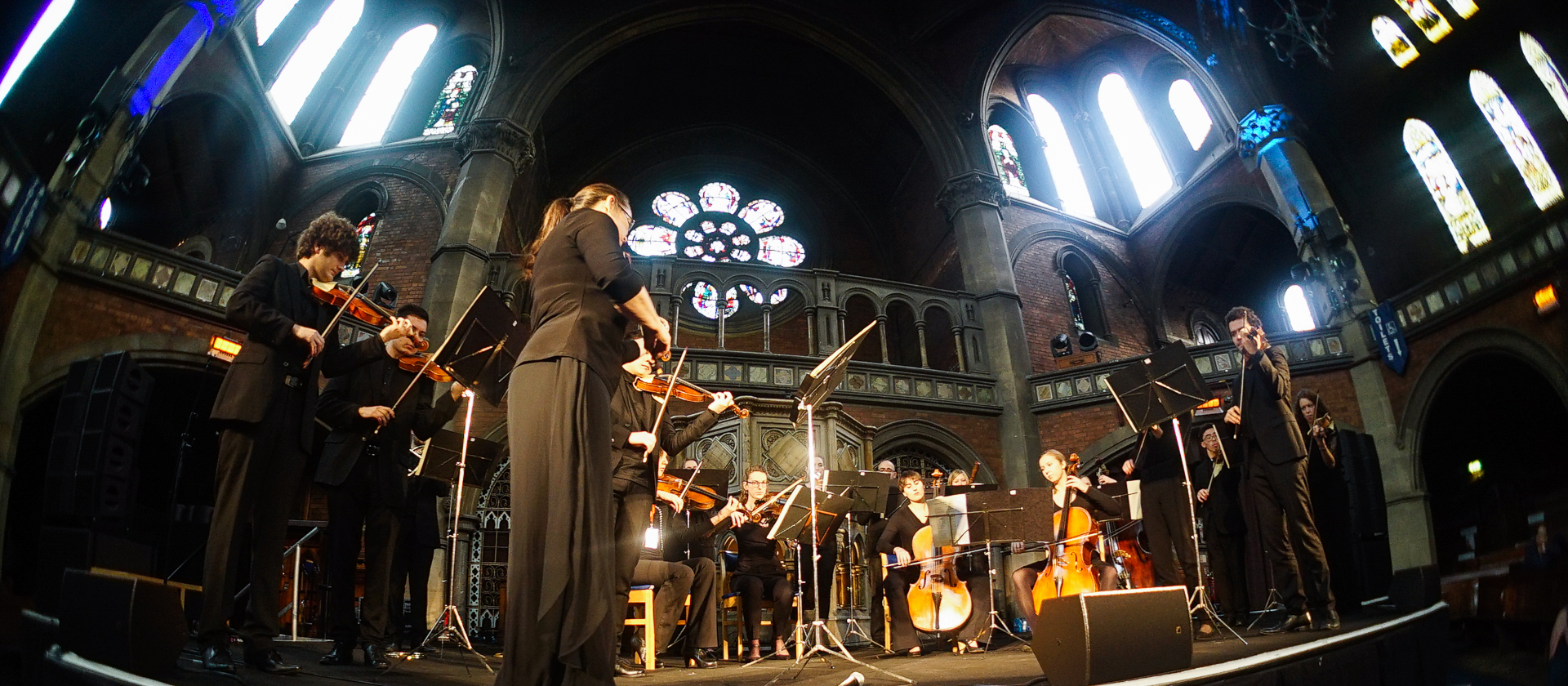
The Orchestra of the Age of Enlightenment performing in the Union Chapel, Islington in 2016

The OAE's current recurring season at the Southbank Centre in London includes concerts at the Queen Elizabeth Hall and Royal Festival Hall. In May 2006, the OAE started a series of informal late night concerts called "The Night Shift", which has twice been nominated for a Royal Philharmonic Society Award for audience development.

The OAE celebrated the 21st anniversary of its founding with a concert at the Royal Festival Hall on 30 June 2007, conducted by Norrington, Elder, Mackerras and Jurowski respectively.

In 2007, the OAE also won the RPS Ensemble award "for its stunning delivery of a breadth of repertoire, indefatigable advocacy of the interpretation of music played on original instruments and pioneering work in education and through a range of media – not to mention the artistry of its individual members in making each listening experience uniquely creative, engaging and thrilling."

In July 2008, the OAE moved its headquarters to Kings Place in London where it shared an office with the London Sinfonietta.

On 29 January 2010, The Night Shift (and the OAE) made its first appearance at The Roundhouse in Camden, North London.

In August 2010 the OAE played at the Royal Albert Hall as part of the BBC Proms season, performing Wagner's Tristan und Isolde (Act 2) and the Love Scene from Romeo and Juliet by Berlioz. The concert was conducted by Sir Simon Rattle and included soloists Sarah Connolly, Ben Heppner and Violeta Urmana.

In September 2020 the orchestra, led by Jonathan Cohen and featuring Nicola Benedetti, Rodolfo Richter and Matthew Truscott, again played at the Royal Albert Hall as part of the BBC Proms season, performing Vivaldi's Concerto in D major for two violins, Concerto in D minor for two violins and Concerto in A minor for two oboes, Handel's Concerto grosso in B flat major and Passacaglia from Radamisto, Charles Avison's Concerto grosso no. 5 in D minor and Bach's Concerto in D minor for two violins.

In September 2020, the Orchestra moved its headquarters again – this time to Acland Burghley Secondary School in Tufnell Park, Camden, North London.

The OAE has toured many countries, including South America and the US in 2002, and toured South East Asia for the first time in autumn 2003. The Orchestra's discography covers more than fifty recordings in music from Henry Purcell to Verdi working with guest artists including Lorraine Hunt Lieberson, Renée Fleming, Susan Graham, Andreas Scholl, Ian Bostridge, Elizabeth Wallfisch, Emanuel Ax, Thomas Hampson, Cecilia Bartoli, Gerald Finley, Bob van Asperen, Anner Bylsma, Viktoria Mullova, and Michael Chance.

The OAE does much work with schools, especially in the area surrounding Kings Place, and is very active in performing concerts for local schools, leading projects with young people and teaching children to play musical instruments. Over the spring/summer of 2010, the OAE are running a series of three concerts inspired by Monteverdi's Vespers for the schools in which they work.

=== Acland Burghley Residency ===
In September 2020, the Orchestra of the Age of Enlightenment moved into Acland Burghley School in Tufnell Park, Camden. The administrative office, library and recording studio are based on campus and the musicians use the school's grade II listed assembly hall for rehearsals, workshops and small performances.

"However, the partnership — underwritten for the first three years by £120,000 from the Sainsbury family's Linbury Trust — goes a lot further than that. Burghley's pupils will have the chance to listen to rehearsals and collaborate on artistic projects. The first of these happens this term, when the school's outstanding dance students explore music by the 18th-century French composer Rameau. Indeed, the hope is that the OAE's continuous presence at the school's heart will be transformational in many ways, not just in music.

The model is a project that happened in Bremen, Germany, where the Deutsche Kammerphilharmonie moved into a comprehensive in a deprived area. According to the OAE, the project has resulted in "improved academic performance and language skills, reputational benefits, greater engagement with music among pupils ... and even an improvement in the orchestra's own playing".

=== The Night Shift ===
The Night Shift is a concert series where classical music is presented in a relaxed and informal setting. Established in 2006 by the Orchestra of the Age of Enlightenment, the aim is to work outside the traditions associated with concert of the classical genre. Unusual characteristics include the concise length of each performance, the invitation to bring alcoholic drinks into the concert hall, and the ability to clap and talk at your own convenience. Since its creation, The Night Shift has proven successful among people under the age of 35. More than 80 per cent of the audience falls within this age bracket and approximately 20 per cent of the audience is attending a classical concert for the first time.

=== Ann and Peter Law OAE Experience for young players ===
The Ann and Peter Law OAE Experience scheme is an apprenticeship scheme for young period instrumentalists, and is the only scheme of its type with a period orchestra. Established in 2002, the scheme is consistently over-subscribed and offers its participants the opportunity to be mentored by OAE musicians, play in rehearsals alongside the OAE's roster of guest conductors and also perform with the OAE, as well as sometimes giving concerts as an ensemble in itself.
