= Elegia =

Elegia may refer to:

- The Latin term for "elegy"
- Elegia (moth), a snout moth genus in subfamily Phycitinae
- Elegia (plant), a South African plant genus in family Restionaceae
- Elegia (film), 1979 Polish film directed by Paweł Komorowski
- Elegia (literary club) Nakhodka in 1970
- Elegia (Madetoja), a composition for string orchestra by the Finnish composer Leevi Madetoja
- "Elegia" (song), by New Order
- Elegia (album), by Paolo Conte
