= Lonesome Orchestra =

The Lonesome Orchestra is a collaboration between Sebastiaan Koolhoven and Ton Snijders. It is not the first time that both composers work together. Snijders's solo CDs "Zwaluw 22" and "Thuis", for instance, also were collective actions. For Lonesome Orchestra, this collaboration developed into an equal partnership in the fields of composition as well as production. "Ode to a dream", which was released in May 2014, is the first CD under the flag of Lonesome Orchestra. The first performance took place in the Koningshof theatre in Maassluis on 13 January 2014.

== Style ==
The character of the instrumental music is highly cinematic, especially by the cooperation of the City of Prague Philharmonic. Solo performers like a.o. Emmy Verhey, Angelo Verploegen, and Hermine Deurloo have contributed musically as well.

== History ==
The two met during the Frank Boeijen concerts "Live in Antwerpen" in 2004. Koolhoven made the arrangements for the "Il Novecento Orchestra", Snijders was the keyboard player in the band of Frank Boeijen. Their strong personal and musical click made them decide to intensify their collaboration during the realization of "Zwaluw 22" (2007) and "Thuis" (2010), Snijders' two solo CDs.

== Origin of the music ==
Solo performers who contributed to this CD were Emmy Verhey (violin), Angelo Verploeg (trumpet, flugelhorn), Hermine Deurloo (mouth organ), and Ro Kraus (violin, viola). Some of the recordings were done with the City of Prague Philharmonic in Prague. Part of the concerts are projections, partly based on these historic stereographies.

== Discography ==
- 2014: Ode to a dream
