= Kuusisto =

Kuusisto may refer to:

- Kuusisto (island), in Kaarina, Finland
- Kuusisto (surname)
