= Francis Baines (musician) =

Frances Baines
- Born: 11 April 1917; Oxford, Oxfordshire, England
- Died: 4 April 1999 (aged 81) Ballydehob, County Cork, Ireland
- Genres: Double bass; treble viol
- Occupations: Composer, instrumentalist, teacher

Francis Athelstan Baines (11 April 1917 – 4 April 1999) was a British player of the treble viol, double bass and other instruments, composer and teacher. He co-founded and led the Jaye Consort of Viols.

== Biography ==
Baines was born on 11 April 1917 in Oxford. His younger brother was the musicologist, conductor and bassoonist Anthony Baines. Francis Baines attended the Royal College of Music, where he was taught by the composer Herbert Howells. Early in his career, he played the double bass in the Boyd Neel Orchestra (where he was principal) and the Philomusica. He later embraced the period instrument movement, playing the treble viol. His playing, and that of his wife, June, is described in his Grove Music Online entry as "sweet and lyrical". He founded the Jaye Consort of Viols with June Baines in 1959, which he also led. The Jaye Consort was the most important and consistent consort of viols in Britain since the Second World War, and made several significant recordings. They played and rehearsed almost every day in the Baines's house in Barnes, London. He also played in the Academy of Ancient Music.

Baines often performed at the Aldeburgh Festival. He took part in a performance of Schubert's Trout Quintet with Benjamin Britten and the Amadeus Quartet, and played nine different instruments in a recording of medieval music. He had an important collection of 17th-century viols, and "rare and early" musical instruments.

His Fanfare was included in Gerard Hoffnung's first Music Festival Concert along with works by the better-known British composers Malcolm Arnold and William Walton. His compositions include three symphonies (from 1953 and 1957), two overtures, a Divertimento, a violin concerto, and a set of Comic Variations.

He taught at the Royal College of Music and founded the Baroque Orchestra there. His students include Alison Bury.

Baines retired to Ballydehob, County Cork, Ireland, and died there on 4 April 1999. A memorial concert for him and June Baines was held in June 1999.
