= Michael Ponti =

German pianist (1937–2022)

- Born: 29 October 1937; Freiburg im Breisgau, Baden, Germany
- Died: 17 October 2022 (aged 84); Garmisch-Partenkirchen, Bavaria, Germany
- Education: Musikhochschule Frankfurt
- Occupation: Classical pianist
- Awards: Busoni Piano Competition

Michael Ponti (29 October 1937 – 17 October 2022) was a German-American classical pianist. He was the first to record the complete piano works by Tchaikovsky, Rachmaninoff and Scriabin. He made more than 80 recordings, around 50 of rarely played concertos from the Romantic period, often the only recording of these works at the time. He played and recorded chamber music with his Ponti-Zimansky-Polasek Trio.

== Life and career ==
Ponti was born in Freiburg im Breisgau; his father was a U.S. diplomat, and his German mother later became an American citizen. He lived in the United States for most of his childhood and youth. While still attending school in Washington, D.C., he received piano lessons for ten years, seven of them with Gilmour McDonald, who had studied with Leopold Godowsky. At age eleven, he played both volumes of Bach's Well-Tempered Clavier in four recitals at the YMCA in Washington from memory.

The family returned to Germany in 1955. Ponti studied at the Musikhochschule Frankfurt until 1961, with Erich Flinsch who had been a pupil of and an assistant to Emil von Sauer. He took master classes with Arthur Rubinstein and Robert Casadesus.

In 1964, Ponti was a finalist of the Queen Elisabeth Competition, and won first prize in the Busoni Piano Competition in Italy, which opened the way to an international career. Soon afterwards, he made his Vienna debut by performing Bartók's 2nd Piano Concerto, with Wolfgang Sawallisch conducting. For his official New York debut, he played a recital at the Alice Tully Hall in March 1972, and remembered:

I started off with Beethoven Op. 2 No. 1, then the Tchaikovsky G major sonata, the three hardest Rachmaninov preludes including the big E minor, both books of Brahms-Paganini, the Scriabin G sharp minor sonata, Petrushka and then nine encores. I asked the audience to choose any one from a list of 54. I ended with Scriabin's 5th Sonata. It was midnight by the time we had all had enough.

In 1976, Iain Hamilton composed a piano sonata for him. Ponti played with orchestras including the Orchestre de la Suisse Romande, Buenos Aires Philharmonic, Bamberg Symphony Orchestra and the Accademia Nazionale di Santa Cecilia, and with conductors such as Sixten Ehrling, Stanisław Skrowaczewski and Georg Solti. He toured extensively throughout Europe, Egypt, Japan and South America. In 1974 he toured in Southern Africa and in 1977 in Australia. In 1977, he founded his own trio, with violinist Robert Zimansky and cellist Jan Polasek; they played for 20 years.

In the late 1990s, a stroke left him without the use of his right hand and arm. Despite extensive rehabilitation, he was unable to return to regular performance or recording. However, he gave concerts of left-handed music for a while.

Ponti died in Garmisch-Partenkirchen on 17 October 2022, aged 84.

== Recordings ==
Ponti began recording in 1961, Ravel's Jeux d'eau and Alborada del gracioso for Christophorus and Schubert's Wanderer Fantasy and Beethoven's Eroica Variations.

Ponti was noted for his wide-ranging recordings of the unknown romantic repertoire on the Vox and Candide labels. He recorded a series of concertos, many of which had never been recorded before, and some of which have been unrecorded since. The series with Vox of around 50 recordings began in 1968 with a recording of the Piano Concerto No 3 and some etudes by Ignaz Moscheles, followed the same month by Adolf von Henselt's Piano Concerto and etudes. He was the first to record Charles-Valentin Alkan's Concerto da camera No. 2 in 1979. Composers of the series also included Mily Balakirev, Moritz Moszkowski, Hans Bronsart von Schellendorff, Clara Schumann and Sigismond Thalberg. He included works by Eugen d'Albert, William Berwald, Alexander Glazunov, Hermann Goetz, Ferdinand Hiller, Henry Litolff, Sergei Lyapunov, Nikolai Medtner, Joachim Raff, Carl Reinecke, Anton Rubinstein, Xaver Scharwenka, Christian Sinding, Bernhard Stavenhagen and Karl Tausig. In addition, he was the first to record the complete piano music of Scriabin, much of which was otherwise unavailable then, though it has since been recorded by Vladimir Ashkenazy, Piers Lane and others. He was again the first to record the complete piano music of Tchaikovsky and Rachmaninoff.

With the Ponti-Zimansky-Polasek Trio, he recorded chamber music by Mozart, Beethoven, Brahms, Dvořák, Mendelssohn, Saint-Saëns, Shostakovich and Tchaikovsky. He was the accompanist of Dietrich Fischer-Dieskau in a recording of songs by Charles Ives.

His output amounts to more than 80 discs, and many of his recordings have been re-issued on CD, such as seven volumes of The Romantic Piano Concerto.
