= Oskar Back =

Austrian-born Dutch classical violinist (1879 - 1963)

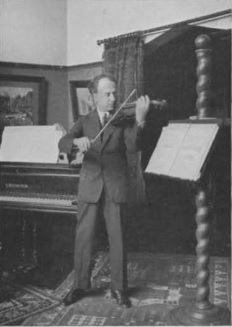
Oskar Back

Oskar Back (9 June 1879 – 3 January 1963) was a noted Austrian-born Dutch classical violinist and pedagogue. He taught at the Amsterdam Conservatory for 42 years, and also had a significant earlier teaching career in Belgium.

== Biography ==
Oskar Back was born in Vienna, Austria, the son of Hungarian parents. He first studied with Jacob Grün at the Vienna Academy of Music, winning the Medal of Honour at age 16. He then went to Belgium for further study with Eugène Ysaÿe and César Thomson at the Royal Conservatory of Brussels.

Although he had a superb technique, he suffered from debilitating stage fright, which meant he was best suited to teaching. He only once ventured onto a public stage for a concerto performance, in Scheveningen on 17 January 1908, with the Hague Philharmonic Orchestra under Henri Viotta.

He first taught at the Brussels Conservatory in 1898, initially deputising for César Thomson, who was frequently concertising. Later he was appointed to a teaching post in his own right. He married Maria Anthonia Vermeer in 1906. They had a son and a daughter. They divorced in 1923.

He left Belgium in 1919, as he had found life difficult there in the First World War as an Austro-Hungarian citizen amid occupying German forces. He settled in Amsterdam, Netherlands, where he coached the violinists of the Concertgebouw Orchestra, and even joined the orchestra himself on occasions. He taught at the Amsterdam Conservatory from 1921 until his death in 1963. He also taught at the Rotterdam Conservatory, and had private students. In 1935 he became a Dutch citizen.

During the German invasion of the Netherlands in World War II, in order to rebut fake identity papers, he was forced to produce documents that demonstrated he had no Jewish heritage, and he was allowed to continue his activities.

His students included Alma Moodie, Herman Krebbers, Emmy Verhey, Theo Olof, Davina van Wely, and others. Queen Elisabeth of Belgium also had lessons with him. See: List of music students by teacher: A to B#Oskar Back. He advocated the exercises of Otakar Ševčík but also encouraged his students to embrace a broad repertoire that did not limit itself to virtuosic pieces and concertos, but included sonatas, chamber music and orchestral repertoire. He was also described as "very strict with his pupils ... passionate, short-tempered, extremely industrious, generous and charming", and had a formidable insight into human psychology.

Oskar Back participated in numerous competition juries, such as the Queen Elisabeth Music Competition and the Geneva International Music Competition.

He wrote his own cadenza for the Brahms Violin Concerto in D.

Oskar Back died in Anderlecht, Belgium in 1963, aged 83.

== Legacy ==
Although he made no recordings, Oskar Back established a foundation to financially assist struggling young, talented violinists. This led to Theo Olof co-founding the National Oskar Back Violin Competition in 1967, which has been held in the Netherlands every two years since then. It is open to Dutch violinists aged between 17 and 26. Winners have included Emmy Verhey, Jaap van Zweden and Vera Beths.
