= Ale Carr =

Swedish musician

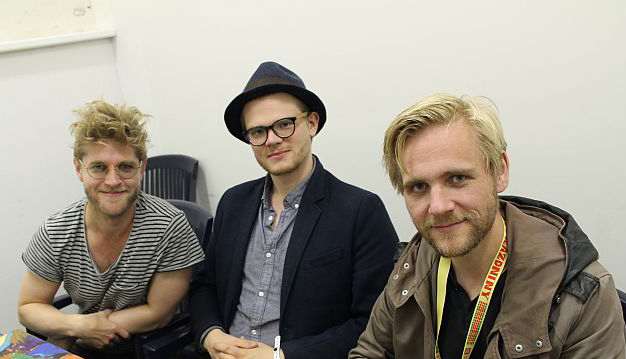
The three members of the Dreamers' Circus band, July 2017. From the left: Nikolaj Busk, Ale Carr, Rune Tonsgaard Sørensen.

Ale Carr is a Swedish multi-instrumentalist, music teacher and composer, known for his work with his Danish trio Dreamers' Circus and his collaboration with the Finnish violinist Pekka Kuusisto.

Notable instruments includes the Nordic cittern and the träskofiol (clog-fiddle). The Press & Journal has described Carr as “one of the leading players of plucked string instruments within the Nordic folk tradition.”

== Career ==
In July 2023, Carr appeared at the BBC Proms in London, performing in a presentation of Vivaldi's Four Seasons with Pekka Kuusisto and the Deutsche Kammerphilharmonie Bremen at the Royal Albert Hall.

According to Scan Magazine, Dreamers’ Circus have collaborated with artists such as The Chieftains, Sharon Shannon, and Japanese composer Yasunori Mitsuda, and have performed with orchestras in Denmark and Sweden. The trio also curate Folkets Festival, a Copenhagen event focused on Nordic folk music and related collaborative performances.

== Awards ==
- 2008 - Zorn award in silver and the title of riksspelman (national folk musician) in Delsbo, Sweden, for playing violin in the tradition of Skåne
- 2013 - Danish Music Awards Folk - Artist of the Year
- 2015 - Danish Music Awards Folk - Composer of the Year
- 2017 - Danish Music Awards Folk - Musician/Instrumentalist of the Year
- 2017 - World champion in Clog-Fiddle
- 2020 - Danish Music Awards Roots - Composer of the Year
- 2025 - Danish Music Awards Roots - Composer of the Year
