= Emmy Verhey =

Dutch violinist (born 1949)

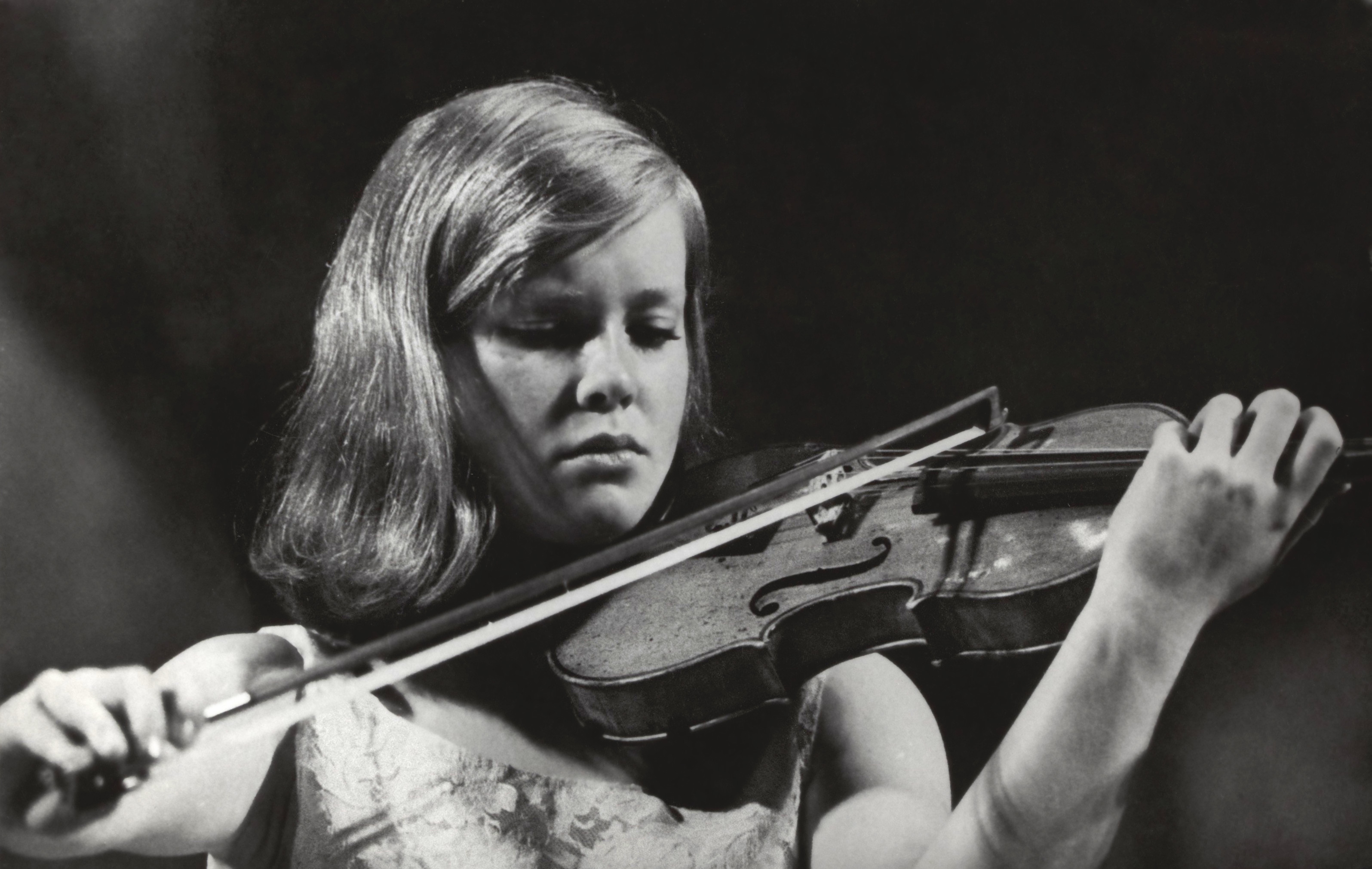
Emmy Verhey (Moscow, 1966)

Emmy Verhey (born 13 March 1949, in Amsterdam) is a Dutch violinist.

== Biography ==
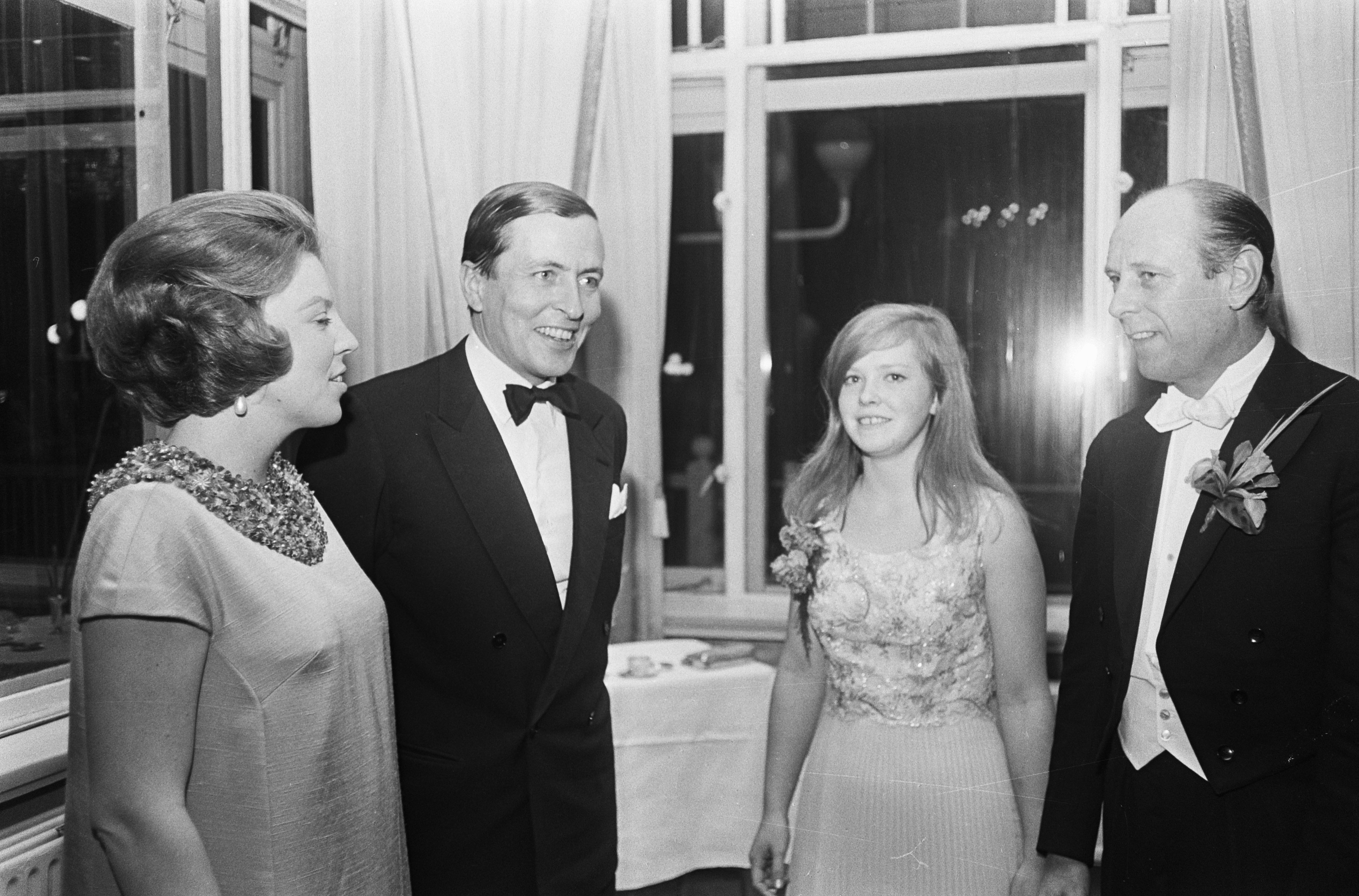
Emmy Verhey in 1967 with Princess Beatrix, Prince Claus and the conductor Jan Brussen during a gala concert

Verhey received her first violin lesson from her father when she was seven. Within a year, she played the Violin Concerto in A minor and the Concerto for Two Violins by Johann Sebastian Bach. Recognized as a child prodigy, she went to study at age 8 with the Austrian-born violin teacher Oskar Back. Later she studied with Herman Krebbers, Bela Dekany, Wolfgang Schneiderhan in Lucerne and David Oistrakh in Moscow.

At age 17, she was the youngest prize winning finalist at the 1966 International Tchaikovsky Competition in Moscow. A week later Verhey graduated from the Amsterdam Conservatory. The public interest for her examination was so huge that it had to take place at the Concertgebouw.

Verhey has played with eminent conductors such as Mariss Jansons, Riccardo Chailly, Bernard Haitink, Hans Vonk, Ed Spanjaard, Edo de Waart, Neville Marriner, Klaus Tennstedt, Jean Fournet and with fellow violinists Yehudi Menuhin, David Oistrakh and Igor Oistrakh. She has also played with soloists such as Youri Egorov, Janos Starker, Mischa Maisky and Maria João Pires. She has performed in Europe and in many other parts of the world such as the United States, Israel, South Korea and Japan. She is known for her solid technique and her warm and rich tone. Her repertoire spans all the range from early to contemporary music.

Verhey taught the violin at Utrecht's Conservatory from 1983 to 2002. In 1991, she co-founded the Camerata Antonio Lucio, a string ensemble whose repertoire includes works from the 18th to the 21st century. Since 2006, the annual three-day Emmy Verhey Festival is held in Verhey's hometown Zaltbommel.

In the presence of Queen Beatrix of the Netherlands, Verhey celebrated her golden jubilee with a concert at the Nieuwe Kerk in The Hague on 20 May 2012. In August 2014, she announced her intention to retire from performance after the summer of 2015. On 29 November 2015 Verhey played her farewell concert in Amsterdam.

Verhey has made over 55 recordings which include works by Johann Sebastian Bach, Ludwig van Beethoven, Johannes Brahms, Alphons Diepenbrock, Antonín Dvořák, Felix Mendelssohn, Wolfgang Amadeus Mozart, Franz Schubert and Pyotr Ilyich Tchaikovsky, among others.

== Instruments ==
In the late 1970s, Verhey acquired the 'Earl Spencer', a Stradivarius from 1712 which she played until she acquired a violin by Andrea Guarneri from 1676 in the late nineties.

In 2000, Verhey commissioned a copy of her Andrea Guarneri, made by the Dutch violinmaker Lambert Houniet.

== Awards and distinctions ==
In 1966, she was the youngest prize winning finalist in the prestigious International Tchaikovsky Competition in Moscow and landed her first recording contract. In 1967, she won the National Oskar Back Violin Competition in Amsterdam. In 1971, she won the Tromp International Music Competition in Eindhoven.

In 2001, Verhey was appointed Ridder in de Orde van de Nederlandse Leeuw, the highest civil order in the Netherlands. In 2012, she received the Andreaspenning from the City of Amsterdam. In 2009, she received the Gemeentepenning from the City of Zaltbommel who also created her 'honorary citizen.'
