= Ilkka Kuusisto =

Finnish composer (1933–2025)

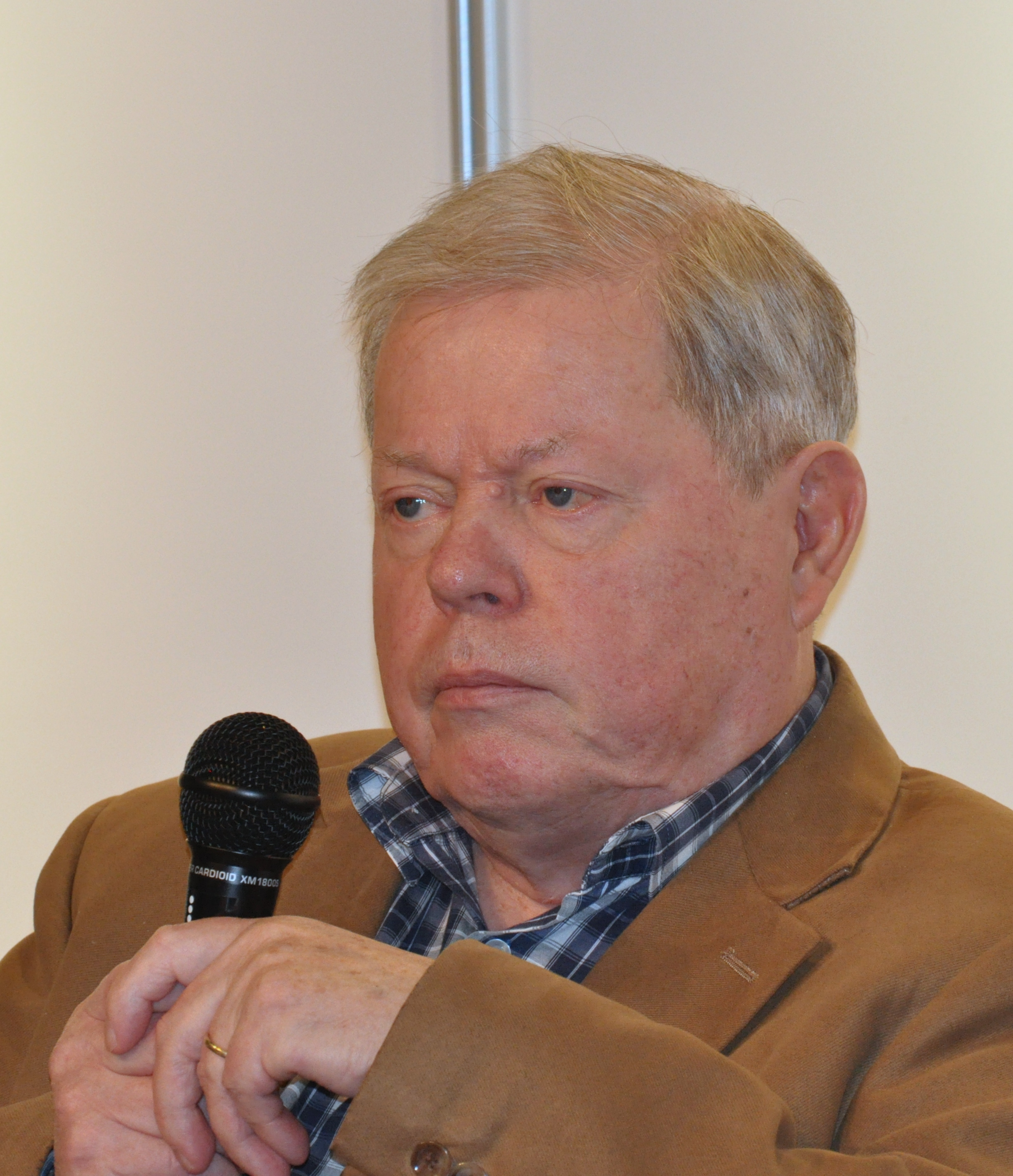
- Kuusisto in 2011
- Born: 26 April 1933; Helsinki, Finland
- Died: 20 February 2025 (aged 91)
- Occupations: Composer; Conductor; Organist; Opera manager
- Organizations: Yle; Musiikki-Fazer; Finnish National Opera
- Awards: Order of the Lion of Finland

Ilkka Taneli Kuusisto (26 April 1933 – 20 February 2025) was a Finnish opera composer, conductor, choirmaster, and organist. He began his career as a church organist, worked for the broadcaster Yle and as artistic director of the publisher Musiikki-Fazer. He was choirmaster of the Finnish National Opera chorus and the Radio Symphony Chorus, and was general manager of the opera from 1984 and 1992. He was one of Finland's most prolific composers of operas, beginning in 1974 with an opera about the Moomins characters, in collaboration with their creator Tove Jansson as librettist and costume designer.

== Early life and education ==
Kuusisto was born in Helsinki on 26 April 1933, the son of the composer and music educator Taneli Kuusisto. He said later that he became interested in music as a teenager when he first heard jazz. He studied at the Sibelius Academy (now part of the University of the Arts Helsinki), qualifying as an organist in 1954, and as a music teacher in 1958. He studied composition with Aarre Merikanto and Nils-Eric Fougstedt, among others, and afterwards furthered his studies in Vienna and New York City.

== Career ==
Kuusisto started his career as a church organist and choral conductor at a parish in Meilahti from 1959 to 1972. nearly two decades. He also led several other choirs, the Etelä-Suomalaisen Osakunnan laulajista (South-Finnish Singers) from 1959 to 1971, the Akateemiseen lauluun (Academic Singers) from 1962 to 1966, and the Finnish National Opera choir from 1963 to 1965. He later worked with the Yle's Radio Symphony Chorus from 1968 to 1977, and with many other choirs.

Kuusisto also worked for the Finnish public broadcaster Yle as deputy director in the music department from 1960 to 1963. He conducted the Helsinki City Theatre orchestra for most of the 1960s. He taught at the Sibelius Academy from 1975 to 1984. He was the artistic director of a leading Finnish music publishing company, Musiikki-Fazer, from 1981 to 1984. He was general manager of the Finnish National Opera from 1984 to 1992, together with Jorma Hynninen and Paavo Suoko.

== Personal life ==
Kuusisto's favourite hobbies were playing jazz and boating. He and his second wife, Marja-Liisa Kuusisto, had two sons, Jaakko and Pekka, who both became known as violinists, conductors and composers. His daughter Lotta Kuusisto became a dancer, choreographer, singer and actress, and his daughter Sanna Kuusisto has worked as a dance teacher.

Ilkka Kuusisto died on 20 February 2025, at the age of 91.

== Works ==
Kuusisto's compositions covers a broad range of genres, including opera, stage and film music, jazz and choral works. He was one of Finland's most prolific composers of operas, from humorous works to grand opera, including musicals for children. The first of his 18 operas was Moominooppera in 1974. Tove Jansson, who had created the Moomins characters, wrote the libretto and designed the costumes. He composed children's songs for the work. His music remained tonal, with exceptions as "spices". He also worked as arranger.

Kuusisto's Divertimento for strings was recorded by the Tapiola Youth Strings conducted by Heikki Pekkarinen, combined with works by other Finnish composers, in 2005. His Symphony No. 1 was recorded in 2010, combined with the Concertino improvvisando for violin and small orchestra and the cantata Kun talo alkaa soida, with his son Pekka Kuusisto and baritone Jorma Hynninen as soloists and the Lahti Symphony Orchestra, conducted by his son Jaakko Kuusisto. The composer said that he composed the symphony in "a state of summer enchantment". The cantata, composed in 1982, sets text from the Bible, the Kalevala poem and by Schopenhauer.

Kuusisto's works include:

=== Orchestral ===
- Symphony No. 1 (1998)
- Concertino improvvisando for violin & small orchestra (2006)

=== Vocal ===
- Kun talo alkaa soida (When the House Begins to Resound) for baritone & orchestra (1992)

=== Opera ===
- Muumiooppera (1974)
- Miehen kylkiluu (1977)
- Sota valosta (1980)
- Jääkäri Ståhl (1981)
- Pierrot ja yön salaisuudet (1991)
- Postineiti (1992)
- Neiti Julie (1994)
- Gabriel, tule takaisin! (1998)
- Isänmaan tyttäret (1998)
- Nainen kuin jäätynyt samppanja (1999)
- Kuninkaan sormus (2000)
- Pula! (2002)
- Matilda ja Nikolai (2003)
- Kotia kohti (2006)
- Vapauden vanki (2006)
- Taipaleenjoki (2009)

=== Screen ===
- Rakkaus alkaa aamuyöstä (1966)

== Awards and honours ==
In 1984, Kuusisto received the Pro Finlandia medal of the Order of the Lion of Finland. In 1992, he was awarded an honorary doctorate (Professori).
