= Réka Szilvay =

Finnish violinist (born 1972)

- Born: 16 April 1972; Helsinki
- Origin: Finland
- Occupations: violinist, professor
- Instrument: violin
- Website: www.rekaszilvay.com

Réka Riikka Szilvay (born 16 April 1972) is a Finnish classical violinist. She was born in Helsinki, Finland, into an Austrian–Hungarian family. She is the daughter of the violinist Géza Szilvay and the niece of the cellist Csaba Szilvay. She is a professor at Sibelius Academy.
