= Pekka Kuusisto =

Finnish musician

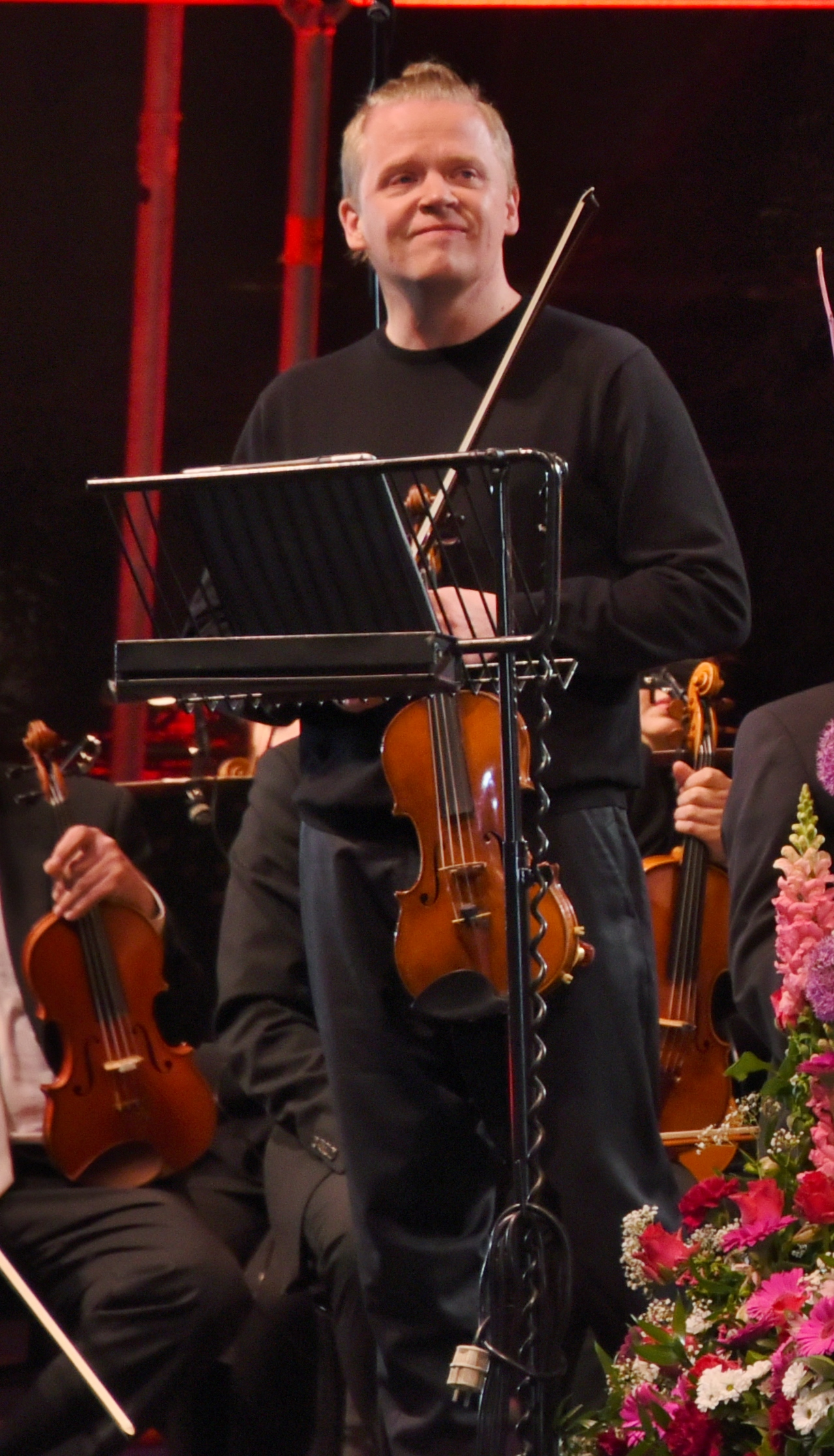
- Kuusisto at the Festival of Joy 2019
- Born: 7 October 1976 (age 49); Espoo, Finland
- Education: Sibelius Academy
- Occupations: violinist; conductor; composer; musical improviser
- Father: Ilkka Kuusisto
- Relatives: Taneli Kuusisto (grandfather); Jaakko Kuusisto (brother)

Pekka Kuusisto (born 7 October 1976) is a Finnish classical violinist and composer.

== Biography ==
Kuusisto comes from a musical lineage. His grandfather was the composer and organist Taneli Kuusisto, his father Ilkka Kuusisto, who had many functions in Finnish musical life including director of the Finnish National Opera, and who was a prolific composer of operas, and his mother was a music teacher. He began studying the violin at the age of three. His first violin teacher was Geza Szilvay at the East Helsinki Music Institute in East Helsinki. In 1983 he enrolled in the Sibelius Academy in Helsinki, and he began to study with Tuomas Haapanen there in 1985. From 1992 to 1996, he studied with Miriam Fried and Paul Biss at the Indiana University School of Music.

In 1995, Kuusisto became the first Finn to win the International Jean Sibelius Violin Competition and was also awarded a special prize for the best performance of the Sibelius violin concerto. He has won other prizes, concertised widely, and recorded works for the Ondine label. Kuusisto plays an Antonio Stradivari violin, made in Cremona c.1695 and known as the 'Ex-Sandars', loaned by Anders Sveaas’ Charitable Foundation.

Kuusisto works with musicians of many different backgrounds. He regularly performs with electronics, giving concerts consisting of mostly improvised material. During the past few years, he has frequently performed a solo recital program consisting of the Partita in D minor by Johann Sebastian Bach and electronic improvisations on funeral chorales. The traditional music of Finland serves as a source of inspiration for Kuusisto, and his approach to the violin has changed substantially since he became more involved with folk music and its performers. He has been a guest performer with groups such as Nightwish, Rinneradio, Don Johnson Big Band, The National and Salsa Dura.

Kuusisto also writes music, but mostly for small ensembles where he is one of the performers. With accordionist Johanna Juhola, he wrote half of the album Max Höjd and half of the music for Auf Wiedersehen Finnland, a documentary film by Virpi Suutari about World War II events in Finnish Lapland. He composed the music for the album Kiestinki, with lyrics by Paula Vesala. Kuusisto has written music for a collaboration between himself, his brother Jaakko Kuusisto and the vocal ensemble Rajaton, themed on climate change. He has also arranged Sibelius's string quartet Voces intimae for chamber orchestra.

In classical circles, Kuusisto is internationally renowned both as soloist and director and is recognised for his fresh approach to the repertoire. A strong advocate of new music, he regularly collaborates with contemporary composers and in the 2012–13 season gave the world premiere of Sebastian Fagerlund's Violin Concerto, written for him and commissioned by the Tampere Philharmonic Orchestra. Other recent highlights have included concerts with the Finnish Radio Symphony, Oslo Philharmonic, Swedish Chamber, Toronto Symphony and Washington's National Symphony orchestras, as well as the Chamber Orchestra of Europe, the Deutsche Kammerphilharmonie Bremen and Konzerthausorchester Berlin.

In 2013–14, Kuusisto joined frequent collaborators Britten Sinfonia in performances of four Britten works as part of the composer's centenary celebrations, with choreography by the Richard Alston Dance Company. He also returned to the Cincinnati Symphony, Royal Stockholm Philharmonic, Singapore Symphony, City of Birmingham Symphony and Philharmonia orchestras.

Kuusisto seeks to engage with people across the artistic spectrum, working on new interpretations of existing repertoire alongside original works. He regularly directs ensembles from the violin, including the Australian, London, Irish, Mahler and Saint Paul chamber orchestras, as well as the Amsterdam Sinfonietta. Recent recital partners include Iiro Rantala, Anne Sofie von Otter, Angela Hewitt, Kimmo Pohjonen and Nicolas Altstaedt. He gave the world premiere of Olli Mustonen's Sonata for Violin and Piano with the composer at the Wigmore Hall in spring 2013, and later the same year toured Europe with his traditional music group, The Luomu Players.

'Our Festival', of which Kuusisto is Artistic Director, provides another opportunity for him to bring a number of art forms together in a single performance. Based in Sibelius's hometown, Järvenpää, it was selected as Festival of the Year by Finland Festivals in 2011. In 2013, Kuusisto gave the world premiere of an electronic work inspired by Magnus Lindberg's Violin Concerto, which he co-wrote with Tuomas Norvio. He also gave duo performances with juggler Jay Gilligan, joined the vocal group Rajaton and performed with Finnish schlager legend Paula Koivuniemi.

Kuusisto has enjoyed a number of prestigious residencies, including at the Aldeburgh Festival, the Concertgebouw's Robeco Zomerconcerten, and as a 'Junge Wilde' artist at the Konzerthaus Dortmund. He oversaw the programming for the 2011 Avanti! Summer Sounds Festival and continues to work regularly with Tapiola Sinfonietta, where he was formerly Artistic Partner (2006–2013).

Kuusisto was featured in the film 4, as the soloist in the winter quarter of Vivaldi's The Four Seasons. The film records four young musicians from around the world playing one 'season' each.

In 2013, he recorded Lindberg's Violin Concerto with the Tapiola Sinfonietta for the Ondine label.

Kuusisto has also composed the music for the 2019 animated show, Moominvalley, along with Samuli Kosminen. That same year, Kuusisto was the main soloist during the Prinsengrachtconcert, an annual open-air concert held on the Prinsengracht in Amsterdam. The televised version attracted 718.000 viewers.

With the Australian Chamber Orchestra's ACO Collective in Melbourne in 2019, Kuusisto gave the premiere of Nico Muhly's Shrink, a concerto for violin and string orchestra, for whom it was written.

In 2021, he was appointed artistic director of Det Norske Kammerorkester.

On 16 July 2023 Kuusisto led an innovative performance of Vivaldi's The Four Seasons at the BBC Proms, alongside folk musician Ale Carr with the Deutsche Kammerphilharmonie Bremen.

== Discography ==
- Sibelius: Violin concerto (Ondine 1996) Pekka Kuusisto, violin & Helsinki Philharmonic Orchestra
- String attached (Ondine 1997). Pekka Kuusisto, violin & Raija Kerppo, piano
- Vivaldi: The four seasons (Ondine 1999). Pekka Kuusisto, violin & Kuhmon virtuoosit
- Folk trip (Ondine 2002). Pekka Kuusisto, violin & The Luomu Players
- Mozart: Violin concertos 3, 4, 5 (Ondine 2003). Pekka Kuusisto, violin & Tapiola Sinfonietta (conductor Olli Mustonen)
- Sibelius, Musical soirée at Ainola (Ondine 2004). Pekka Kuusisto, violin & Heini Kärkkäinen, piano
- Sibelius: Works for violin and orchestra (Ondine 2006). Pekka Kuusisto, violin & Tapiola Sinfonietta
- Subterráneo (Liverace 2009). Pekka Kuusisto, violin & Iiro Rantala, piano
- Paganini duos (Ondine 2009). Pekka Kuusisto, violin & Ismo Eskelinen, guitar
- Kiestinki (Warner Music Nordic 2011). Pekka Kuusisto, violin & Paula Vesala
- Rautavaara: Works for violin and piano (Ondine 2011). Pekka Kuusisto, violin & Paavali Jumppanen, piano
- Nightwish: Imaginaerum (Nuclear Blast Records/Roadrunner Records 2011)
- Lindberg: Violin Concerto; Jubilees; Souvenirs. (Ondine 2013) Pekka Kuusisto, violin & Tapiola Sinfonietta
- Fagerlund: Darkness in Light (Bis 2015). Pekka Kuusisto, violin & Finnish Radio Symphony Orchestra
- First Light (Pentatone 2021). Pekka Kuusisto, violin; Norwegian Chamber Orchestra; Nico Muhly, piano
- Symmetria Pario: Creation (Yarlung Records, 2023). Pekka Kuusisto, violin; Joonas Ahonen, piano
- Willows. Pekka Kuusisto, violin; Sam Amidon, guitar, banjo, vocals; Norwegian Chamber Orchestra
