= ARS Produktion =

German record label

ARS Produktion is a German classical music record label founded in 1987 by flautist Annette Schumacher and based in Ratingen.
