= Robert Zimansky =

American violinist

Robert Zimansky (born 20 April 1948, Iowa City, Iowa) is an American violinist living in Basel, Switzerland.

After early studies with John Ferrell at the University of Iowa, Zimansky studied at the Juilliard School in New York with Sally Thomas and Ivan Galamian. He came to Europe in 1972 and held 1st Concertmaster positions in Munich, Stuttgart, the Lucerne Festival Orchestra, the Zurich Symphony Orchestra and the Orchestre de la Suisse Romande in Geneva. All of these orchestras allowed him the freedom to pursue his solo career.

Robert Zimansky has performed as soloist with many conductors and toured with various chamber music groups. He conducted the Southwest German Chamber Orchestra, the Dayton Philharmonic and the Zurich Academy of Strings. From 1986 to 1992 he was a member of the board of directors of the Swiss “Tonkünstlerverein.” Between 1978 and 2002 he performed regularly in the piano trio with Michael Ponti and Jan Polasek in Europe. Since 2008 Robert Zimansky is a member of the Trio Mersson and artistic director of the Ensemble Fiacorda.

Robert Zimansky has made numerous recordings including his CD of the complete Schumann Sonatas with Christoph Keller, awarded a Grand Prix du Disque de l'Académie Charles Cros in 1986. He is an advocate of unknown repertoire and often plays rarely performed violin concertos from the early 20th century. Many modern composers have dedicated works to him over the years.

Robert Zimansky currently lives in Basel and teaches at the Zürcher Hochschule der Künste and the Conservatoire de Genève.
