= Moscow Virtuosi =

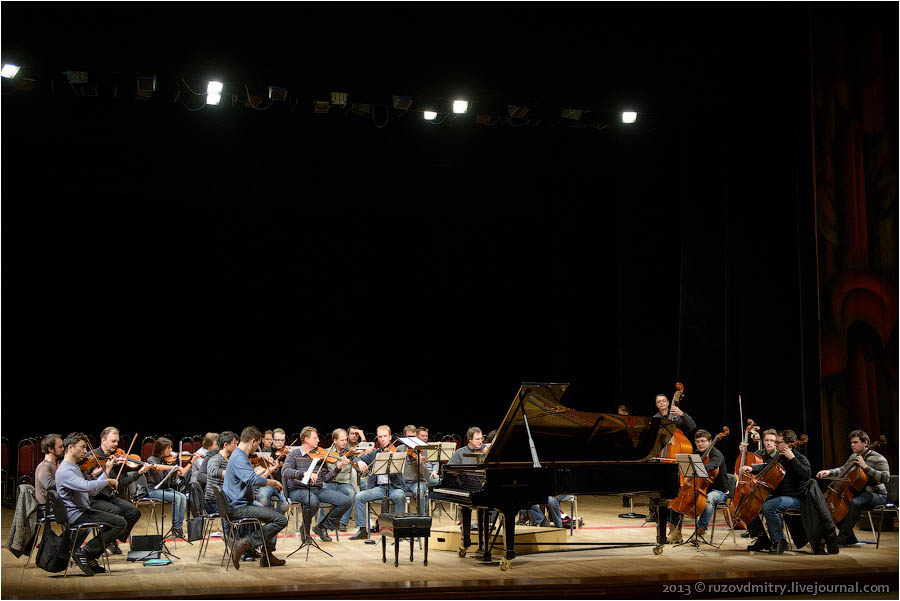
Moscow Virtuosi in 2013

The Moscow Virtuosi is a chamber orchestra founded in 1979 by Vladimir Spivakov, who has been the orchestra's conductor, soloist and creative director ever since.

In 1990, upon invitation of Felipe, Prince of Asturias, the orchestra have left to Spain, but kept performing both in Russia and all over the world. In 1999, the orchestra returned to Russia.
