= Jaakko Kuusisto =

Finnish violinist, composer, and conductor (1974–2022)

- Born: 17 January 1974; Helsinki, Finland
- Died: 23 February 2022 (aged 48) Oulu, Finland
- Occupations: Violinist; Conductor; Composer
- Instrument: Violin
- Years active: c. 1983—2021

Jaakko Ilkka Kuusisto (17 January 1974 – 23 February 2022) was a Finnish violinist, composer, and conductor.

== Education ==
After initial studies under Géza Szilvay and Tuomas Haapanen, Kuusisto went on to win the 1989 Kuopio Violin Competition, place 4th in the International Jean Sibelius Violin Competition the following year, and share the 2nd prize in the 1996 Carl Nielsen International Violin Competition, among others.

Kuusisto studied at the Sibelius Academy in Helsinki, majoring in violin, as well as at Indiana University under Miriam Fried.

== Career ==
As a violinist, Kuusisto appeared in c. 30 recordings, on at least 17 of which he is credited as a primary artist, performing works by composers including Sibelius, Prokofiev, Kalevi Aho and Armas Järnefelt; as a conductor, he recorded a dozen times. On some recordings he collaborated with his brother and fellow violinist Pekka Kuusisto.

After an early career as violinist, Kuusisto increasingly turned his attention to composing and conducting. He composed approximately 40 works in total, including several operas, film scores and stage music, c. 15 pieces of chamber music, and numerous other compositions, as well as various orchestrations and arrangements. Some of his operas were commissioned by the Finnish National Opera and Savonlinna Opera Festival.

Kuusisto worked as the artistic director of the Oulu Music Festival, and chief conductor of the Kuopio Symphony Orchestra. Before these, he served as the concertmaster of the Lahti Symphony Orchestra for many years, where he was personally invited by the orchestra's chief conductor Osmo Vänskä.

== Recognition ==
In 2017, Kuusisto was awarded the Pro Finlandia medal of the Order of the Lion of Finland.

== Personal life ==
Jaakko Kuusisto came from a musical family: his father was opera composer Ilkka Kuusisto, his brother musician Pekka Kuusisto, and his grandfather composer and choirmaster Taneli Kuusisto.

Outside music, Kuusisto was also active in the wider society and politics, and in 2021 became elected member of Oulu city council, representing the Green League.

Kuusisto died from brain cancer on 23 February 2022, at the age of 48. He had been diagnosed and operated on in 2020, and announced on social media to encourage others to seek medical advice "even for mild symptoms", which in his case included headaches and problems with speech.
