= Taneli Kuusisto =

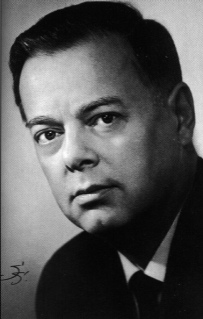
Kuusisto circa 1955

Taneli Kuusisto (19 June 1905 – 30 March 1988) was a Finnish composer, music critic, teacher and choir leader.

His son was composer Ilkka Kuusisto, and his grandsons composer Jaakko Kuusisto and violinist Pekka Kuusisto.

== Filmography ==
- Kirkastettu sydän (1943)
- Ihmiset suviyössä (1948)
- Opus 7 (1949)
- Kirkko suomalaisessa maisemassa (1956)
- Tunne maasi (1957)
