= Forlane (record label) =

French classical music label

Forlane (from the French spelling of the furlana dance) was a French classical music label. It was founded in 1979 by Ivan Pastor, a former producer at Barclay Records, and Yves Roy. The company specialised in song repertoire and recorded artists including Yvette Horner, Jose van Dam, Dame Felicity Lott, Dame Margaret Price, Philip Langridge, Ann Murray and Graham Johnson.
