= Herman Krebbers =

Dutch violinist (1923–2018)

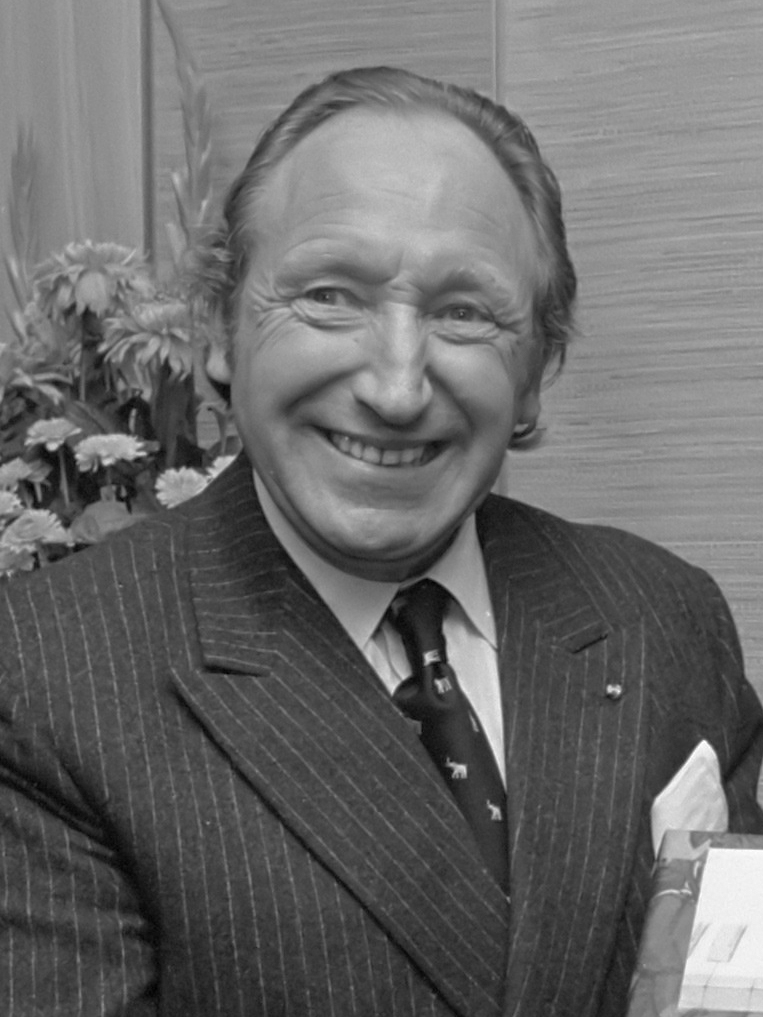
Herman Krebbers (1974)

Herman Krebbers (18 June 1923 – Tilburg 2 May 2018) was a Dutch violinist.

Born in Hengelo, Overijssel, Krebbers studied in Amsterdam with Oskar Back. He gave his first concert at age 10. In 1943, Krebbers debuted with the Royal Concertgebouw Orchestra. During the Second World War, he became a member of the Nederlandse Kultuurkamer, under the control of the Third Reich. This subsequently led to a 2-year ban on performances by him after the war.

In 1950, Krebbers became co-concertmaster (leader) of the Residentie Orchestra, along with his childhood friend Theo Olof. Krebbers became concertmaster of the Concertgebouw Orchestra in 1962. In parallel, he had a career as a soloist and a chamber musician, and taught at the Amsterdam Muzieklyceum (now the Conservatorium van Amsterdam) for many years.

Krebbers suffered a shoulder injury from an accident on his boat in 1979, which forced him to resign from the Concertgebouw Orchestra in 1980. He then focused primarily on teaching, with his work at the Amsterdam Conservatory. His students included Frank Peter Zimmermann, Peter Tanfield, Jeanne Lamon, Vera Beths, Rudolf Koelman, Szymon Krzeszowiec, Jeroen de Groot, Maurits van den Berg jr., Emmy Verhey and André Rieu sr.. He also served as chairman of the jury for the 1996 Leopold Mozart Violin Competition. He curtailed his teaching activities in 2001.

== Recordings ==
- Bach: Concerto for Two Violins with Arthur Grumiaux, Edo de Waart conducting (Philips)
- Bach: Concerto for Two Violins with Theo Olof, André Rieu sr. conducting (Artone)
- Bach: Concerto for violin, strings and continuo with André Rieu Sr. (Artone)
- Beethoven: Violin Concerto with Bernard Haitink (Philips)
- Brahms: Violin Concerto with Willem Mengelberg 1943
- Brahms: Violin Concerto with Bernard Haitink (Philips)
- Dvorak: Violin Concerto with Anton Kersjes (EMI)
- Haydn: Violin Concertos with André Rieu Sr. (Artone)
- Mozart: Violin Concertos K211 and K218 with David Zinman (Philips)
- Nardini: Violin Concerto with André Rieu Sr. (CNR)
- Tchaikovsky: Three Souvenirs with Anton Kersjes (EMI)
- Vivaldi: Concerto for two violins with André Rieu Sr. (Artone)
