= Helmut Winschermann =

German conductor and oboist (1920–2021)

- Born: 22 March 1920; Mülheim an der Ruhr, Rhine, Prussia, Germany
- Died: 4 March 2021 (aged 100); Bonn, North Rhine-Westphalia, Germany
- Occupations: Oboist; Conductor; Academic teacher
- Organizations: Municipal Orchestra of Oberhausen; Frankfurt Radio Symphony Orchestra; Collegium Instrumentale Detmold; Hochschule für Musik Detmold; Deutsche Bachsolisten

Helmut Winschermann (German: [ˈhɛlmuːt ˈvɪnʃɐman]; 22 March 1920 – 4 March 2021) was a German classical oboist, conductor and academic teacher who founded the Deutsche Bachsolisten ensemble for historically informed performances, and was their conductor from 1960 until his death. They made many recordings and toured internationally, especially to Japan.

== Life and career ==
Winschermann was born in Mülheim an der Ruhr in 1920. He first studied violin at the Folkwangschule where he was pointed at the oboe which he studied with Johann Baptist Schlee. He studied also at the Conservatoire de Paris. After only one year of oboe studies, he was engaged at the Witten municipal orchestra, followed by Bad Homburg and Oberhausen. He served in the military in World War II. After the war, he was principal oboe with the Rundfunkorchester Frankfurt.

With the flautist Kurt Redel and harpsichordist Irmgard Lechner, he was a co-founder of the chamber music ensemble Collegium Pro Arte, later called the Collegium Instrumentale Detmold.

In 1956 he was appointed principal chair of the oboe department at the Hochschule für Musik Detmold, having taught there since 1948 when the institution was founded. His students include Hansjörg Schellenberger, Fumiaki Miyamoto, Ingo Goritzki, Günther Passin and Gernot Schmalfuß. He held the professorship until his retirement in 1985.

He recorded Mozart's Oboe Quartet in F major (K.370) with the Kehr Trio, issued in 1957 on Telefunken LGX 66065 in the UK. He maintained a touring schedule as a soloist, and frequently collaborated with the Cappella Coloniensis, the Chamber Orchestra of the Saar conducted by Karl Ristenpart, and Karl Münchinger's Stuttgart Chamber Orchestra.

Winschermann founded the instrumental ensemble Deutsche Bachsolisten in 1960, in order to provide historically informed performances of the music of Johann Sebastian Bach and his baroque contemporaries. He initially divided his time between playing the oboe and conducting the group, but later focussed on conducting solely. Under his direction they have made a multitude of recordings and toured widely internationally. They are particularly popular in Japan, having visited there at least 14 times.

In 2010 the group celebrated its 50th anniversary in a concert at the Beethovenhalle in Bonn, with the 90-year-old Winschermann conducting his own orchestration of Bach's Goldberg Variations. He turned 100 in March 2020. He was found dead at his home in Bonn on 4 March 2021, eighteen days short of his 101st birthday.

== Honours ==
- In 1970, Winschermann was awarded the Officer's Cross of the Order of Merit of the Federal Republic of Germany.
- In 1992, he was made an Honorary Member of the Royal Academy of Music in London.
- In 2013, he received the Telemann Prize of Magdeburg.
