= Csaba Szilvay =

Finnish cellist, teacher and conductor (born 1941)

- Born: 5 September 1941; Budapest
- Origin: Hungary
- Occupations: cellist, conductor
- Instrument: violoncello

Csaba Eörs Gyula Szilvay (born 5 September 1941) is a Finnish cellist, teacher and conductor. He was born in Budapest, Hungary. He is the brother of the violinist Géza Szilvay and the uncle of the violinist Réka Szilvay. With his brother Géza Szilvay he founded the Helsinki Strings, a youth orchestra, in 1972. They conducted it until they retired in 2010.
