= Deutsche Bachsolisten =

Deutsche Bachsolisten (DBS; The German Bach Soloists) is a German Baroque chamber orchestra dedicated to the works of J.S. Bach. It was established by German conductor and oboist, Helmut Winschermann in 1960.
