= Kurt Redel =

German flautist and conductor

Kurt Redel (8 October 1918 in Breslau, Silesia, now Wrocław – 12 February 2013 in Munich) was a German flautist and conductor.

== Early life ==
Redel studied flute, violin, conducting, and composition, as well as music history and piano at the Breslau Conservatory. He worked as a solo flutist for the Meininger Landeskapelle (1938/39), Salzburg Mozarteum (1939/41, where he was also awarded a professorship) and Bavarian State Orchestra/Opera (1941/45). Between 1946 and 1953/56 he taught at the Northwest German Music Academy in Detmold.

== Pro Arte Orchestra ==
In 1953 he founded the (Munich) Pro Arte Chamber Orchestra with which he made numerous recordings of works of Baroque, Classical and later periods. He founded the Lourdes Festival and was its director for 20 years.

Redel died on 12 February 2013. He was 94 years old.
