= Helsinki Strings =

Finnish string orchestra

- String youth orchestra
- Native name: Helsingin juniorijouset
- Former name: Helsinki Junior Strings
- Founded: 1972
- Principal conductor: Kasmir Uusitupa
- Website: www.juniorijouset.fi

The Helsinki Strings (Finnish: 'Helsingin juniorijouset') is a string youth orchestra in Helsinki, Finland.

The orchestra was founded in 1972 by Géza and Csaba Szilvay, who conducted it until their retirement in 2010. The present conductor is Jukka Rantamäki.
