= Purcell Quartet =

The Purcell Quartet, founded in 1983, was one of the world's leading Baroque quartets.

== Background ==
Founded in 1983, the Purcell Quartet had their debut concert six months after forming, on 14 February 1984, at St John's, Smith Square, London. Tess Knighton, of The Times, wrote of the world class ensemble: "The 'minimalist' approach as adopted by the Purcell Quartet draws the listener into the textual and musical rhetoric in an intimate and immediate way, and with singers and players as excellent as these the experience is utterly convincing." BBC Music Magazine said that the ensemble's "playing is infectiously uninhibited and technically immaculate. . . of unqualified pleasure." The Purcell Quartet has toured extensively in the United States, Chile, Bolivia, Colombia, Peru, Turkey, as well as throughout Europe. In October 2001, they toured in Japan with a fully staged production of Monteverdi's opera, L'Orfeo. The cast of over forty starred the British tenor Mark Padmore. In 2004, the group celebrated their twentieth anniversary with a highly acclaimed concert in their hometown at Wigmore Hall.

The group was a champion of Purcell's music, as the name suggests, having recorded his works extensively. Additionally, they have performed music by Vivaldi, Corelli, Handel, Heinrich Ignaz Franz Biber, and others. Most recently, the group has focused on works of Johann Sebastian Bach and Dieterich Buxtehude.

The Purcell Quartet should not be confused with the Canadian Purcell String Quartet, which was active from 1968 till 1991. In a 2014 interview with Pamela Hickman, Richard Boothby stated the group was no longer performing.

== Members ==
The original members were:

- Robert Woolley – Harpsichord and organ
- Catherine Mackintosh – Violin
- Elizabeth Wallfisch – Violin
- Richard Boothby – Viola da gamba and cello

Only one change in members has occurred, when violinist Catherine Weiss replaced Wallfisch.
