= Géza Szilvay =

Hungarian violinist b. 1943

- Born: 13 September 1943 (age 82); Budapest
- Origin: Hungary
- Occupations: violinist, conductor
- Instrument: violin

Professor Géza Ellák Jenő Szilvay (born 13 September 1943) is a Hungarian violinist, teacher and conductor. He is the brother of the cellist Csaba Szilvay and the father of the violinist Réka Szilvay. With his brother Csaba Szilvay he founded the Helsinki Strings, a youth orchestra, in 1972. They conducted it until they retired in 2010.

== Biography ==
Szilvay was born in Budapest, Hungary in 1943, studied the violin at the Béla Bartók Conservatory and Pedagogics at the Budapest Music Academy where he graduated in 1966. He also studied law and political science at the ELTE University in Budapest and took his doctor's degree in 1970. In the 1960s, he played violin in the Budapest Symphony Orchestra and the first violin in the Szilvay family quartet, which was a well-known ensemble at the time in Hungary. He also taught and conducted the Children and Youth Orchestra of the Hungarian State Radio and Television. In 1971, Géza Szilvay started to teach the violin at the East Helsinki Music Institute, Finland and he served as Principal of the institute in 1984–2010. He also taught at the Sibelius Academy in Helsinki in 1978–2010. In 2012, he embarked on an ongoing project “International Minifiddlers” where his Colourstrings classes are broadcast in real time through a video conferencing system across the world.

Géza Szilvay is the creator of the internationally renowned and successful Colourstrings teaching method that has been documented in 42 publications. Over the years, he developed the method step by step constantly revising and adding new elements to the material. The Colourstrings method interlinks the development of musical hearing, musical intellect, instrumental technique and the emotional world of a child and applies the principle of reinforcement of perception through joint functioning of the senses. Right from the start, he added group lessons and string orchestra training to individual tutoring.

In 1972, Géza Szilvay founded The Helsinki Junior Strings orchestra (now known as The Helsinki Strings). Géza together with his brother Csaba Szilvay trained and conducted this string ensemble until 2010 and recorded 28 albums under Fuga, Finlandia, Apex and Warner labels. During these years, The Helsinki Strings have gained worldwide recognition through 38 international concert tours.

Szilvay's method of teaching soon had a strong impact on musical education in Finland. A large portion of his students have become professional musicians. He has inspired young parents and little kids with his TV programme “Mini Fiddlers in the Music Land” in 55 episodes broadcast in the 1970s and 1980s by the Finnish Broadcasting Company YLE. Violin pedagogical elements were slipped into the screenplay through visits to various places in the Music Land.

Géza Szilvay gained international recognition not only as a violin pedagogue and creator of the Colourstrings method but also as an educator and conductor of children's and youth orchestras. For 10 years, he headed the annual Prima Nota festival in Kuhmo, bringing together young string players from all over Finland and practising and performing age appropriate repertoire with them.

He has given more than 200 lectures and workshops on his teaching method and philosophy in Europe, China, South Korea, Taiwan, Japan, USA, Canada and Australia.

In the ongoing International Mini Fiddlers project, he teaches pupils, violin pedagogues and university students of many countries in weekly video conferences. In 2015, the participating countries include Australia, Denmark, England, Faroe Islands, Finland, Germany, Greenland, Israel, South Korea and the United States.

== Awards and recognition ==
Géza Szilvay has received many awards for his Work:

- Knight Order of the Finnish Lion 1981
- Culture Prize of Finland 1983
- Hungarian State Award for Cultural Activity 1990
- Fazer Music Prize 1993
- Culture Prize of Helsinki 1995
- "Pro Musica" Award 1999
- “Accent” Prize of the Association of Finnish Music Institutes 2005
- International Kodály Prize 2007
- Title of Professor awarded by the President of Finland in 2009
- Order of Merit of the Hungarian Republic in 2013
- Honorary Memberships: Danish Kodály Society 1988
- Finnish Kodály Society 1990
- British Kodály Society 1995
- Finnish Kantele Society 1999
- ESTA British Branch 2001
- Finnish Society for Music Education 2003
- International Kodály Society 2012
- ESTA Finland 2013
