= Harpsichord Concerto in A major, BWV 1055 =

Composition by Johann Sebastian Bach

The Harpsichord Concerto in A major, BWV 1055, is a concerto for harpsichord and string orchestra by Johann Sebastian Bach. It is the fourth keyboard concerto in Bach's autograph score of c. 1738.

== History ==
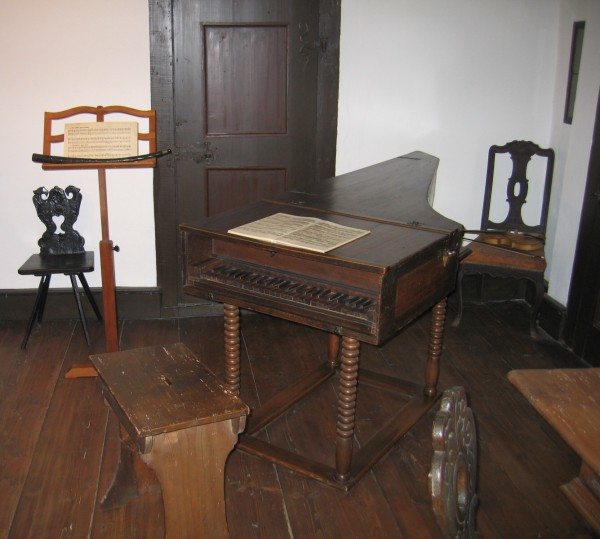
Single-manual harpsichord at the Bach House in Eisenach

Unlike Bach's other harpsichord concertos, BWV 1055 has no known precursors, either as an instrumental concerto or as a movement with obbligato organ in a cantata. It has generally been accepted that it is a reworking of a lost instrumental concerto, since Donald Francis Tovey first made the suggestion in 1935, when he proposed the oboe d'amore as the melody instrument. Additional reasons for the oboe d'amore have been given by Ulrich Siegele in 1957, Wilfried Fischer in 1970, Hans-Joachim Schulze in 1981 and Werner Breig in 1993; Schulze has dated the original concerto to 1721; and a reconstruction as a concerto for oboe d'amore and strings was prepared by Wilfried Fischer in 1970 for Volume VII/7 of the Neue Bach-Ausgabe edition. Another proposed instrument has been the viola d'amore, first suggested by Wilhelm Mohr in 1972; additional reasons for choosing the viola d'amore as a possible melody instrument were later given by Hans Schoop in 1985 and Kai Köpp in 2000, but in 2008 Pieter Dirksen gave reasons why he considered it unlikely to have been the original melody instrument.

== Structure ==
Scoring: harpsichord solo, violin I/II, viola, continuo (cello, violone)

=== I. Allegro ===
I. Allegro
Performed by the Advent Chamber Orchestra with Matthew Ganong (harpsichord)

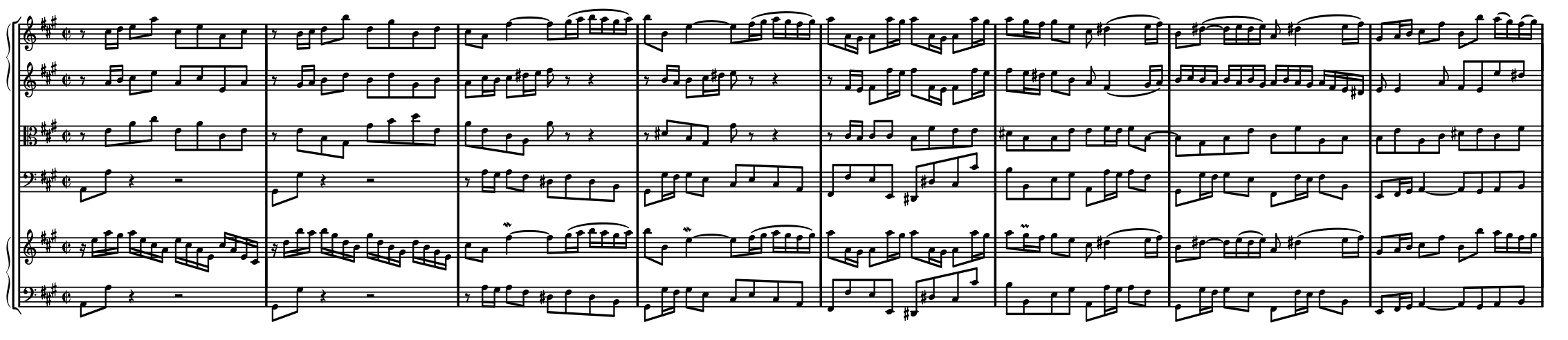

As Breig (1999) explains in his preface to the Neue Bach-Ausgabe edition, in compositional terms, BWV 1055 is one of the most concentrated and mature of Bach's concertos. The opening movement is an Allegro in A major and. It is written in da capo A–B–A′ form. Mostly light and nimble in spirit, the movement starts with a 16-bar ritornello broken up into two halves, each 8 bars long. In the first solo episode, the harpsichord introduces its own more sustained thematic material as well as semiquaver passagework derived from the end of the second half of the ritornello. All the harpsichord solo passages are based on or develop this thematic material.

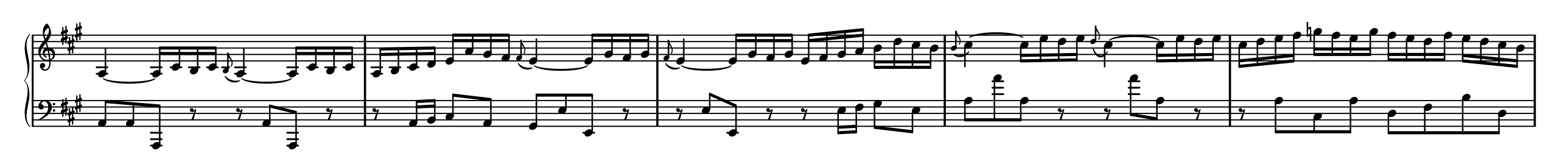

The two bar "motto" or Vordersatz opening the ritornello, consisting of rhythmic spiccato quaver figures in the strings and cascading broken chord semiquavers in the harpsichord, recurs throughout the movement, heralding solo episodes for the harpsichord. In the remainder of A section, the second episode is introduced by the two bar motto and followed by a reprise of the entire first half of the ritornello. Section B starts with an 8-bar solo episode and has three more solo episodes, punctuated by the two-bar ritornello motto. In the second bar of the first episode the sustained harpsichord material is heard in counterpoint to the motto theme in the strings, now starting in the middle of a bar. The second and third episode are 6 bars long in E major/F♯ minor and B minor/C♯ minor. The fourth and longest, which ends section B, is 12 bars long, starting in C♯ minor and ending back in the tonic key of A major. Section A′ starts at bar 79 with what sounds like a reprise of the ritornello—the two-bar motto in its original key; but, as Bach did in many of his concertos, it is interrupted by a solo episode for harpsichord—a variant of the episode introducing section B—before the true reprise of the complete ritornello that concludes the movement.

=== II. Larghetto ===
I. Larghetto
Performed by the Advent Chamber Orchestra with Matthew Ganong (harpsichord)

The slow movement of BWV 1055 is a highly expressive Larghetto in F♯ minor and 12/8 time. Although it does not have the dotted rhythms of a siciliano, it is close in spirit to this melancholy dance-form. The movement is pervaded by the chromatic fourth—both falling and rising—which is associated with the lamento. It is first heard in the descending bass line of the opening two bar ritornello, which frames the work. The material between the opening and closing the ritornellos is freely developed, but nevertheless has some elements of sonata form, most significantly a division into two parts with the second part starting in the relative major key (bars 3–13 and bars 14–36).

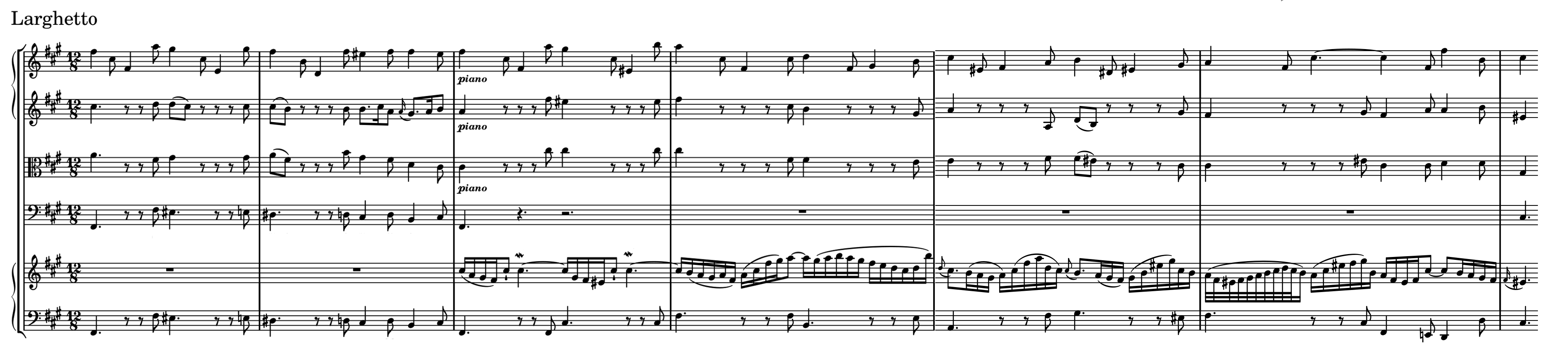

In the opening ritornello, the motifs in the first violin part involve a dramatic downward drop in register onto chromatic notes which break the harmony. The lilting rhythms of the first violin and the slower rhythms of the middle strings continue throughout the movement as a form of quasi-ostinato, repeating every two bars. As with the other concertos, the harpsichord plays as a continuo instrument during the orchestral ritornellos. In the autograph manuscript there is a figured bass in the continuo part, but it is known whether this was added later, so no further instruments beyond harpsichord and strings are required for performance. The harpsichord enters with its own material in the third bar. The material in a long four bar phrase contrasts with the monumental ritornello, with an expressive melodic line of legato semiquaver figures weaving between long sustained notes, either played off the beat or approached through sighing appoggiaturas. Further dynamical contrast is created by the lowest string parts falling silent, the bass line being provided just by the harpsichord: until halfway through the second part (bar 23), the accompaniment is provided only by the two violins and viola, marked piano. After the first solo episode, which modulates from F♯ minor to C sharp minor, a modified version of the ritornello is heard again, but now with the chromatic fourth rising in the bass line. It serves as a bridge passage during which the tonality modulates back to F♯ minor. At that point the true opening ritornello is heard once more, but now as a counterpoint to the beginning of the second solo episode of the harpsichord. Now extended to six bars, it leads up to a cadence in C♯ minor marking the end of the first part; the lowest strings briefly punctuate the cadence.

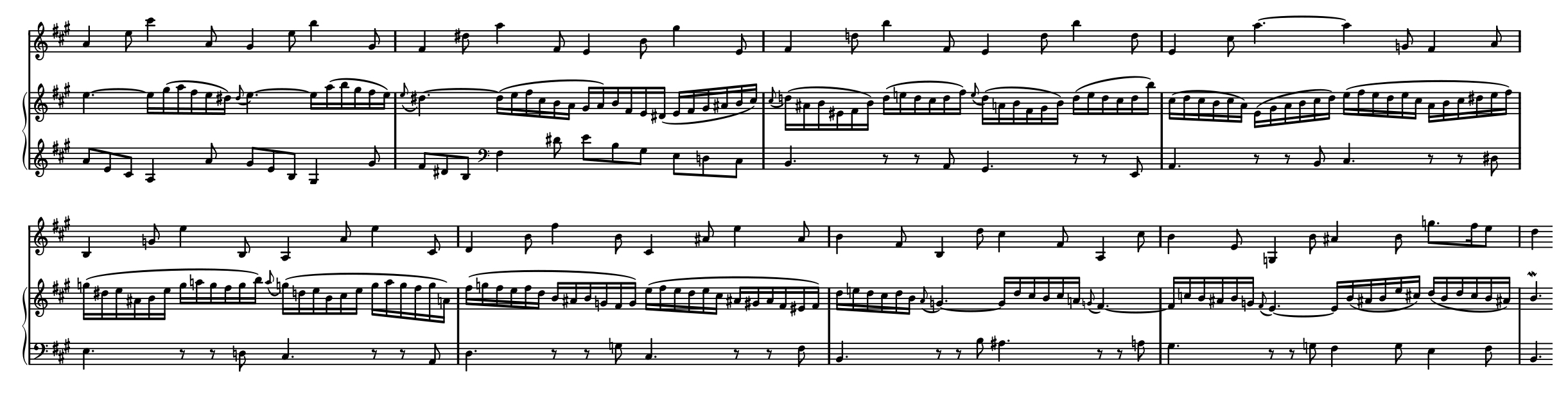

At bar 14, the beginning of the second part, the harpsichord begins a long 8-bar passage in the key of A major, the relative major key, introducing the Sietensatz its second thematic material. For two bars, in contrast to the first and second episodes, it plays sustained notes on the beat followed by semiquavers, with a left hand accompaniment of descending quaver triads in major keys. The accompanying ritornello figures in the upper and middle string accompaniment are inverted and played in unison during the first two bars. After two bars, the episode returns to the minor mode with two bars of semiquaver figures, which are repeated two bars later a minor third higher. This culminates in two bars where the music is at its most intense: the upper and middle strings play a variant of the original uninverted ritornello theme; in the harpsichord a descending chromatic fourth in the left hand plays beneath sighing figures reprised from the first episode which descend to a closing cadence in B minor.

At the cadence there is a full orchestral tutti—the lowest strings once more joining the ripieno section—in a version of the opening ritornello, but now with a rising chromatic fourth in the top notes of the first violin, as the key modulates to F♯ minor. The harpsichord enters with a five bar episode formed by three phrases starting on sustained notes off the beat: the first three bars long with a falling chromatic fourth in the left hand of the hand harpsichord; the second and third, fragmentary one bar statements. These lead into a full recapitulation of the eight-bar Seitensatz, but now with darker colours: the harpsichord starts lower down in the key of D major and the left hand part is joined by the lowest strings. At the end of this episode, back once more in the home tonality of F♯ minor, the movement concludes with a reprise of the opening ritornello.

=== III. Allegro ma non tanto ===
3. Allegro ma non tanto
Performed by the Advent Chamber Orchestra with Matthew Ganong (harpsichord)

The third movement of BWV 1055, marked Allegro ma non tanto, is in A major and the lively tempo of 3/8 time. Lightly scored and written in a similarly compact style to the first movement, it begins and ends with an orchestral ritornello; and, like the first movement, it is written in da capo A–B–A′ form. Section A occupies bars 1–82; section B, which starts in the dominant key of E major and ends in the mediant key of C♯ minor, comprises bars 83–138; and the reprise A′ takes place in bars 139–200.

The opening 24-bar ritornello is rhythmic and dance-like; it is broken up into four bar segments and contains a wide variety of thematic material. The main theme is played by the first violin part, which the harpsichord doubles in the right hand while playing the continuo bass in the left hand.

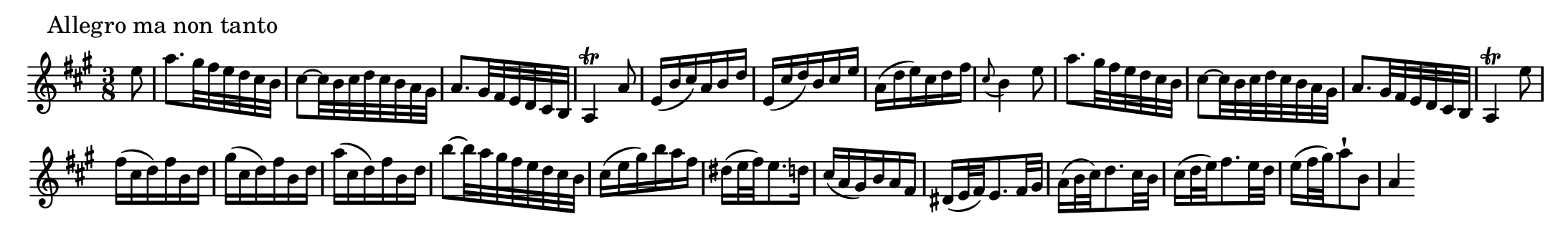

The florid style of the four-bar Vordersatz or "motto" of the ritornello is noteworthy for its flurries of rapid semidemiquaver scales. The Vordersatz is answered by a four bar phrase of semiquaver motifs in sequence. The remainder of the ritornello repeats this material until the concluding Epilog (bars 20–24) which has a sequence of one-bar figures in dotted rhythm incorporating joyful dactyls. The music of the ritornello, including the different quaver figures in the accompaniment, is re-used throughout the rest of the movement, the thematic material recurring mostly in shortened fragments.

After the ritornello, the harpsichord enters in the first of its solo episodes, 16 bars long. Its new melodic material contrasts with the ritornello, with sustained notes and graceful ornamentation typical of the galant style, at first accompanied only by repeated quavers in the left hand and upper strings.

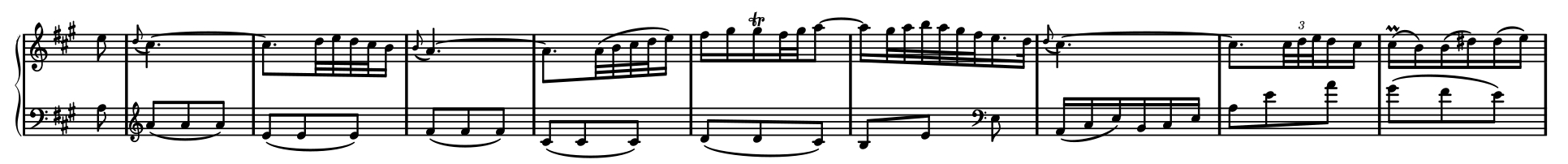

The ripieno section responds with one of the later segments of the ritornello; this is followed by a shorter episode for harpsichord which incorporates semiquaver motifs from the ritornello; and the ripieno responds with a variant of the semidemiquaver motto. After this dialogue, a second extended solo episode introduces new semiquaver triplet scale figures in the harpsichord, accompanied by detached quavers in the strings derived from the ritornello.

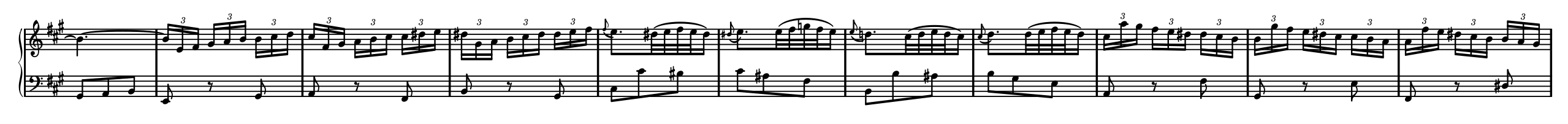

This is followed by another dialogue between soloist and ripieno based on the ritornello material. It ends with the harpsichord doubling the highest and lowest string parts—the "unison" method by which Bach incorporates the soloist in the ripieno—bringing section A to a close in the dominant key of E major.

In section B the thematic material from section A is developed more freely in the harpsichord part with semidemiquaver figures modified to semiquaver triplets. There is further dialogue between harpsichord and orchestra followed by an extended episode with semiquaver triplet passagework in the relative minor key, F♯ minor.

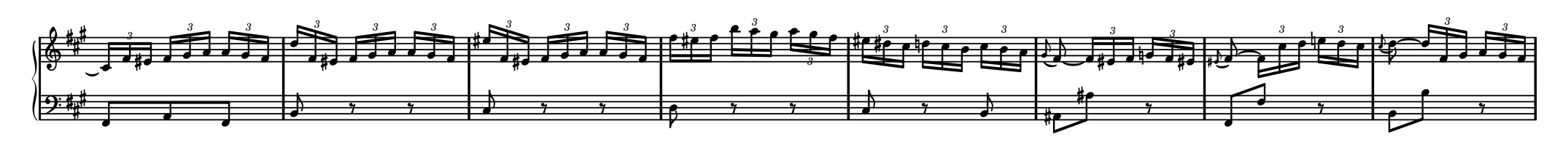

This is followed by an eight-bar "unison" ritornello modulating from F♯ minor to C♯ minor. Section B concludes with a second extended solo episode in the mediant key of C♯ minor, during which the orchestral ritornello material is heard over a harpsichord trill and in counterpoint before the cadence.

The recapitulation section A′, back in the tonic and dominant keys, begins with the first six bars of the ritornello, the harpsichord doubling the strings. This is interrupted by two last solo episodes for the harpsichord, abridged from section A and punctuated by a short ritornello motif in the strings. The movement concludes with a complete reprise of the opening ritornello.

== Selected recordings ==
=== With harpsichord ===
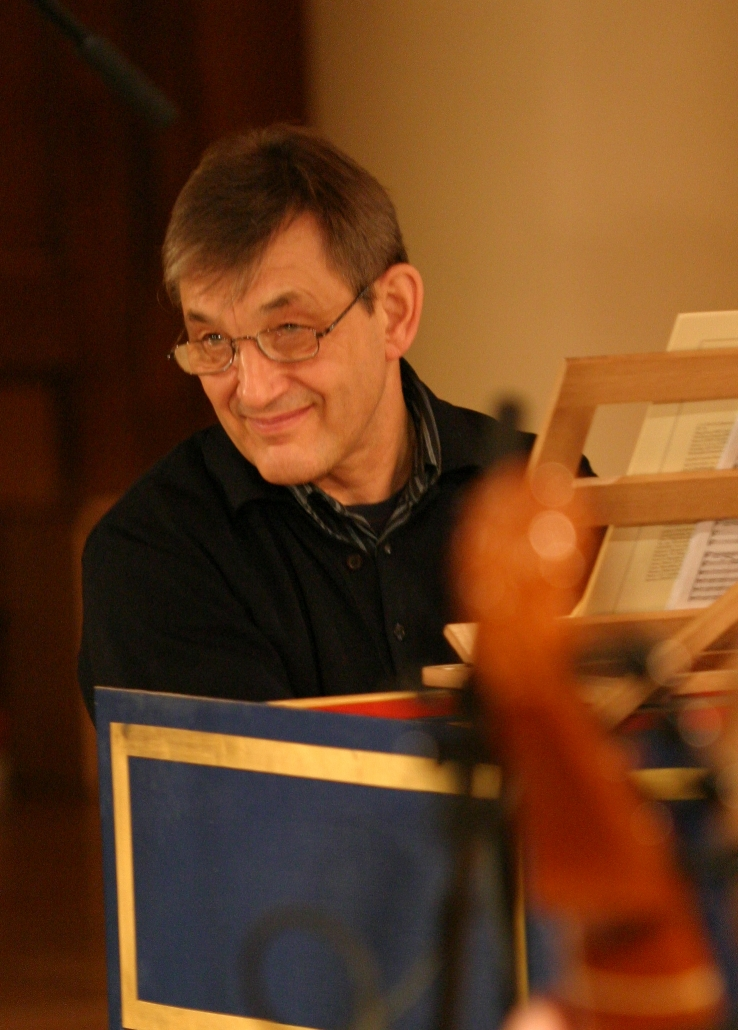
Trevor Pinnock

- Gustav Leonhardt, Leonhardt-Consort; 1968; Teldec 4509–97452–2
- Igor Kipnis, Stuttgarter Kammerorchester, Karl Münchinger; 1978; Intercord INT 820.738
- Trevor Pinnock, The English Concert; 1980; Archiv
- Christophe Rousset, Academy of Ancient Music, Christopher Hogwood; 2007; Decca Records
- Béatrice Martin, Les Folies Françoises, Patrick Cohen-Akenine; 2011; Cypres
- Gary Cooper, B'Rock; 2009–2010; Etcetera KTC 1477
- Matthew Halls, Retrospect Ensemble; 2011; Hyperion CKD410

=== With piano ===
- Tatiana Nikolayeva, Lithuanian Chamber Orchestra, Saulius Sondeckis; 1975; Doremi Records DHR 80568
- Maria João Pires, Gulbenkian Orchestra, Michel Corboz; 1974; Erato ECD 40001
- Abdel Rahman El Bacha, Ensemble Instrumental de Grenoble, Kurt Redel; 1984; Forlane UCD 16537
- Murray Perahia, Academy of St Martin in the Fields; 2000; Sony SK 89245
- David Fray, Deutsche Kammerphilharmonie Bremen; 2008; Virgin 213064 2
- Ramin Bahrami, Leipzig Gewandhaus Orchestra, Riccardo Chailly; 2009; Decca 478 2956 DH

=== Other versions ===
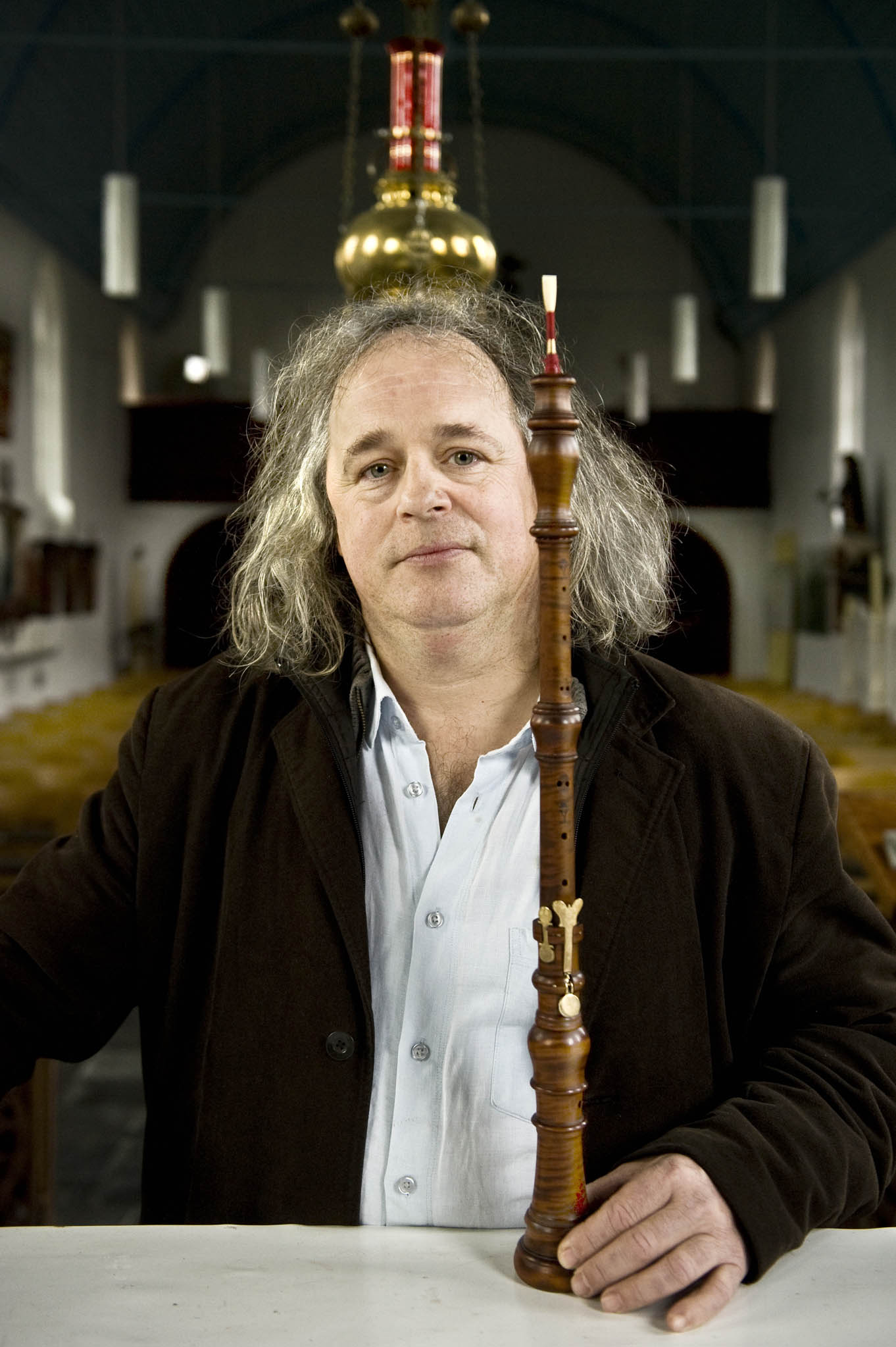
Marcel Ponseele

As concerto for oboe d'amore:

- Manfred Clement, Münchener Bach-Orchester, Karl Richter; 1980; Archiv Produktion 2533 452
- David Reichenberg, The English Concert, Trevor Pinnock; 1981; Archiv Produktion 471 720–2
- Heinz Holliger, Academy of St Martin in the Fields, Iona Brown; 1983; Philips 412 083-1
- Douglas Boyd, Chamber Orchestra of Europe; 1990; Deutsche Grammophon 4292 252
- Christian Hommel, Cologne Chamber Orchestra; 1997; Naxos (company) 8.554169
- Marcel Ponseele, il Gardellino; 2004; Accent ACC 24165

With trumpet and organ:

- Alison Balsom, Alina Ibragimova, Alastair Ross, Mark Caudle; 2006; EMI 5580472

As flute concerto:

- Jean-Pierre Rampal, Ars Rediviva, Milan Munclinger; 1984; CBS Masterworks Records MDK 46510

As violin concerto:

- Rachel Podger, Brecon Baroque; 2010; Channel Classics CCS SA 30910
- Alina Ibragimova, Arcangelo, Jonathan Cohen; 2014; Hyperion CDA68068

As viola concerto:

- Giorgio Sasso, Insieme Strumentale di Roma; 2011; Brilliant 94340

As concerto for organ and strings (Allegro and Larghetto, with Sinfonia from cantata BWV 35):

- Les Muffatti, Bart Jacobs (organ), Ramée (Outhere Music), 2019 (RAM1804)

== Televised ==
In 2024, Conrad Tao was televised on PBS performing a Bach keyboard concerto number four with Jonathon Heyward conducting for the program Lincoln Center Presents followed by an encore solo performance of Elliott Carter's "Caténaires" (2006).
