= Ode for St. Cecilia's Day (Handel) =

1739 cantata composed by George Frideric Handel

- Sacred choral composition by George Frideric Handel
- Portrait of Handel
- Catalogue: HWV 76
- Text: poem by John Dryden
- Composed: 1739
- Scoring: SATB soloists and choir; orchestra

Premiere
- Date: 22 November 1739
- Location: Theatre in Lincoln's Inn Fields, London

Ode for St. Cecilia's Day, HWV 76, is a cantata composed by George Frideric Handel in 1739. The title of the cantata refers to Saint Cecilia, the patron saint of musicians. The premiere was on 22 November 1739 at the Theatre in Lincoln's Inn Fields, London.

== Words ==
Handel sets a poem which the English poet John Dryden wrote in 1687. The main theme of the text is the Pythagorean theory of harmonia mundi, that music was a central force in the Earth's creation.

== Music ==
Ebenezer Prout has commented on various facets of Handel's instrumentation in the work and Edmund Bowles has written on Handel's use of timpani in the work.

== Movements ==
1. Overture: Larghetto e staccato—allegro—minuet
2. Recitative (tenor): From harmony, from heavenly harmony
3. Chorus: From harmony, from heavenly harmony
4. Aria (soprano): What passion cannot music raise and quell!
5. Aria (tenor) and Chorus: The trumpet's loud clangour
6. March
7. Aria (soprano): The soft complaining flute
8. Aria (tenor): Sharp violins proclaim their jealous pangs
9. Aria (soprano): But oh! What art can teach
10. Aria (soprano): Orpheus could lead the savage race
11. Recitative (soprano): But bright Cecilia raised the wonder higher
12. Grand Chorus with (soprano): As from the power of sacred lays

== Texts ==
=== From Harmony (Recit) ===
TENOR: From harmony, from heavenly harmony
This universal frame began.
When nature, underneath a heap
Of jarring atoms lay,
And could not heave her head.
The tuneful Voice, was heard from high,
Arise! Arise!
Arise ye more than dead!
Then cold, and hot, and moist, and dry,
In order to their stations leap!
And music's power obey!
And music's power obey!

=== From Harmony (Chorus) ===
CHORUS: From harmony, from heavenly harmony,
This universal frame began.
Through all the compass of the notes it ran,
The diapason closing full in man.

=== What Passion Cannot Music Raise and Quell ===
SOPRANO: What passion cannot music raise, and quell?
When Jubal struck the chorded shell,
His listening brethren stood 'round.
And wondering on their faces fell,
To worship that celestial sound!
Less than a god they thought there could not dwell
Within the hollow of that shell
That spoke so sweetly and so well.
What passion cannot Music raise and quell?

=== The Trumpet's Loud Clangour ===
TENOR: The trumpet's loud clangour excites us to arms,
With shrill notes of anger and mortal alarms,
The double-double-double beat,
Of the thund'ring drum,
Cries hark! Hark! Cries hark the foes come!
Charge! Charge! Charge! Charge!
'Tis too late, 'tis too late to retreat!
Charge 'tis too late, too late to retreat!

=== The Soft Complaining Flute ===
SOPRANO: The soft complaining flute
In dying notes discovers
The woes of hopeless lovers,
Whose dirge is whispered by the warbling lute.

=== Sharp Violins Proclaim ===
TENOR: Sharp violins proclaim,
Their jealous pangs,
And desperation!
Fury, frantic indignation!
Depth of pains, and height of passion,
For the fair disdainful dame!

=== But Oh! What Art Can Teach ===
SOPRANO: But oh! what art can teach,
What human voice can reach
The sacred organ's praise?
Notes inspiring holy love,
Notes that wing their heavenly ways
To join the choirs above.

=== Orpheus Could Lead The Savage Race ===
SOPRANO: Orpheus could lead the savage race,
And trees uprooted left their place
Sequacious of the lyre:
But bright Cecilia raised the wonder higher:
When to her Organ vocal breath was given
An Angel heard, and straight appeared –
Mistaking Earth for Heaven.

=== As From The Power Of Sacred Lays ===
SOPRANO: As from the power of sacred lays
The spheres began to move,
And sung the great Creator's praise
To all the blest above;
So when the last and dreadful hour
This crumbling pageant shall devour,
The trumpet shall be heard on high,

CHORUS: The dead shall live, the living die,
And music shall untune the sky

== Recordings ==
- Ode for St Cecilia's Day, (2018, CD): Carolyn Sampson, soprano; Ian Bostridge, tenor; Polish Radio Choir, Dunedin Consort, conducted by John Butt; Linn Records – CKD578
- Ode for St Cecilia's Day, (2004, CD): Carolyn Sampson, soprano; James Gilchrist, tenor; Choir & Orchestra of The King's Consort, conducted by Robert King; Hyperion Records – CDA67463
- Ode for St Cecilia's Day, (2003, CD): Felicity Lott, soprano; Anthony Rolfe Johnson, tenor; Crispian Steele-Perkins, trumpet; Lisa Beznosiuk, flute; The English Concert And Choir, conducted by Trevor Pinnock; Deutsche Grammophon — Archiv Produktion – 474 549-2
- Ode for St Cecilia's Day, (1984/2008, CD): Monika Frimmer, soprano; Eberhard Bǔchner, tenor; members of the choir of the Landestheater Halle, of the Hallischen Chorsolisten and the Collegium vocale; the Händel-Festspielorchester Halle, conducted by Christian Kluttig; Berlin Classics — 0013992BC
- Ode for St Cecilia's Day, (1978, CD): Felicity Palmer, soprano; Anthony Rolfe Johnson, tenor; Bachchor Stockholm, Concentus musicus Wien, conducted by Nikolaus Harnoncourt; Teldec – 40630-12319-2
- Ode for St Cecilia's Day, (1968, LP): April Cantelo, soprano; Ian Partridge, tenor; Choir of King's College, Cambridge, Academy of St. Martin in the Fields, conducted by Sir David Willcocks; Argo – ZRG 563

== See also ==
- Hail! Bright Cecilia
