= Trevor Pinnock =

English harpsichordist and conductor (born 1946)

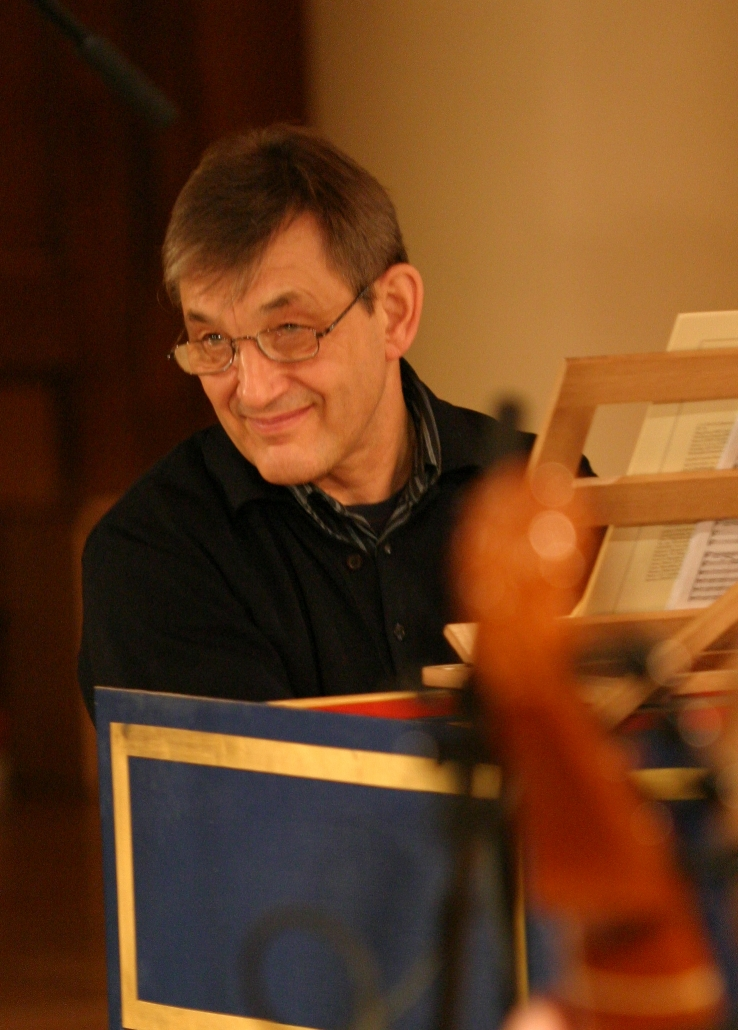
Pinnock in December 2006

Trevor David Pinnock CBE (born 16 December 1946 in Canterbury, England) is a British harpsichordist and conductor.

He is best known for his association with the period-performance orchestra The English Concert, which he helped found and directed from the keyboard for over 30 years in baroque and classical music. He is a former artistic director of Canada's National Arts Centre Orchestra and founded The Classical Band in New York.

Since his resignation from The English Concert in 2003, Pinnock has continued his career as a conductor, appearing with major orchestras and opera companies around the world. He has also performed and recorded as a harpsichordist in solo and chamber music and conducted and otherwise trained student groups at conservatoires. Trevor Pinnock won a Gramophone Award for his recording of Bach's Brandenburg Concertos with the European Brandenburg Ensemble, an occasional orchestra formed to mark his 60th birthday.

== Biography and career ==
=== Early life ===
Trevor Pinnock was born in Canterbury, the second of four siblings. His grandfather had played in the Canterbury Silver Band. His father was Kenneth Alfred Thomas Pinnock. At the time of Trevor's birth he was teaching History at the local grammar school. He went into publishing two years after Trevor's birth. His mother, Joyce Edith, née Muggleton, was an amateur singer. In Canterbury, the Pinnock family lived near the pianist Ronald Smith, from whose sister Pinnock had piano lessons. He became a chorister at Canterbury Cathedral when he was seven, attending the choir school from 1956 to 1961 and subsequently Simon Langton Grammar School for Boys. After receiving instruction in piano and organ, he served as a church organist; by the time he was 15, he began to play the harpsichord. At age 19, he won a Foundation Scholarship to the Royal College of Music to study organ and he also studied harpsichord, winning prizes for performance on both instruments. His teachers were Ralph Downes and Millicent Silver. A strong early influence was Gustav Leonhardt, though he did not study with him.

=== Instrumentalist ===
As a harpsichordist, Pinnock toured Europe with the Academy of St Martin in the Fields. While a student at the RCM, he was told by the registrar, John Stainer, that it would be impossible to make a living as a harpsichordist. He made his London debut at the Royal Festival Hall in 1966 with the Galliard Harpsichord Trio, which he co-founded with Stephen Preston, flute, and Anthony Pleeth, cello. At this stage, they were playing baroque music on modern instruments. His solo harpsichord debut was in 1968 at the Purcell Room in London.

To maximise his possibilities for work early on in his career, he included in his repertoire not only the regular baroque repertoire, but also modern harpsichord concertos, including Roberto Gerhard's concerto for harpsichord, percussion and strings, Manuel de Falla's concerto for harpsichord, Frank Martin's Petite symphonie concertante for harp, harpsichord, piano and double string orchestra and Francis Poulenc's Concert Champêtre. Pinnock and Maxim Vengerov toured together in 2000, with Vengerov taking up the baroque violin for the first time and Pinnock taking up the modern grand piano. These concerts consisted of a first half of harpsichord and baroque violin, followed by a second half of piano and modern violin.

=== The English Concert ===
In November 1972 the Galliard Trio expanded to become The English Concert, an orchestra specialising in performances of baroque and classical music on period instruments. The orchestra initially started with seven members but soon grew in size. The decision to move to period performance was taken for a number of reasons:

What I really had in mind was a journey of discovery into the unknown. Although I felt there were excellent interpretations of baroque music performed on modern instruments, I sensed that we'd come to the end of the road – and yet I knew that there were still discoveries to be made. I was thinking about the interesting experiments made by Nikolaus Harnoncourt and Gustav Leonhardt, although I knew we'd have to experiment in our own way. It was a huge challenge; playing period instruments wasn't as easy as it is today, and finding out their secrets was a difficult process. Nowadays an extraordinarily high technical level has been achieved and the upcoming generations don't have any of the problems we pioneers faced. We cleared the way.

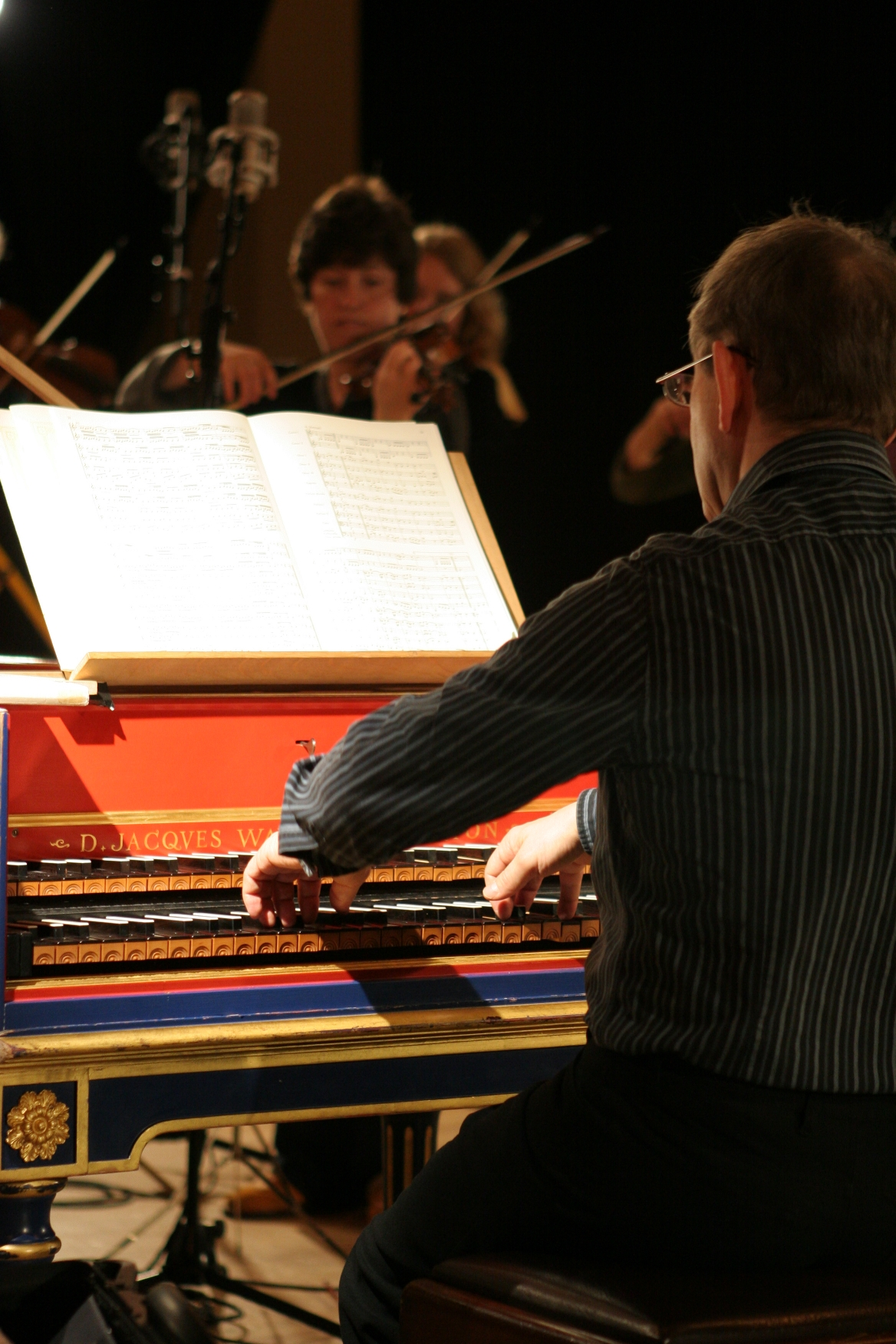
Pinnock at the harpsichord

Pinnock was at the forefront of the period performance movement and the revitalisation of the baroque repertoire; the reaction of Leonard Bernstein to his performances is typical: "In my opinion, the work of the conductor Trevor Pinnock in this area is particularly exciting – his performances of Bach and Handel make me jump out of my seat!"

The English Concert's London debut was at the English Bach Festival in 1973. In 1975, Pinnock played the harpsichord in the first-ever performance of Rameau's last opera, Les Boréades, under John Eliot Gardiner. He toured North America with The English Concert for the first time in 1983; he had earlier spent two periods as Artist in Residence at Washington University in St. Louis. His debut at The Proms was in 1980; he later directed Handel's oratorio Solomon in 1986 and many other large-scale works with his orchestra. They toured worldwide and made numerous recordings, Pinnock directing "with a characteristic energy and enthusiasm which are readily communicated to audiences." The Choir of the English Concert was at first an ad-hoc group of singers assembled as needed, originally in 1983 for the first 20th-century performance of Rameau's Acante et Céphise; it became an established choir for a period from the mid-1990s at the time they were performing Bach's Mass in B minor. This allowed the ensemble to regularly perform baroque operas, oratorios and other vocal works; a series of Bach's major choral works followed.

He directed The English Concert, usually from the harpsichord or chamber organ, for over 30 years, deciding, with the other orchestra members, to hand it over to violinist Andrew Manze in 2003. He explained the decision as follows:

There are other things I want to develop – or rather come back to. Having done The English Concert for 18–20 weeks per year, and guest conducting the rest of the time, I'd sacrificed playing the harpsichord rather more than I wanted to. I had to make a decision to move forward: there were certain solo projects I wanted to do, and I wanted to make the decision now rather than wait until after I am 60 and it's too late to do half of them. [...] There's a wealth of keyboard repertoire I want to revisit. I especially want to go back to the rich English repertoire such as Tomkins, Byrd, Bull and Gibbons.

=== Other conducting projects ===
In 1989 Pinnock founded The Classical Band in New York, signing an 18-disc recording contract with Deutsche Grammophon before the ensemble's first rehearsal. He led the group in performances of the classical and romantic repertoire from Haydn to Mendelssohn on period instruments, including playing as fortepiano soloist. After a disappointing series of concerts, he resigned in 1990 and was succeeded by Bruno Weil.

From 1991 to 1996 he was artistic director and principal conductor of the National Arts Centre Orchestra in Ottawa, a group he had first directed in 1985. He subsequently served as its artistic advisor during the 1996–1997 and 1997–1998 seasons, including a tour of the US with the performance and recording of Beethoven's 1st and 5th piano concertos with Grigory Sokolov as soloist. He has made occasional return visits to the orchestra since relinquishing his formal position with them.

==== Guest conducting ====
He has appeared frequently as a guest conductor with many of the world's leading orchestras, including the Boston, City of Birmingham, San Francisco and Detroit symphony orchestras, the Saint Paul, Los Angeles and Mito chamber orchestras, the Freiburger Barockorchester, Philharmonia Baroque Orchestra, Mozarteum Orchestra of Salzburg, Berlin Philharmoniker, Vienna Philharmonic Orchestra, Austro-Hungarian Haydn Orchestra, the Chicago Symphony Orchestra and London Philharmonic Orchestra and at the Tanglewood, Mostly Mozart and Salzburg festivals. He is a regular guest conductor of the Leipzig Gewandhaus Orchestra and Deutsche Kammerphilharmonie

He made his Metropolitan Opera debut in 1988 conducting Handel's opera Giulio Cesare, the same year he made his debut at the Salzburg Festival with Handel's Messiah. He conducted Opera Australia and Michael Chance in Handel's Rinaldo at the Sydney Opera House in 2005. He also played William Babell's virtuoso harpsichord transcriptions with some of the arias (which Babell claimed were of Handel's actual improvisations).

=== Recent years ===
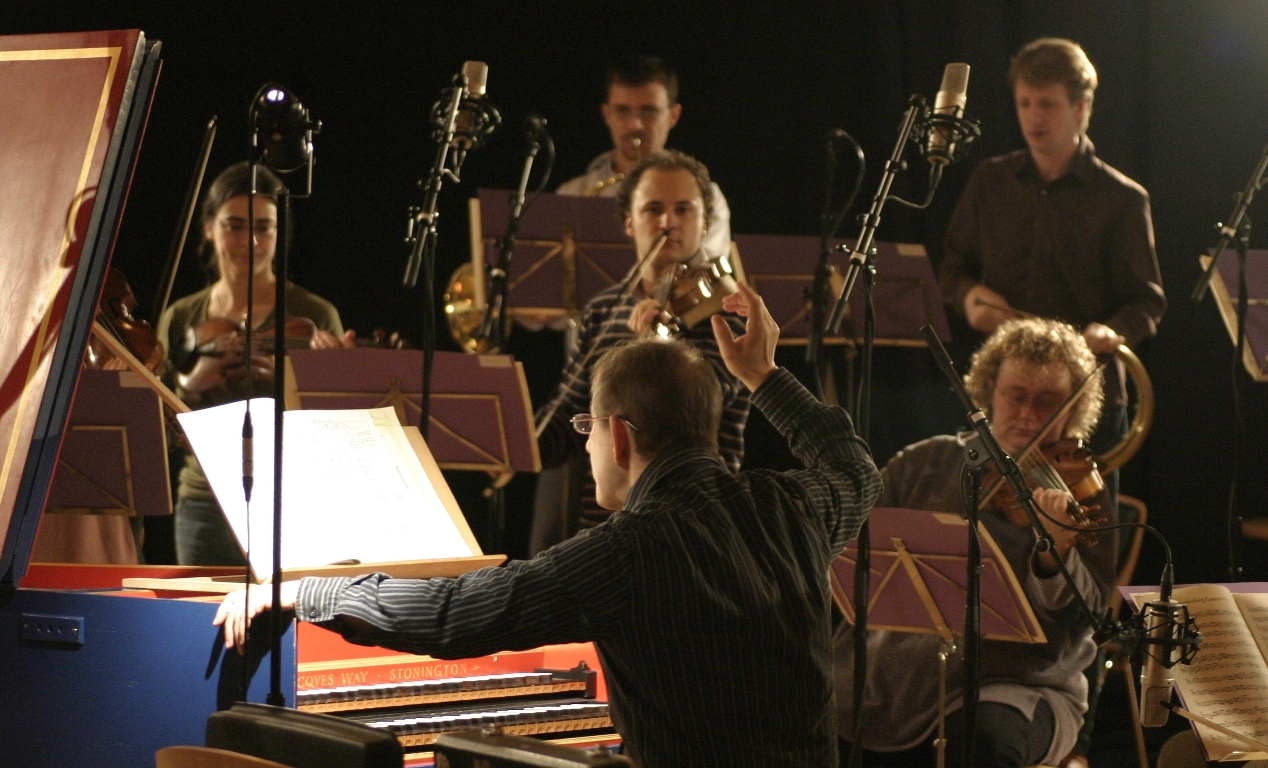
Pinnock directs the European Brandenburg Ensemble.

Since resigning his position with The English Concert, Pinnock has divided his time between performing as a harpsichordist and conducting both modern- and period-instrument orchestras. He has also taken an interest in educational projects.

In 2004 he commissioned modern harpsichord music by English composer John Webb, whose Surge (2004) "is built up over an implacable rhythmic repeat-figure. Though neither is explicitly tonal, each skilfully avoids the merely percussive effect that the harpsichord's complex overtones can all too easily impart to more densely dissonant music." He has also played the same composer's Ebb (2000), which "comprises a spasmodic discourse against a manic background of descending scale patterns like a kind of out-of-kilter change-ringing".

He toured Europe and the Far East in 2007 with the European Brandenburg Ensemble, a baroque orchestra, formed to mark his 60th birthday by recording Bach's Brandenburg Concertos and performing popular baroque music. Its recording of the concertos won the Gramophone Award for Baroque Instrumental in 2008. The band was not a permanent orchestra, but planned to reconvene in 2011 when Bach's St John Passion was to be the focus of their work.

Pinnock's educational work takes place both in the United Kingdom and elsewhere. It includes being principal guest conductor of the Royal Academy of Music's Concert Orchestra, taking masterclasses or workshops at other British universities, and conducting the orchestras of such establishments as Mozarteum University of Salzburg and The Hong Kong Academy for Performing Arts. He has also taught a handful of harpsichordists including Lars Ulrik Mortensen, Nicholas Parle, Carole Cerasi and Julian Perkins.

== Degrees, honours and awards ==
Pinnock gained ARCM Hons (organ) (1965), FRCM (1996), and Hon. FRAM (1988). His honorary doctorates include those from the University of Ottawa (D. University) in 1993, the University of Kent (DMus) in 1995, and the University of Sheffield (DMus) in 2005.

He was appointed a Commander of the Order of the British Empire in 1992 and an Officier of the French Ordre des Arts et des Lettres in 1998.

Pinnock received three nominations for Grammy Awards for his recordings of Handel's Coronation Anthems (1984), Vivaldi's Gloria and Alessandro Scarlatti's Dixit Dominus (1989) and Handel's Messiah (1990).

== Recordings ==
Each original release is listed. Years are those of recording. Recordings on Archiv Produktion unless otherwise indicated.

=== Solo harpsichord ===
==== By composer ====
- J. S. Bach: toccatas 910 & 912, prelude and fugue in A minor BWV 894, fantasia in C minor BWV 906, Chromatic Fantasia and Fugue BWV 903 (1978)
- J. S. Bach: toccatas 911, 913–916 (1977)
- J. S. Bach: Partitas for harpsichord BWV 825–830 (1985)
- J. S. Bach: Partitas for harpsichord BWV 825–830, Hänssler (1998–1999)
- J. S. Bach: Goldberg Variations BWV 988 (1980)
- J. S. Bach: Italian Concerto BWV 971, concerto after Vivaldi (op.3 no.9) BWV 972 and French Overture BWV 831 (1979)
- J. S. Bach: French suite no.5 BWV 816, English suite no.3 BWV 808, chromatic fantasia and fugue BWV 903 and preludes and fugues BWV 846, 876, 881 from The Well-Tempered Clavier (1992)
- J. S. Bach: The Well-Tempered Clavier I, Deutsche Grammophon (2020)
- J. S. Bach: The Well-Tempered Clavier II, Deutsche Grammophon (2022)
- L. Couperin: Pièces de Clavecin, Plectra Music, Inc. (2017)
- Handel: harpsichord suites and chaconne HWV 434, 435, 436, 438, 441 (1983)
- Rameau: Complete harpsichord works, CRD Records (1988)
- Rameau: Les Cyclopes (Suites in A minor and E minor), Avie Records (2005)
- D. Scarlatti: Sonatas Kk. 46, 87, 95, 99, 124, 201, 204a, 490, 491, 492, 513, 520, 521, CRD Records (1981)
- D. Scarlatti: Sonatas Kk. 460, 461, 478, 479, 502, 516, 517, 518, 519, 529, 544, 545, 546, 547 (1986)

==== Collections ====
- 16th Century English Keyboard Music, CRD Records (1976)
- A Choice Collection of Lessons and Ayres (17th and 18th Century English Keyboard Music), CRD Records (1978)
- At the Victoria and Albert Museum, CRD Records (1974)
- The Harmonious Blacksmith: Favourite Harpsichord Works (1983)
- Suites by Purcell and Handel, Sonatas by Haydn, Wigmore Hall Live (2009)

=== Harpsichord concertos ===
- J. S. Bach: harpsichord concertos BWV 1052–1058, concertos for 2, 3 and 4 harpsichords 1060–1065 (Kenneth Gilbert, Lars Ulrik Mortensen and Nicholas Kraemer, harpsichords 2–4) (1979–1981)
- J. S. Bach: concerto for harpsichord, violin and flute BWV 1044 (on the recordings Triple Concerto BWV 1044-Overture BWV 1069 and 3 concerti) (1978 and 1984)
- J. S. Bach: Brandenburg Concerto No. 5 BWV 1050 (on his two recordings of the Brandenburg concertos) (1979–1982 and 2006)
- Sons of Bach's harpsichord concertos: C. P. E. Bach: Wq.14 and 43 no.5; J. C. Bach/Mozart: K.107 no.1, CRD Records (1974)
- Arne: Harpsichord concerto no.5 in G minor (on A Grand Concert of Musick) (1979)
- Haydn: Concerto for Harpsichord and Orchestra Hob. XVIII:11 (on Haydn: concertos and Pachelbel: Canon and Gigue) (1985)
- Leigh: Concertino for Harpsichord and String Orchestra with Nicholas Braithwaite conducting the London Philharmonic Orchestra; he also plays in Leigh's Midsummer Night's Dream suite, Lyrita (1980)
- Poulenc: Concert champêtre with Seiji Ozawa conducting the Boston Symphony Orchestra, Deutsche Grammophon (live recording) (1991)

=== Chamber music ===
- J. C. Bach: 3 Quintets, Sextet (also playing fortepiano and square piano) with Lisa Beznosiuk, transverse flute, David Reichenberg, oboe, Anthony Halstead and David Cox, horns, Simon Standage, violin, Trevor Jones, viola and Anthony Pleeth, violoncello (1988)
- J. S. Bach: sonatas for violin and harpsichord BWV 1014–1019, 1019a with Rachel Podger (violin) and sonatas for violin and continuo BWV 1021, 1023 with the addition of Jonathan Manson (viola da gamba), Channel Classics Records (2000)
- J. S. Bach: sonatas for viola da gamba and harpsichord BWV 1027–1029, 1030b (an early version of the flute sonata) with Jonathan Manson (viola da gamba), Avie Records (2006)
- J. S. Bach: sonatas for flute and harpsichord BWV 1030–1032 with Stephen Preston (baroque flute) and sonatas for flute and continuo BWV 1033–1035 with the addition of Jordi Savall (viola da gamba), CRD Records (1975)
- J. S. Bach: sonatas for flute and harpsichord BWV 1020, 1030–1032 with Jean-Pierre Rampal (modern flute) and sonatas for flute and continuo BWV 1033–1035 with the addition of Roland Pidoux (cello), CBS Records (1985)
- J. S. Bach: sonatas for flute and harpsichord BWV 1020, 1030–1032 with Emmanuel Pahud (modern flute), sonatas for flute and continuo BWV 1033–1035 with the addition of Jonathan Manson (cello) and sonata for two flutes and continuo BWV 1039 with the further addition of Silvia Careddu (modern flute), EMI Classics (2008)
- Corelli: Trio Sonatas (also playing organ) with Simon Standage and Micaela Comberti, violin, Anthony Pleeth, violoncello and Nigel North, archlute and theorbo (1987)
- Handel: Trio Sonatas with Simon Standage and Micaela Comberti, violin, Lisa Beznosiuk, flute and Anthony Pleeth, violoncello (1985)
- Rameau: Pièces de Clavecin en Concerts with Rachel Podger (baroque violin) and Jonathan Manson (viola da gamba), Channel Classics Records (2002)
- Soler: Six Concertos for Two Keyboard Instruments (also playing fortepiano) with Kenneth Gilbert (1979)
- Wesley: Duet for Organ in C major with Simon Preston on his recording Early English Organ Music (1986)
- "The Punckes Delight" and other seventeenth-century English music for viol (bass viol and lyra viol) and keyboard (virginal and chamber organ) with Jordi Savall, Argo Records (1978)
- The Flute King: Music from the court of Frederick the Great. Featuring Emmanuel Pahud on flute. One disc of flute concertos and one of flute sonatas; Trevor Pinnock directs the Kammerakademie Potsdam orchestra and plays harpsichord continuo. Jonathan Manson plays cello continuo, EMI Classics (2011)

=== Orchestral works with The English Concert ===
Trevor Pinnock generally directs while playing harpsichord continuo.

==== By composer ====
- C. P. E. Bach: 6 symphonies for strings, Wq.182 (1979)
- C. P. E. Bach: flute concertos Wq.166 and 167 (Stephen Preston, flute) (1980)
- J. S. Bach: Brandenburg Concertos (1982)
- J. S. Bach: Orchestral Suites nos. 1 & 3 (1978)
- J. S. Bach: concerto for harpsichord, violin and flute BWV 1044 and Orchestral Suite no. 2 (Trevor Pinnock, harpsichord; Simon Standage, violin; Stephen Preston, flute) (1978)
- J. S. Bach: Orchestral Suite no. 4 and Brandenburg Concerto No. 5 (1979)
- J. S. Bach: Orchestral Suites and cantata sinfonias BWV 42, 52, 110, 174, 249 (1995)
- J. S. Bach: single and double violin concertos (Simon Standage, Elizabeth Wilcock, violins) (1983)
- J. S. Bach: 3 concerti: concerto for harpsichord, violin and flute BWV 1044, concerto for oboe and violin BWV 1060 and concerto for oboe d'amore BWV 1055 (Simon Standage, violin; David Reichenberg, oboe and oboe d'amore; Lisa Beznosiuk, flute; Trevor Pinnock, harpsichord) (1984)
- Boyce: 8 Symphonies (1986)
- Corelli: 12 concerti grossi op.6 (1988)
- Fasch: Concertos and Orchestral Suite (1995)
- Handel: 6 concerti grossi op.3 (1984)
- Handel: 12 concerti grossi op.6 (1982)
- Handel: Water Music (1983)
- Handel: Music for the Royal Fireworks and concerti a due cori nos.2 and 3 (no.1 is on Christmas Concertos) (1985)
- Handel: Music for the Royal Fireworks (original version of 1749), concertos, occasional suite (1995)
- Handel: Concerto grosso Alexander's Feast HWV 318, Sonata a 5 HWV 288, Oboe concertos HWV 287, 301, 302a (Simon Standage, violin; David Reichenberg, oboe) (1984)
- Handel: Overtures from Samson, il pastor fido, Agrippina, Alceste, Saul and Teseo (1986)
- Handel: Organ concertos op.4, op.7 and HWV 295, 296, 304 (Simon Preston, organ) (1984)
- Handel: Coronation Anthems (with Simon Preston conducting the choir of Westminster Abbey) (1982)
- Handel: Dettingen Te Deum, Dettingen Anthem (with Simon Preston conducting the choir of Westminster Abbey) (Stephen Varcoe, bass; Christopher Tipping, contralto; Harry Christophers, tenor; Michael Pearce, bass) (1984)
- Handel: Ode for St. Cecilia's Day (Felicity Lott, soprano; Anthony Rolfe Johnson, tenor) (1985)
- Handel: Italian cantatas: Silete venti HWV 242; Cecilia, volgi un sguardo HWV 89 (Jennifer Smith, soprano; John Elwes, tenor) (1982)
- Handel: Messiah (Arleen Auger, soprano; Anne Sofie von Otter, contralto; Michael Chance, countertenor; Howard Crook, tenor; John Tomlinson, bass) (1988)
- Handel: Belshazzar (Anthony Rolfe Johnson, tenor; Arleen Auger, soprano; James Bowman, countertenor; Catherine Robbin, mezzo-soprano; David Wilson-Johnson, baritone; Nicolas Robertson, tenor; Richard Wistreich, bass) (1990)
- Handel/Mozart: Acis und Galatea K.566 (Barbara Bonney, soprano; Jamie MacDougall, tenor; Markus Schäfer, tenor; John Tomlinson, bass) (1991)
- Handel: Tamerlano (Monica Bacelli, mezzo-soprano; Tom Randle, tenor; Elisabeth Norberg-Schulz, soprano; Graham Pushee, countertenor; Anna Bonitatibus, mezzo-soprano; Antonio Abete, bass), CD: Avie Records (live recording, London), DVD: Arthaus (live recording, Halle) (2001)
- Haydn: concertos for oboe, trumpet and harpsichord (Hob.XVIII:11) (Paul Goodwin, oboe; Mark Bennett, trumpet; Trevor Pinnock, harpsichord) (1985)
- Haydn: violin concertos; Salomon: Romance for violin (Simon Standage, violin) (1989)
- Haydn: Stabat Mater (Patricia Rozario, soprano; Catherine Robbin, mezzosoprano; Anthony Rolfe Johnson, tenor; Cornelius Hauptmann, bass) (1990)
- Haydn: missa in angustiis "Nelson Mass", te deum (Felicity Lott, soprano; Carolyn Watkinson, contralto; Maldwyn Davies, tenor; David Wilson-Johnson, bass) (1987)
- Haydn: missa Sancti Nicolai, Theresienmesse (Nancy Argenta, soprano; Catherine Robbin, contralto; Michael Schade, tenor; Alastair Miles, bass) (1993)
- Haydn: symphonies le matin, le midi, le soir, (nos. 6, 7, 8) (1987)
- Haydn: Sturm und Drang symphonies (nos. 26, 35, 38, 39, 41, 42, 43, 44, 45, 46, 47, 48, 49, 50, 51, 52, 58, 59, 65) (1989–1990)
- Mozart: complete symphonies (1993–1995)
- Mozart: Krönungsmesse "Coronation Mass", Exsultate jubilate and Vesperae solennes de confessore (Barbara Bonney, soprano; Catherine Wyn Rogers, contralto; Jamie MacDougall, tenor; Stephen Gadd, bass) (1994)
- Purcell: Dido and Aeneas (Anne Sofie von Otter, mezzo-soprano; Stephen Varcoe, bass; Lynne Dawson, soprano; Nigel Rogers, tenor; Elisabeth Priday, soprano; Carol Hall, mezzo-soprano; Sarah Leonard, soprano; Kym Amps, soprano) (1989)
- Purcell: Dioclesian and Timon of Athens (Nancy Argenta, soprano; Ann Monoyios, soprano; Paul Agnew, tenor; Richard Edgar-Wilson, tenor; Stephen Gadd, bass; Brian Bannatyne-Scott, bass; Simon Birchall, bass; Lawrence Wallington, bass; Christopher Foster, bass) (1995)
- Purcell: King Arthur (Nancy Argenta, soprano; Linda Perillo, soprano; Julia Gooding, soprano; Jamie MacDougall, tenor; Mark Tucker, tenor; Brian Bannatyne-Scott, bass; Gerald Finley, bass) (1991)
- Purcell: Odes: Come, ye sons of art, away; Welcome to all the pleasures; Of old, when heroes thought it base (the Yorkshire feast song) (Jennifer Smith, soprano; Elisabeth Priday, soprano; Kym Amps, soprano; Michael Chance, countertenor; Timothy Wilson, countertenor; John Mark Ainsley, tenor; Michael George, bass; Stephen Richardson, bass) (1989)
- Purcell: choral works with the choir of Christ Church, Oxford, conducted by Simon Preston (1981)
- Telemann: 3 Orchestral Suites for 3 oboes and bassoon TWV 55: C6 and B10, for 2 hunting horns TWV 55: D19 (1993)
- Telemann: 2 Orchestral Suites for 3 oboes & bassoon TWV 55: g4, for oboe, trumpet, bassoon, 2 violins, viola and cello TWV 55: D1, Concerto in D Major for 3 trumpets and 2 oboes TWV 54: D3 (1994)
- Vivaldi: 12 concertos for violin il cimento dell'armonia e dell'inventione op.8 (Simon Standage, violin); flute concerto RV 429 (Stephen Preston, flute); cello concerto RV 424 (Anthony Pleeth, cello), CRD Records (1978)
- Vivaldi: le quattro stagioni (Simon Standage, violin) (1982)
- Vivaldi: 12 concertos for 1,2 and 4 violins l'estro armonico op.3 (Simon Standage, Micaela Comberti, Elizabeth Wilcock, Miles Golding, violins) (1987)
- Vivaldi: 12 concertos for violin la stravaganza op.4 (Simon Standage, violin) (1990)
- Vivaldi: 7 concerti for woodwind and strings (1995)
- Vivaldi: concerti "alla rustica" (1986)
- Vivaldi: concerti "l'amoroso" (1987)
- Vivaldi: 6 concerti for flute op.10 (Lisa Beznosiuk, flute) (1988)
- Vivaldi: Gloria; A. Scarlatti: Dixit Dominus (Nancy Argenta, soprano; Ingrid Attrot, soprano; Catherine Denley, contralto; Ashley Stafford, countertenor; Stephen Varcoe, bass) (1988)
- Vivaldi: Stabat Mater, Salve Regina, Nisi Dominus (Michael Chance, countertenor); concerto for strings RV 128; sinfonia for strings 'al Santo Sepolcro' RV 169 (1995)

==== Collections ====
- Christmas Concertos (1988)
- Pachelbel: Canon and Gigue (1985)
- A Grand Concert of Musick: English Baroque Concertos (1979)
- Christmas in Rome: Vivaldi: Gloria; Corelli: Christmas Concerto; A. Scarlatti: O di Betlemme altera povertà (Nancy Argenta, soprano; Jennifer Smith, soprano; Catherine Wyn Rogers, contralto) (on DVD and CD) (1992)
- Opera Arias by Mozart, Haydn and Gluck (Anne Sofie von Otter, mezzo-soprano) (1995)
- Oboe Concertos: C. P. E. Bach, Wq.165; Lebrun, no.1; Mozart, K.314 (Paul Goodwin, oboe) (1991)
- Sound the trumpet: Royal music of Purcell & Handel (Alison Balsom, natural trumpet; Iestyn Davies, countertenor; Lucy Crowe, soprano), EMI Classics (2012)

=== Conducting ===
- Exquisite Fires: Music of Linda Bouchard with Kevin McMillan (baritone) and the National Arts Centre Orchestra, Marquis Classics (1998)
- Renée Fleming: Sacred Songs in Concert from Mainz Cathedral with the Deutsche Kammerphilharmonie Bremen and the Mainzer Domchor, Decca Records (on DVD only) (2005)
- J. S. Bach: Six Concertos for the Margrave of Brandenburg with the European Brandenburg Ensemble, Avie Records (2007)
- Mahler: Symphony No. 4 (Chamber arrangement by Erwin Stein) with Sónia Grané (soprano) and the Royal Academy of Music Soloists Ensemble, Linn Records (2013)
- Bruckner: Symphony No. 2 (Chamber arrangement by Anthony Payne) with the Royal Academy of Music Soloists Ensemble, Linn Records (2014)
- Mahler: Lieder eines fahrenden Gesellen (arr. Schoenberg) (Chamber arrangement of Zemlinsky, Busoni and Wagner) with the Royal Academy of Music Soloists Ensemble, Linn Records (2015)
- Mozart: Gran Partita with the Royal Academy of Music Soloists Ensemble, Linn Records (2016)
- C. P. E. Bach: Flute Concertos with Emmanuel Pahud (flute) and the Kammerakademie Potsdam, Warner Classics (2016)
- J. S. Bach: Goldberg Variations (arranged for small orchestra by Józef Koffler) with the Royal Academy of Music Soloists Ensemble and guests from The Glenn Gould School, Linn Records (2020)
- J. S. Bach: Partitas (re-imagined for small orchestra by Thomas Oehler) with the Royal Academy of Music Soloists Ensemble and guests from The Glenn Gould School, Linn Records (2023)
- Baroque Concertos with Alison Balsom (piccolo trumpet) and the Pinnock's Players, Warner Classics (2024)

== Notes and references ==
Cultural offices
Preceded by no predecessor	Music Director, The English Concert; 1972–2003	Succeeded by Andrew Manze
