= Pleeth =

Pleeth is a surname. Notable people with the surname include:

- Anthony Pleeth (born 1948), British cellist
- William Pleeth (1916–1999), British cellist
