= Music by the Commons =

The logo of Music by the Commons

Music by the Commons is an Early music society which organises regular concerts in Wimbledon, South West London, England. It mainly features music written before 1830.

The music is performed on authentic musical instruments.

== Representatives ==
The Patron of the society is the Bishop of Southwark. Simon Standage, conductor and violinist, is the president. He regularly plays at concerts organised by the society.

The Society's musical advisors are Catherine Mackintosh, also a violinist, and Robert Woolley, harpsichordist and organist.

== History ==
The Society was founded by Tony Penny, who ran the Society with John Waller, a Wimbledon resident, for over two decades. It was officially launched in September 1986. The occasion was a concert by Trevor Pinnock, the harpsichordist and conductor. Many other distinguished musicians have played at Music by the Commons concerts, including:

- Catherine Mackintosh,
- Robert Woolley, and
- Monica Huggett.

The Society also provides an opportunity for young musicians to perform in public and in so doing encourages interest and research into early music. The society encourages young people and children at local schools to attend the concerts. Children still at school may attend the concerts free.

== Organisation ==
The society is operated by the following:

- John Waller
- Tom Emlyn Williams a solo tenor
- Peter Ledgerwood

== Origin of name of the Society ==
The name Music by the Commons was chosen because there are 16 commons in Southwest London. Wimbledon Common is the largest. Pest House Common in Richmond, Surrey, is the smallest. The windmill symbol chosen by the society represents the windmill on Wimbledon Common.

== See also ==
- Early Music Network
- Early music revival
- Historically informed performance
- List of early music ensembles
- Neo-medieval music
