= Andrew Manze =

British conductor and violinist

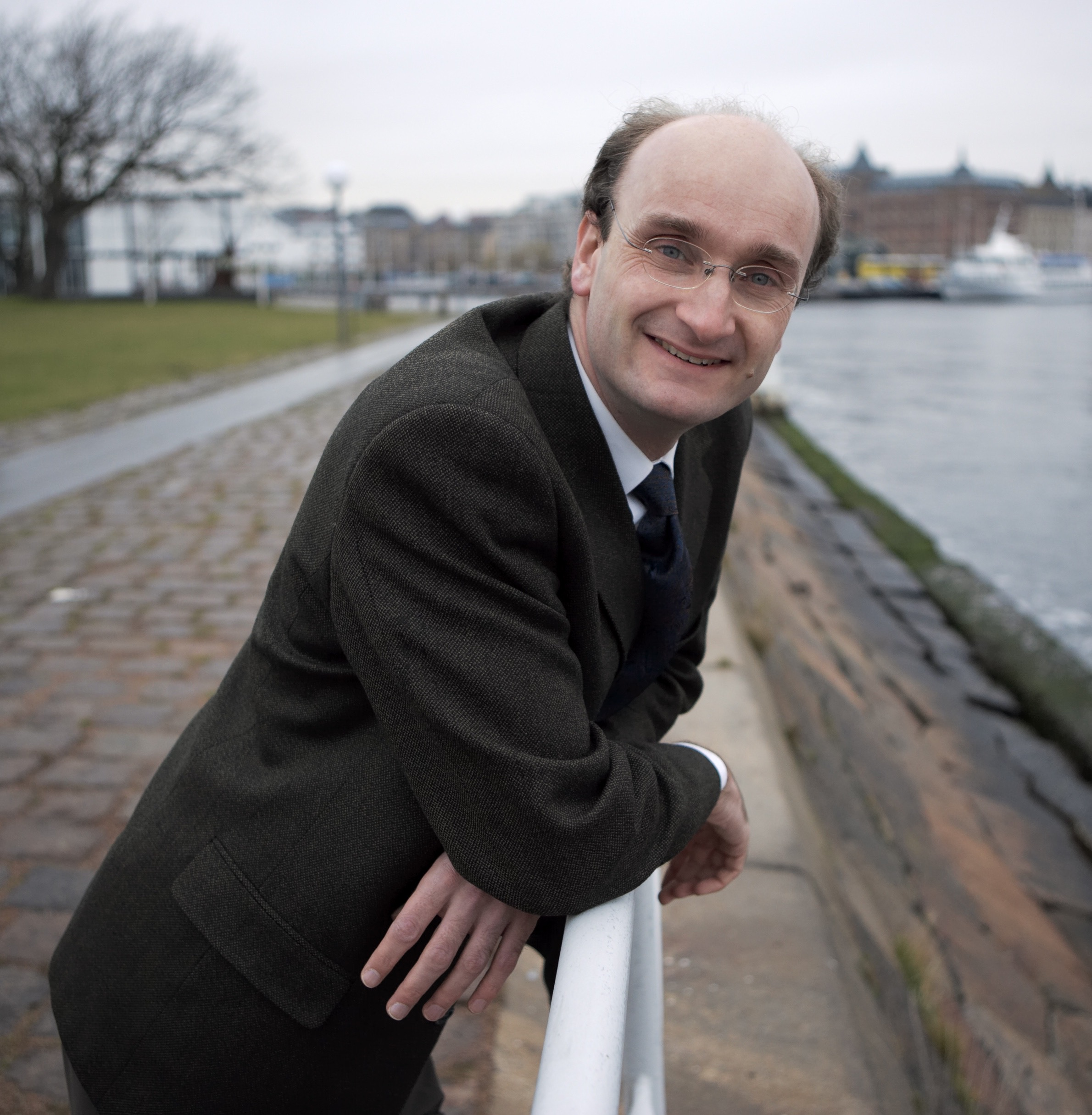
Andrew Manze in 2005

Andrew Manze (born 14 January 1965) is a British conductor and violinist, noted for his interpretation of Baroque violin music.

== Biography ==
Born in Beckenham in Kent, England, Manze read Classics at Clare College, Cambridge. He studied violin and worked with Ton Koopman, his director in the Amsterdam Baroque Orchestra, and with Simon Standage, his teacher in the Royal Academy of Music. He began his musical career as a specialist in Early Music, and has recorded as a soloist for such labels as Harmonia Mundi. He became associate director of the Academy of Ancient Music in 1996.

From 2003 to 2007, Manze was artistic director of The English Concert, with whom he recorded commercially for Harmonia Mundi. He has also conducted recordings on labels such as Onyx and Pentatone. Manze was associate guest conductor of the BBC Scottish Symphony Orchestra (BBC SSO) from September 2010 to August 2014, and recorded with the BBC SSO for Hyperion.

Outside the UK, from 2006 to 2014, Manze was principal conductor and artistic director of the Helsingborg Symphony Orchestra. He made a number of recordings with them, including Beethoven's Symphony No 3 (Harmonia Mundi), Stenhammar Piano Concerti (Hyperion), and a cycle of the Brahms symphonies (CPO). In September 2014, he became principal conductor of the NDR Radiophilharmonie. In March 2017, the orchestra announced the extension of Manze's contract through to 2021. In February 2019, the orchestra announced a further extension of Manze's contract to 2023. Manze stood down as chief conductor of the NDR Radiophilharmonie at the close of the 2022-2023 season.

In September 2016, Manze stepped in to replace Sir John Eliot Gardiner, conducting the Gewandhaus Orchestra in the opening concerts of Leipzig's Mendelssohn-Festtage. The Monteverdi Choir and soloists, including Lucy Crowe, Jurgita Adamonytė and Michael Spyres, sang Psalm 42 "Wie der Hirsch schreit" and the Symphony-Cantata "Lobgesang".

In April 2024, the Scottish Chamber Orchestra (SCO) announced the appointment of Manze as its next principal guest conductor, effective with the 2024-2025 season, with an initial contract of three years. Manze had first worked with the SCO in 2006.

Manze has been a fellow of the Royal Academy of Music and a visiting professor at the Oslo Academy. He has contributed to new editions of sonatas and concertos by Mozart and Bach published by Bärenreiter and Breitkopf and Härtel. He also teaches, edits and writes about music, as well as broadcasting regularly on radio and television. In 2011 Manze received the Rolf Schock Prize.

== Selected recordings ==
- J. S. Bach: solo and double Violin Concertos. Andrew Manze, Rachel Podger, violins; The Academy of Ancient Music, directed by Andrew Manze. Harmonia Mundi HMU 907155 (1997).
- Vivaldi: Violin Concertos op.6. Andrew Manze, violin; The Academy of Ancient Music, directed by Christopher Hogwood. Decca CD 455 653-2 (2000).
- Vaughan Williams: Symphonies Nos 2 & 8. Royal Liverpool Philharmonic Orchestra, Onyx 4155 (2016).
- Felix Mendelssohn: Symphonies Nos. 1 & 3. NDR Radiophilharmonie. PENTATONE PTC 5186595 (2017).
- W. A. Mozart: Piano Concerti Nos. 25 & 26. Francesco Piemontesi (piano); Scottish Chamber Orchestra. Linn Records (2017).
- Elgar, Tchaikovsky: Johannes Moser, Orchestre de la Suisse Romande. PENTATONE PTC 5186570 (2017).
- Vaughan Williams: Symphonies Nos 3 & 4, Royal Liverpool Philharmonic Orchestra, ONYX 4161 (2017)
- Vaughan Williams Symphonies No 5 & 6, Royal Liverpool Philharmonic, Onyx 4184 (2018)
- Felix Mendelssohn: Symphonies Nos 4 & 5. NDR Radiophilharmonie. PENTATON PTC 5186611 (2018).
- Felix Mendelssohn: Symphony No 2. Anna Lucia Richter, Esther Dierkes, Robin Tritschler, NDR Radiophilharmonie, WDR Rundfunkchor Köln, NDR Chor. PENTATONE PTC 5186639 (2018).
- W. A. Mozart: Mozart Symphonies 40 & 41. NDR Radiophilharmonie. PENTATONE. PTC 5186 757 (2019).
- FLOW. Annelien Van Wauwe, NDR Radiophilharmonie, Andrew Manze. Pentatone (2022)

Cultural offices
Preceded by Trevor Pinnock	Music Director, The English Concert; 2003–2007	Succeeded by Harry Bicket
Preceded by Hannu Lintu	Chief Conductor, Helsingborg Symphony Orchestra; 2006–2014	Succeeded by Stefan Solyom
Preceded by Eivind Gullberg Jensen	Chief Conductor, NDR Radiophilharmonie; 2014–2023	Succeeded by Stanislav Kochanovsky
