= Salomon Quartet =

The Salomon Quartet was formed in 1982 as one of the first string quartets playing music of the classical period on authentic instruments and informed by historical scholarship. The quartet originally comprised Simon Standage (violin), Micaela Comberti †, (violin), Trevor Jones †, (viola), and Jennifer Ward Clarke †, (cello). Violin II is now taken by Catherine Martin, viola by Adam Romer and cello by Andrew Skidmore.

The violins and viola are modern reproductions of models set up as they would have been at the end of the 18th century. The cello is English and dates from 1791.

== Recordings ==
- Mozart: The 6 'Haydn' String Quartets, K.387, 421, 428, 458, 464, 465 (including 'Dissonance', 'Hunt' and 'Drum')
- Mozart: String quartets K.565 and K.590
- Mozart: String quartets K.499 'Hoffmeister' and K.589
- Mozart: String quintets K.515, 593, 516, 614 with Simon Whistler, viola
- Mozart: Piano quartets K.478, 493 with Richard Burnett, fortepiano
- Mozart: Clarinet quintets K.581, 516c, 580b (completed by Duncan Druce) with Alan Hacker, basset horn and Lesley Schatzberger, clarinet
- Mozart: Eine Kleine Nachtmusik with The Academy of Ancient Music and Christopher Hogwood
- Gyrowetz: 3 string quartets op.44
- The String Quartet in 18th-century England: string quartets by Abel, Shield, Marsh, Webbe and Wesley.
- Haydn: the 'Sun' quartets op.20 nos.1-6
- Haydn: the 'Russian' quartets op.33 nos.1-6, op.42 (including 'The Joke', 'The Bird' and 'How do you do?')
- Haydn: 'Prussian' quartets op.50 nos.1-6
- Haydn: 'Tost I' quartets op.54
- Haydn: 'Tost II' quartets op.55
- Haydn: 'Tost' quartets op.64 nos.1-6 (including 'The Lark')
- Haydn: String quartets op.71 nos.1-3
- Haydn: String quartets op.74 nos.1-3 (including 'The Rider')
- Haydn: String quartets op.77 nos.1-2, op.103
- Haydn: Symphonies no.100 and 104 (in the transcriptions of Salomon) with Lisa Beznosiuk, flute, and Christopher Hogwood, fortepiano
