= Lisa Beznosiuk =

English flautist

Lisa Beznosiuk (born 20 August 1956 in Sheffield) is an English flautist of Ukrainian and Irish descent, specializing in period performance of baroque and classical music on historical flutes.

== Biography and career ==
Lisa Beznosiuk trained at the Guildhall School of Music in London, England. She studied modern flute with Kathryn Lukas and wooden flute with Stephen Preston, which developed her interest in early period instruments. She made her solo London debut in 1983. She has been a member of period-instrument orchestras The English Concert, the Orchestra of the Age of Enlightenment, the English Baroque Soloists, The Academy of Ancient Music, the London Classical Players and New London Consort. In her roles as soloist and orchestral principal, she has travelled throughout Europe, the Far East, and North and South America.

She is professor of early flutes at the Guildhall School of Music & Drama, Royal Academy of Music, Royal College of Music, Royal Northern College of Music and University of Birmingham.

Her recordings include Handel's and Bach's complete flute sonatas (with harpsichordist Paul Nicholson), Vivaldi's op.10 flute concertos, Bach's 'triple concerto' (BWV 1044), Brandenburg Concerto no.5 (BWV 1050) and orchestral suite no.2 (BWV 1067), all with The English Concert, Mozart's flute concertos and concerto for flute and harp with The Academy of Ancient Music, amongst others.

Violinist Pavlo Beznosiuk is her brother, and she is married to cellist Richard Tunnicliffe.
