= Jennifer Ward Clarke =

British cellist (1935–2015)

Jennifer Ward Clarke (20 June 1935 – 1 March 2015) was a British cellist. After an early career in contemporary music, she later specialised in baroque music and performances on period instruments.

== Early life and career ==
Jennifer Ward Clarke was born in Yateley, Hampshire on 20 June 1935, the daughter of Dorothea (née Devitt) and Harry Ward Clarke, a prep school headteacher. At Benenden School in Kent she became interested in the cello, and studied at London's Royal College of Music with Ivor James, where she won the prize for cello. She won a scholarship to study for a year at the Paris Conservatoire with Paul Tortelier. On three occasions she took part in the masterclasses in Switzerland of Pablo Casals.

In London she played for a period in the Philharmonia Orchestra under Otto Klemperer, and in the English Chamber Orchestra.

She was a founder member in 1965 of the Pierrot Players, later renamed the Fires of London, and with them took part in the first performances of Eight Songs for a Mad King by Peter Maxwell Davies, and Medusa by Harrison Birtwistle. She was a founder member of the London Sinfonietta in 1968, and played with them for several years.

== Baroque music ==
In 1968 Jennifer Ward Clarke played with Paul Steinitz in the Steinitz Bach Players, and became interested in continuo playing in baroque music.

She later played with the Monteverdi Orchestra, the London Classical Players, the Taverner Players and the Orchestra of the Age of Enlightenment.

She was a member of the Music Party, a chamber group playing 18th century music, set up in 1972 by the clarinettist Alan Hacker, and the Academy of Ancient Music, founded in 1973.

In 1982 she became a member of the Salomon Quartet, set up to perform classical music on period instruments; she toured and made recordings with the quartet until her retirement in 2009. From the 1980s she was professor of baroque cello at the Royal Academy of Music.

She was married to the writer Michael Foss, and they had a daughter Kate.
