= Paul Goodwin (conductor) =

English conductor and oboist (born 1956)

- Born: September 2, 1956 (age 70); Warwick, England
- Occupations: conductor, oboist
- Instrument: Oboe

Paul Goodwin (born 2 September 1956) is an English conductor and former oboist.

== Oboist ==
Goodwin was born in Warwick, England. He studied oboe with Janet Craxton. Following his graduation from the University of Nottingham, he specialized in contemporary oboe techniques and the baroque oboe at the Guildhall School of Music and Drama in London. He later continued his studies in Vienna with Jurg Schäftlein.

Goodwin played historical oboes. He was the principal oboist of the English Concert and the London Classical Players and has recorded more than 20 solo and concerto records.

== Conductor ==
In 1996, Goodwin transitioned from playing the oboe to conducting. He subsequently studied conducting in Helsinki with Jorma Panula. He held positions with The Academy of Ancient Music as an associate conductor, and the English Chamber Orchestra as the principal guest conductor.

He was the Artistic Director and Principal Conductor of the Carmel Bach Festival in California (2010–2021), Principal Guest Conductor of Capella Aquileia in Germany and is presently Director of the Historical Performance Programme at the Escuela Superior de Musica Reina Sofia in Madrid.

For 11 years, Goodwin was the Associate Conductor of the Academy of Ancient Music, touring and making recordings of Heinrich Schütz, Mozart's singspiel Zaide and music by Sir John Tavener that Goodwin commissioned for the AAM. Three of these CDs have been nominated for Grammy (US) and Gramophone Awards (UK). Subsequent AAM commissions included pieces by David Bedford, John Woolrich and Thea Musgrave.

Goodwin was one of the principal guest conductors with the Kammerorchester Basel, where he performed a wide range of repertoire from J. S. Bach to Mark Anthony Turnage, on both modern and period instruments. Goodwin was the Principal Guest Conductor of the English Chamber Orchestra for six years, collaborating with artists such as Kiri Te Kanawa, Joshua Bell, Maria João Pires, Mstislav Rostropovich and Magdalena Kožená. Goodwin has also recorded CDs of Amy Beach and Elgar's Nursery Suite for Harmonia Mundi, France.

Goodwin conducts orchestras through the world including the BBC Philharmonic, the Hallé and the BBC National Orchestra of Wales and Scottish Chamber Orchestra in the UK; the SanFrancisco Symphony, Philadelphia, Baltimore and Minnesota orchestras in the USA; the Leipzig Gewandhaus, the radio orchestras in Munich, Saarbrücken, Hannover, Leipzig, the Beethoven Orchestra Bonn and the Bodenseephilharmonic in Germany; the National Orchestras of Spain, Poland, Belgium, Sweden, Rumania, Korea, Taiwan and Mexico.

In opera Goodwin has conducted productions at the Sydney Opera House, the Teatro Real Madrid, Royal Danish Opera, Welsh National Opera, Scottish National Opera, Komische Opera in Berlin, Opera Bonn and Warsaw Chamber Opera.

Goodwin has worked on educational projects with the National Youth Orchestras in the Netherlands, Spain, Italy, Germany and the USA and with the orchestras of the Royal College of Music and Royal Academy of Music, Akademie Vokal Mainz in Germany and Poland. Goodwin was conductor of the Queen Elisabeth Competition Brussels for nine years. He has recorded Prokofiev's Peter and the Wolf and Chappell's Paddington Bear with the Munich Radio Symphony Orchestra.

Goodwin was awarded the Handel Prize of the City of Halle (Saale) in 2007 in recognition of his services to performances of works by George Frideric Handel and was awarded the official Plaque of the Reina Sofia School of Music by Her Majesty Queen Sofia of Spain.

== Discography ==
As a conductor, Goodwin has recorded CDs of Handel's operas Lotario and Riccardo Primo, and his oratorio Athalia, as well as discs of Schutz, Britten, Elgar, John Tavener, Richard Strauss, Mozart, J. S. Bach, Kozeluch and Amadeus Hartmann.

As an oboist, Goodwin has recorded CD’s of Handel, JS Bach, CPE Bach, Vivaldi, Telemann, Albinoni, Mozart, Haydn and Lebrun.
