= Micaela Comberti =

British violinist (1952–2003)

Micaela "Mica" Comberti (28 September 1952 – 4 March 2003) was an English violinist. Her concert career lasted from 1977 until her death. Born to a German mother and an Italian father, she was taught at the University of Music and Performing Arts Vienna, the Royal Academy of Music and the Mozarteum University Salzburg. Comberti was involved in early music and played for The English Concert, St. James' Baroque, Ex Cathedra and the Collegium Musicum 90. She also taught at the Guildhall School of Music and Drama, the Royal College of Music and the Royal Academy of Music. An award and position at the Royal Academy of Music are named after the violinist.

== Biography ==
Comberti was born to a German mother and an Italian father in London on 28 September 1952. She was known by the name Mica from an early age. Comberti demonstrated a talent for music from an early age; aged 19 she travelled to Vienna to study with the violinist Eduard Melkus at the University of Music and Performing Arts Vienna with her experiences directing her to historical performances. In 1970 Comberti performed with the jazz band Centipede run by the pianist Keith Tippett.

She returned to the United Kingdom in 1972. Comberti spent the following three years under the tutelage of Manoug Parikian at the Royal Academy of Music, London. She subsequently went back to Vienna for two years and underwent further education at the Mozarteum University Salzburg as a pupil of Sándor Végh, whom had a profound influence on her life. Comberti had her interest in historical performance strengthened by attending the classes of Nikolaus Harnoncourt. She returned to the United Kingdom for a second time in 1977 to become involved in early music. Comberti played for a number of ensembles, record the scores of Wolfgang Amadeus Mozart and Joseph Haydn with the Salomon Quartet from 1982 on and was principal player of The English Concert until 1990.

Comberti left The English Concert in 1990 and began to lead orchestras for the St. James' Baroque, and Ex Cathedra from 1987, and was a guest of other established groups. She played as a soloist with the Collegium Musicum 90 and recorded the Concerto for Two Violins for them. Comberti recorded the sonatas of Johann Sebastian Bach with the harpsichordist and long-time musical partner Colin Tilney. She taught at the Guildhall School of Music and Drama and then at the Royal College of Music and the Royal Academy of Music. Comberti was also associated with the Dartington Summer School and Festival.

From 1999 on she trained the Bavarian State Opera in period style for several of its productions of Claudio Monteverdi and George Frideric Handel and enhanced the reputation of the opera for its performances of the latter composer within Germany. Comberti undertook a similar venture with the Hamburg State Opera in 2002. Her final public performance was with the violinist Simon Standage in February 2003.

== Personal life ==
She was married to the violinist Gustav Clarkson, and had three children with him (two sons and a daughter). Comberti became ill while holidaying in August 2002 and was diagnosed with cancer. She followed a strict diet to lessen the effects of cancer and continued to teach through her illness. She died on 4 March 2003.

== Legacy ==
Standage in his obituary of Comberti in The Guardian said Comberti was "at the forefront of an influential generation of British early musicians. As a zestful performer with an inquiring spirit and, more recently, as a thoughtful and dedicated teacher, she earned the affection and respect of colleagues and pupils alike." A performance of Bach's St John Passion by Ex Cathedra at Lichfield Cathedral on 3 April 2003 was dedicated to her memory.

The Micaela Comberti Chair for Baroque Violin at the Royal Academy of Music was established in September 2008 and is currently led by one of Comberti's pupils, Rachel Podger. The conservatoire also awards the Mica Comberti Prize on a yearly basis "for the performance of any complete work by JS Bach for violin, viola or viola da gamba."
