= Harry Bicket =

British conductor, harpsichordist and organist

Harry Bicket OBE
- Born: 1961 (age 64–65)
- Occupations: Conductor; Harpsichordist; Organist
- Organizations: Santa Fe Opera; The English Concert
- Spouse: Audrey de Nazelle

Harry Alexander Clarence Bicket OBE (born 1961) is a British conductor, harpsichordist and organist. He is particularly associated with the baroque and classical repertoire.

== Biography ==
Bicket was educated at Radley College, Christ Church, Oxford, where he was an organ scholar, and the Royal College of Music. Before Oxford, he was an organ scholar at St George's Chapel, Windsor. Afterwards, he was sub-organist at Westminster Abbey, during which time he performed at the wedding of Sarah Ferguson and Prince Andrew. He first performed on the harpsichord in 1983 at The Proms as an emergency deputy, his first-ever public performance on harpsichord.

As a conductor, Bicket became known when he stood in as a replacement to conduct Peter Sellars' production of Handel's opera Theodora with Dawn Upshaw, Lorraine Hunt Lieberson and David Daniels, at the Glyndebourne Festival in 1996. In 2003, Bicket made his Covent Garden debut conducting Handel's Orlando with the Orchestra of the Age of Enlightenment (OAE). In 2004, Bicket made his first appearance at the Metropolitan Opera in a production of Rodelinda with Renée Fleming in the title role. He returned to Handel and the Met in 2020, conducting a production new to that house of Agrippina.

In October 2006, Bicket was named music director of The English Concert, and formally assumed the post in September 2007, his first orchestral directorship. He first worked with The English Concert as a harpsichordist in 1984. Bicket has conducted commercial recordings with The English Concert for Harmonia Mundi.

Bicket first conducted at Santa Fe Opera (SFO) in 2004, in a production of Agrippina. He returned to SFO as conductor for subsequent productions of Platée (2007) and Radamisto (2008). In April 2013, SFO named Bicket its next chief conductor, effective 1 October 2013. Although the formal press release did not indicate a specific time length of Bicket's initial contract, SFO general director Charles MacKay stated an informal duration of 4–5 years. In November 2016, Santa Fe Opera announced the extension of Bicket's contract as chief conductor through 30 September 2020. In February 2018, Santa Fe Opera announced the elevation of Bicket's title from chief conductor to music director of the company, effective 1 October 2018. In October 2018, Santa Fe Opera announced the extension of Bicket's contract with the company, as music director, through the 2023 season. In May 2026, the company announced the most recent extension of Bicket's contract as music director through the 2028 season.

In addition to recording with The English Concert, Bicket has conducted commercial recordings with other ensembles for various labels, including Decca, Avie, and EMI.

Bicket is married to the environmental scholar Audrey de Nazelle, of Imperial College London. The family resides in London. He was appointed Officer of the Order of the British Empire (OBE) in the 2022 Birthday Honours for services to music.

Cultural offices
Preceded by Andrew Manze	Music Director, The English Concert; 2007–present	Succeeded by incumbent
Preceded by Frédéric Chaslin	Chief Conductor, Santa Fe Opera; 2013–2018	Succeeded by incumbent (as music director)
Preceded by incumbent (as chief conductor)	Music Director, Santa Fe Opera; 2018–present	Succeeded by incumbent
