= Collegium Musicum 90 =

English baroque orchestra

Collegium Musicum 90 is an English baroque orchestra playing on period instruments. It was founded by violinist Simon Standage and conductor Richard Hickox in 1990 and was jointly directed by them (either together or separately) until the death of Hickox in November 2008.

Collegium Musicum means something like musical guild and was used generically as the name of musical societies and ensembles in the baroque era, and is sometimes used similarly today by ensembles playing early music.

Simon Standage was leader of baroque orchestra The English Concert under Trevor Pinnock from 1973 to 1991, often performing as violin soloist, while Richard Hickox had an initial background as a Cambridge University organ scholar and then became a conductor. Hickox founded the City of London Sinfonia and the Richard Hickox Singers in 1971 for the performance of Baroque music on modern instruments, for which Standage was concertmaster, then went on to pursue a career as a choral conductor of the London Symphony Chorus, as well as conducting large symphony orchestras and opera.

Collegium Musicum 90 was founded to be a standing period instrument orchestra specialising in baroque and early classical music which would enable Standage to direct regularly for the first time and Hickox to return emphatically to the baroque repertoire.

The orchestra has recorded extensively for Chandos Records; Standage has directed violin concertos and concerti grossi with himself as soloist, and Hickox has directed large-scale vocal repertoire with the group. They have toured around Europe and the United Kingdom, and performed at the Proms and other music festivals.
