= Pièces de clavecin en concerts =

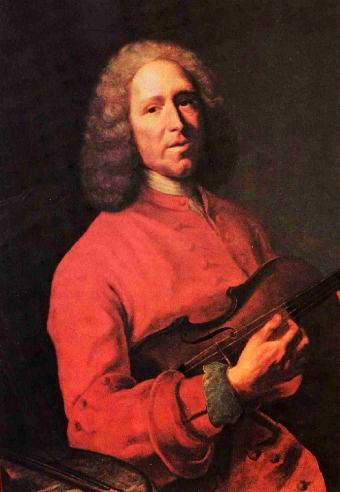
Jean-Philippe Rameau, by Jacques Aved, 1728

The Pièces de clavecin en concerts, published in 1741, constitute the only chamber music by Jean-Philippe Rameau. They were composed in full maturity, after his sets of music for solo harpsichord.

== Background ==
They differ from trio sonatas in the Italian manner, such as those of Corelli in which the harpsichord provides merely a figured bass; the keyboard instrument serves instead at the heart of the musical texture, playing a fully written out obbligato role while the "accompaniment," such as it is, falls to the violin and viola da gamba.

Rameau provided for differing instrumental combinations: the flute can replace the violin and a second violin can replace the viola da gamba. It is possible to compare these works with the violin sonatas of Johann Sebastian Bach, written earlier, around 1720, in which the melodic material is shared equally between the violin and harpsichord and the harpsichord part is obbligato nearly throughout.

They are divided into five concerts of three to four movements with typical French 'character' names, some of which can be enigmatic: a name of a place (Le Vézinet), of character (La timide, L'agaçante) or of persons (La Forqueray, La Marais, La Rameau). The last type of appellation was not used by Jean-Philippe Rameau for his solo harpsichord works.

== Pieces ==
=== Premier concert ===
First Concert in C minor, RCT 7: (Note: RCT numbering refers to Rameau Catalogue Thématique established by Sylvie Bouissou and Denis Herlin.)

1. La Coulicam
2. La Livri: Rondeau Gracieux
3. Le Vézinet

c. 10 mins (Note: Lengths are drawn from the Channel recording.)

=== Deuxième concert ===
Second Concert in G major, RCT 8:

1. La Laborde
2. La Boucon: Air Gracieux
3. L'agaçante
4. Premier menuet, Deuxième menuet

c. 19 minutes

=== Troisième concert ===
Third Concert in A major, RCT 9:

1. La Lapoplinière
2. La timide: 1er Rondeau, 2e Rondeau
3. Premier tambourin, Deuxième tambourin en Rondeau

c. 13 minutes

=== Quatrième concert ===
Fourth Concert in B♭ major, RCT 10:

1. La pantomime
2. L'indiscrète: Rondeau
3. La Rameau

c. 11 minutes

=== Cinquième concert ===
Fifth Concert in D minor, RCT 11:

1. La Forqueray: Fugue
2. La Cupis
3. La Marais

c. 13 minutes

== Recordings ==
- Channel Records, Trevor Pinnock (harpsichord), Rachel Podger (violin), Jonathan Manson (cello)
- Sony Classical SK 45868, John Steele Ritter (harpsichord), Isaac Stern (violin), Jean-Pierre Rampal (flute)
