= David Reichenberg =

American oboist (1950–1987)

David Reichenberg (13 July 1950 – 10 June 1987) was an American oboist and a highly respected specialist on the baroque oboe. He was born in Cedar Falls, Iowa and learnt the flute, violin, and piano as a child. He began his oboe studies with Dr. Myron E. Russell of the University of Northern Iowa. Beginning in 1969, Reichenberg studied at the Indiana University School of Music, continuing his oboe studies with Jerry Sirucek, former oboist with the Chicago Symphony Orchestra. Graduating in 1972, Reichenberg moved to Salzburg, where he attended the Mozarteum. It was in Salzburg that Reichenberg met Nikolaus Harnoncourt, director of Concentus Musicus Wien. Reichenberg became increasingly interested in playing the oboe's repertoire on the instrument for which it had been written and, with the assistance of Harnoncourt, moved to Vienna in order to study baroque oboe with Jürg Schäftlein. He simultaneously studied oboe making with Paul Hailperin, building the instrument upon which he played for four years. Reichenberg took part in many concerts and recordings with Concentus Musicus, and gradually increased his activities with that group.

In 1977, Reichenberg formed the Munich-based orchestra, Florilegium Musicum, which gave numerous performances of Bach cantatas and Mozart masses. During that year, Reichenberg received several requests to play in England. Most notable among these was the offer to participate in the Deutsche Grammophon/Archiv recordings of the Bach Orchestral Suites with the English Concert, directed by Trevor Pinnock. At the close of the year, Reichenberg toured the United States with the Concentus Musicus and thereafter moved to England.

In London, Reichenberg was immediately in demand as a freelance player with all the orchestras playing on period instruments. These included the Taverner Consort, the London Classical Players, London Baroque, the English Bach Festival, the Academy of Ancient Music, the English Baroque Soloists, as well as the English Concert. Reichenberg appeared extensively as soloist with the English Concert, and toured the United States, Japan, Germany, Austria, France and Italy with this group. His many recordings with the English Concert (Deutsche Grammophon/Archiv) include Bach's oboe d'amore concerto, as well as the double concerto for oboe and violin, all the Brandenburg concerti, the Handel oboe concerti, the Handel Concerti grossi Opus 3, Vivaldi's Oboe concerto in A minor, plus the G major double concerto for oboe and bassoon. Among his other solo recordings, Reichenberg recorded the Handel oboe sonatas with l'Ecole d'Orphee, available on the CRD label.

Following Reichenberg's arrival in London in 1978, he served as instructor of baroque oboe at the Guildhall School of Music and Drama where Marianne Richert Pfau was his first student in 1980. He also taught each summer from 1981 through 1986 at the Summer Academy held in Palicio de Mateus in northern Portugal. Reichenberg was appointed Professor of Baroque Oboe at the Vienna Hochschule in 1986.

He died of complications from AIDS in 1987. A memorial concert was held in London the following January to launch the David Reichenberg Trust, intended to fund research into AIDS care as well as a scholarship for baroque oboe.
