= Simon Standage =

English violinist and conductor

Simon Andrew Thomas Standage (born 8 November 1941 in High Wycombe, Buckinghamshire) is an English violinist and conductor best known for playing and conducting music of the baroque and classical eras on original instruments.

== Biography and career ==
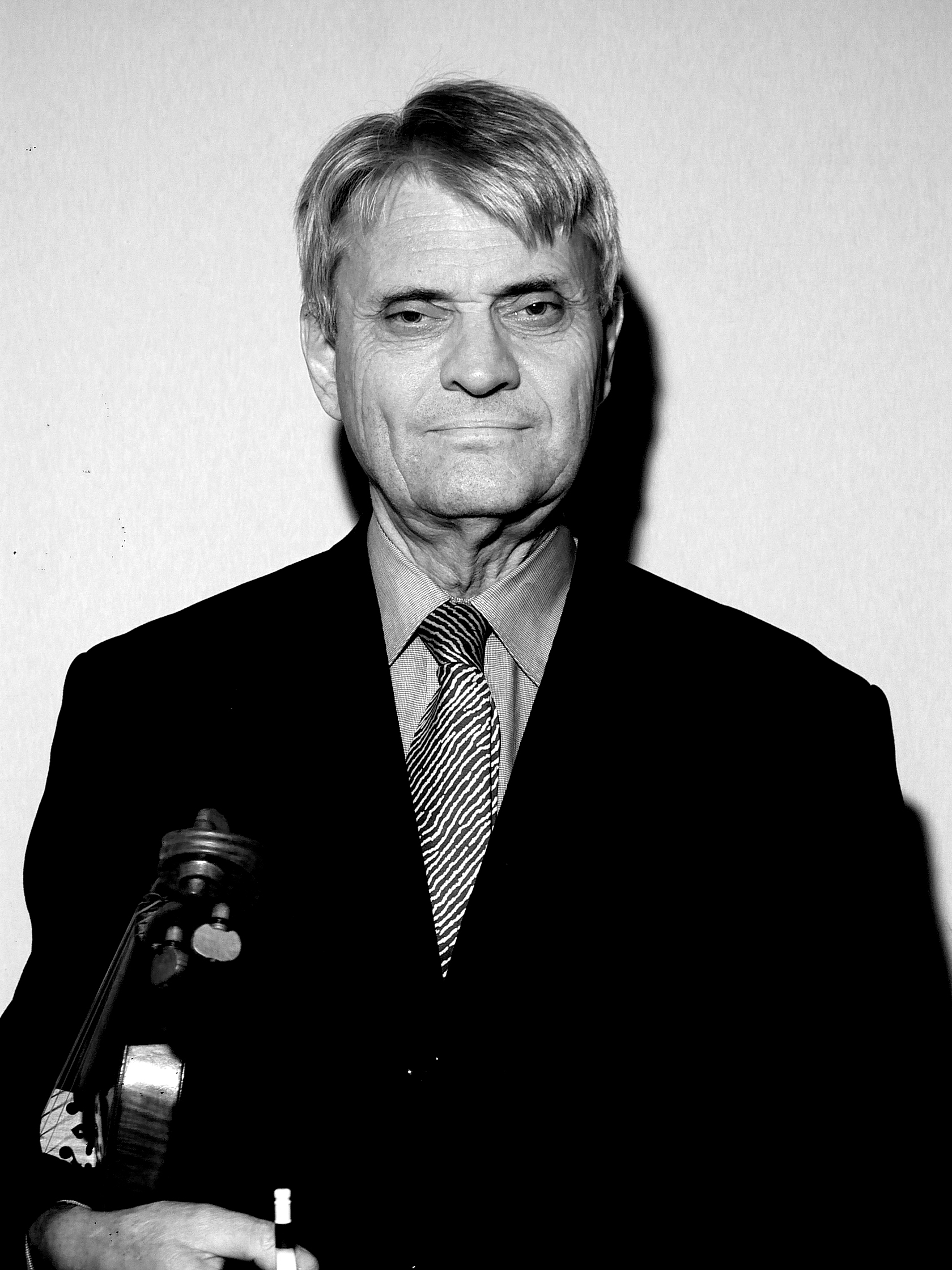
Simon Standage

He studied music at King's College, Cambridge, following which he spent four years in the Netherlands Chamber Orchestra under Szymon Goldberg. He won a Harkness Fellowship to study with Ivan Galamian in New York City from 1967 to 1969.

After a 1972 Wigmore Hall debut, he became a founding member of Trevor Pinnock's period-instrument ensemble The English Concert. He was first violinist of The English Concert from 1972 to 1991. In this time, he performed and recorded violin concertos by Bach (the single and double concertos, and the Brandenburg Concertos), Vivaldi (The complete op.3 l'estro armonico, op.4 la stravaganza and op.8 il cimento dell'armonia e dell'inventione, and Le quattro stagioni a celebrated second time), Haydn and others. He was also the first concertino violin in the concerti grossi of Corelli, Handel and others. During this time, he was sub-leader of the English Chamber Orchestra from 1974 to 1978 and led the City of London Sinfonia (the successor of the Richard Hickox Orchestra) from 1980 to 1989.

In 1981 he was a founder of the Salomon Quartet (with Micaela Comberti, violin II, Trevor Jones, viola, and Jennifer Ward Clarke, cello), a period-performance string quartet specialising in the classical repertory, performing and recording works by Mozart, Haydn, and lesser known composers.

He played regularly with The Academy of Ancient Music throughout the 1980s, often as first violin, and recorded Vivaldi's op.9 la cetra, and the complete violin concertos of Mozart. He later became associate director of the AAM from 1991 to 1995. In 1990, he and Richard Hickox founded the group Collegium Musicum 90, a period-performance group varying in size from two musicians to full orchestra and chorus with which he has made many recordings as both conductor and violin soloist, of works by Telemann, Vivaldi, Leclair, Marcello, Albinoni, Arne, Boyce, and others. He has also made regular collaboration with Collegium Musicum Telemann in Osaka and Haydn Sinfonietta in Vienna. He plays in period-instrument chamber group The Music Collection with Susan Alexander-Max (fortepiano) and Jennifer Ward Clarke (cello).

== Appointments ==
Standage has been a professor of baroque violin at the Royal Academy of Music since 1983, and taught baroque violin and conducting at the Akademie für Alte Musik Oberlausitz in Görlitz since 1993. He is also president of the Early music society, Music by the Commons, based in Wimbledon, South West London.
