= Rachel Podger =

British violinist and conductor (born 1968)

Rachel Podger FLSW
- Born: 30 May 1968 (age 58); England
- Genres: Classical
- Occupations: Musician, conductor
- Instrument: Violin
- Label: Channel Classics Records
- Website: rachelpodger.com

Rachel Podger FLSW (born 30 May 1968) is a British violinist and conductor specialising in the performance of Baroque music.

== Career ==
Podger was born in England to a British father and a mother from Hamburg, Germany. The family moved to Germany when she was still young and she was educated at a German Rudolf Steiner school. She then returned to the UK to study first with Perry Hart, then at the Guildhall School of Music and Drama with David Takeno, Pauline Scott, and Micaela Comberti. During her studies, she co-founded Baroque chamber groups The Palladian Ensemble and Florilegium, and worked with period instrument ensembles such as the New London Consort and London Baroque.

Podger often conducts Baroque orchestras from the violin. She was the leader of the Gabrieli Consort and Players and later of The English Concert from 1997 to 2002, touring extensively, often as soloist in Vivaldi's Le quattro stagioni and Grosso mogul concertos. In 2004 she took up guest directorship of the Orchestra of the Age of Enlightenment, opening with a tour in the United States with Bach's Brandenburg Concertos. She currently works as a guest director with Arte dei Suonatori (Poland), Musica Angelica and Santa Fe Pro Musica (both in the United States) and as soloist with The Academy of Ancient Music.

Podger is a professor of Baroque violin at both the Guildhall School of Music and Drama and the Royal Welsh College of Music and Drama and also teaches regularly at the Hochschule für Künste, Bremen. In September 2008, she took up the newly founded Micaela Comberti Chair for Baroque violin at the Royal Academy of Music in London and then became professor of Baroque violin at the Royal Danish Academy of Music in Copenhagen. In 2022, Podger was elected a Fellow of the Learned Society of Wales.

When not touring with various orchestras and other classical players, Podger works with her partner in Brecon, Mid-Wales, helping young musicians through the Mozart Music Fund, which she founded in 2006, as well as holding workshops and giving recitals. In 2006 they founded the annual Brecon Baroque Festival which is held over the penultimate weekend of October every year.

== Instruments ==
Podger plays a violin made in Genoa in 1739 by Pesarinius, a later student of Antonio Stradivari. She initially played a Stradivarius copy from 1988 by Rowland Ross, and has recorded Haydn and Mozart on the 1699 Crespi Stradivarius.

== Recordings ==
Podger records for Channel Classics Records and other labels.

- Bach's complete sonatas and partitas for violin solo, complete volumes 1 and 2 (top recommendation in BBC Radio 3 "Building a Library")
- Telemann's 12 fantasies for solo violin (1746)
- Bach's complete sonatas for violin and harpsichord, with Trevor Pinnock
- Purcell's sonatas in 3 parts, with Pavlo Beznosiuk and Christopher Hogwood
- Bach's solo and double violin concertos, with Andrew Manze and The Academy of Ancient Music (1997)
- Vivaldi's 12 La Stravaganza concertos, directing Arte dei Suonatori (won Gramophone magazine's Best Baroque Recording of 2003) available on CD, SACD and Studio Master
- Mozart's complete sonatas for violin and fortepiano, with Gary Cooper, volumes 1–8
- Rameau's Pieces de clavecin en concerts, with Trevor Pinnock and Jonathan Manson
- Mozart and Haydn violin concertos, with the Orchestra of the Age of Enlightenment and Pavlo Beznosiuk on viola (available on CD, SACD and Studio Master)
- Bach's solo violin concertos, with Brecon Baroque (2010)
- Biber's 16 Rosary Sonatas, with Jonathan Manson, David Miller, and Marcin Świątkiewicz (2015)
- Vivaldi's 12 L'estro Armonico (Opus 3) concertos, directing Brecon Baroque (won Gramophone magazine's recording of the month for April 2015)
- Bach's Die Kunst Der Fuge, with Brecon Baroque (2017)
- Vivaldi's Le quattro stagioni, complete with three other Vivaldi concerti: Il Riposo per Il S.S. Natale RV 270, Concerto L'Amoroso Rv 271, and Concerto Il Grosso Mogul Rv 208 (2018), which immediately received several high praise reviews. It reached #1 in the UK classical album chart.
- An album entitled Tutta Sola (2022), containing works for solo violin written before Bach's Sonatas and Partitas, such as Giuseppe Tartini, Johann Joseph Vilsmayr, and Johann Paul von Westhoff, along with a transcription of the Toccata and Fugue in D minor, BWV 565 for solo violin by Chad Kelly

== Sources ==
- BBC Radio 3, Profile: Rachel Podger , The Early Music Show, broadcast 27 April 2008. Accessed 8 May 2009.
- James Reel, "Master of the Universe: In early music, violinist Rachel Podger found a second calling", Strings magazine, February 2005, No. 126. Accessed 2012-03-12.
