= Jonathan Manson =

Jonathan Manson is a Scottish cellist and viol player. Born in Edinburgh, he studied cello with Jane Cowan and later went on to the Eastman School of Music in Rochester, NY, where he studied with Steven Doane and Christel Thielmann. He studied viola da gamba with Wieland Kuijken in The Hague.

While a student, he was a founding member of Phantasm, a consort of viols. In 1999 he was appointed principal cellist of Ton Koopman's Amsterdam Baroque Orchestra (of which his sister Catherine is principal violinist), with which he has performed and recorded more than 150 of Bach's cantatas. He has appeared as guest principal with many early music ensembles, such as the Academy of Ancient Music, The English Concert, the Gabrieli Consort & Players, English Baroque Soloists and Orchestra of the Age of Enlightenment.

He has recorded Rameau's Pieces de Clavecin en Concerts and Bach's viola da gamba sonatas with harpsichordist Trevor Pinnock and is the first cello in his European Brandenburg Ensemble, who have recorded and toured with Bach's Brandenburg concertos. He lives in London and has been a professor of cello at the Royal Academy of Music since 2003.
