= Dunedin Consort =

Edinburgh-based Baroque music ensemble

Dunedin Consort is a baroque music ensemble based in Edinburgh, Scotland.

== History ==
The group was founded in 1995 by Susan Hamilton and Ben Parry. In 2003, the group chose John Butt as its conductor. Butt shared the title of co-artistic director of the Dunedin Consort until August 2012, when his title was changed to music director.

The group was named after Din Eidyn, the ancient Brittonic Celtic name of Edinburgh Castle. They perform on period instruments, with choruses often numbering just one to a part. The ensemble was awarded Gramophone Awards – for the 2007 recording of Handel's Messiah and the 2014 recording of Mozart's Requiem – and a Grammy nomination. In 2018 it was shortlisted for a Royal Philharmonic Society Award in the Ensemble category.

At BBC Proms debut in 2017 the group gave a performance of Bach's John Passion. In the same year, Dunedin Consort announced its first residency at London's Wigmore Hall, along with its regular series of events in Edinburgh, Glasgow and Perth, Scotland. In Scotland, Dunedin Consort has appeared at the Edinburgh International, Lammermuir and East Neuk Festivals. Its discography on Linn Records includes Handel's Acis and Galatea and Bach's Brandenburg Concertos, both nominated for Gramophone Awards. Other Bach recordings include Mass in B minor, Violin Concertos, Magnificat, Christmas Oratorio, Matthew Passion and John Passion, which was nominated for a Recording of the Year award in both Gramophone and BBC Music Magazine. In its Handel series, Dunedin Consort has recorded Messiah in its original Dublin version, Esther (Handel's first oratorio in English), the Ode for St Cecilia’s Day, and Samson in its first version of 1743. In 2017 Dunedin Consort released its recording of Monteverdi's Vespro della Beata Vergine 1610.

The ensemble has also commissioned and premiered new works by composers including Sally Beamish, Harvey Brough, Corrina Hewat, Peter Nelson, William Sweeney, and Errollyn Wallen.

== Recordings and awards ==
The consort has made 15 recordings on Linn Records. Other labels have included Delphian for …in Chains of Gold and The People’s Mass, Tob Records for Silhouettes and Crimson Productions for A Celtic Christmas.

- 1997: A Celtic Christmas: with William Jackson and the Scottish Orchestra of Music. Màiri MacInnes and Mae McKenna also contributed tracks
- 2000: In the Beginning: music of Samuel Barber and Aaron Copland; the Consort is directed by Ben Parry
- 2000: The Dunedin Consort Live: self-published; out of print
- 2003: … in Chains of Gold: music of Thomas Tallis and William Byrd (without conductor)
- 2003: The People’s Mass: a composite of texts from the Order of Mass and from English language poetry set to music by Malcolm Lindsey, Christine McCombe, Tommy Fowler, John Gormley, Anthea Haddow and Rebecca Rowe, as well as Gregorian chant; the Consort is accompanied by harp. The Consort commissioned the work and performed it in communities around Scotland.
- 2004: "Silhouettes" – a work composed for the consort by Corrina Hewat in 2003 based on poetry of E. E. Cummings and Judith Jardine; released on Tob Records.
- 2006: Handel's The Messiah. This was the first recording of a reconstruction of the work in its first performance, which took place in Dublin in 1742. The recording won the 2007 Gramophone Award for Best Baroque Vocal Recording and a 2008 Midem Award. This was the first Dunedin recording led by John Butt, who has conducted all the group's subsequent recordings except The Wode Collection, which is performed without conductor.
- 2008: J.S. Bach's St Matthew Passion. This was the first recording of Bach's final performing version of the work, also dated 1742. It was the second commercial recording of the work to use the one-voice-per-part vocal scoring proposed by Joshua Rifkin.
- 2008: Handel's Acis and Galatea in the original performing version of 1718. The recording was nominated for a Gramophone Award.
- 2010: J.S. Bach's Mass in B Minor. This is the first recording to use the 2006 critical edition by Joshua Rifkin, which follows Bach's final version of the score from 1748 to 1750 exclusively from beginning to end. (Other editions have included elements from Bach's 1733 version of the "Kyrie" and "Gloria", and some edits made after his death by his son, Carl Philipp Emanuel Bach). The performance uses one or two singers per vocal part in the choruses.
- 2011: The Wode Collection: a collaboration with the viola da gamba consort Fretwork, performed without conductor, featuring 16th-century music collected by the contemporaneous Scottish monk Thomas Wode.
- 2012: Handel's Esther in the first reconstructable version, from 1720.
- 2013: J.S. Bach's St. John Passion, in a liturgical reconstruction based on Good Friday Vespers services in Leipzig. In March, 2013, the disc was named "Record of the Month" by Gramophone and "Recording of the Month" by BBC Music magazine.
- September, 2013: J.S. Bach's Brandenburg Concertos with the Dunedin Consort. It was a Gramophone's "Choice" in October 2013. and was a finalist in the Baroque Instrumental category for the 2014 Gramophone Awards; it was also nominated for the International Classical Music Awards in the Baroque Instrumental category. In this recording, the ensemble used the pitch standard of A=392 or "tief-Cammerton", a whole tone below the modern standard pitch and associated with the French royal court at the time; John Butt notes that many German-speaking courts, including that at Cöthen where Bach wrote these concertos, "attempted to emulate French practice". He also mentions instruments from the time and place pitched to this standard. Still, he notes, "While Cöthen court pitch was likely to have been somewhere near this, it is unlikely that pitch was ever standardized as precisely as we might often assume or wish."
- March, 2014 Wolfgang Amadeus Mozart's Requiem. This is the first recording of David Black's new critical edition, published in 2012, of the Franz Xaver Süssmayr completion of the Requiem. The recording seeks to re-create the forces used at the first complete performance in January 1793; it also includes a performance of Black's reconstruction of a December 1791 performance of the "Introit" and "Kyrie" sections. Also performed is Mozart's Misericordias Domini, K. 222. In May 2014, the disc was named "Recording of the Month" by Gramophone. and in August, 2014, it won the Gramophone Award for 2014 for Best Choral recording. In November, 2014, it was listed among the nominees in the choral category for the 2015 International Classical Music Awards. In December 2014, it was listed as one of the five nominees for "Best Choral Performance" in the Grammy Awards.
- October, 2015: A musical reconstruction (on Linn) of J. S. Bach's first Christmas service in Leipzig, including the Magnificat in E-flat major, BWV 243a, the cantata Christen, ätzet diesen Tag, BWV 63, organ works by Bach (played by Butt), a motet by Giovanni Gabrieli, and period chorales, recorded in July 2014;
- 2015: Bach's violin concertos with Cecilia Bernardini, Huw Daniel and Alfredo Bernardini as soloists
- 2016: Bach's Christmas Oratorio, recorded in September, 2015.
- 2017: Monteverdi's Vespers 1610
- 2018: Handel's Ode for St Cecilia's Day
- 2019: Handel's Samson in its 1743 version.
