= Anthony Pleeth =

English cellist

Anthony Pleeth, born in 1948 in London, is an English cellist, specialising in the historically informed performance of music of the 18th and 19th centuries on period instruments.

== Biography and career ==
He studied cello with his father, renowned cellist William Pleeth, at the Guildhall School of Music and Drama, where he was the Gold Medallist in 1966. He made his first recording for the BBC at the age of 13. He was a founder of the Galliard Trio (with Trevor Pinnock, harpsichord and Stephen Preston, flute), with which he performed from 1965 to its disbanding in 1972.

He was the principal cellist of The Academy of Ancient Music, and later of The English Concert, leaving in 1985, but remaining a member of the English Concert Chamber Group until 1991. His recordings have included cello concertos by Vivaldi with The English Concert and The Academy of Ancient Music as well as being the cello soloist in many orchestral pieces and concerti grossi with these two orchestras. He has recorded the complete cello sonatas of Geminiani and Marcello (with Christopher Hogwood and Richard Webb,) and Vivaldi (with Robert Woolley and Suki Towb), trio sonatas by Handel and Corelli and chamber music by J. C. Bach with the English Concert Chamber Group. With fortepianist Melvyn Tan, he recorded Beethoven's complete sonatas and variations for cello and piano. His musical interests are not limited to period performance; he plays modern cello and his cello ensemble has performed and recorded Bachianas Brasileiras 1 and 5.

He was appointed professor of cello at the Guildhall School of Music & Drama in 1969 and at the Royal College of Music in 1986.

Aside from Classical appearances, he has also been on many film soundtracks, such as We Were Soldiers by Nick Glennie-Smith, Gladiator by Hans Zimmer and Lisa Gerrard and Tron: Legacy by Daft Punk.
