= Six Flute Concertos, Op. 10 (Vivaldi) =

Musical composition by Antonio Vivaldi (c. 1728)

Flute Concertos
- by Antonio Vivaldi
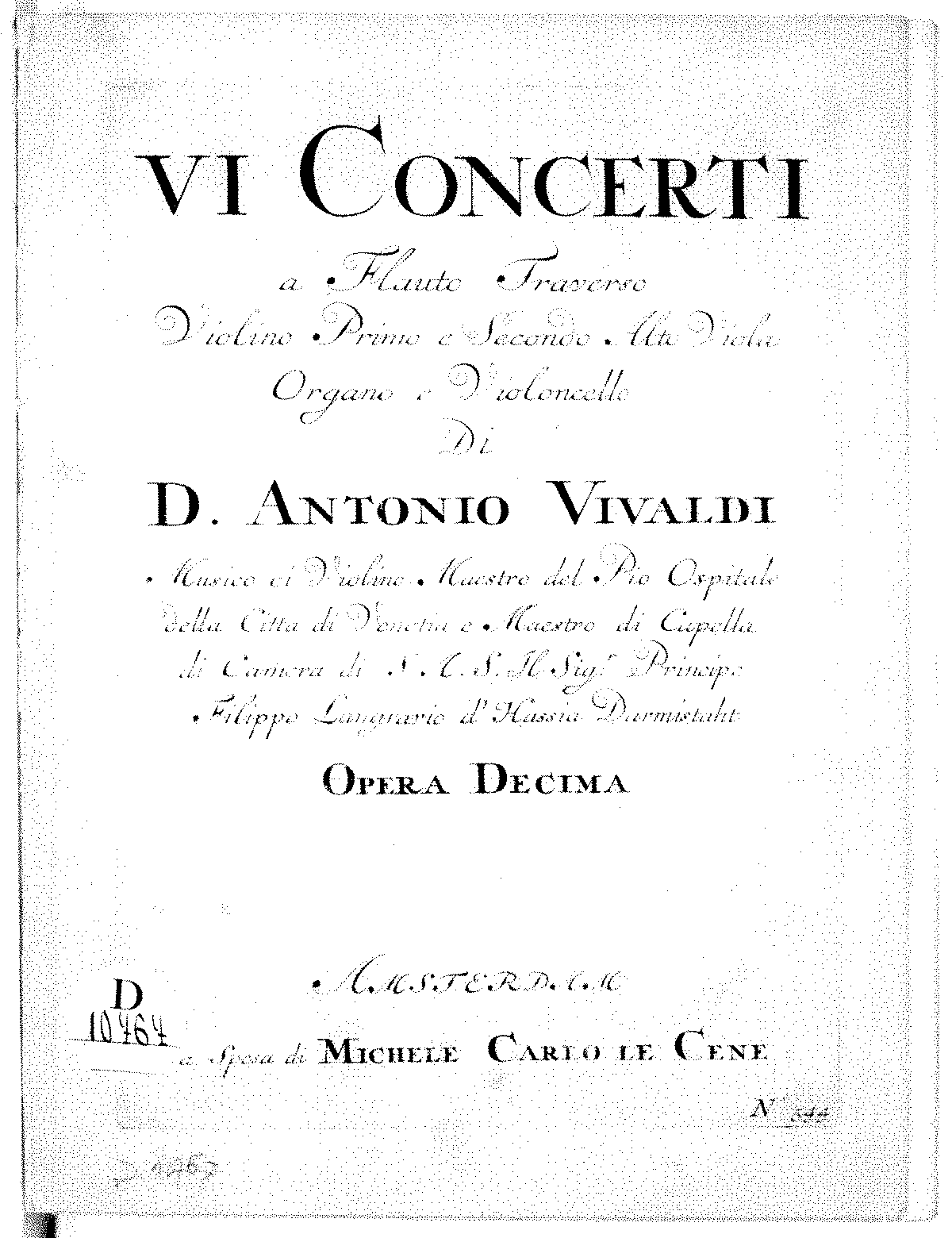
- Title page of the publication
- Opus: 10
- Published: c. 1728 in Amsterdam
- Scoring: flute; orchestra

Antonio Vivaldi wrote a set of flute concertos, Op. 10, (Note: not originally for recorder. See Sardelli, Federico Maria (2007). Vivaldi's Music for Flute And Recorder. Aldershot, England: Ashgate Publishing, Ltd. ISBN 978-0754637141. - for example, page 138: La tempesta di mare was conceived, like its predecessor, for a transverse flute in D.) that were published c. 1728 by Amsterdam publisher Michel-Charles Le Cène.

- Flute Concerto No. 1 "La Tempesta di Mare" in F major, RV 433
1. Allegro
2. Largo
3. Presto
- Flute Concerto No. 2 "La Notte" in G minor, RV 439 (see also RV 104, composed in the 1710s with chamber accompaniment)
1. Largo
2. Presto (Fantasmi)
3. Largo
4. Presto
5. Largo (Il sonno)
6. Allegro
- Flute Concerto No. 3 "Il Gardellino" in D major, RV 428
1. Allegro
2. Cantabile
3. Allegro
- Flute Concerto No. 4 in G major, RV 435
1. Allegro
2. Largo
3. Allegro
- Flute Concerto No. 5 in F major, RV 434
1. Allegro ma non tanto
2. Largo e cantabile
3. Allegro
- Flute Concerto No. 6 in G major, RV 437
1. Allegro
2. Largo
3. Allegro
