= Channel Classics Records =

- Founded: 1990
- Founder: C. Jared Sacks
- Genre: Classical
- Country of origin: Netherlands
- Location: Herwijnen
- Official website: Official website

Channel Classics Records is a record label from the Netherlands, specializing in classical music. The managing director and producer is C. Jared Sacks, who grew up in Boston. Sacks was schooled as a professional horn player at the Oberlin Conservatory of Music and the Conservatorium van Amsterdam. With fifteen years of experience in making music, Sacks decided to turn his hobby of making musical recordings into his work in 1987. The record label started in 1990 and was called after the street where he lived at the time, the Kanaalstraat in Amsterdam.

In 2006, Channel Classics began releasing records in Super Audio CD format by Chinese artists, including the China National Symphony Orchestra.

Channel Classics Records released music from musicians like Iván Fischer and the Budapest Festival Orchestra, Dejan Lazić, Lavinia Meijer, Rachel Podger and Candida Thompson.

In September 2021 Channel Classics was acquired by Outhere.
