= London Classical Players =

The London Classical Players (LCP) was a British orchestra that specialized in music following historically informed performance (HIP) practices and orchestral performances on period musical instruments. Sir Roger Norrington founded the LCP in 1978. From 1978 to 1992, the concertmaster of the London Classical Players was baroque violinist John Holloway. The LCP made a variety of recordings for EMI Classics. Many of the players in the LCP overlapped with four other major HIP orchestral ensembles, the Academy of Ancient Music, the English Concert, the Orchestra of the Age of Enlightenment, and the English Baroque Soloists.

Among their famous concert series was "The Beethoven Experience" in 1987, and "The Berlioz Experience" in 1988. In 1996, the LCP was invited to open the Prague Spring Festival in the traditional opening festival concert of Bedrich Smetana's Ma Vlast, a controversial decision at the time.

In 1997 the LCP formally dissolved and its work was absorbed into the Orchestra of the Age of Enlightenment.

== Selected discography ==
- Ludwig van Beethoven: The Nine Symphonies, Virgin Classics 5619432 (reissue)
- Ludwig van Beethoven: The Five Piano Concertos, Virgin Classics 5622422 (reissue)
- Hector Berlioz: Symphonie fantastique, Overture Les Francs-Juges, Virgin Classics 3632862 (reissue)
- Johannes Brahms: Ein deutsches Requiem, Virgin Veritas 5616052 (reissue)
- Anton Bruckner: Symphony No. 3, Virgin Veritas 4820912 (reissue)
- Georg Friedrich Handel: Water Music, Music for the Royal Fireworks, Virgin Veritas (reissue)
- Joseph Haydn: Symphonies Nos. 99 and 100 (EMI Classics), 101 and 102 (EMI Classics), 103 and 104 (EMI Classics)
- Felix Mendelssohn: Symphonies Nos. 3 and 4, Virgin Veritas 3499832 (reissue)
- Wolfgang Amadeus Mozart:
  - Symphonies Nos. 38- 41, Virgin Veritas 5620102 (reissue)
  - Die Zauberflöte, Virgin Veritas 4820732
  - Don Giovanni, Virgin Veritas 5622672 (reissue with Die Zauberflöte)
  - Piano Concertos Nos. 20, 23–25, Virgin Veritas 5623432 (reissue)
  - Requiem/Masonic Funeral Music/"Ave verum corpus", Virgin Veritas 5615202
- Henry Purcell: The Fairy Queen, Virgin Veritas 5619552
- Gioacchino Rossini: Overtures, EMI Classics
- Franz Schubert: Symphonies Nos. 4-6 and 8, Virgin Veritas 5622272 (reissue)
- Robert Schumann: Symphonies Nos. 3 and 4, Virgin Veritas 3499832 (reissue)
- Bedřich Smetana: Ma Vlast, Virgin Veritas 5453012
- Richard Wagner: Preludes to Rienzi, Die Meistersinger von Nürnberg and Parsifal, Prelude and Liebestod from Tristan und Isolde, Act III Prelude to Lohengrin, Siegfried Idyll, Virgin Veritas 4820912 (reissue)
- Carl Maria von Weber: Symphonies Nos. 1 and 2, Konzertstück, EMI Classics
