= The English Concert =

Period instrument orchestra based in London

- Orchestra
- Founded: 1972
- Location: London
- Music director: Harry Bicket
- Website: englishconcert.co.uk

The English Concert is a baroque orchestra playing on period instruments based in London. Founded in 1972 and directed from the harpsichord by Trevor Pinnock for 30 years, it is now directed by harpsichordist Harry Bicket. Nadja Zwiener has been orchestra leader (concertmaster) since September 2007.

== The English Concert and Choir ==
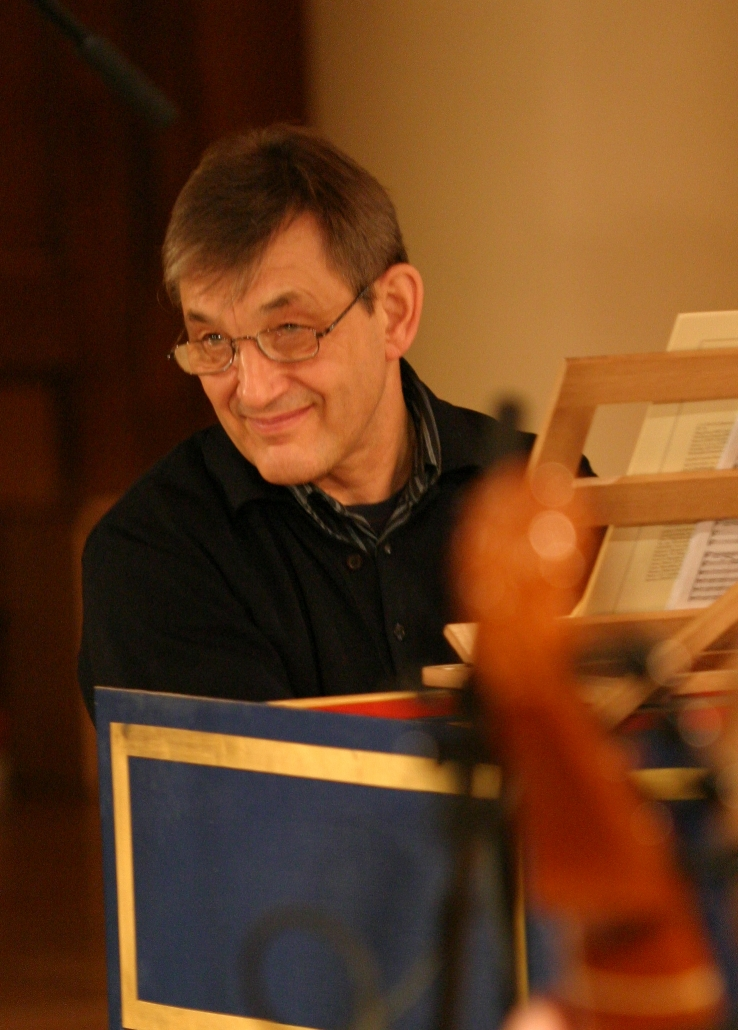
Founding director Trevor Pinnock in 2006

The English Concert was founded by Trevor Pinnock and others in November 1972. The date of foundation is often given as 1973, probably because they started with seven people and only later progressed onto the orchestral repertoire as their number increased. They were one of the first orchestras dedicated to performing baroque and classical music on period instruments, their repertoire from then to now ranging approximately from Monteverdi to Mozart.

Their London debut was at the English Bach Festival in 1973, which led to their first recording in 1974, Sons of Bach harpsichord concertos, on CRD records. They first played at The Proms in 1980, and toured North America in 1983. The group gained much recognition from their prolific number of recordings with Archiv Produktion from 1978 until 1995, during which they recorded most of the major baroque repertoire.

The Choir of the English Concert (or permutations of that phrase), was formed in 1983 to perform Rameau's Acante et Céphise. It continued assembling as needed for recordings and performances with the group until the mid-1990s, when the decision was made to make it a regular choir on a level with the orchestra, in preparation for their performance of Bach's Mass in B Minor. Performances of oratorios and large-scale vocal works became more common after this. Rather than use established soloists in the arias and solo sections of these works, the choir was thought to be so good that the soloist material was shared amongst the regular members, a practice that Andrew Manze continued.

From 1996 to 2001 The English Concert was engaged in a major concert project entitled 'Great Religious Works of the 18th Century'. This was launched with Messiah performances, continuing in 1997 with J. S. Bach's Mass in B Minor performed in Italy, France, Germany, Austria and at the BBC Proms. Next was Bach's St. John Passion and Mozart's Requiem in 1999. In 2000 there were 18 performances of Bach's St. Matthew Passion, in locations from Tenerife to Tokyo. The six-year cycle was completed with a performance of Haydn's Die Schöpfung at the 2001 Lucerne Festival. The Christmas Oratorio was performed in Spain, Italy and Germany in December 2002.

Trevor Pinnock stepped down as director in 2003 to pursue solo and other conducting projects. Orchestra members decided to hand over to violinist Andrew Manze, who was at that time associate director of The Academy of Ancient Music. One of his first projects as director was a reconstruction of the first performance (in 1717) of Handel's Water Music, sailing down the River Thames on a barge. This was filmed for the BBC and released on DVD. With Manze's leadership came a new series of recordings with Harmonia Mundi.

The English Concert continues to appear at the major London venues, including the Wigmore Hall, Cadogan Hall and South Bank Centre, as well as touring internationally and playing at major music festivals. In September 2007, harpsichordist Harry Bicket succeeded Andrew Manze as director. Notable collaborations in the last three seasons have been with such internationally acclaimed figures in historical performance as violinist Fabio Biondi, oboist Alfredo Bernardini, conductor Laurence Cummings, director Rinaldo Alessandrini, harpsichordist Mahan Esfahani, soprano Elizabeth Watts, countertenor David Daniels, and director and recorder player Maurice Steger.

In 2021, under the leadership of Bicket, The English Concert embarked on a project entitled Handel for All with the intention of filming and releasing the complete works of George Frideric Handel online and free of charge. Organised in tandem with the ensemble's own performance seasons and touring schedules, the project has also included the building of educational materials, programme notes and "academic context" to accompany the recordings and performances. As of November 2026, the following works have been recorded visually:

- Brockes Passion
- The cantatas Tanti strali al sen mi scocchi, HWV 197 and Armida abbandonata, HWV 105
- Music for the Royal Fireworks
- The Foundling Anthem, HWV 268
- The oratorios Saul and Samson
- The operas Rodelinda and Rinaldo

The four studio recordings mentioned below (namely, Rodelinda, La resurrezione, Serse and Giulio Cesare) were all released alongside the Handel for All project.

=== Related ensembles ===
There was, for a time, a chamber ensemble drawn from the principal members, The English Concert Chamber Ensemble, which released a few recordings as 'Members of The English Concert' or using their individual names. The English Concert Winds were a group of wind players from the orchestra who released a recording.

=== Music directors ===
- Trevor Pinnock (1972–2003)
- Andrew Manze (2003–2007)
- Harry Bicket (2007–present)

=== Some notable past members ===
Violin:

- Simon Standage – leader 1972–1991 – left to direct Collegium Musicum 90 and become associate director of the Academy of Ancient Music
- Elizabeth Wilcock
- Micaela Comberti
- Graham Cracknell
- Peter Hanson – leader 1992–1997 – now leads the Orchestre Révolutionnaire et Romantique
- Rachel Podger – leader 1997–2002
- Roy Goodman
- John Holloway

Viola:

- Trevor Jones
- Katherine McGillivray
- Alfonso Leal del Ojo Chamorro
- Louise Hogan

Cello:

- Anthony Pleeth – 1972–1985
- Jaap ter Linden
- David Watkin
- Jane Coe
- Alison McGillivray
- Jonathan Manson
- Joseph Crouch
- Richard Webb

Violone:

- Keith Marjoram
- Amanda MacNamara
- Peter McCarthy

Recorder:

- Philip Pickett

Horn:

- Anthony Halstead

Flute:

- Stephen Preston
- Nicholas McGegan
- Lisa Beznosiuk

Oboe:

- David Reichenberg
- Paul Goodwin

Bassoon:

- Alberto Grazzi

Lute:

- Nigel North

Trumpet:

- Michael Laird

== Recordings ==
Under the direction of Trevor Pinnock:

Under the direction of Andrew Manze:

- C.P.E. Bach: Symphonies 1-4, cello concerto in A (Harmonia Mundi, 2006)
- Biber: Missa Christi resurgentis (Harmonia Mundi, 2005)
- Handel: As steals the morn... Arias & scenes for tenor (with Mark Padmore, tenor) (Harmonia Mundi, 2007)
- Mozart: Eine kleine Nachtmusik (Harmonia Mundi, 2003)
- Mozart: 3 violin concertos (nos. 3, 4, 5) (Harmonia Mundi, 2006)
- Vivaldi: Concertos for the Emperor (Harmonia Mundi, 2004)

Under the direction of Harry Bicket:

- Bach: Sacred arias & cantatas (with David Daniels, countertenor) (Virgin Classics, 2009)
- Bach: Cantatas & arias (with Elizabeth Watts, soprano) (Harmonia Mundi, 2011)
- Blow, Gibbons, Locke, Purcell: Purcell, Locke, Blow & Gibbons (with Rosemary Joshua, soprano and Sarah Connolly, mezzo-soprano) (Wigmore Hall Live, 2017)
- Dall'Abaco, Alessandro Marcello, Porpora, Tartini, Telemann: Dall'Abaco, Porpora, Marcello, Tartini & Telemann (Signum Classics, 2018)
- Dowland, Monteverdi, Purcell, Bach, Handel, Pergolesi: Beauty of the Baroque (with Danielle de Niese, soprano and Andreas Scholl, countertenor) (Decca Records, 2011)
- Handel: Handel duets (with Rosemary Joshua, soprano and Sarah Connolly, mezzo-soprano) (Chandos Records, 2010)
- Handel: Il caro Sassone: Handel in Italy (with Lucy Crowe, soprano) (Harmonia Mundi, 2011)
- Handel: Handel arias (with Alice Coote, mezzo-soprano) (Hyperion Records, 2014)
- Handel: Rodelinda (with Lucy Crowe, soprano, Iestyn Davies, countertenor, Joshua Ellicott, tenor, Brandon Cedel, bass, Jess Dandy, contralto and Tim Mead, countertenor) (Linn Records, 2021)
- Handel: La resurrezione (with Sophie Bevan, soprano, Lucy Crowe, soprano, Iestyn Davies, countertenor, Hugo Hymas, tenor and Ashley Riches, bass) (Linn Records, 2022)
- Handel: Serse (with Emily D'Angelo, mezzo-soprano, Paula Murrihy, mezzo-soprano, Daniela Mack, mezzo-soprano, Lucy Crowe, soprano, Mary Bevan, soprano, Neal Davies, bass-baritone and William Dazeley, baritone) (Linn Records, 2023)
- Handel: Giulio Cesare (with Christophe Dumaux, countertenor, Thomas Chenhall, baritone, Beth Taylor, mezzo-soprano, Paula Murrihy, mezzo-soprano, Louise Alder, soprano, Meili Li, countertenor, John Holiday, countertenor, Morgan Pearse, baritone) (Linn Records, 2026)
