= Arion Baroque Orchestra =

Canadian baroque orchestra

- Orchestra
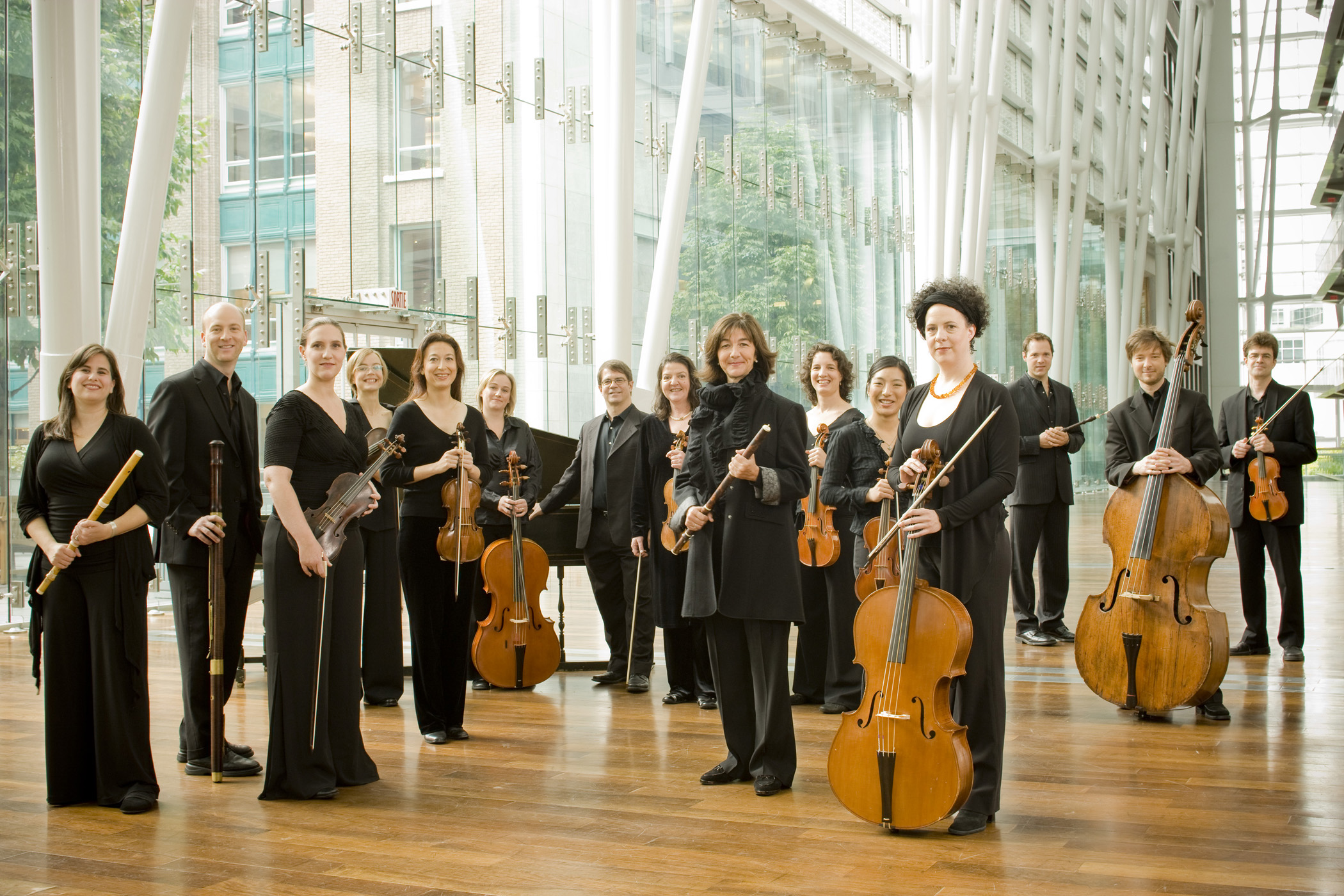
- Arion Baroque Orchestra in 2009
- Native name: Arion Orchestre Baroque
- Founded: 1981
- Location: Montreal, Quebec, Canada
- Music director: Claire Guimond and Mathieu Lussier
- Website: http://www.arionbaroque.com

Arion Baroque Orchestra, founded in 1981, is a Canadian baroque orchestra based in Montreal, Quebec, specializing in music of the 18th century performed on period instruments.

== History ==
Arion Baroque Orchestra was founded in Montreal in 1981 (first under the name of Arion Ensemble). Originally, it was a quartet whose members included flautist Claire Guimond, violinist Chantal Rémillard, harpsichordist Hank Knox, and viola da gamba player Betsy MacMillan.

The ensemble's name comes from Greek mythology: Arion is a musician from antiquity who avoided drowning by charming a dolphin with his singing. It is also the name of a cantata by André Campra that was played at the first concert of the group.

Since the mid-1990s, the original quartet has expanded with the aim of developing into a baroque orchestra, and thus began to explore the repertoire from the 2nd half of the 18th century, most notably the music of Haydn and Mozart.

Guimond was the sole artistic director of the orchestra from 1981 to 2019. During the 2019–2020 season, she shared the artistic direction role with bassoonist Mathieu Lussier, who succeeded her in the following 2020/2021 season.

Arion Baroque Orchestra does not have a principal conductor and prefers to collaborate with invited soloists and leaders. Some of the collaborators Arion has shared the stage with over the years are sopranos Suzie LeBlanc and Karina Gauvin, recorder player Vincent Lauzer, violinists Stefano Montanari, Enrico Onofri, and Monica Huggett, cellist Jaap ter Linden, harpsichordists Christophe Rousset, Garry Cooper, and Alexander Weimann, flautist Barthold Kuijken, and clarinettist Lorenzo Coppola.

Arion Baroque Orchestra has toured Québec, Canada, the United States, Mexico, Brazil, Japan, and Europe.

Arion has a residency at Bourgie Hall of the Montreal Museum of Fine Arts, where it has an annual subscription series of five programs. The orchestra also performs at other venues in Montreal, most notably through the Conseil des arts de Montréal touring program, but also at the main music festivals across Quebec and Canada such as Domaine Forget, the Montreal Bach Festival, the Ottawa Chamberfest, and the Lamèque International Baroque Music Festival in New Brunswick.

== Awards and distinctions ==
The orchestra has received several awards and distinctions for its recordings and concerts: nine Prix Opus^{,} of the Conseil Québécois de la Musique, two Félix Awards^{,} of ADISQ, one Juno Award of the Canadian Academy of Recording Arts and Sciences, and one Diapason d'Or from the French music magazine Diapason.

== Discography ==
The discography of Arion Baroque Orchestra comprises around thirty titles on four labels: early-music.com, ATMA Classique, Analekta, and the Canadian Broadcasting Corporation.

- 1985 : Leclair, Hotteterre and Guillemain – Entre Paris et Versailles
- 1990 : Quantz, Graun, Couperin, etc. – Baroque chamber music with recorder, with Marion Verbruggen (recorder)
- 1991 : Telemann – Paris quartets [MVCD1040]
- 1993 : Telemann, Quentin et Mondonville – Conversations en musique
- 1994 : Clérambault, Campra and Montéclair – Four Major French Cantatas from the 17th and 18th Centuries, with Danièle Forget (soprano)
- 1995 : Bach – The Musical Offering
- 1995 : Un concert en Nouvelle-France, with Richard Duguay (tenor)
- 1996 : Bach – 6 Trio Sonatas, BWV 525–530
- 1997 : Telemann – Tafelmusik (first production)
- 1997 : O’Carolan's Harp, with Siobhan McDonnall (Celtic harp)
- 1997 : Boismortier – Les Quatre Saisons, with Isabelle Desrochers (soprano), Hervé Lamy (tenor) and Max van Egmond (baritone)
- 1998 : Leclair – Concertos, with Claire Guimond (flute) and Monica Huggett (violin and direction)
- 2001 : Bach – Orchestral suites, with Claire Guimond (flute), Chantal Rémillard (violin), Hank Knox and Luc Beauséjour (harpsichords), directed by Barthold Kuijken
- 2001 : Bach – Suites and Concertos, directed by Jaap ter Linden
- 2001 : Handel – Sacred Arias, with Daniel Taylor (countertenor), directed by Monica Huggett
- 2002 : Handel – Love Duets, with Suzie LeBlanc (soprano), Daniel Taylor (countertenor) and Stephen Stubbs (lute, baroque guitar and direction)
- 2003 : Vivaldi, Handel and Scarlatti – Maria, Madre di Dio, with Agnès Mellon (soprano) and Matthew White (countertenor), directed by Monica Huggett
- 2005 : Faustina Bordoni – Visages d’une Prima Donna, with Kimberly Barber (mezzo-soprano), Jonathan Carle (baritone), directed by Monica Huggett
- 2005 : Telemann – Tutti flauti ! with Matthias Maute and Sophie Larivière (recorders), Claire Guimond and Mika Putterman (flutes), directed by Jaap ter Linden
- 2006 : Vivaldi – Chiaroscuro with Claire Guimond (flute) and Mathieu Lussier (bassoon)
- 2007 : Telemann – Les trésors cachés, directed by Jaap ter Linden
- 2007 : Rebel – Plaisirs champêtres, directed by Daniel Cuiller
- 2008 : Corrette – Symphonies des noël et Concertos comiques
- 2009 : Haydn, La Passione – Symphonies 41, 49 et 44, directed by Gary Cooper
- 2010 : CPE Bach – Symphonies and concertos, with Claire Guimond (flute) and Gary Cooper (harpsichord and direction)
- 2012 : Bach – St John Passion, with Les Voix Baroques, directed by Alexander Weimann
- 2012 : Handel, Vivaldi and Vinci – Prima Donna, with Karina Gauvin (soprano) and Alexander Weimann (direction)
- 2014 : Hidden Treasures of Italy – Violin Concertos by Lidarti, Razetti, Montanari, Nardini and Sirmen, with Stefano Montanari (violin and direction)
- 2017 : Quantz and Telemann – Rebelles Baroques, with Claire Guimond and Alexa Raine-Wright (flutes), Jean-Louis Blouin (viola) and Alexander Weimann
- 2017 : Bach – Magnificat, with Johanna Winkel and Johanette Zomer (sopranos), James Laing (countertenor), Zachary Wilder (tenor), Matthew Brook (bass), directed by Alexander Weimann
- 2018 : Vivaldi – Concertos for Recorder, with Vincent Lauzer (recorder), directed by Alexander Weimann
- 2020 : Telemann – Concertos and Overture, with Vincent Lauzer (recorder), Mathieu Lussier (bassoon and direction) and Alexander Weimann (direction)
