= Early-music.com =

Canadian record label

early-music.com
- Founded: 2002
- Founder: Claire Guimond
- Distributor(s): Naxos (company)
- Genre: Classical music Early music Baroque music
- Country of origin: Canada
- Official website: http://www.early-music.com/

early-music.com is a Canadian record label, based in Montreal. It is dedicated to the promotion of early music performance on period instruments.

== History ==
early-music.com was founded in 2002 in Montreal by Claire Guimond. The company has about 25 titles in its catalogue, 11 of which are with the Arion Baroque Orchestra.

The label's motto is "world class early music on period instruments". It explores the European repertoire of the 17th and 18th centuries.

Its catalogue is distributed internationally by Naxos.

== Artists ==
- Alison Melville, Baroque Flute
- Arion Baroque Orchestra
- Claire Guimond, Baroque Flute
- Gary Cooper, Harpsichord
- Hank Knox, Harpsichord
- Jaap ter Linden, Cello
- Johanne Couture, Harpsichord
- Luc Beauséjour, Harpsichord
- Mathieu Lussier, Bassoon
- Matthew Wadsworth, Lute
- Monica Huggett, Violin
- Timothy Roberts, Keyboards
