= Claire Guimond =

Canadian flutist (born 1955)

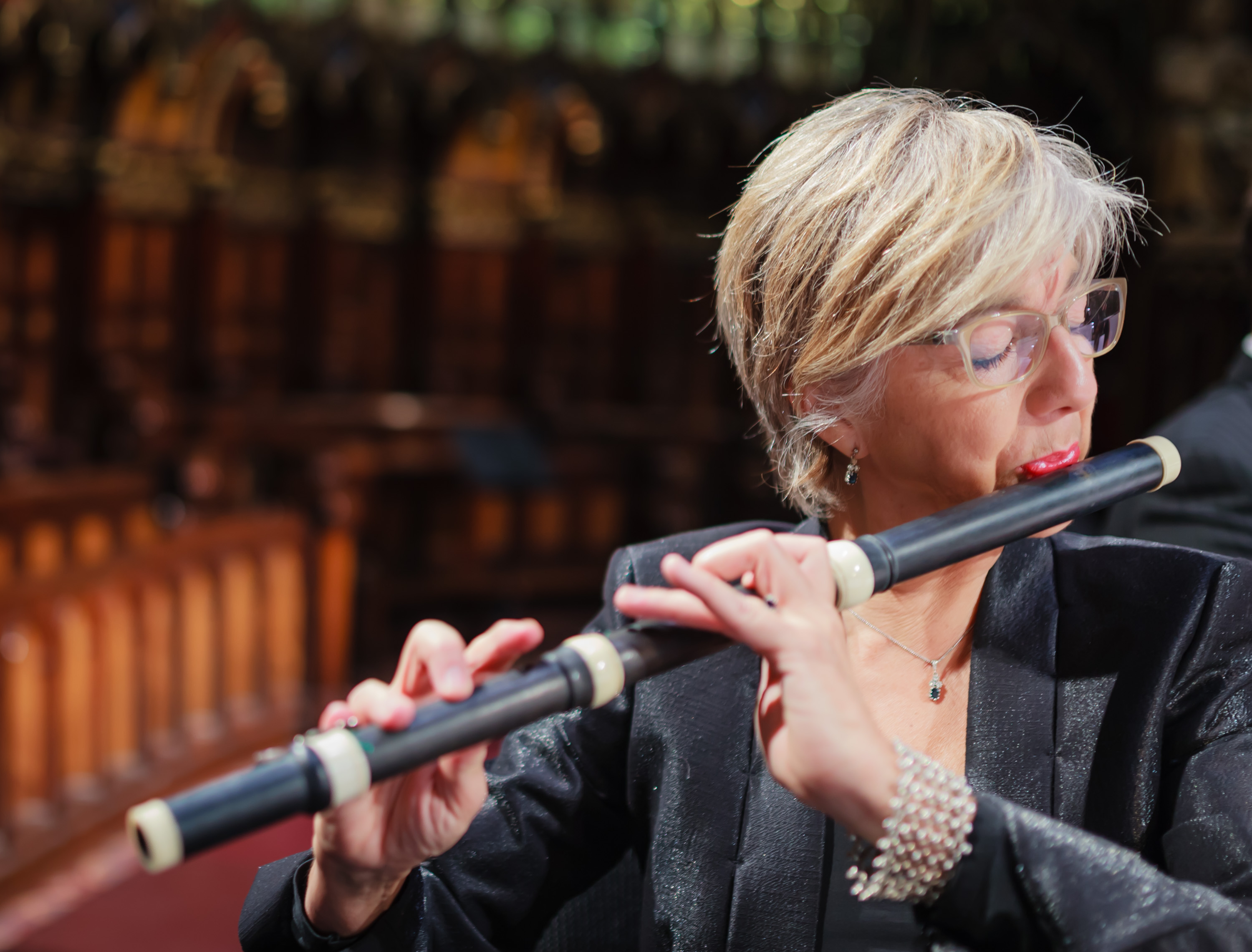

Background information
- Born: 26 October 1955 (age 70); Montreal, Quebec, Canada
- Genre: Classical
- Occupations: Flutist, artistic director, teacher
- Instrument: Flute
- Labels: early-music.com, ATMA Classique, Analekta, Canadian Broadcasting Company

Claire Guimond (born October 26, 1955, in Montreal, Quebec) is a Canadian flutist who was the founding member and former Artistic Director of Arion Baroque Orchestra.

== Biography ==
Guimond was a founding member of the Arion Baroque Orchestra and served as the artistic director from 1981 to 2020. During this time, Guimond invited conductors and soloists specializing in early music to lead the orchestra. They collaborated with musicologists in Italy, Spain, and the United Kingdom to create world-premiere recordings and performances of rediscovered works.

Guimond taught baroque flute at McGill University from 1980 to 2019 at the Baccalaureate, Master's, and Ph.D. levels. She taught chamber music from 1980 to 1997. She regularly conducts master classes and teaches at the Tafelmusik Baroque Summer Institute, which has been held in Toronto every summer since 2006.

In 2001, Guimond founded Les Productions early-music.com, a record label devoted to early music repertoire. She was president of the Conseil Québécois de la Musique from 1994 to 1997.

As a soloist and orchestra member, she performed with Arion in North America, South America, Europe, and Asia. During the 2019–2020 season, she was co-artistic director of Arion with Mathieu Lussier, her successor as artistic director.

Guimond has recorded over 40 CDs, including nearly 30 with Arion Baroque Orchestra. She has recorded solo albums with harpsichordists Luc Beauséjour and Gary Cooper, cellist Jaap ter Linden and violinist Monica Huggett, among others.

She has made several radio and television recordings for Canadian, British, Belgian, Irish, and Mexican stations. She has performed under conductors specialized in baroque music, such as Ton Koopman, Masaaki Suzuki, Christophe Rousset, Andrew Parrott, Jordi Savall, Philippe Herreweghe, Rinaldo Alessandrini, Barthold Kuijken, Kent Nagano, Bruno Weil and Andrea Marcon. From 2000 to 2005, she served as the artistic director for the Lamèque International Baroque Music Festival. She judged for International Festival of Early Music in Val de Loire (France) under the presidency of William Christie in July 2017.

== Discography (selection) ==
Claire Guimond has recorded more than 40 CDs, primarily as a soloist.

Soloist

- 1985 : Leclair, Hotteterre et Guillemain – Entre Paris et Versailles, with Chantal Rémillard (violin), Betsy MacMillan (viol), Hank Knox (harpsichord) et Arion Ensemble [FL23020]
- 1991 : Telemann – Paris Quartets, with Chantal Rémillard (violin), Betsy MacMillan (viol), Hank Knox (harpsichord), Christina Mahler (cello) et Arion Ensemble [MVCD1040]
- 1991 : Stamitz, Richter, Haydn, Gluck – Flute Concertos of the 18th Century, with Barthold Kuijken (flute), Tafelmusik and Jeanne Lamon (violin and direction) [SK48045]
- 1993 : Telemann, Quentin et Mondonville – Conversations en musique, with Chantal Rémillard (violin), Betsy MacMillan (viol), Hank Knox (harpsichord), Susan Napper (cello) and Arion Ensemble [FL23078]
- 1995 : Boismortier – 6 Sonatas for Flute and Harpsichord, Op. 91, with Luc Beauséjour (harpsichord) [FL23008]
- 1995 : Bach – The Music Offering, with Chantal Rémillard (violin), Betsy MacMillan (viol), Hank Knox (harpsichord) and Arion Baroque Orchestra [FL23065]
- 1995 : Telemann – 12 Fantasias for Flute without Bass [FL28053]
- 1996 : Bach – 6 Trio Sonatas, BWV 525-530, with Chantal Rémillard (violin), Betsy MacMillan (viol and cello), Hank Knox (harpsichord) and Arion Ensemble [FL23086]
- 1997 : Telemann – Tafelmusik (first production), with Arion Baroque Orchestra [FL23118]
- 1998 : Leclair – Concertos, with Monica Huggett et Arion Baroque Orchestra [ACD22143]
- 1999 : Blavet – Sonatas for Flute and Basso continuo, John Toll (harpsichord) and Jonathan Manson (viol) [ACD22204]
- 2001 : Mozart – Flute Quartets, with the Trio Sonnerie, directed by Monica Huggett [EMCCD 7754]
- 2001 : Bach – Orchestral Suites (Orchestral Suite No.2 in B minor, BWV 1067), with Arion Baroque Orchestra, directed by Barthold Kuijken [ACD22257]
- 2001 : Bach – Suites and Concertos (Brandenburg Concerto No. 5 et Concerto for flute, violin and harpsichord, BWV 1044), with Arion Baroque Orchestra, directed by Jaap ter Linden [EMCCD7753]
- 2002 : Telemann – 6 Concertos, with Luc Beauséjour (harpsichord) [EMCCD7755]
- 2005 : Telemann – Tutti Flauti !, with Matthias Maute and Sophie Larivière (recorders), Mika Putterman (flute) and Arion Baroque Orchestra, directed by Jaap ter Linden [EMCCD7763]
- 2005 : De Bach à Mozart – Sur les traces de la Sonate en trio, with Gary Cooper (harpsichord) and Jaap ter Linden (cello) [EMCCD7762]
- 2006 : Vivaldi – Chiaroscuro, with Mathieu Lussier (bassoon) and Arion Baroque Orchestra [EMCCD7764]
- 2007 : Telemann – Les Trésors Cachés, with Arion Baroque Orchestra, directed by Jaap ter Linden [EMCCD7766]
- 2010 : C.P.E. Bach – Symphonies and Concertos (Flute Concerto, Wq 22), with Gary Cooper (harpsichord and direction) and Arion Baroque Orchestra [EMCCD7771]
- 2017 : Quantz and Telemann – Rebelles Baroques, with Alexander Weimann (direction) and Arion Baroque Orchestra [EMCCD7777]

Orchestra

- 2007 : Rebel – Plaisirs Champêtres, with Arion Baroque Orchestra, directed by Daniel Cuiller [EMCCD7765]
- 2008 : Corrette – Symphonies des Noël et Concertos Comiques, with Arion Baroque Orchestra [EMCCD7768]
- 2012 : Bach – St John Passion, with Les Voix Baroques and Arion Baroque Orchestra, directed by Alexander Weimann [ACD22611]
- 2017 : Bach – Magnificat, with Arion Baroque Orchestra, directed by Alexander Weimann [ACD22727]

== Awards and distinctions ==
The Arion Baroque Orchestra won multiple awards for their concerts and recordings with Claire Guimond at their helm as artistic director: nine Prix Opus^{,} of the Conseil Québécois de la Musique, two Félix Awards^{,} of ADISQ, a Juno Award of the Canadian Academy of Recording Arts and Sciences, and a Diapason d'Or from the French music magazine Diapason.

- 1984 : 3rd Prize at Bruges International Musica Antiqua Competition (Belgium)
- 2019 : Betty Webster Award
- 2020 : Prix Opus, artistic director of the year
