= Baroque orchestra =

Historical ensemble for Baroque period music

A Baroque orchestra is an ensemble for mixed instruments that existed during the Baroque era of Western Classical music, commonly identified as 1600–1750. Baroque orchestras are typically much smaller, in terms of the number of performers, than their Romantic-era counterparts. Baroque orchestras originated in France where Jean-Baptiste Lully added the newly re-designed hautbois (oboe) and transverse flutes to his orchestra, Les Vingt-quatre Violons du Roi ("The Twenty-Four Violins of the King"). As well as violins and woodwinds, baroque orchestras often contained basso continuo instruments such as the theorbo, the lute, the harpsichord and the pipe organ.

In the Baroque period, the size of an orchestra was not standardised. There were large differences in size, instrumentation and playing styles—and therefore in orchestral soundscapes and palettes—between the various European regions. The 'Baroque orchestra' ranged from smaller orchestras (or ensembles) with one player per part, to larger scale orchestras with many players per part. Examples of the smaller variety were Bach's orchestras, for example in Koethen where he had access to an ensemble of up to 18 players. Examples of large scale Baroque orchestras would include Corelli's orchestra in Rome which ranged between 35 and 80 players for day-to-day performances, being enlarged to 150 players for special occasions.

== Early-music ensembles today ==
The term Baroque orchestra is commonly used today to refer to chamber orchestras giving historically informed performances of baroque or classical music on period Baroque instruments or replica instruments.

The period-instrument revival of the 1970s inspired the development of the first period-instrument baroque orchestras, led by Nikolaus Harnoncourt, Gustav Leonhardt, Frans Bruggen and Terrence Holford.

Since the 1970s many baroque orchestras have been formed across Europe, as well as some in North America. Baroque orchestras active in the 2010s include:

- Academy of Ancient Music
- American Bach Soloists
- Amsterdam Baroque Orchestra
- Apollo’s Fire: The Cleveland Baroque Orchestra
- Arcadia Players
- Arion Baroque Orchestra
- Les Arts Florissants
- Atlanta Baroque Orchestra
- Barocco sempre giovane
- Boston Baroque
- Bourbon Baroque: Louisville's Period Instrument Ensemble
- La Chapelle Rhénane
- Collegium 1704
- Collegium Marianum
- Concerto Italiano
- Concerto Köln
- The English Baroque Soloists
- The English Concert
- Les Esprits Animaux
- Europa Galante
- Florilegium
- La Folia Barockorchester
- Freiburger Barockorchester
- Göteborg Baroque
- Il Giardino Armonico
- The Hanover Band
- Hespèrion XX and Hespèrion XXI
- Indianapolis Baroque Orchestra
- Modo Antiquo
- Musica Antiqua Köln
- Musicians of the King's Road (Finnish: Kuninkaantien muusikot)
- Netherlands Bach Society (Dutch: Nederlandse Bachvereniging)
- New Dutch Academy
- New Trinity Baroque
- Newport Baroque Orchestra
- Orchestra of the Age of Enlightenment
- Les Paladins
- Philharmonia Baroque Orchestra
- Portland Baroque Orchestra
- Taverner Consort and Players
- Tafelmusik Baroque Orchestra
- Tempesta di Mare: The Philadelphia Baroque Orchestra
- Venice Baroque Orchestra
- Wrocław Baroque Orchestra

== Instrumentation ==
=== Baroque orchestra ===
Woodwinds
2 Flutes
2 Oboes
2 Bassoons

Brass
2 Natural horns
2 Natural trumpets

Percussion
Timpani (e.g., Handel's Messiah)

Keyboards and other chord-playing instruments selected by the ensemble leader
Harpsichord
Pipe organ
Lute
Theorbo

Strings
Violin I
Violin II
Viola
Violoncello
Double bass (and/or bass violones or other low-pitched bowed strings)

== Recordings of baroque music ==
- Corelli Concerti Grossi
- Antonio Vivaldi, Pietro Locatelli

== See also ==
- List of early music ensembles
