= Avison Ensemble =

The Avison Ensemble
- Origin: Newcastle upon Tyne, England, United Kingdom
- Genres: Classical
- Occupation: Chamber orchestra
- Years active: 1985 – present
- Labels: Divine Art, Naxos, Linn Records
- Members: Executive Director; Gordon Dixon; Music Director and Violin; Pavlo Beznosiuk; Violin; Caroline Balding; Viola; Rachel Byrt; Cello; Richard Tunnicliffe; Lute and Archlute; Paula Chateauneuf; Harpsichord; Roger Hamilton
- Website: www.avisonensemble.com

The Avison Ensemble is one of England's leading exponents of classical music on period instruments. It is named after Charles Avison (1709–1770), the Newcastle-born composer, conductor and organist, considered ‘the most important English concerto composer of the 18th Century’. Comprising some of Europe's leading musicians and soloists, the Ensemble is directed by violinist Pavlo Beznosiuk. It varies in numbers depending on the repertoire being performed, and is typically of chamber ensemble or concerto grosso size, expanding to full chamber orchestra when needed.

== Formation of the Avison Ensemble ==
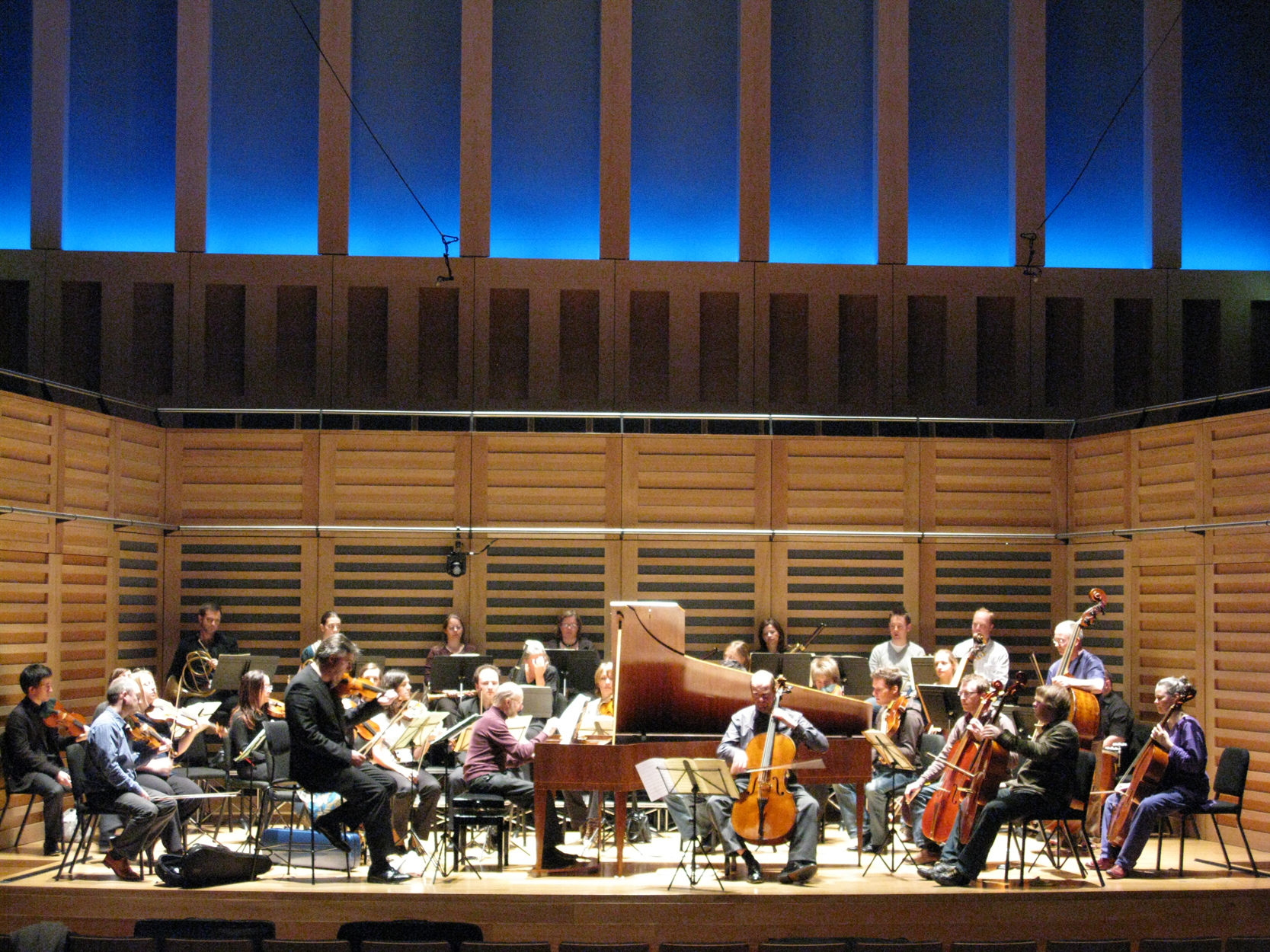
The Avison Ensemble in rehearsal at Kings Place, London

The Ensemble was formed in 1985 by Newcastle-born cellist and musical director Gordon Dixon after discovering a collection of 18th-century music at the back of a cupboard which was found to be a number of concertos by the long-neglected Avison.

Avison wrote more than eighty concertos, which drew the great musicians of the day to perform in Newcastle. He worked with figures such as the astronomer William Herschel who was leader of Avison's orchestra, the composer William Shield (his pupil from Whickham and to whom is owed the memory of Auld Lang Syne), the Newcastle glass enameller Ralph Beilby who was a bass player in Avison's orchestra, and the English wood engraver Thomas Bewick, who as a young lad engraved the concert tickets.

Despite having written over eighty string concertos, Avison's music had been rarely performed since his death, either on modern or period instruments. The Ensemble was formed with the aim of performing, recording and publicising Avison's works and to bring to public attention the many other neglected British composers of the baroque period, such as John Garth, Thomas Arne, and William Boyce, as well as performing the traditional repertoire.

== Workbooks and the Avison Archive ==
A page from Charles Avison's second workbook

As the author of An Essay on Musical Expression (1752), Avison was a pioneer in the field of musical aesthetics, and the dominant force in the musical life of Newcastle upon Tyne and the surrounding area.

Avison's two Workbooks are important new sources for the interpretation and performance of his works and these have recently been acquired by the Avison Ensemble. In 2001, with the assistance of the Heritage Lottery Fund, the first Avison workbook was acquired at Sotheby's, London. Incredibly, less than a year later, a second workbook was discovered and acquired.

Both manuscripts contain many unpublished works by the composer and several of his contemporaries. Avison's second workbook contains autograph concerto transcriptions of Domenico Scarlatti's sonatas, scribal manuscripts of Avison's 12 Concerti Grossi Op.2, heavily revised and annotated in the composer's hand, and transcriptions in full score of Francesco Geminiani's Concerti Grossi Op.7 as well as his unpublished arrangements of Geminiani's Violin Sonatas Opp. 1 and 4.

Both workbooks have been fully restored by a team at Northumbria University and have been placed on loan to the Newcastle City Library, now named the Charles Avison Building, for safe-keeping and preservation. The workbooks are central to the Newcastle Local Collections and feature as part of the Library's recent Turning the Pages project.

== Performance activities ==
The Avison Ensemble performs on period instruments in order to recreate as closely as possible the distinctive sound-world of the late 18th century.

Consisting of some of Europe's leading baroque musicians and soloists the Ensemble is led by Pavlo Beznosiuk, one of the UK's leading period instrument virtuoso violinist and leader of the Academy of Ancient Music. Members of the Ensemble appear regularly in principal positions with the Academy of Ancient Music, Fretwork (music group), The Gabrielli Consort, Monteverdi Choir, Orchestre Révolutionnaire et Romantique, and the English Baroque Soloists, the Amsterdam Baroque Orchestra, English Concert, The King's Consort, and Les Arts Florissants.

The Ensemble has also performed under the conductors Benjamin Zander and Nicholas Kraemer, and with soloists such as the cellists Anner Bylsma, Jaap ter Linden, and Pieter Wispelwey, pianists Ronald Brautigam and Alexei Lubimov, and singers James Bowman, Robin Blaze and Catherine Bott.

The Ensemble is committed to North East England and to bringing Avison's music to its audiences. The Ensemble plays regularly in Newcastle's Assembly Rooms, St. Nicholas Anglican Cathedral, St. Mary's Roman Catholic Cathedral, Brunswick Methodist Church Newcastle, Durham Cathedral, Hexham Abbey, The Guildhall Berwick-upon-Tweed, the Bowes Museum, The Alnwick Playhouse, St Nicholas’ Church Guisborough, Morpeth, and Chillingham Castle. The Ensemble will be appearing at the Sage Gateshead for the first time in October 2015.

In addition to numerous appearances in the other English regions – most recently at St George's Church, Brandon Hill, Bristol – the Ensemble has also appeared at St John's, Smith Square, London, the Foundling Museum, London (in conjunction with the Handel House Museum), at Trinity College of Music in the Chapel of the Old Royal Naval College, Greenwich, as part of the Greenwich Early Music Festival, and at the Handel Festival, Halle, in Germany. The Ensemble has performed twice at St. James's Palace, London with the choir of Her Majesty the Queen's Chapel Royal, and were the largest orchestra in the opening series at the new London concert hall, Kings Place, performing an all Beethoven programme on period instruments which included the Triple Concerto. In 2012 the Ensemble's activities included performances at St James's Church, Piccadilly and St. Nicholas Anglican Cathedral, and the Ensemble returned to Kings Place to present a two-day festival of Arcangelo Corelli's music. In 2015 the Ensemble made its sell-out debut at the Sage Gateshead.

For two years the Ensemble broadcast live concerts on BBC Radio 3 as part of their ‘Live from the 18th century’ series. The Ensemble spearheaded the extensive programme of events in 2009 celebrating the 300th anniversary of Avison's birth.

== Recordings ==
The Avison Ensemble has recorded the complete works of Charles Avison on both the Naxos Records and Divine Art labels, and amongst other recordings the six Cello Concertos by John Garth with Divine Art. Apart from the Avison/Scarlatti Concerti Grossi recording these have all been world premiere recordings. The Ensemble has recorded Handel's Concerti Grossi Opus 6 and Vivaldi's Violin Concerti Opus 8 including 'The Four Seasons' with Linn Records. In October 2012 the Ensemble released its recording of Arcangelo Corelli's Concerti Grossi Opus 6 on Linn Records, the first in its recording series of Corelli's complete works to commemorate the 300th anniversary in 2013 of the composer's death. The fourth and final recording in this series was released in April 2014. The Ensemble's recordings feature regularly on BBC Radio 3 and Classic FM (UK) playlists.

- Charles Avison, Twelve Concertos Op. 6, Naxos (2004)
- Charles Avison, Six Concertos Op. 3 and Eight Concertos Op. 4, Naxos (2006)
- Charles Avison, Twelve Concerti Grossi after Geminiani, Divine Art (2007)
- Charles Avison, 12 Concerti Grossi after Scarlatti, Divine Art (2008)
- Charles Avison, Twelve Concerti Grossi Op. 9 and Six Concerti Grossi Op. 10, Divine Art (2008)
- Charles Avison, Trio Sonatas Op. 1 and Keyboard Sonatas Op. 8, Divine Art (2009)
- Charles Avison, Sonatas for Harpsichord Opp. 5 and 7 (with harpsichordist Gary Cooper), Divine Art (2010)
- Rebellion! Music of the Jacobite Rebellions by Handel, Geminiani and Avison
- Concertos from the North: Concertos by Charles Avison, John Garth and William Herschel
- John Garth, Six Cello Concertos, Divine Art (2007)
- John Garth, Accompanied Keyboard Sonatas Opp. 2 and 4 (with harpsichordist Gary Cooper), Divine Art (2014)
- George Frideric Handel, Concerti Grossi Opus 6, Linn Records (2010)
- Antonio Vivaldi, Violin Concerti Opus 8 Il cimento dell'armonia e dell'inventione (The Contest Between Harmony and Invention) including 'The Four Seasons', Linn Records (2011)
- Arcangelo Corelli, Concerti Grossi Opus 6, Linn Records (2012)
- Arcangelo Corelli, Violin Sonatas Opus 5, Linn Records (2013)
- Arcangelo Corelli, Chamber Sonatas Opus 2 and 4, Linn Records (2013)
- Arcangelo Corelli, Church Sonatas Opus 1 and 3, Linn Records (2014)

== Education and outreach activities ==
At the core of the Avison Ensemble's activities is the strong programme of educational events including an established partnership developed with Gateshead Youth Orchestra and an annual project with North East schools. An international music partnership has been established with the New England Conservatory of Music, Boston, USA.

In August 2012 the Ensemble welcomed Benjamin Zander to present a series of music workshops in Newcastle for amateur and professional musicians and also listeners which explored music interpretation and performance.

The Ensemble develops concerts in partnership with the University of Newcastle upon Tyne and enjoys a partnership with the North East Centre for Lifelong Learning (delivered by the University of Sunderland).

The Ensemble also offers a training ground for young professional musicians to gain experience of period performance practice and styles, affording them the opportunity to work with outstanding directors and soloists.

The annual Avison Ensemble Young Musicians' Awards were set up in 2005 to encourage young musical talent across the North East region. The entrants to the Awards receive tuition and guidance, as well as important encouragement to continue their musical education. The winners of the three Grade categories and small ensemble category are presented with engraved glass trophies created by the North East glass artist Dominic Fonde which are inscribed with music from the Avison workbooks and are displayed in the winners' schools for a year.
