= Mathieu Duguay =

Mathieu Duguay CM ONB
- Born: 1937 (age 88–89); Lamèque, New Brunswick, Canada
- Occupations: Musician, teacher, administrator
- Known for: Founder and longtime artistic director of the Lamèque International Festival of Baroque Music
- Awards: Order of Canada (1994); Order of New Brunswick (2003)

Mathieu Duguay CM ONB is a Canadian musician and teacher from New Brunswick. He founded the Lamèque International Festival of Baroque Music in 1976 and served as its artistic director until 2000.

== Education and early life ==
Duguay was born in Lamèque in 1937. He started taking piano lessons at the age of nine and at the age of ten he began playing the organ for church services. After attending the Collège de Bathurst and the New Brunswick Teachers' College, he taught school for two years before beginning studies at the École de musique Vincent-d'Indy in Montreal, where he studied organ, piano and harpsichord performance. He also studied at the Conservatoire de musique du Québec à Montréal. After finishing his studies, Duguay taught and performed in Montreal and in Toronto, where he lived from 1972 to 1974. He played harpsichord, the instrument in which he specialized, with the New Chamber Orchestra. In 1975 Dugay returned to live in Lamèque.

== The Lamèque International Baroque Music Festival ==
In the summer of 1976 Duguay organized a festival of baroque music at the Sainte-Cécile Church in the community of Petite-Rivière-de-l'Île on Lamèque Island, where he had presented a harpsichord recital in 1971 and had been impressed by the "exceptional acoustics". At the first festival Duguay and flautist François Codère performed J.S. Bach's complete sonatas for flute and harpsichord and gave master classes. The festival grew to be "acknowledged as one of the most important celebrations of its kind, attracting not only widely recognized early music specialists as performers and teachers, but also audiences from across Canada, the U.S. and Europe". Duguay was the festival's artistic director from its inception until the flutist Claire Guimond succeeded him in 2001.

== Honours ==
- Lieutenant-Governor's Excellence Award for community cultural development (1993)
- Honorary doctorate in Music, Université de Moncton (1993)
- Member of the Order of Canada (1994)
- Chevalier of the Order of La Pléiade (2000)
- Member of the Order of New Brunswick (2003)
- Honorary Doctor of Letters, University of New Brunswick (2012)
