= Gary Cooper (musician) =

English conductor and keyboardist (born 1968)

Gary Cooper (born 1968, London) is an English conductor and classical keyboardist who specialises in the harpsichord and fortepiano. He is known as an interpreter of the keyboard music of Bach and Mozart, and as a conductor of historically informed performances of music from the Renaissance, Baroque, Classical and Romantic periods.

== Career ==
Gary Cooper studied organ and harpsichord at Chetham's School of Music, the John Loosemore Centre, and was an organ scholar at New College, Oxford, where he graduated with First Class Honours. In 1990, while still a student at Oxford, he co-founded New Chamber Opera, and has conducted many of their performances, including a complete recording of Rameau's cantatas and a new production of Handel's rarely performed opera, Orlando, at Sadler's Wells Theatre in 2006. Between 1992 and 2000, he was a member of the baroque ensemble, Trio Sonnerie, with whom he performed regularly throughout Europe and the United States.

Cooper made his Wigmore Hall solo recital debut on 1 December 2000 with a performance of Bach's complete Well-Tempered Clavier, and has frequently appeared as a recitalist both in the UK and in Europe. Several of his performances have been broadcast on BBC Radio 3, including his 22 November 2004 recital at the Cosmo Rodewald Concert Hall in Manchester and his 29 January 2006 Wigmore Hall performance of Mozart's sonatas for piano and violin with violinist Rachel Podger, broadcast live as part of the European Broadcasting Union's Mozart Day.

Gary Cooper has conducted for many ensembles including, the Akademie für Alte Musik Berlin, Irish Baroque Orchestra, Hanover Band, and English Touring Opera (Mozart's Die Entführung aus dem Serail and Handel's Alcina). He also teaches harpsichord and fortepiano at the Royal Welsh College of Music and Drama and the Birmingham Conservatoire, and is Visiting Professor of fortepiano at the Royal College of Music.

== Selected recordings ==
- Haydn: Late Piano Works (Sonata in C, Hob, xvi:48), Sonata in Eb, Hob, xvi:49, and Sonata in Eb, Hob.xvi:52) – Gary Cooper (fortepiano). Label: Channel Classics
- Haydn: Symphonies 41, 44, and 49 – Arion Baroque Orchestra, Gary Cooper (conductor). Label: Early-Music
- Rameau: Complete Cantatas – New Chamber Opera, Gary Cooper (conductor). Label: 2 CD Gaudeamus 1999
- Charpentier: Andromède H.504, Le Ballet de Polieucte H.498 – Giles Underwood, bass, James Gilchrist, tenor, Thomas Guthrie, baritone, Rachel Elliott, soprano, The Band of Instruments, Chorus, New Chamber Opera, Gary Cooper (conductor). Label: Gaudeamus 2002
- Charpentier: Le Mariage forcé H.494, Les Fous divertissants H.500 – John Bernays, bass, Nicolas Hurndall Smith, tenor, Rachel Elliott, soprano, Christoph Wittmann, countertenor, The Band of Instruments, Chorus, New Chamber Opera, Gary Cooper (conductor). Label: ASV Gaudeamus 1997
- Mozart: Complete Sonatas for Keyboard & Violin – Gary Cooper (fortepiano), Rachel Podger (violin). Label: Channel Classics (in 8 volumes).
- Weelkes: Anthems – Oxford Camerata – Jeremy Summerly (conductor), Gary Cooper (organ). Label: Naxos
- Shakespeare's Musick – Gary Cooper (virginal), Gary Cooper (harpsichord), Jacob Heringman (lute), Jeanette Ager (mezzo-soprano). Label: Philips Classics
- Victoria: Requiem – Gary Cooper (organ), Keith McGowan (bajan), The Sixteen. Label: Coro
- Charles Avison: Sonatas for Harpsichord Opp. 5 and 7 – The Avison Ensemble, Gary Cooper (harpsichord). Label: Divine Art
- John Garth: Accompanied Keyboard Sonatas Opp. 2 and 4 – The Avison Ensemble, Gary Cooper (harpsichord, spinet, square piano & organ). Label: Divine Art

== Notes and references ==
- BBC Radio 3, A Bach Christmas, broadcast 19 December 2004.
- BBC Radio 3, European Broadcast Union Mozart Day, broadcast 29 January 2006.
- Beaucage, Réjean, "Tempête et passion", Voir Montréal, 20 November 2008. Accessed 8 May 2009.
- Crankshaw, Geoffrey (1 March 2001). "Gary Cooper at the Wigmore Hall". Musical Opinion. Archived from the original on 25 October 2012 – via HighBeam Research.
- Fairclough, Pauline, "Harpsichordfest", The Guardian, 30 March 2004. Accessed 8 May 2009.
- GoldbergWeb, "Ever present at New Chamber Opera events is the Company's founding conductor, Gary Cooper" (profile). Accessed 8 May 2009.
- Griffiths, Paul, Paying Court to a Wry Master of the French Baroque (review of Cantatas. New Chamber Opera Ensemble, conducted by Gary Cooper), New York Times, 7 April 2000. Accessed 8 May 2009.
- Holden, Anthony, "Kindly get that mirror off the stage", The Observer, 25 March 2007. Accessed 8 May 2009.
- Monk, Christopher (January 2007). "Independent Opera's Orlando at Sadler's Wells". Musical Opinion. Vol. 130, no. 1456. Archived from the original on 28 December 2015 – via Questia.
- Picard, Anna, "Review: Gary Cooper, Christchurch Spitalfields, London", The Independent, 30 June 2002. Accessed 8 May 2009.
- Strini, Tom (22 March 1997). "Trio, flutist add life to Bach logic – Composer keeps them busy, but not too busy to have fun". Milwaukee Journal Sentinel.
- Swed, Mark, "The sonata, unplugged: Performing Mozart's works for violin and fortepiano on, well, the violin and fortepiano restores harmony and the costar billing the composer intended", Los Angeles Times, 9 October 2005, p. E42. Accessed 8 May 2009.
- Thicknesse, Robert "Opera review: Alcina", The Times, 18 October 2005. Accessed 8 May 2009.
