= Emeline Pierre (writer) =

French Afro-Caribbean writer

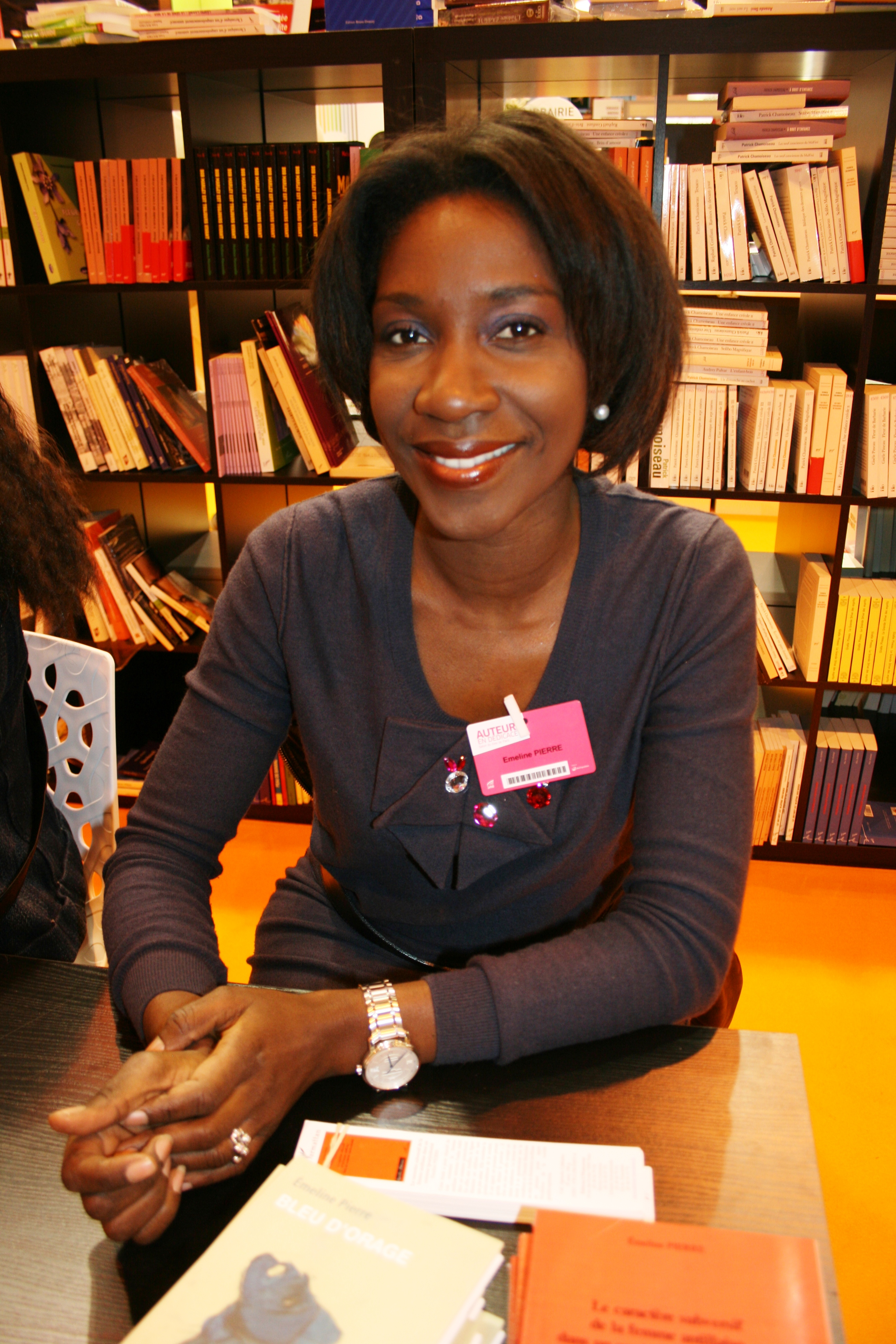
Pierre in 2011

Émeline Pierre (born 1980) is a Guadeloupean writer of Haitain and Dominican descent. She is an assistant professor of literature at the University of Montreal. She is the author of the short story collection "Bleu d'orage" ["Stormy Blue"] and the book "Le polar de la Caraïbe francophone" ["Crime novels of the French-speaking Caribbean"].

== Early life and education ==
Pierre was born in Guadeloupe on July 14, 1980, in Les Abymes. Her father was Haitian and her mother, Dominican.

She obtained a diplôme d'études approfondies from the University of Quebec at Montreal. She received her Ph.D in French literature from the University of Montreal in 2016.

== Career ==
In 2008, she published the essay, "The Subversive Character of the Antique Woman in a (Post)Colonial Context", on the situation of women in the Caribbean, drawing on her master's thesis.

This was followed in 2010 by the short story collection "Bleu d'orage", which included the short story Rencontre Fortuite. In 2013, she released the children's book "Les Découvertes de Papille au Bénin" ["Papille's Adventures in Benin"]. This was followed in 2024 by her book "Le polar de la Caraïbe francophone" ["The crime novel in the French-speaking Caribbean"]. Her work has also appeared in several anthologies.

She is a member of the Parliament of Francophone Women Writers (Le Parlement des écrivaines francophones). She has also served on juries for the Conseil des arts et des lettres du Québec (Council of Arts and Letters of Quebec) and the Council of Arts of Canada.

Pierre is an assistant professor of French literature at the Université de Montreal.

== Critical reception ==
In Julie Assier's review of Pierre's "The Subversive Character of the Antique Woman in a (Post)Colonial Context" (2008), which compared two novels by two female authors, Assier found that the publication "while ultimately for researchers, was still accessible to the general public, inviting them to question the condition of women in Guadeloupian literature and society".

Of her short story collection, "Bleu d'orage", Le Devoir said they tell the stories of "new Caribbean heroes" who much like Pierre herself "live on the border between two countries, two or three languages, and diverse cultural traditions". The journal Lettres Québécoises said Pierre intelligently 'left questions of morality to the reader'.

Miriam Gordon reviewed Pierre's Le polar de la Caraïbe francophone for the Bulletin of Francophone Postcolonial Studies. She considered the "greatest strength of this monograph... the wide geographical breadth of the corpus" and stated that "the literary analysis [is] very strong, and the commentaries ... offer some in-depth analysis of the societies depicted... the Caribbean polar debunks the perception of the region as a sunny paradise". In Gordon's view, the book "provides fertile ground for scholars who wish to delve deeper into questions of gender, violence and how le polar interacts with Francophone Caribbean literature as a whole".

== Awards ==
For her book, "Les Découvertes de Papille au Bénin (2013) ["Papille's Adventures in Benin"], Pierre won a writing competition held by the publisher Editions de Septembre.

== Publications ==
=== Books ===
- Pierre, Emeline. Le polar de la Caraïbe francophone [The crime novel of the French-speaking Caribbean]. University of Montréal Press. 2024 ISBN 978-2-7606-4988-0
- Pierre, Emeline. "Les Découvertes de Papille au Bénin" ["Papille's Discoveries in Benin"]. September Canad. 2013. ISBN 978-2-89471-445-4.
- Pierre, Emeline. "Bleu d'orage" ["Stormy Blue]". Pleine Lune. 2010. ISBN 978-2-89024-199-2
- Pierre, Emeline. "The Subversive Character of the Antique Woman in a (Post)Colonial Context". Harmattan. Paris. 2008. ISBN 978-2-296-05851-4

=== Anthologies ===
- Pierre, Emeline. "La francophonie comme espace de polyphonie: vers un éclatement des centers." In La francophonie au féminin: un espace à inventer, edited by Fawzia Zouari and Lise Gauvin. Montréal: Mémoire d'encrier, 2024. ISBN 978-2-89872-016-1.
- Pierre, Emeline. Martinique. 2021. ISBN 978-2-36430-053-8
- Pierre, Emeline. "Confinement avec soi," "Slow time, slow food," and "La vie en vert." Chroniques du confinement. Parlement des écrivaines francophones, 2020.
- Pierre, Emeline. "La leçon" ["The Lesson]. In Voix d'écrivaines francophones: Anthologie, edited by Fawzia Zouari. Regain de lecture, 2019. ISBN 978-2-35391-052-6.
- Pierre, Emeline. "Gourmandise" ["Gluttony"]. In Chroniques des Îles du vent: Guadeloupe & Martinique, edited by Dominique Ranaivoson and Jean-Marc Rosier. Paris: Sépia, 2018. ISBN 979-10-334-0141-4.

=== Articles ===
- Pierre, Emeline. "Exposition: Van Gogh s'invite à Ottawa". Le Devoir. Montreal. Nov 16, 2011. p. B11.
- Pierre, Emeline. "Yolande Racine quitte la Cinémathèque Québécoise"". Le Devoir. Montreal. Nov 16, 2011. p. B11.
- Pierre, Emeline. "En Bref: Polisse Couronne à Cinemania". Le Devoir. Montreal. Nov 16, 2011. p. B10.
- Pierre, Emeline. "Les contes d'Ida Faubert à l'épreuve de la violence." Études françaises 60, no. 2 (2024): 27–42. https://doi.org/10.7202/1118192ar.
