= Suzie LeBlanc =

Canadian opera singer

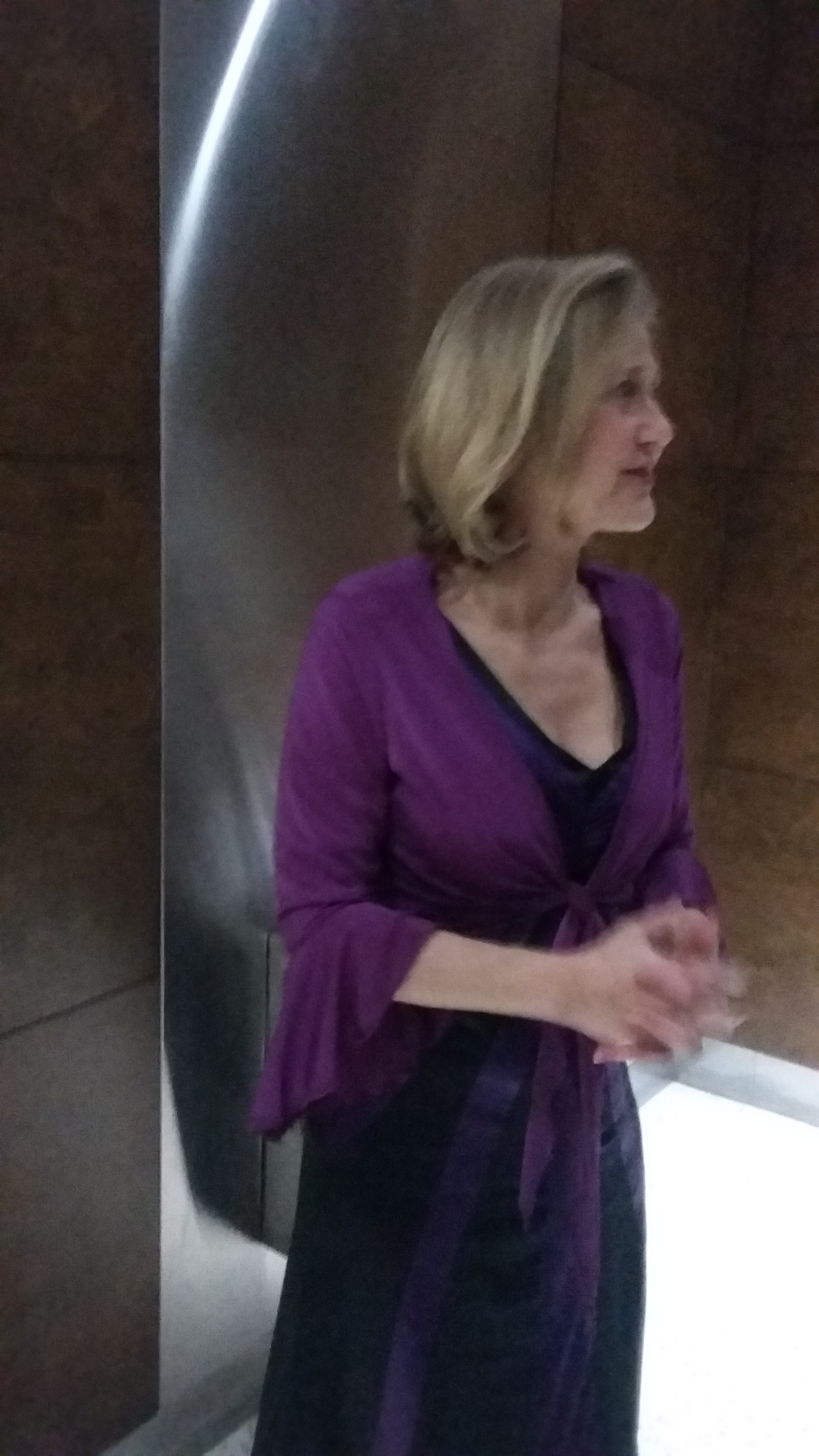
Suzie LeBlanc

Suzie LeBlanc CM (born 27 October 1961) is a Canadian soprano and early music specialist. She taught at McGill University from 2016 to 2020 and became the Artistic and Executive Director of Early Music Vancouver in 2021. She was named a member of the Order of Canada in 2014 for her contributions to music and Acadian culture.

== Early life and education ==
Suzie LeBlanc was born into an Acadian family in Edmundston, New Brunswick. Her mother, Marie-Germaine Leblanc, was an operatic soprano and singing teacher. As a child LeBlanc played the piano and flute, and was a member of the youth choir Les Jeunes Chanteurs d'Acadie. In 1976 LeBlanc moved with her family to Montreal, where she was first exposed to baroque music at a concert of the Studio de musique ancienne de Montréal and experienced what she later called "love at first sight" for the music. From 1979 to 1981 she studied harpsichord and voice at the Cégep de Saint-Laurent, with harpsichord as her major subject.

== Career ==
=== As a singer ===
LeBlanc specializes in the 17th and 18th century repertoire. She began singing professionally with the New World Consort of Vancouver. In a review of a 1987 New World Consort recital of early music in Spanish, French, English, and Italian, the New York Times music critic Bernard Holland described her voice as "a musically communicative, purely tuned soprano − and one that enunciated crisply in all four languages." Feeling the need to improve her vocal technique after three years of "education on stage", she went to study in Europe, where Anthony Rooley soon invited her to join his early music group The Consort of Musicke, replacing soprano Emma Kirkby for eight months. She later recorded two albums with the Consort of Musicke.

She has often worked with the American lutenist and music director Stephen Stubbs, recording numerous albums with his early music group Tragicomedia. She has sung and recorded with the Purcell Quartet, the Parley of Instruments, Red Byrd, Les Voix Humaines, Tafelmusik Baroque Orchestra, Amsterdam Baroque Orchestra, Musica Antiqua Köln, Australian Brandenburg Orchestra, and Les Violons du Roy, among others. LeBlanc frequently performs and records with countertenor Daniel Taylor.

Her opera roles include Poppea in L'incoronazione di Poppea at the Opéra de Montréal with Daniel Taylor, Clori in Handel’s Clori, Tirsi e Fileno, and Euridice in Monteverdi’s Orfeo. She was a soloist in Jonathan Miller's 2006 staging of Bach's St Matthew Passion at the Brooklyn Academy of Music.

LeBlanc performs and records music from periods and genres other than early music. Her 2008 recording of Messiaen songs won the Conseil Québecois de la musique's Opus award for best contemporary music recording. She has recorded two albums of Acadian folksongs, La mer jolie (2004) and Tout passe (2007). In 2014 she released La Veillée de Noël, an album of old French Christmas songs. The little-known noëls were taken from Rondes et chansons populaires illustrées, a volume published in Paris in the late nineteenth century and discovered by LeBlanc's cousin at the Collège St-Joseph in Memramcook, New Brunswick.

LeBlanc commissioned settings of several of Elizabeth Bishop's poems from four Canadian composers: Christos Hatzis, John Plant, Alasdair MacLean, and Emily Doolittle. The songs were first performed during the 2011 Elizabeth Bishop Centenary in Nova Scotia. LeBlanc used crowdfunding to finance the songs' recording. The resulting album, I am in need of music, in which LeBlanc is accompanied by a chamber orchestra conducted by Dinuk Wijeratne, contains settings of eleven Bishop poems. Released in 2013, it has been called "an eloquent testament to love, devotion and determination". The recording was a finalist for the 2014 Lieutenant Governor of Nova Scotia Masterworks Arts Award. It won the 2014 East Coast Music Award for best classical album. LeBlanc currently teaches at McGill University.

=== Other activities ===
In 2000 she founded Le nouvel Opéra, which is now directed by Rona Nadler.

As an actress, LeBlanc played the leading female character in the feature film Lost Song, which won the Toronto International Film Festival Award for Best Canadian Film in 2008.

LeBlanc was introduced to the poetry of Elizabeth Bishop in 2007, when visiting Bishop's childhood home of Great Village, Nova Scotia. Fascinated by Bishop's life and work, LeBlanc collaborated with the Nova Scotian poet Sandra Barry to organize the Elizabeth Bishop Centenary Festival in Nova Scotia in 2011. She is the honorary patron of the Elizabeth Bishop Society of Nova Scotia.

She was appointed Artistic and Executive Director of Early Music Vancouver in 2021.

== Honours ==
LeBlanc has been awarded honorary doctoral degrees by Mount Allison University, Mount Saint Vincent University, the University of King's College, and the Université de Moncton. In 2010 the Québec Arts Council awarded her a Career Grant. In 2014 she was made a Member of the Order of Canada for "contributing to the development of early-period music and Acadian culture as a singer and teacher".

== Discography ==
- Au Verd Boys/To the Greenwood (Collegium Records, 1985) – with the New World Consort
- Vivaldi: Magnificat (Hyperion, 1987) – with Tafelmusik
- Campra: Musique en Nouvelle-France (REM Editions, 1989)
- De Wert: Madrigali (Virgin, 1989) – with The Consort of Musicke
- Monteverdi: L'ottavo libro de madrigali ( Virgin, 1990) – with The Consort of Musicke
- New Fashions: Cries and ballads of London (CRD Records, 1992) – with Red Byrd
- Codex Las Huelgas (Harmonia Mundi, 1992) – with Sequentia
- Musik am Prager Hof Kaiser Rudolfs II (Harmonia Mundi, 1992) – with Dialogo Musicale
- Music from the Age of Discovery (CBC Records, 1992) – with the New World Consort
- Luzzaschi: The Secret Music of Luzzasco Luzzaschi (Amon Ra, 1992) – with Musica Secreta
- Monteverdi: Il ballo delle ingrate (Teldec, 1992) – with Tragicomedia
- Luigi Rossi: Le Canterine Romane (Teldec, 1992) – with Tragicomedia
- John Blow: Awake my lyre(Hyperion, 1993) – with The Parley of Instruments
- Antonio Draghi, John Blow: Odes to Saint Cecilia (Hyperion, 1994) – with The Parley of Instruments
- Barbara Strozzi: La Virtuosissima Cantatrice (Amon Ra, 1994) – with Musica Secreta
- Purcell: Hark How the Wild Musicians Sing (Hyperion, 1995) – with The Parley of Instruments
- Schütz: Symphoniae Sacrae (Chandos, 1995) – with the Purcell Quartet
- Purcell: Songs of Welcome and Farewell (Teldec, 1995) – with Tragicomedia
- Vanitas Vanitatum: Rome 1650 (Teldec, 1995) – with Tragicomedia
- Bononcini: Amore Doppio (NCA, 1996) – with Lautten Compagney
- Moulinié: Airs de cour, premier livre (CBC Records, 1996) – with Stephen Stubbs
- Virgilio Mazzocchi: Lagrime amare (Teldec, 1996) – with Tragicomedia
- Ivan Moody: Passion and Resurrection (Hyperion, 1997) – with Red Byrd and Capella Amsterdam
- Handel: Clori, Tirsi e Fileno (NCA, 1997) – with Lautten Compagney
- Love and Death in Venice (Virgin Veritas, 1997) – with Derek Lee Ragin and Teatro Lirico
- The Spirite of Musicke: Music for voice and two viols (Atma, 1998) – with Les Voix Humaines
- Amor Roma, cantates romaines circa 1640 (Challenge Classics, 2000) – with Tragicomedia
- Bach: Coffee Cantata and Peasant Cantata (Analekta, 2001) – with Tafelmusik
- Star of the Magi (Atma, 2001) – with Les Voix Humaines, Daniel Taylor, prix Opus 2002
- Handel, Bach, Vivaldi: Gloria (Atma, 2001) – with Académie baroque de Montréal
- Amour cruel (Atma, 2001) – with Les Voix Humaines and Stephen Stubbs - Prix Opus 2000: disque de l'année.
- Sartorio: L’Orfeo (Challenge Classics, 2001) – with Teatro Lirico
- Vivaldi (Challenge Classics, 2001) – with Teatro Lirico
- Handel: Love Duets (Atma, 2002) – with Arion ensemble, Daniel Taylor, Stephen Stubbs
- Bach: Cantatas 131, 152, 161 (Atma, 2002) – with Theatre of Early Music
- ¡Ay que si! (Atma, 2002) – with Les Voix Humaines
- Handel: Acis and Galatea (Atma, 2003) – with Les Boréades
- Buxtehude: Sacred Cantatas. (Chandos, 2003) – with Purcell Quartet, Emma Kirkby, Peter Harvey
- Monteverdi: Vespro della Beata Vergine (Atma, 2003) – with Concerto Palatino, Tragicomedia
- Actus Tragicus (Atma, 2003) – with Theatre of Early Music
- Chants d'Acadie: La mer jolie (Atma, 2004)
- Primavera (Atma, 2004) – with Les Voix Humaines and Daniel Taylor
- Bach: Cantates Saint-Jean-Baptiste : No. 30; No. 7; No. 167 (Atma, 2005) – with Montreal Baroque Orchestra
- Gluck Orphée et Eurydice (Naxos, 2005) – with Opera Lafayette
- Pierre Bouteiller De vanitate mundi (Atma, 2005) – with Les Voix Humaines
- Handel: Suzie Leblanc portrait (Atma, 2006)
- Mozart: Lieder (Atma, 2006) – with Yannick Nézet-Séguin
- Buxtehude: Membra Jesu Nostri (Atma, 2007) – with Les Voix Baroques
- Jean-Baptiste Lully: Thésée (CPO, 2007) – with the Boston Early Music Festival orchestra and chorus
- Chants d’Acadie: Tout passe (Atma Classics, 2007)
- Messiaen Chants de terre et de ciel (Atma, 2008) – with Robert Kortgaard, Laura Andriano, Lawrence Wiliford
- Carissimi: Oratorios (Atma, 2010) – with Les Voix Baroques
- Caldara: La Conversione di Clodoveo, Re di Francia (Atma, 2011) – with Le Nouvel Opera
- Nobil Donna, Music at the Barberini Palace (Atma, 2011)
- I Am in Need of Music (Centrediscs, 2013)
- La Veillée de Noël (Atma, 2014)
