= Lamèque International Festival of Baroque Music =

Canadian music festival

Lamèque International Festival of Baroque Music / Festival international de musique baroque de Lamèque
- Status: active
- Frequency: Annual
- Location: Lamèque Island
- Inaugurated: 1976
- Founder: Mathieu Duguay
- Website: www.festivalbaroque.com/en/

The Lamèque International Festival of Baroque Music (French: Festival international de musique baroque de Lamèque), is an annual summer music festival held on Lamèque Island, New Brunswick, Canada. It was founded in 1976 by harpsichordist Mathieu Duguay, who served as the festival's artistic director until 2000.

At the first festival Duguay and flutist François Codère performed J.S. Bach's complete sonatas for flute and harpsichord and gave master classes. The concerts took place in the Sainte-Cécile Church in the small community of Petite-Rivière-de-l'Île on Lamèque Island. The church continues to be the festival's main performance venue. By the 1990s the festival was "acknowledged as one of the most important celebrations of its kind, attracting not only widely recognized early music specialists as performers and teachers, but also audiences from across Canada, the U.S. and Europe."

In 1985 Duguay founded the Mission St-Charles Choir, whose name comes from the historic Jesuit mission on nearby Miscou Island. The choir, made up of choir members from local parishes, was originally formed to perform with an orchestra at a Bach concert.

Among the artists who have performed at the festival are Marion Verbruggen, Scott Ross, Colin Tilney, Malcolm Bilson, Andrew Parrott, Suzie LeBlanc and Musica Antiqua Köln.

After Duguay's retirement the flutist Claire Guimond served as artistic director from 2001 to 2006. Duguay returned as interim artistic director for the 2007 festival. The bassoonist Mathieu Lussier became artistic director in 2008 and was succeeded in 2015 by the recorder player Vincent Lauzer.
