= Indianapolis Baroque Orchestra =

Baroque orchestra in Indianapolis, Indiana, US

The Indianapolis Baroque Orchestra is a Baroque orchestra dedicated to performing music of the 17th and 18th centuries using period instruments and historically informed performance practices to enrich, educate, and inspire the Indiana community and beyond. The orchestra's artistic director is the Belgian Baroque flutist and conductor, Barthold Kuijken.

== History ==
Established in 1997 under the umbrella of IndyBaroque Music, Inc., the Indianapolis Baroque Orchestra performs season concerts at the Indiana History Center and the University of Indianapolis, where the Indianapolis Baroque Orchestra has been ensemble-in-residence since 1999. The members of the group perform on instruments built between about 1600 and 1750, or replicas thereof, including instruments not in common use today, such as the theorbo, the violone, the sackbut, wooden one-keyed flutes, valveless trumpets, and the harpsichord.

== Recordings ==
The Indianapolis Baroque Orchestra has released four CD recordings on the Naxos label with the conductor Barthold Kuijken: The Lully Effect (Naxos, 2018), The Versailles Revolution (Naxos, 2018), The Colourful Telemann (Naxos, 2020) and The Grand Mogul (Naxos, 2019). Their recordings have attracted international attention and praise.

== Collaborations ==
The Indianapolis Baroque Orchestra partners with the Indianapolis Early Music Festival in the quadrennial Indianapolis International Baroque Competition, established in 2016. The orchestra also collaborates with the Indianapolis Symphonic Choir, the Indianapolis Suzuki Academy, and Second Presbyterian's Beecher Singers on an annual Handel Messiah performance. In 2019, the orchestra began performing on the Marianne Tobias Music Program at Eskenazi Health and on a series of Sunday concerts at Newfields, Indianapolis Art Museum.
