= Dinuk Wijeratne =

Canadian conductor and composer

Dinuk Wijeratne /ˈdɪnʊk ˌwɪdʒəˈrʌtnə/ (born 1978) is a conductor, composer and pianist, living and working in Ottawa, Ontario, Canada. His work Two Pop Songs on Antique Poems won both the 2016 Juno Award for Classical Composition of the Year and the 2016 East Coast Music Award for Classical Composition of the Year. His boundary-crossing musical collaborations include ground-breaking combinations of symphony orchestra and tabla, and string quartet and DJ.

== Early life and education ==
Wijeratne was born in Sri Lanka, and grew up in Dubai, UAE. He studied at the Royal Northern College of Music in the UK, and with John Corigliano at Juilliard in New York City. In 2005 his family moved to Nova Scotia.

== Career ==
Wijeratne made his Carnegie Hall debut in 2004 as a conductor, composer and pianist, performing with Yo Yo Ma and the Silk Road Ensemble. He became the music director for the Nova Scotia Youth Orchestra in 2006, and held a 3-year appointment as Conductor-in-Residence with Symphony Nova Scotia.

In 2013 Wijeratne conducted the Elizabeth Bishop Players as they recorded music accompanying soprano Suzie LeBlanc for the album I Am in Need of Music.

In 2016 Wijeratne's composition "Two Pop Songs on Antique Poems", from the Afriara Quartet's album Spin Cycle, won a Juno Award as Classical Composition of the Year.

He was commissioned by the Calgary Philharmonic to compose "First Winter", a movement for its 2017 True North: Symphonic Ballet. The piece combines the work of five composers, and was premiered at the True North Festival in celebration of Canada's 150th birthday. "First Winter" was also performed by the Toronto Symphony Orchestra at the 21C Festival in 2019.

Wijeratne is currently an assistant professor at the University of Ottawa.

== Selected works ==
- Tsimo! (2012)
- Tabla Concerto (2011) The first full-length Tabla Concerto for tabla and full Western classical Symphony Orchestra
- 'Brazil, January 1, 1502' (2011)
- Solea di Diomira (2010)
- Colour Study in Rupaktaal (2007)
- Two Pop Songs on Antique Poems (2015) Winner of both the 2016 Juno Award and the 2016 East Coast Music Award for Classical Composition of the Year
- Polyphonic Lively (2016) Winner of the 2017 Lieutenant Governor of Nova Scotia Masterworks Arts Award
- Clarinet Concerto (2018)
