= Conseil des arts et des lettres du Québec =

Canadian public agency

The Conseil des arts et des lettres du Québec (French pronunciation: [kɔ̃sɛj dez‿aʁ e de lɛtʁ dy kebɛk], CALQ) is a public agency founded in 1994 by the government of Quebec.

CALQ offers support and funding for art projects in the performing arts, multidisciplinary arts, circus arts, visual arts, media arts, architectural research, arts and crafts, and literature. It also seeks to broaden the influence of Quebec culture in Canada and abroad, and supports the advanced training of writers and professional artists.

== Board members ==
As of January 2013, the Conseil's board of directors are:

- Marie DuPont, Chair of the Board of Directors
- Yvan Gauthier, Chief Executive Officer
- Francine Bernier, Vice-president of the Board of Directors, Director General and Artistic Director of Agora de la danse (Montréal)
- Agathe Alie, Assistant Vice-President - Global Citizenship and Public Affairs Director at Cirque du Soleil
- Michel Biron, Author, Full professor in the Department of French Language and Literature at McGill University
- Charles-Mathieu Brunelle, Director general of Espace pour la vie de Montréal
- Alan Côté, Director general and Artistic Director of Village en chanson de Petite-Vallée
- Luc Courchesne, Media artist, Professeur titulaire, École de design industriel, Faculté de l'aménagement of Université de Montréal, Créateur-chercheur associé at Société des arts technologiques
- Luc Gallant, CA, Chartered accountant, Associate Partner - KPMG
- Mona Hakim, Exhibition curator, art critic and instructor in art history
- Jo-Ann Kane, Curator of the collection of the National Bank of Canada, President of the Association des Collections d'entreprises du Québec, Independent curator
- Stéphane Laforest, Artistic Director and Conductor of Orchestre symphonique de Sherbrooke, Executive and Artistic Director and Conductor of Orchestre la Sinfonia de Lanaudière, First assistant conductor of Orchestre Symphonique de Montréal
- Louise Lemieux-Bérubé, Artist and Chief Executive Officer of Centre des textiles contemporains de Montréal
- Dominique Payette, Professor - Département d'information et de communication of Université Laval

== Ordre des arts et des lettres du Québec ==
In 2015, CALQ awarded the inaugural Ordre des arts et des lettres du Québec, honouring achievement in Quebec arts and letters, on the occasion of its 20th anniversary. Thirty-five inductees were added to the order in its first year, including 13 board members. Though inspired by France's Ordre des Arts et des Lettres, the Quebec order differs in that it has only one grade, that of companion.

=== Inductees ===
==== 2015 ====
- David Altmejd
- Denys Arcand
- Godefroy-M. Cardinal
- Melvin Charney
- Marie Chouinard
- Leonard Cohen
- Clémence DesRochers
- Xavier Dolan
- Réjean Ducharme
- Marie-Hélène Falcon
- Liza Frulla
- Jean-Claude Germain
- Oliver Jones
- Marie Laberge
- Dany Laferrière
- Phyllis Lambert
- Ginette Laurin
- Louise Lecavalier
- Michel Lemieux
- Louise Lemieux-Bérubé
- Robert Lepage
- Gilles Maheu
- Jovette Marchessault
- Monique Mercure
- Guy Morin
- Yannick Nézet-Séguin
- Alanis Obomsawin
- Élise Paré-Tousignant
- Fred Pellerin
- Victor Pilon
- Luc Plamondon
- Guy Rodgers
- William St-Hilaire
- Françoise Sullivan
- Michel Tremblay

==== 2016 ====
- Marie-Claire Blais
- Marie Brassard
- Madeleine Careau
- Jacqueline Desmarais
- Jean-Pierre Ferland
- Bernard Labadie
- Guy Laliberté
- Marie-Nicole Lemieux
- Rita Letendre
- Édouard Lock
- Rafael Lozano-Hemmer
- Anna McGarrigle
- André Melançon
- Moshe Safdie
- Gilles Ste-Croix
- Janine Sutto
- Gilles Vigneault
- Denis Villeneuve

==== 2017 ====
- Jacques Brault
- Win Butler and Régine Chassagne (Arcade Fire)
- Michel Dallaire
- René Derouin
- Yvon Deschamps
- Diane Dufresne
- Denise Filiatrault
- Roger Frappier
- Phoebe Greenberg
- Pierre Lassonde
- Kent Nagano
- Lorraine Pintal
- Michel Rabagliati
- Charles Richard-Hamelin
- Florent Vollant
- Vincent Warren
- Kim Yaroshevskaya

==== 2018 ====
- Joséphine Bacon
- Manon Barbeau
- Victor-Lévy Beaulieu
- Nicole Brossard
- Fernand Dansereau
- Angèle Dubeau
- André Gagnon
- Mattiusi Iyaituk
- Roland Lepage
- André Ménard
- Ginette Noiseux
- Jeannot Painchaud
- Constance V. Pathy
- John R. Porter
- Jeanne Renaud
- Alain Simard
- Yves Sioui Durand
- Jana Sterbak
- Armand Vaillancourt
- Jean-Marc Vallée

==== 2019 ====
- Daniela Arendasova
- Michel Marc Bouchard
- Alan Côté
- Céline Dion
- André Dudemaine
- Françoise Faucher
- Serge Fiori
- Paul-André Fortier
- Brigitte Haentjens
- Suzanne Lebeau
- Zab Maboungou
- Nadia Myre
- Alain Paré
- Rodney Saint-Éloi
- Peter Simons
- Pierre Thibault
- Kim Thúy

==== 2021 ====
- Anik Bissonnette
- André Brassard
- Robert Charlebois
- Dena Davida
- Michel de la Chenelière
- Sophie Deraspe
- Louise Déry
- François Girard
- Jacques Godin
- Claire Guimond
- Elisapie Isaac
- Kinya Ishikawa
- Denis Marleau
- Alain Mongeau
- Joseph Nakhlé
- Jacques Primeau
- Jocelyne Saucier
- Gabor Szilasi

==== 2022 ====
- Jan Rok Achard
- Gaston Bellemare
- Eudore Belzile
- Walter Boudreau
- Tivi Etok
- Louise Forestier
- Michel Jean
- André Laliberté
- Dulcinée Langfelder
- Michel Rivard
- Monique Savoie
- Mohamed Lamine Touré

==== 2023 ====
- Paule Baillargeon
- Lucie Boissinot
- Shana Carroll
- René Richard Cyr
- Louis Dallaire
- Michèle Lapointe
- Ranee Lee
- Jacques Matte
- Caroline Monnet
- Guy Parent
- Jocelyn Robert
- Richard Séguin
- Larry Tremblay

==== 2024 ====
- Les Cowboys Fringants
- Hélène Dorion
- Claude Dubois
- André Forcier
- Linda Gaboriau
- Rosie Godbout
- Michel Goulet
- Alice Ming Wai Jim
- Menka Nagrani
- Susie Napper
- Louise Sicuro
- Roland Smith
- William Tagoona

==== 2025 ====
- Daniel Bélanger
- Lorraine Desmarais
- Jacques Fournier
- D. Kimm
- Diane Landry
- Michel Levasseur
- Manuel Mathieu
- Mireille Métellus
- Louis-Karl Picard-Sioui
- Victor Quijada

== See also ==
- Canada Council for the Arts
- Ontario Arts Council
