= Julian Perkins =

British conductor and keyboard player

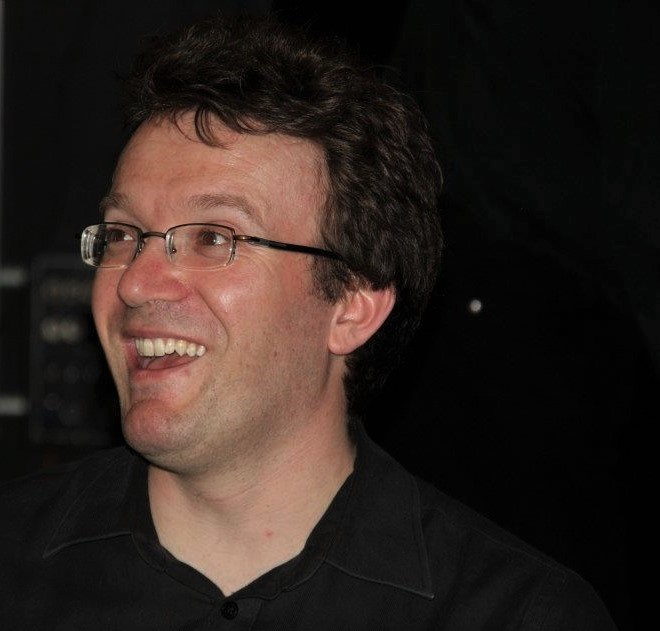
Julian Perkins in rehearsal, 2012

Julian Perkins is a British conductor and keyboard player (harpsichord, fortepiano and clavichord). Shortlisted for the Gramophone Award in 2021, he is Artistic Director of the Portland Baroque Orchestra in the US. He lives in London, England and is also Founder Director of the early music ensemble Sounds Baroque and Artistic Director of Cambridge Handel Opera Company.

As a conductor, Julian Perkins has been praised for his 'heartening dramatic energy' and 'dynamic direction', while his harpsichord playing has been described as 'superbly creative' and 'wonderfully adept and stylish'. He conducted the first professional recording of Eccles's Semele with the Academy of Ancient Music, and the world première recordings of Daniel Purcell's opera-oratorio The Judgment of Paris and Stephen Dodgson's opera Margaret Catchpole. His solo discography includes world premières of virtuosic harpsichord suites by James Nares, John Christopher Smith and John Worgan, clavichord works by Herbert Howells and Stephen Dodgson, Johann Sebastian Bach's French Suites and a clavichord programme entitled Handel's Attick. His numerous ensemble recordings include two discs of Italian cantatas, and one of songs by Henry Purcell featuring the soprano Anna Dennis with Sounds Baroque. Duo recordings comprise Franz Schubert's violin sonatas of 1816 with Peter Sheppard Skærved, a programme entitled Chit Chat with Terence Charlston featuring contemporary works for two clavichords and, with Emma Abbate, Wolfgang Amadeus Mozart's complete sonatas for keyboard duet, Carl Maria von Weber's complete works for keyboard duet and a disc of twentieth-century pieces by English composers.

Julian Perkins has directed groups ranging from the Academy of Ancient Music to the Orchestra of Welsh National Opera, performed concertos with Florilegium, Orchestra of the Age of Enlightenment, Orchestra of The Sixteen and Royal Northern Sinfonia, given numerous chamber performances with ensembles including the Bavarian State Orchestra, Mozarteum Orchestra Salzburg and Trevor Pinnock & Friends, and performed with various prizewinners in the BBC Cardiff Singer of the World competition. He works annually with the Southbank Sinfonia, has conducted staged opera productions for organisations including Bampton Classical Opera, the Buxton Festival, Dutch National Opera Academy, Grimeborn Festival, Guildhall School of Music & Drama, New Chamber Opera and New Kent Opera, and devised an opera pasticcio about Casanova with librettist Stephen Pettitt that he directed for the Baroque Unwrapped series at London's Kings Place in May 2016. He often appears live on BBC Radio 3, has featured several times on The Early Music Show and contributed to the radio station's pioneering podcast about George Frideric Handel's Orlando with Welsh National Opera. Since 2014, Julian Perkins has been the Artistic Director of Coram's Handel Birthday Concert, that raises money for vulnerable children. He has given solo recitals in international festivals at St Albans, Buxton, Canterbury, Deal, King's Lynn, Lammermuir, Lichfield, Northern Aldborough, Oundle, Petworth, Roman River, Ryedale, Swaledale, Two Moors and Tel Aviv. Active as a teacher, he is a harpsichord tutor at the Royal Northern College of Music. He has also written articles for publications such as BBC Music Magazine, Early Music and Early Music Today, and contributed to The Cambridge Encyclopedia of Historical Performance in Music.
