= Atlanta Baroque Orchestra =

US orchestra

- Short name: ABO
- Founded: 1997
- Music director: Julie Andrijeski (2011–present)
- Website: atlantabaroque.org

The Atlanta Baroque Orchestra (ABO), founded in 1997 in Atlanta, Georgia, is the first and oldest professional orchestra in the Southeastern United States of America dedicated to historically informed performance, (also called "authentic performance practice") of music from the Baroque era on period instruments. The Atlanta Baroque Orchestra gave its premiere concert in January, 1998. The first director of the ABO was lute and theorbo player Lyle Nordstrom, who departed in 2003. John Hsu, noted performer on the viola da gamba and baryton, took the title of artistic advisor, becoming artistic director in July 2004; he continued through the 2008/2009 season. From 2004 through 2011, the resident director was founding member Daniel Pyle, harpsichordist and organist, instructor of music at Clayton State University, and organist and choir director at the Anglican Church of Our Saviour in Atlanta. Violinist, Baroque dancer and choreographer Julie Andrijeski became artistic director in February, 2011.

The ABO usually performs four to six concerts per year, concentrating on orchestral works and concerti, but often featuring chamber pieces, vocal cantatas, and other works with vocal soloists. The range of works performed by the ABO stretches back to the beginnings of Baroque style around the year 1600, while their core repertoire is centered in music from many composers who worked in the Middle Baroque era of Pachelbel and Corelli (the late 1600s) and the High Baroque era of Vivaldi, Bach, Handel and Telemann (up through 1750). They have also performed the music of Mozart and Haydn, and the string symphonies of Mendelssohn from the 1820s. Several concerts have featured the orchestra accompanying Baroque dancers.

Because a relatively small number of musicians specialize in playing Baroque-era instruments, the ABO consists of a small core of musicians who live in the Atlanta area, supplemented by guest performers and featured soloists from throughout the US and overseas. Most performers with the ABO are university instructors and professors with advanced degrees; all are specialists in authentic performance practice, playing replicas of the actual instruments used in the Baroque era. Such an ensemble produces a sound that is quite different from ensembles which use modern orchestral instruments. Baroque violins, violas and cellos use strings of sheep gut and bows of an earlier design, rather than the louder string instruments strung with steel strings played by conventional orchestras. Likewise, the Baroque flute is made of wood and does not have keys, while the Baroque horn (often called the natural horn) has no valves. Other instruments featured in a Baroque orchestra include the harpsichord and lautenwerk, viola da gamba and bass viol, recorder, Baroque bassoon, lute and theorbo.

Guest artists and directors have included leading Baroque and Classical-period performers: violinists Stanley Ritchie, Monica Huggett, Sergiu Luca, and Dana Maiben; lutist Paul O'Dette; recorder player Aldo Abreu; soprano Julianne Baird; countertenor Reginald Mobley; oboist Matthew Peaceman; and Baroque dancers Paige Whitley-Bauguess and Thomas Baird.

Signatory concerts of the ABO include first performances in Atlanta on period instruments:

- Vivaldi's The Four Seasons at Clayton State University's Spivey Hall. (September 27, 1998)
- J. S. Bach's St John Passion at Emory University. (November 11, 2000)
- Handel's Messiah (November 23, 2002)
- Marc-Antoine Charpentier's Te Deum, using a new orchestration completed by musicologist Charles Brewer. (November 16, 2001)
- A year-long celebration of the 250th anniversary of the birth of Mozart (2006), as well as the 300th anniversary of the birth of Haydn (2009).

In addition to its own concerts, the orchestra has performed in collaboration with other organizations throughout the Southeast, including at conferences of the National Flute Convention, the American Musicological Society, and the Southeast Historical Keyboard Society. The ABO has performed on the campuses of Emory University, the University of Georgia, Florida State University, Kennesaw State University, Clayton College and State University, Oglethorpe University, and Valdosta State University. The ABO has performed in venues in Birmingham, Alabama, Pensacola, Florida, Rome, Georgia, and Conyers, Georgia. The orchestra has also partnered with choral organizations including the Emory Concert Choir, Atlanta Choral Artists, the Schola Cantorum of Atlanta, Clayton State Collegiate Chorale, Clayton Camerata, Dekalb Choral Guild, the Westminster Choir, Chandler Choraliers, and choirs from Peachtree Road United Methodist Church in Atlanta, Intown Community Church in Atlanta, and Independent Presbyterian Church, Birmingham, Alabama.

Currently, the ABO is an artist-in-residence at the Cathedral of St. Philip in Atlanta which provides rehearsal and performance space.

== See also ==
- New Trinity Baroque
