= John Garth (composer) =

English composer (1721–1810)

John Garth (1721 – 1810) was an English composer, born in Harperley, near Witton-le-Wear, County Durham.

== Life ==
On 23 June 1742, Garth became a freemason at the lodge meeting at the Bird and Bush in Saddler Street, Durham.

Little else is known of his early life, but in September 1745 and August 1746 he promoted concerts in Stockton. In the latter year, he was living in Durham city, where he organised a concert series until 1772, selling tickets from his house, first in Sadler Street, thereafter in North Bailey, where he lived until after 1791. It appears that the Durham concerts were in alternate weeks to those organised by his friend Charles Avison in Newcastle, where Garth played the cello. Garth's fame spread and he taught music to leading families in the region, as well as giving organ recitals.

In Darlington, in 1794, he married Nancy (Nanny) Wrightson (1749/50–1829). He died at his home, Cockerton Hall, on 29 March 1810 and was buried on 5 April 1810 in the north aisle of St Cuthbert's, Darlington.

== Works ==
Garth is chiefly remembered for his eight-volume edition with English text of The First Fifty Psalms Set to Music by Benedetto Marcello (1757–65). He also composed a set of cello concertos (op. 1, 1760) and five sets of harpsichord sonatas (opp. 2, 4–7, 1768–82), among other works. Gerald Finzi took an interest in his music, among other neglected British composers of the 18th and 19th centuries whose work he sought to have published in modern editions.

== Discography ==
- John Garth, Six Cello Concertos, The Avison Ensemble, 2 discs, Divine Art
- John Garth, Accompanied Keyboard Sonatas Op. 2 and 4, The Avison Ensemble, 2 discs, Divine Art
