= André Laliberté =

Canadian marionette puppeteer (1947–2026)

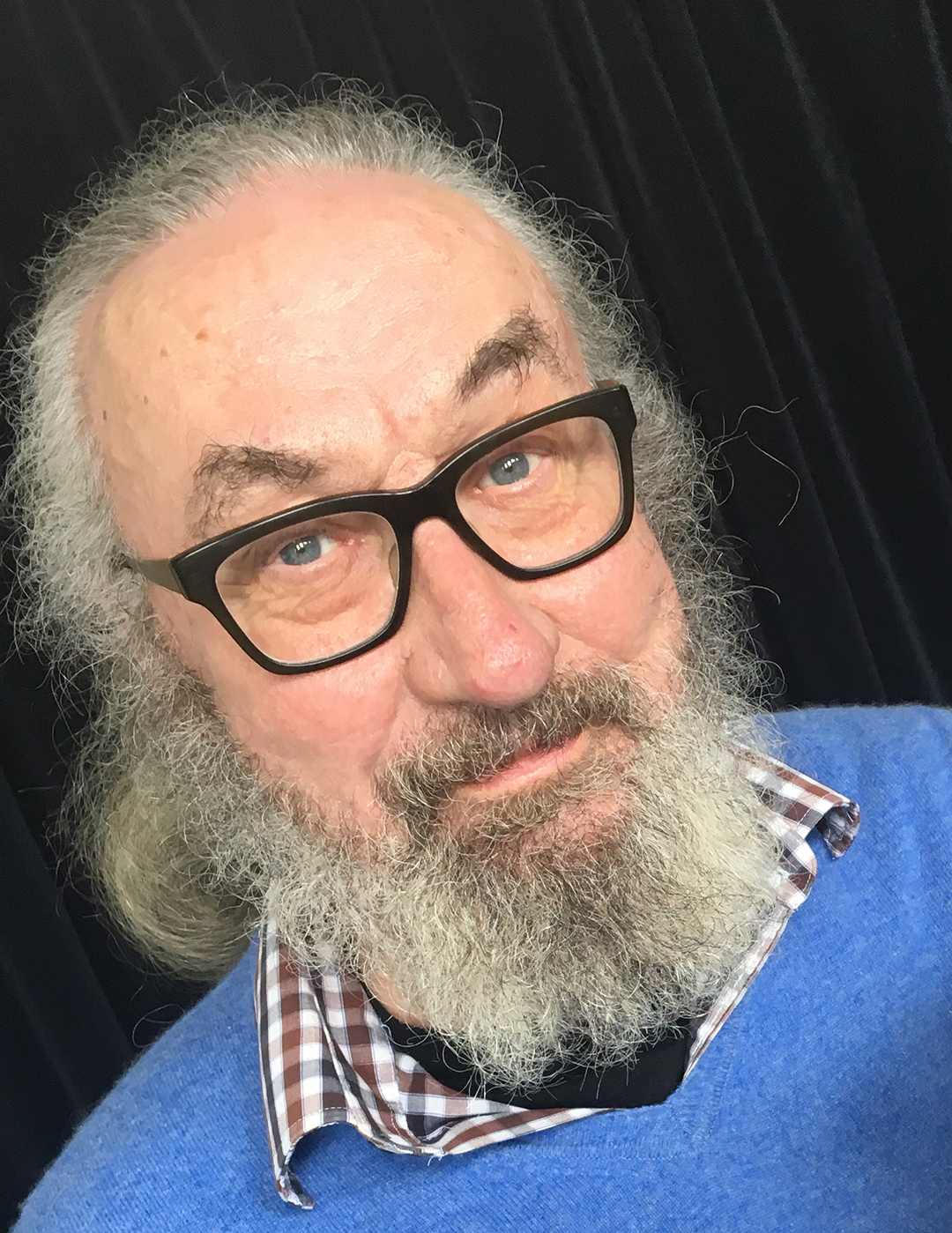
Image of André Laliberté

André Laliberté (1947 – 15 May 2026) was a Canadian marionette puppeteer from Quebec, most noted as the cofounder and longtime artistic director of the Théâtre de l’Œil (Theater of the Eye). He was also a playwright and a director.

== Life and career ==
Laliberté began his lifelong passion for puppetry at age 13, after being exposed to a puppet show while in the hospital recuperating from his injuries after being hit by a car. He then worked for the Les Marionnettes de Montréal, which was then headed by Micheline Legendre.

He launched Théâtre de l’Œil with Francine Saint-Aubin in 1973, remaining with the company as a writer, director and performer until retiring in 2020. One of his noted works was The Starkeeper (Le Porteur), which was a culmination of a research that situated the puppet theater within the realm of visual theatre. This performance featured different puppetry techniques such as rod puppets, hand puppets, shadow theater, masks, and bunraku.

During his career, Laliberté was also a contributor of puppetry for children's television shows such as Une fleur m'a dit. During the course of his tenure at Théâtre de l’Œil, he was able to direct 28 creations and given around 5,000 performances in Canada and around the world.

Laliberté was also the co-founder of La Maison Théâtre, which was established through the initiatives of Théâtre de l’Œil, Les Deux Mondes, and Le Carrousel.

He won a Floyd S. Chalmers Canadian Play Award in 2001 for The Starkeeper, which he co-created with Richard Lacroix and Richard Morin.

Laliberté was the recipient of Quebec's Prix Albert-Tessier in 2020 for his lifetime contributions to Quebec arts and culture, and was inducted into the Ordre des arts et des lettres du Québec in 2022.

Laliberté died on 15 May 2026, at the age of 79.
