= Clori, Tirsi e Fileno =

1707 composition by Handel

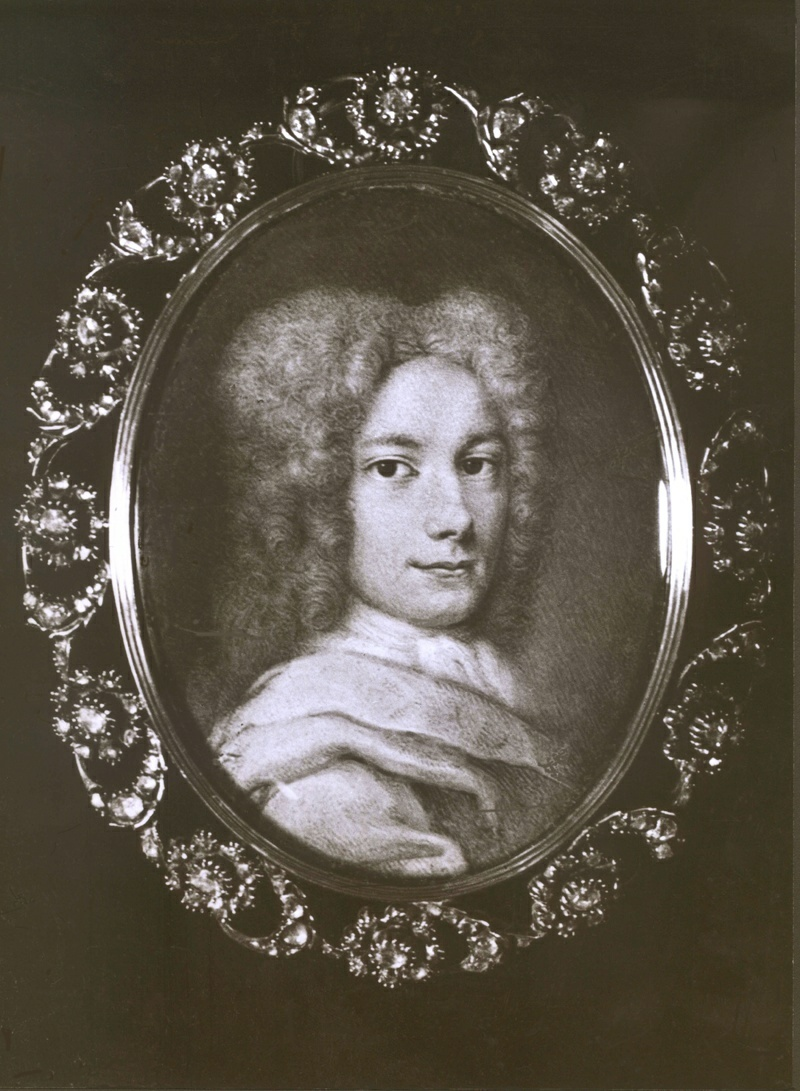
Händel c. 1710

Clori, Tirsi, e Fileno, Cantata a tre (HWV 96), subtitled Cor fedele in vano speri ("A faithful heart hopes in vain"), is a 1707 comic cantata by George Frideric Handel. The subject is a pretty shepherdess who loves two young men, but loses both when they discover her fickleness. Believed lost for many years, the score is the source of arias in some of Handel's later, more celebrated operas.

== History ==
In 1706 Handel left Hamburg for Italy, and in May 1707 began living as composer-in-residence with the Marchese Francesco Maria Ruspoli, traveling between the Bonelli Palace in Rome and the Ruspoli estate. Clori, Tirsi, e Fileno was written sometime before October of that year – a copyist's bill for the work is dated October 14, 1707. There is no certain record of any performance, but it may have been given privately before Handel left for Florence later that year to conduct the premiere of Rodrigo, his first Italian opera, which shares an aria with the cantata.

The cantata was never revived, and for centuries was known only from a fragmentary manuscript score kept in the British Library. A version of this fragment was published by Chrysander in 1889. However, in 1960 musicologist Rudolf Ewerhart announced the discovery of a complete score in the Santini Collection at Münster, the only one in existence.

Comparison of the complete score with the earlier fragment in the British Library reveals revisions made late in composition: Handel had originally closed the cantata with a cynical duet for the two deceived lovers, "Senza occhi" ("Without eyes") in which they heap scorn on womankind and renounce love forever. He replaced this with a more light-hearted trio in which the young woman and her disappointed lovers all join, "Vivere e non amar" ("To live and not to love").

== Musical connections ==
Handel reused the aria "Un sospiretto" twice, that same year in Rodrigo, and in 1732 in the expanded Italian-English version of Acis and Galatea. "Come la rondinella" was also included in the Acis and Galatea revision.

The music for "Amo Tirsi" was used twice more, although with different texts. It was adapted first as "Se vuoi pace" in Agrippina (1709), and again as "As when the dove" in the original, all-English version of Acis and Galatea (1718).

Two of the duets were reused in Rinaldo (1711).

The overture, in a keyboard reduction, became the opening movement of the G-minor suite in Handel's 1st volume of harpsichord suites, published in 1720. And in 1734 it was again heard with full orchestra, appended to the pastiche opera Oreste.
