= Symphony No. 41 (Haydn) =

Symphony in four movements by Joseph Haydn

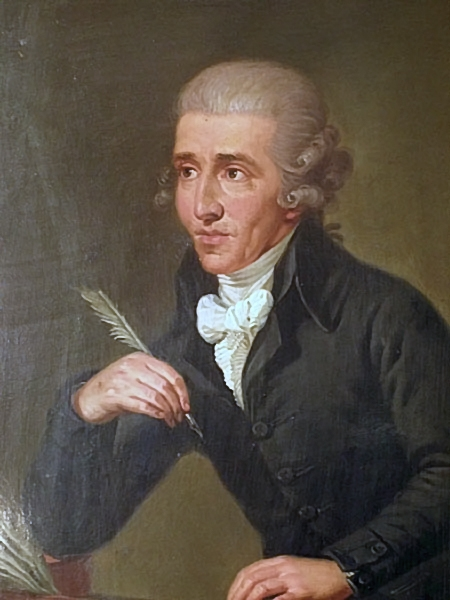
Portrait of Joseph Haydn by Ludwig Guttenbrunn, from c. 1770

The Symphony No. 41 in C major, Hoboken I/41, is a festive symphony by Joseph Haydn. The symphony was composed by 1769. It is scored for flute, two oboes, bassoon, two French horns, two trumpets, timpani and strings.

The work is in four movements:

1. Allegro con spirito, 3/4
2. Un poco andante in F major, 2/4
3. Menuet and Trio, 3/4
4. Presto, 2/4

The flute appears only in the slow movement where it is featured prominently in several elegant solo passages. This is not unusual for Haydn's symphonies. Using that type of solo usually would seem out of place in the classical symphony. He felt the complete freedom to innovate as he wished, as he was composing in the relatively isolated palace of Eszterháza.
