= Barthold Kuijken =

Belgian flautist and recorder player (born 1949)

Barthold Kuijken (Dutch pronunciation: [ˈbɑrtɔlt ˈkœykə(n)]; born 8 March 1949, Dilbeek) is a Belgian flautist and recorder player, known for playing baroque music on historical instruments and particularly known for pioneering this manner of performance with his brothers, cellist and viol player Wieland Kuijken and violinist Sigiswald Kuijken, and the harpsichordist Gustav Leonhardt.

He studied the modern flute at the Bruges Conservatory and the Royal Conservatories of Brussels and The Hague. For playing early music he originally turned to the recorder. Research on authentic instruments, frequent collaboration with various flute and recorder makers, and assiduous study of sources of the 17th and 18th centuries have helped him to specialize in performance on original instruments.

For many years he played in the baroque orchestras Collegium Aureum and La Petite Bande. He plays chamber music concerts all over the world, extending his repertoire to early 19th-century music, and has recorded extensively.

He teaches baroque flute at the Royal Conservatories of Brussels and The Hague.

In 2007 he was the first musician in Belgium to obtain a doctorate in arts ("Doctor in de Kunsten") at the VUB (Free University of Brussels); title of the dissertation (essay): "The Notation is not the Music – Reflections on more than 40 years intensive practice of Early Music." Since 2008, he has been artistic director of the Indianapolis Baroque Orchestra.
