= Newcastle City Library =

- New City Library
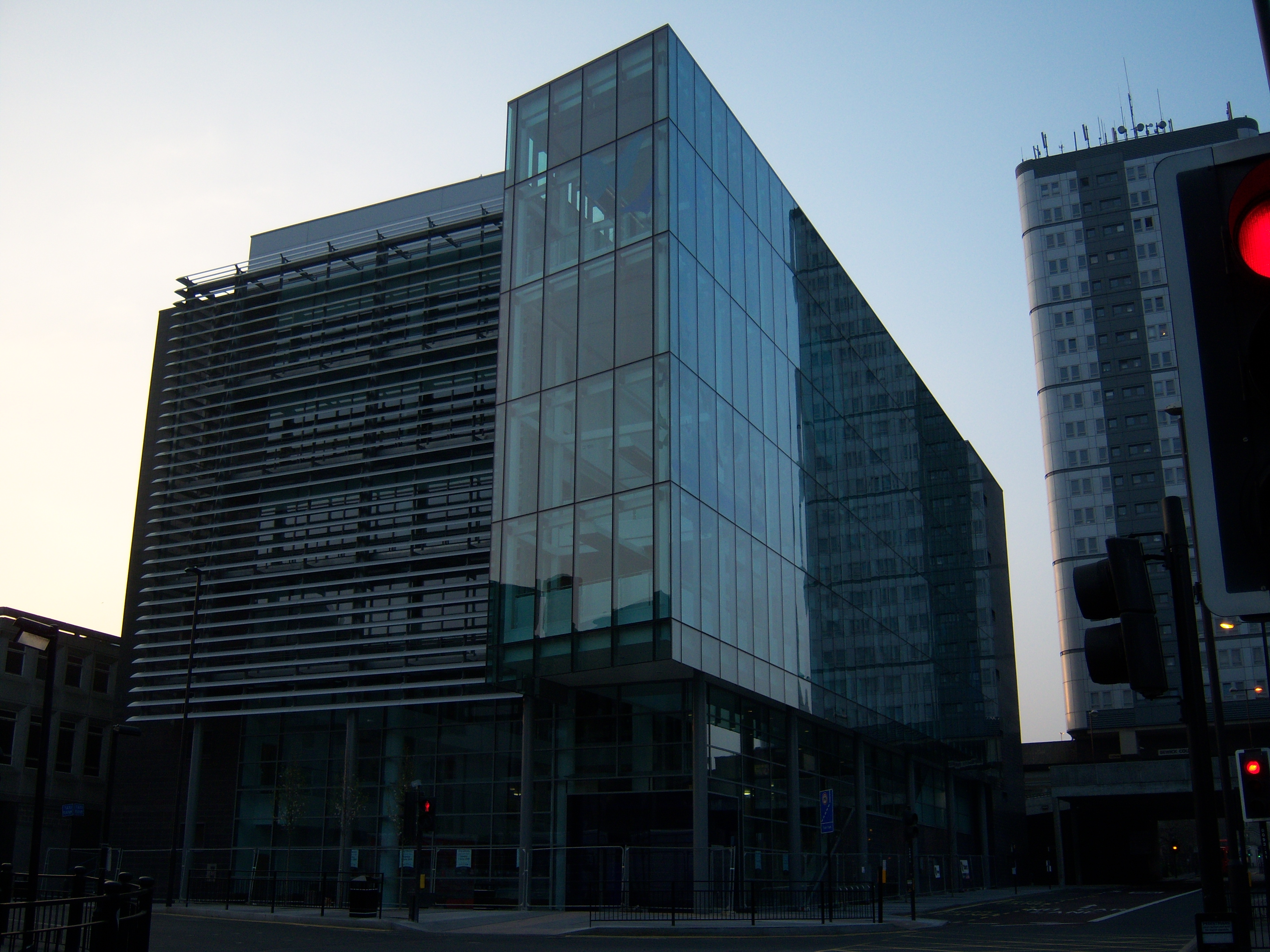
- The Library's main entrance
- Interactive map of the Newcastle City Library area
- Alternative names: Charles Avison Building

General information
- Type: Steel and glass
- Location: Newcastle upon Tyne, United Kingdom
- Coordinates: 54.9749°N 1.6104°W
- Construction started: 17 December 2007
- Completed: 3 March 2009

Technical details
- Floor count: 6

Design and construction
- Architecture firm: Ryder Architecture
- Main contractor: Tolent Construction / Kajima Construction

Newcastle City Library (also known as the Charles Avison Building) is a library in the city centre of Newcastle upon Tyne, United Kingdom. Completed on 3 March 2009, the building opened on 7 June 2009, and is the city's main public library.

== The Victorian building ==
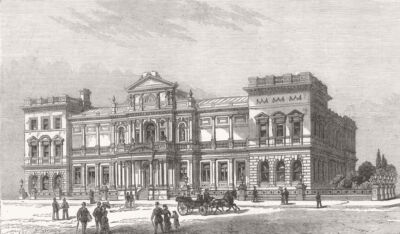
The Victorian building

In the 1870s, the city council decided to commission a public library. The site they selected, on New Bridge Street, had been occupied by the old Carliol Tower, which had formed part of the old town wall. The foundation stone for the new building was laid by the Lord Mayor, Jonathan Angus, on 13 September 1880.

The building was designed by Alfred Mountain Fowler in the neoclassical style, built in ashlar stone and was officially opened by the Prince and Princess of Wales on 20 August 1883.

The design involved a symmetrical main frontage of 15 bays facing onto New Bridge Street, with the end sections of three bays each projected forward to form towers. The central section of three bays, which was also projected forward, featured a portico formed by Doric order columns supporting an entablature. On the first floor, there were a series of Corinthian order columns supporting a cornice and, at roof level, the central bay was surmounted by four caryatids supporting a pediment. Internally, the principal rooms were a lending library, which was 60 feet (18 m) long and 40 feet (12 m) wide, and a semi-circular reference library, which was 58 feet (18 m) long and 36 feet (11 m) wide.

== The 1960s building ==
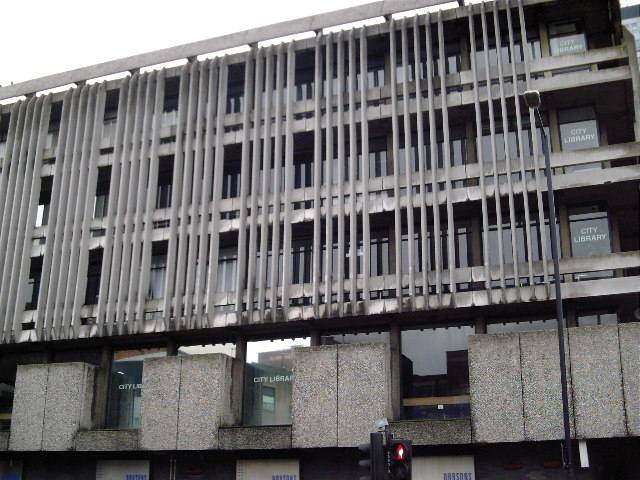
The 1960s building

The original building was demolished in the mid-1960s to make way for a new structure on the corner of John Dobson Street and New Bridge Street West. The neighbouring Laing Art Gallery, which had been built adjacent to the old Victorian library, was left somewhat out of context following the demolition of the older building, with a blind brick wall facing towards the city centre. The new building was designed by Sir Basil Spence in the brutalist style, built in concrete and steel and was opened in 1968.

The road to the rear of the library, John Dobson Street, used to have a concrete canopy which extended over the dual carriageway stretching from Durant Road up to the junction of New Bridge Street West. The canopy was at the official ground floor level of the library and provided a rear entrance for the library, with access onto what was ultimately a rather unused pedestrian area with seats and other street furniture. The arrangement formed part of the 1960s "City in the Sky" vision.

The city council changed the name of the building from Central Library to City Library in the late 1990s. It became unfit for the purpose of a public library. The design was said to be ugly, with TV presenter and author John Grundy describing it as "a monstrous concrete blob". The building was closed on 1 September 2006 and demolished.

== The new building ==
The foundation stone for the new building was laid by the Lord Mayor, Peter John Arnold, on 17 December 2007. It was designed by Ryder Architecture in the modern style and featured a long 'glass box' which formed the eastern side of the steel frame structure. It was built by a joint venture of Tolent Construction and Kajima Construction at a cost of £24 million. The Poet Laureate Andrew Motion was guest of honour at the handover of the new building from the contractors to the city council on 3 March 2009.

The public opening day, 7 June 2009, saw a programme of entertainment from musicians performing in the entrance hall with fictional characters including Captain Hook, Sherlock Holmes, Alice in Wonderland, The Queen of Hearts, The Gruffalo and Peter Rabbit. The six-storey building contained a marble-floored atrium, a viewing platform, a 185-seat performance space, a café and an exhibition space. It was named the Charles Avison Building, after the 18th-century Newcastle composer, and officially opened by Queen Elizabeth II and Prince Philip, Duke of Edinburgh on 6 November 2009.

When it first opened the new building used technologies specifically designed for use in libraries. It was an early adopter of RFID library tagging technology. Every book was fitted with a digital tag, meaning books could be checked out and returned via automated checkout points, and theft of stock would become much harder. Staff members carried hands-free voice-activated WiFi radios to communicate with other members of staff, a first in the UK.

In 2016, the library featured in scenes in the film I, Daniel Blake, directed by Ken Loach, where the eponymous character upon losing his life-long job as a builder goes to the library to get online to apply for welfare benefits.
