= Portland Baroque Orchestra =

- Orchestra
- Founded: 1984
- Principal conductor: Julian Perkins
- Website: www.pbo.org

Portland Baroque Orchestra (PBO) is an orchestra based in Portland, which is dedicated to historically informed performance of Baroque, Classical and early Romantic music on original instruments. It was founded in 1984 by harpsichordist, teacher, and early music pioneer Ton Koopman, and Monica Huggett served as artistic director from 1995 until 2021.

Julian Perkins was appointed artistic director in 2022. In addition, Portland Baroque Orchestra has engaged eminent guest conductors to its podium including Paul Agnew, John Butt, Richard Egarr, Paul O'Dette, Andrew Manze, Alexander Weimann, and Stanley Ritchie.

PBO performs a six-program subscription season in the greater Portland area—and is regularly heard on tour in the region, especially with the Oregon Bach Festival. The orchestra performed Handel's opera Rinaldo and Cavalli's La Calisto with Portland Opera.

In 2006, PBO began a successful annual collaboration with the vocal ensemble Cappella Romana. Joint productions have included Handel's Messiah every year, Bach's St. John Passion (including CD release), and two thematic programs of choral works by Bach, Handel and Vivaldi, and a project at the Portland Art Museum for an exhibition of Venetian musical instruments.

Portland Baroque Orchestra has made a number of recordings for the label Avie.

In 2015, PBO launched its own CD label, Portland Baroque Media.

== See also ==
- Culture of Portland, Oregon
