= Les Voix Humaines =

Canadian viol ensemble

Les Voix Humaines is a Canadian viol ensemble based in Montreal, Quebec. The two principal members are Susie Napper and Margaret Little, two gambists. The group performs mainly Baroque music, in particular works by French composers.

== History ==
Les Voix Humaines first came together in 1985; they named their group after a viola da gamba composition by Marin Marais. The duo have made several recordings for the Canadian ATMA Classique label, including The Spirite of Musicke with soprano Suzie LeBlanc, featuring the viol music of Alfonso Ferrabosco, Tobias Hume, John Jenkins and Christopher Simpson in 2001.

In 2009 the group recorded an album, Fanstasies, using six eighteenth century instruments from the collection of the University of Toronto. The instruments had to be restored to playing condition before the group could use them. Two other recordings are Sainte Colombe: Concertos for bass viol/Les Voix Humaines and Sainte-Colombe Concerts a deux Violes Esgales, which study and perform the works of two composers who were father and son.

In 2013 the group released an album, Bach: L'Art de la fugue.
