= Newport Baroque Orchestra =

Newport Baroque Orchestra (Newport, RI, USA) is a professional period instrument orchestra devoted to the music of the 17th and 18th centuries. The orchestra gives concerts in Newport throughout the year, linking the music of the past to Newport's own character as an 18th-century city.
