= Les Esprits Animaux =

Netherlands-based band

Les Esprits Animaux is a Netherlands-based baroque band created in 2009. The group is devoted to the historically informed performance of baroque music. The ensemble is named after a philosophical term used in the baroque period which defines a certain kind of “subtle stream” that runs through the bodies of human beings and is able to affect the passions of the soul.

== History ==
In 2009, band member violinist Tomoe Badiarova recorded two CDs for the Ambronay label. Since 2010, Les Esprits Animaux are in residency in the Festival d’Ambronay. For three consecutive years, the group has been invited to concert series in the Kerkconcerts in 't Woudt in the Netherlands. In 2011, the Fundación La Caixa selected Les Esprits Animaux to perform in several cities in Spain within the framework of Festival Antiqva, a part of the 34th edition of the Festival de Música Antigua de Barcelona. The band has also played at the Fringe (2010) and Fabulous Fringe 2011 in Utrecht, MA Fringe Festival 2011 in Bruges, Laus Polyphoniae 2011 (AMUZ) in Antwerp, Göttinger Reihe Historischer Musik competition in 2012 in Göttingen and Ghent Festival in 2012. Les Esprits Animaux was selected as “Promising ensemble 2011” in the International Young Artists Platform in Antwerp.

Other past projects included the Day of La Petite Bande in Leuven, concerts in the European Parliament in Brussels representing Ambronay as European Culture Ambassador 2011. After having recorded its first CD for Ambronay Éditions (Harmonia Mundi) with a programme dedicated to G. Ph. Telemann in 2011, the ensemble recorded its second CD in 2013 with a programme entitled “Transfigurations” for the same label. Les Esprits Animaux has been awarded a Young Ensembles Residency at the Centre Culturel de Rencontre d'Ambronay. The ensemble won the International Van Wassenaer Competition Utrecht in 2016.

== Discography ==
- Georg Philipp Telemann (1681–1767) A Journey through Literature - Ambronay Éditions AMY302
- Bach, Corrette, Geminiani.. Transfigurations - Ambronay Éditions AMY039
