= Matthew Wadsworth =

English lutenist (born 1974)

Matthew Wadsworth (born 1974) is an English lutenist. Wadsworth was born in Manchester with blindness. He attended a school for the visually impaired as a child, but at age 16 he became the first blind student at Chetham's School of Music in Manchester.

Wadsworth went on to study with Nigel North at the Royal Academy of Music where he received the London Student of the Year award in 1997, in recognition of his work on the development of Braille lute tablature.

Wadsworth has appeared in many festivals and concert halls (e.g. Wigmore Hall, Metropolitan Museum of Art) in Europe and North America; and his recordings have received critical acclaim. His solo recital CDs have been released by Channel Classics Records. He has worked with vocalists James Gilchrist and Carolyn Sampson as well as a number of other chamber musicians.
