= Shana Carroll =

American choreographer and circus director

Shana Carroll is an American choreographer and circus director. A former trapeze artist, she is a co-founding artistic director of The 7 Fingers. Her credits include Traces, Crystal, Passagers and Dear San Francisco, as well as the Broadway musical Water for Elephants, for which she and Jesse Robb received a Tony Award nomination and won a Chita Rivera Award.

== Early life ==
Carroll attended Berkeley High School, performed in school plays and initially considered becoming an actor. After graduating, her father, journalist Jon Carroll, suggested that she take a box-office job with the Pickle Family Circus, on whose board he served.

== Career ==
At 18, Carroll began training on trapeze and became a performing apprentice with the Pickle Family Circus. In November 1989, she took over the company's aerialist act and remained with the company for approximately eighteen months.

After leaving the company, Carroll moved to Montreal hoping to train with coach André Simard at the National Circus School. After nearly a year, she began working with Simard and later followed him to the École de Cirque Rosny-sous-Bois near Paris.

Carroll subsequently joined Cirque du Soleil. By 1996, she was a solo aerialist on the European tour of Saltimbanco.

In 2002, Carroll and six other artists founded The 7 Fingers as they sought to move from performance into creating their own productions. She is a co-founding artistic director of the company.

With fellow co-founder Gypsy Snider, Carroll later co-directed and choreographed Traces. Carroll and Snider received a joint 2008 Drama Desk Award for Outstanding Choreography nomination for the production.

In 2012, Carroll choreographed Cirque du Soleil's performance at the 84th Academy Awards. The following year, she was the circus designer and a co-creator of the immersive production Queen of the Night, which began performances at the Diamond Horseshoe in New York in December 2013.

In 2017, Carroll and Sébastien Soldevila directed Crystal, Cirque du Soleil's first production on ice. The following year, she wrote, directed and choreographed The 7 Fingers production Passagers. The production was presented in the United States under the English title Passengers.

In 2021, Carroll and Snider created and directed Dear San Francisco: A High-Flying Love Story, a resident production at Club Fugazi in San Francisco.

In 2023, Carroll was named a Companion of the Ordre des arts et des lettres du Québec.

In 2024, Carroll was the circus designer and, with Jesse Robb, co-choreographer of the Broadway musical Water for Elephants. Carroll and Robb were nominated for the 2024 Tony Award for Best Choreography. For the same production, they won the 2024 Chita Rivera Award for Outstanding Choreography in a Broadway Show, sharing the award with Camille A. Brown for Hell's Kitchen.

In 2026, Carroll wrote, directed and choreographed The Attic: Things I've Seen While Lying on My Back, an autobiographical circus production that premiered at the Goodman Theatre in Chicago. Reviewing the production for BroadwayWorld, Rachel Weinberg praised Carroll's use of acrobatics to convey autobiographical themes.
