= Alexander Weimann =

German conductor and harpsichordist

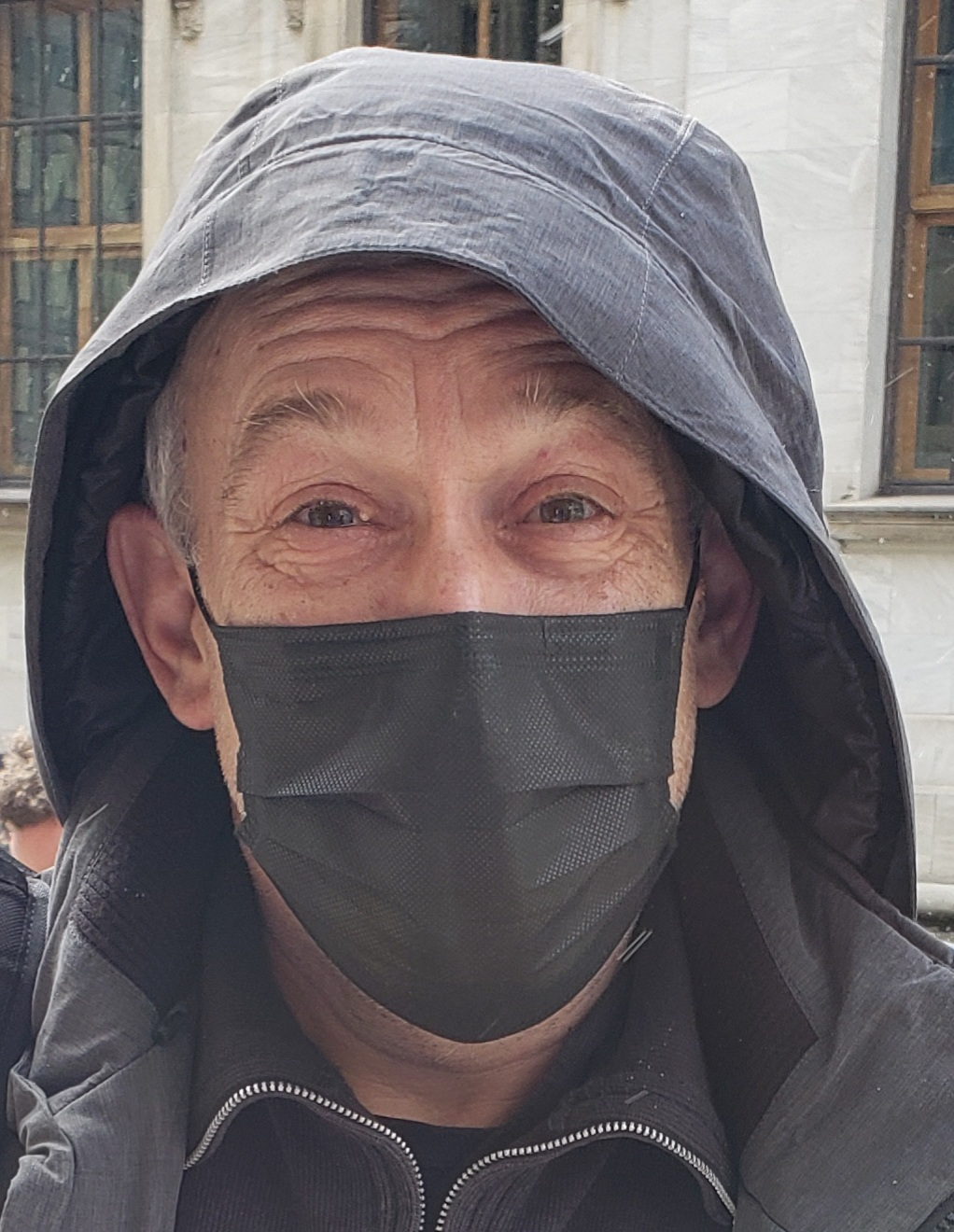

Alexander Weimann (born 1965, in Munich) is a German conductor and harpsichordist.

Weimann studied in Munich and then was a teacher at the Münchner Musikhochschule 1990–1995. He is a regular conductor of Les Voix Baroques and the Arion Ensemble.

Since 2009 he has been the music director of Pacific Baroque Orchestra in Vancouver, BC.
