= Jaap ter Linden =

Dutch cellist, viol player and conductor (born 1947)

Jaap ter Linden (born 10 April 1947, in Rotterdam) is a Dutch cellist, viol player and conductor. He specialises in performance of baroque and classical music on authentic instruments.

He began his career as principal cellist of notable baroque orchestras, including Musica Antiqua Köln, The English Concert and Amsterdam Baroque Orchestra. He co-founded the ensemble Musica da Camera, and in 2000 founded the Mozart Akademie in Amsterdam, an orchestra specialising in the classical repertoire, whom he conducts, and with whom he has recorded the complete Mozart symphonies. He has been guest-conductor of both modern and period-instrument orchestras, including the Deutsche Kammerphilharmonie, Portland Baroque Orchestra, European Union Baroque Orchestra, and Philharmonia Baroque Orchestra. He has also conducted opera, including Henry Purcell’s King Arthur and Christoph Willibald Gluck’s Iphigénie en Aulide.

He performs chamber music with pianist Ronald Brautigam, violinists Elizabeth Wallfisch, Andrew Manze, and John Holloway, as well as harpsichordists Richard Egarr and Lars Ulrik Mortensen. He has recorded Bach's suites for solo cello twice. With Egarr he has recorded Bach's sonatas for viola da gamba and harpsichord, and with Egarr and Manze, Bach's violin sonatas. With Mortensen and Holloway he has recorded Dieterich Buxtehude's complete chamber music, and with Ton Koopman, Pieter Hellendaal's cello sonatas.

He teaches at the Royal Conservatory of The Hague, at the Amsterdam Conservatory and at the Hochschule für Alte Musik in Würzburg.
