= Monica Huggett =

British musician (born 1953)

Monica Huggett (born 16 May 1953 in London, England) is a British conductor and leading baroque violinist.

== Biography ==
At the age of 16, Huggett started studying at the Royal Academy of Music, London, with Manoug Parikian and Kato Havas, baroque violin with Sigiswald Kuijken.

Huggett co-founded and served as leader of the Amsterdam Baroque Orchestra under Ton Koopman from 1980 to 1987. She was made a Fellow of the Royal Academy of Music in 1994, and serves as professor of baroque violin at the Hochschule für Künste Bremen, Germany. She won Gramophone Awards for her recordings of Bach's Sonatas and Partitas for solo violin (1997) and Biber's violin sonatas (2002).

Huggett was Artistic Director of the Portland Baroque Orchestra from 1995 until 2021. She has also served as the director of The Hanover Band and guest director of the Arion Baroque Orchestra, Montreal; Tafelmusik, Toronto; Orchestra of the Age of Enlightenment; Los Angeles Chamber Orchestra; Philharmonia Baroque, San Francisco; Norwegian Chamber Orchestra; and Concerto Copenhagen. Huggett also worked with Christopher Hogwood at the Academy of Ancient Music; with Trevor Pinnock and the English Concert; and toured the US in concert with James Galway.

Huggett continues as Artistic Director of the Irish Baroque Orchestra and is guest director of the Seville Baroque Orchestra. She also founded the baroque Ensemble Sonnerie and Hausmusik London as a chamber ensemble which concentrates on romantic music.

Huggett has given master classes on baroque violin in Banff, Dartington, Vicenza, Dublin, The Hague, Medellin and The Royal College of Music.

In 2008 she was appointed director of the new graduate program in historical performance at The Juilliard School in New York City.

== Recordings ==
Vivaldi: (The four seasons inside). Il cimento dell'armonia e dell'inventione Op.8. Virgin Classics. La cetra Op.9. Virgin Classics.

Beethoven:Sinfonie n. 1 op.21 in do maggiore,Sinfonia n.2 op.36 in re maggiore,Sinfonia n.5 in op. 67 in do minore.The Hanover Band.Nimbus Records
