= Les Voix Baroques =

Canadian vocal ensemble

Les Voix Baroques is a Canadian vocal ensemble specializing in early music. The ensemble was founded in 1999 by Matthew White (countertenor), Chloe Meyers (violinist) and Amanda Keesmaat (harpsichordist).

== Discography ==
- Carissimi Oratorios ATMA Classique
- Canticum canticorum - motets from the Song of Songs ATMA Classique
- Humori. Venetian carnival songs and madrigals. ATMA Classique
- J.S. Bach Johannes-Passion ATMA Classique
- O Poore Distracted World! - English Songs & Anthems. Yulia Van Doren, Shannon Mercer (sopranos), Matthew White (alto), Charles Daniels (tenor), Tyler Duncan (baritone) & Robert Macdonald (bass). Les Voix Baroques, Alexander Weimann ATMA Classique
