= Josée =

Josée is a female given name of French origin.

== People named Josée ==
- Josée Auclair (born 1962), Canadian explorer
- Josée Beaudin (born 1961), Canadian politician
- Josée Bélanger (born 1986), Canadian soccer player
- Josée Charbonneau (born 1972), Canadian freestyle skier
- Josée Chouinard (born 1969), Canadian figure skater
- Josée Corbeil (born 1973), Canadian volleyball player
- Josée Dayan (born 1943), French filmmaker and producer
- Josée Deschênes (born 1961), Canadian actress
- Josée Deshaies, Canadian cinematographer
- Josée Duplessis, Canadian politician
- Josée Dupuis, Canadian biostatistician
- Josée Forest-Niesing (1964–2021), Canadian lawyer and politician
- Josée France, Canadian pairs figure skater
- Josée Lebel (born 1963), Canadian Volleyball player
- Josée Legault (born 1966), Canadian journalist
- Josée Lorsché (born 1961), Luxembourgish politician
- Josée Marsolais (born 1973), Canadian water polo player
- Josée Nadeau, Canadian painter
- Josée Nahi (born 1989), Ivorian soccer player
- Josée Néron, Canadian politician
- Josée Piché (born 1974), Canadian ice dancer
- Josée Verner (born 1959), Canadian politician
- Josée Vigneron-Ramackers (1914–2002), Belgian music educator, composer, and conductor
- Josée Yvon (1950–1994), Canadian playwright, poet, and screenwriter

== People named Marie-Josée ==
- Marie-Josée Bazin (born 1952), French archer
- Marie-Josée Bédard, Canadian judge
- Marie-Josée Coulombe (born 1965), Canadian sculptor
- Marie-Josée Croze (born 1970), Canadian actress
- Marie-Josée Fortin (born 1958), Canadian ecologist and professor
- Marie-Josée Frank (born 1952), Luxembourgish politician
- Marie-Josée Gilbeau-Ouimet (born 1972), Canadian sprint canoeist
- Marie-Josée Houle, Canadian musician and housing advocate
- Marie-Josée Ifoku (born 1965), Congolese politician
- Marie-Josée Jacobs (born 1950), Luxembourgish politician
- Marie-Josée Kravis (born 1949), Canadian economist
- Marie-Josée Lord (born 1970), Haitian–born Canadian opera singer
- Marie-Josée Morneau (born 1969), Canadian judoka
- Marie-Josée Roig (1938–2024), French politician
- Marie-Josée Saint-Pierre (born 1978), Canadian animator and documentarian
- Marie-Josée Simard (born 1956), Canadian percussionist and music educator

== Fiction ==
- Josee, a character from The Ridonculous Race
- Josée (film), a 2020 Korean romantic drama film directed by Kim Jong-kwan

== See also ==
- Josée and René de Chambrun Foundation, non-profit charitable foundation based in Paris, France
