= ATMA Classique =

ATMA Classique Records
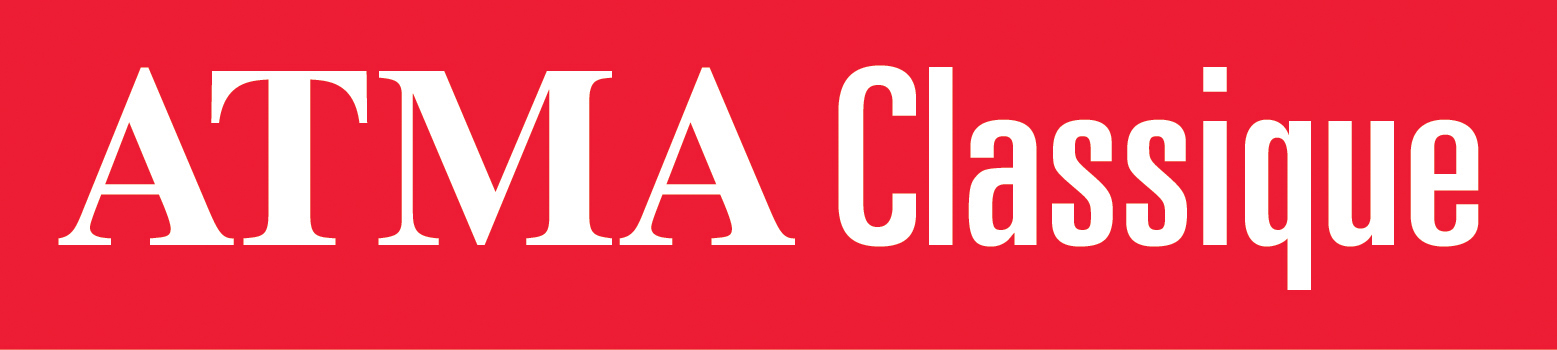
- Founded: 1994
- Founder: Johanne Goyette
- Genre: Classical music; Baroque music; Choir; Opera; Chamber music
- Country of origin: Canada
- Location: Montreal
- Official website: www.atmaclassique.com

ATMA Classique is an independent classical record label based in Montreal, and welcomes artists from Quebec, across Canada, and around the world.

== History ==
ATMA Classique was founded in Montreal in 1994 by Johanne Goyette and has made a name for itself through the sound quality of its recordings and its choice of bold projects.

The label is more committed than ever to producing and recording the unique moments of inspiration of its talented musicians, with whom it has established warm and intimate relationships based on mutual trust.

On 1 April 2020, ATMA Classique was acquired by the Ad Litteram group, founded by Guillaume Lombart in 1998.

Today, the label's catalogue includes more than 700 releases, ranging from medieval music to contemporary music, baroque music, world music, tango, chanson, and symphonic works. The albums are distributed in 25 countries and are available on all music streaming platforms.

Several recordings released by the company have won Juno, Opus and Felix Awards.

== Main artists ==
- Arion Baroque Orchestra
- Bernard Labadie, conductor
- David Jalbert, pianist
- Karina Gauvin, soprano
- Les Violons du Roy
- Les Voix Humaines
- Louise Bessette, pianist
- Marie-Josée Lord, soprano
- Marie-Josée Simard, percussionist
- Orchestre Métropolitain
- Orchestre Symphonique de Québec
- Stéphane Tétreault, cellist
- Studio de musique ancienne de Montréal
- Suzie LeBlanc, soprano
- Valérie Milot, harpist
- Yannick Nézet-Séguin, conductor
