= Marie-José =

Marie-José, Marie-Jose or Marie-Josée is a compound given name which may refer to:

- Marie-José of Belgium (1906–2001), Belgian princess and last Queen consort of Italy
- Marie-Josée Arès-Pilon (born 1982), Canadian weightlifter
- Marie-Josée Bazin (born 1952), French archer
- Marie-José Béguelin (born 1949), Swiss linguist
- Marie-José Chombart de Lauwe (born 1923), French Resistance member and sociologist
- Marie-Jose Cooper (born 1960), New Zealand footballer
- Marie-Josée Coulombe (born 1965), Canadian sculptor
- Marie-Josée Croze (born 1970), Canadian actress
- Marie-José Denys (1950–2022), French politician
- Marie-Josée Fortin (born 1958), Canadian biologist
- Marie-Josée Gilbeau-Ouimet (born 1972), Canadian sprint kayaker
- Marie-José de Groot (born 1966), Dutch rower
- Marie-Josée Jacobs (born 1950), Luxembourgish politician
- Marie-José Kersaudy (born 1954), French swimmer
- Marie-Josée Kravis (born 1949), Canadian businesswoman and philanthropist
- Marie-José Laloy (born 1950), Belgian politician
- Marie-Josée Lord (born 1970), Haitian-born Canadian opera singer
- Marie-Josée Morneau (born 1969), Canadian judoka
- Marie-José Nadal-Gardère (1931–2020), Haitian painter and sculptor
- Marie-José Nat, stage name of Marie-José Benhalassa (1940–2019), French actress
- Marie-José Pérec (born 1968), French sprinter
- Marie-Josée Roig (1938–2024), French politician
- Marie-Josée Saint-Pierre (born 1978), Canadian filmmaker, producer and screenwriter
- Marie-Josée Simard (born 1956), Canadian percussionist and music educator

== See also ==
- Marie Josée Ta Lou-Smith (born 1988), Ivorian sprinter
