= Stéphane Tétreault =

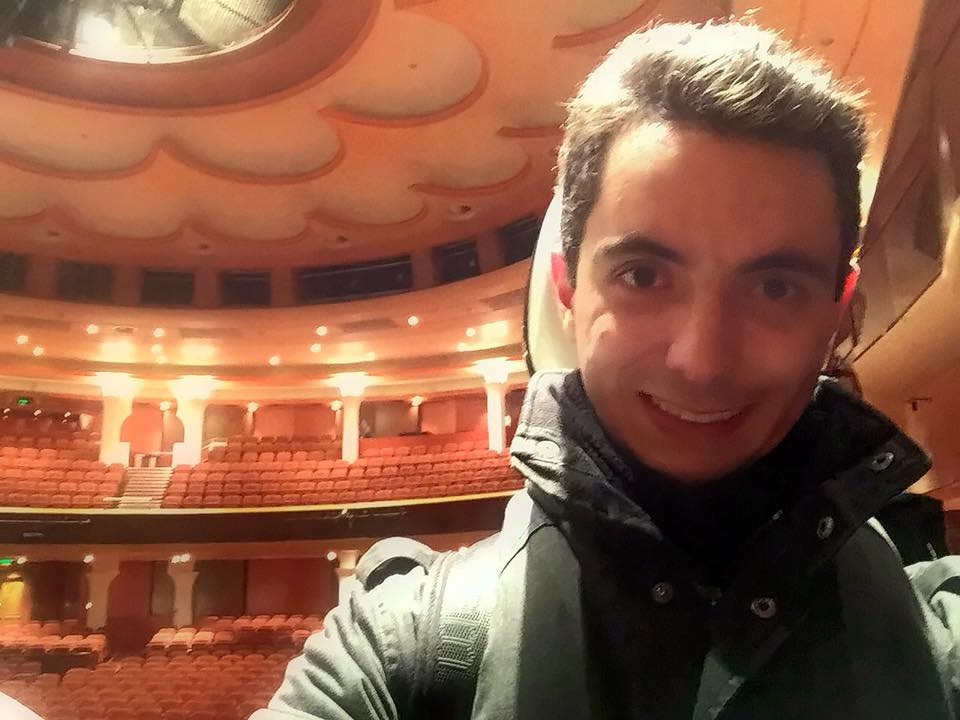
- Stéphane Tétreault at the Brighton Dome after performing with the London Philharmonic Orchestra

Background information
- Born: 10 April 1993 (age 33); Montreal, Quebec, Canada
- Genres: Classical
- Occupation: Cellist
- Instrument: Cello
- Years active: 2010 – present
- Website: stephanetetreault.com

Stéphane Tétreault (born 10 April 1993) is a Canadian cellist. He first made international headlines as the recipient of Bernard Greenhouse's cello, the 1707 "Countess of Stainlein Ex-Paganini" Stradivarius, loaned to him by Mrs. Jacqueline Desmarais and following her death, by her daughter Mrs. Sophie Desmarais.

== Critics ==
Stéphane Tétreault has been praised by the world's leading music critics: "Tétreault’s disc charmed me from the off; this is just pure, lyrical, unadulterated playing of the highest order, with a maturity that belies his 22 years... I can’t wait to hear more from him." (Charlotte Gardner, Gramophone), "His vibrato and tone are varied, his bowing techniques immaculate and his awareness of harmony and consequent shading omnipresent." (Joanne Talbot, The Strad), "The solo playing is astonishingly mature not merely in its technical attributes but also in its warmth, brilliance and subtlety of colour and inflection." (Geoffrey Norris, Gramophone).

== Awards and recognition ==
- 2026 - nominated for a Juno Award for Classical Album of the Year – Large Ensemble - Les Violons du Roy conducted by Airat Ichmouratov featuring Elvira Misbakhova and Stéphane Tétreault, Ichmouratov: The Ninth Wave, Viola Concerto No. 2, Cello Concerto No. 1 - ATMA Classique
- 2025 - Stradivatango - Prix Opus - Concert of the Year / World Music - CQM - Conseil québécois de la musique
- 2022 - Prix Opus - Performer of the Year - CQM - Conseil québécois de la musique
- 2019 - Virginia Parker Prize (Canada Council for the Arts)
- 2018 - Maureen Forrester Next Generation Award from Stratford Summer Music Festival
- 2015 - Career Development Award from the Women's Musical Club of Toronto
- 2014 - Fernand-Lindsay Career Development Award from the Fondation Père Lindsay
- 2014 - Sylva Gelber Music Foundation Award
- 2013 - Choquette-Symcox Award conferred by JM Canada Foundation and Jeunesses Musicales Canada
- 2012 - Révélation Radio-Canada in Classical Music
- 2012 - Hnatyshyn Foundation Award
- 2007 - First Prize Winner – Montreal Symphony Orchestra OSM/Standard Life Competition

== Recordings ==
- 2026 - Ichmouratov: The Ninth Wave, Viola Concerto No. 2, Cello Concerto No. 1 - Les Violons du Roy conducted by Airat Ichmouratov featuring Elvira Misbakhova and Stéphane Tétreault, ATMA Classique
- 2025 - Stradivatango - Works for Cello and Bandoneon from composer and bandoneonist Denis Plante - ATMA Classique
- 2024 - Claude Debussy: Images retrouvées - Works for Cello and Piano from composer Claude Debussy - Piano and arrangements Olivier Hébert-Bouchard - ATMA Classique
- 2023 - Claude Debussy: Images oubliées - Works for Cello and Piano from composer Claude Debussy - Piano and arrangements Olivier Hébert-Bouchard - ATMA Classique
- 2022 - Suite Tango - Works for Cello and Bandoneon from composer and bandoneonist Denis Plante; Inspired by the unaccompanied cello suites by J. S. Bach - ATMA Classique
- 2022 - Transfiguration - Works for Cello and Harp from Marjan Mozetich; Caroline Lizotte, Alexandre Grogg, Kelly-Marie Murphy and François Vallières; Valérie Milot - ATMA Classique
- 2017 - Trio for Violin, Cello and Harp - Henriette Renié, Jacques Ibert, Halvorsen and Schubert; Valérie Milot, Antoine Bareil; Groupe Analekta
- 2015 - Work for Cello and Piano - Haydn, Schubert, Brahms; Marie-Ève Scarfone; Groupe Analekta
- 2014 - Bookburners - Work for Cello and Turntable; Nicole Lizée; DJ P-Love (Paolo Kapunan); Bande à part (Radio-Canada); Centrediscs
- 2013 - Par Amour Pour Philou - Improvisation nocturne pour Philou; François Dompierre; Justin Time Records
- 2012 - Saint-Saëns & Tchaikovsky - Concertos for Cello and Orchestra; Orchestre symphonique de Québec; Fabien Gabel; Groupe Analekta
