= Bernard Labadie =

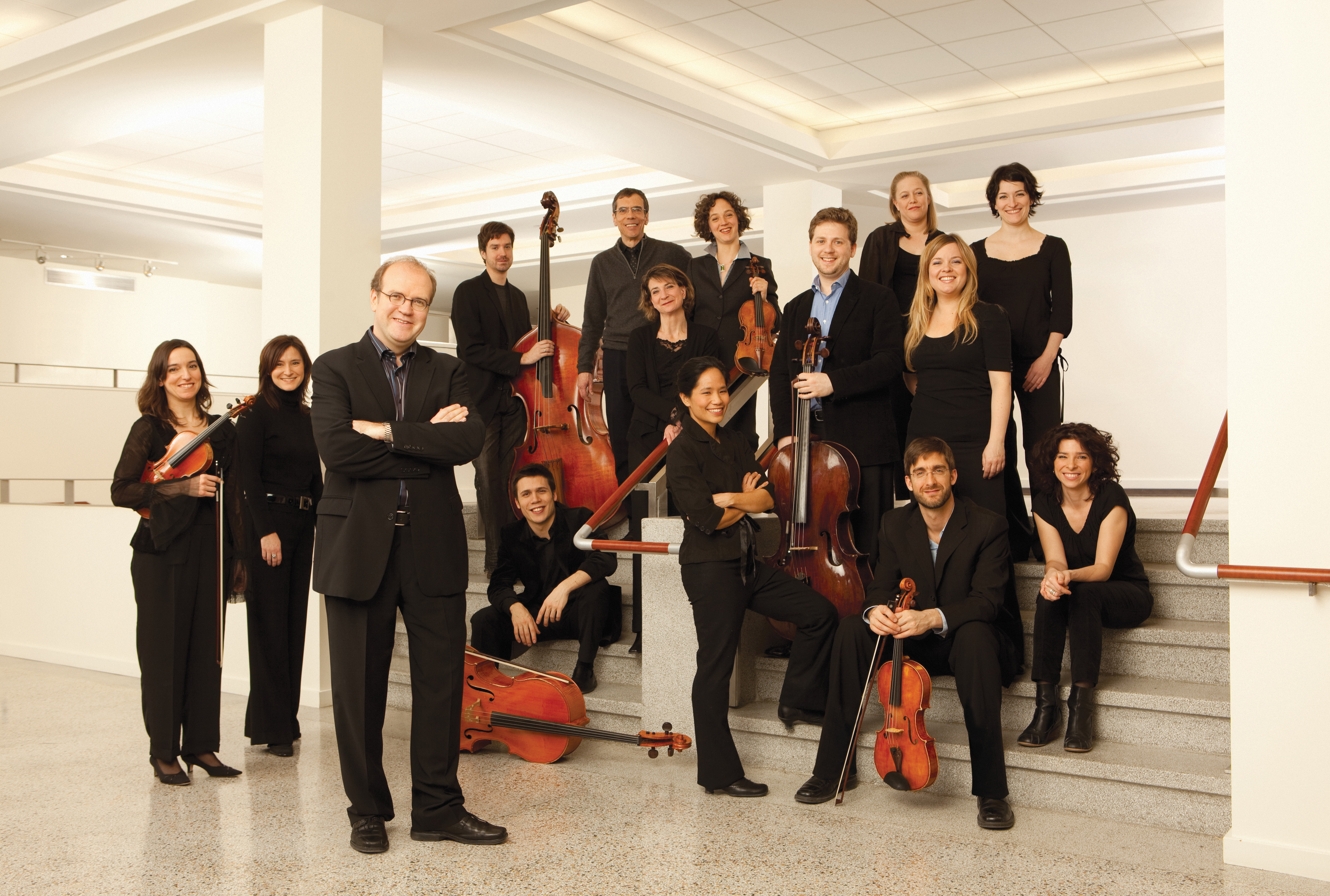
- Conductor Bernard Labadie and Les Violons du Roy (2010)
- Born: March 27, 1963 (age 63); Quebec City, Canada
- Education: Laval University
- Occupation: Conductor
- Awards: Officer of the Order of Canada - Chevalier de l’Ordre National du Québec - Samuel de Champlain award

Bernard Labadie (born March 27, 1963) is a Canadian conductor.

== Biography ==
Labadie was born in Quebec City, Canada. He graduated from the School of Music at Laval University. During Labadie's education at Laval University in 1983, Labadie directed his first orchestras as a student project. He studied Gregorian chant with Dom Jean Claire at the Saint-Pierre de Solesmes Abbey in France and conducted privately with Simon Streatfeild (1983–87), Pierre Dervaux at the Domaine Forget (1986, 1987), in Saumur, France (1987), and briefly at the Bachakademie in Stuttgart, Germany with John Eliot Gardiner (1991).

After Labadie graduated from Laval University, he founded the ensembles Les Violons du Roy in 1984 and the choir La Chapelle de Québec (under the original name l'Ensemble vocal Bernard Labadie) in 1985. Labadie subsequently served as music director of Les Violons du Roy from its creation in 1985 through 2014. Labade has been music director of La Chapelle de Québec from its 1985 inception. He directed the Québec premiere of Monteverdi's L'Incoronazione di Poppea in 1984.

In 1987-1988, Labadie was an apprentice conductor with the Orchestre Symphonique de Québec. In 1989, he was appointed as the choral director of the Orchestra Symphonique de Québec, and held the post through 1995. Labadie was artistic director of the Opéra de Québec from 1994 to 2003, and served as artistic director for the Opéra de Montréal from 2002 to 2006. He made his Metropolitan Opera debut during the 2009–2010 season with Mozart's Die Zauberflöte, a work he also led at the Cincinnati Opera in 2011. He made his conducting debut with the Canadian Opera Company in 2017.

In 2014, Labadie was diagnosed with Stage 4 lymphoma. His subsequent medical treatment included a medically induced coma for one month.

In May 2017, the Orchestra of St. Luke's (OSL) announced the appointment of Labadie as its next principal conductor, effective with the 2018–2019 season. The appointment was unusual in that Labadie had not conducted the OSL prior to his appointment. His conducting debut with the orchestra was in July 2017. In March 2022, the orchestra announced the extension of Labadie's contract as principal conductor through the 2024-2025 season. In February 2024, OSL announced that Labadie is to stand down as its principal conductor at the close of the 2024-2025 season.

In October 2025, Les Violons du Roy announced the re-appointment of Labadie as its next music director, effective with the 2026-2027 season.

== Selected discography ==
- Mozart: Flute Concerto: Flute and Harp Concerto; Andante in C (1989)
- Pergolesi: Stabat Mater; Vivaldi: Motet "In furore guistissimae irae"; Stabat Mater (1994)
- Bach: Secular Cantatas (1994)
- Music of Bach's Sons (1996)
- Bach: Goldberg Variations (2000)
- Bach: Art of the Fugue (2001)

== Honours and awards ==
- Sir Ernest MacMillan Memorial Foundation Young Musician Award (1987)
- Officer of the Order of Canada (2005)
- Chevalier de l’Ordre National du Québec (2006)
- Samuel de Champlain award (2016)

Cultural offices
Preceded by no predecessor	Music Director, Les Violons du Roy; 1984–2014	Succeeded by Jonathan Cohen
Preceded by Pablo Heras-Casado	Principal Conductor, Orchestra of St. Luke's; 2018–2025	Succeeded by (post vacant)
Preceded by Jonathan Cohen	Music Director, Les Violons du Roy; 2026–present	Succeeded by incumbent
