= Chor Leoni Men's Choir =

Canadian choir

Chor Leoni

Background information
- Origin: Vancouver, British Columbia
- Genre: Classical music
- Years active: 1992 - Present
- Website: Official website

Chor Leoni is a low voice choir based in Vancouver, British Columbia, Canada. The group was founded as Chor Leoni Men's Choir in 1992 by Order of Canada recipient Diane Loomer, C.M. (1940 - 2012), and consists of up to 70 TTBB singers. In 2024, the choir announced their official name change, from Chor Leoni Men's Choir to Chor Leoni Choral Society. While primarily focused on performing classical choral repertoire, Chor Leoni (meaning "choir of lions") sings music of all genres and time periods, and in many different languages. In recent years, the group has commissioned original choral pieces from Ēriks Ešenvalds, Rodney Sharman and others. Since 2013, the group has hosted and participated in The Big Roar, a gathering of lower voice singers from Vancouver and around the world, featuring international choirs such as Chanticleer (ensemble) and Iceland's Karlakórinn Heimir, as well as the organization's professional group, The Leonids, since 2022.

The American choral conductor Erick Lichte (pronounced "light") is the group's artistic director and conductor.

== Achievements ==
- 1994 - Best Community Choir, CBC/Radio-Canada National Radio Competition for Amateur Choirs
- 1994 - 1st Prize, Equal Voice (Male), CBC/Radio-Canada National Radio Competition for Amateur Choirs
- 1996 - 2nd Prize, Equal Voice (Male), CBC/Radio-Canada National Radio Competition for Amateur Choirs
- 1998 - 2nd Prize, Equal Voice (Male), CBC/Radio-Canada National Radio Competition for Amateur Choirs
- 2002 - 1st Prize, Equal Voice (Male), CBC/Radio-Canada National Radio Competition for Amateur Choirs
- 2002 - 1st Prize, Contemporary - CBC/Radio-Canada National Radio Competition for Amateur Choirs
- 2002 - Best Performance of a Canadian Work - CBC/Radio-Canada National Radio Competition for Amateur Choirs
- 2003 - 4th Place, European Broadcasting Union's "Let the Peoples Sing" International Choral Competition
- 2004 - National Choral Award for Outstanding Choral Recording ("Yuletide Fires"), Association of Canadian Choral Conductors
- 2004 - Western Canadian Music Awards, Outstanding Classical Recording ("Yuletide Fires"), Western Canadian Music Alliance
- 2006 - 1st Prize, Equal Voice (Male), CBC/Radio-Canada National Radio Competition for Amateur Choirs

== Notable performances and tours ==
- 1997 - Atlantic Provinces Tour
- 2000 - Association of Canadian Choral Conductors’ PODIUM 2000
- 2000 - International Society of Music Educators’ 2000 Convention
- 2002 - Regional conference of the American Choral Directors Association, Tacoma, WA
- 2002 - Canadian representative, AmericaFest World Festival of Singing for Boys and Men, Collegeville, MN
- 2002 - Sixth World Symposium on Choral Music, Minneapolis, MN
- 2007 - Central Canada Tour, performances and workshops in Montreal, Lachute, Quebec City, Ottawa, Kitchener
- 2007 - Stratford Summer Music Festival, Stratford, Ontario
- 2008 - Invited guest choir, NW Division Convention, American Choral Directors' Association, Vancouver, British Columbia, Canada
- 2008 - Invited guest choir, Western Division Convention, American Choral Directors' Association, Anaheim, CA.
- 2008 - Host Choir, 2nd International Boys & Men's Choral Festival, Hradec Králové/Prague, Czech Republic
- 2009 - Canadian representative and International Guest Choir, 50th National Convention, American Choral Directors' Association, Oklahoma City, Oklahoma

== Recordings ==
- Songs of War and Peace - Skylark Records Cat. No. 9501
- L'Hymne au Printemps - Out of print.
- Canadian Safari - Cypress Choral Recordings Cat. No. CCR0603
- Canadian Safari 2 - Cypress Choral Recordings Cat. No. CCR0401
- Goin’ Home - Cypress Choral Recordings Cat. No. 0701
- Chor Leoni - Cypress Choral Recordings Cat. No. CCR0604
- Yuletide Fires - Cypress Choral Recordings Cat. No. CCR0601
- Carols & Lullabies: Christmas in the Southwest - Cypress Choral Recordings Cat. No. 0703
- Healing Voices - Cypress Choral Recordings Cat. No. 0602
- Circle of Compassion - Cypress Choral Recordings Cat. No. 0702
- Meetin' Here Tonight - Cypress Choral Recordings Cat. No. 0901

== Bibliography ==
- Dykk, Lloyd. "A niche choir grows into a tradition," The Vancouver Sun, 5 Nov 2005
- Duke, David Gordon. "Choir to perform Whitman set to music," The Vancouver Sun, 9 Nov 2006
- Mazey, Steven. "Prize-winning Vancouver men's choir makes Ottawa debut," The Ottawa Citizen, 16 Aug 2007
- Ariaratnam, Daniel. "Choir mixes Hockey Night into repertoire: Chor Leoni Men's Choir closes Stratford Summer Music Festival," The Record (Kitchener), 21 Aug 2007
- Duke, David Gordon. " Young 'lions' add their voices to choir's tribute. . ." The Vancouver Sun, 8 Nov 2007
