= Opéra de Montréal =

Opera company based in Montreal, Quebec

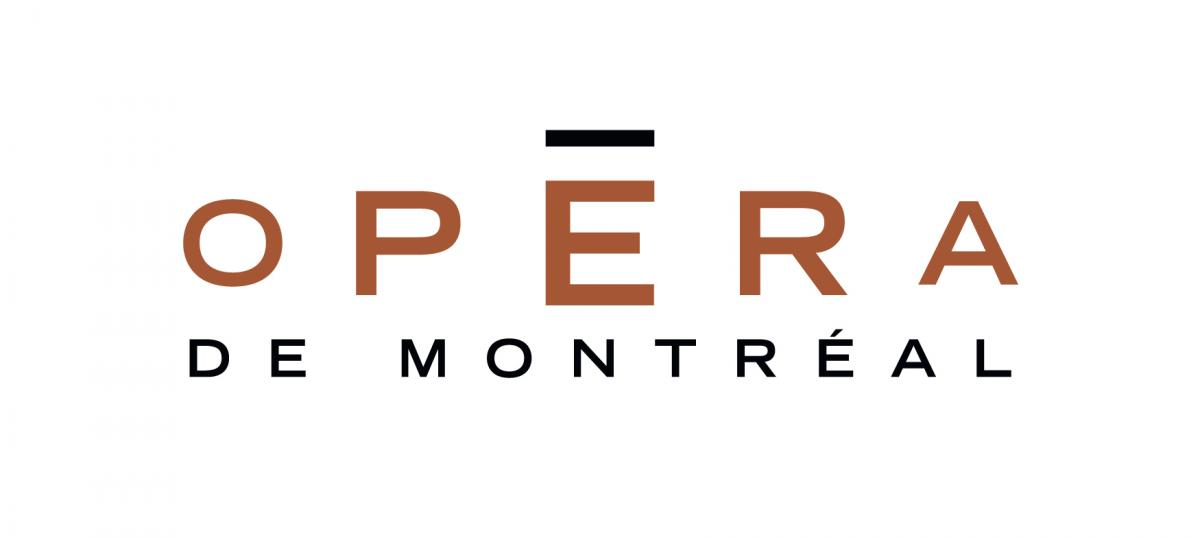
- Predecessor: Opéra de Québec
- Founded: 1980
- Founder: Jean-Paul Jeannotte
- Location: 260 boul. de Maisonneuve W. Montreal, Quebec
- Key people: Jean-Pierre Primiani; Michel Beaulac
- Website: operademontreal.com

L'Opéra de Montréal (French pronunciation: [ɔpeʁa də mɔ̃ʁeal]) is an opera company in Montreal, Canada. It performs at the Place des Arts theatre complex in downtown Montreal, in the borough of Ville-Marie. It was founded in 1980 as a company focused on productions in French.

== History ==
Before the Opéra de Montréal was established in 1980 there had been a number of previous attempts to establish an opera company in the city. L'Opéra français de Montréal operated from 1893 to 1896, and gave almost 600 performances, principally of operetta. The Montreal Opera Company was started in 1910 by Albert Clerk-Jeannotte with financing from Frank S. Meighen, and ran for three years. The Société Canadienne d'Opérette was started by Honoré Vaillancourt in 1921, and gave some 300 performances in the following ten years. Another light opera company, the Variétés Lyriques, was established in 1936, and between then and 1955 gave more than 1000 performances; 13 of the 83 works presented were serious operas. From 1942 until 1950, the Opera Guild of Montreal gave two performances of each of two productions per year, and then until 1959 mounted only one annual production; the artistic director was Pauline Donalda. Another professional opera company, the Opéra du Québec (i.e. the province), operated in Montreal from 1971 to 1975. A different company Opéra de Québec (i.e. the city) was founded in Québec City in 1983.

The company was established in 1980 by the Ministère des Affaires culturelles du Québec, five years after the closure of the Opéra du Québec. Jean-Paul Jeannotte was director until 1989, when Bernard Uzan took over. In 1988, bilingual supertitles were introduced. In 1989, the Opéra's finances stabilized. Jacqueline Desmarais founded the Montréal Opera Guild to support the Opéra through fundraising and special events like the Gala and the Signature Event. The Opéra also received the Félix Award for the most popular show of the season, Nelligan, a romantic opera by André Gagnon based on a book by Michel Tremblay. In 1997–1998, two Opus Awards were given for the production of Janáček's Jenůfa. In 2004, two Opus Awards were again given to the company for Bartók's Bluebeard's Castle. In 2007, the company cooperated with Opera Australia by presenting Lakmé by Delibes, and was rated as one of the 15 largest opera companies in North America. In 2008, an outdoor presentation of Puccini's Madame Butterfly attracted 33,000 listeners. In 2010 it received a Opus Award for a double bill of Leoncavallo's Pagliacci and Puccini's Gianni Schicchi directed by Alain Gauthier, and again in 2013 for Jake Heggie's Dead Man Walking. Performances are held at the Place des Arts theatre complex in downtown Montreal, in the borough of Ville-Marie.

== l'Atelier lyrique ==
Found in 1984, under the leadership of Yvonne Goudreau, the Atelier lyrique de l'Opéra de Montréal was created in order to promote the development of a national outreach. In 1990, Chantal Lambert was nominated the director of l'Atelier lyrique. In March 2023, Jennifer Szeto was appointed as the new director of the Atelier, having previously worked with the company as artist in residence in 2012.

== Artistic directors ==
- Jean-Paul Jeannotte (1980–1989)
- Bernard Uzan (1989–2001)
- Bernard Labadie (2002–2006)
- Michel Beaulac (2006–present)

== General directors ==
- Jacques Langevin (1983–1986)
- Bernard S. Creighton (1986–1988)
- Bernard Uzan (1988–2000)
- Kimberly J. Gaynor (2001–2002)
- David Moss (2003–2006)
- Pierre Dufour (2006–2016)
- Patrick Corrigan (2016–2025)
- Jean-Pierre Primiani (2025–present)

== Atelier lyrique directors ==
- Yvonne Goudreau (1984–1990)
- Chantal Lambert (1990–2023)
- Jennifer Szeto (2023–present)
