= Serge Turgeon =

Canadian actor (1946–2004)

Serge Turgeon CM CQ (12 March 1946 – 18 May 2004) was a Quebec actor and union leader.

He was the president of the Union des artistes from 1985 to 1997.

In 2001, he was made a Knight of the National Order of Quebec. In 2003, he was made a Member of the Order of Canada.
