= Jean-Paul Jeannotte =

Canadian singer (1926–2021)

Jean-Paul Jeannotte OC
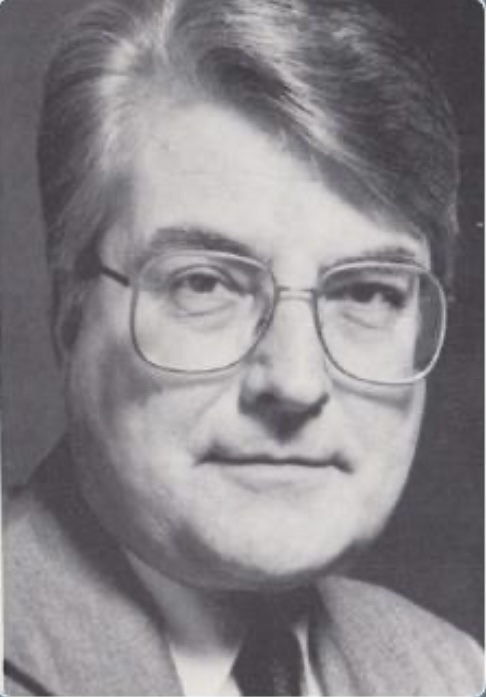
- Born: 9 March 1926; Rawdon, Quebec, Canada
- Died: 9 September 2021 (aged 95)
- Occupations: Operatic tenor; Academic teacher; Opera administrator
- Organisations: Union des artistes; Opéra de Montréal; Laval University; École de musique Vincent-d'Indy

Jean-Paul Jeannotte OC (French pronunciation: [ʒɑ̃ pɔl ʒanɔt]; 9 March 1926 – 9 September 2021) was a Canadian operatic tenor, academic teacher, and opera administrator. He founded the Opéra de Montréal in 1979 and was its artistic director until 1989.

== Career ==
Born in Rawdon, Jeannotte studied singing in Montreal, with Salvator Issaurel in 1944 and with Émile Gourthe the following two years. He then continued his studies in Paris, with d'Estainville Rousset from 1947 and Pierre Bernac from 1951 to 1953. He made his operatic debut in Cherbourg in 1947 as Vincent in Gounod's Mireille. He also appeared there as Piféar in Adam's Si j'étais roi. He performed as Bastien in Mozart's Bastien et Bastienne, and as the Narrator in Monteverdi's Il combattimento di Tancredi e Clorinda with the Minute Opera in 1949, and toured withFrance with the Disciples de Massenet in 1950.

He first appeared in Montreal at the Variétés lyriques in 1954 as Fritellini in Audran's La Mascotte, and remained a frequent performer with the company until 1955. He made many appearances on stage, radio and TV. In recitals, he performed art songs in French, German and Italian with excellent diction and understanding on tours in Canada and a tour of Europe and the USSR with pianist Jeanne Landry in 1961. He performed with orchestras and chamber music groups, cofounding the Ensemble Jean-Philippe-Rameau in 1954.

In opera, Jeanotte was known for the role of Pelléas in Debussy's Pelléas et Mélisande, which he sang in a concert performance of the CBC alongside Suzanne Danco in 1955 and in another of the ORTF alongside Gérard Souzay as Golaud. Other roles included Gonzalve in Ravel's L'Heure espagnole, Basilio in Mozart's The Marriage of Figaro at the 1956 Montreal Festivals, and Bobino in Maurice Blackburn's Silent Measures. He appeared as Bobino more than 100 times, in the world premiere on CBC TV, on stage in Toronto and Montreal, on a Canada tour in 1961/61 and in other productions.

Jeannotte taught at Laval University (1964–1979) and at the École de musique Vincent-d'Indy. He was president of the Union des artistes from 1966 to 1972. In 1979, he founded the Opéra de Montréal, of which he was artistic director until 1989.

Jeannotte was named an officer of the Order of Canada in 1987. He died at age 95.
