= Josée Yvon =

Josée Yvon (1950 – June 12, 1994) was a Quebec poet, playwright and screenwriter. Her work relates largely to marginalised groups in society.

== Biography ==
Josée Yvon was born, lived and died in Montreal in a popular neighborhood on Ontario Street.

In 1971, she obtained a bachelor's degree in theater studies from Université du Québec à Montréal. She then began a master's degree on Bertolt Brecht at Schauspielhaus of Düsseldorf, (Germany), but did not complete her studies. She started her professional career as a director, with the Théâtre sans fil and the Grand Circus Ordinaire, an occasional screenwriter for Radio-Québec, a waitress and a translator. Also, she taught literature at Rosemont College, Bois-de-Boulogne College and Cégep Édouard-Montpetit.

Josée participated regularly in meetings where she read her texts like at the Solstice of Poetry in 1976, the Night of St. John in 1978 and The Night of Poetry of 1980. She was also a literary critic and collaborates notably at Mainmise, Hobo-Quebec, La Barre du jour, Cul-Q, Witches (Paris), Beatitude (California), Sisters (Los Angeles), Ironie Point (Germany), Stars Screwers (France), and many others.

The publishing of her first book, Filles-commandos bandées, in 1976. made her one of the major authors in the Quebec poetry movement of the 1980s, marked by the Beat Generation, that developed around Red Herbs. And that's where she met Denis Vanier, her companion for the next eighteen years.

Her work was highly influenced by the American lesbian and revolutionary literature. The description of marginality has a major role in it: homosexuals, drug addicts, prostitutes, transsexuals, or transvestites are recurrent characters.

She died in June 1994 after a long struggle with AIDS, almost blind, leaving Manon la nuit, an unfinished manuscript on blindness.

Yvon's archival fonds is kept in the Montreal archives center of Bibliothèque et Archives nationales du Québec.

== Filmography ==
- La Nuit de la poésie 27 mars 1970, 1971.
- Vanier présente son Show de monstres, coscenario with Denis Vanier, 1974.

== Bibliography ==
- Filles-commandos bandées, 1976.
- La Chienne de l'hôtel Tropicana, 1977.
- Travesties-kamikaze, 1980.
- Koréphilie, with Denis Vanier, 1981.
- Danseuse-mamelouk – récit, 1976.
- Gogo-boy, 1983.
- L'âme/défigurée, with Denis Vanier, 1984.
- Maîtresses-Cherokees – récit, 1986.
- Filles-missiles, 1986.
- Travaux pratiques – œuvres critiques complètes, with Denis Vanier, 1987.
- Les Laides otages – récit, 1990.
- La Cobaye – récit, 1993.
- Lettres, 1994.

== Awards and honors ==
- 1969 : Youth authors prize of la Nouvelle Compagnie théâtrale du Centre d'essais des auteurs dramatiques, for L'Invention.
