= Union des artistes =

Canadian actors guild

- Abbreviation: UDA
- Formation: 1937; 89 years ago
- Founder: René Bertrand
- Type: Trade union
- Headquarters: Montreal, Quebec, Canada
- Location: Canada
- Members: 6,900
- Official language: French
- President: Tania Kontoyanni
- Director general: Alexandre Curzi
- Affiliations: International Federation of Actors
- Website: uda.ca
- Formerly called: Fédération des artistes de la radio (1937–1942); Union des artistes lyriques et dramatiques (1942–1952)

The Union des artistes (UDA; literally "Union of Artists") is a Quebec-based labour organization representing stage, television, radio, and film performers in French-language media in Canada. (The English-language labour organization is the Alliance of Canadian Cinema, Television and Radio Artists.) It represents over 6,900 members and is affiliated with the International Federation of Actors (FIA). The current president is Tania Kontoyanni.

The UDA was founded in 1937 by the singer René Bertrand. It has been recognized under Quebec law since 1987 and under federal law since 1992.

== Presidents ==
- 1937–1939: René Bertrand
- 1939–1941: Eddy Beaudry
- 1941–1954: Gérard Delage
- 1954–1955: Louis Bélanger
- 1955–1957: Mia Riddez
- 1957–1960: Jean Duceppe
- 1960–1962: Bertrand Gagnon
- 1962–1966: Pierre Boucher
- 1966–1972: Jean-Paul Jeannotte
- 1972–1974: Robert Rivard
- 1974–1975: Jean Brousseau
- 1975–1980: Robert Rivard
- 1980–1983: Louise Deschâtelets
- 1983–1984: Yves Létourneau
- 1984–1985: Nicole Picard
- 1985–1997: Serge Turgeon
- 1997–2007: Pierre Curzi
- 2007–2013: Raymond Legault
- 2013–2023: Sophie Prégent
- 2023–present: Tania Kontoyanni
