= Peter Elyakim Taussig =

Peter Elyakim Taussig (born 1944) is a Czechoslovak-Israeli-Canadian-American author, composer, pianist, and video and performance artist.

== Concert pianist and recording artist ==
Peter Elyakim Taussig was born in Nazi-occupied Czechoslovakia, and grew up in Israel, where he studied with Czech pianist, Edith Kraus - a student of Artur Schnabel. After serving in the Israeli army during the Six-Day War, Taussig moved to Canada in 1968 and earned his master's degree at the University of Toronto, studying with Anton Kuerti.

In 1973, Taussig began a long relationship with the Canadian Broadcasting Corporation, where among other things he became a friend and occasional collaborator with pianist Glenn Gould. Over the next decade, Taussig recorded over 200 chamber music broadcasts for the CBC - including the complete piano chamber music works of Beethoven, Schubert, Mendelssohn, Schumann, and Brahms. He gave frequent concerts, both as a soloist - with such conductors as Sir Andrew Davis, John Eliot Gardiner, the late Erich Kunzel and Arthur Fiedler, and with his innovative music ensemble, Camerata-Canada.

In 1979, Taussig founded the Stratford Summer Music Festival in Ontario and became its first artistic director.

== Video and performance artist ==
Starting in 1982, Taussig established a second career as a video and performance artist. He was member of the artist cooperatives Ed Video in Guelph and Charles Street Video in Toronto. His video opera “Catatonics” was featured at the video section of the Montreal World Film Festival and the Images Festival of Toronto in 1991. His performance piece “My Memorial Service” at the Toronto Music Gallery in 1990 caused a stir as a rumor spread that he died. His best known performance work was the satirical piano recital “Taussig and Enemies”, with which he toured small town Canada for several years in the 1980s (excerpts on Video on YouTube).

== Music technology ==
After moving to the United States, Taussig developed a technology tool at the Yamaha Corporation, Musical Sculpting. Using the company's Disklavier-PRO computer-driven concert grand, the application allowed handicapped pianists to record with minimal use of their fingers. To demonstrate the potential inherent in this novel recording technique Taussig released two albums created entirely without the use of fingers, Bach's The Art of Fugue, (2001) and The Well-Tempered Clavier, book 1 (2002).

In 2007 he collaborated with Dr. E. Paul Goldenberg of the Education Development Center (EDC) of Waltham, Massachusetts in the development of a math through music curriculum and they launched a pilot program at an elementary school in Ohio.

== Author and composer ==
Since 2009 Taussig has devoted himself exclusively to writing and composition. His first book, “The Atheist’s Guide to Miracles” was published in summer 2012. Over the next seven years he has published four novels, two memoirs, two poetry and short story collections, and one translation from the German, his father's holocaust era memoir, "Man Without a Shadow, The Jew Who Would Not be Caught".

The list of his compositions includes an opera (Fibonacci), a requiem Let There Be War, an oratorio (Eve of Life), three symphonies, and concertos for Bagpipe and Orchestra, steel pan, and Peruvian panpipes. His ballet “Three Dubious Memories” was choreographed by Paul Taylor in 2011 and toured extensively by the Paul Taylor Dance Company. His current CD projects include “101 Sound-bite Symphonies - a celebration of short attention span”, and the electronic CD "Musica Sacra Nuova - Thirteen Urban Rituals" (2014).

== Personal life ==
In 1998 Taussig suffered an injury to his right hand which ended his concert career. He was married to Canadian concert pianist Kathryn Taussig, née Root (d. 2015). He has one daughter, Elena Sachi Taussig, and lives in Colrain, Massachusetts with artist Linda Baker-Cimini.
