= Orchestra of St. Luke's =

Orchestra in New York City

- chamber orchestra
- Founded: 1974
- Location: New York City, US
- Principal conductor: Bernard Labadie
- Website: oslmusic.org

The Orchestra of St. Luke's (OSL) is an American chamber orchestra based in New York City, formed in 1974. The orchestra performs at several venues in New York City, including Carnegie Hall, Caramoor Center for Music and the Arts, Saint Thomas Church (Manhattan), Congregation Emanu-El of New York, and Merkin Concert Hall.

OSL owns and operates the DiMenna Center for Classical Music, and is administratively located at 450 West 37th Street in Manhattan's Hell's Kitchen neighborhood. OSL is the orchestra for Paul Taylor Dance Company.

== History ==
The core of the orchestra is the St. Luke's Chamber Ensemble, which was founded in 1974 as an ensemble of 21 to 22 musicians. It is named for the Church of St. Luke in the Fields, Greenwich Village, in Manhattan, where the ensemble first performed. Michael Feldman, a music teacher in Manhattan, was the first de facto conductor of the ensemble. The larger Orchestra of St. Luke's was formally founded in the summer of 1979 at the Caramoor International Music Festival in Katonah, New York, as the festival's resident orchestra.

In the 1984/85 season, Carnegie Hall invited the orchestra to perform as part of a Handel Opera Festival, conducted by Charles Mackerras, Raymond Leppard, and John Nelson, and which featured performers including Marilyn Horne, June Anderson, Tatiana Troyanos and Kathleen Battle. In the 1986/87 season Carnegie Hall began presenting the orchestra in an annual subscription series, which continues to this day.

The organization of the orchestra's musicians falls into a three-tier roster, with the second tier of 20 players utilized for chamber orchestra concerts, and the third tier of 20 to 30 musicians for use in concerts that require larger ensembles. The pool of musicians for the orchestra generally derives from freelance New York City musicians. The orchestra musicians themselves decide on the hiring and dismissal, and assignments, of the players, without a central music director.

The orchestra's first titled conductor was Roger Norrington, the music director from 1990 to 1994. Sir Charles Mackerras was the orchestra's second music director, from 1998 to 2001, but with limited administrative work and only for the designated 3-year period, per his request. Donald Runnicles was the orchestra's next titled conductor, with the title of principal conductor, from 2001 to 2007. In December 2011, the orchestra announced the appointment of its current principal conductor, Pablo Heras-Casado, with immediate effect, and with an initial contract through 2015 and an extension through September 2017. Heras-Casado concluded his principal conductorship of the orchestra at the close of the 2018–2019 season, and subsequently took the title of conductor laureate, the first conductor ever named conductor laureate of the orchestra.

In May 2014, OSL, with the Choral Arts Society of Washington and the Krakow Philharmonic Choir, under the direction of Gilbert Levine, made its public television concert debut performing at DAR Constitution Hall in Washington D.C., a programme titled 'A Celebration of Peace Through Music'.

In May 2017, the orchestra announced the appointment of Bernard Labadie as its next principal conductor, effective with the 2018–2019 season. The appointment was unusual in that Labadie had not conducted the orchestra prior to his appointment. His conducting debut with the orchestra was in July 2017. In March 2022, the orchestra announced the extension of Labadie's contract as principal conductor through the 2024–2025 season. In February 2024, OSL announced that Labadie is to stand down as its principal conductor at the close of the 2024–2025 season.

The orchestra announced a Bach Festival in June 2019, as well as the first edition in July 2019 of an annual Composition Institute. Composer Anna Clyne has served as the Mentor Composer for the Composition Institute since its inception in 2019.

Orchestra of St. Luke's has premiered more than 100 orchestral and chamber works by such composers as John Adams, Joan Tower, Gabriela Lena Frank, Valerie Coleman, Anthony Davis, Nicholas Maw, André Previn, George Tsontakis, Bryce Dessner, Ellen Taaffe Zwilich and Alma Deutscher. The orchestra has appeared on more than 100 recordings, four of which have won Grammy Awards: John Adams's Nixon in China, Samuel Barber's Knoxville: Summer of 1915, Listen to the Storyteller with Wynton Marsalis, and Bel Canto with Renée Fleming. In 2003, the orchestra launched its own record label, St. Luke's Collection.

In 2015, James Roe, who had been CEO of the New Jersey Symphony since 2013, was appointed the orchestra's president and executive director. Since 2024 the chair of the board of directors is Emme Levin Deland.

== Music directors and principal conductors ==
- Roger Norrington (1990–1994; music director)
- Sir Charles Mackerras (1998–2001; music director)
- Donald Runnicles (2001–2007; principal conductor)
- Pablo Heras-Casado (2011–2017; principal conductor)
- Bernard Labadie (2017–2025; principal conductor)

== See also ==
- A Carnegie Hall Christmas Concert
- The Rossini Bicentennial Birthday Gala
