= Stratford Summer Music Festival =

Canadian music festival

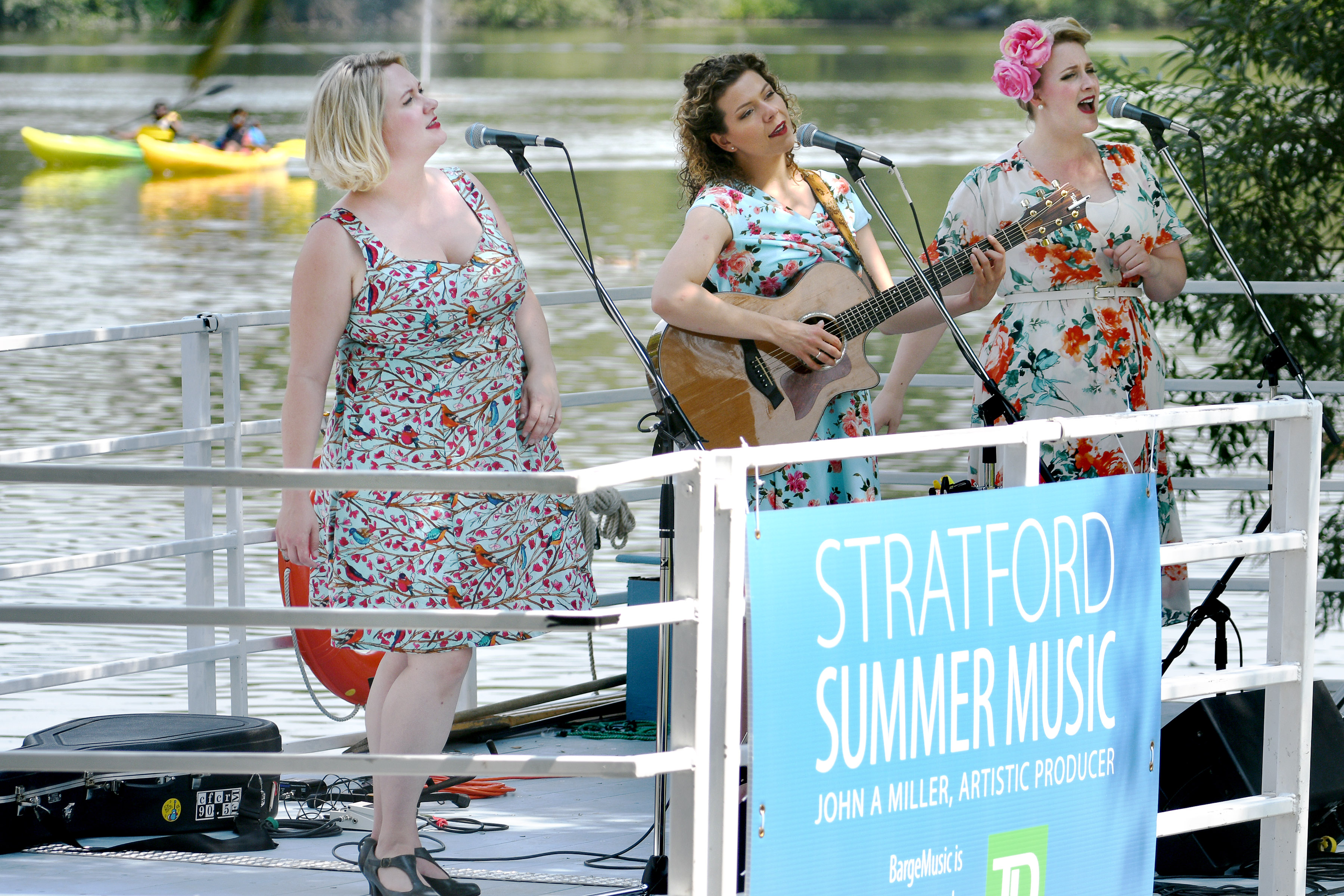
Artists performing on The Stratford Belle.

Stratford Summer Music is a nonprofit organization hosting an annual festival which spans several weeks, set in both indoor and outdoor venues throughout the downtown core of Canada’s Shakespearean capital, Stratford, Ontario. Local, provincial, national and international artists across a wide range of genres perform.

== Artistic Direction ==
Mark Fewer is the current artistic director of Stratford Summer Music. He has performed around the world in halls such as Carnegie Hall, Wigmore Hall and Salle Pleyel, and in recital venues such as Bartok House (Budapest) to Le Poisson Rouge (New York City) to The Forum (Taipei). As a conductor he has directed Musici de Montreal, l’Orchestre Symphonique de Laval, the Newfoundland Sinfonia, the McGill Baroque Orchestra and the choir Capella Antica. His current focus is on bringing live music to the Stratford community and surrounding area, and on finding different ways to present performances.

== Community involvement ==
Stratford Summer Music is involved in music education programs for youth in local communities and has facilitated mentorships between established and aspiring musicians in the past.

In 2019 Stratford Summer Music's artistic director Mark Fewer introduced an award with the intention of shining an annual spotlight on the existing body of work and achievement of local music teachers. Mark McIntosh, a teacher at Avon public school was last year's recipient. This year the award was given to Colleen Rothwell, a Stratford native and teacher at Shakespeare public school.

== History ==
Stratford Summer Music was founded by pianist Peter Elyakim Taussig, the first residing artistic director. The original festival operated in Stratford from 1980 to 1984 under the general management of John A. Miller, who went on to become the National Director of the Canadian Music Centre, found his own arts management company and serve as the executive manager of the foundation promoting the artistry and ideas of Canadian musical icon Glenn Gould.

In 2001, John A. Miller resurrected the Stratford Summer Music festival and served as its artistic producer until his retirement in 2018. Performances have been given by Chor Leoni Men's Choir, the Duke Ellington Orchestra, l'Orchestre de la Francophone Canadienne, the National Youth Orchestra, the Phil Nimmons Jazz Quartet, the St. Lawrence String Quartet, the Vancouver Bach Choir, Measha Brueggergosman, James Ehnes, Ronnie Hawkins, David Jalbert, Jean-Pierre Leguay, and Ashley MacIsaac, among others. In recent years, Stratford Summer Music has expanded the duration of the festival to six weeks.

In its 2011 survey of North American summer music festivals, the British music journal, Gramophone, named Stratford Summer Music one of the top festivals on the continent.

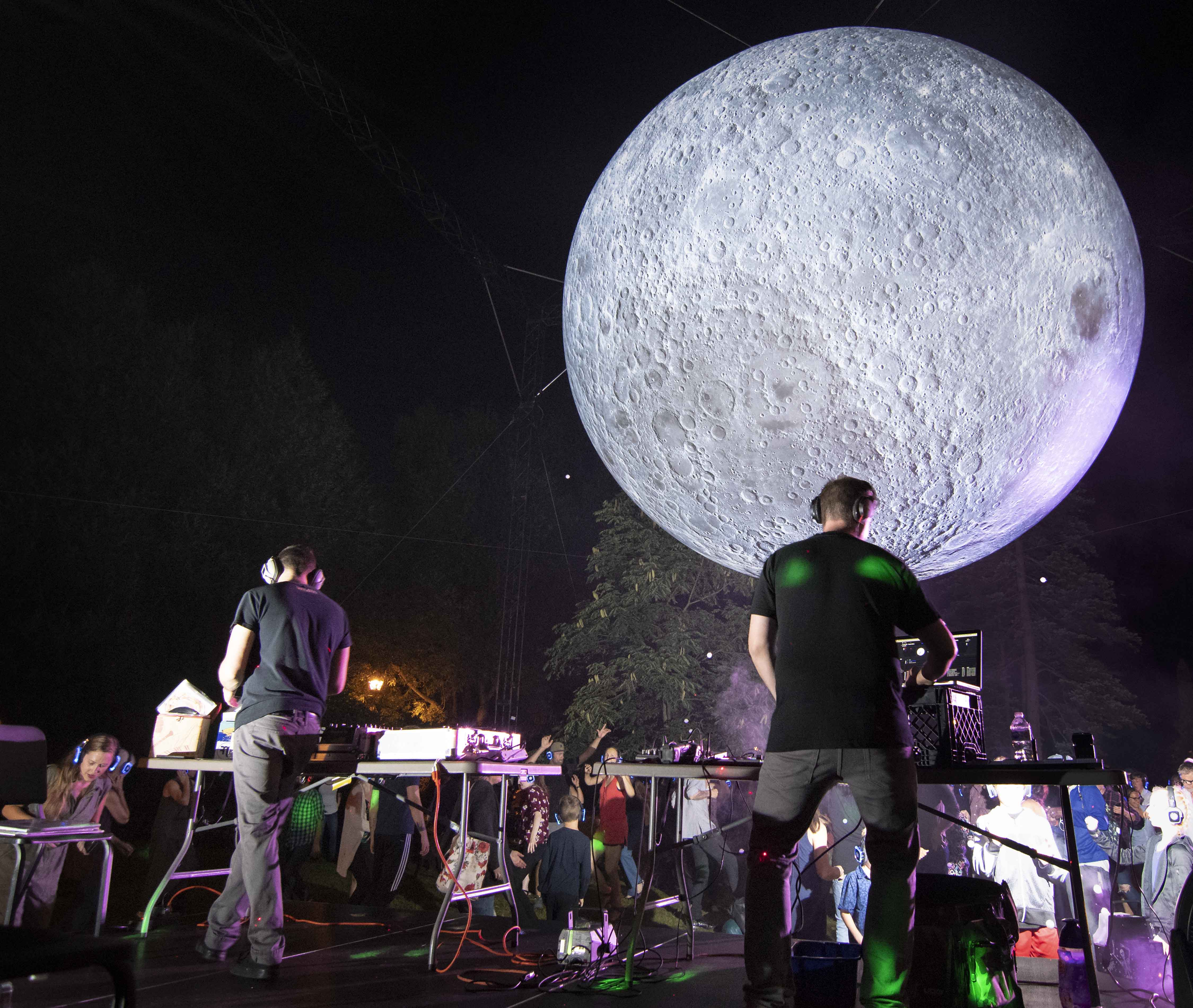
Artists perform for an excited group under the Museum of the Moon installation on Tom Patterson Island.

The festival's 2014 line up included a TorQ Percussion Quartet residency on Tom Patterson Island, renamed – “Tom Percussion Island”. The goal of this installation was to show young people that music was fun, and encouraged visitors to play percussion instruments, including a large drum made from the trunk of a hollowed-out tree, a labyrinth of gongs, and a dinosaur made out of musical instruments for the kids to explore.

In 2018 the Museum of the Moon, an exhibit created by UK artist Luke Jerram, was installed. A custom built balloon - seven metres in diameter, using detailed NASA imagery was suspended on Tom Patterson island under which many concerts and events took place during the duration of the festival.

== Notable Performances ==
- The Canadian Arabic Orchestra and Choir performed at the opening of the 16th season of Stratford Summer Music(2016)
- A 13-year-old Jazz pianist Joey Alexander played to a full house (2016)
- Mobile Homme, Les Tambours/The Drummers by Transe Express, France, flew over Stratford Market Square (2017)
- Canada's National Youth Orchestra and National Youth Choir of Canada sang with Lt.-Gov Elizabeth Dowdeswell in attendance (2017)
