= Pablo Heras-Casado =

Spanish conductor (born 1977)

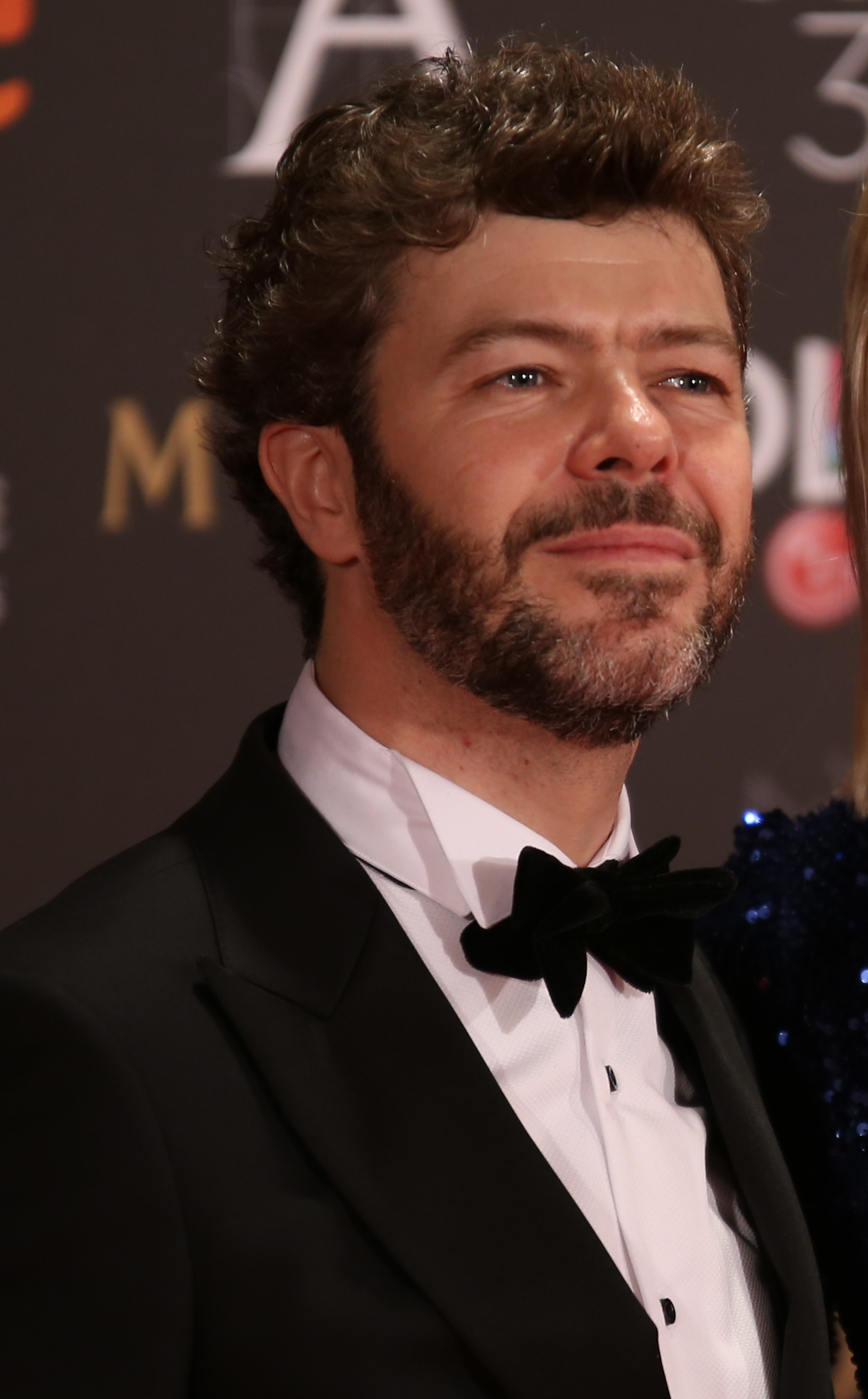
- Born: 21 November 1977 (age 48)
- Education: Universidad de Granada Real Conservatorio Superior de Música de Granada
- Occupation: conductor
- Years active: 1994–present
- Spouse: Anne Igartiburu
- Children: Nicolás Heras Igartiburu (2016)
- Website: Pabloherascasado.com

Pablo Heras-Casado (born 21 November 1977) is a Spanish conductor.

== Early life ==
The son of a retired police officer, he began singing with a school choir at the age of seven and piano lessons at the age of nine. He studied music at the conservatory in Granada. He later attended the Universidad de Granada, concentrating on art history and acting. He studied conducting further at the Universidad de Alcalá de Henares. His conducting teachers have included Harry Christophers and Christopher Hogwood.

== Career ==
In the mid-1990s, Heras-Casado participated in the founding of the early music ensemble Capella Exaudi. At the Universidad de Granada, he helped found the ensemble SONÓORA, with a focus on modernist and avant-garde music. In 2000/01, he was an assistant conductor with the Joven Orquesta Nacional de España. He founded the Barroca de Granada Orchestra in 2002. In 2004, he established an "International Choral Conducting Masterclass" in Valle de Ricote (Murcia). In 2006/07, he was an assistant conductor with the Opéra de Paris. In 2007, Heras-Casado cofounded La Compañía Teatro del Principe, a period instrument ensemble based in Aranjuez, Spain which focuses on neglected operas of the Spanish baroque era. His work in contemporary music has included conducting the world premieres of Marc-Olivier Dupin's ballet Les enfants du paradis for Opéra National de Paris (2008) and of the opera Matsukaze by Toshio Hosokawa (2011).

Outside of Spain, Heras-Casado made his US debut in June 2008 with the Ensemble ACJW at Carnegie Hall, New York. His UK debut followed in August 2008 with the National Youth Orchestra of Great Britain. Heras-Casado first conducted the Orchestra of St. Luke's in the summer of 2011. In December 2011, the orchestra announced the appointment of Heras-Casado as its principal conductor, with immediate effect, and with an initial contract through 2015. In May 2014, the orchestra announced the extension of his contract through the 2016/17 season. He made his debut at the Metropolitan Opera in New York in 2013 conducting Michael Mayer's production of Rigoletto. In September 2014, he was appointed the next principal guest conductor of the Teatro Real in Madrid, with an initial contract of three seasons over the period 2015–2018. In the 2016 season he debuted with the Vienna Philharmonic, the Swedish Radio Symphony Orchestra, the Israel Philharmonic Orchestra and at the Melk Barocktage.

Heras-Casado's honours have included winning the Lucerne Festival Conductors' Competition in 2007. He received the "Critical Eye" prize of Radio Clásica, part of RTVE, in November 2010. He has conducted commercial recordings for the harmonia mundi, Decca Classics, and Deutsche Grammophon labels. He will also become the Orchestra of St. Luke's first Conductor Laureate, a new position created for him, starting in the 2017/18 season.

Musical America's 2014 Conductor of the Year, Pablo Heras-Casado holds the Medalla de Honor of the Rodriguez Acosta Foundation and the Ambassador Award of the Regional Government of Andalusia. He is an Honorary Ambassador and recipient of the Golden Medal of Merit by the Council of Granada, as well as an Honorary Citizen of the Province of Granada, his hometown. In 2017, Pablo Heras-Casado was appointed as Director of the Granada Festival, presenting his first edition of the festival in summer of 2018 with resounding success, reaching 92.7% occupancy and welcoming more than 45,000 audience members. In 2018 he is bestowed by the French Republic the Chevalier de l'Ordre des Arts et des Lettres as well as "Embajador Solidario 2019" by Fundación Ayuda en Acción.

The concert on 9 June 2019, marked his 1,000th career concert, conducting the Karajan-Akademie der Berliner Philharmoniker and soprano Nika Gorič at the Berliner Philharmonie.

== Awards and honours ==
- 2007 – Winner of the Lucerne Festival Conductor's Competition, Switzerland.
- 2010 – 'Critical Eye' award to the best classical music artist by Radio Clásica/RTVE, Spain
- 2011 – Medal of Honour by the Rodríguez Acosta Foundation, Spain
- 2011 – Diapason d'Or by the French music magazine Diapason for the recording of Kurt Weill's 'Rise and Fall of the City of Mahagonny'
- 2012 – Medal of Honour of the City of Granada, Spain
- 2013 – Musical America Conductor of the Year
- 2015 – Presse musicale internationale (PMI): Grand Prix Antoine Livio
- 2016 – Deutsche Schallplattenkritik Preis for "Mendelssohn: Symphonies 3 & 4" album on harmonia mundi
- 2016 – "Granada tourism Ambassador" Award from the City of Granada
- 2016 – "Andalucía Ambassador" Award from the Andalusian Government
- 2017 – Orchestra of St. Luke's first Conductor Laureate
- 2017 – Appointed Director of the Granada Festival
- 2018 – Named "Chevalier de l'ordre des Arts et des Lettres" of the French Republic
- 2018 – Awarded "Embajador Solidario 2019" by Fundación Ayuda en Acción
- 2019 – Conducts the 1000th concert of his career with the Karajan-Akademie der Berliner Philharmoniker
- 2019 – Diapason d'Or by the French music magazine Diapason for the recording of "Mendelssohn: Piano Concerto No. 2 & Symphony No. 1"
- 2024 – Artistic award of Gala Concert of the Teatro Real Awards (Madrid, Spain)
- 2024 – 'Conductor of the Year' by the opera magazine Opernwelt.
- 2024 – Bruckner No 4 at the Presto Music Awards 2024 Top 10 recordings of the year.
- 2024 – Ópera XXI Prize for Musical Direction: Pablo Heras-Casado, for conducting the opera Die Meistersinger von Nürnberg (The Master Singers of Nuremberg) by Wagner at the Teatro Real in April and May 2024.
- 2025 – The OPER! AWARD 2025 for Best Conductor of the Year.

== Recordings ==
- 2008 – Weihnachten in Europa. Glor Classics (Sono Music)
- 2009 – Puerto – Boreas, Fantasía Primera. Trito
- 2010 – Castel: La Fontana del Placer (Zarzuela in two acts, 1776). Compañía Teatro del Príncipe. World premiere recording. Música Antigua Aranjuez.
- 2010 – Boccherini: Clementina (Zarzuela in two acts). Compañía Teatro del Príncipe World premiere recording. Música Antigua Aranjuez
- 2011 – Weill: Rise and Fall of the City of Mahagonny (DVD). Teatro Real, Madrid
- 2011 – Schubert: Symphony No. 7 in B minor, "Unfinished" (DVD). Orchestre Philharmonique de Radio France. Les Clefs de l'Orchestre. Jean-François Zygel, Naïve Records
- 2011 – Rota: Trombone Concerto. Frederic Belli Plays Works By Berio, Rabe, Martin, Delerue & Rota. Hänssler Classic
- 2013 – Verdi: Baritone Arias. Plácido Domingo. Sony
- 2013 – Schubert: Symphonies Nos. 3 and 4. Freiburger Barockorchester. harmonia mundi
- 2014 – El Maestro Farinelli with Concerto Köln. Archiv
- 2014 – Mendelssohn: Symphony No. 2 "Lobgesang". Symphonieorchester des Bayerischen Rundfunks. harmonia mundi
- 2014 – Bonno: L'isola disabitata. World first recording. Compañía Teatro del Príncipe, Aranjuez. Maa Ediciones
- 2014 – Donizetti: L'elisir d'amore (Blu-ray & DVD). Deutsche Grammophon
- 2015 – Schumann : Violin Concerto, Isabelle Faust, Freiburger Barockorchester. harmonia mundi
- 2015 – Praetorius. Balthasar-Neumann-Chor und Ensemble. Archiv
- 2015 – Schumann: Piano Concerto, Piano Trio No. 2 with pianist Alexander Melnikov, cellist Jean-Guihen Queyras and violinist Isabelle Faust. harmonia mundi
- 2016 – Schumann: Cello Concerto, Piano Trio No. 1 with cellist Jean-Guihen Queyras, violinist Isabelle Faust, pianist Alexander Melnikov, and the Freiburger Barockorchester. harmonia mundi
- 2016 – Mendelssohn: Symphonies Nos. 3 & 4. Freiburger Barockorchester. harmonia mundi
- 2016 – Shostakovich: Cello Concertos Nos. 1 & 2 with cellist Alisa Weilerstein and the Bavarian Radio Symphony Orchestra. Decca Classics
- 2016 – Tchaikovsky: Symphony No. 1 and The Tempest with the Orchestra of St. Luke's. harmonia mundi
- 2016 – Verdi: La Traviata (DVD). C Major Entertainment
- 2016 – Sotelo: El Público (DVD). Naxos
- 2017 – Mendelssohn: Violin Concerto, Symphony No. 5, Hebrides Overture. With Isabelle Faust. harmonia mundi
- 2017 – Monteverdi: Selva morale e spirituale. With Balthasar Neumann Choir and Ensemble. harmonia mundi
- 2017 – Wagner: Der fliegende Holländer (DVD). Teatro Real de Madrid. harmonia mundi
- 2018 – Bartók: Concerto for Orchestra, Piano Concerto No. 3. With pianist Javier Perianes and Münchner Philharmoniker. harmonia mundi
- 2018 – Debussy: La Mer, Le Martyre de Saint Sébastien. With the Philharmonia Orchestra. harmonia mundi
- 2019 – Mendelssohn: Piano Concerto No. 2 & Symphony No. 1. harmonia mundi
- 2021 – Beethoven: Triple Concerto. With Isabelle Faust, Jean-Guihen Queyras, Alexander Melnikov, Freiburger Barockorchester
- 2021 – Stravinsky: Le Sacre du primtemps; Eötvös: "Alhambra" Concerto. With Isabelle Faust, Orchestre de Paris. harmonia mundi
- 2022 – Schumann: The Complete Symphonies. With Münchner Philarmoniker. Harmonia Mundi.
- 2022 – Arnulf Herrmann: Three Songs at the Open Window; Tour de Trance. With Symphonieorchester des Bayerischen Rundfunks & Anja Petersen. BR Klassik.
- 2023 – Schubert: Symphonies Nº5 & 7 "Unfinished". With Freiburger Barockorchester. Harmonia Mundi.
- 2024 – Falla: Pulcinella (Suite), Master Peter's Puppet Show & Hardpsichord Concerto. With Mahler Chamber Orchestra y Benjamin Alard.
- 2024 – Wagner: Parsifal (Live, Bayreuth Festspiele 2023). Andreas Schager, Elīna Garanča, Georg Zeppenfeld, Derek Welton, Jordan Shanahan, Tobias Kehrer, Bayreuther Festspielchor, Bayreuther Festspielorchester. Deutsche Grammophon.
- 2024 – Bruckner: Symphony No. 4 in E flat major 'Romantic'. With Bruges Orchestra. Harmonia Mundi.
