= Karlakórinn Heimir =

Karlakórinn Heimir ("The Heimir Men's Choir") is an Icelandic choir. It was founded in Skagafjörður on 28 December 1927. Most of the founding members of the choir came from a men's choir named Bændakórinn. Karlakórinn Heimir has traveled to many countries around the world.

The choir's first conductor was Gísli Magnússon. Subsequently, Jón Björnsson was conductor for almost 40 years. Helga Rós Indriðadóttir is the current conductor.

== Discography ==
- Karlakórinn Heimir (1977)
- Kom Söngur (1983)
- Undir Bláhimni (1991)
- Dísir Vorsins (1995)
- Fram í Heiðanna (1998)
- Stíg Fákur Létt (2001)
- Áfram Veginn (2003)
- Heyr Himnasmiður (2005)
