= The Night of Poetry =

1971 film by Jean-Claude Labrecque

The Night of Poetry (in French La Nuit de la poésie) was an event held at the Church of the Gesù in Montreal on the night of March 27, 1970. Gathering over 4,000 people to hear around fifty artists from various generations, this landmark event in the history of Quebec literature is considered one of the greatest celebrations of spoken word to have taken place in Quebec.

The Night of Poetry was immortalized by Jean-Claude Labrecque and Jean-Pierre Masse in a film produced for the National Film Board of Canada released in 1971.
