= Public Francophone Radios =

Consortium of French-language radio broadcasters

The Public Francophone Radios (French: Radios francophones publiques) is a group of French-speaking radio broadcasters comprising Radio France, Radio Canada, the Radio Télévision Suisse and RTBF.

It produces programmes such as L'actualité francophone (weekly news), La librairie francophone (books) and others.

== History ==
The Communauté des radios publiques de langue française (CRPLF) was created in 1955 and became the Radios francophones publiques in 2002.

In 2016, the Radios francophones publiques fused with the Communauté des télévisions francophones to form the Médias francophones publics.
