= Marie-Josée Bédard =

Canadian judge

Marie-Josée Bédard is a justice with the Federal Court of Canada since 2010. Prior to her appointment she was vice-chairperson of the Public Service Labour Relations Board.

== Biography ==
Bédard was born in Montreal. At the University of Ottawa, she received a bachelor’s degree in administration (1989) and a degree in civil law (1992). She was admitted to the Quebec Bar in 1993 and practiced employment law, administrative law and municipal law. On May 14, 2010, she was nominated as judge of the Federal Court and ex officio member of the Federal Court of Appeal.
