= Josée Vigneron-Ramackers =

- Birth name: Christiane-Josée Henriëtte Vigneron-Ramackers
- Also known as: Jo Delande
- Born: 25 January 1914; Leopoldsburg, Limburg, Belgium
- Died: 30 August 2002 (aged 88); Heusden-Zolder, Limburg, Belgium
- Occupations: Music educator; conductor; composer
- Instruments: Organ; piano

Christiane-Josée Vigneron-Ramackers (25 January 1914 – 30 August 2002), also known as Jo Delande, was a Belgian music educator, conductor and composer. She is known for founding the Academie voor Muziek, Theater & Dans in Maasmechelen in 1945 and for several prize-winning compositions.

== Biography ==
Josée Vigneron-Ramackers was born on 25 January 1914, in Leopoldsburg, Limbourg in Belgium. Her father was director of the boys' school of the Coal Mines in Eisden, where she lived from 1921. Her mother was the daughter of lyricist Jean-G. Close, and a soprano singing in charity concerts.

She studied at the Zusters Kindsheid Jesu's (Sisters of the Childhood of Jesus) normal school in Hasselt, and at the Limburgse Orgel- en Zangschool under the tuition of Herman and Arthur Meulemans, where she learned harmony and counterpoint. She obtained her organ, piano and teaching diplomas in 1934.

Vigneron-Ramackers was then appointed to the Koninklÿk Atheneum of Eisden and the Atheneum of Maaseik, where she taught singing and drawing from 1934 to 1969. In the meantime, she pursued her studies by correspondence, learning about fugue with Herman Meulemans, and orchestration with Arthur Meulemans and Paul Gilson.

In 1945, she founded the free music school Tuinwijk in Eisden, which would become the Gemeentelijke Muziekacademie in 1973, when taken over by the Maasmechelen community, and served as its director until 1979. According to the Vlaanderen (magazine), this academy was seen as "the cradle of musical life in the whole Maasland region." There, great importance was paid to the all-round education of musicians: compulsory Dutch and cultural history courses were introduced, as well as numerous exhibitions and drawing lessons.

In 1955, she created the Jeugd en Muziek department in Eisden, and opened a free music course for youth (Jeugdmuziekschool) in her academy, in order to remedy to some extent the pedagogical shortcomings of formal music education.

Vigneron-Ramackers also got involved in her father's school orchestra, turning the pre-war amateur band into a full-fledged chamber orchestra, the Kamerorkest van de Muziekacademie.

She received the Koopal Prize from the Ministry of Education and Culture in 1961 for five of her compositions. On 8 February 1978, she was awarded the prize for music of the province of Limburg. On 14 March 1981, she was made Officer of the Order of Leopold II by the Governor Vandermeulen.

== Musical style ==
Most of her music was composed with small ensembles in mind. She was at first influenced by the impressionist current, then her work turned out to be more in the neo-classical vein.

== Compositions ==
=== Works for orchestra ===
- 1958: Concertino, for oboe and chamber orchestra
- 1969: Mobiles, for 4 clarinets, percussion and string orchestra
- Studies, for small orchestra

=== Works for wind orchestra ===
- 1957: Vier etudes, for symphonic wind orchestra

=== Musical theatre ===
==== Stage music ====
- 1936: Er was eens
- 1937: De Sneeuwkoningin
- 1938: Het daghet (text by Ysbrand Paulus Stasse)

=== Vocal music ===
==== Works for choir ====
- 1972: Drie zangen van liefde en dood

==== Songs ====
- 1943: Rossignol, es-tu damné?, for voice and piano
- 1943: Quatre mélodies, for voice and piano
- 1956: Trois mélodies, for voice and orchestra
- 1972: Vocalise, for voice and piano, op. 18
- 1981: Vocalise 2, for voice and piano, op. 20
- 1982: Huit mélodies, for voice and piano
- 1984: Dix Vocalises, for voice and piano
- Sept mélodies, for soprano and piano, op. 61
- Vieilles chansons et rondes françaises, for middle voice and piano

=== Chamber music ===
- 1958: Duo rhapsodique, for clarinet and piano
- 1958: Hommage à Maurice Van Guchte, for clarinet octet
- 1959: Saxofoonkwartet
- 1965: Petit cortège presque chinois, for piano and two timbales, op. 10
- 1968: 3 Études de style, for oboe and saxophone
- 1972: Alternato, for cor anglais and piano
- 1984: Sonatine, for oboe and organ

=== Works for organ ===
- 1972: Haute Fagnes, op. 15

=== Works for piano ===
- 1967: Ballade des oiseaux captifs
- 1968: 6 Mini studi, op. 11
- 1971: 2 Preludi, op. 12

=== Works for guitar ===
- 1972: Variations sur Harbouya

=== Pedagogical works ===
- 1967: Van kleuterdreun naar notenleer
- 1968: Door volkslied tot notenleer
- 1971: Notenboekje
