= Marie-Josée Lord =

Canadian opera singer

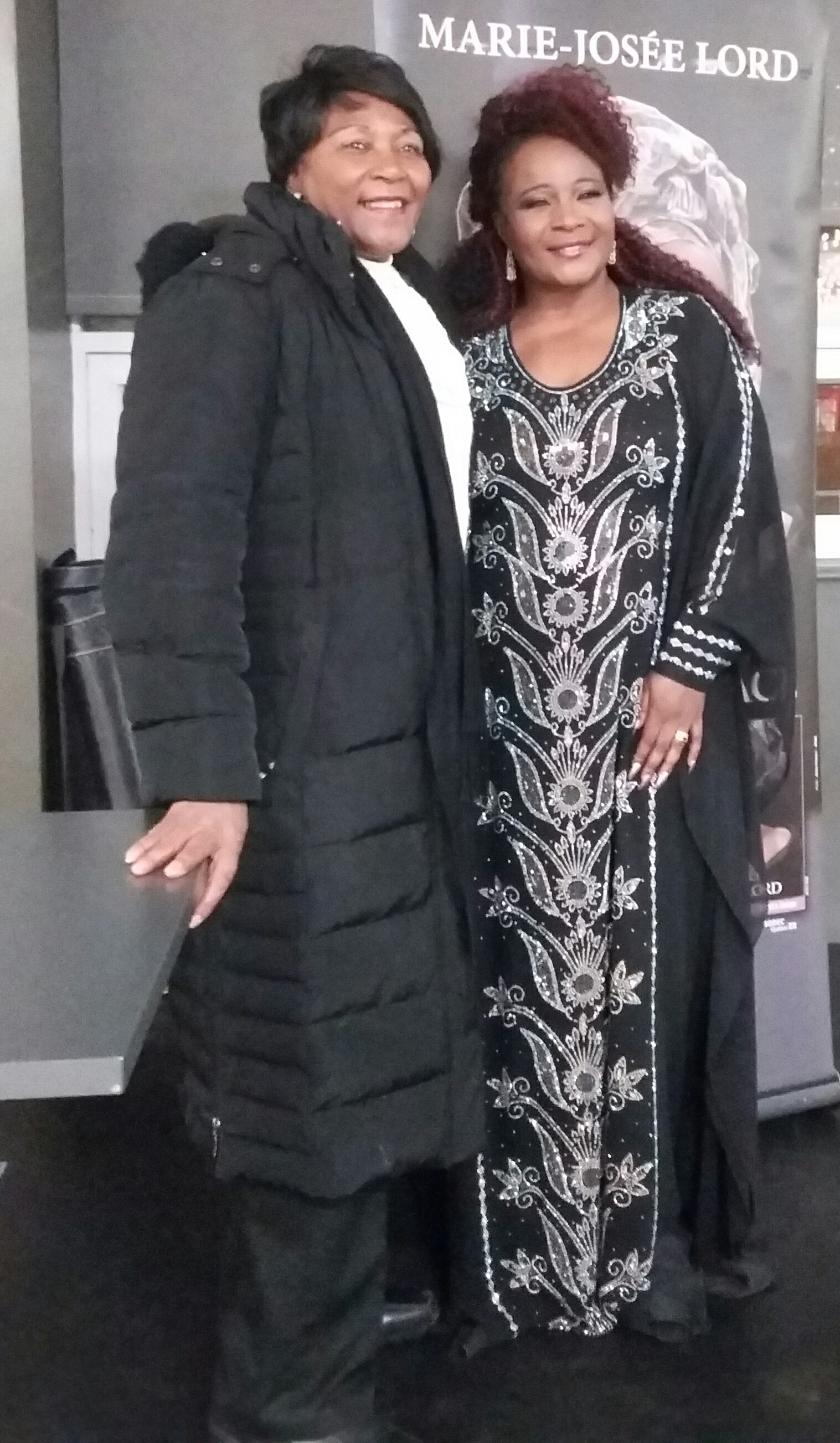
Marie-Josée Lord in Montreal, Quebec, Canada

Marie-Josée Lord (born 1970) is a Haitian-born Canadian soprano. Lord was adopted from Haiti at the age of six and grew up in Lévis. She made her professional debut as Liù in Turandot in 2003 at the Opéra de Québec. She was particularly noted for her Suor Angelica in 2006. Her debut album of arias was released in 2011, becoming one of the Canadian label Atma's best-selling recordings.

== Discography ==
- Marie-Josée Lord: Opera Arias. Orchestre Métropolitain, conductor Giuseppe Pietraroia. ATMA Classique, 2010
- Yo soy Maria. Simon Leclerc. ATMA Classique, 2012
- Amazing Grace. Ensemble Vocal Épiphanie, Jean-Willy Kunz (organ), Antoine Bareil (violin). ATMA Classique, 2014
- Femme - Verdi, Puccini, Massenet. Orchestre symphonique de Laval, conductor Alain Trudel. ATMA Classique, 2018
