= Valérie Milot =

Canadian harpist

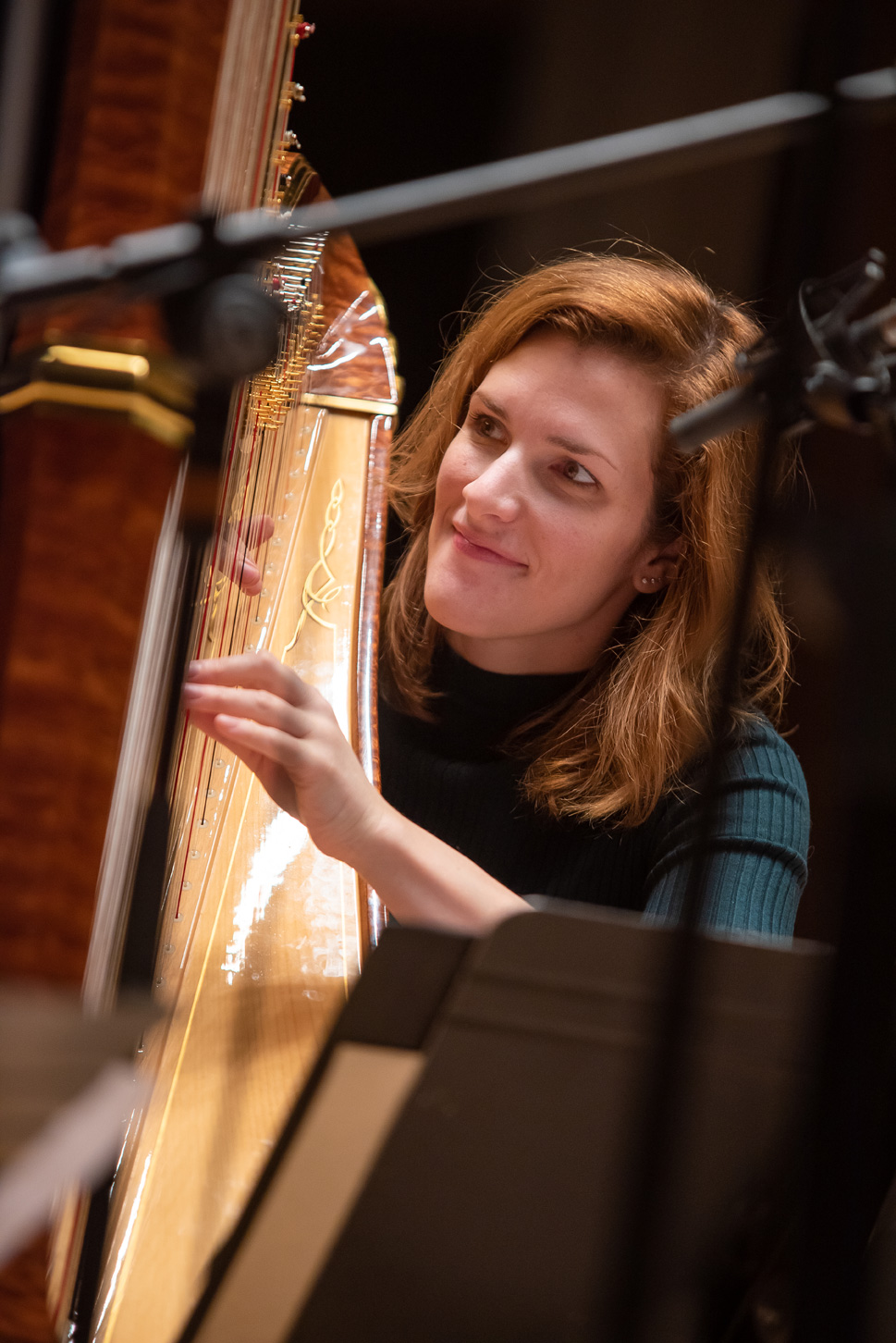
Valérie Milot

Valérie Milot is a Canadian harpist born in the province of Quebec. In 2008, she became the first harpist to win the prestigious Prix d’Europe (97th edition). Ms Milot is renowned for her mature musical instinct as well as for the strength and the refinement of her interpretations. Her first recording, called « Révélation », was released in October 2009.

== Biography ==
Described as a "very refined" artist by the critics (La Presse, Montreal), the young Québec harpist Valérie Milot has a flawless technique and a style that is both colourful and powerful, thus challenging the clichés one associates with the instrument.

After the jury unanimously awarded her the ‘'Prize of Great Distinction'’ and the Wilfred-Pelletier bursary when she finished her studies at the Conservatoire de musique de Trois-Rivières with Caroline Lizotte, Milot pursued her training in New York City with the internationally renowned harpist Rita Costanzi.

The winner of numerous competitions, Milot was the first harpist in nearly 100 years to receive the Prix d’Europe (2008). In 2005, she was a laureate at the American Harp Society National Competition, where she won the "Salzedo Centennial Fund" award for her interpretation of Carlos Salzedo's Scintillation. She also received the Prize for best interpretation of a contemporary Canadian work, for Tanzmusik by Glenn Buhr, at the OSM Standard Life Competition in 2007. The same work earned her the Prize for the best interpretation of a contemporary work at the International Harp Competition of the Cité des Arts de Paris in November 2008. A finalist of the Canadian Music Competition Stepping Stone in 2008. In November of that same year she was named Young Soloist 2009 by the Public Francophone Radios, which include Radio-France, Radio Suisse Romande, RTBF (Belgium) and Radio-Canada. In January 2009, she was unanimously crowned the Opus Awards Discovery of the Year, a gala event organized every year by the Conseil québécois de la musique. Finally, in May 2009, Milot was awarded the Louis-Philippe-Poisson Performing Arts Award by the Grands Prix Culturels 2009 of Trois-Rivières.

Valérie Milot has had an active career as a soloist and chamber musician. In July 2008, she went to the World Harp Congress in Amsterdam to perform a work for two harps, Raga, with Caroline Lizotte, who is also a harpist and the composer of that piece. In 2009, she gave recitals at the Lanaudière International Festival and Lachine Music Festival. She is also a soloist with the Violons du Roy as well as the SMCQ and she is undertaking a national tour for the Jeunesses musicales du Canada.

For her prodigious career she was named Révélation Radio-Canada Musique for the year 2009–2010.

== Awards ==
- 2009: Opus Award, Découverte de l'année
- 2009: Grands Prix culturels of Trois-Rivières City, Louis-Philippe-Poisson Performing Arts Award
- 2008: Trois-Rivière Music Conservatory and Wilfrid-Pelletier bursary, Prize of Great Distinction
- 2008: « Tremplin International » of the Canadian Music Competition, Finalist
- 2008: Prix d'Europe
- 2008: Concours International de harpe de la Cité des Arts de Paris, Prix pour la meilleure interprétation d’une œuvre contemporaine
- 2008: Public Francophone Radios, Young Soloist Award 2009
- 2007: OSM Standard Life Competition, Laureate
- 2007: OSM Standard Life Competition, Prize for the Best interpretation of a Canadian work (for Tanzmusik by Glenn Buhr)
- 2006: Canadian Music Competition, National Laureate
- 2005: American Harp Society National Competition, « Salzedo Centennial Fund » interpretation award (for Scintillation by Carlos Salzedo)
- 2004: Clermont-Pépin Music Competition, First Prize
- 2004: Canadian Music Competition, National Laureate
