= David Jalbert (pianist) =

Canadian pianist (born 1977)

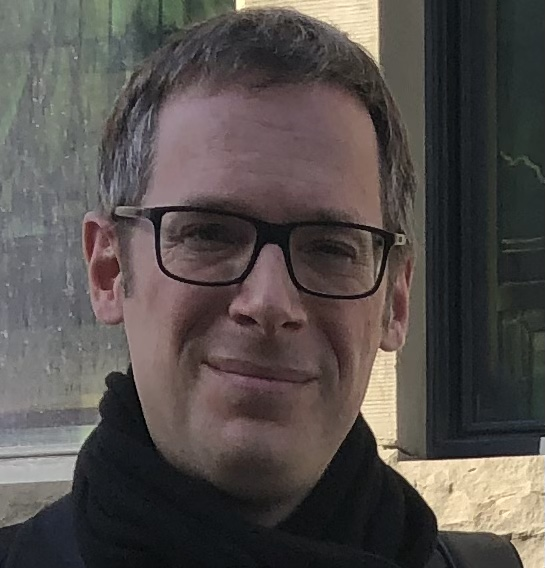
- David Jalbert

Background information
- Born: November 3, 1977 (age 48); Rimouski (Quebec)
- Genre: classical music
- Occupations: Pianist, professor of piano at University of Ottawa
- Instrument: Piano
- Website: https://davidjalbert.com/

David Jalbert is a Canadian concert pianist and professor at the University of Ottawa. He is considered by the CBC one of Canada's top 15 classical pianists "this country has ever produced".

== Biography ==
David Jalbert was born on November 3, 1977, in Rimouski, Quebec. He began playing the piano at the age of four with the encouragement of his father. He entered the Conservatoire de musique de Rimouski at the age of nine to study with Pauline Charron, who taught him piano for nearly 10 years.

== Education ==
He obtained his bachelor's degree in 1997 from the Conservatoire de musique du Québec. With a scholarship from the Canadian Fund for Research (CFAR), he entered the Master's program in performance at the Université de Montréal where he studied with Marc Durand. He obtained the degree in 1999 and was awarded the Governor General's Gold Medal for his academic achievements. He then completed an Artist Diploma at the Glenn Gould School in Toronto where he studied with several professors including Marc Durand, André Laplante, Leon Fleisher and John Perry. In 2001 he entered the Artist Diploma program at the Juilliard School under the guidance of Jerome Lowenthal.

David Jalbert has also participated in several summer academies including Orford Musique (Marc Durand, André Laplante), Banff Centre for the Arts (John Perry, Gilbert Kalish), Oberlin at Casalmaggiore (Marilyn Engle) and Music Academy of the West (Jerome Lowenthal).

== Career ==
David Jalbert placed first several times at the Canadian Music Competition during his youth (1993, 1994, 1995, 1996) but it was his 1st Prize at the 1997 OSM Competition that launched his career, leading to several tours with, among others, the Jeunesses Musicales du Canada and Debut Atlantic. He had other successes in competitions (CBC Young Performers Competition 1999, Dublin International Competition 2000, Canada Council for the Arts Sylva Gelber Prize in 2001), but successive engagements followed rapidly in recitals, chamber music and with major orchestras, particularly in Canada (Montreal Symphony Orchestra, Toronto Symphony Orchestra, National Symphony of Ireland, Vancouver Symphony Orchestra, Orchestre Métropolitain, Bielefelder Philharmoniker, Calgary Philharmonic Orchestra, among others).

In 2003, David Jalbert signed a recording contract with Endeavour in the United States. His first recording is devoted to the works of American composers John Corigliano and Frederic Rzewski, with whom he worked personally in preparation for the recording (Corigliano was also involved in the promotion of the recording). In 2006, he made his recording of the complete Nocturnes by Gabriel Fauré, which was later selected by the Tribune des critiques de disques of France-Culture as the modern recording of reference.

He regularly performs chamber music with his trio, Triple Forte, with the wind quintet Pentaèdre and horn player Louis-Philippe Marsolais (with whom he recorded for Oehms Classics in Munich), and with cellist Denise Djokic. The album Folklore, a collaboration with the latter, was a finalist in the 2005 Juno Awards. He also collaborates regularly with bassist Joel Quarrington, and has performed with artists such as Nicola Benedetti, Rachel Barton Pine and Jean-Philippe Collard.

In 2008 he signed with the ATMA Classique label and inaugurated this collaboration with a double album devoted to Shostakovich's 24 Preludes and Fugues opus 87, which was a worldwide critical success and earned him another Juno nomination, as well as the Opus Award for Record of the Year (modern/contemporary). His 2012 recording of Bach's Goldberg Variations was another critical success, chosen as "Canadian Record of the Year" by Ludwig van Toronto. David Jalbert was nominated for two other Juno Awards: for the first album of Triple Forte in 2013 (Trios de Ravel, Chostakovitch et Ives) and for his album of Stravinsky and Prokofiev ballet transcriptions in 2018. These two discs also won the Opus Awards. He has premiered works by Dinuk Wijeratne, Reiko Yamada and Kelly-Marie Murphy, and is currently preparing a three-disc recording of the complete Prokofiev Sonatas for ATMA Classique.

David Jalbert accepted a position as Professor of Piano at the University of Ottawa's School of Music in 2008; he became Associate Professor in 2014 and then Full Professor in 2020. He also teaches at the Orford Music Academy and has been invited to give lessons and masterclasses at school and festivals such as the Glenn Gould School, Pianofest in the Hamptons, Université de Montréal, Mount Royal Conservatory, UBC, and Juilliard, among others.

== Discography ==
=== Solo ===
- 2003 : Corigliano & Rzewski: Ballads & Fantasies
- 2006 : Fauré: Complete Nocturnes
- 2008 : Shostakovich • 24 Preludes & Fugues Opus 87
- 2010 : John Adams, Philip Glass: Piano Music
- 2012 : Bach: Variations Goldberg
- 2015 : Erik Satie, Francis Poulenc: Le Comble de la Distinction
- 2017 : Stravinsky & Prokofiev: Transcriptions pour piano
- 2020 : Joseph Haydn: Les Sept dernières paroles du Christ en Croix

=== Collaborations ===
- 2005 : Folklore — with Denise Djokic
- 2006 : The German Romantic Horn — with Louis-Philippe Marsolais
- 2009 : L’Héritage Beethoven — with Louis-Philippe Marsolais
- 2012 : Ravel, Shostakovich, Ives : Piano Trios — as a member of Triple Forte
- 2013 : Francis Poulenc: Musique de chambre — with Pentaèdre
- 2013 : Brothers in Brahms — with Joel Quarrington
- 2013 : Rachmaninoff & Chopin : Cello Sonatas — with Denise Djokic
- 2017 : Schubert : An Die Musik — with Joel Quarrington
- 2021 : Paul Hindemith: Musique de chambre pour cor — with Louis-Philippe Marsolais, Louis-Pierre Bergeron, Pentaèdre, Simon Bourget and Xavier Fortin

== Prizes and awards ==
- First place Concours de musique Clermont-Pépin (1996)
- First place Concours OSM (1997)
- Second place at Concours national des jeunes interprètes de la Société Radio-Canada (1999)
- Governor General's Gold Medal (1999)
- Fourth place at Dublin International Piano Competition (2000)
- Award of the Sylva-Gelber Music Foundation (2001)
- Nomination at the Juno Awards for Folklore with Denise Djokic (2005)
- Award of East Coast music in the category "Best classical recording of the year" for Folklore (2006)
- Award Virginia-Parker from Canada Council for the Arts (2007)
- Opus Award in the category "Concert of the year - Regions" (2008)
- Opus Award in the category "Album of the year - Modern and contemporary music" for 24 Preludes and Fugues of Shostakovich (2008)
- Nomination at the Juno Awards for Shostakovich: 24 Preludes and Fugues (2008)
- Nomination at the Juno Awards for Ravel, Ives, Shostakovich: Piano Trios with Triple Forte (2013)
- Opus Award in the category "Album of the year - Modern and contemporary music" for Ravel, Ives, Shostakovich: Piano Trios with Triple Forte (2014)
- Opus Award in the category "Album of the year - romantic music" for Brothers in Brahms, with Joel Quarrington (2015)
- Opus Award in the category "Show of the year - Regions" (2017)
- Nomination at the Juno Awards for Stravinski & Prokofiev: Transcriptions pour piano (2018)
- Opus Award in the category "Album in the year - Modern and contemporary music" for Stravinsky & Prokofiev: Transcriptions pour piano (2019)
