= Josée Nadeau =

Canadian painter

Josée Nadeau is a Canadian painter and producer. She gained international recognition after spending 10 years as a protégée of European Art Expert Gérald Van der Kemp, the curator of Claude Monet's Garden and Château de Versailles prior for a period of 27 years.

== Career ==
At the invitation of The curator and European Art Expert Gerald Van der Kemp and his wife Florence, Nadeau traveled to the garden of Claude Monet each year from 1998 to 2008 to paint and use the premises for inspiration while living on the grounds in the curator's private studio.

In 2005 Nadeau worked in Collaboration with HP laser color Printers where at New York Art Expo the images of her art such as Million Dollar Baby which is owned by Clint Eastwood came out of their color laser copier in front of a 85,000 attendance. The following yr, her painting of The Long Horn Bull was chosen and placed the first painting in the entryway of New York Art Expo at The Kravis Center for the full duration of the fair.

Nadeau’s paintings captured the attention of The Curator Van der Kemp and his wife, who introduced her to high society in Europe. After Van der Kemp’s passing in 2001, Florence invited Nadeau to sit at the head table at the Ball of Versailles and introduced her as her late husband’s preferred artist.

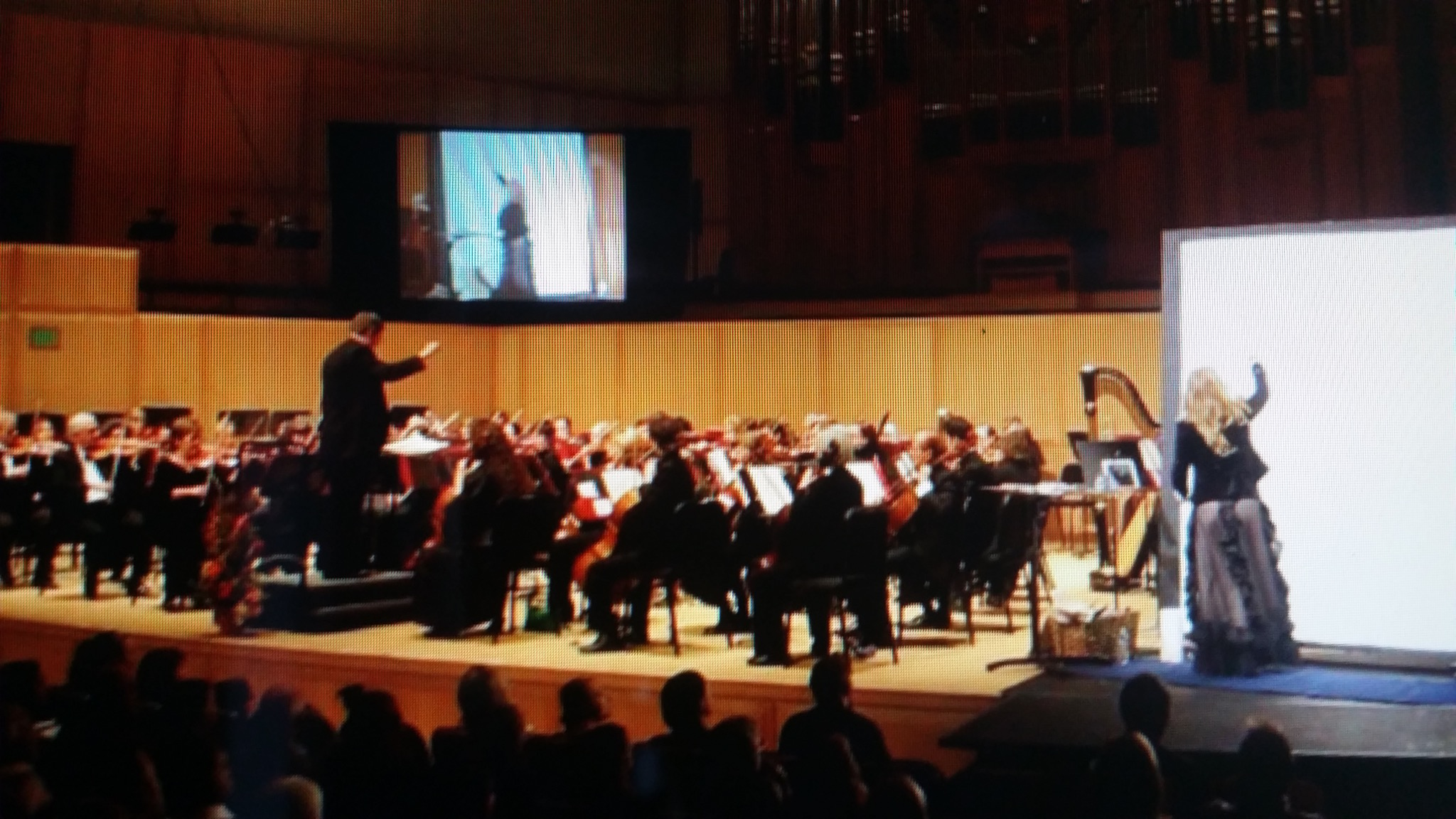
Nadeau in 2012 with The Salt Lake Symphony.

Nadeau began to paint to music in front of an audience after meeting George Harrison, who sang to her for four hours at the home of Guy Laliberté, the founder of Cirque du Soleil.

That same year, she was a guest at Dionne Warwick’s 50th-anniversary celebration concert in Miami, where she painted a large portrait of Dionne on stage while Warwick sang “Do You Know the Way to San Jose” in front of 1,000 people. In 2014, Nadeau painted Nelson Mandela at Riverside Church during a production of Footsteps of Mandela.
