= Marie-Josée Coulombe =

Canadian sculptor

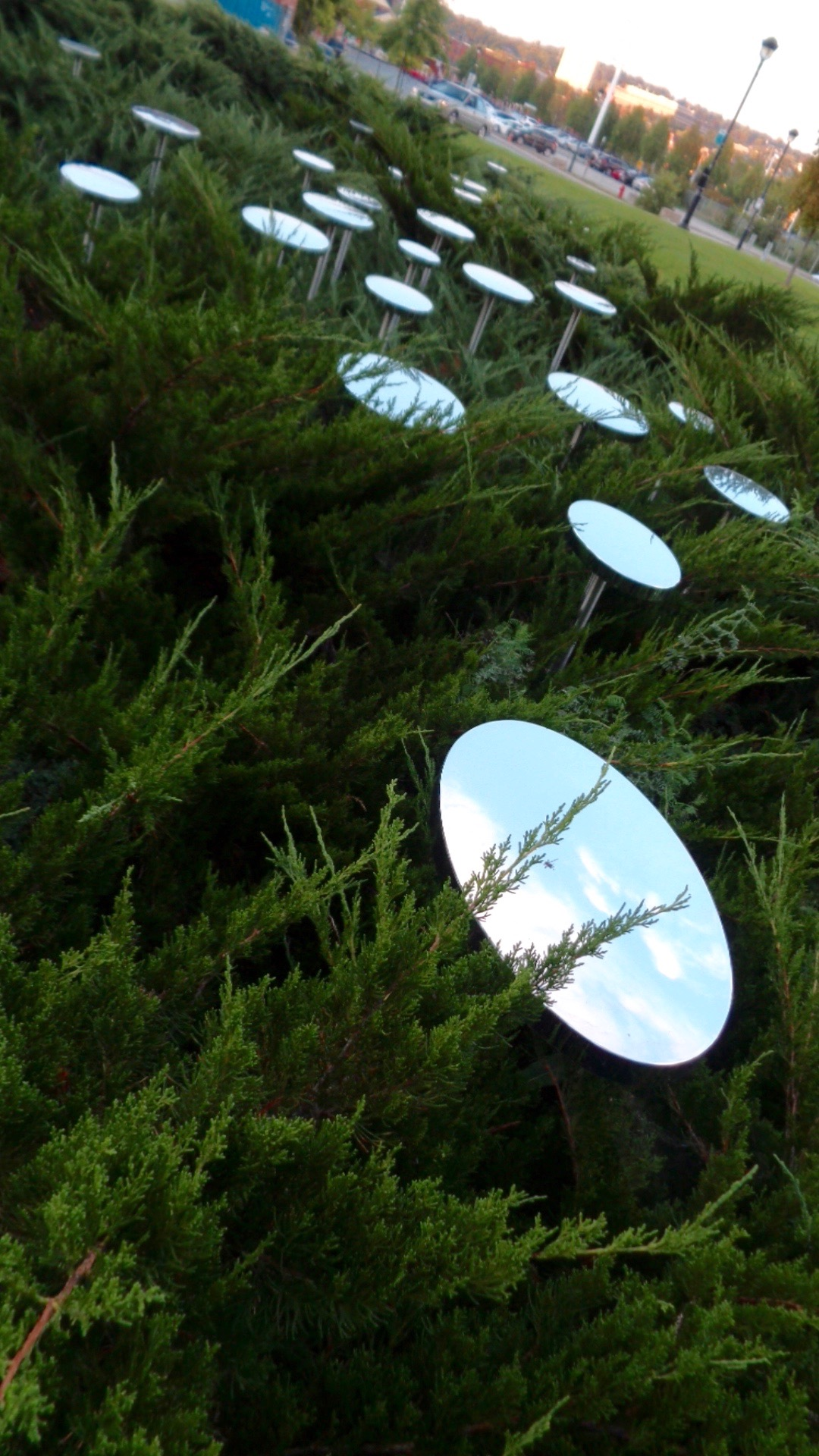
Marie-Josée Coulombe, Les ciels inversés, 2008.

Marie-Josée Coulombe (born 1965) is a Canadian sculptor.

Her work is included in the collection of the Musée national des beaux-arts du Québec and the City of Ottawa public art collection
