= Opéra de Québec =

Canadian opera company founded in 1983

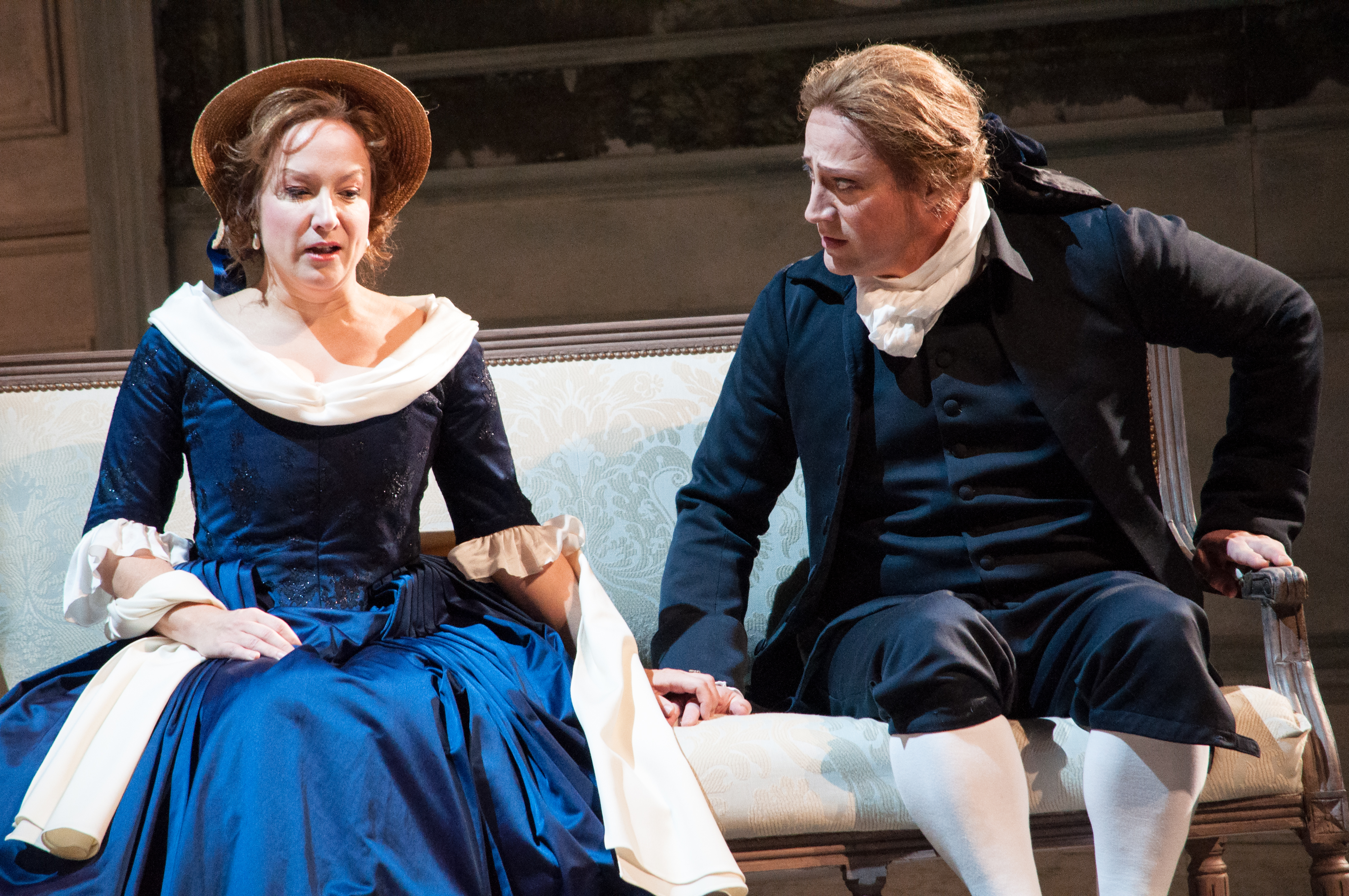
Opéra de Québec

Opéra de Québec (French pronunciation: [ɔpeʁa də kebɛk]) or Opera of Quebec City is a Canadian opera company founded in 1983; it is related to Opéra de Montréal, founded in 1980. The company does not have its own venue but performs in the Grand Théâtre de Québec on 269 Boulevard René-Lévesque Est.

A previous professional Montréal-based opera company, the Opéra du Québec (i.e. "of Le Québec," the province), had operated in Montréal from 1971 to 1975 and also performed in Quebec City. There is also an annual Québec Opera Festival.
