= Marie-Josée Simard =

Canadian percussionist and music educator

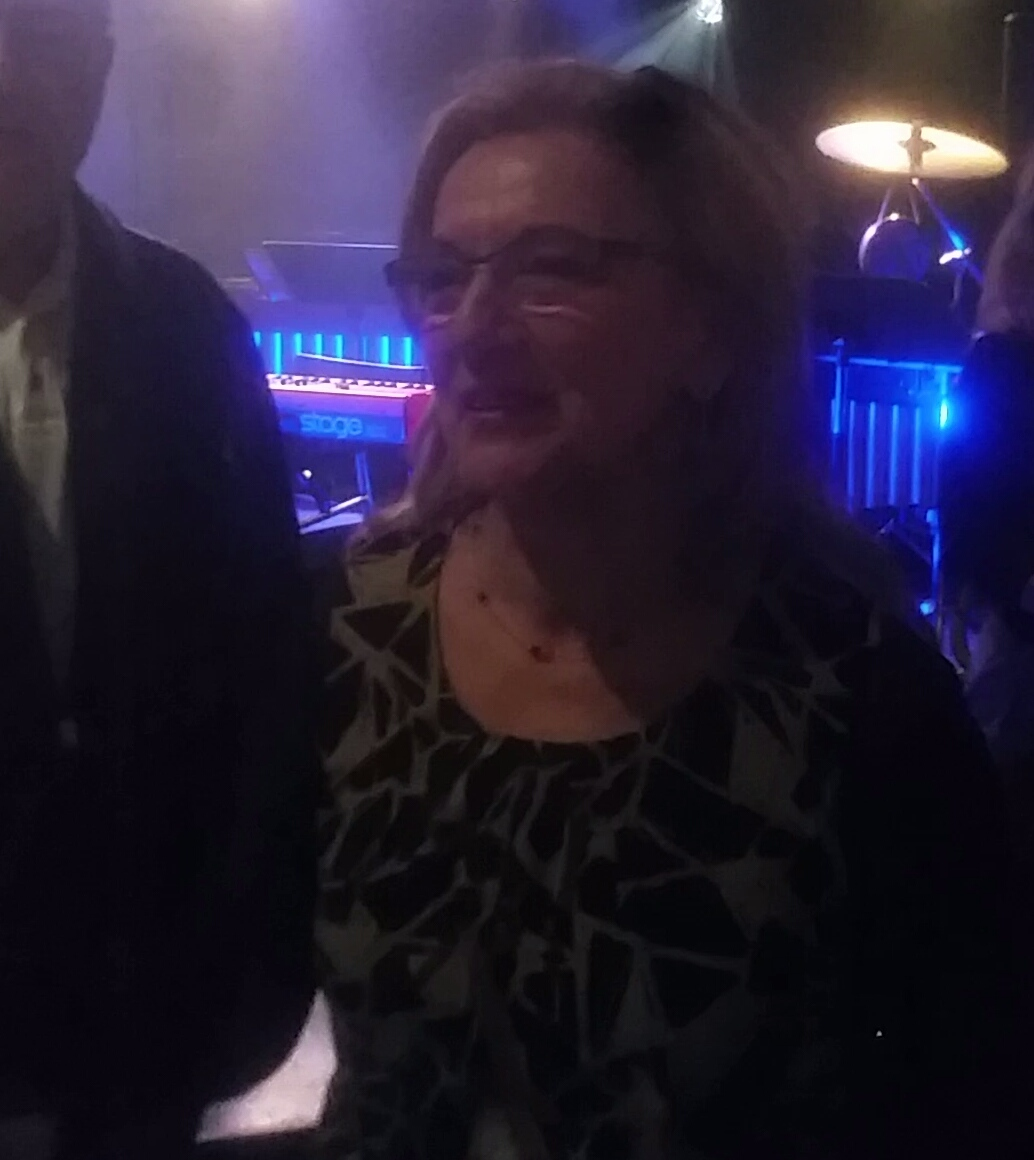
Marie-Josée Simard

Marie-Josée Simard (born November 29, 1956) is a Canadian percussionist and music educator living in Quebec.

She was born in La Baie (now part of Saguenay). She performed on the vibraphone with her parents' orchestra. Simard was taught by her mother until she entered the Conservatoire de musique et d'art dramatique du Québec in 1974. Then, from 1976 to 1979, she studied at the Conservatoire de musique du Québec à Montréal (CMM). She was the first woman to graduate as a percussionist and the first woman to win a first prize in percussion from the CMM. She continued her studies at the Orford Art Centre, with Michael Skinner and James Blades in London and with Leigh Howard Stevens in New York City. In 1979, she won the Search for Stars contest sponsored by the du Maurier Council for the Performing Arts.

During the 1984 royal visit to Canada by Queen Elizabeth II and the Duke of Edinburgh, Simard performed as a guest soloist with the Toronto Symphony Orchestra. In 1992, she represented Canada in a Metropolitan Opera benefit concert. She was a soloist with Canadian orchestras including the Montreal Symphony Orchestra, the Orchestre des jeunes du Québec, the Kingston Symphony, the Edmonton Symphony Orchestra, the Vancouver Symphony Orchestra and the Kitchener-Waterloo Symphony. She has also performed on broadcasts by the Canadian Broadcasting Corporation and toured internationally.

More than 25 works have been written for and performed for the first time by her including:

- Concerto for Marimba and Vibraphone by Rachel Laurin
- Xylo fun by François Dompierre
- Simard-Suite by Pierre-Max Dubois
- Dialogues for marimba and orchestra by Denis Gougeon
- Venu de l'est: hiver '44 by Michel Longtin
- Concerto for marimba and orchestra by Clermont Pépin
- the concerto for marimba and vibraphone by Rumanian composer Maya Badian

Simard has also conducted percussion ensembles.

She worked at the Domaine Forget Music and Dance Academy until 1992, when she became a professor at the Conservatoire de musique de Montréal. Simard has served on juries for the Canada Council, the Conseil québécois de la musique and the Conseil des arts du Québec.
