= Mheibes =

Iraqi traditional game

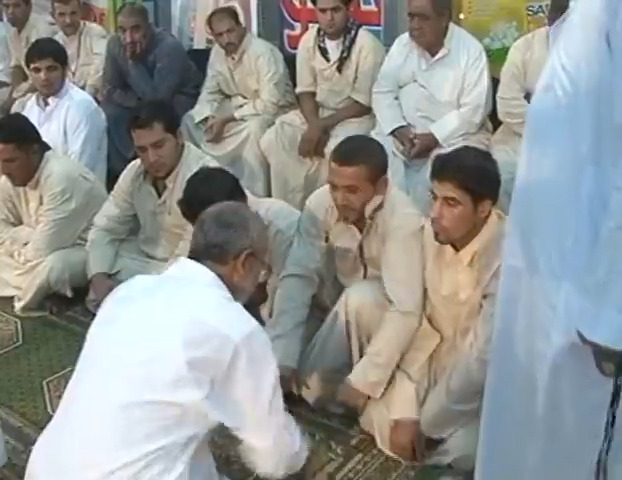
A mheibes player considers in which hand a player might be holding the ring

A short video about Mheibes

Mheibes (Arabic: محيبس) is a traditional game involving two teams. It is mostly played in the Arab Mashriq, and specifically in Iraq. It has similarities to other games involving an object hidden in the hand, including the Native American Handgame, the Welsh Tippit and the English game Up Jenkins.

The word Mheibes is a cognate of the word mihbes or mehbis (Arabic: محبس), which means ring. Its historical origins are unclear, but it is thought to go back to at least the 1600s. The rules most common in current use coalesced during the 1990s. Public and organised play was suppressed in some regions of Iraq under ISIL, but has seen a resurgence in the years since.

Traditionally it is played during Ramadan, with games starting in the evening and continuing into the night. Only men play in competitive leagues, but informal games sometimes include women, and in 2024 the Baghdadi Museum hosted a women's match.

== Gameplay ==
The game involves two teams, with each team attempting to hide a ring from the other. The game begins with a player going around the team, to give the ring to one person, trying to prevent the other team from knowing which player holds the ring.

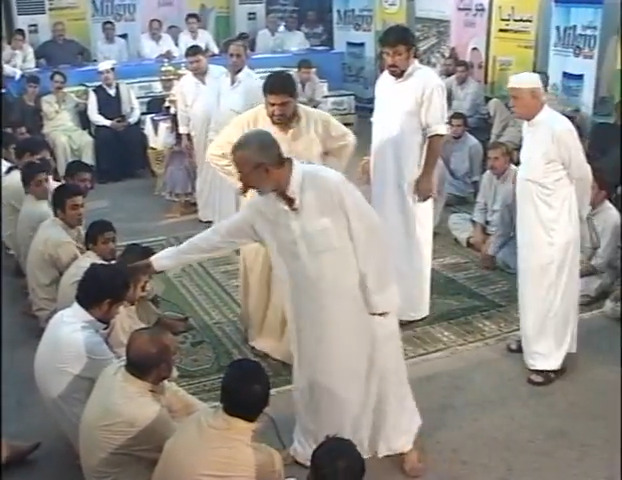
A mheibes player rules out an opponent who they believe is not holding the ring

The other team must then nominate a player, who has only one guess to find out who is holding the ring (and in which hand). The decision is based on studying the facial expressions of each team member. The player can also rule out players if he believes they do not hold the ring. He can rule out as many as he wants.

When a player rules out a hand holding the ring, the ring is exposed followed by a shouting of the word Bat (Arabic: بات) implying in the Iraqi-dialect "to sleep over" or to "stay the night", as the ring is once again hidden.
