= Laus Polyphoniae =

Laus Polyphoniae is the summer edition of the Festival van Vlaanderen (Festival of Flanders)-Antwerp. Since 1994 this early music and polyphony festival takes place in the last weeks of August.

Every edition has its central theme or compositor. An ensemble in residence presents several concerts regarding the annual theme.

Past themes:

- Orlandus Lassus (1994)
- 16th Century Antwerp Music Printers (1995)
- I Fiamminghi in Italia (1996)
- Johannes Ockeghem and His Era (1997)
- Música Ibérica (1998)
- Anthony van Dyck and the Music of His Era (1999)
- The first polyphonists (2000)
- Josquin Desprez and his era (2001)
- Musica Britannica (2002)
- Philippus de Monte and the Habsburg Courts (2003)
- Polifonia Italiana (2004)
- Jacob Obrecht and His Era (2005) - Capilla Flamenca
- Conquista y reconquista (2006) - Ensemble Elyma
- Franse polyfonie (2007) - Ensemble Clément Janequin
- Music in the Hanseatic Cities (2008) - Concerto Palatino
- Cappella Sistina (2009) - Collegium Vocale Gent
- Manu Scriptum (2010) - Huelgas Ensemble
- Sons Portugueses (2011) - La Colombina
- Mare Adriatico (2012) - Daedalus en Dialogos
- Spem in Alium by Thomas Tallis (2013)
