= Up Jenkins =

Party game

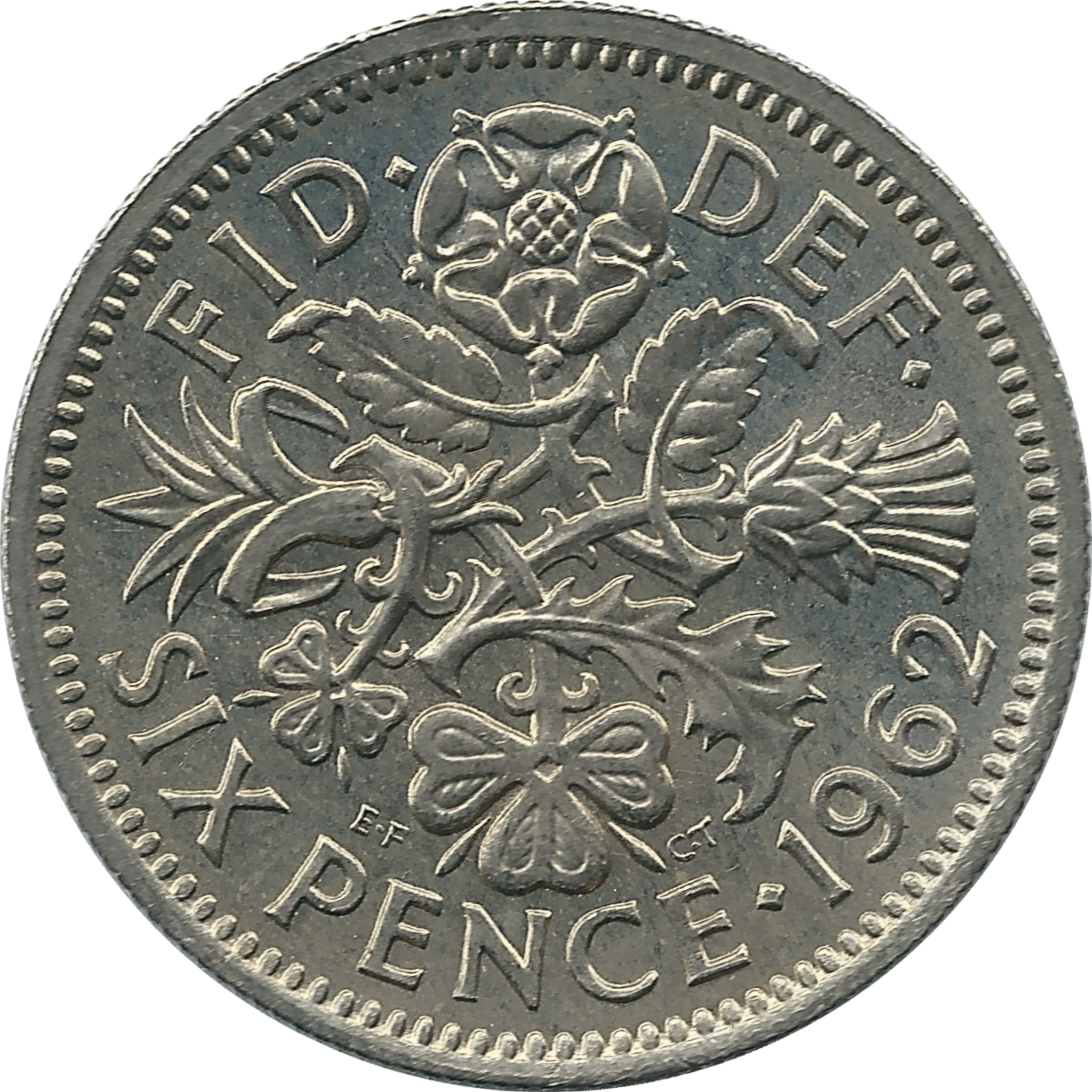
- Up Jenkins is played with a single coin
- Players: typically two teams of 2–4
- Playing time: 10–20 minutes or less
- Chance: None
- Skills: Guessing, 'poker face'

Up Jenkins, also known by the shortened name Jenkins, is a party game in which players conceal a coin (or ring, button, etc.) in their palm as they slap it on a table with their bare hands. The goal of the game is for the players on the team without the coin to correctly identify which hand the coin is under. The game typically consists of two- to four-player teams, one on each side of a table. There are no official rules, so rules may vary widely. The game is often played with alcoholic beverages with which to drink as a forfeit.

== Gameplay ==
The captain of one team takes a coin and passes it under the table to the second person of the team. The players on that team pass the coin under the table back and forth from one player to another. The object of the game is to do it so carefully that the opposing team cannot guess which player has the coin.

Once this selection is made, the opposing team's captain yells "Up Jenkins" at which point all players on the team with the coin place their elbows on the table with their hands, closed in a fist, pointing straight toward the ceiling. The opposing team's captain then yells "Down Jenkins" or "Bang Ems", at which point the "coin" team slams their palms face-down on the table. The goal of this stage of the game is to conceal the "clink" of the coin on the table to confuse the other team as to where the coin is.

In some variants of the game, other commands can be given before the palms are slammed onto the table. A request of "Open Windows" requires selected finger gaps to be opened, and "Creepy Crawlies" requires players to curl their hands and move them around on the table in the manner of a crab.

In the guessing phase of the game, the non-coin team selects palms, one by one, in an attempt to isolate the coin as the "last palm standing." Where the games is played in conjunction with alcohol, successful isolation results in the coin team drinking. Failure to do so results in the non-coin team drinking. The quantity of alcohol consumed per round is a matter of house rules or local variation.

The game can also be played as a children's party game.

== Alternative versions ==
- A similar game in Wales is Tippit, which was used as the basis for the S4C television game show Tipit.
- Mheibes or Mhebiss in Iraq, often played during Ramadan and was also once televised.
- Handgame is a native American guessing game where bones are concealed in a team's hands
- Referred to as "Up Chickens" in many Midwestern states, especially Ohio.

== In popular culture ==
- Up Jenkins is played by the office workers at Poor Richards Pub in the episode "Cocktails" of The Office.
- Up Jenkins is played by members of the newsroom at a party in the show The Newsroom (Season 1 episode 7) (titled "5/1")
- Up Jenkins is referred to as a 'lesser known' alternative to 'Hide the Thimble' in chapter 10 of Sir Henry Howarth Bashford's 1924 satirical novel, Augustus Carp Esq., by Himself - Being the Autobiography of a Really Good Man.
- Up Jenkins is referred to by Major Burnaby in Agatha Christie's 1931 novel The Sittaford Mystery (published in the U.S. as The Murder at Hazelmoor): he thinks "in my day it was 'Up Jenkins'" when the subject of table-turning is raised, and suggests that the ultimate point of both games was to allow young couples to hold hands under the table.
- Up Jenkins is referred to by Margot Beste-Chetwynde in Evelyn Waugh's 1928 novel Decline and Fall when she visits her former fiancé Paul Pennyfeather in prison and they are asked by the warder to both put their hands on the table in front of them.
- Up Jenkins is referred to in Evelyn Waugh's 1957 novel The Ordeal of Gilbert Pinfold as a game Pinfold plays with his children at Christmas.
- Up Jenkins is referred to in Grace Livingston Hill's 1920 novel Cloudy Jewel: "the entire company would gather around [the table] with uplifted thumbs and eager faces uproariously playing "up Jenkins" for an hour or two."
- Up-Jenkins is referred to in Elinor M. Brent-Dyer's 1924 novel A Head Girl's Difficulties as a game played by the Trevennors, Comptons and Athertons.
- Referred to as 'Up-Jenkins' in a list of party games in chapter 15 of Penelope Mortimer's 1971 novel The Home: "...but at home he had been submissive... teaching them to play Up-Jenkins and Hunt the Thimble..."
- Up Jenkins is mentioned in a well-known scene in David Nobbs's 1976 BBC TV comedy series The Fall and Rise of Reginald Perrin. It forms part of Jimmy's list of the kinds of people his secret army will be against: "Clive Jenkins, Roy Jenkins, Up Jenkins, up everybody's..."
- The game is called 'Hands Up, Jenkins' in the description of Christmas in New Zealand in the 1890s in Alan Mulgan's 1958 book The Making of a New Zealander.

== See also ==
- List of drinking games
