= Eurovision Choir of the Year 2017 =

International music competition

Date and venue
- Final: 22 July 2017
- Venue: Arena Riga; Riga, Latvia

Organisation
- Organiser: European Broadcasting Union (EBU)
- Executive supervisor: Jon Ola Sand

Production
- Host broadcaster: Latvijas Televīzija (LTV)
- Director: Peter Maniura
- Executive producer: Ieva Rozentāle
- Presenters: Eric Whitacre; Eva Johansone

Participants
- Number of entries: 9
- Debuting countries: Austria; Belgium; Denmark; Estonia; Germany; Hungary; Latvia; Slovenia; Wales
- Participation map: Participating countries

Vote
- Voting system: Jury voting by a panel of three judges to decide the winning choir
- Winning choir: Slovenia; Carmen Manet

Eurovision Choir of the Year 2017 was the first Eurovision Choir competition for choral singers, which was organised by the European Broadcasting Union (EBU) and Interkultur Foundation. It was held on 22 July 2017, at the Arena Riga, in the Latvian capital, Riga. The event was produced by Latvian host broadcaster Latvijas Televīzija (LTV) and the Riga Tourism Development Bureau.

Nine countries participated, including Wales, which marked the second time that the United Kingdom has not participated as a unified state in any of the Eurovision Network events, after 1994, when Wales participated lastly in Jeux Sans Frontières. Carmen Manet of Slovenia won the contest, with Wales and hosts Latvia placing second and third respectively.

== Location ==
Arena Riga, venue of the inaugural Eurovision Choir.

On 14 February 2017, it was confirmed that the inaugural Eurovision Choir of the Year would take place at the Arena Riga, located in the Latvian capital. The arena is primarily used for ice hockey, basketball and concerts and holds a maximum of 14,500. This marked Latvia's first hosting of a Eurovision network event since the Eurovision Song Contest 2003, which took place at Skonto Hall in Riga.

== Format ==
Competing countries who are members of the European Broadcasting Union (EBU) are eligible to participate in Eurovision Choir. Nine countries participated at the inaugural event. Each competing country was represented by a professional choir, and each performed a choral piece lasting no more than six minutes in length. Each piece may include singular or several musical works or of a free genre; but must contain national or regional influence from the participating country.

Tickets for the event went on sale on 15 March 2017. The winning choir (Slovenia) received the title of Eurovision Choir of the Year 2017 and prize money from Riga City Council. The event was opened with a performance of "Fly to Paradise" by host Whitacre, with over 500 singers on stage and Jolanta Strikaite in the arena and closed with Ēriks Ešenvalds’ "My Song", performed by all the choirs, with the Festival Stage Choir, Dāvis Jurka and the live audience.

=== Presenters ===
Announced on 27 February 2017, Grammy-winning composer and conductor Eric Whitacre and LTV culture presenter Eva Johansone, were the hosts for the inaugural contest that took place on 22 July 2017, in Riga, Latvia.

== Participating countries ==
On 27 February 2017, the EBU confirmed that seven countries would be participating in the inaugural contest. Following the announcements of Hungary and Wales joining the event, this increased to nine competing choirs.

Participants and results
R/O	Country	Broadcaster	Choir	Song(s)	Language(s)	Conductor	Pl.
1	Estonia	ERR	Estonian TV Girls’ Choir	"Absolute Tormis"	Estonian	Aarne Saluveer	—
2	Denmark	DR	Academic Choir of Aarhus	"I Seraillets Have" "Wiigen-Lied"	Danish German	Ole Faurschou	—
3	Belgium	RTBF	Les Pastoureaux	"Dans la troupe" "Ensemble"	French	Philippe Favette	—
4	Germany	WDR	Jazzchor Freiburg	"African Call" "Palettes"	Imaginary German	Bertrand Gröger	—
5	Slovenia	RTVSLO	Carmen Manet	"Ta na Solbici" "Adrca" "Aj, zelena je vsa gora"	Slovene	Primož Kerštanj	1
6	Hungary	MTVA	Bartók Béla Férfikar	"Karádi nóták"	Hungarian	Lakner Tamás	—
7	Wales	S4C	Côr Merched Sir Gâr	"O, Mountain, O" "Mil harddach" "Wade in the Water"	Czech Welsh English	Islwyn Evans	2
8	Austria	ORF	Hardchor Linz	"Ave Maria" "I tua wos i wü" "Rah"	Latin German English	Alexander Koller	—
9	Latvia	LTV	Spīgo	"Grezna saule debesīs" "Es čigāna meita biju"	Latvian	Līga Celma-Kursiete	3

== International broadcasts and voting ==
=== Commentators ===
Most countries sent commentators to Riga or commentated from their own country, in order to add insight to the participants.

Broadcasters and commentators in participating countries
Country	Broadcaster(s)	Commentator(s)	Ref.
Austria	ORF 2 (delayed)	Alexander Žigo and Teresa Vogl	
Belgium	Musiq'3, La Trois	Camille De Rijck	
Denmark	DR K	Ole Tøpholm and Phillip Faber	
Estonia	ETV2	Eero Raun	
Germany	Arte Concert (live); SR, SWR, WDR (delayed)	Unknown	
Hungary	M5	Bolla Milán	
Latvia	LTV1	Edgars Raginskis	
Slovenia	RTV SLO1	Igor Velše	
Wales	S4C	Morgan Jones and Elin Manahan Thomas	

Broadcasters and commentators in non-participating countries
Country	Broadcaster(s)	Commentator(s)	Ref.
Albania	RTSH 1 (delayed)	Andri Xhahu	
Australia	SBS (broadcast on 16 September 2017)	No commentary	
France	Arte Concert	Unknown	
Norway	NRK2 (broadcast on 1 April 2018)	Arild Erikstad	
Serbia	RTS2	Silvana Grujić	
Ukraine	Radio Ukraine (delayed)	Unknown	

=== Professional jury ===
The winner of the contest is decided upon the votes from a professional jury, which is made up of the following:

- Latvia – Elīna Garanča (mezzo-soprano)
- United Kingdom – John Rutter (composer)
- Switzerland – Nicolas Fink (conductor)

== Other countries ==
For a country to be eligible for potential participation in Eurovision Choir, it needs to be an active member of the European Broadcasting Union (EBU). It is currently unknown whether the EBU issue invitations of participation to all 56 active members like they do for the Eurovision Song Contest.

- Norway – On 5 September 2016, Norwegian national broadcaster NRK announced that they would not be making their debut at the 2017 contest due to their existing involvement in Let the Peoples Sing, another EBU competition.
- Sweden – On 29 May 2017, Swedish national broadcaster SVT announced that they would not be making their debut at the 2017 contest.
