= Eurovision 2017 (disambiguation) =

The Eurovision Song Contest 2017 was the 62nd edition of the Eurovision Song Contest.

Eurovision 2017 may also refer to:

- Eurovision Choir of the Year 2017, the first Eurovision Choir that was held in July 2017
- Junior Eurovision Song Contest 2017, the fifteenth Junior Eurovision Song Contest that was held in November 2017
