= Eurovision 2019 (disambiguation) =

The Eurovision Song Contest 2019 was the 64th edition of the Eurovision Song Contest.

Eurovision 2019 may also refer to:

- Eurovision Choir 2019, the second Eurovision Choir that was held in August 2019
- Junior Eurovision Song Contest 2019, the seventeenth Junior Eurovision Song Contest that was held in November 2019
