= Llibre Vermell de Montserrat =

1300s collection of devotional texts

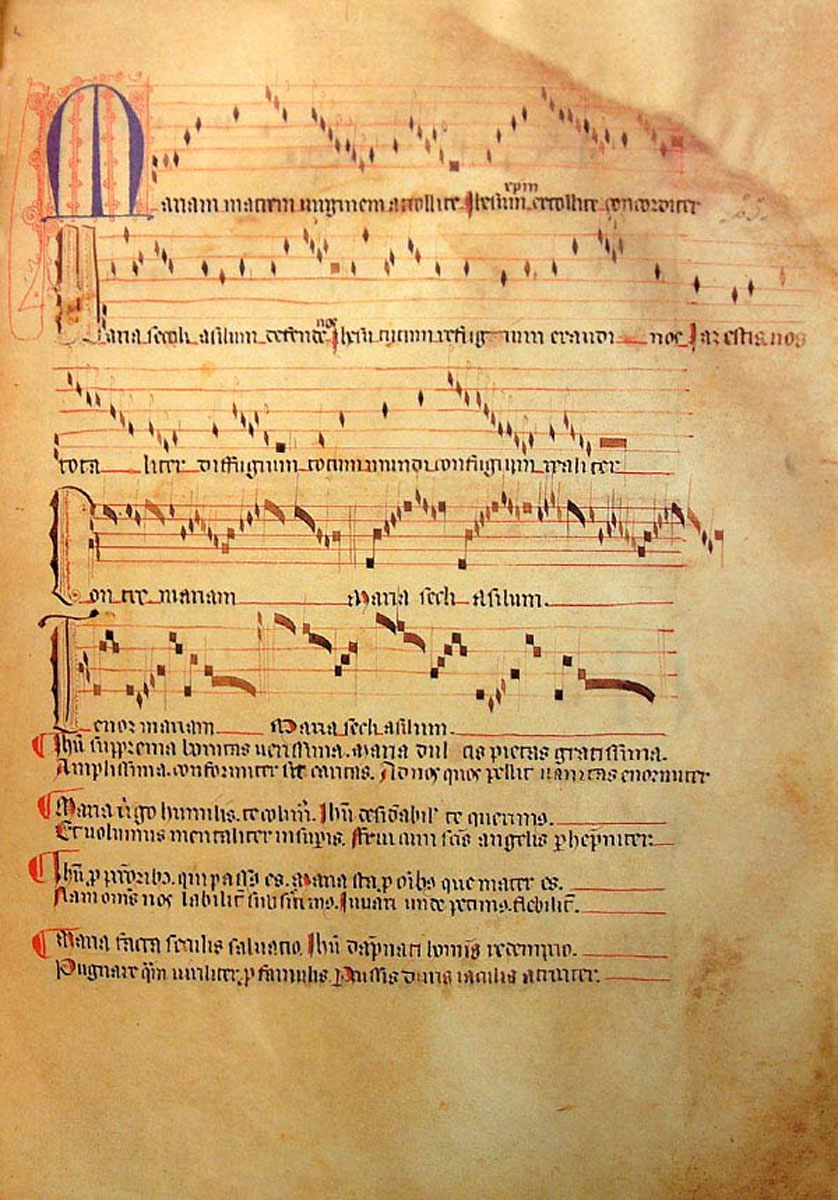
The song Mariam matrem virginem, a leaf from the Llibre Vermell de Montserrat.

The Llibre Vermell de Montserrat (Catalan pronunciation: [ˈʎiβɾə βəɾˈmɛʎ ðə munsəˈrat], "Red Book of Montserrat") is a manuscript collection of devotional texts containing, amongst others, some late medieval songs. The 14th-century manuscript was compiled in and is still located at the monastery of Montserrat outside Barcelona in Catalonia, Spain.

== Manuscript ==
The manuscript was prepared in approximately 1399. It originally contained 172 double pages, of which 32 have been lost. Six folios contain music. The title "The Red Book of Montserrat" describes the red binding in which the collection was placed in the 19th century. No composer is identified for any of the songs it contains.

The monastery holds the shrine of the Virgin of Montserrat, which was a major site of pilgrimage during the time it was compiled.

== Music ==
The purpose of the compilation is made clear by its anonymous compiler himself:

Quia interdum peregrini quando vigilant in ecclesia Beate Marie de Monte Serrato volunt cantare et trepudiare, et etiam in platea de die, et ibi non debeant nisi honestas ac devotas cantilenas cantare, idcirco superius et inferius alique sunt scripte. Et de hoc uti debent honeste et parce, ne perturbent perseverantes in orationibus et devotis contemplationibus.
"Because the pilgrims wish to sing and dance while they keep their watch at night in the church of the Blessed Mary of Montserrat, and also in the light of day; and in the church no songs should be sung unless they are chaste and pious, for that reason these songs that appear here have been written. And these should be used modestly, and take care that no one who keeps watch in prayer and contemplation is disturbed."

The songs, therefore, were written for the pilgrims to have something appropriately "chaste and pious" to sing and dance to (circle dances). The songs are in Catalan, Occitan and Latin. While the collection was written near the end of the 14th century, much of the music in the collection appears from its style to originate earlier; the motet Imperayritz de la ciutat joyosa contains two different texts that can be sung simultaneously, a style that would have been old-fashioned when the manuscript was compiled.

The songs have many of the characteristics of folk songs as well as hymns. Some are monophonic, while others are set in two to four parts of usually non-imitative polyphony. The monodic songs can be sung as two- or threefold canons. The relative simplicity, the dance rhythm, and the strong melodies of the songs have given the music collected in the Red Book a lasting appeal, and these songs are some of the most frequently recorded pieces of early music.

== Surviving songs ==
The ten songs in the collection that survive are:

1. Song: O Virgo Splendens (fol. 21−v22) ("O Splendid Virgin")
2. Virelai/danse: Stella Splendens (fol. 22r) ("Splendid Star")
3. Song: Laudemus Virginem (fol. 23) ("Let us praise the Virgin")
4. Song: Splendens Ceptigera (fol. 23) ("Splendid ruler")
5. Virelai: Mariam, Matrem Virginem, Attolite (fol. 25r) ("Praise Mary, the virgin mother")
6. Virelai/danse: Polorum Regina (fol. 24v) ("Queen of the Heavens")
7. Virelai: Cuncti Simus Concanentes (fol. 24) ("Let us sing together")
8. Ballad/danse: Los Set Gotxs (fol. 23v) ("The seven joys")
9. Motet: Imperayritz de la ciutat joyosa / Verges ses par misericordiosa (fol. 25v) ("Empress of the happy city" / "Virgin, out of mercy")
10. Virelai: Ad Mortem Festinamus (fol. 26v) ("We hasten towards death")

Many performers have performed these songs; some of the more noteworthy performances have been by Jordi Savall and Hespèrion XX, Micrologus, Studio der Frühen Musik, and Ensemble Unicorn.

== Modern recordings ==
- 1971 - Music of Catalonia in the 14th Century: Llibre Vermell de Montserrat. Atrium Musicae
- 1979 - Llibre Vermell de Montserrat. A fourteenth century pilgrimage. Hespèrion XX, Jordi Savall
- 1990 - Llibre Vermell De Montserrat. Ensemble Ecclesia (Tecla, FPD012)
- 1992 - Llibre Vermell - Pilgrim Songs & Dances. New London Consort, Philip Pickett
- 1994 - Llibre Vermell De Montserrat. Sarband, Osnabrücker Jugend Chor
- 1995 - Llibre Vermell de Montserrat - Cantigas de Santa Maria. Alla Francesca
- 1996 - "Los set goyts" and "Imperayritz de la ciutat joyosa" recorded by Angelo Branduardi in the album Futuro antico.
- 2007 - Llibre Vermell. Choeur de chambre de Namur, Psallentes, Les Pastoureaux, Millenarium, directed by Christophe Deslignes. RIC 260.
- 2001 - Un Llibre Vermell, chants et danses des pèlerins de Montserrat. Camerata Vocale de Brive; Ens. Le Concert dans l'Oeuf; Capella Silvanensis, Directed by Jean-Michel Hasler. Collection Romane CR 106
- 2016 - Llibre Vermell de Montserrat. La Capella Reial de Catalunya, Hespèrion XXI, Jordi Savall.

== Media ==
- Mariam matrem virginem (MIDI file)

== See also ==
- Cantigas de Santa Maria, similar musical manuscript compiled during the reign of Alfonso X of Castile.
