= Piffaro =

Piffaro may refer to:

- Piffero, a double reed musical instrument with a conical bore
- Piffaro, The Renaissance Band, an early music ensemble in Philadelphia
