= Eurovision Choir 2019 =

Music competition

Date and venue
- Final: 3 August 2019
- Venue: Partille Arena; Gothenburg, Sweden

Organisation
- Organiser: European Broadcasting Union (EBU)
- Executive supervisor: Jon Ola Sand

Production
- Host broadcaster: Sveriges Television (SVT)
- Director: Peter Maniura
- Executive producer: Ieva Rozentāle
- Musical director: Fred Sjöberg
- Presenters: Petroc Trelawny; Ella Petersson

Participants
- Number of entries: 10
- Debuting countries: Norway; Scotland; Sweden; Switzerland
- Non-returning countries: Austria; Estonia; Hungary
- Participation map: Participating countries Did not qualify from the semi-final Countries that participated in the past but not in 2019

Vote
- Voting system: Jury voting by a panel of three judges to decide the winning choir
- Winning choir: Denmark; Vocal Line

Eurovision Choir 2019 was the second Eurovision Choir competition for choral singers, organised by the European Broadcasting Union (EBU) and Interkultur Foundation. It was held on 3 August 2019, at the Partille Arena, in Partille Municipality, Metropolitan Gothenburg, Sweden. The event, presented by Petroc Trelawny and Ella Petersson, was produced by Swedish host broadcaster Sveriges Television (SVT) together with an international team of EBU members, the European Choir Games and the City of Gothenburg.

Ten countries participated, including debutants Norway, Scotland, Switzerland and the hosts Sweden while Austria, Estonia and Hungary decided to withdraw. Three of the ten choirs advanced to the second round: Latvia, Denmark, and Slovenia, all of which took part in the inaugural edition in 2017. Vocal Line of Denmark won the contest, with Latvia and Slovenia placing second and third respectively.

== Location ==
After initial reports in February 2018, it was confirmed on 8 July 2018 that the second edition of the Eurovision Choir would be held in the Swedish city of Gothenburg. The proposed venue was the 14,000-seat Scandinavium arena. However, on 18 December 2018, it was confirmed that Partille Arena would host the competition.

== Format ==
Competing countries who are members of the European Broadcasting Union (EBU) are eligible to participate in Eurovision Choir. Ten countries participated at the second edition of the contest. Each competing country was represented by a professional choir, and in the first round each performed a choral piece lasting no more than four minutes in length. Each piece may include singular or several musical works or of a free genre; but must contain national or regional influence from the participating country. Three choirs are invited to perform a second, 3 minute set after which the winner is announced.

The winning choir were presented with a trophy and awarded with a trip to attend the 11th edition of the World Choir Games held in Flanders, Belgium in July 2020.

=== Performances ===
The show opened with a performance by twenty one choirs from across Västra Götaland County, and all ten participating choirs performed "Mamma Mia" by ABBA during the flag parade. For the two intervals, the mass choir performed "Without You" by Avicii with Madelene Johansson after the first round, followed by 2017 winners Carmen Manet performing alongside Bohuslän Big Band after the second. At the end of the show all the choirs performed two further ABBA songs, "Dancing Queen" and "Thank You for the Music" both with Johansson.

=== Presenters ===
On 5 April 2019, it was announced that British classical music radio and television broadcaster, Petroc Trelawny and Swedish culture presenter Ella Petersson would host the 2019 competition. Trelawny’s career started at BBC Radio Devon in 1989 as a reporter and, since 1998, he has been a presenter at BBC Radio 3. Trelawny hosted the Eurovision Young Musicians 2018 at the Usher Hall in Edinburgh alongside Josie D'Arby. Petersson is currently the presenter of Kulturstudion on SVT2, and Kulturfrågan Kontrapunkt on SVT1.

== Participating countries ==
The official list of participants was published on 18 December 2018 and included nine countries. Belgium, Germany, Latvia, Slovenia and Wales participated again after making their debuts at the inaugural edition in 2017. Norway, Scotland, host country Sweden and Switzerland took part for the first time, while Austria, Estonia and Hungary withdrew from the competition.

On 20 March 2019, it was announced that Denmark would ultimately participate for a second time, raising the number of participants to ten. Romania and France were originally announced as debut participants but were later removed from the official list published by the EBU. Both Austria and Hungary took part in the 2017 contest, but did not return for 2019.

=== Returning artists ===
Nicolas Dorian, conductor of the Belgian entry, had previously represented Belgium in the Eurovision Song Contest 2011 as part of Witloof Bay, also appearing in 2015 as a backing singer for Loïc Nottet.

=== First round ===
Participants of first round
R/O	Country	Broadcaster	Choir	Song(s)	Language(s)	Conductor
1	Sweden	SVT	Zero8	"Khorumi"	Swedish	Rasmus Krigström
1	Sweden	SVT	Zero8	"Hej, dunkom så länge vi levom"	Swedish	Rasmus Krigström
2	Belgium	RTBF	Almakalia	"Made in Belgium" (medley)	English / French	Nicolas Dorian
3	Latvia	LTV	Babīte Municipality Mixed Choir Maska	"Pērkontēvs"	Latvian / English	Jānis Ozols
4	Germany	WDR	BonnVoice	"O Täler weit"	German	Tono Wissing
4	Germany	WDR	BonnVoice	"Die Gedanken sind frei"	German	Tono Wissing
5	Norway	NRK	Volve Vokal	"Ønskediktet"	Norwegian	Gro Espedal
6	Denmark	DR	Vocal Line	"True North"	English	Jens Johansen
7	Scotland	BBC Alba	Alba	"Cumha na Cloinne"	Scottish Gaelic	Joy Dunlop
7	Scotland	BBC Alba	Alba	"Ach a' Mhairead"	Scottish Gaelic	Joy Dunlop
7	Scotland	BBC Alba	Alba	"Alba"	Scottish Gaelic	Joy Dunlop
8	Slovenia	RTVSLO	Jazzva	"Spomenčice"	Slovene	Jasna Žitnik
9	Switzerland	RTS	Cake O’Phonie	"Chante en mon cœur"	French / Italian / Swiss German / Romansh / Patois	Antoine Krattinger
9	Switzerland	RTS	Cake O’Phonie	"La sera sper il lag"	French / Italian / Swiss German / Romansh / Patois	Antoine Krattinger
9	Switzerland	RTS	Cake O’Phonie	"Poi"	French / Italian / Swiss German / Romansh / Patois	Antoine Krattinger
9	Switzerland	RTS	Cake O’Phonie	"Le ranz des vaches"	French / Italian / Swiss German / Romansh / Patois	Antoine Krattinger
9	Switzerland	RTS	Cake O’Phonie	"La ticinella"	French / Italian / Swiss German / Romansh / Patois	Antoine Krattinger
9	Switzerland	RTS	Cake O’Phonie	"Beresinaliedet"	French / Italian / Swiss German / Romansh / Patois	Antoine Krattinger
9	Switzerland	RTS	Cake O’Phonie	"Chanson d'ici"	French / Italian / Swiss German / Romansh / Patois	Antoine Krattinger
10	Wales	S4C	Ysgol Gerdd Ceredigion	"Cúnla"	Irish	Islwyn Evans
10	Wales	S4C	Ysgol Gerdd Ceredigion	"Ar Lan y Môr"	Welsh	Islwyn Evans

=== Second round ===
Three choirs advanced to the second round and performed a second, 3 minute set, after which the winner was announced.

Participants of second round and results
R/O	Country	Broadcaster	Choir	Song	Language(s)	Conductor	Pl.
1	Latvia	LTV	Babīte Municipality Mixed Choir Maska	"Come, God!"	Latvian	Jānis Ozols	2
2	Denmark	DR	Vocal Line	"Viola"	Danish	Jens Johansen	1
3	Slovenia	RTVSLO	Jazzva	"Fly, Little Bird"	Slovene	Jasna Žitnik	3

=== Other countries ===
- Estonia – On 16 November 2018, Estonian broadcaster Eesti Rahvusringhääling (ERR) confirmed that they would withdraw from the contest.
- France – French broadcaster France Télévisions was originally announced as a debut participant but later withdrew from the competition due to logistical problems with the selected choir.
- Romania – Despite their participation being initially confirmed, on 18 December 2018 the final list of countries did not include Romania. It was later revealed that the Romanian broadcaster Televiziunea Română (TVR) had declined an invitation to participate.
- Spain – Radiotelevisión Española (RTVE) confirmed to news outlet ESCplus España that they would not broadcast the contest in any way, but that they were considering a 2021 debut depending on the time they have to prepare the entry and the interest.

== International broadcasts and voting ==
=== Commentators ===
Most of the participating countries sent commentators to Gothenburg or commentated from their own country, in order to add insight to the participants.

Broadcasters and commentators in participating countries
Country	Broadcaster(s)	Commentator(s)	Ref.
Belgium	Musiq'3, La Trois	French: Patrick Leterme	
Denmark	DR1	Ole Tøpholm and Phillip Faber	
Germany	WDR Fernsehen	Peter Urban	
Latvia	LTV1	Kristīne Komarovska and Jānis Holšteins-Upmanis	
Norway	NRK1 (delayed); NRK Klassisk (live)	Arild Erikstad	
Scotland	BBC Alba	Tony Kearney	
Slovenia	RTV SLO1	Igor Velše	
Sweden	SVT2	No commentary	
Switzerland	RTS Un	French: Jean-Marc Richard and Philippe Savoy	
Wales	S4C	Morgan Jones	

Broadcasters and commentators in non-participating countries
Country	Broadcaster(s)	Commentator(s)	Ref.
France	France 2 (broadcast on 5 August 2020)	No commentary	

=== Professional jury ===
The winner of the contest was decided upon the votes from a professional jury, which was made up of the following:

- (Sweden) Katarina Henryson – singer and composer, founding member of a cappella ensemble, The Real Group
- (United Kingdom) John Rutter – composer and conductor, was also a judge in 2017
- (United States) Deke Sharon – singer, director, producer, composer and arranger

The jury was asked to score on the technical skill and accuracy of the choir, the quality of their sound, their musicianship and interpretation and the communication of the piece they performed.
