= Hannah Ild =

Estonian singer

Hannah
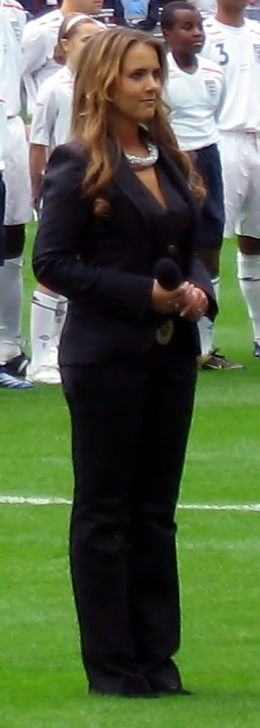
- Ild at Wembley Stadium in 2008

Background information
- Also known as: Hanna Ild, Hannah Ild
- Born: Hanna Pruuli; 12 May 1981 (age 45); Tallinn, then part of Estonian SSR, Soviet Union
- Occupation: Singer-songwriter
- Instrument: Piano
- Years active: 1997–present

Hannah Ild (née Pruuli; born 12 May 1981), known professionally as Hannah, is an Estonian songwriter, singer, and pianist of ballads and classic pop.

== Early life and education ==
Ild's interest in music began at an early age. She began singing even before she could speak. When she was three years old, she joined the Children Music Studio. From there she went on to join the Estonian Radio Singing Studio. When she was seven, Hannah Ild joined the elite Estonian TV Girls' Choir. At the same time she also began to attend the Tallinn Music School. Here she realized her talent for playing piano. By the time she was thirteen, she had produced her first song called "Childhood Land", composing lyrics and music together, which won first place in the Estonian Children's Song Competition in 1995. She went on to produce more songs entirely of her own creation.

Hannah studied media and advertising at Tallinn University (Media and Advertising) and organizes events.

== Music career ==
In 1997, Hannah Ild left the TV choir and began her solo career. She came in second place in the Estonian selection for the Eurovision Song Contest, performing her own song "Lonely Soul". The jury of the Estonian Association of the Phonogram Producers awarded Hannah's song "Salaja" with the Dance Hit of the Year 2001. The jury nominated her twice for an Estonian Music Award in the category "Female Artist of the Year" in 2003 and 2004, but she did not win. The Estonian Music and Phonogram Producers Union awarded Hannah with the Golden Record prize of the biggest selling Estonian "Female Performer of the Year 2003".

For her next album Ballaadid 2, Hannah's record label, owned by her husband, launched a $200,000–$250,000 promotion campaign. The Estonian music managers called this a "crazy experiment" considering 1.4 million people as the size of the targeted market. This accounted as the biggest budget for advertising an Estonian album in history. The buyers of the albums participated in a drawing lot of a Mercedes-Benz A-Class as the main prize. After the car was handed out to the winner, the sales numbers for the album dropped. The campaign earned Hannah Ild two Golden Record awards in Estonia: the biggest selling "Album of the Year 2005" and the biggest selling "Female Performer of the Year 2005".

=== Performance at England vs. Estonia football match ===
Hannah Ild performed in Euro 2008 qualification match between England and Estonia in Wembley Stadium on 13 October 2007. She sang the national anthems of both countries before the match. England won the game 3:0, with goals by Wright-Phillips, Rooney and Rähn (own goal).

== Charity concerts ==
- January 2004 – Charity Concert for a children's orphanage in Valga, South-Estonia.
- March 2004 – Concert for a boy, who required an urgent operation to restore hearing after meningitis attack (the operation was successful).
- May 2004 – Art Auction organised by Hannah to assist in the education of and recreational facilities for poor children of large families.
- December 2004 – three televised major concerts accompanied by the Estonian National Symphony Orchestra to make possible a series of operations on Zanna, an orphan born with a seriously distorted face. A television appeal accompanied the concerts.
- December 2004 – Concert with symphony orchestra in aid of Estonia orphans (700 orphans attended).
- February 2005 – major charity concert with "Zonta" foundation to help orphans throughout Estonia to access advanced education.
- February 2005 – Charity Concert for a children's orphanage in South-Estonia.

== Albums ==
=== Salaja ===
In 2001 came Hannah Ild's debut album Salaja. This was a huge success – especially the lead song "Salaja" ("Secretly") – becoming the greatest hit in Estonian pop history. The Album won the Estonian Music Award in the category of the Dance Hit of the Year. "Salaja" was nominated in five categories from a jury in 2001 – Female Artist of the Year, Newcomer of the Year, Dance Hit of the Year, Radio Hit of the Year and Best Dance Artist of the Year.

=== Ballads ===
The 28 November 2002 saw Hannah Ild releasing her new album Ballads – unplugged, acoustic version – comprising fifteen songs, all with Hannah Ild singing her own compositions accompanied, in some, by the cello. All songs were composed, produced, performed and piano accompanied by Hannah Ild.

=== Ballads 2 ===
In the beginning of 2004 Hannah began recording her fourth CD, accompanied by a symphonic orchestra. All songs written, performed and produced by Hannah Ild.

=== Fly Away ===
In July 2003 came out Hannah Ild's third Album Fly Away – dance style songs, all composed, produced and performed by her. In addition "Fly Away", "Once More" and "Hoping" are currently released as singles. "Hoping" went to first place in the Top 40. In the beginning of 2004 Hannah began recording her fourth CD. All songs written, performed and produced by Hannah Ild.

=== Hannah Live ===
In November 2005 she released her fifth CD – Hannah Live – a double Best of concert CD of Hannah's songs.

=== Everything is Changing ===
Ild released her album Everything in Changing on 8 October 2007; all songs composed by Hannah Ild with production and arrangement by James McMillan.

== Awards and achievements ==
- Estonian Music Awards Dance Hit of the Year 2001
- Estonian Pop Music Annual Awards Golden Record "Female Performer of the Year" 2003
- Estonian Pop Music Annual Awards Golden Record "Female Performer of the Year" 2005
- Estonian Pop Music Annual Awards Golden Record "Album of the Year" 2005
