= Piffaro, The Renaissance Band =

Piffaro, The Renaissance Band, originally called "The Philadelphia Renaissance Wind Band", is a Philadelphia-based early music ensemble.

== History ==
The group was founded in 1980, and performs music of the late Medieval and Renaissance periods. Piffaro's instrumentarium includes shawms, dulcians, sackbuts, recorders, krumhorns, bagpipes, lutes, guitars, and a variety of percussion.

Piffaro generally performs a concert series of four to five concerts a year in Philadelphia, in addition to touring throughout the United States, Canada, Europe and elsewhere. They regularly perform onstage with the Washington Christmas Revels. The ensemble also has extensive recordings with Deutsche Grammophon, Dorian Recordings, Newport Classic, Navona Records, and under their own label. The group's founding artistic directors were Joan Kimball and Robert Wiemken. Priscilla Herreid became artistic director beginning with the 2022-2023 concert season.

Regular members are Priscilla Herreid, Grant Herreid, Greg Ingles, and Erik Schmalz. Tom Zajac was a regular member until his death in August 2015. Joan Kimball and Robert Wiemkem retired in 2022.

Early Music America has awarded Piffaro's founders and co-artistic directors, Joan Kimball and Robert Wiemken, their 2021 Howard Mayer Brown Award for lifetime achievement in the field of early music.

== Selected recordings ==
- Obrecht: Chansons-Songs-Motets, Capilla Flamenca, Piffaro (Eufoda EUF1361)
- Music from the Odhecaton, Piffaro (Dorian XCD 90301)
- Stadtpfeiffer: Music of Renaissance Germany, Piffaro (Dorian XCD-90292)
- Chansons et Danceries - French Renaissance Winds, Piffaro (Deutsche Grammophon DGG 4471072)
- Los Ministriles: Wind Music of the Spanish Renaissance, Piffaro (Archiv 4543441–2)

== Sources ==
- Description and discography on the Goldberg Early Music Portal (Archived version on archive.org retrieved 27 May 2015)
- University of Wisconsin–Madison, Madison Early Music Festival 2007, Artists-in-Residence (Retrieved 4 November 2007)
- Daniel Webster, "Piffaro performs Renaissance airs with a fine flourish", The Philadelphia Inquirer, October 30, 2007 (Retrieved 27 May 2015)
