= Psallentes =

Psallentes ("those who sing") is a Gregorian chant ensemble founded in 2000 and based in Leuven, Belgium.

== Members ==
Psallentes consists of singers Conor Biggs, Lieven Deroo, Pieter Coene, Paul Schils and Philippe Souvagie and is directed by Hendrik Vanden Abeele.

Psallentes has a lifelong association with early music ensembles Capilla Flamenca and Millenarium, with whom they made several recordings.

In 2007, Hendrik Vanden Abeele founded Psallentes Feminae ("Psallentes Ladies"), consisting of Sarah Abrams, Helen Cassano, Lieselot De Wilde, Rozelien Nys, Rein Van Bree, Kerlijne Van Nevel and Veerle Van Roosbroeck.

== Repertoire ==
Psallentes focuses on Late Medieval and Renaissance plainsong and related polyphony. From careful investigation and extensive use of original manuscripts, Psallentes gather evidence on how this music was performed. Hendrik Vanden Abeele's research at the university of Leiden focuses on the thorny and controversial problem of rhythm, memory as the major requisite for a good singer of chant, and the voice as a research tool. Interactions between research and performance result in ‘authentic’ as well as more present-day interpretations of plainsong.

== Discography ==
- 2001 - Arnold de Lantins: Missa Verbum Incarnatum. Capilla Flamenca with Psallentes, Clari Cantuli and Oltremontano. Ricercar 207.
- 2002 - Pierre de la Rue: Missa de septem doloribus. Capilla Flamenca and Psallentes. Musique en Wallonie 0207. .
- 2002 - Musica Reservata. Endangered Sounds. Capilla Flamenca and Psallentes. Alamire Foundation 2002.
- 2005 - Pierre de la Rue: Missa Ave Maria, Vespers. Capilla Flamenca and Psallentes. MEW 0633.
- 2006 - Carmina Burana - Officium Lusorum. Choeur de chambre de Namur, Psallentes, Chœur d'enfants de l'école de musique de Forbach. RIC 247.
- 2006 - Etienne de Liège. In festo sanctissimae trinitatis. Psallentes. RIC 249
- 2007 - Llibre Vermell. Choeur de chambre de Namur, Psallentes, Les Pastoureaux, Millenarium, directed by Christophe Deslignes. RIC 260.
