= Tippit =

Traditional Welsh game

Tippit is a Welsh game played with a single coin, that dates back hundreds of years. Similar games - including Up Jenkins - are played elsewhere in Europe and the United States.

== The game ==
The game is played using a small coin. Two teams of three face each other across a table and toss the coin to decide who goes first. The winning team members put their hands under the table and move the coin unseen between the three pairs of hands. When ready, the centre player knocks three times on the underside of the table and all three pairs of clenched fists (one containing the coin) are placed on the table. The opposing team, who can confer, must then attempt to find the coin in the following manner.

The person who is trying to find the Tippit taps the hand of an opponent and says either:-

- "Take your left/right hand away". The tapped opponent opens the hand specified and if the coin is not there, the person puts the hand by their side. If the Tippit is revealed, then the team hiding the Tippit have won the round. They score one point and get to hide the Tippit amongst themselves again.
- "Tippit in your left/right". The tapped opponent opens their hand to show whether or not the coin is there. If the Tippit is revealed, then the team searching for the Tippit wins the coin. They score no points but get the opportunity to hide the coin. If the Tippit is not in the fist mentioned, then the searcher has lost and the team with the Tippit scores a point and gets to hide it all over again - once they have revealed who really had it all along.

Games are usually played until one team reaches a score of 11.

There are minor regional variations in command words and game length but these rules remain essentially the same wherever the game is played.

== Tactics ==
The point of the game is that the team hiding the Tippit wants to make the opposing team guess the wrong fist. The game gets very tactical particularly in choosing in which hand to place the tippit and particularly skillful players play like good poker players, hiding their emotions or even trying to mislead their opponents using facial gestures, body language and verbal banter. The team guessing can often make an inexperienced player reveal the whereabouts by staring into their eyes or even visually examining hand positions.

== Competitive play ==
A world championship is held in mid Wales each year. The game is still played in the pubs of mid Wales particularly around Rhayader, and parts of Herefordshire and Gloucestershire.

In 2006, Welsh television station S4C produced a gameshow based around the game, called Tipit.
