= Sgorio =

Welsh-language football TV show

- Title card
- Presented by: Dylan Ebenezer; Owain Tudur Jones; Malcolm Allen; John Hartson; Nicky John
- Country of origin: United Kingdom (Wales)
- Original language: Welsh

Production
- Running time: Varies
- Production company: Rondo Media

Original release
- Network: S4C
- Release: 5 September 1988 – present

Sgorio (Welsh for 'To Score') is a Welsh-language football television programme produced by Rondo Media for S4C. First broadcast on 5 September 1988, it is one of S4C's longest-running shows and renowned for its coverage of European football, but for the first few years the show also featured highlights of rallying, rugby league, hurling, gaelic football, ice hockey and climbing.

In the days before cable or satellite television services, the success of Sgorio extended beyond Wales' border as football fans in England tuned in to watch the programme with Spain's La Liga featuring alongside Italy's Serie A and latterly, Germany's Bundesliga.

Since 2008, Sgorio has also broadcast a live Welsh Premier League match each weekend with the Monday evening programme featuring highlights from both the Welsh Premier and Spain's La Liga.

== History ==
The idea for a programme covering European football was conceived by Caernarfon-based independent production company, Ffilmiau'r Nant, to coincide with Ian Rush's transfer from Liverpool to Juventus and Mark Hughes' move from Manchester United to Barcelona. By the time the programme started, both players had returned to their English clubs.

The first programme was presented by former Swansea RFC and Wales winger, Arthur Emyr and included the Barcelona derby between Barcelona and Espanyol at the Nou Camp, the All-Ireland Senior Hurling Championship between Galway and Tipperary, tennis from Cincinnati featuring Stefan Edberg and Mats Wilander, badminton from Hong Kong and a USSR v Australia basketball match.

=== European football ===
In the early 1990s, S4C decided the programme should concentrate solely on European football highlights, with the German Bundesliga being added to La Liga and Serie A, and in 1997, the El Clásico between Real Madrid and Barcelona was shown live on S4C with former Wales assistant manager, Osian Roberts as one of the studio guests.

Sgorio has also broadcast highlights from the Dutch Eredivisie, Ligue 1 in France and the Portuguese Primeira Liga at various times since the first series. European coverage has been scaled back heavily since around 2006, though brief highlights of La Liga continue to feature on the Monday evening show.

As well as Welsh international football matches, S4C has also aired live matches from the UEFA Champions League, UEFA Europa League, FA Cup and FA Trophy under the Sgorio banner.

=== Presenters ===
Arthur Emyr was the show's first presenter, but when he left the programme in 1995 Amanda Protheroe-Thomas took over, becoming one of the first female football anchors on television. In 2002 Morgan Jones took over as the presenter before becoming the show's Saturday afternoon presenter in 2008 alongside Malcolm Allen with Nic Parry and Alun Williams taking over the Monday night programme.

In 2010 Dylan Ebenezer joined the team as a presenter and commentator with former Celtic and Wales striker, John Hartson also joining the team as a pundit. Four years later, reporter Nicky John became the programme's lead anchor.

=== Criticism ===
On 14 December 2009, an edition of Sgorio got the lowest rating in S4C's history, when it recorded a 'zero rating' (fewer than 2,500 viewers), according to the Broadcasters' Audience Research Board (BARB).
