= Splendens Ceptigera =

Splendens Ceptigera ("Splendid ruler") is a monodic song (fol. 21v-22) from the Llibre Vermell de Montserrat, one of the oldest extant medieval manuscripts containing music. The text is: "Splendens ceptigera, Nostrisis advocata, Virgo puerpera. Tundentes pectora, crimina confitentes, Simus altissimo."

In modern times it has been recorded by many artists:

- Jordi Savall, Hespèrion XX (album Llibre Vermell de Montserrat - siglo XIV, 1978)
- New London Consort directed by Philip Pickett (album Llibre vermell, pilgrim songs & dances, 1992)
- Ensemble Anonymus (album Llibre vermell, 1993)
- Gothart (album Stella splendens, 1997)
- Studio der Frühen Musik directed by Thomas Binkley (album Secular music c1300, 1998)
- Companyia Elèctrica Dharma (album Llibre Vermell, 2002)
- Ensemble Micrologus (album Llibre Vermell de Montserrat, 2002)
- Sarband & Osnabrücker Jugendchor (album Llibre Vermell, 2002)
- Choeur de Chambre de Namur (album Llibre Vermell, 2007)
- Ensemble Kantika (album Estel de mar, 2009)
