= Arnold de Lantins =

Netherlandish composer

Arnold de Lantins (fl. 1420s – before 2 July 1432) was a Netherlandish composer of the late medieval and early Renaissance eras. He is one of a few composers who shows aspects of both medieval and Renaissance style, and was a contemporary of Dufay during Dufay's sojourn in Italy.

Very little is known about his life, except for a few years in the 1420s to around 1430. It is presumed that he was from Flanders or adjacent areas. In the early 1420s he was probably in the service of the Malatesta family in either Rimini or Pesaro, since Dufay mentioned him in the text of a rondeau which was written between 1420 and 1424. Lantins was in Venice in 1428 and Rome in 1431, in the latter city as a singer in the papal chapel choir, along with Dufay. He was only in Rome six months; after that he disappears from history. Rome was entering a period of turmoil related to the Conciliar movement after the death, in February 1431, of Pope Martin V; many musicians left at that time or shortly after, and Lantins may have been one of them.

It is not known for certain if Arnold de Lantins was a relative of Hugo de Lantins, a composer active at the same time, but since their works often appear together in collections and they seem to have been in the same geographical regions, it is not unlikely. However, a sharp stylistic difference between the works of the two composers shows they can not be the same person. Earlier theories that there was a third "de Lantins," a certain Ray de Lantins, known from a single inscription in Munich, Bayerische Staatsbibliothek Mus. 3224, were shown to be wrong in 2012 by Margaret Bent and Robert Klugseder, upon the discovery of a second, fuller inscription to "Raynaldus de lantins" of a Credo ascribed to Arnold de Lantins in two other sources. This ascription makes it extremely likely that Ray should be read as a variant of Arnold.

Lantins' music was held in high regard, and appears alongside that of Dufay, Gilles Binchois and Johannes Ciconia in contemporary manuscript collections. In particular, one motet – Tota pulchra es – is found in widely distributed sources; since this was before the advent of printing technology, wide distribution of copies is taken as evidence of a composer's fame and popularity. Arnold wrote a complete mass, found in Bologna Q15 (all the movements are found in OX 213 although the last two movements are separated – only the first three movements are found in Bologna 2216), as well as several parts of a composite mass in Bologna Q15, augmenting movements written by Johannes Ciconia. Several other examples exist of composers adding movements to partial masses written by other composers, for example Zacara da Teramo, particularly in Bologna Q15. Musically Arnold's mass movements are fairly simple, using three voices, head motif technique, and avoiding imitative writing. Some of his other sacred music, such as his Marian motets, contain florid melodic writing and some use of imitation.

He also wrote secular music, including ballades and rondeaux, all of which are in French, as well as a few shorter sacred pieces. Some of them refer to specific events or specific people, but none of either have been conclusively identified.

== Recordings ==
- Arnold de Lantins, Missa Verbum Incarnatum, Ricercar CD RIC 207, by the Capilla Flamenca, Psallentes and Clari Cantuli. Also contains the motet O pulcherrina mulierum, as well as music by Johannes Brassart and Johannes Cesaris.
- Listen to a free recording of a song from Umeå Akademiska Kör.

== References and further reading ==
- Article "Arnold de Lantins", in The New Grove Dictionary of Music and Musicians, ed. Stanley Sadie. 20 vol. London, Macmillan Publishers Ltd., 1980. ISBN 1-56159-174-2
- Gustave Reese, Music in the Renaissance. New York, W.W. Norton & Co., 1954. ISBN 0-393-09530-4
- Schoop, Hans; Allsen, J. Michael. L. Macy (ed.). Arnold de Lantins. Grove Music Online. (subscription required)
- Planchart, Alejandro. L. Macy (ed.). Guillaume Du Fay. Grove Music Online. (subscription required)
- Lidia Kućmierz, "Construction of music in non-mass works of Arnold de Lantins", Master Thesis, Jagiellonian University of Cracow, Faculty of History, Cracow 1995
