= Xiaomi Arena =

Indoor arena in Riga, Latvia

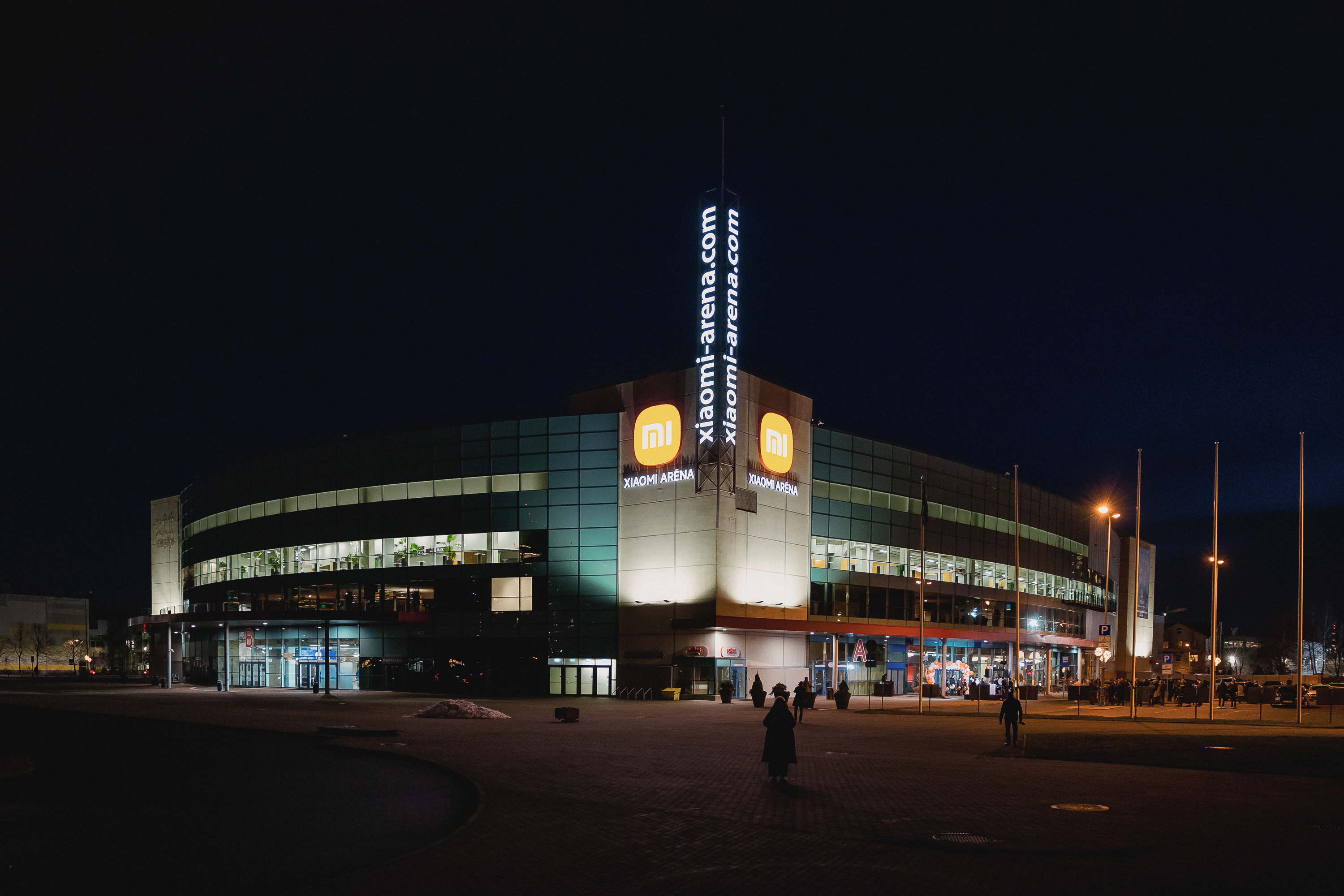
- Xiaomi Arena in 2025
- Interactive map of Xiaomi Arena
- Former names: Arena Riga (2006–2025)
- Location: Riga, Latvia
- Coordinates: 56°58′5″N 24°7′17″E
- Owner: Glesum Investments
- Capacity: 14,500 (concerts); 11,200 (basketball); 10,300 (ice hockey)

Construction
- Groundbreaking: 17 June 2004
- Built: 1 February 2006
- Opened: 15 February 2006
- Cost: Ls 20 million EUR € 28.5 million
- Architects: SCI Architects; SIA Merks; SIA Nams
- General contractor: SIA Merks

Tenants
- Latvia men's national ice hockey team (2006–present); Latvia men's national basketball team (2006–present); Latvia women's national basketball team (2006–present); Dinamo Riga (KHL) (2008–2022); BC VEF Rīga (2009–present); Riga Masters (snooker) (2014–2019); LNK Fight Night (2017–2020); Barons LMT (BBL/LBL) (2006–2009); ASK Riga (BBL/LBL) (2006–2009); BC Prometey (Eurocup) (2022–2024)

Website
- https://xiaomi-arena.com/

Xiaomi Arena, formerly known as Arena Riga (Latvian: Xiaomi Arēna) is an indoor arena in Riga, Latvia. It is primarily used for ice hockey, basketball and concerts. Arena holds a maximum of 14,500 and was opened on 15 February 2006.

It was built to be used as one of the venues for the 2006 IIHF World Championship, the other being Skonto Arena. The arena was designed by the Canadian company Stadium Consultants International (SCI Architects) and Latvian firms SIA Merks and SIA Nams.

In 2025, as part of a partnership agreement between Arena Riga's management and Chinese electronics company Xiaomi, the arena was rebranded as the Xiaomi Arena as part of a naming rights deal.

The owner of the arena is the company Glesum Investments, but the real beneficiary is businessman Juris Savickis.

== History ==
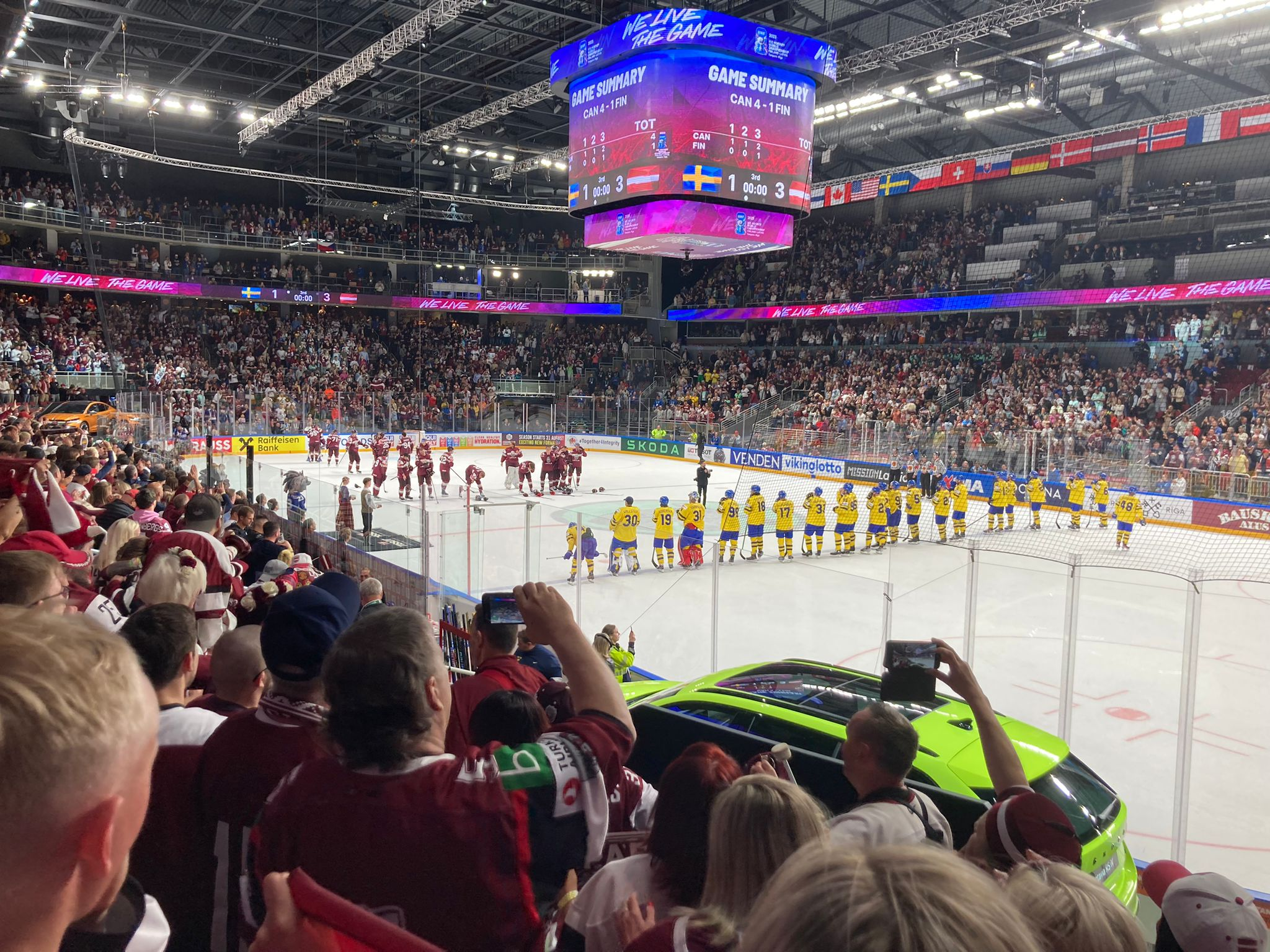
Ice hockey match between Latvia and Sweden during IIHF WC 2023

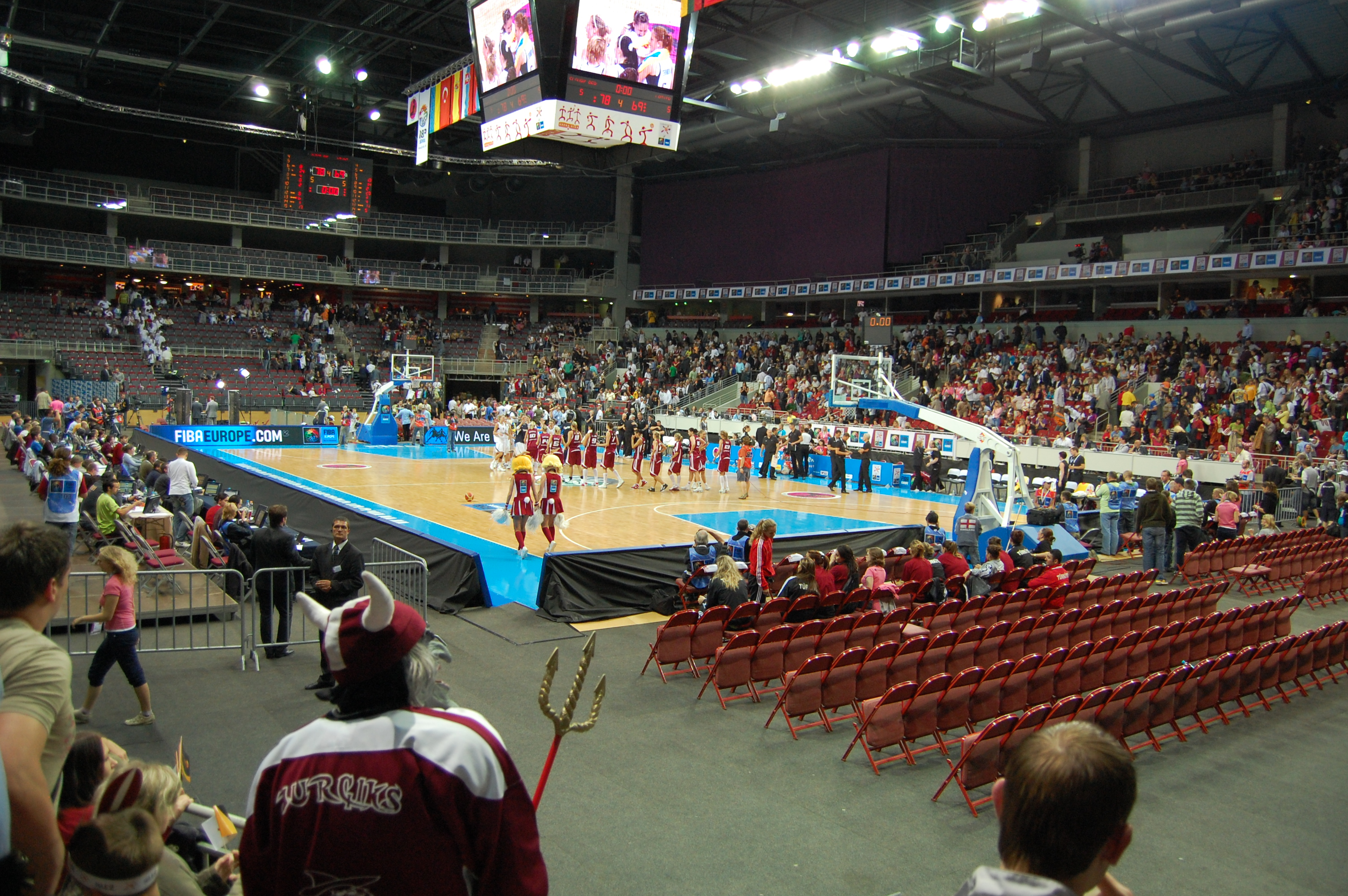
Arena Riga during EuroBasket Women 2009.

The 11,000-seat arena was constructed as a requirement for hosting the 2006 IIHF World Championship. Its construction overseen by Latvian Ice Hockey Federation president Kirovs Lipmans was delayed due to disagreements on the construction contract and finding an investor to fund the project. The Baltic Times reported that Lipmans was to blame for the delays, and that he was asked to resign for a conflict of interest in owning shares in the arena's management company.

It has been home to the Latvian national ice hockey team ever since and the Kontinental Hockey League club Dinamo Riga since 2008, as well as the Latvian men's and women's national basketball teams since 2006.

During the years the arena has also hosted many well-known artists from all over the world. A part of the events of the 2006 NATO Summit also took place in the venue.

The arena hosted the matches of EuroBasket Women 2009, EuroBasket Women 2019 and 'D' group of Eurobasket 2015.

The arena hosted matches for the EuroBasket 2025 including the final phase.

It also hosted matches for the UEFA Futsal Euro 2026 including a quarter final.

== Notable events ==
- 2006 IIHF World Championship
- Sensation White 2007
- IIHF Continental Cup 2008
- 2008 IIHF World Junior Ice Hockey Championships – Division I
- EuroBasket Women 2009
- Dinamo Riga vs. Phoenix Coyotes 2010
- 2011 FIBA Under-19 World Championship
- 2012 Kontinental Hockey League All-Star Game
- 2013 FIBA Europe Under-18 Championship
- 8th World Choir Games 2014
- EuroBasket 2015
- 2016 European Wrestling Championships
- 2016 Men's World Floorball Championships
- Eurovision Choir of the Year 2017
- World Boxing Super Series 2017–18, 2018–19
- 2018 IIHF World U18 Championships – Division I A
- 2018 FIBA Europe Under-18 Championship
- 2019 UEFA Under-19 Futsal Championship
- EuroBasket Women 2019 (partially held in Serbia)
- 2019 Fed Cup (Latvia vs Germany)
- 2021 IIHF World Championship
- 2021 FIBA Under-19 Basketball World Cup
- 2022 UEFA Futsal Champions League Finals
- 2023 Davis Cup (Latvia vs Israel)
- 2023 IIHF World Championship (partially held in Finland)
- 2024 FIBA Men's Olympic Qualifying Tournaments – Riga
- EuroBasket 2025
- UEFA Futsal Euro 2026
- Supernova 2027
- 2030 IIHF World Championship (partially held in Finland)

== Concerts in Arena Riga ==
- 2Cellos
- 50 Cent
- Thirty Seconds to Mars
- A-ha
- Adam Tensta
- Al Bano
- Alla Pugacheva
- Apocalyptica
- Avril Lavigne
- Backstreet Boys
- Bastille
- Billy Idol
- Björk
- Bryan Adams
- Bonnie Tyler
- Chris Norman
- Chris Rea
- Citi Zēni
- Combichrist
- David Guetta
- DDT
- Deep Purple
- Depeche Mode
- Ed Sheeran
- Elton John
- Enrique Iglesias
- Eric Clapton
- Eros Ramazzotti
- Faithless
- Glenn Miller Orchestra
- Gojira
- Golden Ring
- Gotan Project
- Gregorian
- Grigory Leps
- Gustavo
- Hurts
- Iggy and The Stooges
- Imagine Dragons
- Instrumenti
- Iron Maiden
- James Blunt
- James Brown
- Jean Michel Jarre
- Katie Melua
- Katy Perry
- KISS
- Korn
- Kylie Minogue
- Lana Del Rey
- Lenny Kravitz
- Limp Bizkit
- Linkin Park
- Lou Reed
- Louis Tomlinson
- Luis Fonsi
- Mariah Carey
- Marilyn Manson
- Mashina Vremeni
- Metallica
- Mika
- Mireille Mathieu
- Mumiy Troll
- Muse
- Nazareth
- Nine Inch Nails
- Okean Elzy
- Ozzy Osbourne
- Patricia Kaas
- Paul Mauriat
- Pet Shop Boys
- Pink
- Placebo
- Redfoo
- Prāta Vētra
- Queen + Paul Rodgers
- Queens of the Stone Age
- R.E.M.
- Rammstein
- Rihanna
- Ringo Starr & His All-Starr Band
- Robbie Williams
- Scorpions
- Scooter
- Seal
- Sex Pistols
- Sigur Rós
- Simply Red
- Smokie
- Suzi Quatro
- Sting
- The Cure
- Tiësto
- Tokio Hotel
- Toto Cutugno
- Thriller – Live
- The Orchestra
- Valery Meladze
- Vanessa-Mae
- We Are Scientists
- Zara Larsson
- Zemfira

== See also ==
- List of indoor arenas in Latvia
- List of European ice hockey arenas
- List of Kontinental Hockey League arenas

Preceded by North Shore Events Centre; Auckland	FIBA U-19 World Championship; Final Venue; 2011	Succeeded by Incumbent
Preceded by N/A (first venue)	Eurovision Choir; Venue; 2017	Succeeded by Partille Arena; Gothenburg
Preceded by Mercedes-Benz Arena; Berlin	FIBA EuroBasket; Final Venue; 2025	Succeeded by Movistar Arena; Madrid
