= 2030 IIHF World Championship =

2030 edition of the IIHF World Championship

Tournament details
- Host countries: Finland; Latvia
- Venues: 2 (in 2 host cities)
- Dates: 17 May – 2 June
- Teams: 16

The 2030 IIHF World Championship will be hosted in Helsinki, Finland and Riga, Latvia from 17 May to 2 June 2030. The last time Helsinki hosted the championships was in 2022, while Riga co-hosted in 2023.

== Host nation bid ==
The only bidders were Finland and Latvia.

After the 2026 IIHF World Championship, the IIHF Congress awarded Finland and Latvia the rights to host the competition.

== Participants ==
Qualified as hosts

- Finland
- Latvia

Automatic qualifier after a top 14 placement at the 2029 IIHF World Championship

- (N/A) TBD
- (N/A) TBD
- (N/A) TBD
- (N/A) TBD
- (N/A) TBD
- (N/A) TBD
- (N/A) TBD
- (N/A) TBD
- (N/A) TBD
- (N/A) TBD
- (N/A) TBD
- (N/A) TBD
- (N/A) TBD

Qualified through winning a promotion at the 2029 IIHF World Championship Division I

- (N/A) TBD

== Venues ==
Finland	2030 IIHF World Championship is located in Scandinavia	Latvia
Helsinki	2030 IIHF World Championship is located in Scandinavia	Riga
Veikkaus Arena; Capacity: 13,349	2030 IIHF World Championship is located in Scandinavia	Arena Riga; Capacity: 10,300
