= Capilla Flamenca =

Belgian early music consort

Capilla Flamenca is a vocal and instrumental early music consort based in Leuven, Belgium. The group specialises in 14th to 16th century music from Flanders and takes its name from the historical Flemish chapel (capilla flamenca), the choir of the court chapel of Emperor Charles V. When the emperor left Flanders in 1517, he took his best musicians with him to Spain to accompany him as "living polyphony".

The ensemble's Artistic Director, Dirk Snellings, died in 2014. The ensemble had ceased performing in November of the previous year.

== Members ==
The core of the Capilla Flamenca is four male singers, Marnix De Cat (Countertenor), Tore Tom Denys (Tenor, who succeeded Jan Caals in 2006), Lieven Termont (Baritone) and Dirk Snellings (1959–2014, Bass), who is also the group's artistic director, and a musicologist.

For each performance, the vocal core is enlarged either with complementary singers, an alta capella of wind instruments, a bassa capella of string instruments and/or an organ according to the needs of the genre. Among the singers, Psallentes (“the singers”) stand out, a Belgian vocal group specialising in plainsong and directed by Hendrik Vanden Abeele. The members of the wind bands Oltremontano, directed by sackbut-player Wim Becu, and La Caccia, directed by Patrick Denecker (recorder and bagpipes) frequently perform the function of alta capella. Capilla Flamenca has also performed and made recordings with Philadelphia-based Piffaro. The bassa capella consists of lute-player Jan van Outryve and viola da gamba-players Liam Fennelly, Thomas Baeté and Piet Stryckers. Joris Verdin is the group's organ player.

== Repertoire ==
=== Franco-Flemish polyphony ===
Capilla Flamenca specialises in Franco-Flemish polyphony, focusing on the music of around 1500. Recordings and performances of religious and profane works by Pierre de la Rue, Josquin des Prez, Heinrich Isaac, Johannes Prioris, Jacob Obrecht, to name just a few, have been executed since the ensemble's formation in the 1980s. Over the years, the group's interest has expanded to include earlier music, most notably the so-called Ars Nova and Ars Subtilior of the 14th century.

The group's recordings and performances are characterised by musicological research and by attention to authentic performance. Capilla Flamenca's analysis is based on a study of the original sources, in co-operation with fellow musicologists. This includes solving the typical conundrums of early music, such as the use of musica ficta, the problem of text-setting, the correct use of mensural proportions, the decoding of canons and the authentic pronunciation of French, Flemish and Latin .

=== Cross-over ===
Capilla Flamenca has made cross-over productions with artists from other artistic disciplines. Side by side with the dancers of Les Ballets C de la B, the Capilla toured the world with Foi, directed by Sidi Larbi Cherkaoui and choreographed by Joanna Dudley. Between 2003 and 2005 the production was performed more than 100 times.

In 2005, the ensemble confronted Jacob Obrecht's music with the video artist Walter Verdin's view on the famous The Garden of Earthly Delights by Hieronymus Bosch. More recently, in collaboration with the contemporary music ensemble Het Collectief, the Capilla Flamenca created 12X12, a programme combining Karl-Heinz Stockhausen's Tierkreis with Ars Nova polyphony. In 2007, Joanna Dudley joined them again in the theatre and video production Who killed Cock Robin?.

== Festivals and concert halls ==
Capilla Flamenca has been a guest at festivals such as the Festival of Arezzo, the Holland Festival of Oude Muziek at Utrecht , Ferrara Musica , Festival de Saintes , Festival d’Ambronay and Cuenca Religious music Week. In 2005, it was ensemble in residence at the Laus Polyphoniae Festival in Antwerp.

The ensemble has appeared on the stages of concert halls, such as the Centre for Fine Arts in Brussels , Concertgebouw Brugge , the Konzerthaus in Vienna and Concertgebouw in Amsterdam.

== Educational activities ==
In addition to recording and performing, the Capilla Flamenca has a commitment to education. In order to further the understanding of polyphonic music, Capilla Flamenca's concerts are preceded by an introduction to the programme aimed at the general public. Capilla Flamenca and its members teach at music conservatories. They often teach master classes and workshops, both for experienced amateurs and for young professionals. From 2005 to 2007, Marnix De Cat worked with a group of boys and girls (pueri) in order to introduce them to polyphony. Like the 15th- and 16th-century choristers, the young singers were instructed by the magister puerorum (master of the choristers) in the rules of music and the art of singing through simple songs and plainsong. This resulted in a number of concerts and a CD.

== Awards ==
In 2003, Capilla Flamenca received the Premio Il Filarmonico at the festival of Arezzo. In 2005, it was awarded the Flanders Cultural Award (“Cultuurprijs Vlaanderen”) for music.

== Discography ==
- 1993 - Puer nobis. Christmas in the Renaissance. Eufoda 1147.
- 1993 - Renaissance. Polyfonie in Brugge. The Songbook of Zeghere van Male. Eufoda 1155.
- 1995 - Zingen en spelen in Vlaamse steden en begijnhoven. Music in Flemish, Cities and Beguignages 1400-1500. Eufoda 1266.
- 1996 - Pierre de la Rue. Missa Alleluia. Music at the Burgundy Court. Eufoda 1232.
- 1996 - Oh Flanders Free. Music of the Flemish Renaissance: Ockeghem, Josquin, Susato, De la Rue. Capilla Flamenca. Alamire LUB 03, Naxos 8.554516.
- 1996 - Sei Willekomen. Capilla Flamenca and Flanders Recorder Quartet. Eufoda 1256.
- 1996 - Concentu melodiae. K.U.Leuven 96-01.
- 1998 - Bassano: Viva L'Amore. Capilla Flamenca and Flanders Recorder Quartet. Opus 111 30-239.
- 1998 - Margarete - Maximilian I. Musik um 1500. Capilla Flamenca with La Caccia, Schola Cantorum Cantate Domino Aalst, Schola Gregoriana Lovaniensis. ORF Shop CD 265 (2 CDs).
- 1999 - The A-La-Mi-Re Manuscripts. Flemish Polyphonic Treasures for Charles V: Josquin, De la Rue, Willaert. Naxos 8.554744.
- 1999 - I Fiamminghi - V. Brassart: In festo Corporis Christi. Ricercar 233362..
- 2000 - Jean de Castro: Polyphony in a European Perspective. Capilla Flamenca with More Maiorum, Piffaro, Trigon-Project, Wim Diepenhorst and Bart Demuyt. Passacaille 931.
- 2001 - Resonanzen 2001. Viva España. Capilla Flamenca and others. ORF "Edition Alte Musik" CD 281.
- 2001 - The Flemish Organ Heritage. Capilla Flamenca and A. van den Kerckhoven. Naxos 8.555809.
- 2001 - Arnold de Lantins: Missa Verbum Incarnatum. Capilla Flamenca with Psallentes, Oltremontano and Clari Cantuli. Ricercar 207.
- 2002 - Pierre de la Rue: Missa de septem doloribus. Capilla Flamenca and Psallentes. Musique en Wallonie 0207. .
- 2002 - Musica Reservata. Endangered Sounds. Capilla Flamenca and Psallentes. Alamire Foundation 2002.
- 2002 - Vivanco: Libro de Motetes (1610). Capilla Flamenca and Oltremontano. LCD 9706.
- 2002 - Prioris: Requiem. Eufoda 1349 .
- 2003 - Foi. Ars nova, oral traditional music and more. CAPI 2003 .
- 2003 - Alexander Utendal and Philippe de Monte: Motets. Capilla Flamenca and Oltremontano. Passacaille 937.
- 2003 - Canticum Canticorum. In Praise of Love: The Song of Songs in the Renaissance. Eufoda 1359.
- 2004 - Zodiac. Ars Nova and Ars Subtilior in the Low Countries and Europe. Eufoda 1360.
- 2004 - Obrecht: Chansons, Songs, Motets. Capilla Flamenca and Piffaro. Eufoda 1361.
- 2005 - Priest and Bon Vivant. Sounds of the City of Louvain from the 16th Century. Works by Clemens non Papa and his contemporaries. Capilla Flamenca, La Caccia and Jan van Outryve. Etc. 1287.
- 2005 - Dulcis Melancholia. Biographie musicale de Marguerite d'Autriche. MEW 525.
- 2005 - Pierre de la Rue: Missa Ave Maria, Vespers. Capilla Flamenca and Psallentes. MEW 0633.
- 2006 - Flemish and Walloon Organ Treasure, Volume 4. Capilla Flamenca and Joris Verdin. Vision-Air 2006/1.
- 2006 - Lumina. Christmas Around The 1500s. Capilla Flamenca and Pueri. Eufoda 1366 .
- 2007 - Désir D'aymer. Love Lyrics Around 1500: From Flanders To Italy. Capilla Flamenca. Eufoda 1369.
- 2007 - Lambert de Sayve: Sacred Music. Capilla Flamenca and Oltremontano. KTC 4022.
- 2007 - Salve Mater Salve Jesu. Chant and Polyphony From Bohemia Around 1500. Capilla Flamenca and Schola Gregoriana Pragensis, with Barbara Maria Willi. KTC 1346.
- 2008 - Bellum et Pax. Missa L'homme armé / Da pacem. Capilla Flamenca and Oltremontano. Eufoda 1372 .
- 2008 - Rosa (Mia). Capilla Flamenca (polyphonic adaptation of 'Mia' by the rock band Gorki). Lipstick Notes.
- 2009 - En un gardin. Les quatre saisons de l'Ars Nova. Manuscrits de Stavelot , Mons, Utrecht , Leiden . Capilla Flamenca. MEW 0852
- 2009 - Roland de Lassus. Bonjour mon coeur. Capilla Flamenca. RIC 290 / Eufoda 1376
- 2010 - Alexander Agricola. Missa In myne zin. Capilla Flamenca. RIC 306
- 2011 - Heinrich Isaac. Ich muss dich lassen. Capilla Flamenca, Oltremontano, Dirk Snellings. RIC 318
- 2011 - Espris d'amours. Miniatures flamandes. Capilla Flamenca, Marnix De Cat. MEW 1157
- 2012 - Adrian Willaert Vespro della beata vergine. Capilla Flamenca, Dirk Snelling Ricercar
- 2012 - Karlheinz Stockhausen Tierkreis - 12x12 "A Musical Zodiac" Capilla Flamenca, Het Collectief KTC

Reissues

- 2011 - Pierre de la Rue. Portrait musical. 3CD Capilla Flamenca, Dirk Snellings. MEW 1159 (CD1: Missa de septem doloribus 2001, CD2: Missa Ave Maria, Vespera 2005, CD3: Missa sub tuum praesidium (not previously released) 2011, 4 chansons from MEW0525 2005, Missa Alleluia from Eufoda1232, 1996).
