= Eurovision Choir =

Biennial music competition focused on choirs

- Also known as: Eurovision Choir of the Year
- Genre: Choral competition
- Based on: World Choir Games
- Countries of origin: List of countries
- Original language: English
- No. of episodes: 2 contests

Production
- Production location: Various host cities
- Running time: 120 minutes
- Production companies: European Broadcasting Union; Interkultur Foundation

Original release
- Release: 22 July 2017 – 3 August 2019

Related
- Let the Peoples Sing

Eurovision Choir (formerly Eurovision Choir of the Year) was a choral competition organised by the European Broadcasting Union (EBU) and Interkultur Foundation. It is modeled after the latter's World Choir Games. Participation is open to non-professional choirs selected by member broadcasters of the EBU.

The inaugural competition took place in 2017 in Riga, Latvia, and was won by Slovenia. The second edition took place in Gothenburg, Sweden in 2019 and was won by Denmark. Planning for a third edition was cancelled in June 2021 by the Interkultur; a host broadcaster for the event had not been selected before the announcement, nor had any countries announced their participation.

In October 2022, it was announced by the EBU that Eurovision Choir would return in 2023, hosted by Latvijas Televīzija for the second time in the contest's history. However on 17 May 2023, the EBU announced that the 2023 edition had been cancelled. No host city or venue had been revealed before the cancellation. The official list of participants was also not released before the cancellation, however, five countries had confirmed their intention to participate.

In October 2024, following the cancellation of the 2021 and 2023 contests, the EBU confirmed that it was not considering organising a new edition in 2025 making it unlikely that the contest will return in the near future. This was reaffirmed in January 2026.

== Origins ==
Former generic logo (used in 2017).

Following the positive reception of "Born in Riga", a concert organized by the Latvian broadcaster Latvijas Televīzija (LTV), the concept of Eurovision Choir was first discussed in 2014 as a contest organized by LTV and the network Arte. LTV approached multiple broadcasters, including the European Broadcasting Union (EBU) and Interkultur, regarding the organisation of the new contest. The event was officially confirmed on 30 November 2016 depending on a reasonable amount of interest from active members of the EBU. On 21 July 2017, it was announced that the Eurovision Choir of the Year would be a biennial contest unless viewing figures were higher than expected.

The inaugural contest was hosted by LTV and took place on 22 July 2017, coinciding with the closing ceremony of the European Choir Games 2017.

== Format ==
Participating EBU-member broadcasters select a non-professional choir or a cappella ensemble to represent their home country to compete for the Eurovision Choir of the Year title, with prizes including a recording contract for the winning choir. Each choir performs an unaccompanied set of approximately six minutes in any genre and is adjudicated by a panel of choral music professionals who decide the winner. In 2019, three finalists were chosen to present a second set by which the final ranking was decided.

== Participation ==
Countries that participated in the contest: Entered at least once Never entered, although was eligible to do so Entry intended or initially expressed

Broadcasters from a total of thirteen countries have participated in Eurovision Choir on at least one occasion. The 2017 of the contest in 2017 featured choirs from nine countries, while the 2019 in 2019 featured ten participating countries. Non-participating broadcasters had also broadcast the event in their countries, with the 2017 event being broadcast in Albania (RTSH), Australia (SBS), France (Arte), Norway (NRK), Serbia (RTS) and Ukraine (UR). The below table outlines the participating broadcasters and details on their participation in the contest.

Table key
1	Winner	The country won the contest
2	Second place	The country was ranked second
3	Third place	The country was ranked third
X	Remaining places	The country entered in the contest
	No entry	The country did not enter the contest

Country	Broadcaster	Debut year	2017	2019
Austria	ORF	2017	X	
Belgium	RTBF	2017	X	X
Denmark	DR	2017	X	1
Estonia	ERR	2017	X	
Germany	WDR	2017	X	X
Hungary	MTVA	2017	X	
Latvia	LTV	2017	3	2
Norway	NRK	2019		X
Scotland	BBC Alba	2019		X
Slovenia	RTVSLO	2017	1	3
Sweden	SVT	2019		X
Switzerland	RTS	2019		X
Wales	S4C	2017	2	X

== Hosting ==
Unlike other Eurovision contests, where the host location is chosen by the previous year's winning broadcaster, Eurovision Choir has been held as a component of Interkultur's Grand Prix of Nations & European Choir Games, with the contest being held in the country hosting said events. Most of the expense of the contest is covered by commercial sponsors and contributions from the other participating broadcasters. The table below shows a list of cities and venues that have hosted Eurovision Choir, one or more times. Future venues are shown in italics.

Contests	Country	City	Venue	Years
1	Latvia	Riga	Arena Riga	2017
1	Sweden	Gothenburg	Partille Arena	2019

== Winning entries ==
Year	Date	Host city	No.	Winner	Song(s)	Choir
2017	22 July	(Latvia) Riga	9	Slovenia	"Ta na Solbici" "Adrca" "Aj, zelena je vsa gora"	Carmen Manet
2019	3 August	(Sweden) Gothenburg	10	Denmark	"Viola"	Vocal Line
