= Partille Arena =

Indoor arena in Sweden

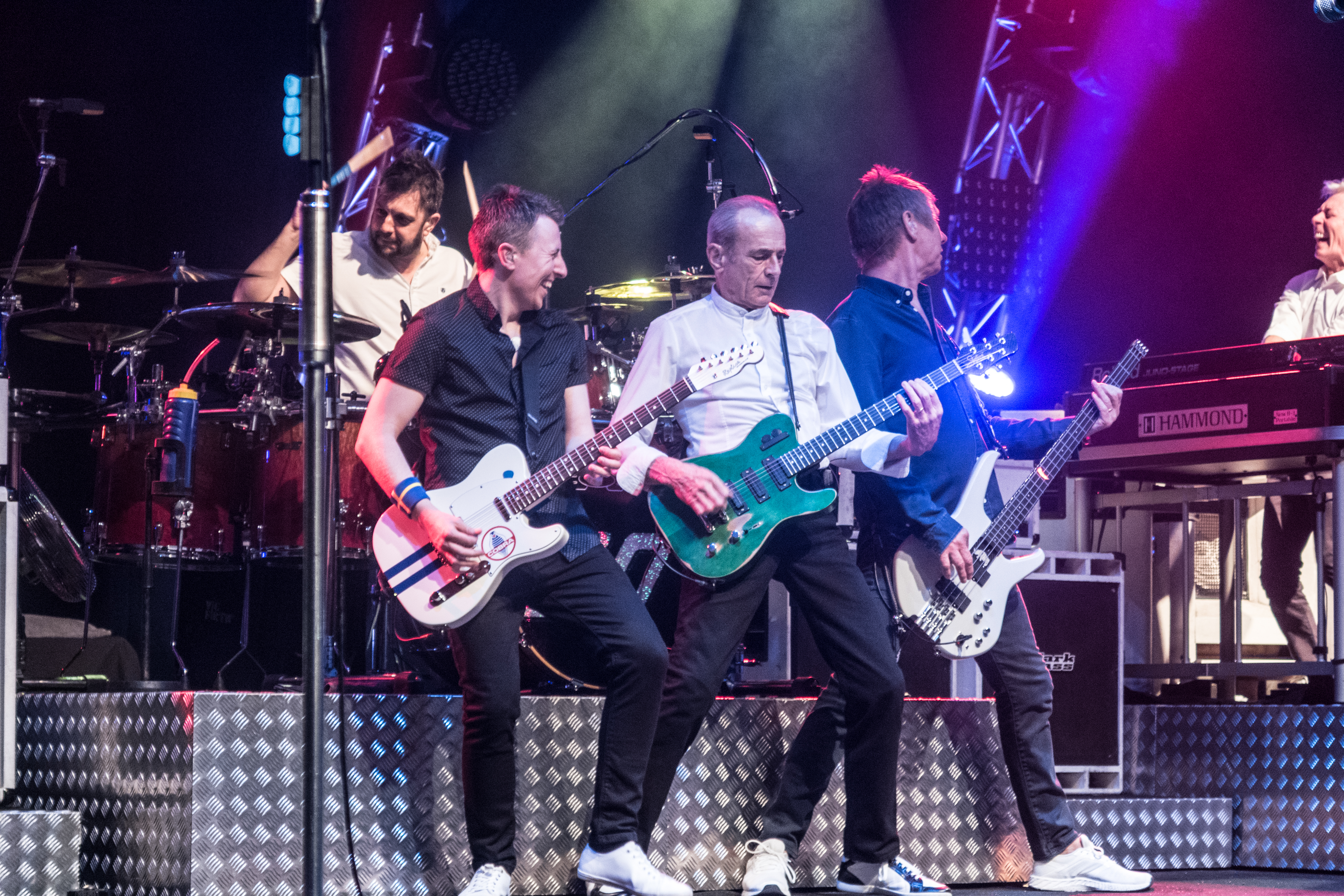
- The current lineup of Status Quo live at Partille Arena, Partille, Sweden, 2017-04-22. Left to right: Leon Cave, Richie Malone, Francis Rossi, John 'Rhino Edwards', Andy Bown
- Interactive map of Partille Arena
- Location: Partille, Sweden
- Coordinates: 57°44′24″N 12°7′1″E
- Operator: Municipality of Partille
- Capacity: 4,000 (sports); 5,500 (concerts)

Construction
- Groundbreaking: 2013
- Opened: 2016
- Architect: Tengbomgruppen AB

Tenants
- IK Sävehof; John Scotts; Improve Gym

Partille Arena is a multi-purpose indoor arena that was inaugurated in September 2016. The arena holds 5,500 people during concerts and 4,000 during sporting events. The arena also holds a gym, bowling alley, restaurant and conference rooms.

== Events and tenants ==
Since the arena's inauguration, it has hosted a number of events, such as P3 Guld, Sweden's biggest music awards.

In 2018, a new audience record was set when Bryan Adams played in front of 5,503 people.

According to Partille Arenas official Facebook page, the record was broken once more on September 9, 2023, when Power Metal bands Helloween and HammerFall played for an audience of 5604.

The event management is operated by the municipality of Partille and the arena holds a number of tenants, one of which is IK Sävehof, a handball club from Partille. IK Sävehof is one of the biggest handball clubs in the world and has both a women's and men's team in the highest respective leagues in Sweden. o

== See also ==
- List of indoor arenas in Sweden

Preceded by Arena Riga; Riga	Eurovision Choir; Venue; 2019	Succeeded by Incumbent
