= Les Pastoureaux =

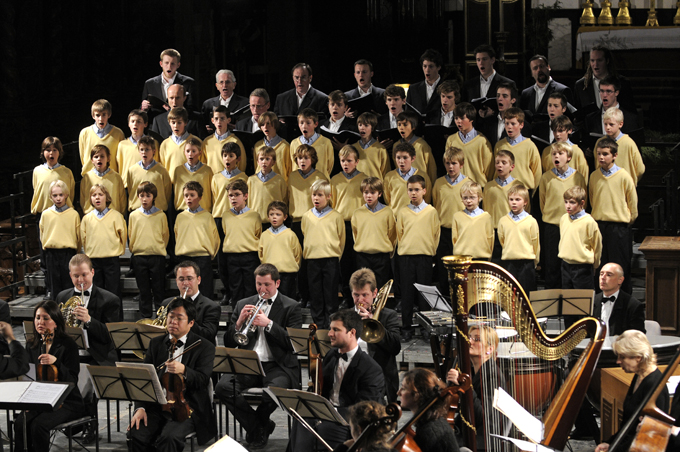
Les Pastoureaux

Les Pastoureaux (literally: "The Shepherd Boys"), also known as the Petits Chanteurs de Waterloo, is a Belgian choir of boys and men based in Waterloo, Belgium. It was established in 1974 and is currently conducted by Xavier Devillers. Their repertoire includes works of sacred music as well as songs of the world.

== History ==
=== Concerts and events ===
Since Christmas 1974, Les Pastoureaux traditionally perform a series of concerts during the Christmas and holiday season, in Brussels (at the Centre for Fine Arts and in the Cathedral of St. Michael and St. Gudula), as well as in Wallonia. They also sing at various music festivals, such as the Festival of Wallonia and the Festival of Flanders. Their numerous concerts include collaborations with artists such as the famous bass-baritone José van Dam, the Belgian soprano Marie-Noëlle de Callataÿ and the American soprano Jeanette Thompson. Les Pastoureaux are regularly guests of private events, including most notably performances at the Royal Palace of Brussels and the Royal Castle of Laeken as well as their collaboration to the official show for the changeover to the euro (The Euro Bridge, Brussels, 31 December 2001). Besides, they are often called on for weddings ceremonies. On several occasions, soloists of Les Pastoureaux have taken part in opera productions, at the National Opera of Belgium La Monnaie and abroad.

They represented Belgium at the Eurovision Choir of the Year 2017 in Riga, Latvia.

=== Directors ===
- 1974–2006: Bernard Pagnier
- 2006–2024: Philippe Favette
- 2024: Philippe Favette and Xavier Devillers
- 2025–: Xavier Devillers

== Summer tours ==
Since 1980, Les Pastoureaux travel on a two-three week international concert tour during summer. They've been to Argentina, Austria, Brazil, Canada, Colombia, Czech Republic, France, Germany, Hungary, Italy, Japan, Luxembourg, Poland, Portugal, Slovenia, Spain, Sweden, Switzerland and United States.

== Discography ==
- Les Pastoureaux. Petits Chanteurs de Waterloo (LP, 1979)
- Mozart, Buxtehude, Haendel, Haydn (LP, 1981)
- Les Pastoureaux. Petits Chanteurs de Waterloo (LP, 1983)
- Noël c'est l'Amour (LP, 1984)
- Schubert, Mozart, Buxtehude (LP, 1987)
- Haydn: Nelson Mass, Schubert: Mass in G Major D 167 (Soleil Levant)
- Mozart: Requiem (Soleil Levant 1991)
- Chants de Noël (Soleil Levant 1992)
- Christmas in Waterloo (Syrinx Record 1994)
- Mozart: Coronation Mass KV 317, Solemn Vespers of the Confessor KV 339 (Soleil Levant 1997)
- Les Pastoureaux en tournée (Soleil Levant 1999)
- Les Pastoureaux. Petits Chanteurs de Waterloo (for the choir's 30th birthday, Soleil Levant 2005)
- Llibre Vermell de Montserrat (with the early-music instrumental ensemble Millenarium, Psallentes and the Chœur de chambre de Namur, Ricercar 2007)
- For the Beauty of the Earth (2012)
- Around the World (2014)
- Fauré: Requiem (2017)
- Noël! (2019)
- Vivaldi: Gloria RV 589, Dixit Dominus RV 595 (with the Millenium Orchestra, 2022)

== See also ==
- Boys' choir
