= Handgame =

Native American guessing game

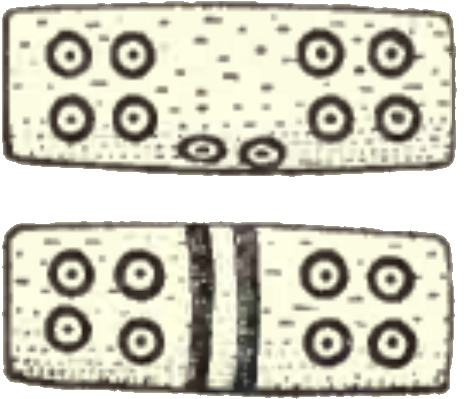
Handgame bones

Handgame, also known as stickgame, is a Native American guessing game, in which marked "bones" are concealed in the hands of one team while another team guesses their location.

== Gameplay ==
Any number of people can play the Hand Game, but each team (the "hiding" team and the "guessing" team) must have one pointer on each side. The Hand Game is played with two pairs of 'bones', each pair consisting of one plain and one striped bone. ten sticks are used as counters with some variations using additional count sticks such as extra stick or "kick Stick" won by the starting team. The "raw" or "uncooked" counting sticks will be divided evenly between both opposing teams.

Different rules such as which bone will be guessed, the plain or striped bone, is determined by the traditional format of the tribe or region - the plain bone or the striped bone. California, Oklahoma, and Dakota Indians generally call for the striped bone, where as most other tribes prefer to guess for the plain bone.

The two teams, one "hiding" and one "guessing," sit opposite one another; two members of the "hiding" team take a pair of bones and hide them, one in each hand, while the team sings, and uses traditional instruments (drums, sticks, shakers), and attempts to distract the "guessing" team. The leader or 'Captain' of the "guessing" team, or a team member selected by the Captain, then must guess the pattern of the hidden bones. Since each hider holds one plain and one striped bone in each hand, there are initially four possibilities: both to the left, both to the right, both inside, or both outside. A gesture with a stick or hand generally accompanies each call the signs for these are to the left, which is to both hiders left. to the right, which is to both hiders right. In the middle with is in between the assigned hiders. Or outside with is on the outside of the hiders. For each hider mis-guessed, the calling team must turn over one stick to the hiders. If a hider is guessed he must surrender the guessed bones to the calling side. The side continues hiding and singing until both pairs of bones have been guessed and surrendered. Then the teams reverse roles, and the game continues in this manner until one team holds all the sticks.

How the betting is factored in is tribes will play against one another for material items such as beaded material, fabric, and flour, but most of the time money is wagered on the handgames. Such games would be used to settle disputes, or to wager for items like bullets, clothing, and hides.

== History ==
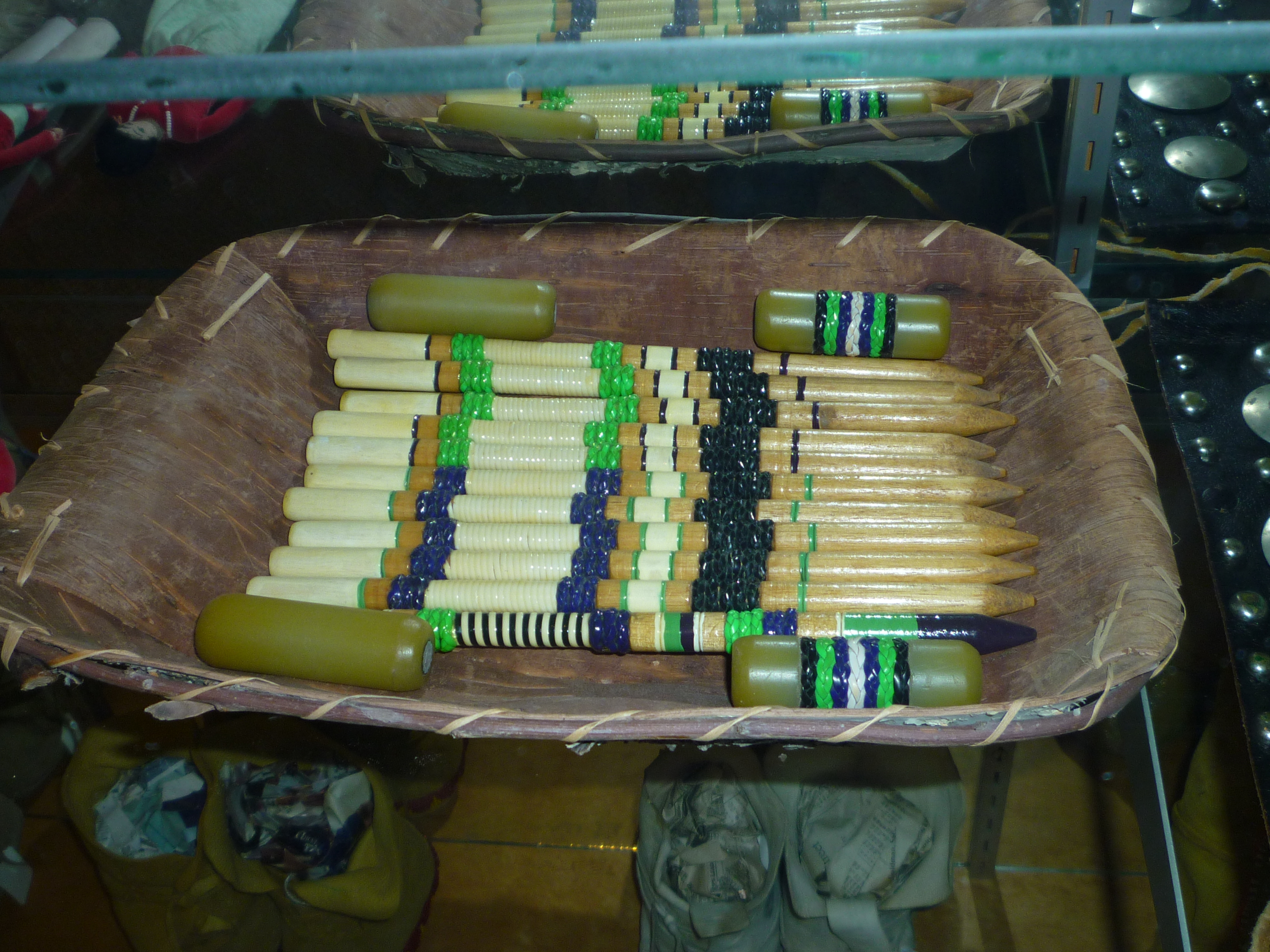
Stick game set

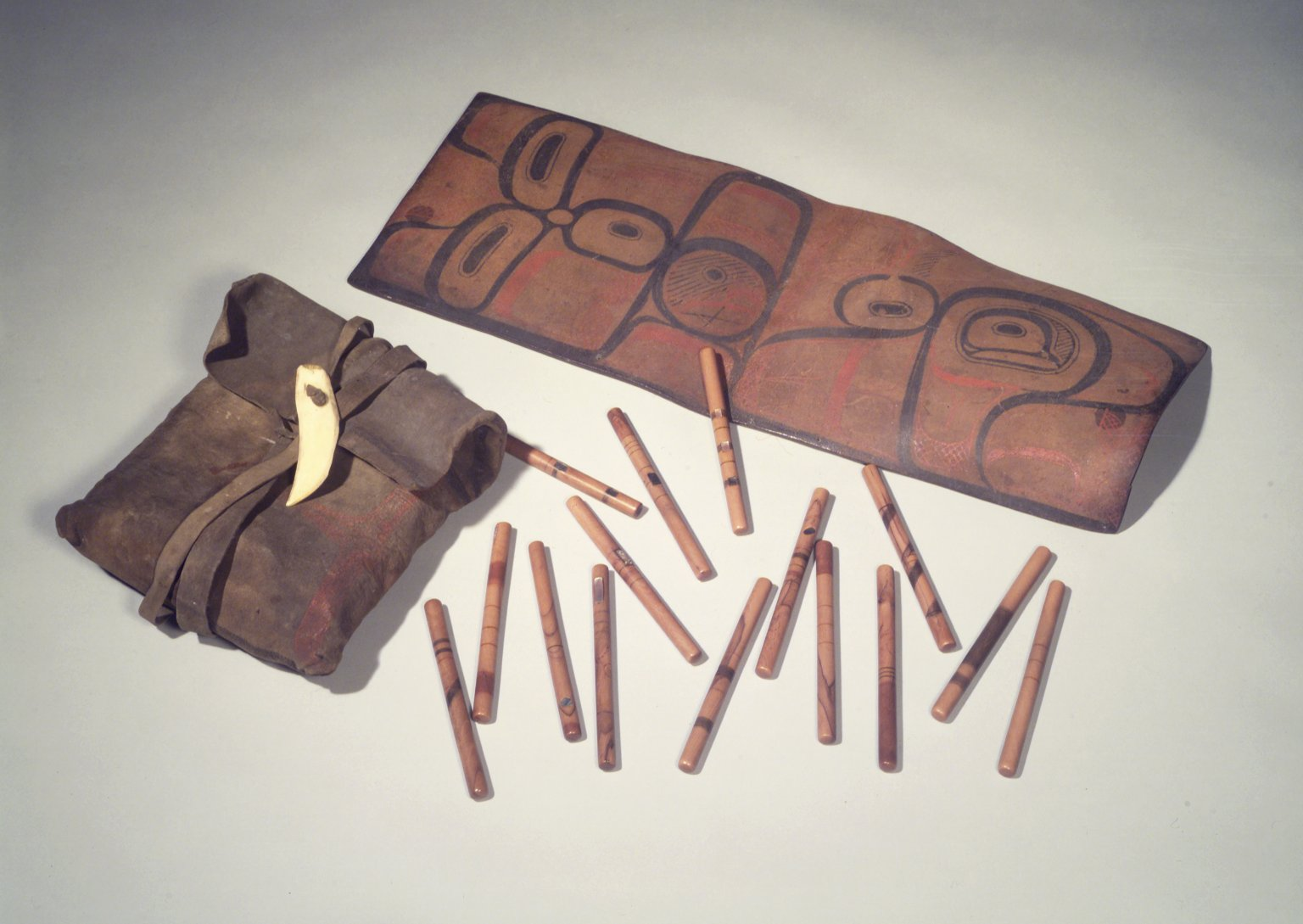
Bag with 65 Inlaid Gambling Sticks, Tsimshian, 19th century

Handgame predates recorded history. The oral tradition tells us that people originally learned Handgame from the animals. Historical documentation states that games were once played for land use and female companionship, and later on for horses and cattle. Today, handgame is played during traditional gatherings, powwows, tribal celebrations, and more recently in tournaments hosted by individual tribes or Indian organizations. More recent versions of handgame played by tribes in the Northwest added an extra stick, or "kickstick"; this variation was promulgated by the Paiute medicine man Wovoka when he traveled to the Northwest to teach the Ghost Dance. Handgame bones and counting sticks have been identified in ancient anthropological digs.

Handgame continues to spread amongst Native American tribes; the Indian Gaming Regulatory Act classified it as Class I gaming, leaving its regulation to individual tribes.

In 2010, Tulalip's Battle of Nations Stick Game Tournament, the largest handgame tournament to date in the US, attracted 177 teams competing for a $US 30,000 first prize.

Singer Judy Trejo has recorded a CD, Stick Game Songs of the Paiute, on Canyon Records.

== See also ==
- Slahal, stickgame as played Indigenous peoples of the Pacific Northwest Coast
- Up Jenkins, a British game played with a coin
