= Morgan Jones (broadcaster) =

Welsh television presenter

- Citizenship: Welsh
- Occupation: TV Presenter
- Years active: 2001-present
- Known for: presenter of the S4C European football show, Sgorio.

Morgan Jones is a Welsh television presenter who started his career in 2001. He is best known for his role as the presenter of the S4C European football show, Sgorio.

== Career ==
Morgan Jones started his career in 2001 as presenter for S4C European football show, Sgorio.

His general interest in sport has seen him present the Snowdon Race and the Snowdonia Marathon for many years. He has also presented live broadcasts for many years covering Wales's major cultural events including the National Eisteddfod, the Urdd Eisteddfod, the Llangollen International Eisteddfod and the Royal Welsh show. And the 'Digwyddiadau' series took him to various events around the country for many years.

He has a musical background, and this gave him the opportunity to present the 'Côr Cymru' and 'Band Cymru' competitions with Rondomedia. He also presents the Cardiff Singers Competition and has frequently presented the Bryn Terfel Scholarship. Morgan also presented the TV quiz programmes "0 ond 1" and Tipit with Alex Jones.

In 2019, he was the commentator for Eurovision Choir 2019 in Sweden.
