= Tipit =

British game show

Tipit is a game show broadcast on S4C, hosted by Alex Jones and Morgan Jones. Tipit (also spelled "tippit") is a traditional Welsh pub game, in which two teams of three face each other across the table and guess in which of the six hands opposite them an item, known as the tipit, is hidden.

The team with the tipit can gain a point if they successfully hide the tipit from the other team. The team guessing where it is gains a point if they successfully find the tipit. There are three members of each team and each team has a captain, named the King or Queen. The guessing team can call "away" and point at a hand they think does not contain the tipit, or say "tipit" and point at a hand they think is hiding it.

The successful team retains or gains control of the tipit. The television version is played until one team has seven points.

In the TV version, the guessing team have three tactical choices, each can only be used once in the game:

- Ddewis Dau Ddwrn ("Takeaway Two") – The team hiding the tipit must reveal two hands that do not contain the tipit.
- Ddewis Dyblu ("Double or Nothing") – The guessing team wins two points if they successfully locate the tipit.
- Siawns i Siglo ("Shakey Shakey") – The team hiding the tipit must shake the hands, still remaining in play, in the air.
