= Jacob Obrecht =

Flemish composer

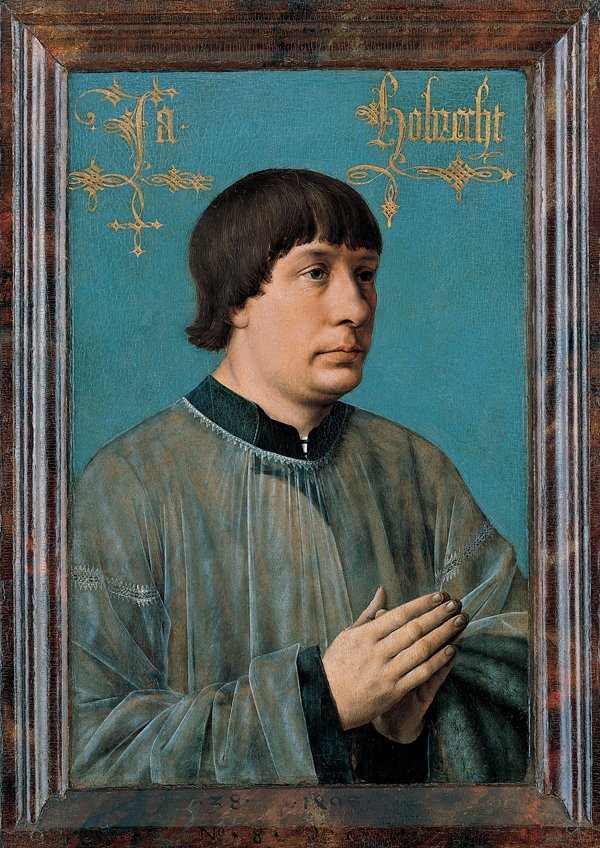
Jacob Obrecht. Ascribed to Hans Memling or Quentin Matsys, dated 1496 on the frame.

Jacob Obrecht (also Hobrecht; 1457/8 – late July 1505) was a Flemish composer of masses, motets and songs. He was the most famous composer of masses in Europe of the late 15th century and was only eclipsed after his death by Josquin des Prez.

== Life ==
What little is known of Obrecht's origins and early childhood comes mostly from his motet Mille quingentis. He was the only son of Ghent city trumpeter Willem Obrecht and Lijsbette Gheeraerts. His mother died in 1460 at the age of 20, and his father in 1488 in Ghent.

Details of his early education are sparse, but he probably learned to play the trumpet, like his father, and in so doing learned counterpoint and how to improvise over a cantus firmus. He is likely to have known Antoine Busnois at the Burgundian court, and certainly knew his music, since Obrecht's earliest mass shows close stylistic parallels with the elder composer.

Scholar, composer and clergyman, Obrecht seems to have had a succession of short appointments, two of which ended in less than ideal circumstances. There is a record of his compensating for a shortfall in his accounts by donating choirbooks he had copied. Throughout the period he was held in the highest esteem both by his patrons and by his fellow composers. Tinctoris, writing in Naples, singles him out in a shortlist of contemporary master composers—all the more significant because he was only 25 when Tinctoris created his list, and on the other side of Europe. Erasmus served as one of Obrecht's choirboys around 1476.

While most of Obrecht's appointments were in Flanders in the Low Countries, he made at least two trips to Italy, once in 1487 at the invitation of Duke Ercole d'Este I of Ferrara, and again in 1504. Ercole had heard Obrecht's music, which is known to have circulated in Italy between 1484 and 1487, and said that he appreciated it above the music of all other contemporary composers; consequently he invited Obrecht to Ferrara for six months in 1487. In 1504 Obrecht returned to Ferrara, but on the death of the Duke at the beginning of the next year he became unemployed. In what capacity he stayed in Ferrara is unknown, but he died in the outbreak of plague there just before 1 August 1505.

== Works ==
Obrecht wrote mainly sacred music—masses and motets—and he also wrote some chansons.

Combining modern and archaic elements, Obrecht's style is multi-dimensional. Perhaps more than those of the mature Josquin, the masses of Obrecht display a profound debt to the music of Johannes Ockeghem in the wide-arching melodies and long musical phrases that typify the latter's music. Obrecht's style is an example of the contrapuntal extravagance of the late 15th century. He often used a cantus firmus technique for his masses: sometimes he divided his source material up into short phrases; at other times he used retrograde versions of complete melodies or melodic fragments. He once even extracted the component notes and ordered them by note value, long to short, constructing new melodic material from the reordered sequences of notes. Clearly to Obrecht there could not be too much variety, particularly during the musically exploratory period of his early twenties. He began to break free from conformity to formes fixes, especially in his chansons. Of the formes fixes, the rondeau retained its popularity longest. However, he much preferred composing Masses, where he found greater freedom. Furthermore, his motets reveal a wide variety of moods and techniques.

In his Missa Sub tuum presidium, the number of voice parts in the five movements increases from three in the Kyrie, to four in the Gloria, and so on up to seven in the Agnus Dei. The title chant is clearly heard in the top voice throughout the work, and five additional Marian chants are found in movements other than the Kyrie and Gloria: Ave preclara maris stella (Sequence verse 7, Soprano II, Credo), Aurea virga prime matris Eve (Sequence verse 9b, Soprano II and Tenor II, Sanctus), Aurea virga prime matrix Eve (Sequence verse 3b, Soprano II and Tenor I, Agnus Dei I & II), Regina caeli (Antiphon, Soprano II and Tenor I, Agnus Dei III), and Verbum bonum et suave (Sequence verse 3b, Alto I, Agnus Dei). His late four-voice mass, Missa Maria zart (tender Maria), tentatively dated to around 1504, is based on a devotional song popular in the Tyrol, which he probably heard as he went through the region around 1503 to 1504. Requiring more than an hour to perform, it is one of the longest polyphonic settings of the Mass Ordinary ever written and is considered among his finest works.

Despite working at the same period, Obrecht and Ockeghem (Obrecht's senior by some 30 years) differ significantly in musical style. Obrecht does not share Ockeghem's fanciful treatment of the cantus firmus but chooses to quote it verbatim. Whereas the phrases in Ockeghem's music are ambiguously defined, those of Obrecht's music can easily be distinguished, though both composers favor wide-arching melodic structure. Furthermore, Obrecht splices the cantus firmus melody with the intent of audibly reorganizing the motives; Ockeghem, on the other hand, does this far less.

Obrecht's procedures contrast sharply with the works of the next generation, who favored an increasing simplicity of approach (prefigured by some works of his contemporary Josquin). Although he was renowned in his time, Obrecht appears to have had little influence on subsequent composers; most probably, he simply went out of fashion along with the other contrapuntal masters of his generation.

== Recordings ==
- Flemish Masters, Virginia Arts Recordings, VA-04413, performed by Zephyrus, 2004. Includes the Obrecht Missa Sub tuum presidium, as well as motets by Willaert, Clemens non-Papa, Ockeghem, Des Prez, Mouton, and Gombert.
- Obrecht, Missa Maria zart, performed by the Tallis Scholars, directed by Peter Phillips, Gimell Records CDGIM 032, 1996.
- Jacob Obrecht. Chansons, Songs, Motets, Capilla Flamenca and Piffaro, Eufoda 1361, 2005
- "Missa Sub Tuum Praesidium", The Clerks' Group, Gaudeamus, 2003.
- "Missa Malheur Me Bat", The Clerks' Group, Gaudeamus, 1998.
- "Missa de Sancto Donatiano", Cappella Pratensis, Fineline, 2009.
- "Jacob Obrecht", The Sound and the Fury, ORF, 2009.
- "Obrecht Masses", Beauty Farm, 2019, includes Missa Fortuna Desperata and Missa Maria Zart.
