= Estonian TV Girls' Choir =

Estonian choir

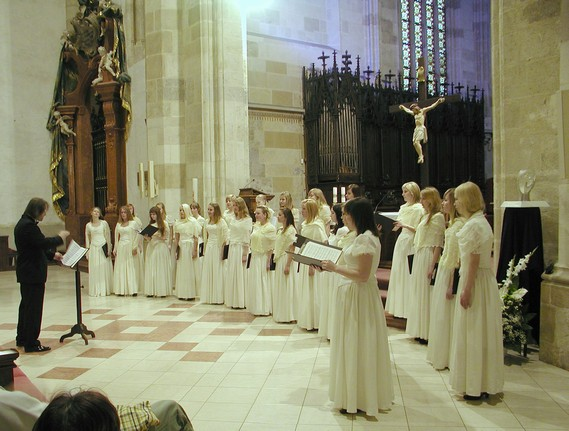
Estonian TV Girls' Choir (2008)

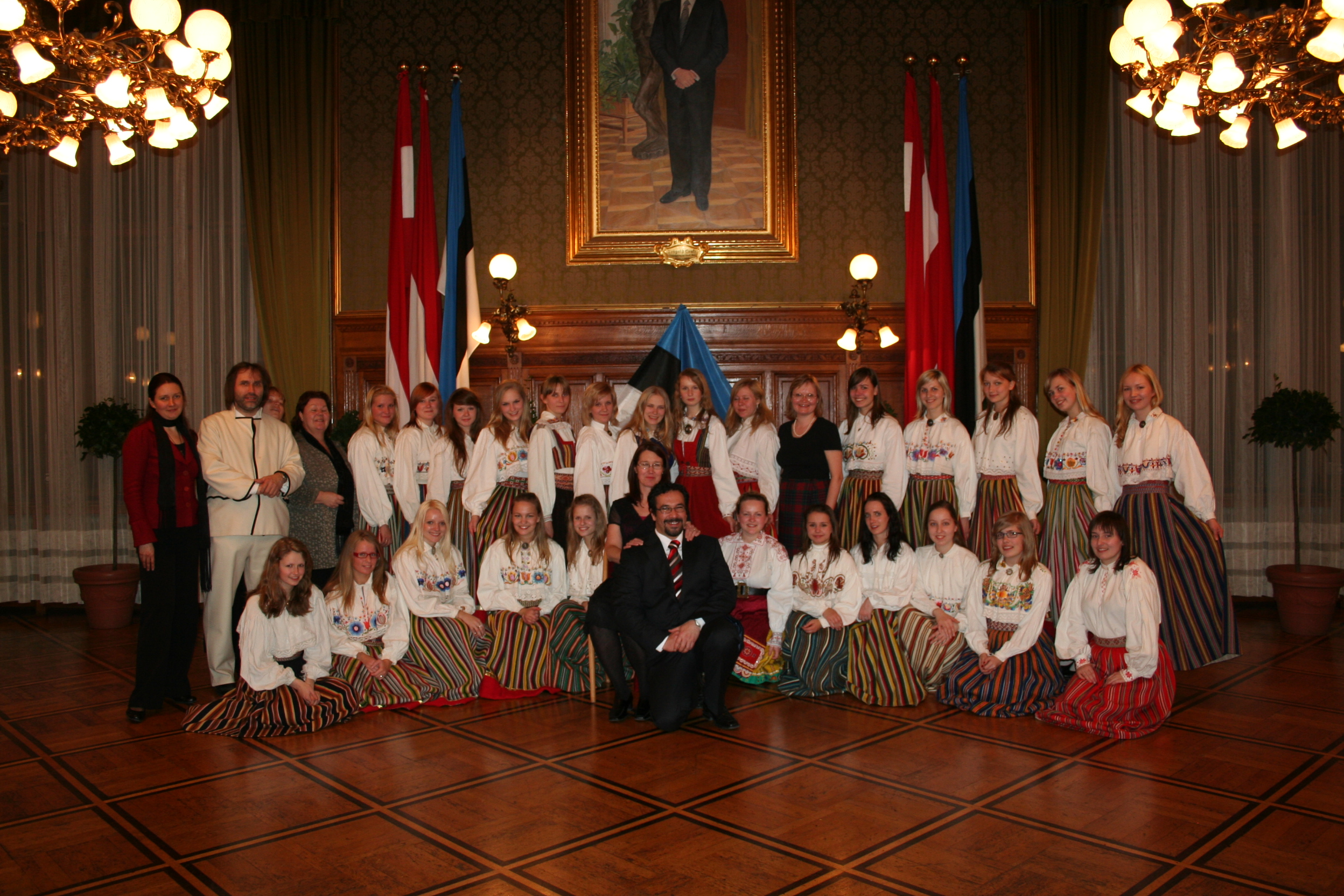
Estonian TV Girls' Choir in Vienna, 2008

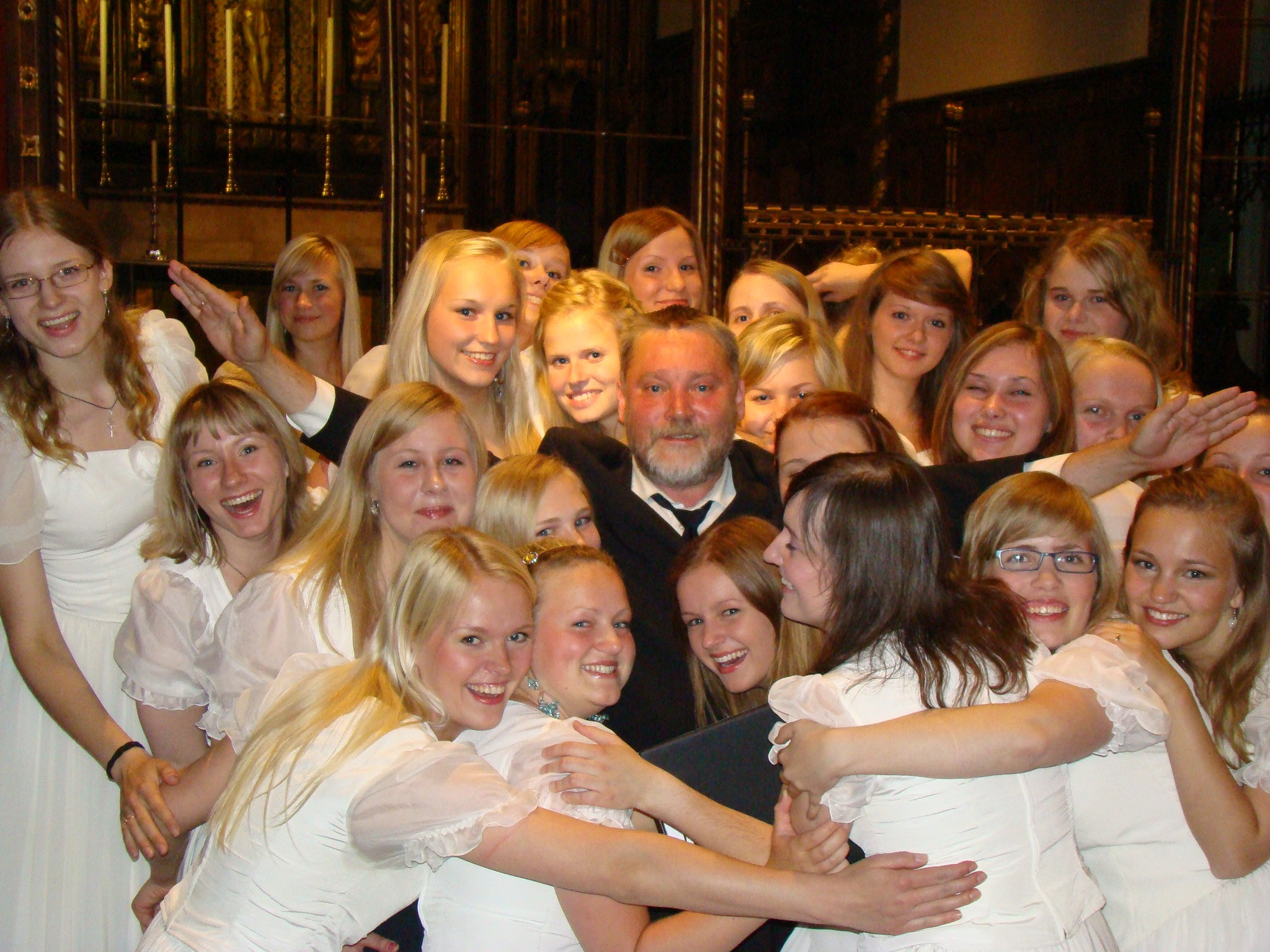
Estonian TV Girls' Choir with conductor Urmas Sisask at St Paul's cathedral in London, 2008

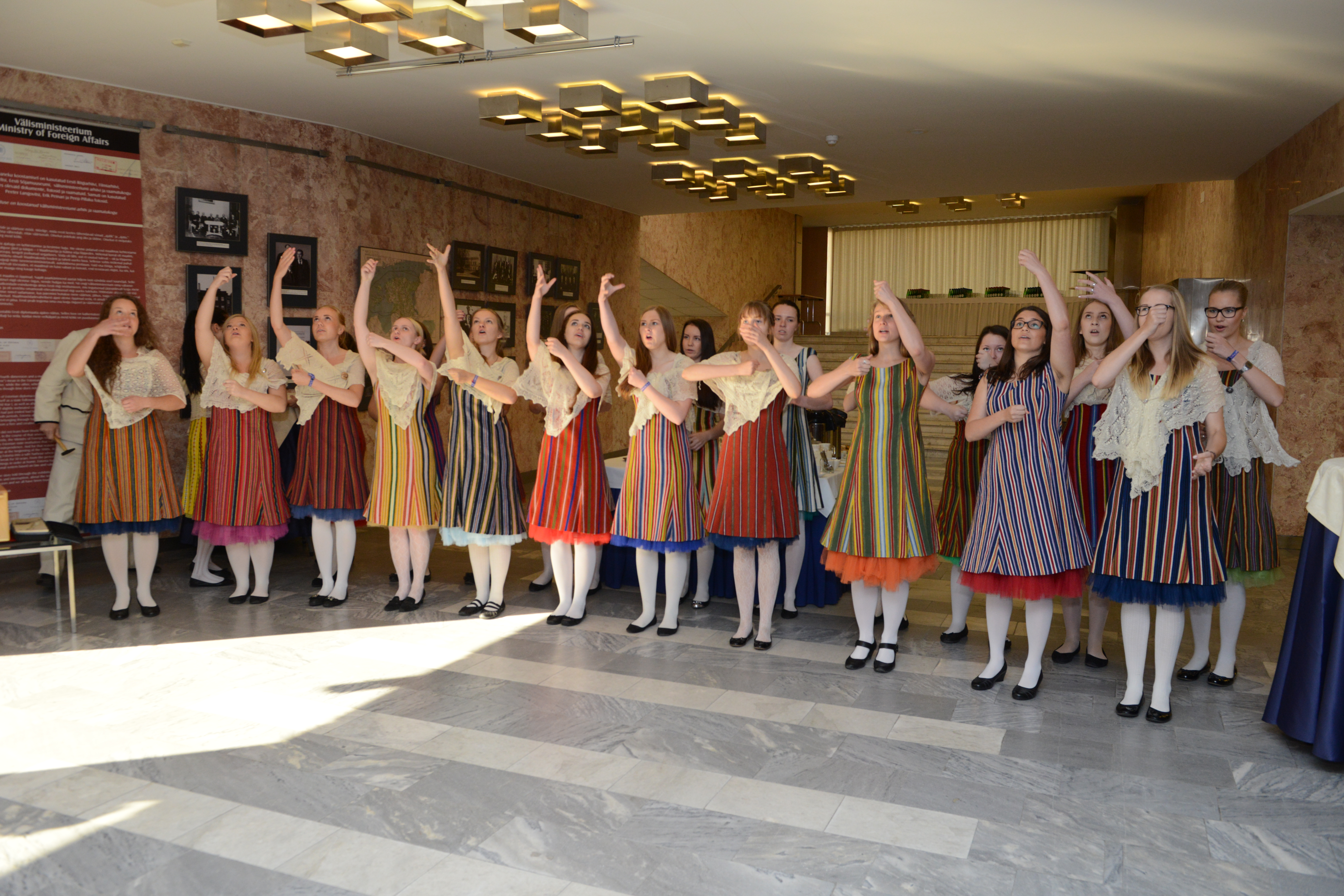
The choir in 2014

Estonian TV Girls' Choir (Estonian: ETV tütarlastekoor) is a choir established by Estonian Television. It grew out of the Children's Television Music Studio, which was founded in 1990. Today the choir comprises 30 singers aged from 14 to 20.

== Choir ==
The choir's repertoire includes spiritual and secular music of different ages, folk music, pop and jazz. It has collaborated with Estonian composers Arvo Pärt, Veljo Tormis, Urmas Sisask and Tõnis Mägi. The choir has appeared at international conferences, symposiums, and festivals including La Fabbrica del Canto in Italy, Polyfollia in France, and Sympaatti in Finland.

In 2001 the choir performed successfully in the international Competition of Choral Music in Gorizia, gaining the title of best female choir and best choir in all categories. In 2005 the choir won 1st prize in the youth category of the EBU's international competition Let The Peoples Sing. The girls also took part in the 2002 Eurovision Song Contest in Tallinn.

The choir has toured in countries including Australia, USA, Argentina, Great Britain, France, Netherlands, Italy, Switzerland, Spain, Andorra, and Portugal.

== Reception ==
In 2005, Nigel Hildreth, on a Finzi Trust travel scholarship, witnessed the ETV Girls' Choir rehearsing and described it as one of the world's best girls' choirs.

In 2008, when Estonia celebrated its 90th anniversary, the choir was chosen to bring one of Estonia's musical gifts, the composer Urmas Sisask's "Veni Creator Spiritus" to Great Britain; he conducted the choir on that occasion.

In 2012, they performed "to wide acclaim" at the Camden Roundhouse in London. The musician Brian Eno admired the choir, saying they "made me shiver, their performance of Veljo Tormis’ compositions was just stunning, I want to visit Estonia as soon as tomorrow!"

In 2014 the choir performed in the London Southbank Centre with a jazz ensemble, singing in a circle around the audience. The reviewer Adam Garrie, for Estonian World, described the school-age singers as having musical standards "higher than many professional choirs"; he felt that they "in many ways stole the show".

The choir represented Estonia in the 2017 Eurovision Choir of the Year competition. Lisa-Jayne Lewis, reviewing the competition for ESC Insight, called the choir's performance "a wonderful merging of choral singing and folk music, great openers to the show." Watching the show, the reviewer Iain Weaver thought their performance was good enough to win.
