= Ole Tøpholm =

Danish radio personality

Ole Tøpholm (born 9 October 1977 in Silkeborg) is a Danish radio host.

Tøpholm graduated in 2002 at Journalisthøjskolen with a journalism degree. Since 2000, he has been working for the Danish broadcaster DR as a reporter on Radioavisen and he is currently the morning news presenter for DR P3.

Tøpholm was the regular Danish commentator for the Eurovision Song Contest between 2011 and 2019, and resumed the role for the 2024 contest. A devoted fan since childhood, he was chairman of the Danish Eurovision fan club. He published a book Dansk Melodi Grand Prix – De største øjeblikke, devoted to Dansk Melodi Grand Prix.
