= Vanguard Visionaries (Sandy Bull album) =

Greatest hits album by Sandy Bull
- Released: June 12, 2007
- Recorded: 1963 – 1972
- Genre: Folk
- Length: 78:14
- Label: Vanguard
- Producer: Vince Hans

Sandy Bull chronology
Still Valentine's Day 1969 (2006)	Vanguard Visionaries (2007)	Sandy Bull & The Rhythm Ace Live 1976 (2012)

Professional ratings
Review scores
Source	Rating
Allmusic	4/5 stars

Vanguard Visionaries is a greatest hits compilation of folk guitarist Sandy Bull, released in 2007 through Vanguard Records. It comprises pieces from his first four albums.

== Track listing ==
No.	Title	Writer(s)	Album	Length
1.	"Electric Blend"	Bull	E Pluribus Unum	21:46
2.	"Manhã de Carnaval"	Bonfá	Inventions	13:02
3.	"Carmina Burana Fantasy"	Orff	Fantasias for Guitar and Banjo	4:34
4.	"Little Maggie"	Bull	Fantasias for Guitar and Banjo	4:10
5.	"Memphis, Tennessee"	Berry	Inventions	9:48
6.	"Gospel Tune"	Bull	Fantasias for Guitar and Banjo	10:01
7.	"Carnival Jump"	Bull	Demolition Derby	9:02
8.	"Triple Ballade"	de Machaut	Inventions	3:16
9.	"Last Date"	Cramer	Demolition Derby	2:35

== Personnel ==
- Sandy Bull – acoustic guitar, banjo, oud, bass guitar, guitar, percussion
- Denis Charles – tabla on "Carnival Jump"
- Billy Higgins – drums
- Vince Hans – production
