= Re-Inventions: Best of the Vanguard Years =

Greatest hits album by Sandy Bull
- Released: January 26, 1999
- Recorded: 1963 – 1972
- Genre: Folk
- Length: 75:32
- Label: Vanguard
- Producer: Tom Vickers

Sandy Bull chronology
Steel Tears (1996)	Re-Inventions: Best of the Vanguard Years (1999)	Still Valentine's Day 1969 (2006)

Professional ratings
Review scores
Source	Rating
Allmusic	4.5/5 stars
Entertainment Weekly	(A−)

Re-Inventions: Best of the Vanguard Years is a greatest hits compilation of folk guitarist Sandy Bull, released in 1999 through Vanguard Records. It comprises pieces from three of his albums: Fantasias for Guitar and Banjo, Inventions and Demolition Derby.

== Track listing ==
No.	Title	Writer(s)	Album	Length
1.	"Blend"	Bull	Fantasias for Guitar and Banjo	21:55
2.	"Manhã de Carnaval"	Bonfá	Inventions	13:00
3.	"Carmina Burana Fantasy"	Orff	Fantasias for Guitar and Banjo	4:32
4.	"Gospel Tune"	Bull	Fantasias for Guitar and Banjo	9:58
5.	"Little Maggie"	Bull	Fantasias for Guitar and Banjo	4:07
6.	"Memphis, Tennessee"	Berry	Inventions	9:46
7.	"Triple Ballade"	de Machaut	Inventions	3:13
8.	"Carnival Jump"	Bull	Demolition Derby	9:01

== Personnel ==
- Sandy Bull – acoustic guitar, banjo, oud, bass guitar, guitar, percussion
- Drew Cartwright – design
- Denis Charles – tabla on "Carnival Jump"
- David Gahr – photography
- Billy Higgins – drums
- Richard Knapp – photography
- Tom Vickers – production
- Jeff Zaraya – engineering
