= Margaret Bent =

English musicologist

- Born: Margaret Hilda Bassington; 23 December 1940 (age 85); United Kingdom
- Children: 1
- Awards: Dent Medal; Guggenheim Fellowship; Claude V. Palisca Award; Fellow of the British Academy (2016)

Academic background
- Education: Girton College, Cambridge (B.A., PhD)
- Doctoral advisors: Thurston Dart, Brian Trowell

Academic work
- Discipline: Medieval music, Old Hall Manuscript
- Institutions: All Souls College, Oxford, Oxford; Princeton University; Brandeis University; Goldsmiths, University of London; King's College London
- Notable students: Elizabeth Eva Leach

Margaret Bent CBE FBA, (born Margaret Hilda Bassington; 23 December 1940) is an English musicologist who specialises in music of the late medieval and Renaissance eras. In particular, she has written extensively on the Old Hall Manuscript, English masses as well as the works of Johannes Ciconia and John Dunstaple.

== Biography ==
Bent was educated at the Acton Haberdashers' Aske's School for Girls and Girton College, Cambridge (where she read music, was organ scholar, and is now an honorary fellow), receiving her BA in 1962 and PhD in 1969. She taught at Cambridge and King's College London after 1963, and became a lecturer at Goldsmiths' College in 1972. In 1975 she was appointed professor at Brandeis University and in 1981 at Princeton University, and served as department chair in both. Bent was president of the American Musicological Society (1984–1986), of which she is now a Corresponding Member. She returned to England in 1992 as senior research fellow at All Souls College, University of Oxford, where she is now an emeritus fellow.

== Research ==
Bent's research centres on English, French and Italian music of the fourteenth to sixteenth centuries and includes work on the medieval motet. Her study of the Old Hall Manuscript (both her 1969 dissertation and the edition, co-edited with Andrew Hughes, published in the Corpus Mensurabilis Musicae, 1969–73), was a key work in scholarship on early English music. Her studies of John Dunstaple, Philippe de Vitry, Guillaume de Machaut, the Roman de Fauvel, musica ficta and music and manuscripts in the Veneto, have all been highly influential; she was a pioneer in musical paleography and source studies. She co-founded and co-directed the Digital Image Archive of Medieval Music serves on many editorial boards of journals and publication series and contributed articles to the New Grove Dictionary of Music and Musicians. Her publications address technical matters of music theory, techniques of counterpoint, analysis, musica ficta, text-setting, and other issues that bridge notation and performance in early music, descriptions of new sources, aspects of musical transmission, stemmatics, and manuscript studies, interfaces with literary, historical and biographical questions.

== Awards and fellowships ==
Her awards include the Royal Musical Association's Dent Medal, a Guggenheim Fellowship, a Leverhulme Emeritus Fellowship, the Frank Llewellyn Harrison Medal of the Society for Musicology in Ireland, the Claude V. Palisca award of the American Musicological Society, and honorary doctorates from the universities of Glasgow, Notre Dame and Montréal.

She is a Fellow of the British Academy, Academia Europaea, the Royal Historical Society and All Souls College, Oxford, a Foreign Honorary Member of the American Academy of Arts and Sciences (1994), a Corresponding Fellow of the Medieval Academy of America, a distinguished senior fellow of the School of Advanced Study, London University, an International member of the American Philosophical Society, and was appointed CBE in 2008.

She was the recipient of a Festschrift: Citation and Authority in Medieval and Renaissance Musical Culture: Learning from the Learned: Essays in Honour of Margaret Bent (ed. Suzannah Clark and Elizabeth Eva Leach, Boydell & Brewer, 2005).

== Books ==
- The Old Hall Manuscript: a Paleographical Study (dissertation, U. of Cambridge, 1969)
- (ed., with Andrew Hughes) The Old Hall Manuscript, Corpus Mensurabilis Musicae, 1969–73)
- (ed.) Fifteenth-Century Liturgical Music II: Four Anonymous Masses. Early English Church Music, vol. 22 (London, 1979)
- Dunstaple (London, 1981)
- (ed., with Anne Hallmark) The Works of Johannes Ciconia (Monaco, 1985)
- (ed.) Rossini, Gioachino. Il Turco in Italia (Pesaro: Fondazione Rossini, 1988)
- (ed., with A. Wathey) Fauvel Studies: Allegory, Chronicle, Music, and Image in Paris, Bibliothèque Nationale de France, MS français 146 (Oxford, 1998)
- Counterpoint, Composition, and Musica Ficta (London and New York, 2002)
- Bologna Q15: The Making and Remaking of a Musical Manuscript: Introductory Study and Facsimile Edition (Lucca, 2008).
- Magister Jacobus de Ispania, author of the Speculum musicae (Farnham, 2015).

== See also ==
- Women in musicology

== Sources ==
- Andrew Wathey, "Margaret Bent". The New Grove Dictionary of Music and Musicians online.
