= Psychedelic folk =

Music genre

- Other names: Acid folk; freak folk
- Stylistic origins: Psychedelia; folk
- Cultural origins: Mid to late-1960s, United States and United Kingdom
- Derivative forms: New Weird America; Wyrd folk

Subgenres
- Freak folk

Other topics
- Anti-folk; neofolk; list of artists; indie folk; free folk; folk punk; folk rock; neo-psychedelia; progressive country; progressive folk; progressive rock; psychedelic pop; psychedelic soul

Psychedelic folk (also known as acid folk) is a loosely defined form of psychedelic music that originated in the 1960s. It retains the largely acoustic instrumentation of folk, but adds musical elements common to psychedelia.

== Characteristics and terminology ==
Psychedelic folk generally favours acoustic instrumentation although it often incorporates other instrumentation. Chanting, early music and various non-European folk music influences are often found in psych folk. Much like its rock counterpart, psychedelic folk is often known for a peculiar, trance-like, and atmospheric sound, often drawing on musical improvisation and Asian influences.

=== Acid folk ===
The term acid folk was coined in late 1969 by Australian journalist Lillian Roxon to describe the music of Pearls Before Swine. In her Rock Encyclopedia, she explained:

We already know about acid rock. What the underground group called Pearls Before Swine sings is acid folk, that is folk music affected by the discoveries of an LSD-influenced generation.

In Seasons They Change: The Story of Acid and Psychedelic Folk (2010), author Jeanette Leech states that the term "acid folk" was a "perfect summation" of the music of Pearls Before Swine and similar acts:

It wasn’t folk music made under the influence of LSD per se but folk music profoundly affected by the attitudes of exploration that also prompted the use of hallucinogens. Furthermore, Roxon’s term also held resonance for the other meanings of the word ‘acid’ in the sense of tartness or a corrosive, uncomfortable sensation.

The term was nonetheless not used widely until some time after it was coined. Tom Rapp of Pearls Before Swine commented that "acid folk as a label is fine in that it implies borderlessness."

== History ==
=== 1960s: Peak years ===
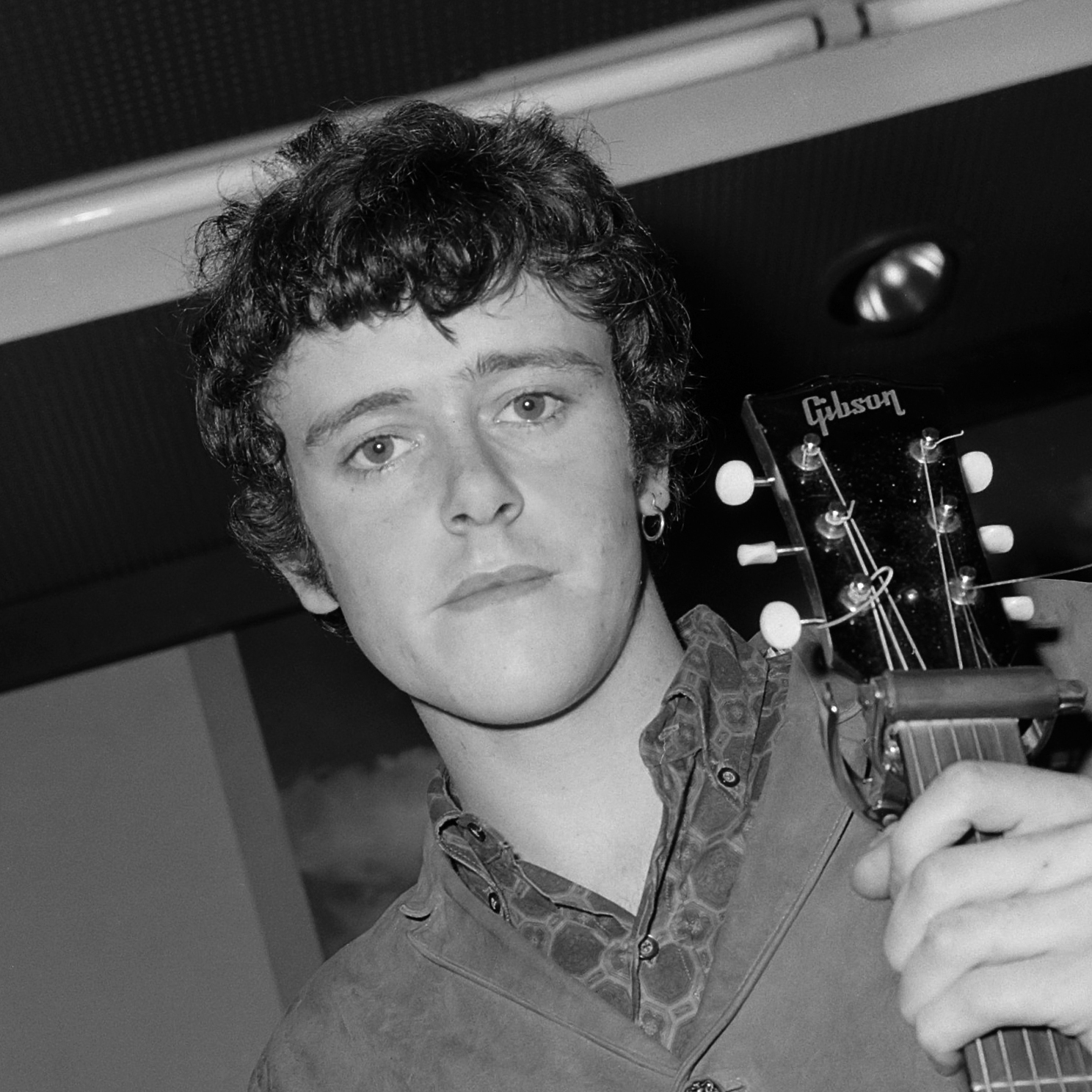
Donovan in 1965

The first musical use of the term psychedelic is thought to have been by the New York–based folk group The Holy Modal Rounders on their version of Lead Belly's "Hesitation Blues" in 1964. Guitarist John Fahey recorded several songs in the early 1960s that experimented with unusual recording techniques, including backward tapes, and novel instrumental accompaniment. Music critic Richie Unterberger stated that the opening track to Fahey's The Great San Bernardino Birthday Party & Other Excursions (1966) "anticipated elements of psychedelia with its nervy improvisations and odd guitar tunings". Additionally, Pitchfork writer Jason Heller stated, "While the world went trippy, Fahey formed a parallel psychedelic dimension that was also manifested in his copious, semi-fictional, self-penned liner notes, which mixed serious musicology with a prankish smirk".

Similarly, folk guitarist Sandy Bull's early work "incorporated elements of folk, jazz, and Indian and Arabic-influenced dronish modes". His 1963 album Fantasias for Guitar and Banjo explores various styles and instrumentation and "could also be accurately described as one of the very first psychedelic records". Later albums, such as 1968's E Pluribus Unum and his live album Still Valentine's Day 1969, which use experimental recording techniques and extended improvisation, also have psychedelic elements.

Musicians with several groups that became identified with psychedelic rock began as folk musicians, such as those with the Grateful Dead, Jefferson Airplane, Country Joe and the Fish, Quicksilver Messenger Service, The Beau Brummels from San Francisco; the Byrds, Love, Kaleidoscope, and the Peanut Butter Conspiracy from Los Angeles; Pearls Before Swine from Florida; and Jake and the Family Jewels, and Cat Mother & the All Night Newsboys from New York. The Serpent Power was a psychedelic rock group with a strong folk influence. The Byrds was the most important American folk-rock band to incorporate psychedelia in their sound and themes.

In the UK, folk artists who were particularly significant included Marc Bolan, with his hippy duo Tyrannosaurus Rex, who used unusual instrumentation and tape effects, typified by the album Unicorn (1969), and Scottish performers such as Donovan, who combined influences of American artists like Bob Dylan with references to flower power, and the Incredible String Band, who from 1967 incorporated a range of influences into their acoustic-based music, including medieval and eastern instruments. During the late 1960s and early 1970s, solo acts such as Syd Barrett and Nick Drake began to incorporate psychedelic influences into folk music with albums such as Barrett's The Madcap Laughs and Drake's Five Leaves Left. Underground artists such as Simon Finn would later be referred to as "acid folk".

By the late 1960s, the influence of psychedelic and acid folk could be felt in pop music. Pop records would sometimes include one or two psychedelic or acid folk tracks, like "Flowers in the Air" on Sally Eaton's Farewell American Tour (1970).

=== 1970s: Decline ===
In the mid-1970s, psychedelia fell out of fashion and those folk groups that had not already moved into different areas had largely disbanded. In Britain, folk groups also tended to electrify, as did acoustic duo Tyrannosaurus Rex, which became the electric combo T. Rex. This was a continuation of a process by which progressive folk had considerable impact on mainstream rock.

=== Since 1990s: Revival ===
Independent and underground folk artists in the late 1990s led to a revival of psychedelic folk with the New Weird America movement. Also, Animal Collective's early albums identify closely with freak folk as does their collaboration with veteran British folk artist Vashti Bunyan, and The Microphones/Mount Eerie, who combine naturalistic elements with lo-fi and psychedelia. Both artists received significant exposure in the indie music scene following critical acclaim from review site Pitchfork Media and soon more artists began experimenting with the genre, including OCS, Quilt, Grizzly Bear, Devendra Banhart, Rodrigo Amarante, Ben Howard and Grouper.

In 2022, Uncut magazine published a CD called Blackwaterside: Sounds of the New Weird Albion, featuring artists including Jim Ghedi, Henry Parker, Jon Wilks, Sam Lee, and Cath Tyler. This led to the publication of an extensive exploration of Britain's new "weird folk" in Japanese music magazine Ele-King. The lead article looked at artists including Nick Hart, Burd Ellen, Elspeth Anne, Frankie Archer, Shovel Dance Collective and Angeline Morrison.

== Related genres ==
=== Freak folk ===
Freak folk is a loosely defined subgenre of psychedelic folk associated with the 2000s New Weird America movement and used to describe the work of artists such as Joanna Newsom, Devendra Banhart, Animal Collective, and Adem.

== See also ==
- Ptolemaic Terrascope – a psychedelic folk & rock magazine
- Jam bands
- Freak scene
- Neil Young

== Bibliography ==
- Auslander, Philip (2006). Performing Glam Rock: Gender and Theatricality in Popular Music. Ann Arbor: University of Michigan Press. ISBN 978-0-472-06868-5.
- DeRogatis, Jim (2003). Turn On Your Mind: Four Decades of Great Psychedelic Rock. Milwaukee, WI: Hal Leonard. ISBN 978-0-634-05548-5.
- Hermes, Will (June 18, 2006). "Summer of Love Redux". The New York Times.
- Hicks, Michael (2000). Sixties Rock: Garage, Psychedelic, and Other Satisfactions. University of Illinois Press. ISBN 978-0-252-06915-4.
- Leech, Jeanette (2010). Seasons They Change: The Story of Acid and Psychedelic Folk. London: Jawbone Press. ISBN 978-1-906002-32-9.
- Macan, Edward (1997). Rocking the Classics: English Progressive Rock and the Counterculture. New York: Oxford University Press. ISBN 978-0-19-509888-4.
- Sweers, Britta (2005). Electric Folk: The Changing Face of English Traditional Music. New York: Oxford University Press. ISBN 978-0-19-515878-6.
- Unterberger, Richie (2002). Turn! Turn! Turn!: The '60s Folk-rock Revolution. San Francisco: Backbeat Books. ISBN 978-0-87930-703-5.
