= Psychedelic era =

Time of cultural change influenced by psychedelic drugs

- 1965–1969
| Beat Generation |
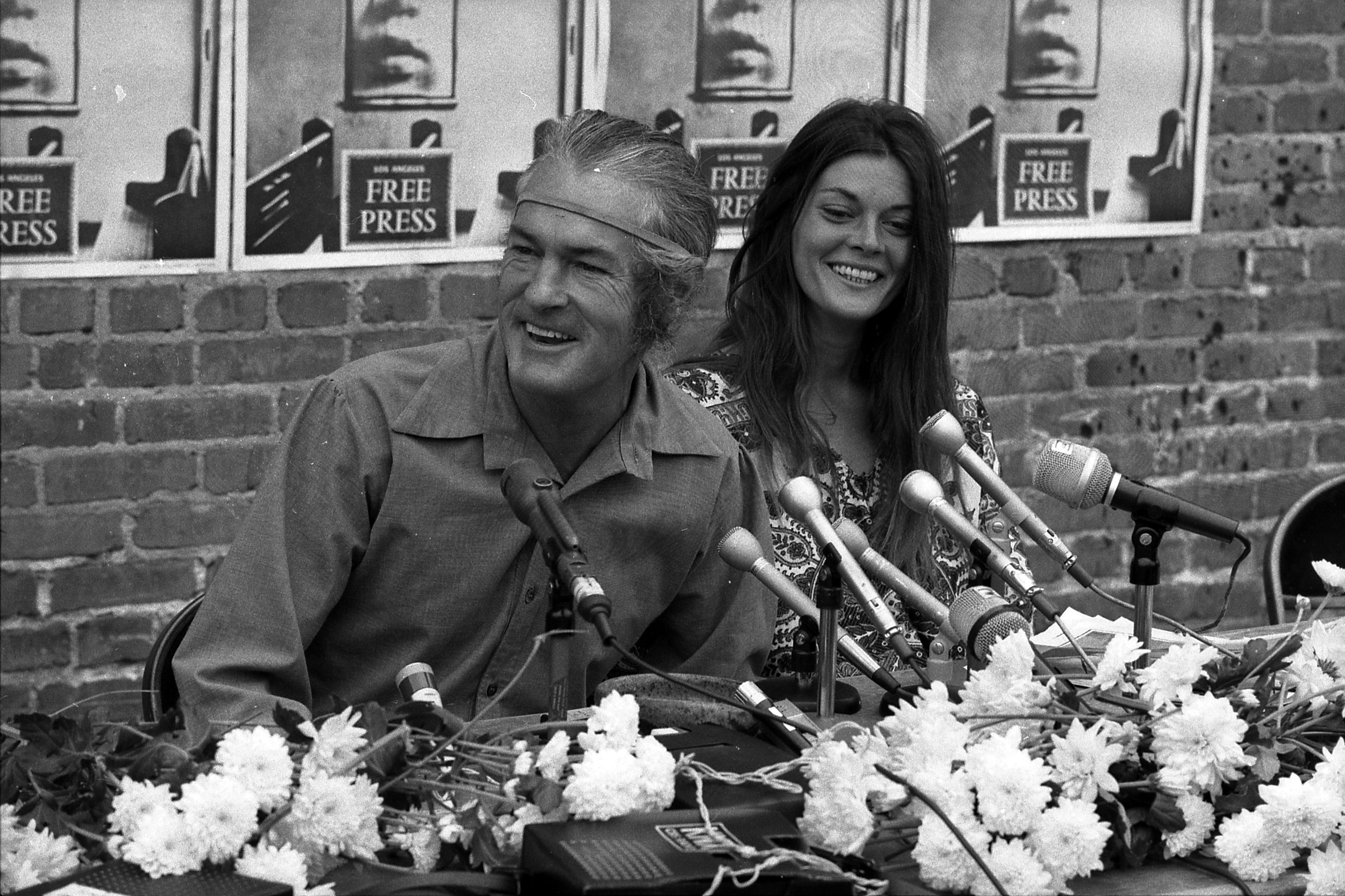
- Timothy Leary and wife Rosemary Woodruff at press conference, 1969.
- Leader(s): Alan Watts, Timothy Leary, Ralph Metzner and Ram Dass
- Key events: Human Be-In; Summer of Love

The psychedelic era was the time of social, musical and artistic change influenced by psychedelic drugs, occurring from the mid-1960s to the mid-1970s. The era was defined by the proliferation of LSD and its following influence on the development of psychedelic music and psychedelic film in the Western world.

Writers who explored the potentials of consciousness exploration in the psychedelic era included Alan Watts, Timothy Leary, Ralph Metzner and Ram Dass among others; an important journal of the time was The Psychedelic Review.

== History ==
=== Origins ===
Throughout the 1950s, mainstream media reported on research into LSD and its growing use in psychiatry, and undergraduate psychology students taking LSD as part of their education described the effects of the drug. Time magazine published six positive reports on LSD between 1954 and 1959.

From the second half of the 1950s, Beat Generation writers like William Burroughs, Jack Kerouac and Allen Ginsberg wrote about and took drugs, including cannabis and Benzedrine, raising awareness and helping to popularise their use. In the early 1960s, the use of LSD and other psychedelics was advocated by new proponents of consciousness expansion such as Timothy Leary, Alan Watts, Aldous Huxley and Arthur Koestler, and, according to Laurence Veysey, they profoundly influenced the thinking of the new generation of youth.

=== Cultural influence ===
The psychedelic lifestyle had already developed in California, particularly in San Francisco, by the mid-1960s, with the first major underground LSD factory established by Owsley Stanley. From 1964, the Merry Pranksters, a loose group that developed around novelist Ken Kesey, sponsored the Acid Tests, a series of events involving the taking of LSD (supplied by Stanley), accompanied by light shows, film projection and discordant, improvised music by the Grateful Dead (financed by Stanley), then known as the Warlocks, known as the psychedelic symphony. The Pranksters helped popularise LSD use, through their road trips across America in a psychedelically decorated converted school bus, which involved distributing the drug and meeting with major figures of the beat movement, and through publications about their activities such as Tom Wolfe's The Electric Kool-Aid Acid Test (1968).

San Francisco had an emerging music scene of folk clubs, coffee houses and independent radio stations that catered to the population of students at nearby Berkeley and the free thinkers that had gravitated to the city. There was already a culture of drug use among jazz and blues musicians, and in the early 1960s use of drugs including cannabis, peyote, mescaline and LSD began to grow among folk and rock musicians. One of the first musical uses of the term "psychedelic" in the folk scene was by the New York-based folk group The Holy Modal Rounders on their version of Lead Belly's 'Hesitation Blues' in 1964. Folk/avant-garde guitarist John Fahey recorded several songs in the early 1960s experimented with unusual recording techniques, including backwards tapes, and novel instrumental accompaniment including flute and sitar. His nineteen-minute "The Great San Bernardino Birthday Party" "anticipated elements of psychedelia with its nervy improvisations and odd guitar tunings". Similarly, folk guitarist Sandy Bull's early work "incorporated elements of folk, jazz, and Indian and Arabic-influenced dronish modes". His album Fantasias for Guitar and Banjo (1963) explores various styles and "could also be accurately described as one of the very first psychedelic records".

Soon musicians began to refer (at first indirectly, and later explicitly) to the drug and attempted to recreate or reflect the experience of taking LSD in their music, just as it was reflected in psychedelic art, literature and film. This trend ran in parallel in both America and Britain and as part of the interconnected folk and rock scenes. As pop music began incorporating psychedelic sounds, the genre emerged as a mainstream and commercial force. Psychedelic rock reached its peak in the last years of the decade. From 1967 to 1968, it was the prevailing sound of rock music, either in the whimsical British variant, or the harder American West Coast acid rock. In America, the 1967 Summer of Love was prefaced by the Human Be-In event and reached its peak at the Monterey International Pop Festival. These trends climaxed in the 1969 Woodstock Festival, which saw performances by most of the major psychedelic acts, including Jimi Hendrix, Janis Joplin, Jefferson Airplane and Santana.

By the end of the 1960s, the trend of exploring psychedelia in music was largely in retreat. LSD was declared illegal in the United States and the United Kingdom in 1966. The linking of the murders of Sharon Tate and Leno and Rosemary LaBianca by the Manson Family to Beatles songs such as "Helter Skelter" contributed to an anti-hippie backlash. The Altamont Free Concert in California, headlined by The Rolling Stones and Jefferson Airplane on December 6, 1969, did not turn out to be a positive milestone in the psychedelic music scene, as was anticipated; instead, it became notorious for the fatal stabbing of a black teenager Meredith Hunter by Hells Angels security guards.

== See also ==
- Acid rock
- Counterculture of the 1960s
- Hippie
- History of LSD
- Psychedelia (film) – Film about the history of psychedelic drugs
- Psychedelic
- Psychedelic art
- Psychedelic experience
- Psychedelic film
- Psychedelic music
- Psychedelicism
