= Douce Dame Jolie =

14th century song by Guillaume de Machaut

MIDI rendering

"Douce Dame Jolie", sometimes referred to only as 'Douce Dame', is a song from the 14th century, by the French composer Guillaume de Machaut. The song is a virelai, belonging to the style ars nova, and is one of the most often heard medieval tunes today. Many modern recordings omit the lyrics, however.

One of the most famous musical pieces of the Middle Ages, 'Douce Dame' has been performed by a plethora of artists, mostly but not always in medieval style. Among others are Annwn (with lyrics), Ayragon (with lyrics), Theo Bleckmann (with lyrics), Els Berros de la Cort, Corvus Corax, Schelmish (with lyrics), Dr Cosgill, Fable of the Bees, Filia Irata, Två fisk och en fläsk (with lyrics), Wisby Vaganter, A La Via! (with lyrics), Lisa Lynne, The John Renbourn Group (with English lyrics), WirrWahr, Wolfenmond, Saltatio Mortis, Angels of Venice (soprano Christina Linhardt, harpist Carol Tatum) and Legião Urbana (no lyrics, named "A Ordem dos Templários" (The Templar Order))

== Lyrics ==
Original French

Douce dame jolie,
Pour dieu ne pensés mie
Que nulle ait signorie
Seur moy fors vous seulement.

Qu'adès sans tricherie
Chierie
Vous ay et humblement
Tous les jours de ma vie
Servie
Sans villain pensement.

Helas! et je mendie
D'esperance et d'aïe;
Dont ma joie est fenie,
Se pité ne vous en prent.

Douce dame jolie...

Mais vo douce maistrie
Maistrie
Mon cuer si durement
Qu'elle le contralie
Et lie
En amour tellement

Qu'il n'a de riens envie
Fors d'estre en vo baillie;
Et se ne li ottrie
Vos cuers nul aligement.

Douce dame jolie...

Et quant ma maladie
Garie
Ne sera nullement
Sans vous, douce anemie,
Qui lie
Estes de mon tourment,

A jointes mains deprie
Vo cuer, puis qu'il m'oublie,
Que temprement m'ocie,
Car trop langui longuement.

Douce dame jolie...

Modern French translation

Douce dame jolie,
Pour (l’amour de) Dieu, ne pensez pas
dehors de vous seule
autre règne sur moi

(et songez) Que toujours sans tricherie
Chérie
(je) vous ai humblement
Servie
Tous les jours de ma vie
Sans viles arrière-pensées.

Hélas! Et je mendie
L’espoir d’un réconfort
Et ma joie va s’éteindre
Si vous ne me prenez en pitié

Douce dame jolie...

Mais votre douce domination
Domine
Mon cœur si durement
Qu'elle le contrarie
Et le lie
En amour grandement

Qu'il n'a d’autre envie
Que d’être en votre compagnie
Mais votre cœur
Ne me donne aucun signe d’espoir.

Douce dame jolie...

Et ma maladie
Guérie
Jamais ne sera
Sans vous, douce ennemie,
Qui vous régalez
De mon tourment.

À mains jointes, je prie
Votre cœur, puisqu'il m'oublie,
Qu’il me tue, par pitié,
Car il a trop langui.

Douce dame jolie...

English translation

Sweet, lovely lady,
for God's sake do not think
that any has sovereignty
over my heart but you alone.

For always, without treachery,
Cherished one,
Have I you, and humbly,
Served
All the days of my life
Without base thoughts.

Alas, I am left begging
For hope of comfort,
And my joy will fade
If you do not take pity on me.

Sweet, lovely lady...

But your sweet mastery
Masters
My heart so harshly,
Tormenting it
And binding it
In unbearable love,

So that [my heart] desires nothing
but to be in your company,
And still, your own heart
gives me no sign of hope.

Sweet, lovely lady...

And since my malady
Healed
Will never be
Without you, Sweet Enemy,
Who takes
Delight in my torment,

With clasped hands, I beseech
Your heart, that it forget me,
That it mercifully kill me,
For too long have I languished.

Sweet, lovely lady...

== See also ==
- Courtly love
- Medieval music
- Guillaume de Machaut
- List of compositions by Guillaume de Machaut
