= Elizabeth Eva Leach =

British musicologist and music theorist

- Born: Elizabeth Eva Leach; United Kingdom
- Awards: Dent Medal (2013); Fellow of the British Academy (2016)

Academic background
- Education: Magdalen College, Oxford (BA, MA, DPhil)
- Doctoral advisor: Margaret Bent

Academic work
- Discipline: Medieval music
- Institutions: St Hugh's College and Exeter College, Oxford; Royal Holloway
- Notable works: Sung Birds (2007); Guillaume de Machaut (2011)

Elizabeth Eva Leach FBA is a British musicologist and music theorist who specializes in medieval music, especially that of the fourteenth century. Much of her scholarship concerns the life and work of Guillaume de Machaut.

== Life and career ==
Leach is a professor of music at St Hugh's College, Oxford (a constituent college of the University of Oxford), where she lectures on the music of Guillaume de Machaut and the trouvères. She has written extensively on Machaut as well as birdsong and nature in the medieval music. In 2016 she was elected as a Fellow of the British Academy.

Leach's major publications include Sung Birds: Music, Nature, and Poetry in the Later Middle Ages (2007) and Guillaume de Machaut: Secretary, Poet, Musician (2011), which received the Phyllis Goodhart Gordan Prize from The Renaissance Society of America. Music historian Alice V. Clark remarked that Leach's Guillaume de Machaut: Secretary, Poet, Musician will become will "likely become the standard monograph study of Machaut’s life and works".

== Selected publications ==
Books

- Leach, Elizabeth Eva, ed. (2003). Machaut's Music: New Interpretations. Suffolk: Boydell Press. ISBN 978-1-84383-016-0.
- ——; Clark, Suzannah, eds. (2005). Citation and Authority in Medieval and Renaissance Musical Culture: Learning from the Learned. Suffolk: Boydell Press. ISBN 978-1-84383-166-2.
- —— (2007). Sung Birds: Music, Nature, and Poetry in the Later Middle Ages. Ithaca: Cornell University Press. ISBN 978-0-8014-4491-3.
- —— (2011). Guillaume de Machaut: Secretary, Poet, Musician. Ithaca: Cornell University Press. ISBN 978-90-5867-876-8.
- ——; Deeming, Helen, eds. (2015). Manuscripts and Medieval Song: Inscription, Performance, Context. Cambridge: Cambridge University Press. ISBN 978-1-107-06263-4.
- —— (2023). Medieval Sex Lives: The Sounds of Courtly Intimacy on the Francophone Borders. Ithaca: Cornell University Press. ISBN 978-1-5017-7188-0.

Chapters

- Leach, Elizabeth Eva (2011). "The Fourteenth Century". In Everist, Mark (ed.). The Cambridge Companion to Medieval Music. Cambridge: Cambridge University Press. ISBN 978-0-19-316303-4.
- —— (2017). "Performing Manuscripts". In Butterfield, Ardis; Hope, Henry; Souleau, Pauline (eds.). Performing Medieval Text. Cambridge: Modern Humanities Research Association. pp. 11–19. doi:10.2307/j.ctv16kkz85. ISBN 978-1-78188-379-2. JSTOR j.ctv16kkz85.

Articles

- Leach, Elizabeth Eva (Spring 2000). "Counterpoint and Analysis in Fourteenth-Century Song". Journal of Music Theory. 44 (1): 45–79. doi:10.2307/3090669. JSTOR 3090669.
- —— (October 2000). "Interpretation and Counterpoint: The Case of Guillaume de Machaut's 'De toutes flours' (B31)". Music Analysis. 19 (3): 321–351. doi:10.1111/1468-2249.00123. JSTOR 854458.
- —— (May 2001). "Vicars of 'Wannabe': Authenticity and the Spice Girls". Popular Music. 20 (2). Cambridge University Press: 143–167. doi:10.1017/S0261143001001386. JSTOR 853649. S2CID 162848598.
- —— (Summer 2002). "Death of a Lover and the Birth of the Polyphonic Ballade: Machaut's Notated Ballades 1–5". The Journal of Musicology. 19 (3): 461–502. doi:10.1525/jm.2002.19.3.461. JSTOR 10.1525/jm.2002.19.3.461.
- —— (May 2005). "Learning French by Singing in 14th-Century England". Early Music. 33 (2): 253–268+270. doi:10.1093/em/cah069. JSTOR 3519451.
- —— (February 2010). "Guillaume de Machaut, royal almoner: Honte, paour (B25) and Donnez, signeurs (B26) in context". Early Music. 38 (1): 21–42. doi:10.1093/em/caq006. JSTOR 40731308.
- —— (July 2010). "Music and Verbal Meaning: Machaut's Polytextual Songs". Speculum. 85 (3): 567–591. doi:10.1017/S0038713410001302. JSTOR 27866936. S2CID 162617845.
- —— (6 January 2021). "Ripping romance to ribbons: the French of a German knight in the Tournament at Chauvency". Medium Ævum. 89 (2). Society for the Study of Mediaeval Languages and Literature: 327–349. doi:10.2307/27089793. ISSN 0025-8385. JSTOR 27089793. S2CID 254436508.
- —— (24 February 2021). "Which Came First, the Demandes d'amours or the Jeu-Parti? Evidence from Oxford, Bodleian Library, MS Douce 308". Music and Letters. 102 (1). Oxford University Press: 1–29. doi:10.1093/ml/gcaa089.
