= Geoffrey T. Hellman =

American journalist (1907–1977)

- Born: February 13, 1907; New York City, United States
- Died: September 26, 1977 (aged 70); New York City, United States
- Education: Yale University
- Occupation: Writer
- Employers: Life; The New Yorker
- Spouses: Daphne Hellman; Katherine (Henry) Hellman
- Parent: George S. Hellman

Geoffrey Theodore Hellman (February 13, 1907 – September 26, 1977) was an American journalist and staff writer for The New Yorker.

== Early life ==
Hellman was the son of writer and rare-books dealer George S. Hellman. Born in New York City, he was also the great-grandson of banking titan Joseph Seligman, and thus, by ancestry, part of the city's German-Jewish elite who referred to themselves as Our Crowd.

He attended Taft School and Yale University where he contributed to the Yale Daily News, the Yale Literary Magazine and campus humor magazine The Yale Record.

== Career ==
Upon graduating in 1928, he wrote for the New York Herald Tribune's Sunday book supplement thanks to a recommendation by Thornton Wilder. By 1929, he secured a position at The New Yorker magazine as a reporter for the "Talk of the Town" section. Though he contributed to numerous publications in his career, he would be affiliated and most firmly identified with The New Yorker.

While with The New Yorker, Hellman wrote extensively about New York institutions such as the New York Zoological Society and the Bronx Zoo, the Metropolitan Museum of Art, the Metropolitan Opera House, the Museum of Modern Art, the New York Public Library, the Pierpont Morgan Library, the United Nations, and the New York Stock Exchange, to promote public awareness of these institutions and of interesting events they sponsored. He also wrote about prominent people such as author Louis Auchincloss; New York Parks Commissioner Robert Moses, who sent him story ideas; and architect Frank Lloyd Wright. Because of his background and family connections, he was also The New Yorker's link to Manhattan society, reporting on parties, local clubs and societies such as the Grolier Club, The Explorers Club, the National Audubon Society, and the American Geographical Society, and exclusive restaurants, from which he collected an impressive number of menus.

His books include compilations of his pieces that appeared in The New Yorker ('Mother Taft's Chickens,' 'How to Disappear for an Hour' and 'Mrs. De Peyster's Parties') and a book about the Smithsonian Institution ('Octopus on the Mall') and a history of the American Museum of Natural History ('Bankers, Bones and Beetles'). As recently as June 2013 his research for a 1940 profile on Robert Ripley was cited for its exhaustive scope in a review of the latest Ripley biography.

From 1936 to 1938, he was also the associate editor of Life magazine.

During World War II, Hellman was in Washington D.C. where he wrote for the Office of the Coordinator of Inter-American Affairs, the War Department and helped to write a top-secret history of the OSS.

In addition to his pursuits as a writer, Hellman was an enthusiastic butterfly collector.

== Marriage and family life ==
Hellman's distinguished wife, with whom he had an affair as her first marriage was falling apart, was Daphne Hellman, a banking heiress who became a highly admired jazz harpist. They married in Reno, Nevada in 1941 just hours after her divorce from magazine editor Harry A. Bull. Their daughter, herself a musician, is sitar player Daisy Paradis. The couple also had an adopted son, Digger St. John. At some point in the marriage, Hellman left Daphne for another woman and the couple divorced in or around 1958. (Coincidentally, Daphne's only child with first husband Harry Bull was also a musician—prominent folk guitarist Sandy Bull, who died in 2001 at age 60. Daphne Hellman died a year later, at age 86.)

In 1960, Hellman married Katherine Henry, with whom he had a daughter, Katharine Hellman.

Hellman died of cancer in 1977 at his 171 East 71st Street, Manhattan home. He was survived by a sister, Rhoda Hellman.

== Bibliography ==
=== Books ===
- Hellman, Geoffrey T. How to disappear for an hour.
- Mrs. De Peyster's parties
- Octopus on the Mall
- Bankers, bones and beetles

=== Essays and reporting ===
- Hellman, Geoffrey T. (April 22, 1950). "Census director". The Talk of the Town. The New Yorker. 26 (9): 23–24.
- — (January 7, 1974). "Good news from New Haven". The Talk of the Town. The New Yorker. 49 (46): 24–25.
