= Steel Tears =

Studio album by Sandy Bull
- Released: 1996
- Genre: Folk
- Label: Timeless Recording Society
- Producer: Sandy Bull

Sandy Bull chronology
Vehicles (1992)	Steel Tears (1996)	Re-Inventions: Best of the Vanguard Years (1999)

Steel Tears is the seventh album by folk guitarist Sandy Bull, released in 1996 through Timeless Recording Society. It was Bull's final album before his death in 2001.

== Track listing ==
No.	Title	Writer(s)	Length
1.	"ARABALABAMA"	Bull
2.	"Long as We're Dreaming"	Jones
3.	"Can I Get a Witness"	Gaye
4.	"Old Habits Like You"	Williams, Jr.
5.	"Love Is Forever"	Ocean
6.	"I Don't Care"	Pierce
7.	"It Should Be Easier Now"	Jennings, Nelson
8.	"My Baby Left Me"	Crudup
9.	"Steel Tears"	Bull
10.	"Sideshow"	Blue Magic
11.	"I May Never Pass Out"	Bull

== Personnel ==
- Sandy Bull – vocals, guitar
