= Lyn Christie =

Australian-born American-based musical artist (1928–2020)

- Born: Lyndon Van Christie; 3 August 1928; Sydney, New South Wales, Australia
- Died: 28 March 2020 (aged 91)
- Genres: Jazz, Classical
- Occupation(s): Musician, medical practitioner
- Instruments: Double bass; electric bass; keyboards

Lyndon Van Christie (3 August 1928 – 28 March 2020) was an Australian-born American-based jazz bassist. He earned a medical degree from Otago Medical School, New Zealand, and, while practising as a physician in Sydney from 1961, played in the local jazz scene until he moved to New York City in 1965.

In New York, he worked as chief medical resident at Yonkers General Hospital (1966–68), continued to play jazz and attended the Juilliard School of Music studying with Homer Mensch (1968–69). Christie played with a variety of fellow jazz musicians including Ahmad Jamal, Jaki Byard, Chet Baker, Paul Winter, Buddy Rich, Toshiko Akiyoshi, Tal Farlow and many others. He was the regular bass player in harpist Daphne Hellman's trio, Hellman's Angels.

In the 1970s he established a teaching position and eventually became director emeritus of jazz studies at Westchester Conservatory in New York State.
