= Lindenwold (Morristown, New Jersey) =

- U.S. National Register of Historic Places
- New Jersey Register of Historic Places
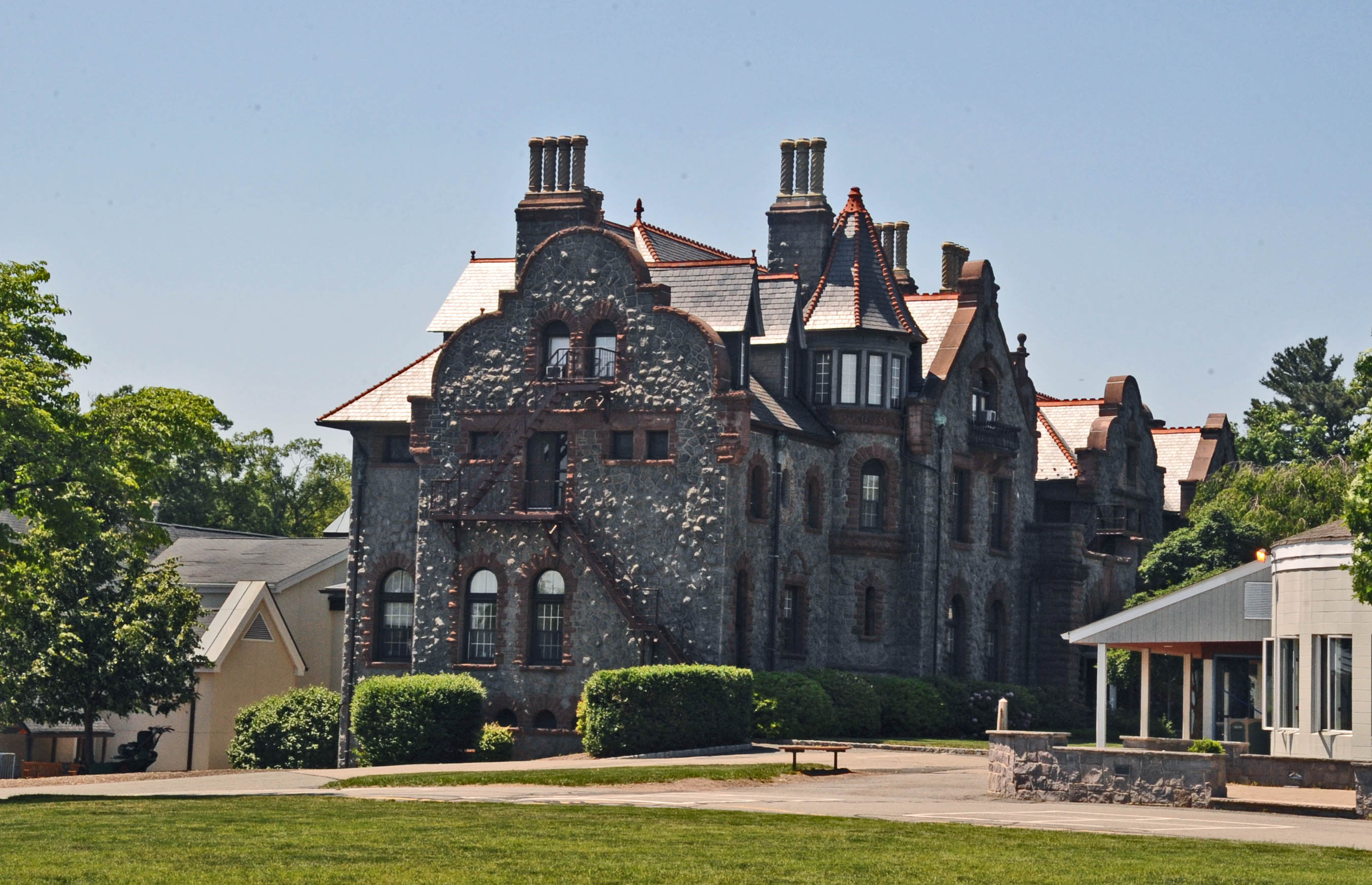

- Location within Morris County, New Jersey Location within New Jersey Location within the United States
- Location: 247 South Street; Morristown, New Jersey
- Coordinates: 40°47′40″N 74°29′04″W
- Built: 1886
- Architectural style: Gothic, Tudor Revival
- MPS: Morristown Multiple Resource Area
- NRHP reference No.: 86003113
- NJRHP No.: 2188

Significant dates
- Added to NRHP: November 13, 1986
- Designated NJRHP: September 11, 1986

Lindenwold is a historic stone mansion located at 247 South Street on the campus of the Peck School in the town of Morristown in Morris County, New Jersey. Part of the Morristown Multiple Resource Area (MRA), it was added to the National Register of Historic Places on November 13, 1986, for its significance in architecture.

== History and description ==
Lindenwold is a two and one-half story stone building featuring Victorian Gothic architecture with Jacobean Revival and Queen Anne motifs. The earliest section was constructed in 1886 by William B. Skidmore for his family residence. He was married to Julia Cobb, daughter of George T. Cobb, a mayor of Morristown. In 1905, the Skidmore estate sold the property to John Claflin, who added a west wing by 1910. In 1947, the mansion was sold to the Peck School, a private elementary day school.

== See also ==
- National Register of Historic Places listings in Morris County, New Jersey
