= Jukebox School of Music =

Studio album by Sandy Bull
- Released: 1988
- Genre: Folk
- Length: 60:38
- Label: ROM
- Producer: Sandy Bull

Sandy Bull chronology
Demolition Derby (1972)	Jukebox School of Music (1988)	Vehicles (1992)

Professional ratings
Review scores
Source	Rating
Allmusic	3/5 stars

Jukebox School of Music is the fifth album by folk guitarist Sandy Bull, released in 1988 through ROM Records. It was his first release in over fifteen years.

== Release and reception ==
Allmusic writer Jason Ankeny wrote: "A walking encyclopedia of musical instruments and styles, Bull illustrates the sheer breadth of his mastery on Jukebox School of Music." He gave the album three out of five stars, stating that despite being eclectic it is also exhausting overall. Critic Byron Coley of Spin described it as "a diary of Sandy's musical thoughts over the last decade", calling the acoustic tracks "humanly felt, deeply contemplative crystalline structures."

== Track listing ==
All music is composed by Sandy Bull, except Manhã de Carnaval by Luiz Bonfá.

No.	Title	Length
1.	"Moodswing Salsa"	3:29
2.	"Serious City"	3:45
3.	"A Way to Survive"	4:25
4.	"Fifth of Brandy" (Adapted from Bach's Fifth Brandenburg concertos)	4:11
5.	"Salsa d'Amore"	4:52
6.	"Don't Be Angry"	2:31
7.	"Continuum for Guitar"	7:53
8.	"Samba de Sandy"	3:27
9.	"For the Love of You"	4:04
10.	"Sanctified Steel"	3:40
11.	"Manhã de Carnaval"	6:56
12.	"High Five"	2:49
13.	"Truth"	8:26

== Personnel ==
- Sandy Bull – guitar
