= Mark Everist =

British music historian

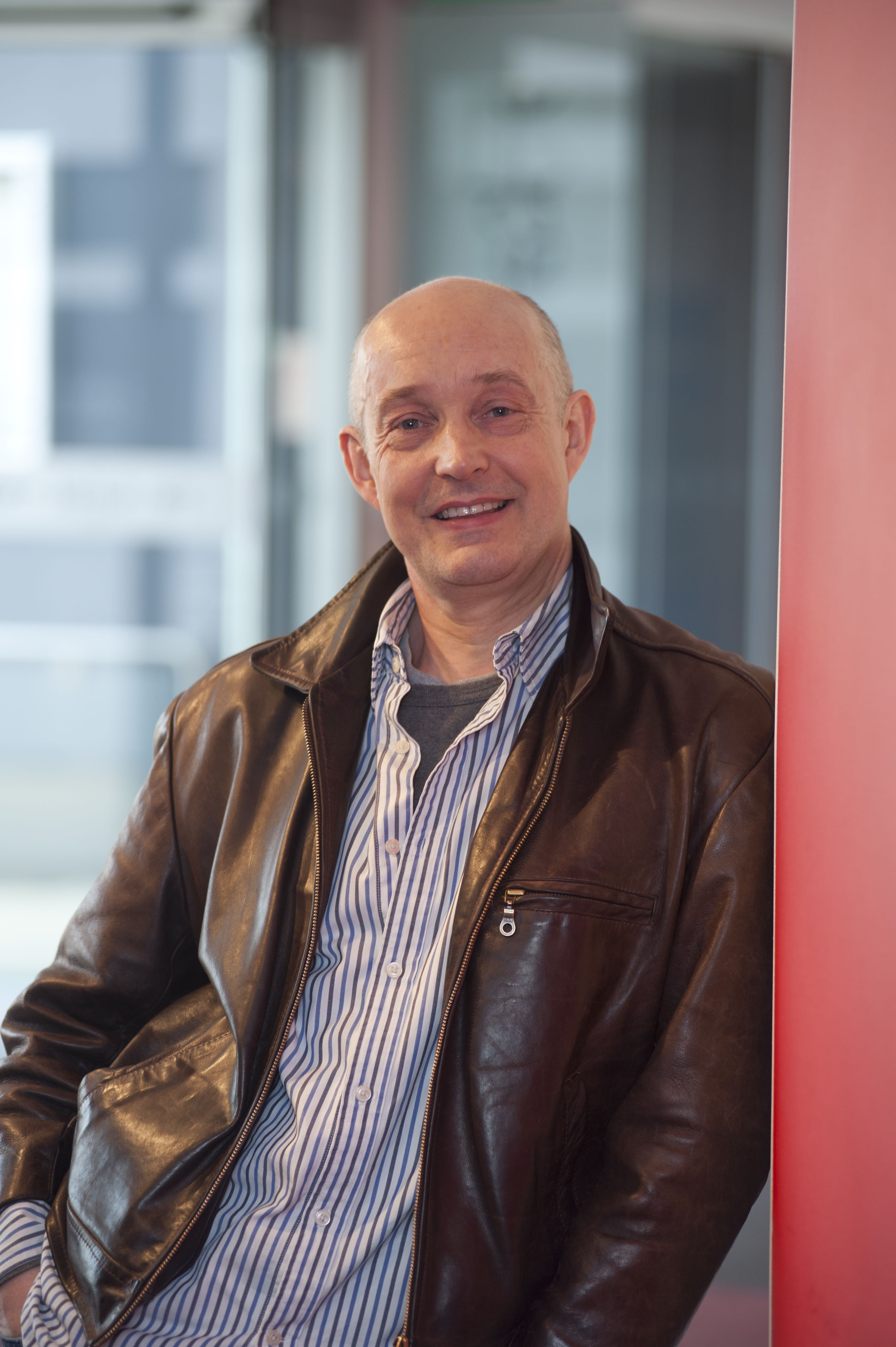
- Born: 27 December 1956 (age 69)

Mark Egerton Everist (born 27 December 1956) is a British music historian, critic, musicologist, and public intellectual.

== Early life and career ==
Born in London, Everist was educated at Clifton College (Bristol) and studied at Dartington College of Arts (BA 1979), King's College London (MMus 1980), and Keble College, Oxford (DPhil 1985).

After taking up his first post as lecturer, then reader, in musicology at King's College London in 1982, he accepted a position at the University of Southampton in 1996 and was promoted to professor. He has served as Head of Department (1997–2001 and 2005–2009) and Associate Dean (Research) for the Faculty of Arts and Humanities (2010–2014). For the 2014/15 academic year he was Professorial Fellow at the Institute of Musical Research, London. He has held visiting positions at the Paris Conservatoire, the University of Western Australia, the University of Melbourne, and Université Paris Sorbonne.

== Distinctions ==
Everist's publications have won the Westrup Prize of the Music & Letters trust, the Solie Prize of the American Musicological Society for the best collection of essays and the Slim Prize for the best article published in a refereed journal. He has been elected to the Academia Europaea and is a corresponding member of the American Musicological Society (only 22 UK scholars have received this distinction since the society's founding in 1937). He has been honoured by articles devoted to him in The New Grove Dictionary of Music and Musicians and in Die Musik in Geschichte und Gegenwart.

Everist was chair of the National Association of Music in Higher Education from 2005 until 2008, was elected President of the Royal Musical Association in 2011 and re-elected for a second term in 2014. In July 2024, he was named Chevalier de l’Ordre des Arts et des Lettres by the French Minister of Culture.

== Publications ==
Everist's publications focus on the Ars Antiqua, music drama in nineteenth-century France, and reception theory. Recent monographs are Opéra de Salon: Parisian Societies and Spaces in the Second Empire (New York: Oxford University Press, 2025); Genealogies of Music and Memory: Gluck in the 19th-Century Parisian Imagination (New York: Oxford University Press, 2021), described thus: "By taking into account all the uses and traces of a piece of music in order to understand a century, this volume establishes a method that could be applied to other composers at the crossroads of the eighteenth and nineteenth centuries, perhaps helping to rethink the classicism of the Romantics"; Discovering Medieval Song: Latin Poetry and Music in the Conductus (Cambridge: Cambridge University Press, 2018); Mozart's Ghosts: Haunting the Halls of Musical Culture (2012), investigates Mozart's reception in English, French, and German-speaking countries, and was reviewed as an "elegantly written, meticulously researched, anecdotally rich, intellectually and ethically subtle piece of scholarship". Earlier books examine the sources of polyphony and the motet in the thirteenth century, and French stage music in the nineteenth century. Everist has edited or co-edited nine volumes, as well as three volumes in the series Le magnus liber organi de Notre Dame de Paris published by Editions de l'Oiseau-Lyre between 2001 and 2003. His articles in refereed journals and chapters in collected works number nearly 100, and many of his articles have been translated into French, German, Japanese and Italian.

In his Arts and Humanities Research Council-funded project, Cantum pulcriorem invenire: Thirteenth-Century Latin Poetry and Music (CPI), Everist and a team of specialists at the University of Southampton investigated the medieval Conductus (2010–2016). The project produced three professional CDs of the repertory under examination and also supported four PhD dissertations and Everist's monograph entitled Discovering Medieval Song (Cambridge: Cambridge University Press, 2018). The project was described as follows: "The achievements of the CPI project will have long-lasting and transformational effects on the ways in which conducti are studied, analysed and performed". Other grant capture includes 14 awards from the British Academy and 13 from the Arts and Humanities Research Council.

He is also the co-director of the network "France: Musiques, Cultures, 1789–1918", and manages four digital resources (listed below).

=== Monographs ===
- French Thirteenth-Century Polyphony: Aspects of Sources and Distribution. New York and London: Garland, 1989.
- French Motets in the Thirteenth Century: Music, Poetry and Genre, Cambridge Studies in Medieval and Renaissance Music. Cambridge: Cambridge University Press, 1994. Paperback reprint 2004.
- Music Drama at the Paris Odéon, 1824–1828. Berkeley, Los Angeles and London: University of California Press, 2002.
- Giacomo Meyerbeer and Music Drama in Nineteenth-Century Paris. Variorum Collected Studies Series CS805. Aldershot: Ashgate, 2005.
- Mozart's Ghosts: Haunting the Halls of Musical Culture. New York: Oxford University Press, 2012.
- Discovering Medieval Song: Latin Poetry and Music in the Conductus. Cambridge: Cambridge University Press, 2018.
- Opera in Paris from the Empire to the Commune. London: Routledge, 2018.
- Genealogies of Music and Memory: Gluck in the 19th-Century Parisian Imagination. New York: Oxford University Press, 2021.
- The Empire at the Opéra: Theatre, Power and Music in Second Empire Paris, Cambridge Elements of Musical Theatre. Cambridge: Cambridge University Press, 2021.
- Opéra de Salon: Parisian Societies and Spaces in the Second Empire. New York: Oxford University Press, 2025.

=== Collections of essays ===
- Music Before 1600, Models of Musical Analysis 2. Oxford: Blackwell, 1992.
- Analytical Strategies and Musical Interpretation (co-edited with Craig Ayrey). Cambridge: Cambridge University Press, 1996.
- Rethinking Music (co-edited with Nicholas Cook). Oxford: Oxford University Press, 1999.
- Music, Theater and Cultural Transfer: Paris, 1830–1914 (co-edited with Annegret Fauser). Chicago: Chicago University Press, 2009.
- The Cambridge Companion to Medieval Music. Cambridge: Cambridge University Press, 2011.
- Meyerbeer and Grand Opéra: From the July Monarchy to the Present, Speculum musicae 28. Turnhout: Brepols, 2016.
- The Cambridge History of Medieval Music (co-edited with Thomas Forrest Kelly). Cambridge: Cambridge University Press, 2018.
- Perspectives on the French Musical Press in the Long Nineteenth Century. Special issue of Journal of Music Criticism 3 (2019).
- Genre and the Production of Gendered Identity on the Lyric Stage (co-edited with Jennifer Walker), Speculum musicae 55. Turnhout: Brepols, 2025.

=== Journal and other articles ===
Nearly 100 articles in various peer-reviewed journals, including:

- 19th-Century Music
- Cambridge Opera Journal
- Early Music
- Early Music History
- Journal of Musicology
- Journal of the American Musicological Society
- Journal of the Royal Musical Association
- Music Analysis
- Musica disciplina
- Music & Letters
- Plainsong and Medieval Music
- Revue belge de musicologie
- Revue de musicologie
- Royal Musical Association Research Chronicle
- 28 essays in various collections

=== Digital Resources ===
- Cantum pulcriorem invenire: Latin Poetry and Song, 1160-1330, 2012-.
- REFRAIN: Music, Poetry Citation: The Refrain in the Middle Ages / Musique, poésie, citation: le refrain au moyen âge, 2015-
- Music in the Second Empire Theatre (MitSET), 2019- http://www.fmc.ac.uk/mitset/index.html?#/ (PI)
- Opéra de salon: Paris Societies and Spaces, 1850-1870, The Musical Geography Project: Mapping Place and Movement Through Music History, 2024 -(https://musicalgeography.org/project/opera-de-salon/) (PI)
