= Sandy Bull & The Rhythm Ace Live 1976 =

Live album by Sandy Bull
- Released: March 27, 2012
- Recorded: May 2, 1976 at Berkeley Community Theatre, Berkeley, California
- Genre: Folk
- Length: 42:07
- Label: Drag City

Sandy Bull chronology
Vanguard Visionaries (2007)	Sandy Bull & The Rhythm Ace Live 1976 (2012)

Professional ratings
Review scores
Source	Rating
Pitchfork Media	(7.6/10)

Sandy Bull & The Rhythm Ace Live 1976 is a live album by folk guitarist Sandy Bull, released in 2012 through Drag City. It contains Bull's performance at the Berkeley Community Theatre on May 2, 1976. Many of the pieces performed were never recorded for his albums, making their debut appearance on this release.

== Track listing ==
All tracks are written by Sandy Bull.

Side one
No.	Title	Length
1.	"Oud"	7:48
2.	"Rhythm Ace Demo"	3:27
3.	"Love Is Forever"	5:28
4.	"Driftin'"	5:56

Side two
No.	Title	Length
1.	"Alligator Wrestler Intro"	2:46
2.	"Alligator Wrestler"	8:56
3.	"New York City"	7:56

== Personnel ==
- Sandy Bull – acoustic guitar, electric guitar, bass guitar, oud, steel guitar, vocals
- Eric Jacobs – mastering
- Hillel Resner – recording
- The Rhythm Ace – drum machine
- Lewis Watts – photography
- Baron Wolman – photography
