= Inventions (Sandy Bull album) =

Studio album by Sandy Bull
- Released: June 1965
- Recorded: 1964
- Genre: Folk
- Length: 54:44
- Label: Vanguard
- Producer: Sandy Bull

Sandy Bull chronology
Fantasias for Guitar and Banjo (1963)	Inventions (1965)	E Pluribus Unum (1969)

Professional ratings
Review scores
Source	Rating
Allmusic	4.5/5 stars

Inventions is the second studio album by the folk guitarist Sandy Bull. It was released in 1965 on Vanguard Records.

== Track listing ==
Side one
No.	Title	Writer(s)	Length
1.	"Blend II"	Bull	24:31
2.	"Gavotte No. 2" (Take 1)	Bach	2:05

Side two
No.	Title	Writer(s)	Length
1.	"Gavotte No. 2" (Take 2)	Bach	1:51
2.	"Manhã de Carnaval"	Bonfá	13:06
3.	"Triple Ballade"	de Machaut	3:15
4.	"Memphis, Tennessee"	Berry	9:53

== Personnel ==
- Sandy Bull – acoustic guitar, banjo, oud, bass guitar, electric guitar, production, engineering
- Billy Higgins – drums
- Richard Knapp – photography
- Don Schlitten – photography
