= Daphne Hellman =

American musician

- Born: Daphne van Beuren Bayne; 2 December, 1915; New York City
- Died: August 4, 2002 (aged 86); New York City
- Occupation: Harpist
- Spouses: Harry Bull (m. 1936; div. 1941); Geoffrey T. Hellman (m. 1941; div. 1960); Hsio Wen Shih (m. 1962)
- Children: 3, including Sandy Bull

Daphne Hellman (1915–2002), née van Beuren Bayne, was an American harpist known for her eclectic repertoire. She led a jazz trio that performed regularly at the Village Gate nightclub in New York City for 28 years, until the club closed in 1994.

== Family and early life ==
Hellman was born into a wealthy and socially prominent family in New York City in 1915. Her father Howard Bayne and grandfather Samuel Bayne were bankers and her mother was a sister of Frederick T. van Beuren Jr., a surgeon and administrator. From the age of seven she lived with her parents and older sister in Morristown, New Jersey, where she attended the Peck school. She later attended Miss Porter's School in Farmington, Connecticut and the Chapin School in New York and made her debut in society at a dance given by her parents at The Pierre in December 1933.

== Musical career ==
Hellman began playing the harp when she was 12 years old, studying with Mildred Dilling. During World War II she played in US Army Special Services shows in Washington, D.C., where her husband was stationed with the Office of Strategic Services. After the war Hellman began performing regularly in New York venues including Billy Rose's Diamond Horseshoe, Le Ruban Bleu, Upstairs at the Downstairs, and, as a member of Ving Merlin's All-Girl Band, at the Hotel New Yorker. In the 1950s she studied jazz with Phyllis Pinkerton, a piano student of Lennie Tristano.

In 1959 Harmony LP, a subsidiary of Columbia Records, released her album Holiday for Harp, on which Hellman led a jazz quartet with a "pleasing night club sound". In the 1960s she formed a jazz trio with bass player Jack Gregg and guitarist Edward Berg. In addition to jazz, their repertoire ranged from "the baroque of Bach, Scarlatti, Corelli and Couperin through the lush music of Tchaikovsky, Strauss and Debussy, to arrangements of contemporary composers such as the Beatles and Bobbie Gentry. Her regular trio, Hellman's Angels, had Lyn Christie on bass and Berg on guitar. They toured extensively, including India, Sri Lanka, Indonesia, Russia, and Hong Kong, and regularly played on Tuesday nights at the Village Gate nightclub for 28 years, until the club closed in 1994. She also played in the New York subways from the 1980s until shortly before her death in 2002.

== Personal life ==
She married Harry Bull in December 1936. Bull was the editor of Town & Country. In 1941 she divorced Bull and married Geoffrey T. Hellman, a writer for The New Yorker. In 1944, after a prolonged dispute in the courts, the New York Court of Appeals awarded custody of her son Sandy Bull to her ex-husband. Her daughter Daisy was born in 1946 and in 1951 she adopted a three year old Irish boy. Daphne and Geoffrey Hellman were divorced in 1960.

In January 1962 she married Hsio Wen Shih, the son of a diplomat who had been the Chinese ambassador to Brazil. Shih, a graduate of the Massachusetts Institute of Technology, was an architect and shared with Daphne Hellman a love of jazz. Her marriage to Shih resulted in her name being dropped from the Social Register. In 1965 Shih disappeared suddenly "like he went out for a pack of cigarettes and just didn't come back" and was never seen again.

Daphne Hellman died at the age of 86 on August 4, 2002 in New York City a few weeks after suffering a fall near her home on East 61st Street.
