= Vehicles (album) =

Studio album by Sandy Bull
- Released: 1992
- Genre: Folk
- Length: 51:09
- Label: Timeless Recording Society
- Producer: Sandy Bull

Sandy Bull chronology
Jukebox School of Music (1988)	Vehicles (1992)	Steel Tears (1996)

Professional ratings
Review scores
Source	Rating
Allmusic	3/5 stars

Vehicles is the sixth album by folk guitarist Sandy Bull, released in 1992 through Timeless Recording Society.

== Track listing ==
All tracks are written by Sandy Bull except as noted.

No.	Title	Writer(s)	Length
1.	"Ray's Dream"
2.	"Interstate Vehicle"
3.	"Nostalgia"
4.	"Drifting"
5.	"Walking to Missouri"
6.	"Louder Than Words"
7.	"Together Again"	Buck Owens
8.	"Rain Forest"
9.	"Alligator Wrestler"
10.	"Concerto for "The Wood""

== Personnel ==
- Sandy Bull – guitar
