= Early Music (journal) =

Academic journal on early music

- Discipline: Early music
- Language: English
- Edited by: Alan Howard; Elizabeth Eva Leach; Stephen Rose

Publication details
- History: 1973–present
- Publisher: Oxford University Press (UK)
- Frequency: Quarterly

Standard abbreviations
- ISO 4: Early Music

Indexing
- ISSN: 0306-1078 (print); 1741-7260 (web)
- LCCN: 2004-235659
- JSTOR: 03061078
- OCLC no.: 38949504

Links
- Journal homepage; Latest issue

Early Music is a peer-reviewed academic journal specialising in the study of early music. It was established in 1973 by John M. Thomson during the early music revival, and is published quarterly by Oxford University Press. The co-editors are Alan Howard, Elizabeth Eva Leach and Stephen Rose.

The journal has been described as "successfully disseminat[ing] valuable information to all members of the early music community: scholars, performers, informed amateurs, and instrument makers and collectors".

== Overview ==
Early Music broadly covers topics relating to its namesake period, namely the medieval, Renaissance and Baroque periods. Less often, topics from the Classical and Romantic periods are including as well. The journal publishes quarterly, featuring 5–10 articles, alongside reviews of books, music and recordings.

The librarian Alan Karass notes that the "articles are scholarly but not academic in nature". He further remarks that "a distinguishing feature of Early Music is its extraordinary visual beauty"; the journal frequently includes a variety of visual art to accompany its topics.

== History ==
Early Music was founded in 1973 by the New Zealand musicologist John Mansfield Thomson, who worked for many decades in London. He was a leading figure in the emerging early music revival, and aimed to aimed to unite early music scholarship with mainstream musical acts such as David Munrow. Published by Oxford University Press (OUP), Thomson worked alongside the OUP's Alan Franks, but characterized his relationship with the OUP as uneasy, he described control of the magazine by the music department as "spiritual death".

The journal has devoted issues to specific topics, such as the composers Guillaume de Machaut (5.4) and Johann Sebastian Bach (13.2), as well as Baroque theatre (both 17.4 and 18.1) and dance (26.2).

Thomson was the founding editor, followed by Nicholas Kenyon and Tess Knighton. The current co-editors are Alan Howard, Elizabeth Eva Leach and Stephen Rose.
