= The Peck School =

Coordinates: 40.78663°N 74.470181°W

Location
- 247 South Street; Morristown, New Jersey; United States

Information
- Type: Private, coed, day school
- Motto: Disciplina ad Vivendum – “Learning For Life”
- Established: 1893
- Headmaster: Andrew Delinsky
- Grades: Kindergarten through eighth grade
- Enrollment: 330
- Campus: 14 acres (57,000 m^{2})
- Colors: Blue and White
- Athletics: Field Hockey, Soccer, Cross Country, Volleyball, Hockey, Basketball, Baseball, Softball, and Lacrosse
- Mascot: The Pride
- Accreditation: Middle States Association of Colleges and Schools and the New Jersey Association of Independent Schools
- Yearbook: The Linden
- Mission Statement: The Peck School inspires students to learn rigorously, grow in character, and lead healthy, productive, and principled lives.
- Vision Statement: The Peck School sets the standard for excellence in K-8 education, where academic preparation and character development intersect powerfully in the learning experience. By embedding consideration of others, service, and belonging in all that we do, we are designing an integrated approach to education that develops curious and disciplined learners who positively shape the world.
- Student: Faculty ratio: 6:1
- Website: www.peckschool.org

The Peck School is an independent, co-educational day school with grades kindergarten through eighth grade. Peck School is located in Morristown, in Morris County, New Jersey. There are approximately 330 students. The Peck curriculum includes communication arts, drama, English, library studies, math, music, sports, reading, science, history, social studies, technology, themes or family life, visual arts, woodworking, and world languages.

The Peck School has two divisions, the Upper School (grades 5-8) and the Lower School (grades K-4).

Activities are held most Friday afternoons for Upper School students. Possible choices include The Linden (yearbook), the Student Council, Green Team, "Art Spirit" (literary magazine), the P.I.C club (Peck InDeCore Club), and more.

Further extracurricular activities include Kindergarten Helpers and the Peck Enrichment Program (PEP).

Like many independent schools, the Peck athletic program is required. It emphasizes sportsmanship, teamwork, and responsibility. Students compete inter-scholastically in grades 5-8 in a number of fall, winter, and spring sports. Peck has built up a reputation of having one of the most competitive private-school sports programs in the area. Peck's mascot is The Pride, which serves as a symbol of Peck's school-wide sense of pride.

The Peck School is a member of the New Jersey Association of Independent Schools and the Commission on Elementary Schools of the Middle States Association of Colleges and Schools.

Peck is also known for its many traditions. It has an annual field day called Downy-Redhead Day, which has relay races and an all-school tug-of-war. Downy-Redhead day is the final date of friendly competition between the Downy team and the Redhead team, named for woodpeckers native to the area. Students earn points for their team by earning "Job Well Done Tickets," which are acquired through acts of kindness, and active displays of the school's core values. Peck has a talent show, where students can showcase their talents to the school body. There is a Christmas Sing. There is also a Spring Sing. Lower schoolers participate in a science fair, which is known as the Science Expo, and they submit their work to the Lower School literary Arts magazine (Spectrum). Commencement is held every year for graduating eighth graders, as students move on to secondary school.

== History ==
The Peck School originally started in 1893 on Franklin Street, founded as Miss Sutphen's School for Young Ladies, with six initial students. Lorraine T. Peck purchased the school late in 1917. In 1920, the school moved to Elm Street, and then into its current location on South Street, in the Lindenwold Mansion and the surrounding acres.

In 1993, The Peck School completed the Deetjen Kindergarten Building. In 1995, the Caspersen-Tomlinson Academic Building was completed, followed by the F. M. Kirby Lower School in 1998. In 2006, the 35,000-square-foot (3,300 m^{2}) Eckhert Huff Building was completed, which was followed by the Athletic Center in 2007. The Peck Commons was completed in 2019 after the old gym in front of Lindenwold mansion was demolished to create a new quad for students.

Notable headmasters include Mr. Lorraine T. Peck (1917–1944), Mr. Philip S. Hesseltine (1946–1954), Mr. Rudy Deetjen (1977–1994), and Mr. John J. Kowalik (2003-2013). Andrew Delinsky, former Upper School Principal at Bullis School in Potomac, Maryland, has been serving as head of the school since 2014.

== Notable alumni ==
- Bromberg Brothers, owners of the Blue Ribbon food chain
- Ken Demarest, a computer game programmer, artist, and business person
- Rodney Frelinghuysen, a US congressman
- Daphne Hellman, who was a harpist known for her eclectic repertoire
- Dorothy May Kinnicutt, an American interior decorator and socialite who decorated the Kennedy White House
- Jill Krementz, author of several titles and spouse to Kurt Vonnegut
- Robert Tappan Morris
- Alexis Maybank, author of By Invitation Only and founder of Gilt Groupe
- Paul W. Downs, an actor, writer, director, and producer
- F. D. Reeve, father of actor Christopher Reeve
- Alfred Whitney Griswold, president of Yale from 1950-1963
- John Farinacci, a professional hockey player

== Sports ==
The Peck School students compete on interscholastic sports teams from grades 5-8. In lower school grades, students learn fundamental motor skills, sports technique, teamwork, and sportsmanship.

Peck sports include for girls and boys basketball, volleyball, field hockey, co-ed ice hockey, co-ed cross country, boys and girls lacrosse, softball, baseball wrestling and for boys soccer.

Peck also partakes in CML (Continental Math League), and recently 7th graders Roshan Prasad and Collin Garvey received first place honors. They also compete in NJML (New Jersey Math League), where Declan Garvey and Harley Zhang got first place in 7th and 8th grade respectively.
