= Schelmish =

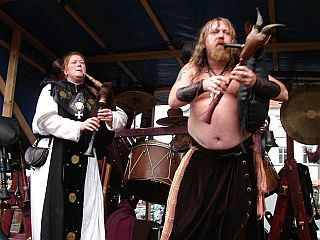
- Schelmish performing in Denmark in 2002

Background information
- Origin: Bonn, Germany
- Genres: Mittelalter rock
- Years active: 1999 - 2012
- Members: Dextro; Des Demonia; Rimsbold von Tiefentann; Luzi das L Marquis de Guis; Samtron; Picus von Corvin; Daniel San; Der Hai
- Past members: Igerne (until 2001); Buchanan (until 2001); Bajonne (until 2002); Norbius (until 2002); Baccata (left in 2003); Johannes der Säufer (2006–2007); Sakepharus der Schmierenkomödiant (2002–2007); Naj O, der Reine (2006); Amsel von Nydeggen (2002–2004); Balitur (2001–2002); Septimus (2002); Dschieses von Haagesteyff (2007–2008); Sideribus illustris (2007–2008); Fragor der Schlagfertige (2001–2008); Alexis de la Vega
- Website: http://www.schelmish.de/

Schelmish was a German Mittelalter rock band from the city of Bonn. The band originally formed in 1999 for a birthday celebration for band member Des Demonia's mother. The language of their songs varies between German, English, Latin, French and several old languages. The band split-up in December 2012; a group of member founded the electro folk rock band InVictus.

== History ==
The inspiration for forming of Schelmish was the birthday of Des Demonia's mother in 1999. Musically, Schelmish is rooted in Irish folk. Today though they are rather oriented towards Mittelalter Rock.

Their first CD Von Räubern, Lumpen und anderen Schelmen (Of Robbers, Rascals and other Scoundrels) was released in 2000. It features the original line-up of Schelmish and contains traditional medieval songs.

The second CD Aequinoctium is also composed only of medieval songs. It was released in 2001. For the recordings, Balitur joined the band while Igerne and Buchanan departed.

On Codex Lascivus, the third CD, released in 2002, the band's first original pieces can be heard. For this effort Amsel von Nydeggen (of Filia Irata), Fragor der Schlagfertige, Sakepharus der Schmierenkomödiant and Septimus joined the band, while, Morbius, Balitur and Bajonne left. This CD includes the instrumental Rotta, which since its release has traditionally been played at each of their concerts.

Except for the absence of Septimus, the line-up for the fourth album Tempus mutatur is the same as on Codex Lascivus. Here they recorded for the first time a bonus track with electric guitars and bass. Michael Rhein of In Extremo appears as a guest singer for Veris Dulcis and Le pôvre Villon. It was released in 2003.

After their four studio albums Schelmish produced a maxi single of Si salvas me containing three versions of Si salvas me, the hymn of Satzvey castle in Mechernich, plus another track. This maxi from 2003 is a preview of the subsequent studio album Igni Gena, which also features Si salvas me. Since this recording, Luzi das L has been a member of Schelmish, while Baccata left for health reasons.

With the fifth CD Igni Gena of 2004 the band makes it obvious that their beat has been remarkably stepped as compared to their previous albums. Moreover there is a track Ich was ein Chint so wolgetan from Carmina Burana with slight influences from hip hop/rap. Again Michael Rhein of In Extremo appears as a guest singer. It also contains a medieval version of Johnny Cash's Ring of Fire with medieval instrumentation and vocals by Dextro.

In 2005 Schelmish fulfilled their fans' wish for a live album and released a CD called Schelmish - Live. It contains the full live recording from the 29 January 2005 show at the Kulturfabrik Krefeld. Die Rote Füchsin (Red Vixen) of Filia Irata appears as guest musician while Amsel von Nydeggen is no longer part of the band.

Two months later their first DVD Coetus was released. Among excerpts from the show at the Kulturfabrik Krefeld it contains material of several other shows (e.g. together with Das letzte Einhorn and Flex der Biegsame of In Extremo), two videos as a preview of the following album Mente Capti as well as numerous interviews, CD previews, photos, Easter eggs and also a film about Schelmish. Moreover the DVD was seen as a farewell project for Amsel von Nydeggen. She can be seen in older show recordings and in the film. Also Die Rote Füchsin of Filia Irata is featured on this DVD.

Mente Capti is the sixth studio album, which was released in July 2006. For the first time since Codex Lascivus the band has eight members because guitarist Marquis de Guis and den bassist Naj O, der Reine, (later replaced by Johannes, der Säufer) filled the ranks. While the band's previous albums were almost exclusively recorded with medieval instruments Mente Capti focused on a rock instrumentation, i.e. electric guitars and bass and a modern drum set. This way Schlemish re-interpreted old songs but also wrote new pieces that deal with love, melancholy and joy. The vocals were mainly Rimsbold's task while Dextro and Fragor concentrated on string instruments. Luzi and Des Demonia focused on wind instruments and Sakepharus on percussion.

In early 2007 Sakepharus left the band to concentrate on his family. His leaving had been announced beforehand and at the same time Dschieses and Picus were accepted as new members. Also Johannes der Säufer left the band on 30 July 2007 and was replaced on the bass by Sideribus illustris.

On 19 October 2007 the seventh album Wir werden sehen (We Shall See) was released and a tour was begun. Already in September Moor had been released as a single containing two album tracks and two additional recordings. In early 2008 Dschieses and Sideribus left the band for reasons of personal timing. Their successors are Samtron on the drums and Alexis de la Vega on the bass. After a period of almost seven years Fragor now left the ensemble in April 2008. After having been present on medieval shows only in 2007 and not on rock shows he then returned to private life.

On 28 October 2009 the ninth album Die hässlichen Kinder (The Ugly Children) was released in Finland and Spain through Napalm Records. It was released in the United States and Canada on November 3 of the same year.

== Discography ==
=== Albums ===
- 2000: Von Räubern, Lumpen und anderen Schelmen
- 2001: Aequinoctium
- 2002: Codex Lascivus
- 2003: Tempus Mutatur
- 2004: Igni Gena
- 2005: Schelmish Live (Live-CD)
- 2006: Mente Capti
- 2007: Wir werden sehen
- 2009: Die hässlichen Kinder
- 2010: Persona non Grata

=== Maxi singles ===
- 2003: "Si salvas me" (Hymn of the castle Satzvey)
- 2007: "Moor"

=== DVDs ===
- 2005: Coetus
