= Suzannah Clark =

Canadian-British musicologist and music theorist (born 1969)

Suzannah Clark (born February 3, 1969) is a Canadian-British musicologist and music theorist specializing in the music of Franz Schubert, the history of music theory, and medieval music. She is currently Morton B. Knafel Professor of Music and Director of the Mahindra Humanities Center at Harvard University. In 2019 she was named Harvard College Professor, and served from 2016 to 2019 as chair of Harvard's Department of Music.

== Biography and research ==
Clark grew up in Newfoundland, Canada, and England. Educated at King's College London, Princeton University, and the Humboldt University Berlin, she took up a Junior Research Fellowship, and then a British Academy Research Fellowship at Merton College, Oxford. Between 2000 and 2008 she taught at the Faculty of Music at the University of Oxford. In 2008 she moved to Harvard University, where she had first taught as a visiting professor the previous year.

Clark’s main research has focused on Schubert analysis. Originally beginning with an analysis of the harmonically symmetrical properties of his instrumental forms, Clark’s study soon encompassed the forms of Schubert’s songs as well. Her interest in the properties of diatonicism and tonal spaces has also fed much of her work in the history of music theory, notably in her studies of Arthur von Oettingen and Heinrich Schenker. Clark’s work on medieval music originally focused on the music of the thirteenth century, the trouvères, the genre of refrains, but now centers broadly on questions of textuality, performance, and musical analysis.

Clark serves on the advisory boards of Music Analysis and Nineteenth-Century Music Review, and she was an associate director of the Digital Image Archive of Medieval Music (DIAMM). She was Reviews Editor for the Journal of the American Musicological Society.

== Select publications ==
- Citation and Authority in Medieval and Early Renaissance Musical Culture: Learning from the Learned (co-edited with Elizabeth Eva Leach, London: Boydell, 2005)
- Music Theory and Natural Order from the Renaissance to the Early Twentieth Century (co-edited with Alexander Rehding, Cambridge: Cambridge University Press, 2001, pbk 2005)
- “Schenker’s Mysterious Five” Nineteenth Century Music (1999)
- “Schubert, Theory, and Analysis” Music Analysis (2001)
- “The politics of the Urlinie in Schenker’s Der Tonwille and Der freie Satz“ Journal of the RMA (2007)
- “‘S’en dirai chançonete’: hearing text and music in a medieval motet" Plainsong and Medieval Music (2007)
- Analyzing Schubert Cambridge University Press (2011)
