= List of compositions by Guillaume de Machaut =

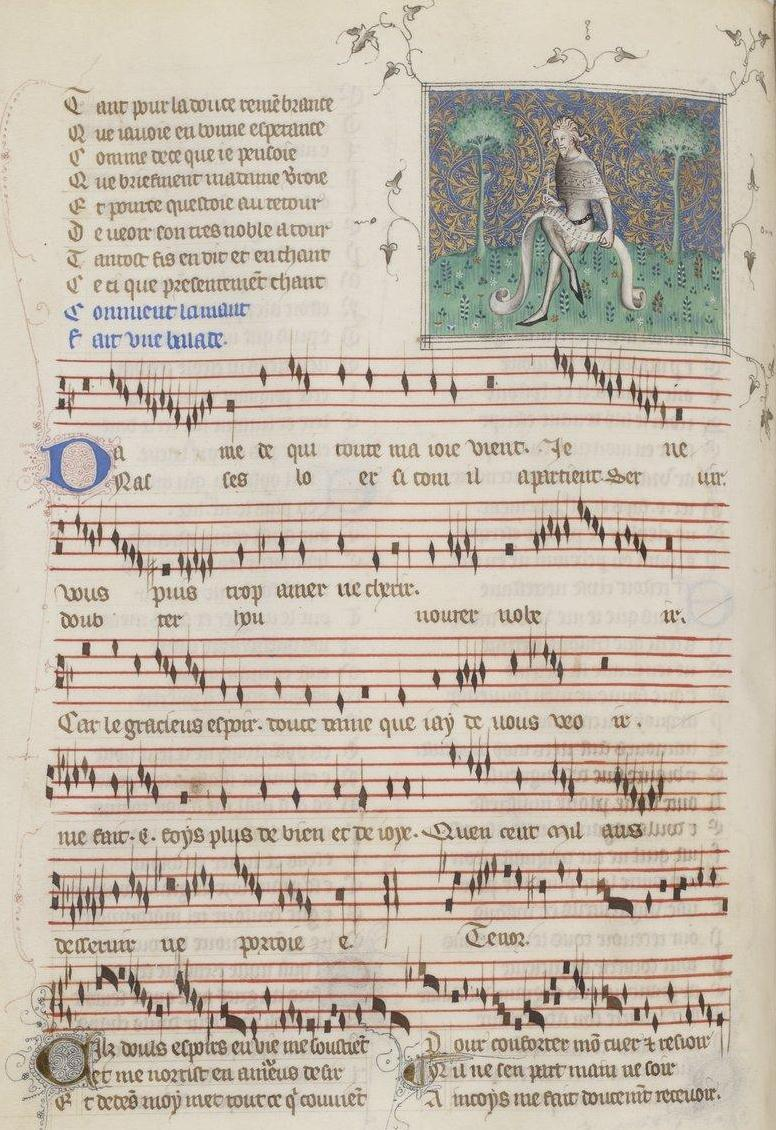
Dame, de qui toute ma joie (B42 or RF5), before 1342, from Le Remède de Fortune

The French composer Guillaume de Machaut was the most prolific composer of his time, with surviving works encompassing many forms, the three formes fixes rondeaux, virelais, ballades, as well as motets, lais and a single representative of the complainte, chanson royale, double hocket and mass genres. Most of his extant output is secular music, a notable exception being the renowned Messe de Nostre Dame. His oeuvre as a whole represents an unprecedented volume of surviving music for a single medieval composer, largely in part due to his own efforts to preserve and curate manuscripts for his music. The dominant figure of the ars nova style in late medieval music, Machaut is regarded as the most significant French composer and poet of the 14th century and often seen as the century's leading European composer.

Since many titles are merely the first lines of the texts used, in different sources individual pieces may be referred to by slightly different titles. For example, R20 is known both as Douce dame and Douce dame tant qui vivray. Furthermore, some of Machaut's works (most notably the motets) employ simultaneous performance of several different texts. In such cases, the title of the work lists all texts used, starting from the top voice.

Machaut was the first composer to concentrate on self-anthologization of his works, supervising the creation of three complete-works manuscripts during his life. In the last manuscript, written c. 1370, the scribe wrote Vesci l'ordinance que G. de Machau wet qu'il ait en son livre—Here is the order that G. de Machaut wants his book to have.

Works are organized by genre. The numbering scheme, from the classic edition of Machaut's works by Leo Schrade, does not represent chronology, since few of Machaut's works can be reliably dated.

== Ballades ==
- B1 S'Amours ne fait
- B2 Helas! tant ay dolour
- B3 On ne porroit penser
- B4 Biaute qui toutes autres pere
- B5 Riches d'amour et mendians
- B6 Doulz amis
- B7 J'aim mieus languir
- B8 De desconfort
- B9 Dame, ne regardes pas
- B10 Ne penses pas
- B11 N'en fait n'en dit
- B12 Pour ce que tous mes chans
- B13 Esperance qui m'asseure
- B14 Je ne cuit pas
- B15 Se je me pleing
- B16 Dame, comment qu'amez
- B17 Sanz cuer m'en vois / Amis, dolens/ Dame, par vous
- B18 De petit po
- B19 Amours me fait desirer
- B20 Je sui aussi com cilz
- B21 Se quanque amours
- B22 Il m'est avis
- B23 De Fortune me doy pleindre
- B24 Tres douce dame
- B25 Honte, paour, doubtance
- B26 Donnez, signeurs
- B27 Une vipere en cuer
- B28 Je puis trop bien
- B29 De triste cuer / Quant vrais amans / Certes, je di
- B30 Pas de tor
- B31 De toutes flours
- B32 Ploures, dames
- B33 Nes que on porroit
- B34 Quant Theseus / Ne quier veoir
- B35 Gais et jolis
- B36 Se pour ce muir
- B37 Dame, se vous m'estes
- B38 Phyton, le mervilleus serpent
- B39 Mes esperis
- B40 Ma chiere dame
- B41 En amer a douce vie from Le Remède de Fortune (before 1342)
- B42 Dame, de qui toute ma joie from Le Remède de Fortune (before 1342)

== Complainte ==
- Tels rit au main from Le Remède de Fortune (before 1342)

== Chanson royale ==
- Joie, plaisence from Le Remède de Fortune (before 1342)

== Double hocket ==
- David Hoquetus (1360s)

== Lais ==
- L1 Loyaute, que point ne delay
- L2 J'aim la flour de valour
- L3 Pour ce qu'on puist
- L4 Nuls ne doit avoir
- L5 Par trois raisons
- L6 Amours doucement
- L7 Le lay des dames: Amis t'amour
- L8 Le lay mortel: Un mortel lay weil commencier
- L9 Le lay de l'ymage: Ne say comment commencier
- L10 Le lay de Nostre Dame: Contre ce doulz mois de may
- L11 Le lay de la fonteinne: Je ne cesse de prier
- L12 Le lay de confort: S'onques doulereusement
- L13 Le lay de bonne esperance: Longuement me sui
- L14 Le lay de plour: Malgre fortune
- L15 Le lay de la rose: Pour vivre joliement
- L16 Le lay de plour: Qui bien aimme
- L17 Un lay de consolation: Pour ce que plus proprement
- L18 En demantant
- L19 Qui n'aroit autre deport from Le Remède de Fortune (before 1342)

== Mass ==
- Messe de Nostre Dame (1360s)
  - Kyrie
  - Gloria
  - Credo
  - Sanctus
  - Agnus Dei
  - Ite missa est

== Motets ==
- M1 Quant en moy / Amour et biauté / Amara valde
- M2 De souspirant / Tous corps qui de bien amer / Suspiro
- M3 Fine Amour / He! Mors com tu es haie / Quare non sum mortuus
- M4 Puisque la douce rousee / De Bon Espoir / Speravi
- M5 Qui plus aimme / Aucune gent m'ont demandé / Fiat voluntas tua
- M6 S'Amours tous amans joir / S'il estoit nulz qui pleindre / Et gaudebit cor vestrum
- M7 Lasse! je sui en aventure / J'ay tant mon cuer / Ego moriar pro te
- M8 Ha! Fortune / Qui es promesses de Fortune / Et non est qui adjuvet
- M9 O livoris feritas / Fons totuis superbie / Fera pessima
- M10 Helas! ou sera pris confors / Hareu! hareu! le feu / Obediens usque ad mortem
- M11 Fins cuers doulz / Dame, je sui cilz / Fins cuers doulz
- M12 Corde mesto cantando / Helas! pour quoy virent / Libera me
- M13 Eins que ma dame / Tant doucement m'ont attrait / Ruina
- M14 De ma dolour / Maugre mon cuer / Quia amore langueo
- M15 Faus Samblant m'a deceu / Amours qui ha le pouoir / Vidi Dominum
- M16 Se j'aim mon loyal ami / Lasse! comment oublieray / Pour quoy me bat mes maris?
- M17 O series summe rata / Quant vraie amour enflamee / Super omnes speciosa
- M18 Bone pastor, qui pastores / Bone pastor, Guillerme / Bone pastor (c. 1324)
- M19 Diligenter inquiramus / Martyrum gemma latria / A Christo honoratus
- M20 Biaute paree de valour / Trop plus est belle / Je ne sui mie certeins
- M21 Veni creator spiritus / Christe, quie lux es / Tribulatio proxima est et non est qui adjuvet (c. 1358–60 or later)
- M22 Plange, regni respublica / Tu qui gregem tuum ducis / Apprehende arma et scutum et exurge (c. 1358–60 or later)
- M23 Inviolata genitrix / Felix virgo / Ad te suspiramus gementes et flentes (c. 1358–60 or later)
- M24 De touz les biens / Li enseignement / Ecce tu pulchra es amica mea (doubtful)

== Rondeaux ==
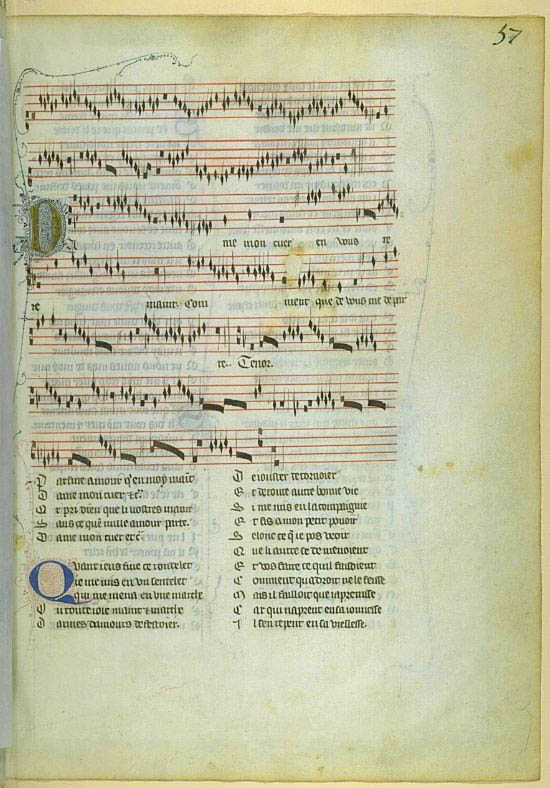
Dame, mon cuer en vous remaint, Rondeau 22

- R1 Doulz viaire gracieus
- R2 Helas! pour quoy
- R3 Merci vous pri
- R4 Sans cuer, dolens
- R5 Quant j'ay l'espart
- R6 Cinc, un, treze
- R7 Se vous n'estes
- R8 Vos doulz resgars
- R9 Tant doucement
- R10 Rose, liz, printemps
- R11 Comment puet on mieus
- R12 Ce qui soustient
- R13 Dame, se vous n'aves aperceu
- R14 Ma fin est mon commencement
- R15 Certes, mon oueil
- R16 Dame, qui weult
- R17 Dix et sept, cinc, trese
- R18 Puis qu'en oubli
- R19 Quant ma dame les maus
- R20 Douce dame tant qui vivray
- R21 Quant je ne voy
- R22 Dame, mon cuer from Le Remède de Fortune (before 1342)

== Virelais ==
- V1 He! dame de vaillance
- V2 Layaute weil tous jours
- V3 Ay mi! dame de valour
- V4 Douce dame jolie
- V5 Comment qu'a moy
- V6 Se ma dame
- V7 Puis que ma dolour
- V8 Dou mal qui m'a longuement
- V9 Dame, je weil endurer
- V10 De bonte, de valour
- V11 He! dame de valour
- V12 Dame, a qui m'ottri
- V13 Quant je sui mis
- V14 J'aim sans penser
- V15 Se mesdisans
- V16 C'est force, faire le weil
- V17 Dame, vostre doulz viaire
- V18 Helas! et comment
- V19 Dieus, Biaute, Douceur
- V20 Se d'amer
- V21 Je vivroie liement
- V22 Foy porter
- V23 Tres bonne et belle
- V24 En mon cuer
- V25 Tuit mi penser
- V26 Mors sui, se je ne vous voy
- V27 Liement me deport
- V28 Plus dure que un dyamant
- V29 Dame, mon cuer emportes
- V30 Se je souspir
- V31 Moult sui de bonne heure nee
- V32 De tout sui si confortee
- V33 Dame, a vous sans retollier from Le Remède de Fortune (before 1342)

== Alternate cataloging ==
The works from Le Remède de Fortune have presented a problem for modern-day collections, as they appeared in the manuscript in the poem, not with other works of its genre. Thus, occasionally Le Remède de Fortune works are given their own category and catalogued according to the order of their appearance:

- RF1 Qui n'aroit autre deport (Lai)
- RF2 Tels rit au main (Complainte)
- RF3 Joie, plaisence (Chanson Royale)
- RF4 En amer a douce vie (Balladele)
- RF5 Dame, de qui toute ma joie (Ballade)
- RF6 Dame, a vous sans retoller (Chanson Baladée)
- RF7 Dame, mon cuer (Rondeau)

== Sources ==
Books and chapters

- Leach, Elizabeth Eva (2011). "The Fourteenth Century". In Everist, Mark (ed.). The Cambridge Companion to Medieval Music. Cambridge: Cambridge University Press. ISBN 978-0-19-316303-4.
- Leach, Elizabeth Eva (2014). Guillaume de Machaut: Secretary, Poet, Musician. Ithaca, New York: Cornell University Press. ISBN 978-1-5017-0486-4.

Journal and encyclopedia articles

- Arlt, Wulf [in German] (2001). "Machaut [Machau, Machault], Guillaume de". Grove Music Online. Oxford, England: Oxford University Press. doi:10.1093/gmo/9781561592630.article.51865. ISBN 9781561592630. (subscription, Wikilibrary access, or UK public library membership required)
- Clark, Alice V. (2012). "Guillaume de Machaut". Oxford Bibliographies: Medieval Studies. Oxford: Oxford University Press. doi:10.1093/OBO/9780195396584-0049. (subscription required)
- Earp, Lawrence (1989). "Machaut's Role in the Production of Manuscripts of His Works". Journal of the American Musicological Society. 42 (3): 461–503. doi:10.2307/831503. JSTOR 831503.
- Earp, Lawrence (2011). "Guillaume de Machaut". Oxford Bibliographies: Music. Oxford: Oxford University Press. doi:10.1093/OBO/9780199757824-0030. (subscription required)

Online

- "The Works of Guillaume de Machaut". La Trobe University Library. 2 June 2003.
- "Author: Guillaume de Machaut (c1300-1377)". The Lied and Art Song Texts Page.
