= Sandy Bull =

American singer-songwriter

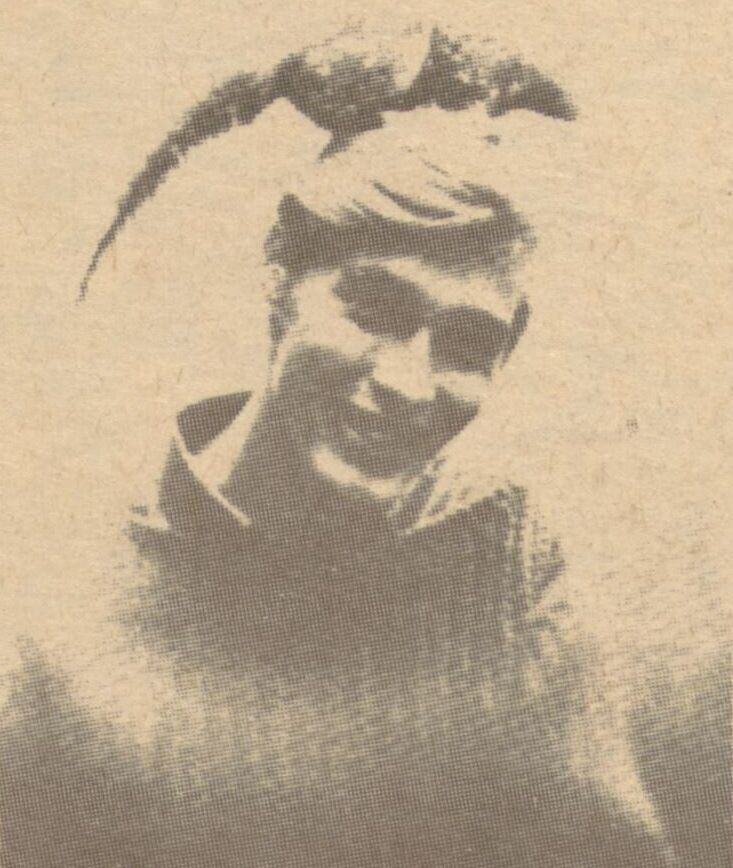
- Sandy Bull, 1968

Background information
- Born: Alexander Bull; 25 February 1941; New York City, New York, U.S.
- Died: 11 April 2001 (aged 60) Franklin, Tennessee, U.S.
- Genres: Folk rock, psychedelic folk
- Occupations: Musician, songwriter
- Instruments: Guitars, oud, banjo, bass guitar, mandolin
- Years active: Late 1950s – 2001
- Label: Vanguard

Alexander "Sandy" Bull (February 25, 1941 – April 11, 2001) was an American folk musician and composer. Bull was an accomplished player of many stringed instruments, including guitar, pedal steel guitar, banjo, and oud. His early work blends non-western instruments with 1960s folk revival, and has been cited as important in the development of psychedelic music.

== Early life and education ==
Born February 25, 1941, in New York City, Alexander "Sandy" Bull was the only child of Harry A. Bull, an editor in chief of Town & Country magazine, and Daphne van Beuren Bayne (1916–2002), a New Jersey banking heiress who became known as a jazz harpist under the name Daphne Hellman. His parents were divorced in 1941, shortly after his birth. By his mother's second marriage to The New Yorker writer Geoffrey T. Hellman, Bull had a half-sister, the sitar player Daisy Hellman Paradis, and an adopted half-brother, Digger St. John.

In the 1950s he studied music at Boston University and performed at nightclubs both in Boston and Cambridge. By the early 1960s he was performing in folk clubs in Greenwich Village, New York City. He moved to San Francisco in 1963 and shared an apartment with musician, Hamza El Din.

== Music ==
His albums often presented an eclectic repertoire including extended modal improvisations on oud. An arrangement of Carl Orff's composition Carmina Burana for 5-string banjo appears on his first album and other musical fusions include his adaptation of Luiz Bonfá's "Manhã de Carnaval", a lengthy variation on "Memphis, Tennessee" by Chuck Berry, and compositions derived from works of J. S. Bach and Roebuck Staples.

Bull used overdubbing as a way to accompany himself. As documented in the Still Valentine's Day, 1969: Live At the Matrix, San Francisco recording, Sandy Bull's use of tape accompaniment was part of his solo performances in concert as well.

Bull primarily played a finger-picking style of guitar and banjo and his style has been compared to that of John Fahey and Robbie Basho of the early Takoma label in the 1960s. Guitarist Guthrie Thomas credits Bull as being a major influence in his early playing career.

By the 1970s he had relocated to San Francisco, where he shared living and rehearsal space with folk singer Billy Roberts, the composer of the Jimi Hendrix song, "Hey Joe". On May 2, 1976 he opened a concert by Leo Kottke at the Berkeley Community Theater, where he performed using his 4-track recorder and a 'Rhythm Ace' as backup instruments.

Bull later moved to Los Angeles, Florida and then Nashville, where he built a recording studio. He became close to many prominent Nashville musicians and in the 1990s recorded several records on the Timeless Recording Society label. He also played the oud on Sam Phillips' 1991 album, Cruel Inventions.

== Personal life ==
Sandy Bull struggled with a drug problem between the late 1960s until 1974, which seriously affected his performing. After completing a rehabilitation program in 1974, he began performing again.

He was married to Candy and they had three children. On April 11, 2001, Bull died of lung cancer at his home in Franklin near Nashville, Tennessee.

His daughter, KC Bull, created a film about her father, No Deposit, No Return Blues (2009).

== Discography ==
Studio albums

- Fantasias for Guitar and Banjo (1963, Vanguard)
- Inventions (1965, Vanguard)
- E Pluribus Unum (1969, Vanguard)
- Demolition Derby (1972, Vanguard)
- Jukebox School of Music (1988, ROM)
- Vehicles (Timeless Recording Society, 1991)
- Steel Tears (Timeless Recording Society, 1996)

Live albums

- Still Valentine's Day 1969 (2006, Water)
- Sandy Bull & The Rhythm Ace Live 1976 (2012, Drag City)

Compilations

- The Essential Sandy Bull (1974, Vanguard)
- Re-Inventions: Best of the Vanguard Years (1999, Vanguard)
- Vanguard Visionaries (2007, Vanguard)
