= Still Valentine's Day 1969 =

Live album by Sandy Bull
- Released: July 18, 2006
- Recorded: February 14th & April 5th, 1969 at The Matrix, San Francisco, California
- Genre: Folk
- Length: 59:21
- Label: Water
- Producer: Sandy Bull

Sandy Bull chronology
Re-Inventions: Best of the Vanguard Years (1999)	Still Valentine's Day 1969 (2006)	Vanguard Visionaries (2007)

Professional ratings
Review scores
Source	Rating
Allmusic	3.5/5 stars
Mojo	3/5 stars

Still Valentine's Day 1969 is a live album by American folk guitarist Sandy Bull, released in 2006 through Water Records.

== Track listing ==
All music is composed by Sandy Bull, except where noted.

No.	Title	Writer(s)	Length
1.	"Introduction"		0:33
2.	"Bouree"		3:20
3.	"No Deposit, No Return Blues"		8:47
4.	"Manhã de Carnaval"	Bonfá	9:53
5.	"Improvisation for Oud 1"		3:46
6.	"Electric Blend 1"		12:17
7.	"Improvisation for Oud 2"		5:49
8.	"Memphis, Tennessee"	Berry	5:32
9.	"Electric Blend 2"		9:24

== Personnel ==
- Matthew Azevedo – mastering
- KC Bull – production
- Sandy Bull – acoustic guitar, electric guitar, oud
- Glenn Jones – mastering
- Nathaniel Russell – art direction
- Filippo Salvadori – executive production
- Pat Thomas – production
- Lewis Watts – photography
- Baron Wolman – photography
