= Demolition Derby (album) =

Studio album by Sandy Bull
- Released: 1972
- Genre: Folk
- Length: 38:05
- Label: Vanguard
- Producer: Sandy Bull

Sandy Bull chronology
E Pluribus Unum (1969)	Demolition Derby (1972)	Jukebox School of Music (1988)

Professional ratings
Review scores
Source	Rating
Allmusic	3/5 stars

Demolition Derby is the fourth album by folk guitarist Sandy Bull, released in 1972 through Vanguard Records. Songwriter Patti Smith, who was a known admirer of Bull's work, said "Even at its most 'cosmic,' Demolition Derby is still sleazy... juicy... American. Yeah it's a real cool record."

== Accolades ==
Year	Publication	Country	Accolade	Rank
2010	Uncut	United Kingdom	"The 50 Greatest Lost Albums"	46
"*" denotes an unordered list.

== Track listing ==
Side one
No.	Title	Writer(s)	Length
1.	"Gotta Be Juicy"	Bull	5:08
2.	"Carnival Jump"	Bull	9:00
3.	"Tennessee Waltz"	King, Stewart	3:10
4.	"Sweet Baby Jumper"	Bull	2:51

Side two
No.	Title	Writer(s)	Length
1.	"Last Date"	Cramer	2:35
2.	"Easy Does It"	Bull	9:19
3.	"Coming Together"	Bull	5:58
4.	"Cheeseburger"	Bull	0:02

== Personnel ==
- Sandy Bull – guitar, banjo, oud, vocals, production, mixing
- Denis Charles – tabla on "Carnival Jump" and "Easy Does It"
- Jeff Zaraya – engineering
