= E Pluribus Unum (album) =

Studio album by Sandy Bull
- Released: 1969
- Recorded: 1968
- Genre: Folk
- Length: 38:47
- Label: Vanguard
- Producer: Maynard Solomon

Sandy Bull chronology
Inventions (1965)	E Pluribus Unum (1969)	Demolition Derby (1972)

Professional ratings
Review scores
Source	Rating
Allmusic	3/5 stars

E Pluribus Unum is the third album by folk guitarist Sandy Bull, released in 1969 through Vanguard Records.

== Track listing ==
All music is composed by Sandy Bull.

Side one
No.	Title	Length
1.	"No Deposit-No Return Blues"	17:03

Side two
No.	Title	Length
1.	"Electric Blend"	21:44

== Personnel ==
- Joel Brodsky – photography
- Sandy Bull – guitar, bass guitar, oud, percussion, tambourine, cowbell
- Gary Cox – photography
- Fred Holtz – design
- Maynard Solomon – production

== See also ==
- E pluribus unum, de facto United States national motto until 1956
