= Royal Musical Association =

The Royal Musical Association (RMA) is a British scholarly society and charity. Founded in 1874, the Association claims to be the second oldest musicological society in the world, after that of the Netherlands. Activities include organizing and sponsoring academic conferences in the United Kingdom, and making awards for outstanding scholarship, notably the annual Dent Medal.

== History ==
The society was founded by Sir John Stainer and was originally titled the Musical Association with a subtitle 'the investigation and discussion of subjects connected with the Art and Science of Music'. Sir Frederick Ouseley, Stainer's teacher, was the first president. Francis William Davenport was honorary secretary between 1883 and 1889. The Association was registered as a company in 1904 and as a charity in 1965. The Association was renamed the Royal Musical Association in 1944 following the orders of King George VI.

== Publications ==
The Association publishes the Journal of the Royal Musical Association. Before 1987, the Journal was known as the Proceedings of the Royal Musical Association (often abbreviated PMRA; ISSN 0080-4452 and 1471-6933), and before 1945 as the Proceedings of the Musical Association (see OCLC 630055862 for print holdings from 1878 to 1986). The RMA has also published a series of monographs and the Royal Musical Association Research Chronicle that has generally come out yearly since 1961, published by Taylor & Francis.
