= Fantasias for Guitar and Banjo =

Studio album by Sandy Bull
- Released: August 1963
- Recorded: 1963
- Genres: Folk, American primitivism
- Length: 42:23
- Label: Vanguard

Sandy Bull chronology
Fantasias for Guitar and Banjo (1963)	Inventions (1965)

Fantasias for Guitar and Banjo is the debut album of the folk guitarist Sandy Bull, released in 1963 through Vanguard Records.

== Recording ==
Bull recorded the album accompanied by Billy Higgins, a session jazz drummer who had previously appeared on early Ornette Coleman records. Together they recorded three original pieces as well as interpretations of Carmina Burana Fantasy and Non nobis Domine.

== Music ==
The highlight of Fantasias for Guitar and Banjo is usually considered to be its opener "Blend", a lengthy improvisational piece. According to Bull, the ideas behind the piece originated from his admiration of Folkways Records, which documented ethnic music from across the world. He also claimed to being particularly inspired from hearing Ravi Shankar and Ali Akbar Khan in New York City. "Blend" has been viewed as a "virtual travelogue of styles done in a then revolutionary modal tuning". The tuning is in the key of B.

== Release and reception ==
Professional ratings
Review scores
Source	Rating
AllMusic	3/5 stars
The Rolling Stone Record Guide	2/5 stars

Matthew Greenwald of AllMusic describes Fantasias for Guitar and Banjo as an "incredible debut" and lauds it for being well ahead of its time. Writing in Crawdaddy in December 1966, Sandy Pearlman recognized the album as a work that presaged pop music's move toward raga rock. Pearlman said that, with Fantasias, Bull "became a leading innovator in the assimilation of Indian influences into a Western musical context".

Author Kevin Fellezs views the album as a prime example of an "underacknowledged early fusion-world recording that remains musically compelling today".

== Track listing ==
Side one
No.	Title	Writer(s)	Length
1.	"Blend"	Bull	22:00

Side two
No.	Title	Writer(s)	Length
1.	"Carmina Burana Fantasy"	Orff	4:34
2.	"Non nobis Domine"	Byrd	1:39
3.	"Little Maggie"	Bull	4:09
4.	"Gospel Tune"	Bull	10:01

== Personnel ==
- Sandy Bull – banjo, guitar
- Billy Higgins – drums
