= Guillaume de Machaut =

Medieval French composer and poet (c. 1300–1377)

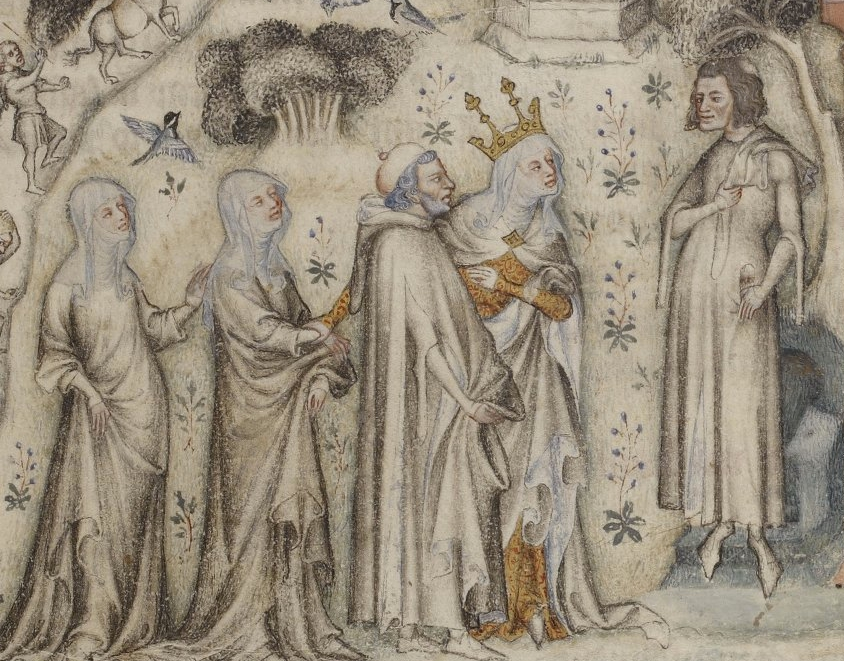
- Machaut (right) receiving Nature and three of her children, from an illuminated Parisian manuscript of the 1350s
- Born: c. 1300; Reims, France
- Died: 1377 (Note: Machaut died in 1377, but his exact date of death is unknown. Many favor April 1377, but some avoid a specific date all together. Others are more cautious: the musicologist Elizabeth Eva Leach only notes that "Sometime before 9 November 1377, when prebend number forty passed to Johannes de Gibourty, Machaut died." Without explanation, musicologist Anthony Pryer gives 13 April 1377.); Reims, France
- Occupations: Composer; Poet
- Works: List of compositions

Guillaume de Machaut (French: [ɡijom də maʃo]; Old French: [ɡiˈʎawmə də maˈtʃaw(θ)]; also Machau and Machault; c. 1300 – 1377) was a French composer and poet who was the central figure of the ars nova style in late medieval music. His dominance of the genre is such that modern musicologists use his death to separate the ars nova from the subsequent ars subtilior movement. Regarded as the most significant French composer and poet of the 14th century, he is often seen as the century's leading European composer.

Machaut, one of the earliest European composers on whom considerable biographical information is available, has an unprecedented amount of surviving music, in part due to his own involvement in his manuscripts' creation and preservation. Machaut embodies the culmination of the poet-composer tradition stretching back to the traditions of troubadour and trouvère. His poetry was greatly admired and imitated by other poets, including Geoffrey Chaucer and Eustache Deschamps, well into the 15th century.

Machaut composed in a wide range of styles and forms and was crucial in developing the motet and secular song forms (particularly the lai and the formes fixes: rondeau, virelai and ballade). Among his only surviving sacred works, Messe de Nostre Dame, is the earliest known complete setting of the Ordinary of the Mass attributable to a single composer. Other notable works include the rondeaux "Ma fin est mon commencement" and "Rose, liz, printemps, verdure" as well as the virelai "Douce Dame Jolie".

== Life and career ==
Guillaume de Machaut was born around 1300, one of seven children, and educated in the region around Reims. His surname most likely derives from the nearby town of Machault, 30 km northeast of Reims in the Ardennes region. He was employed as secretary to John I, Count of Luxembourg and King of Bohemia from 1323 to 1346, and also became a canon (1337). He often accompanied King John on his various trips, many of them military expeditions around Europe (including Prague). He was named the canon of Verdun in 1330, Arras in 1332, and Reims in 1337. In 1346, King John was killed fighting at the Battle of Crécy, and Machaut, who was famous and much in demand, entered the service of various other aristocrats and rulers, including King John's daughter Bonne (who died of the Black Death in 1349), her sons Jean de Berry and Charles (later Charles V, Duke of Normandy), and others such as Charles II of Navarre.

Machaut survived the Black Death that devastated Europe, and spent his later years living in Reims composing and supervising the creation of his complete-works manuscripts. His poem Le voir dit (probably 1361–1365) purports to recount a late love affair with a 19-year-old girl, Péronne d'Armentières, although the accuracy of the work as autobiography is contested.

Machaut died sometime in 1377, perhaps during April.

== Music ==
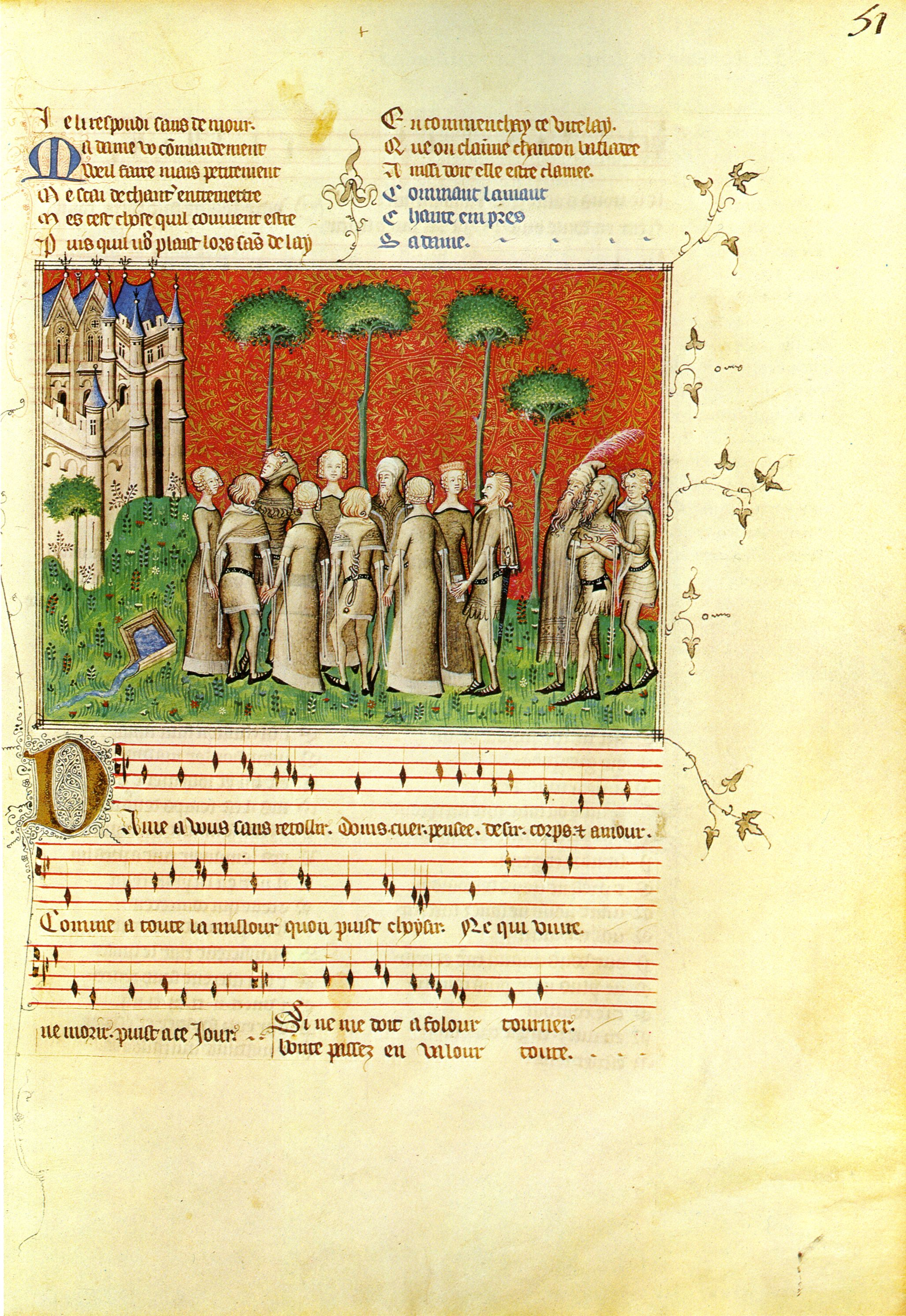
An illumination in a manuscript of Machaut's poem Le remède de fortune showing an outdoors dancing scene

Machaut's music comprises a wide variety, from complex masses to short songs, and despite the differences of genre, most still contain "typical Machaut motifs". He lived after the flowering of both the secular troubadour and trouvère song movements and the ars antiqua church style. The musicologist Gilbert Reaney notes that "before [Machaut], composers either wrote songs or church music. Machaut did both, though it could be said that he neglected the area of liturgical church music." Besides his mass, Hoquetus David and a few Latin motets, Machaut's surviving output is exclusively secular. (Note: Reaney notes that although some of his motets could have been for worshipping Mary, they were (courtly) love songs at their core.) Regardless, Reaney notes that his unique mastery of both secular and sacred Western music is only precedented by the work of Adam de la Halle.

=== Secular music ===
The lyrics of Machaut's works almost always dealt with courtly love. A few works exist to commemorate a particular event, such as M18, "Bone Pastor/Bone Pastor/Bone Pastor." Machaut mostly composed in five genres: the lai, the virelai, the motet, the ballade, and the rondeau. In these genres, Machaut retained the basic formes fixes, but often utilized creative text setting and cadences. For example, most rondeau phrases end with a long melisma on the penultimate syllable. However, a few of Machaut's rondeaux, such as R18 "Puis qu'en oubli", are mostly syllabic in treatment.

Machaut's motets often contain sacred texts in the tenor, such as in M12 "Corde mesto cantando/Helas! pour quoy virent/Libera me". The top two voices in these three-part compositions, in contrast, sing secular French texts, creating interesting concordances between the sacred and secular. In his other genres, though, he does not utilize sacred texts.

=== Sacred music ===
Kyrie from the Messe de Nostre Dame
By Guillaume de Machaut, midi instrumental version

Machaut's cyclic setting of the Mass, identified in one source as the Messe de Nostre Dame (Mass of Our Lady), was composed in the early 1360s probably for Rheims Cathedral. While not the first cyclic mass – the Tournai Mass is earlier – it was the first by a single composer and conceived as a unit. Machaut was probably familiar with the Tournai Mass since Machaut's Mass shares many stylistic features with it, including textless interludes.

Whether or not Machaut's mass is indeed cyclic is contested; after lengthy debate, musicologists are still deeply divided. However, there is a consensus that this mass is at best a forerunner to the later 15th-century cyclic masses by the likes of Josquin des Prez. Machaut's mass differs from these in the following ways: (1) he does not hold a tonal centre throughout the entire work, as the mass uses two distinct modes (one for the Kyrie, Gloria, and Credo, another for Sanctus, Agnus and Ite missa est); (2) there is no extended melodic theme that clearly runs through all the movements, and the mass does not use the parody technique; (3) there is considerable evidence that this mass was not composed in one creative act. The fact that the movements were placed together does not mean they were conceived as such.

Nevertheless, the mass can be said to be stylistically consistent, and certainly the chosen chants are all celebrations of Mary, the mother of Jesus. Also adding weight to the claim that the mass is cyclic is the possibility that the piece was written or assembled for performance at a specific celebration. The possibility that it was for the coronation of Charles V, which was once widely accepted, is thought unlikely in modern scholarship. The composer's intention that the piece be performed as one entire mass setting makes the Messe de Nostre Dame generally considered a cyclic composition.

== Poetry ==
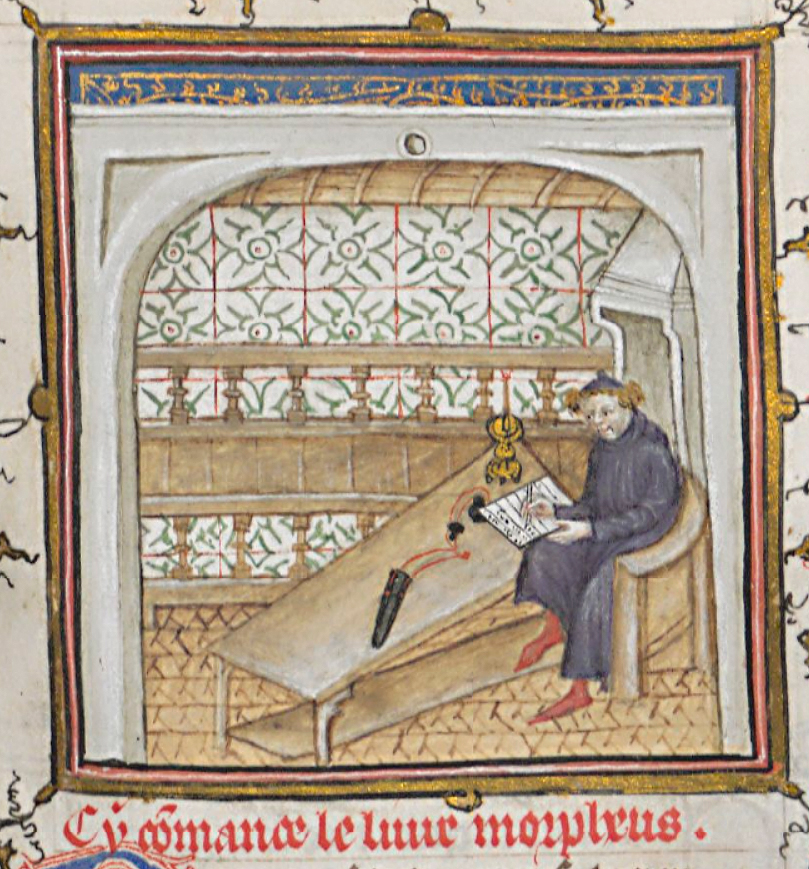
Illumination of Machaut writing Le Dit de la Fonteinne Amoureuse

Guillaume de Machaut's lyric output comprises around 400 poems, including 235 ballades, 76 rondeaux, 39 virelais, 24 lais, 10 complaintes, and 7 chansons royales, and Machaut did much to perfect and codify these fixed forms. Some of his lyric output is embedded in his narrative poems or "dits", such as Le remède de fortune ("The Cure of Ill Fortune") which includes one of each genre of lyric poetry, and Le voir dit ("A True Story"), but most are included in a separate, unordered section entitled Les loanges des dames. That the majority of his lyrics are not set to music (in manuscripts, music and non-music sections are separate) suggests that he normally wrote the text before setting some to music.

Other than his Latin motets of a religious nature and some poems invoking the horrors of war and captivity, the vast majority of Machaut's lyric poems reflect the conventions of courtly love, and involve statements of service to a lady and the poet's pleasure and pains. In technical terms, Machaut was a master of elaborate rhyme schemes, and this concern makes him a precursor to the Grands Rhétoriqueurs of the 15th century.

Guillaume de Machaut's narrative output is dominated by the "dit" (literally "spoken", i.e. a poem not meant to be sung). These first-person narrative poems (all but one are written in octosyllabic rhymed couplets, like the romance, or "roman" of the same period) follow many of the conventions of the Roman de la rose, including the use of allegorical dreams (songes), allegorical characters, and the situation of the narrator-lover attempting to return toward or satisfy his lady.

Machaut is also the author of a poetic chronicle of the chivalric deeds of Peter I of Cyprus, (the Prise d'Alexandrie), and of poetic works of consolation and moral philosophy. His unusual self-reflective usage of himself (as his lyrical persona) as the narrator of his dits yields some personal philosophical insights as well.

At the end of his life, Machaut wrote a poetic treatise on his craft (his Prologue). This reflects on his conception of the organization of poetry into set genres and rhyme schemes, and the ordering of these genres into distinct sections of manuscripts. This preoccupation with ordering his oeuvre is reflected in an index to MS A entitled "Vesci l'ordonance que G. de Machaut veut qu'il ait en son livre" ("Here is the order that G. de Machaut wants his book to have").

The poem below, Puis qu'en oubli, is his 18th rondeau.

Puis qu'en oubli sui de vous, dous amis,
Vie amoureuse et joie a Dieu commant.
Mar vi le jour que m'amour en vous mis,
Puis qu'en oubli sui de vous, dous amis.
Mais ce tenray que je vous ay promis,
C'est que ja mais n'aray nul autre amant.
Puis qu'en oubli sui de vous, dous amis,
Vie amoureuse et joie a Dieu commant.

Translation:

Since I am forgotten by you, sweet friend,
To a love life, and to happiness, I bid goodbye.
Unlucky was the day I put my love in you,
Since I am forgotten by you, sweet friend.
Yet I will keep what I have promised you,
Which is that never will I have another lover.
Since I am forgotten by you, sweet friend,
To a love life, and to happiness, I bid goodbye.

=== Principal works ===
- Le remède de fortune ("The Cure of Ill Fortune") (c. 1340s, before 1357) – The narrator is asked by his lady whether the poem she has found is by him; the narrator flees from her and comes to a garden where "Hope" consoles him and teaches him how to be a good lover; he returns to his lady.
- Jugement du roy de Behaigne ("Judgement of the King of Bohemia") (before 1346) – The narrator hears a debate between a lady (whose lover is dead) and a knight (betrayed by his lady); in order to proclaim one or the other the most unhappy, the narrator seeks out the advice of the King of Bohemia who consults allegories, and the unhappy knight is declared the winner.
- Dit du Lyon ("Story of the Lion") (1342) – The narrator comes to a magical island and a lion guides him to a beautiful lady; an old knight comes to the narrator and reveals the meaning of what he sees and gives him advice for being a better lover.
- Dit de l'Alérion aka Dit des quatre oiseaux ("Story of the 4 Birds") (before 1349) – A symbolic tale of love: the narrator raises four different birds, but each one flees him; one day the second (and preferred) bird comes back to him.
- Jugement du roy de Navarre ("Judgement of the King of Navarre") (1349) – Following up on the Jugement du roy de Behainge, a lady blames the narrator for awarding the prize to the knight: the King of Navarre is consulted and condemns the poet.
- Confort d'ami (1357) – Dedicated to Charles II of Navarre (who was a prisoner in France), this poetic consolation gives biblical and classical examples (exempla) of fortitude.
- Dit de la fontaine amoureuse aka Livre de Morpheus ("Story of the Amorous Fountain") (1361) – The narrator meets a hopeless lover who must separate from his lady; the two men come to a magical fountain and fall asleep, and in a dream the lady consoles her lover.
- Le voir dit ("A True Story") (c. 1362–65) – Often seen as Machaut's masterpiece, this poem is an early example of meta-fiction, and tells of the sadness and separation of the narrator from his lady, and of the false rumors that are spread about him. The narrative is stuffed with prose letters and lyric poems that the narrator claims were in truth exchanged by the unhappy lovers and put in the book at the behest of his lady. The work is, however, highly satirical, and mocks the conventional paradigm of medieval courtly literature by presenting himself as an old, ill, impotent poet who becomes the lover of a young and beautiful maiden, who falls in love with him from his reputation as a poet alone. Though the work is called a voir dit or true story, Machaut includes many inconsistencies which force the reader to question the truthfulness of his story.
- Prologue (c. 1372) – written at the end of his life as a preface to his collected works, this allegory describes Machaut's principles of poetry, music and rhetoric, as imparted to him by Nature and Love.
- Prise d'Alexandrie (after 1369) – poetic retelling of the exploits of Peter of Lusignan, King of Jerusalem and of Cyprus.

== Legacy ==
When he died in 1377, other composers such as F. Andrieu wrote elegies lamenting his death.

Machaut's poetry had a direct effect on the works of Eustache Deschamps, Jean Froissart, Christine de Pizan, René d'Anjou and Geoffrey Chaucer, among many others. There exists the hypothetical (though improbable) possibility that Chaucer and Machaut could have met when Chaucer was taken prisoner near Reims in 1359, or in Calais in 1360, with both poets on official business for the ratification of the Treaty of Brétigny (Machaut with his patron Jean de Berry, who was departing for England, and Chaucer as a messenger to Prince Lionel).

According to food historian William Woys Weaver, fourteenth century nobles at the French-speaking Lusignan court in Nicosia, Cyprus, often listened to narrations of Machaut's Prise d’Alexandrie for entertainment during royal banquets. Tales like Machaut's, about heroic Crusader figures, reinforced the self-image that Lusignan courtiers cultivated as long-distance claimants to Jerusalem.

== Recordings ==
=== Selected recordings ===
Selected recordings of compositions by Guillaume de Machaut
Year	Album (Note: Although some albums contain works by composers other than Machaut, only works by Machaut are listed.)	Ensemble	Director	Label
1973	Chansons – Vol. 1	Studio der Frühen Musik	Thomas Binkley	EMI
1973	Chansons – Vol. 2	Studio der Frühen Musik	Thomas Binkley	EMI
1983	The Mirror of Narcissus	Gothic Voices	Christopher Page	Hyperion CDA66087
1989	Messe de Notre Dame	The Hilliard Ensemble	Paul Hillier	Hyperion
1994	Remede de Fortune	Ensemble Project Ars Nova	Robert Mealy	New Albion Records NA068CD
1996	La Messe de Nostre Dame / Le Voir Dit	Oxford Camerata	Jeremy Summerly	Naxos
1997	Dreams in the Pleasure Garden: Chansons	Orlando Consort	–	DG 477 6731
2002	Les motets	Ensemble Musica Nova	Lucien Kandel	Harmonia Mundi
2003	Guillaume de Machaut: Unrequited	Liber UnUsualis	–	LU 1001
2004	Motets	The Hilliard Ensemble	–	ECM
2007	Je, Guillaumes dessus nommez	Ensemble Gilles Binchois	Dominique Vellard	Cantus C 9804–6
2009	Ballades	Ensemble Musica Nova	Lucien Kandel	Æon AECD 0982
2009	Guillaume de Machaut: Messe de Nostre Dame	Diabolus in Musica	Antoine Guerber	Alpha 132
2010	Messe Notre-Dame	Ensemble Musica Nova	Lucien Kandel	Æon AECD 1093
2011	Sacred and Secular music	Ensemble Gilles Binchois	Dominique Vellard	Brilliant Classics 94217

=== Arrangements ===
Selected recordings of arrangements of compositions by Guillaume de Machaut
Year	Album	Ensemble	Arrangement	Label
1997	Early Music (Lachrymæ Antiquæ)	Kronos Quartet	String quartet	Nonesuch 79457
2004	Ma fin est mon commencement	Louis Thiry	Organ	Éditions Hortus
2009	Art of Love: Music of Machaut	Robert Sadin (Note: Including contributions by Mark Feldman, Hassan Hakmoun, John Ellis, Lionel Loueke, Brad Mehldau and Milton Nascimento)	Various	DG

=== Early recordings ===
- 1936 – Guillaume de Machaut. Messe de Notre-Dame, dite du sacre de Charles V. Les Paraphonistes de St-Jean des Matines (choir and brass); Guillaume de Van, dir. Standard-groove recording, 2 discs: 78 rpm, 12 in., monaural. Anthologie sonore 31: AS 74; AS 75; AS 76; AS 77; [Paris]: L'Anthologie Sonore.
- 1938 – Guillaume de Machaut. Hoquetus David. Jean Archimbaud (soprano); André Lafosse (bass trumpet); Tudesq (trombone); Guillaume de Van, dir. Standard-groove recording, 1 disc: 78 rpm; 12 in., monaural. Éditions de l'Oiseau-Lyre OL 3; 1059; M6-91643; 1063. M6-91647. [Paris]: Éditions de l'Oiseau-Lyre.
- 1938 – Guillaume de Machaut. Quant Theseus (double ballade); Je puis trop bien (ballade); De tout sui si confortée (virelai). Henriette Guermant, soprano; La Société Pro Musica Antiqua de Bruxelles; Safford Cape, director. Standard-groove recording, 1 disc: 78 rpm, 12 in., monaural. (Anthologie sonore 67 (AS-140, AS-135). [France] : L'Anthologie sonore, 1938.
- 1943 – Guillaume de Machaut. Si je soupire; Douce dame jolie; He! Dame de vaillance. Pierre Deniau, tenor; instrumental accompaniment. Standard-groove recording, 1 disc, 78 rpm, 10 in., monaural. Lumen XC 462; XC 463; 33405; France: Lumen.
- Guillaume de Machaut. Rose lys; Anon (Montpellier no. 189, 13th century). A la clarté. Anon (Montpellier no. 184, 13th century). Hui main. Anon (14th century). Amour que vous ai-je fait. Anon (15th century). Trop penser. Simone Gebelin, voice; H. Akoka, clarinet; G. Bon, flute; P. Hongne, bassoon. Standard-groove recording, 1 disc: 78 rpm; 312 in., monaural. BAM 44. [N.p.]: Boîte à Musique, 1948.
- 1956 – Guillaume de Machaut. Messe de Notre Dame: dite "du Sacre de Charles V". Jean Archimbaud, soprano; Pierre Deniau, haute-contre, Georges Cathelat, tenor; Eugène Bousquet, baritone; Marcel Vigneron, bass; l'Ensemble Vocal er Instrumental, Roger Blanchard, dir. LP recording, 1 disc: 33 rpm. 10 in., monaural. Ducretet Thomson 270C085. [Paris]: Ducretet Thomson.
