= Stella Splendens =

Medieval song

Stella splendens ("Splendid star") is a polyphonic song (fol. 21v–22), with two parts voices from the Llibre Vermell de Montserrat, one of the oldest extant medieval manuscripts containing music.

== Text ==
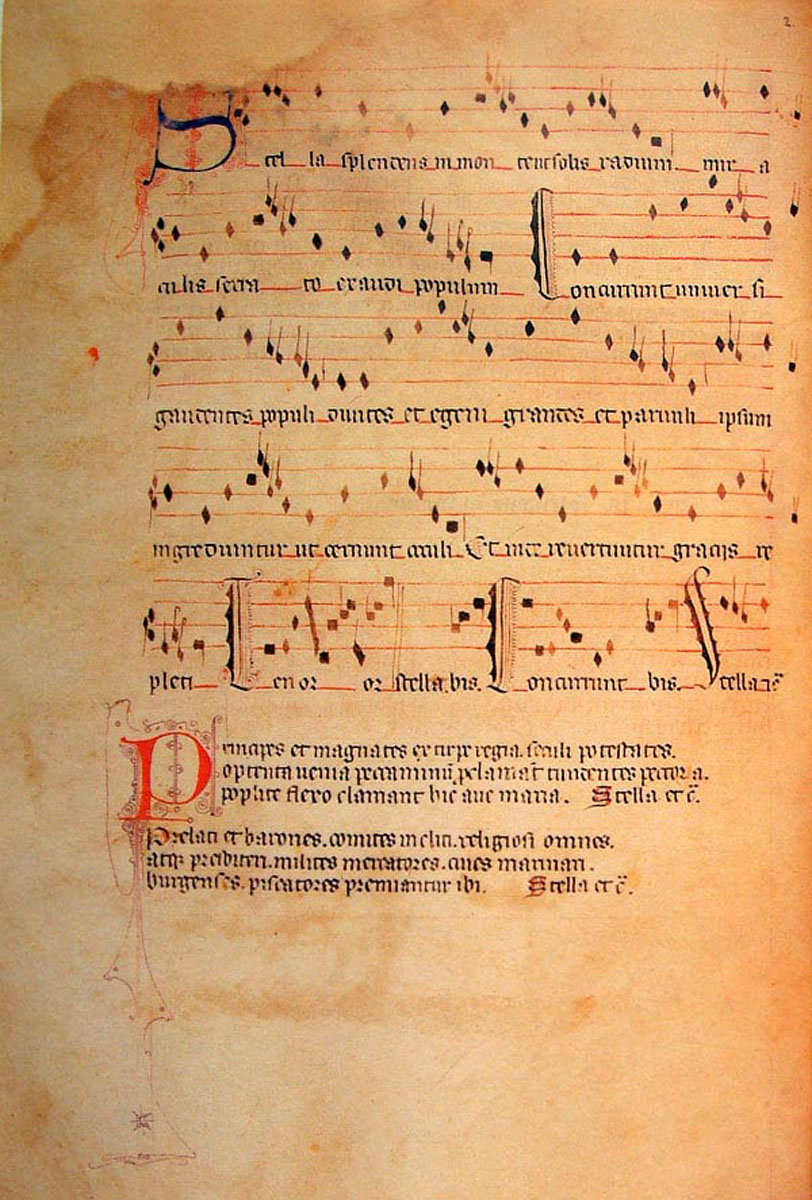
Stella splendens in the Llibre Vermell de Montserrat

Latin original

[Sequitur alia cantilena ad trepudium rotundum]

Stella splendens in monte ut solis radium
miraculis serrato exaudi populum.

Concurrunt universi gaudentes populi
divites et egeni grandes et parvuli
ipsum ingrediuntur ut cernunt oculi
et inde revertuntur gracijis repleti.

Principes et magnates extirpe regia
saeculi potestates obtenta venia
peccaminum proclamant tundentes pectora
poplite flexo clamant hic: Ave Maria.

Prelati et barones comites incliti
religiosi omnes atque presbyteri
milites mercatores cives marinari
burgenses piscatores praemiantur ibi.

Rustici aratores nec non notarii
advocati scultores cuncti ligni fabri
sartores et sutores nec non lanifici
artifices et omnes gratulantur ibi.

Reginae comitissae illustres dominae
potentes et ancillae juvenes parvulae
virgines et antiquae pariter viduae
conscendunt et hunc montem et religiosae.

Coetus hic aggregantur hic ut exhibeant
vota regratiantur ut ipsa et reddant
aulam istam ditantes hoc cuncti videant
jocalibus ornantes soluti redeant.

Cuncti ergo precantes sexus utriusque
mentes nostras mundantes oremus devote
virginem gloriosam matrem clementiae
in coelis gratiosam sentiamus vere.

== Recordings ==
In modern times it has been recorded by many artists:

- Jordi Savall, Hespèrion XX (album Llibre Vermell de Montserrat - siglo XIV, 1978)
- Estampie (album Ave maris stella, 1991)
- The New London Consort, directed by Philip Pickett (album Llibre vermell, pilgrim songs & dances, 1992)
- Capilla Musical y Escolanía de la Santa Cruz del Valle de los Caídos & Atrium Musicae, directed by Luis Lozano & Gregorio Paniagua (album Canto antiguo español, 1994)
- Companyia Elèctrica Dharma & Grallers De L'Acord (album 20 Anys Electrica Dharma, 1994)
- Schola Gregoriana Mediolanensis, directed by Giovanni Vianini (album Ad cantica, 1994)
- Corvus Corax (album Tritonus, 1995)
- Ensemble Micrologus: "Stella splendens (ballata)" (album in festa, 1995)
- Tri Yann: "Arthur Plantagenest" (album Portraits, 1995)
- Adaro (album Stella splendens, 1997)
- Novalia (album Canti e briganti, 1997)
- In Extremo (album Weckt Die Toten!, 1998)
- Studio der Frühen Musik directed by Thomas Binkley (album Secular music c1300, 1998)
- Corona Borealis (album Cantus Paganus, 2000)
- La Rossignol, Anno Domini MCCC (2000)
- Psalteria (album Scalerica d'oro, 2001)
- Capella de Ministrers (album Llibre Vermell, 2002)
- Hughes de Courson (album Lux Obscura: Un Projet Electro-Medieval, 2003)
- Saltatio Mortis (album Heptessenz – Marktmusik des Mittelalters, 2003)
- Vox Vulgaris (album The Shape of Medieval Music to Come, 2003)
- Barco Brena (album The celts on the organ, 2004)
- Cornix Maledictum (album Mariage en noir, 2004)
- Qntal (album Illuminate, 2004)
- Heimatærde (maxi-single Hick hack hackebeil, 2016)
- Welladay (album Dedication, 2004)
- Arcana Obscura (album Aderlass vol.5, 2007)
