= Ad Mortem Festinamus =

Song from 1399

Ad Mortem Festināmus is a monodic song (fol. 26v) from the 1399 manuscript Llibre Vermell de Montserrat. Its lyrics deal with the inevitability of death and the need to stop sinning. Its first few verses overlap with those of “Scribere Proposui”, a song from the 1582 Piae Cantiones. It has been recorded by a variety of artists, including the electronic neo-medieval act Qntal, that gave new music to the lyrics and made it a club hit in 1992.

== Lyrics ==
As written in the original manuscript, with line breaks added, parts marked with “iterum” written out in full, “u” and “v” differentiated, punctuation modernized, and abbreviations expanded:

Ad mortem festinamus:
peccare desistamus.
Peccare desistamus.

Scribere proposui de contemptu mundano,
ut degentes seculi non mulcentur in vano;
iam est hora surgere a sompno mortis pravo.
A sompno mortis pravo.

Ad mortem festinamus:
peccare desistamus.
Peccare desistamus.

Vita brevis breviter in brevi finietur,
mors venit velociter quae neminem veretur,
omnia mors perimit et nulli miseretur.
Et nulli miseretur.

Ad mortem festinamus:
peccare desistamus.
Peccare desistamus.

Ni conversus fueris et sicut puer factus
et vitam mutaveris in meliores actus,
intrare non poteris regnum Dei beatus.
Regnum Dei beatus.

Ad mortem festinamus:
peccare desistamus.
Peccare desistamus.

Tuba cum sonuerit, dies erit extrema,
et iudex advenerit, vocabit sempiterna
electos in patria, prescitos ad inferna.
Prescitos ad inferna.

Ad mortem festinamus:
peccare desistamus.
Peccare desistamus.

Quam felices fuerint, qui cum christo regnabunt;
facie ad faciem sic eum spectabunt,
sanctus, sanctus dominus sabaoth conclamabunt.
Sabaoth conclamabunt.

Ad mortem festinamus:
peccare desistamus.
Peccare desistamus.

Et quam tristes fuerint, qui eterne peribunt,
pene non deficient, nec propter has obibunt,
heu, heu, heu, miserrimi, numquam inde exibunt.
Numquam inde exibunt.

Ad mortem festinamus:
peccare desistamus.
Peccare desistamus.

Cuncti reges seculi et in mundo magnates
adventant et clerici omnesque potestates,
fiant velut parvuli, dimitant vanitates.
Dimitant vanitates.

Ad mortem festinamus:
peccare desistamus.
Peccare desistamus.

Heu, fratres karissimi, si digne contemplemus
passionem domini, amare et si flemus,
ut pupillam occuli servabit, ne peccemus.
Servabit, ne peccemus.

Ad mortem festinamus:
peccare desistamus.
Peccare desistamus.

Alma virgo virginum, in celis coronata,
apud tuum filium sis nobis advocata
et post hoc exilium ocurrens mediata.
Ocurrens mediata.

Ad mortem festinamus:
peccare desistamus.
Peccare desistamus.

O mors, quam amara est memoria tua.
Vile cadaver eris. Cur non peccare vereris?
Vile cadaver eris. Cur intumescere quæris?
Vile cadaver eris, Ut quid peccuniam quæris?
Vile cadaver eris. Quid vestes pomposas geris?
Vile cadaver eris, Ut quid honores quæris?
Vile cadaver eris. Cur non paenitens confiteris?
Vile cadaver eris. Contra proximum non leteris.

== Modern recordings ==
- Jordi Savall, Hespèrion XX (album Llibre Vermell de Montserrat - siglo XIV, 1978)
- The New London Consort directed by Philip Pickett (album Llibre vermell, pilgrim songs & dances, 1992)
- Qntal (album Qntal I, 1992)
- Capilla Musical y Escolanía de la Santa Cruz del Valle de los Caídos & Atrium Musicae, directed by Luis Lozano & Gregorio Paniagua (album Canto Antiguo Español, 1994)
- Alla francesca (album Llibre Vermell de Montserrat, cantigas de Santa Maria, 1994)
- Ensemble Micrologus (album In Festa, 1995)
- Gothart (album "Stella Splendens", 1997)
- Studio der Frühen Musik directed by Thomas Binkley (album Secular music c1300, 1998)
- Companyia Elèctrica Dharma: "Festinamus (reprise)" (album Llibre Vermell, 2002)
- Ioculatores (album Media Vita in Morte Sumus, 2004)
- Lamia (album La Maquina de Dios, 2006)
- Choeur de Chambre de Namur (album Llibre Vermell, 2007)
- Luc Arbogast (album Canticum in Terra, 2012)
- Subway to Sally (album Mitgift, 2014)
