= O Virgo Splendens =

O Virgo Splendens ("O Splendid Virgin") is a monodic song (fol. 21v-22) from the Llibre Vermell de Montserrat, one of the oldest extant medieval manuscripts containing music.

== Recordings ==
In modern times it has been recorded by many artists:

- Jordi Savall, Hespèrion XX (album Llibre Vermell de Montserrat - siglo XIV, 1978)
- New London Consort directed by Philip Pickett (album Llibre vermell, pilgrim songs & dances, 1992)
- Ensemble Anonymus (album Llibre vermell, 1993)
- Qntal (album Qntal II, 1995)
- Studio der Frühen Musik directed by Thomas Binkley: "Llibre vermell" (album Secular music c1300, 1998)
- Schelmish (album Codex lascivus, 2002)
- Wolfenmond: "O virgo splendens" (album Wintersturm, 2005)
- Ensemble Rayuela (album Rayuela, 2006)
- Choeur de Chambre de Namur (album Llibre Vermell, 2007)
