= Veni Veni =

Single by Helium Vola
- A-side: "Veni Veni"
- B-side: "Printemps"; "Mahnung"
- Released: February 9, 2004
- Genre: Darkwave
- Length: 23:21
- Label: Chrom Records
- Songwriter: Ernst Horn

Helium Vola singles chronology
"Omnis Mundi Creatura" (2001)	"Veni Veni" (2004)	"In lichter Farbe steht der Wald" (2004)

"Veni Veni" is a maxi single released by the German "electro-medieval" band Helium Vola. It was released 9 February 2004 by Chrom Records. The lyrics are from Carmen Burana set to European club music and rhythms.

== Track listing ==
1. "Veni Veni (Club Version)" – 6:13
2. "Printemps" – 5:32
3. "Mahnung" – 3:39
4. "Veni Veni (Radio Edit)" – 8:37
