= Nigel Rogers =

English tenor (1935–2022)

Nigel David Rogers
- Born: 21 March 1935; Wellington, Shropshire
- Died: 19 January 2022 (aged 86)
- Genres: Early music, baroque and sacred music

Nigel David Rogers (21 March 1935 – 19 January 2022) was an English multilingual tenor, music conductor, and vocal coach, who sang in over seventy classical music album recordings in German, French, Italian, Latin and English, mostly of early music, baroque and sacred music, including works by Claudio Monteverdi, Handel, Purcell, and Bach. Singing critics like Melanie Eskenazi describe him as a vocal virtuoso of the local phrasing and decoration (ornamenti) of those particular musical periods exactly as they were practised back then. He was considered a world authority in the field of European early music, the scores of which he helped promote and rescue as a music genre, since the outset of his early career.

== Early life ==
A native of Wellington, Shropshire, Rogers was brought up in a musical family where his father sang in a choir and his mother taught the piano, so from a very early age he was studying music. Educated at Wellington Grammar School, Nigel Rogers studied at King's College, Cambridge (where he was a choral scholar) from 1953 to 1956, in Rome in 1957, in Milan from 1958 to 1959, and with Gerhard Hüsch at the Munich Hochschule für Musik (1959–1961). Whilst in Munich, along with Thomas Binkley, Sterling Jones and Andrea von Ramm, he was a founder member of the pioneering medieval ensemble, Studio der Frühen Musik (Early Music Quartet) with which he worked for around three years, leaving the group in December 1963. He made 11 recordings with them between 1962 and 1970, including the award winning album of John Dowland on the Archiv label released in 1966.

== Opera career ==
Rogers made his operatic debut in Amsterdam, and sang in many renowned international opera houses. He gave numerous singing master classes and workshops at music conservatories worldwide, for early music and opera singers of all nationalities.

Operas with which he was notably associated include L'Orfeo by Monteverdi, in which he took the title role and made many recordings. From 1978 until his retirement he was a professor of classical singing and operatic voice coach at the Royal College of Music in London. In 1979 he founded and thereupon conducted the vocal ensemble Chiaroscuro for the performance of Italian baroque compositions.

In July 1993 he starred at a Handel oratorio at the Palacio de Bellas Artes Opera House in Mexico City. In May 1994, two great-great grandchildren of President of Mexico Valentín Canalizo, Antonio Haas Canalizo, patron of the Mazatlán Opera House "Teatro Ángela Peralta", classical and jazz pianist, and founder of the Mazatlán Conservatory of Music and the Mazatlán Literature Award in Sinaloa state, Mexico, and his niece, soprano, jazz singer, castanets soloist, singer-songwriter and member of royalty, Lady Marina De Santiago-de Borbón Haas Canalizo (Lady Marina of Bourbon), Queen of Spain Isabella II of Bourbon's great-great granddaughter, invited Nigel Rogers to the city of Mazatlán. There he was acquainted with different styles of Mexican music, Mariachi, and Mexican Carnival band music. Rogers became a close long-standing friend of Lady Marina of Bourbon, and the Haas Canalizo family, founders and former inhabitants of today's "Haas House Museum" (Casa Museo Haas) in Mazatlán, the family's mansion where Rogers stayed during his visit to Mazatlán before it was turned into a museum by the government of Sinaloa.

== Personal life and death ==
Rogers lived in Deal, Kent, with his harpsichordist Lithuanian wife Lina Zilinskyte and his daughter Georgina. On 3 May 2005, he gave his 70th birthday recital concert at Wigmore Hall in London, singing works by early music composers Carissimi, Caccini, Sigismondo d'India, Frescobaldi, Marco Marazzoli, Kapsberger, Rossi, Stradella, and Froberger.

He died on 19 January 2022, at the age of 86.
