= Helium Vola (album) =

Studio album by Helium Vola
- Released: October 29, 2001
- Genre: Darkwave
- Length: 56:12
- Label: Chrom Records

Helium Vola chronology
Helium Vola (2001)	Liod (2004)

Helium Vola is a studio album by the electronic band Helium Vola. It was released in October 2001 through Chrom Records. The album was re-released with the bonus CD Omnis Mundi Creatura on March 15, 2003.

== Track listing ==
1. "Funerali" – 0:55
2. "Les Habitants Du Soleil" – 3:39
3. "Omnis Mundi Creatura" – 6:04
4. "Begirlich In Dem Hertzen Min" – 4:41
5. "Je Chante Par Couverture" – 5:12
6. "Fama Tuba" – 4:34
7. "Lösespruch" – 3:14
8. "Sancte Sator" – 5:25
9. "Du Bist Min" – 5:05
10. "Du Tagte Ez" – 5:03
11. "Les Habitants Du Soleil (Reprise)" – 4:13
12. "Luvenes" – 1:10
13. "Selig" – 8:17

== Omnis Mundi Creatura Bonus CD ==
1. "Omnis Mundi Creatura (Album Version)" – 6:06
2. "Minne Und Treue" – 4:44
3. "Fama Tuba" – 4:36
4. "Omnis Mundi Creatura (Radio Version)" – 4:09

== Credits ==
- Artwork by, photography – TBA, Tim Becker Artwork
- Composed by Ernst Horn (tracks: 1 to 3, 5 to 14)
- Fiddle, Cornet, Oboe [Shawm] – Jan Harrison
- Harp – Uschi Laar
- Hurdy-gurdy – Riccardo Delfino
- Keyboards, music by – Ernst Horn
- Lyrics by Traditional (tracks: 3, 4, 6 to 10)
- Mastered by Christoph Stickel
- Other [Realization] – Carl D. Erling
- Producer – Ernst Horn
- Vocals – Sabine Lutzenberger, Susan Weiland
