= Indicator =

Indicator may refer to:

== Biology ==
- Environmental indicator of environmental health (pressures, conditions and responses)
- Ecological indicator of ecosystem health (ecological processes)
- Health indicator, which is used to describe the health of a population
- Honeyguides, also known as "indicator birds", a family of Old World tropical birds
  - Indicator (genus), a genus of birds in the honeyguide family
- Indicator species, a species that defines a characteristic of an environment
- Indicator bacteria, bacteria used to detect and estimate the level of fecal contamination of water
- Indicator organism, organisms used to measure such things as potential fecal contamination of environmental samples
- Indicator plant, a plant that acts as a measure of environmental conditions
- Indicator value, one of two terms in ecology referring to the classification of organisms
- Iodine–starch test, a method to test for the presence of starch or iodine.

== Chemistry ==
- Complexometric indicator, a chemical detector for metal ions in complexometric titrations.
- Humidity indicator card, a card impregnated with chemicals that change colour when a particular humidity is exceeded.
- pH indicator, a chemical detector for protons in acid-base titrations.
- Redox indicator, a chemical detector for redox titrations.
- Zeta potential, a property of interfaces in fluids for Zeta potential titration.

== Economics ==
- Economic indicator
- Macroeconomic indicators, economic indicators provided by agencies and bureaus of various government statistical organizations and sometimes by private organizations
- Performance indicator
- Technical indicator, a tool used in the technical analysis of financial securities

== Mathematics, engineering, and industry ==
- Indicator (distance amplifying instrument), any of various instruments used to accurately measure small distances, and amplify them to make them more obvious
- Indicator (metadata), a Boolean value that may contain only the values true or false and includes the meaning of these values
- Indicator (statistics), a concept in statistics, research design and social sciences
- Indicator diagram, a graph of pressure against stroke within a piston engine
- Indicator function of a subset of the domain, a concept in mathematics
- Indicator light
- Indicator net, nets anchored at various depths to the sea bed around Allied naval bases during World War II intended to entangle U-boat traffic of the enemy
- Indicator of compromise, an artifact observed in computer forensics that indicates an intrusion

== Other uses ==
- Indicator (Deine Lakaien album), 2010
- Indicator (Onward to Olympas album), 2012
- Indicator Island, in the Argentine Islands of Antarctica
- The Indicator (1819–1821), a weekly literary journal edited by Leigh Hunt
- The Indicator, a daily podcast produced by Planet Money
- A synonym for the turn signal of an automobile

== See also ==
- Indicate/indication (disambiguation)
- Indicatrix
