= Acoustic (Deine Lakaien album) =

Live album by Deine Lakaien
- Released: May 28, 2007
- Genres: Experimental; avant-garde; classical
- Length: 65:17
- Label: Chrom

Deine Lakaien chronology
Forest Enter Exit (1993)	Acoustic (2007)	Winter Fish Testosterone (1996)

Acoustic is the second live album to be released by the group Deine Lakaien. It was recorded in 1995 during the sold-out 1995 Acoustic Tour. The songs were performed unplugged with Alexander Veljanov's vocals backed by Ernst Horn on a prepared piano.

== Track listing ==
1. "Love Me to the End" – 5:02
2. "Lonely" – 4:23
3. "Down Down Down" – 3:51
4. "Mindmachine" – 4:44
5. "Nobody's Wounded" – 4:51
6. "Mirror Men" – 5:52
7. "Walk to the Moon" – 3:20
8. "Wasted Years" – 3:55
9. "2nd Sun" – 4:17
10. "Don't Wake Me Up" – 4:53
11. "Follow Me" – 4:30
12. "Madiel" – 3:52
13. "Dark Star" – 3:40
14. "Traitors" – 3:48
15. "Resurrection Machine" – 4:18

== See also ==
- Acoustic music
