= Wohin? =

Wohin? may refer to:

- Wohin? (film), a 1988 West German drama film
- Wohin? (album), a 2013 album by Helium Vola
