= Qntal III: Tristan und Isolde =

Qntal III

Studio album by Qntal
- Released: 2003
- Genre: Dark wave; neofolk; Medieval music; ethereal wave
- Label: Stars in the Dark / Noir Records

Qntal chronology
Qntal II (1995)	Qntal III (2003)	Nihil (2003)

Qntal III is the third album of the German dark wave band Qntal, released in 2003. It is a concept album based on the medieval narrative Tristan and Iseult. Many tracks feature original lyrics by poets of that period.

== Track listing ==
No.	Title	Writer(s)	Translation	Length
1.	"Ôwî, Tristan"	Qntal, Gottfried von Strassburg	Oh, Tristan	5:55
2.	"Name der Rose"	Qntal, Von Lille	Name of the Rose	5:28
3.	"Maiden in the Mor"	Anonymous, Qntal		6:33
4.	"Lamento de Tristano"	Qntal	Tristan's Lament	1:38
5.	"Am Morgen Fruo"	Qntal, Walther von der Vogelweide	Early in the Morning	4:52
6.	"Lasse"	Anonymous, Qntal	Tired	8:03
7.	"Ecce Gratum"	Carmina Burana, Qntal	Look, the Lovely [one]!	5:11
8.	"Spiegelglas"	Qntal, Von Strassburg	Mirror Glass	7:39
9.	"Maravillosos"	Cantigas de Santa Maria, Qntal	The Wonderful	4:02
10.	"Entre Moi et Mon Amin"	Anonymous, Qntal	Between Me and My Friend	7:20
11.	"Gottinne Minne"	Qntal, Von Strassburg	My Goddess	2:24
12.	"Vedes Amigo"	Cantiga de amigo, Qntal	The Waves, My Friend	6:40
13.	"Verirret"	Qntal	Lost	5:03

== Reception ==
Professional ratings
Review scores
Source	Rating
Prémonition	favourable
Sonic Seducer	favourable

German magazine Sonic Seducer gave Qntal III a positive review, remarking that the natural sound of III was something new after two albums of contrast between rather cold sounds and the vocals by singer Syrah. The album was lauded for its diverse interpretation of the Tristan tale using elements of ambient music, pop and world music. French magazine Prémonition observed that Ernst Horn's style had disappeared from Qntal's works after his leaving of the band but that Syrah's clear voice was still their main asset.
