= Für Euch, die Ihr liebt =

Studio album by Helium Vola
- Released: 2009
- Genre: Darkwave
- Label: Chrom Records

Helium Vola chronology
Liod (2004)	Für Euch, die Ihr liebt (2009)	Wohin? (2013)

Für Euch, die Ihr liebt is a double-CD studio album released by electro-medieval/darkwave band Helium Vola. It was released in 2009 by Chrom Records.

== Track listing ==
=== CD1 ===
1. "A Voi Che Amate" – 1:48
2. "Saber D'Amor" – 6:58
3. "Oh Pescador" – 4:14
4. "Blow, Northerne Wynd" – 5:32
5. "Mes Longs Cheveux" – 1:49
6. "L'Alba" – 5:28
7. "In So Hoher Swebender Wunne" – 6:23
8. "Friendly Fire" – 4:17
9. "Hor Che 'L Ciel" – 4:42
10. "Escoutatz" – 5:15
11. "Maienzeit" – 6:11
12. "Ecce Gratum" – 6:16

=== CD2 ===
1. "Preghiera" – 2:06
2. "Nummus" – 4:39
3. "Mayab" – 4:25
4. "Mord" – 3:14
5. "Canta Me" – 4:35
6. "Manifesto" – 5:03
7. "Quan Lo Pet" – 2:21
8. "Ray Gun" – 5:14
9. "Come Talore" – 3:31
10. "Darkness, Darkness" – 5:14
11. "Moorsoldaten" – 6:59
12. "Nuestrasz Vidas" – 8:01

== Credits ==
- Artwork - Tim Becker
- Cello - Jost Hecker
- Composed by Ernst Horn (tracks: 1-1, to 1-4, 1-6 to 1-12, 2-1 to 2-9, 2-12)
- Keyboards, producer - Ernst Horn
- Mastered by Christoph Stickel
- Viola - Olga Hübner
- Violin, guitar - Ralf Hübner
- Vocals - Sabine Lutzenberger
