= Estampie (band) =

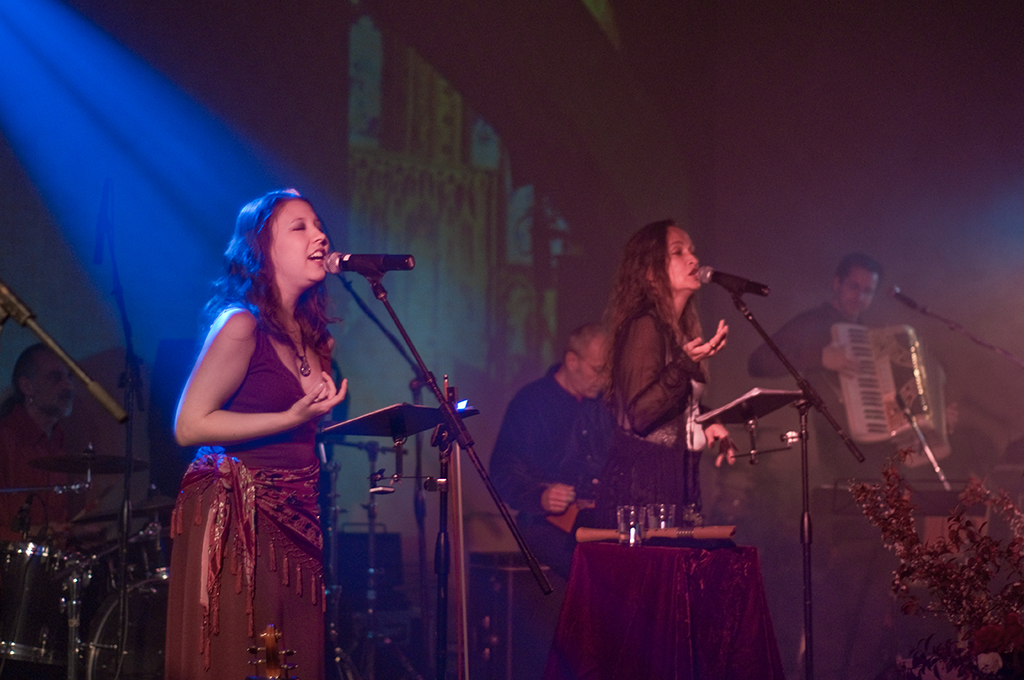
- Estampie playing in Hunt Valley, Maryland in 2010

Background information
- Genres: Neo-medieval folk; medieval classical music
- Years active: 1985–active
- Members: Sigrid Hausen; Michael Popp; Ernst Schwindl; Sascha Gotowtschikow; Christoph Pelgen; Sarah M. Newman
- Past members: Ute Rek; Cas Gevers; Thomas Zöller; Cornelia Meliän
- Website: www.estampie.de

Estampie (after the medieval dance estampie) is a German music group, founded in 1985 by Sigrid Hausen (aka Syrah), Michael Popp and Ernst Schwindl. The band plays primarily medieval music, with some modern influences from world and minimalist music.

The group is not connected to the Leeds-based British ensemble Estampie which recorded Under the Greenwood Tree for Naxos.

== Members ==
- Sigrid Hausen
- Michael Popp
- Ernst Schwindl
- Sascha Gotowtschikow
- Christoph Pelgen (formerly of Adaro)
- Sarah "Mariko" Newman (formerly of Unto Ashes)

== Discography ==
Estampie has released 8 studio albums, three of which were recorded in collaboration with Deine Lakaien singer Alexander Veljanov. Two more albums were recorded as Al Andaluz Project, a musical project of Estampie, Spanish Folk band L'Ham de Foc and Amán Amán.

Fin Amor, released in 2002, features an orchestra of 15 musicians. It covers themes of religious and mundane love based on texts of medieval troubadour poetry.

Their 2004 album Signum has been lauded for its arrangements that includes harps and flutes. The overall theme of this album is transience, featuring sensitive pieces as well as playful tracks.

=== Estampie albums ===
- A chantar - Lieder der Frauenminne (1990, reissued Christophorus)
- Ave maris stella - Marienverehrung im Mittelalter (1991, reissued Christophorus)
- Ludus Danielis - Ein mittelalterliches Mysterienspiel (1994); featuring Veljanov
- Crusaders - Lieder der Kreuzritter (1996); featuring Alexander Veljanov, reissued Christophorus
- Materia Mystica - Eine Hommage an Hildegard von Bingen (1998)
- Ondas - Musik von Troubadours und Flagellanten (2000); featuring Alexander Veljanov
- Fin Amor - Musik zwischen Liebe, Sehnsucht, Leidenschaft und dem rauen Nordwind (2002)
- Signum - Zeit und Vergänglichkeit im Mittelalter (2004)
- Secrets of the North (2012) - Scandinavian medieval legends

Compilations

- Best of Estampie - Die Frühphase, der Aufbruch, Die Trilogie und die Ethno-Phase (1986–2006) (2006)

=== DVD ===
- Marco Polo – Estampie und die Klänge der Seidenstraße - Live-DVD (2005)
- Gregorius auf dem Stein 2012

=== Al Andaluz Project ===
- Al Andaluz Project – Deus et Diabolus - Project with L'Ham de Foc and Amán Amán (2007)
- Al Andaluz Project – Al-Maraya (2010)
- Al Andaluz Project – Abuab Al Andaluz Live in Munich DVD 2012

== See also ==
- Qntal, a project that has Sigrid Hausen and Michael Popp, among others
