= Caccin =

Caccin may refer to:

- Giacomo Caccin (born 1997), Italian footballer
- 39335 Caccin, a minor planet

== See also ==
- Caccini
