= Helium Vola =

German electro-medieval band

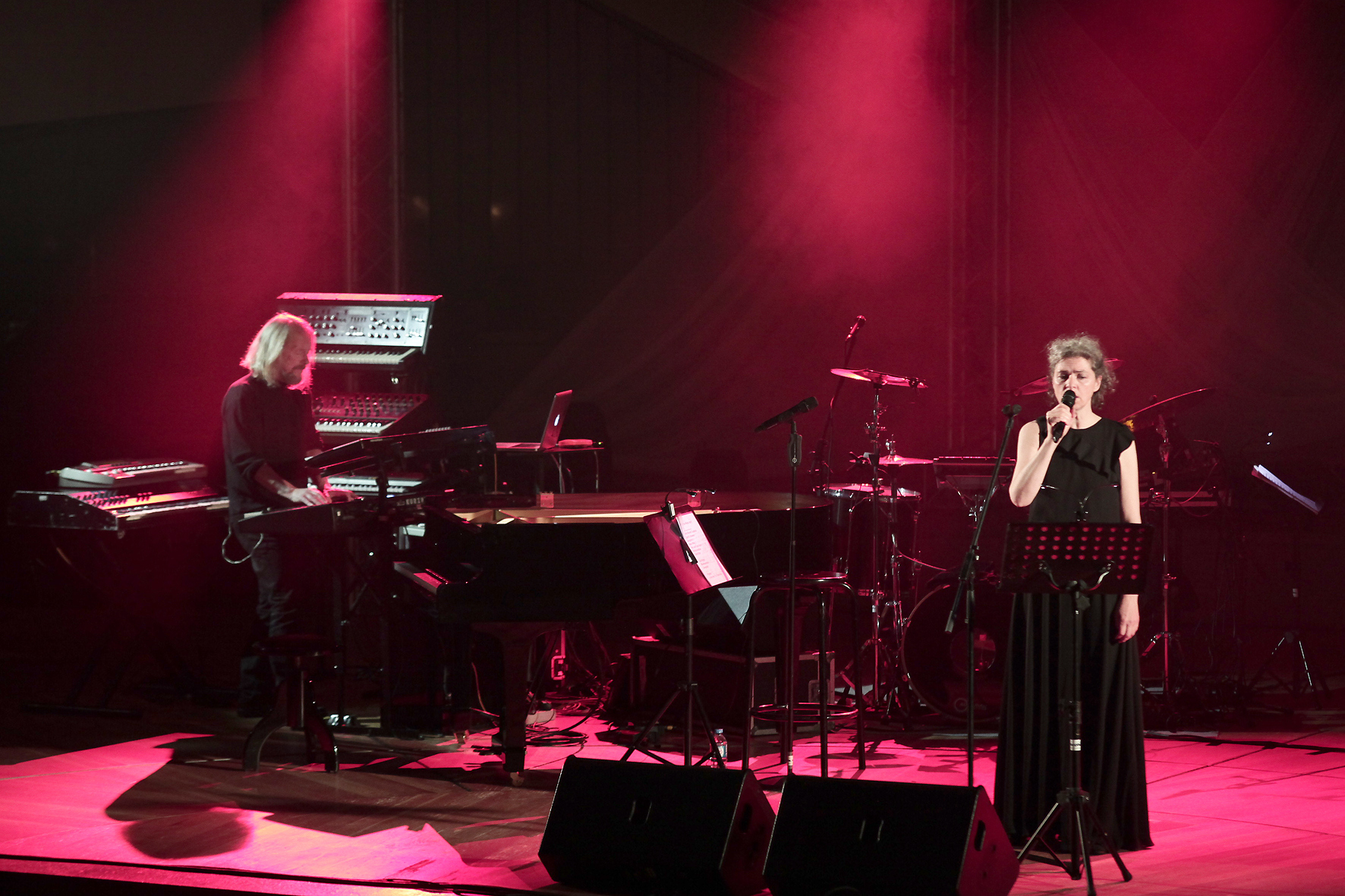
- Helium Vola performance at the Berliner Philharmonie within the framework of the XXX - The 30 Years-Tour of Deine Lakaien

Background information
- Origin: Germany
- Genres: Medieval-electronic, Avant-garde
- Years active: 2001–present
- Label: Chrom Records
- Members: Ernst Horn; Sabine Lutzenberger
- Website: helium-vola.de

Helium Vola is a German "electro-medieval" band founded in 2001 by Ernst Horn, who was also one of the founding members of Deine Lakaien and Qntal. Helium Vola interpret medieval lyrics in a modern, electronic soundscape. The music covers a broad range of styles from dance floor pop songs to forms adapted from classical music with an emphasis on ensemble pieces. The band is mainly a studio project. However, through the years a few live performances took place, most of them featuring the project's main vocalist Sabine Lutzenberger.

== Formation ==
The project was founded, when Ernst Horn was looking for a new way to pursue his idea of merging medieval poetry and music with contemporary musical approaches and modern subjects putting an emphasize on electronics. He felt a gap after leaving Qntal, because he loves the atmosphere of medieval poetry and music alike. In the contract with Chrom Records, Horn insisted on Helium Vola not being marketed as successor of Qntal. Another point was that Ernst Horn wanted to put a stronger focus on composition developing more complex song structures toward ensemble pieces, and to create his own electronic sounds. However, it was important for him to keep the simple but elegant and agile style of singing used today in the interpretation of medieval, or Early Music. Therefore, Horn started to search for a vocalist, a "main voice", for his new project, who specialized in this direction. He bought plenty compact discs from interprets of "Old Music" all over Europe and he considered himself lucky to be most captured by a singer living and working in Augsburg, a town close to Munich, where he lives himself.

Sabine Lutzenberger, working with the "Ensemble für frühe Musik Augsburg", the Ensemble Mala Punica, and the Huelgas Ensemble and a singer with already high reputation in this field of music, agreed to work with Horn intrigued by the opportunity to reach a different audience than usually with this project, now named "Helium Vola", aiming for a different audience. The name based on the noble gas that is lighter than air is supposed to reflect the playful idealism that Horn felt in connection with the project. Since "Helium" was already used as a name by a band, the Italian Vola meaning "fly" (in the imperative) was added.

Quickly, other voices for the ensemble pieces – Gerlinde Sämann (soprano), Susan Weiland (soprano), Andreas Hirtreiter (tenor), and Tobias Schlierf (bass) – and instrumentalists were found, and the first single "Omnis Mundi Creatura" was produced. All contributing musicians were and still are deeply embedded in the "classical" music scene. The title piece directly took off in the clubs of the scene and the project launched the debut album Helium Vola in 2001.

== Style ==
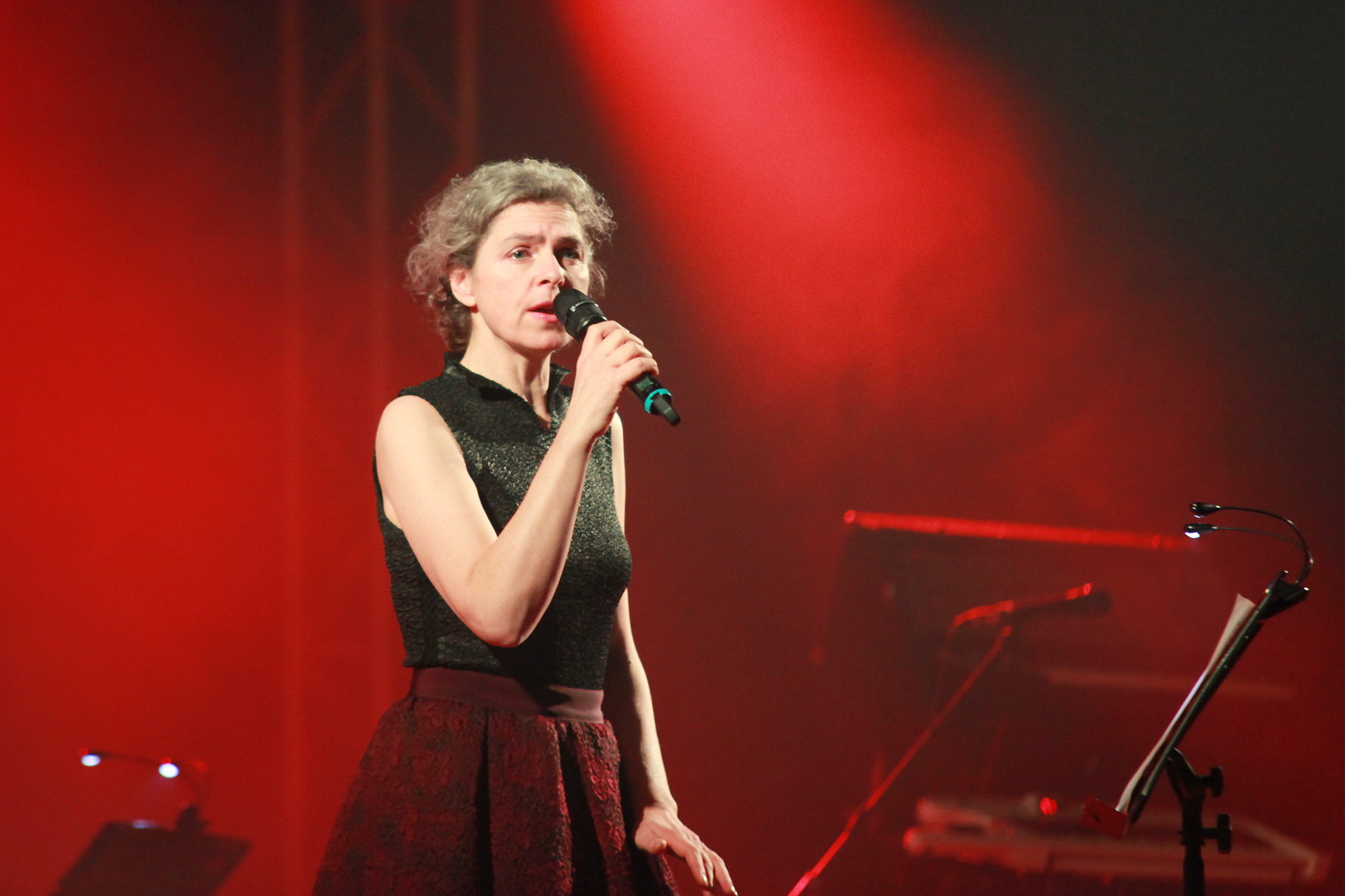
Sabine Lutzenberger, the "main voice" of Helium Vola

Like all succeeding albums, the debut is a concept album. Here, Horn connects the sinking of the Russian nuclear submarine Kursk in 2000 (the album is dedicated to the victims) and the reactions to this tragedy with songs about youth; its love and how older generations deal with the younger. The song structures are still following a rather "classical" pop scheme, which dissolves more and more in the following albums that feature more medieval madrigal-like or hymn-like styles in the pieces. Nevertheless, it already envisions the direction the project is going to take. Samples and electronic experiments are present, however often introduced in a subtle way. In this way they serve the deep thoughts and emotions Horn covers in a rich variety of facets with this project and that Lutzenberger communicates to the audience in as great variability as precision. The project is not meant to merely convey medieval music and memories. Horn rather wants to unravel the general quality of human life connecting thoughts and ideas of medieval poets with contemporary people.

The second album Liod followed in 2004 and has a more stringent concept than the debut. It tells the story of a woman who bears an illegitimate child, her fate and that of the child that seems to die at the beginning but survives due to a spell. Instrumental, electronic experimental samples form the thread through the album replacing the speech samples used in the first album. "Omnis mundi creatura" is prominently cited, and develops in kind of a leitmotiv like the theme of the song about "La fille aux cheveux noirs", a poem by Houellebecq, whose poetry is already featured on the debut.

The two subsequent albums Für Euch, die Ihr liebt and Wohin? are both double albums where ensemble pieces are given much more space than before. This development reaches a climax with the last piece on Wohin? in the style of ars subtilior. The samples and electronic experiments are not set apart anymore but fuse with the pieces. One very good example for this is the "Witwenklage" ("The widow's lament") on Wohin?.

== Lyrics ==
The lyrics of Helium Vola are created from medieval texts using a large variety of old languages comprising mainly Old High German, Middle High German, Latin, Galician, Provençal, and Italian. Here, Horn associates some languages with specific types of music, such as Provençal for love songs, while Latin appears strict and angular, and Old High German with its archaic character is combined with electronic experiments. His idea is not to follow strictly the medieval records but rather to emphasize general and timeless subjects as love, death, and nature, but also political questions. When the concept of the album demands it, Horn also adds lyrics written by himself or others in modern Italian, English and German. Sabine Lutzenberger contributed the song "DirIch" on Wohin?.

== Concerts ==
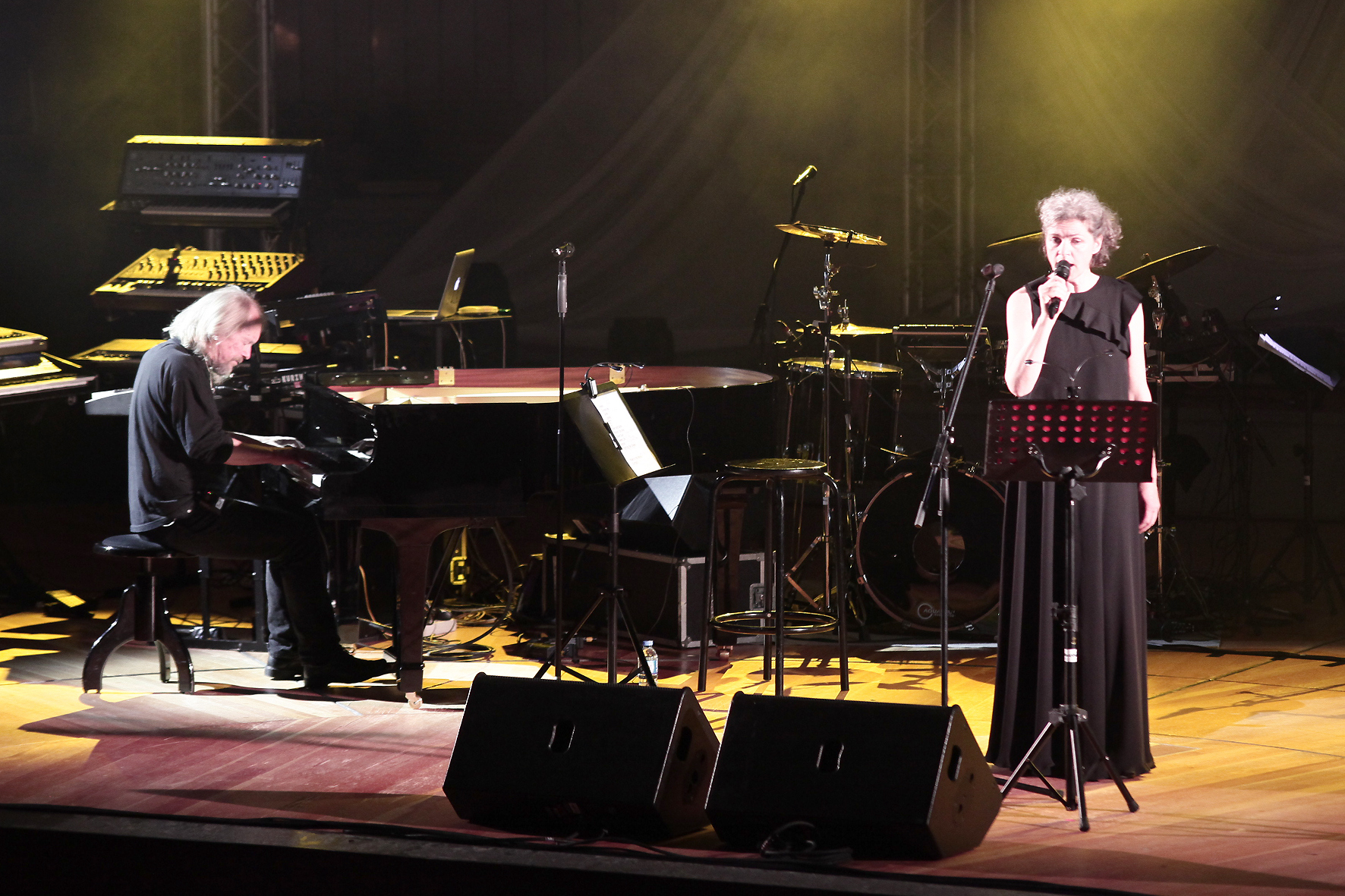
Helium Vola playing an acoustic set at the Berliner Philharmonie within the framework of the XXX - The 30 Years-Tour of Deine Lakaien

Live performances of Helium Vola are rare but enthusiastically celebrated by the fans. The whole ensemble performed on the WGT in 2002, where Joel Frederiksen, a renowned and highly appraised bass in renaissance and baroque music, joined the ensemble. Ernst Horn and Sabine Lutzenberger performed as Helium Vola twice on the Digital-Analogue-Festival Munich (2002, 2007). Together, they played a few Helium Vola songs within the framework of the XXX – The 30 Years Retrospective Tour of Deine Lakaien. Hannah Wagner, who joined the Helium Vola ensemble on the latest album Wohin?, usually performs a few Helium Vola pieces on the concerts of her own project, Saeldes Sanc, often accompanied by Ernst Horn.

== Discography ==
=== Albums ===
- Helium Vola (2001; some versions released with "Omnis Mundi Creatura" as bonus disc)
- Liod (2004)
- In lichter Farbe steht der Wald (EP, 2004)
- Für Euch, die Ihr liebt (2009)
- Wohin? (2013)

=== Singles ===
- "Omnis Mundi Creatura" (2001)
- "Veni Veni" (2004)
