= Liod =

Studio album by Helium Vola
- Released: April 26, 2004
- Genre: Darkwave
- Label: Chrom Records

Helium Vola chronology
Helium Vola (2001)	Liod (2004)	Für Euch, die Ihr liebt (2009)

Liod is a studio album by the electronic band Helium Vola. It was released in 2004 through Chrom Records.

== Track listing ==
1. "Liod-1" – 1:52
2. "Lucente Stella" – 2:56
3. "Liod-2" – 1:16
4. "Veni Veni – 6:10
5. "Bitte Um Trost" – 4:10
6. "Printemps" – 5:33
7. "Ich Was Ein Chint So Wolgetan" – 3:55
8. "Chumemin" – 5:11
9. "Mahnung" – 2:27
10. "Vagantenbeichte" – 5:04
11. "Frauenklage" – 4:29
12. "Ondas Do Mar" – 2:18
13. "Liod-3" – 1:02
14. "Zur Heilung" – 3:14
15. "Liod-4" – 1:20
16. "Engel" – 2:54
17. "Dormi" – 5:06
18. "La Fille" – 2:15
19. "Gegen Einen Dämon" – 2:20
20. "In Lichter Farbe Steht Der Wald" – 7:41

== Credits ==
- Cello – Jost Hecker
- Harp, Hurdy-gurdy – Riccardo Delfino
- Keyboards, producer – Ernst Horn
- Music by Ernst Horn (tracks: 1, 3 to 20)
- Photography, artwork by Tim Becker
- Vocals – Sabine Lutzenberger
- Additional vocals – Tobias Schlierff
