= Rebec =

String instrument

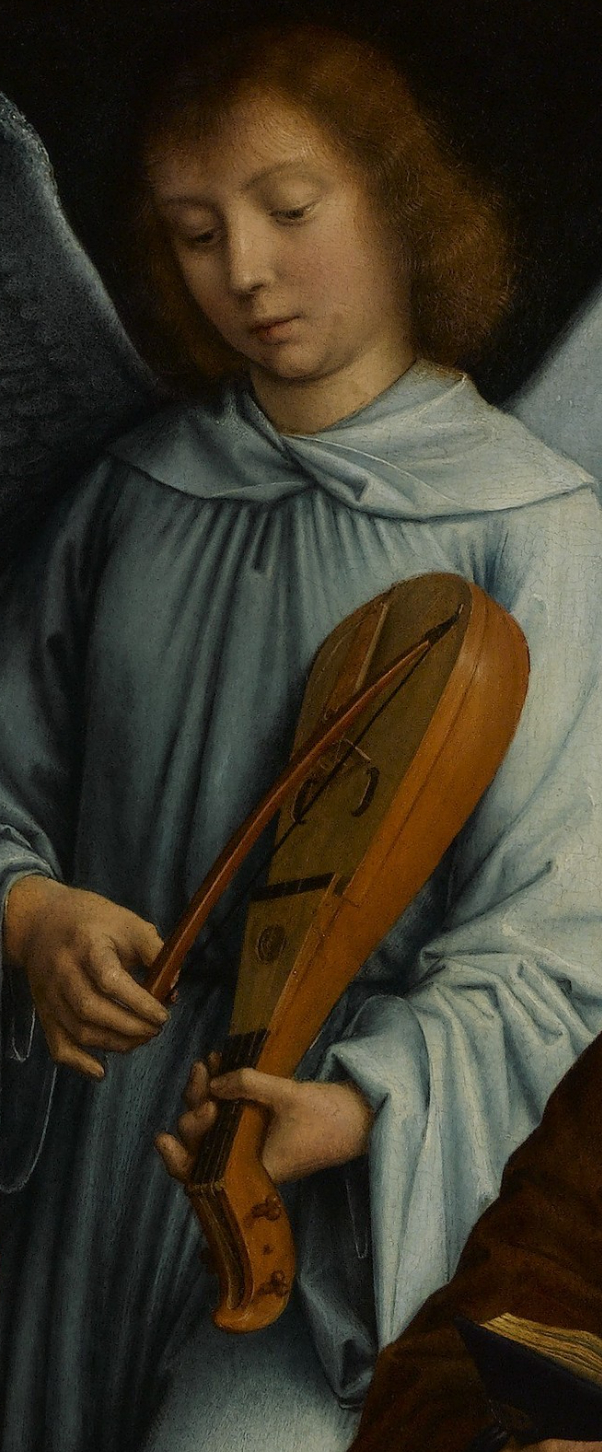
- The rebec in "Virgin among Virgins" (1509), by Gerard David.

String instrument
- Classification: Bowed string instruments
- Hornbostel–Sachs classification: 321.21-71 (Bowl lyre sounded by a bow)
- Developed: Middle Ages

Related instruments
- Vielle; Viol; Rebab; Rabel; Rabeca; Byzantine lyra

The rebec (sometimes rebecha, rebeckha, and other spellings, pronounced /ˈriːbɛk/ or /ˈrɛbɛk/) is a bowed stringed instrument of the Middle Ages and the early Renaissance. In its most common form, it has a narrow boat-shaped body and one to five strings.

== Origins ==
Popular from the 13th to 16th centuries, the introduction of the rebec into Western Europe coincided with the Arabic conquest of the Iberian Peninsula. There is, however, evidence of the existence of bowed instruments in the 9th century in Eastern Europe. The Persian geographer of the 9th century Ibn Khurradadhbih cited the bowed Byzantine lira (or lyra) as a typical bowed instrument of the Byzantines and equivalent to the pear-shaped Arab rebab.

The rebec was adopted as a key instrument in Arab classical music and in Morocco it was used in the tradition of Arabo-Andalusian music, which had been kept alive by descendants of Muslims who left Spain as refugees following the Reconquista. The rebec also became a favorite instrument in the tea houses of the Ottoman Empire.

The rebec was first referred to by that name around the beginning of the 14th century, though as mentioned above the Byzantine lira had been played since around the 9th century. The name derives from the 15th century Middle French rebec, altered in an unexplained manner from the 13th century Old French ribabe, which in turn comes from the Arabic rebab. An early form of the rebec is also referred to as the rubeba in a 13th-century Moravian treatise on music. Medieval sources refer to the instrument by several other names, including kit and the generic term fiddle.

A distinguishing feature of the rebec is that the bowl (or body) of the instrument is carved from a solid piece of wood. This distinguishes it from the later period vielles and gambas known in the Renaissance.

== Tuning ==
The number of strings on the rebec varies from one to five,although three is the most common number. Early forms of the instrument commonly had two. The strings are often tuned in fifths, although this tuning is not universal. Many depictions of the rebec show its bridge as flat, which would mean that several strings were bowed at the same time. This suggests that the strings would likely be tuned in fifths and fourths similar to the fiddle and mandora. The instrument was originally in the treble range, like the violin, but later larger versions were developed, so that by the 16th century composers were able to write pieces for consorts of rebecs, just as they did for consorts of viols.

== In use ==
The rebec was often played by professional minstrels and musicians at feasts. In northern Europe, musicians typically held it at the shoulder, while musicians in southern Europe and northern Africa held it down in the lap and gripped the bow from below.

The use of frets on the rebec is somewhat ambiguous. Many scholars who have written about the instrument have described it as fretless. However, some illustrations from the 13th century onward depict frets on the rebec. It is possible to attribute this discrepancy to the fact that frets on bowed instruments appeared in Europe in the early renaissance, but not in England until the 15th century.

In time, the viol came to replace the rebec, and the instrument was little used beyond the renaissance period. The instrument was used by dance masters until the 18th century, however, often being used for the same purpose as the kit, a small pocket-sized violin. The rebec also remained in use in folk music, especially in eastern Europe and Spain. Andalusi nubah, a genre of music from North Africa, often includes the rebec. Chilote Waltz (a variation of traditional waltz, played in Chiloe Island, Chile) also uses the rebec. The name "Rabeca" was used to designate bowed instruments in the Portuguese language akin to "fiddle", prior to the ascension of the term "violin" in the 20th century. The rebec remains played in folk music of both Portugal and Brazil.

== Artists ==
- The original Michael Nyman Band included a rebec before the band switched to a fully amplified lineup.
- Les Cousins Branchaud, a folk music group from Quebec, Canada, includes a rebec player.
- Ensemble Micrologus, an Italian medieval music group, has a member who performs on rebec.
- Tina Chancey is a multi-instrumentalist specializing in early bowed strings like the rebec. She also plays in Hesperus, an early music and folk music group.
- Dominique Regef is a French musician, composer and improvisor who performs on, among other instruments, the rebec.
- Giles Lewin, while being more famous for his work on violin and bagpipes, also plays the rebec in the Dufay Collective.
- Sisters Shirley and Dolly Collins have released a number of albums that include the rebec.
- Oni Wytars, a European music group, often includes the rebec in their performances.
- Sérgio Roberto Veloso de Oliveira (from Mestre Ambrósio and Siba e a Fuloresta), and Antônio Nóbrega plays the rebec in a very Brazilian folkloric way, which has a large number of players in its north-east part.
- A rebec, played by Shira Kammen, is used in the song "Kingfisher" on the 2010 album Have One On Me by American multi-instrumentalist Joanna Newsom.
- Fractio Modi, a medieval music group based in Brisbane, Australia, has a member who performs on rebec.
- Percival, a Polish folk metal band from Lubin, uses the rebec performed by Katarzyna Bromirska in many of their songs, leaning into a Slavic folkloric sound.

== In popular culture ==
Hugh Rebeck is a minor character in William Shakespeare's Romeo and Juliet, one of the musicians called by Peter in an oft-cut scene. Presumably, he is named for the instrument that he plays.

In a scene in Don Quixote, a goatherd entertains Don Quixote and Sancho Panza by playing a rebec and singing a love song.

A rebec featured prominently in one of Ellis Peters' (12th century) Brother Cadfael stories: Liliwin, the title character of The Sanctuary Sparrow, earned his living by playing that instrument. His rebec was damaged by a mob that accused him of murder, but one of the monks repaired it and returned to him at the end of the story.

In Charles-Valentin Alkan's Concerto for Solo Piano (Op. 39 No. 8-10), "Quasi-ribeche" is a unique performance marking that appears early in the third movement (Allegretto alla barbaresca) and references the sound of the rebec and appears in a "Tutti" section, where the soloist emulates the sound of an orchestra in a piano.

== See also ==
- Byzantine lyra: the pear-shaped bowed stringed instrument of the Byzantine Empire.
- Calabrian lira
- Cretan lyra: The pear-shaped bowed instrument of Crete, Greece.
- Dramyin: a Himalayan folk music instrument.
- Gadulka: a Bulgarian stringed instrument.
- Gusle: a Western Balkan folk instrument
- Kamencheh: a four-stringed instrument similar to the kemenche.
- Kemenche: a three-stringed instrument from the Black Sea region of Asia Minor.
- Lijerica Croatian or Dalmatian instrument
- Rabeca
- Rabel: a Spanish folk instrument
- Rebecca (disambiguation)
