= Wohin? (album) =

Studio album by Helium Vola
- Released: February 22, 2013
- Genre: Darkwave
- Label: Chrom Records

Helium Vola chronology
Für Euch, die Ihr liebt (2009)	Wohin? (2013)

Wohin? is a double-CD studio album released by electro-medieval/darkwave band Helium Vola. It was released February 22, 2013 by Chrom Records.

== Track listing ==
=== CD1 ===
1. "Nubibus Atris" – 3:05
2. "Uf Der Linden" – 4:01
3. "A Virgen Santa Maria" – 4:12
4. "Witwenklage – 6:32
5. "Tanderadan" – 5:11
6. "Fama Tuba2" – 5:14
7. "E Raynauz, Amis" – 6:07
8. "Ich Will Den Sumer Gruezen" – 4:25
9. "Die Andre" – 5:52
10. "Napuctun Speaks" – 11:22

=== CD2 ===
1. "The Unquiet Grave" – 7:38
2. "Heja, Wie Sie Sang" – 4:46
3. "Amor, M'à Posto" – 5:48
4. "Rose Am Dorn" – 4:01
5. "Excalibur" – 5:22
6. "Dirlch" – 6:24
7. "Panzer Hymnus" – 6:06
8. "Diu Werlt Was Gelf" – 4:47
9. "Aquil Altera" – 15:02

== Credits ==
- Artwork by - Bettina Stickel
- Composed by Ernst Horn (tracks: 1-1 to 2-5, 2-7 to 2-9)
- Coordinator [Promotion and Product Coordination] - Sandra Eichner
- Keyboards, Producer - Ernst Horn
- Mastered by Christoph Stickel
- Translated by [English] Heike Riou
- Vocals - Sabine Lutzenberger
- Vocals - Hannah Wagner
