= In lichter Farbe steht der Wald =

EP by Helium Vola
- Released: November 22, 2004
- Genre: Darkwave
- Length: 32:30
- Label: Chrom

In lichter Farbe steht der Wald is an EP released by electro-medieval/darkwave band Helium Vola. It was released November 22, 2004 by Chrom Records.

== Track listing ==
1. "In Lichter Farbe Steht Der Wald (Club-mix)" – 7:09
2. "Dies Ire" – 6:18
3. "Omnia Sol Temperat" – 4:03
4. "Hold On" – 4:25
5. "Carmen Ad Deum" – 5:06
6. "In Lichter Farbe Steht Der Wald (Lied-Version)" – 5:29

== Credits ==
- Guitar - Robert Wilcocks
- Harp - Uschi Lear
- Hurdy-gurdy - Riccardo Delfino
- Producer, keyboards - Ernst Horn
- Vocals - Andreas Hirtreiter (tracks: 1, 5, 6), Gerlinde Sämann (tracks: 1, 5, 6), Joel Frederiksen (tracks: 1, 2, 6), Sabine Lutzenberger, Susan Weiland (tracks: 1, 5, 6), Tobias Schlierff (tracks: 5)
