= April Skies (album) =

Studio album by Deine Lakaien
- Released: March 14, 2005
- Genres: Darkwave, avant-garde, electronic
- Length: 57:51
- Label: Capitol

Deine Lakaien chronology
Live in Concert (2003)	April Skies (2005)	Indicator (2010)

April Skies is the 8th studio album by the electronic band Deine Lakaien. It was released in 2005.

== Track listing ==
1. "Over and Done" – 5:12
2. "Slowly Comes My Night" – 4:24
3. "Secret Hideaway" – 4:19
4. "Supermarket (My Angel)" – 5:23
5. "Midnight Sun" – 4:25
6. "Satellite" – 4:43
7. "Take a Chance" – 4:53
8. "Heart Made to Be Mine" – 4:01
9. "Vivre" – 5:39
10. "When You Lose" – 3:52
11. "Through the Hall" – 6:09
12. "Dialectic" – 4:34
13. "Falling" (bonus track, only on ltd. Edition)

== Guest musicians ==
B. Deutung, Ivee Leon, Sharifa, Robert Wilcocks

== Issues with CD ==
The cd April Skies released on Capital-EMI contains cd Copying Protection, many people have found that this cd will not play on their car cd-players or in certain stereos. Further, in order to play on ones computer, the cd insists on installing its own sub-par cd-player software. Attempts to "crack" the software have received little success. This copy-protection which prevents purchasers from putting the music onto the MP3 player has caused a fan backlash against EMI records with many websites dedicated to people ranting about this problem."Statement of the band (in German)". Archived from the original on August 17, 2005.
