= Indication =

Indication may refer to:

- A synonym for sign
- Human interface, highlighting the single object pointed to as a cursor is moved, without any other user action such as clicking, is indication
- Indication (medicine), a valid reason to use a certain test, medication, procedure, or surgery

== See also ==
- Indicator (disambiguation)
