= Rabel (instrument) =

Spanish bowed stringed instrument

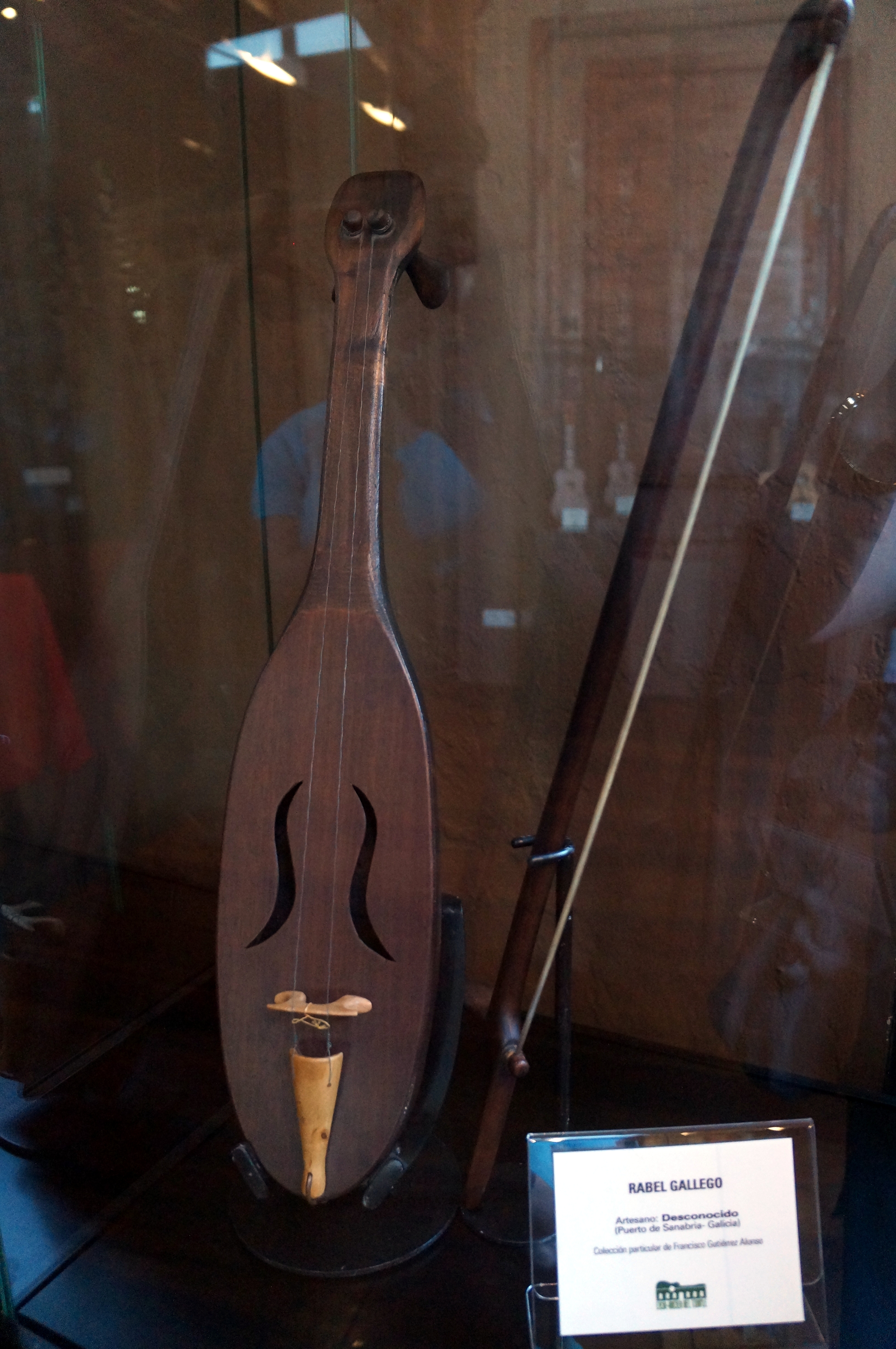
- Galician Rabel

String instrument
- Classification: String instrument
- Hornbostel–Sachs classification: (Composite chordophone)

Related instruments
- Rebec, Rabeca

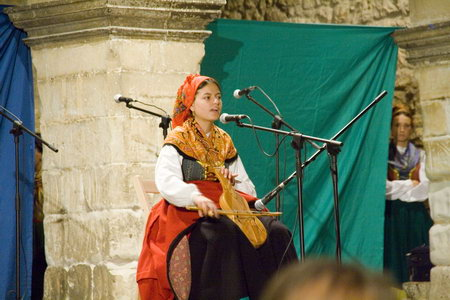
Rabelista (Rabel player)

The rabel (or arrabel, robel, rovel) is a bowed stringed instrument from Spain, a rustic folk-fiddle descended from the medieval rebec, with both perhaps descended from the Arab rabab. The instrument generally has two or three strings of gut or steel, or sometimes twisted horse-hair. The instrument is first mentioned in the 12th century, and it is still used in parts of Latin America, as well as the Spanish provinces of Cantabria and Asturias.

The rebel is often associates with secular instrumental music, and the most common rabel used in the Middles ages was the soprano.

== See also ==
- Rebec
