= Omnis Mundi Creatura =

2001 single by Helium Vola

Single by Helium Vola
- Released: 2001
- Genre: Darkwave
- Length: 19:35
- Label: Chrom Records
- Songwriters: Traditional, Ernest Horn

Helium Vola singles chronology
| "Omnis Mundi Creatura" (2001) | "Veni Veni" (2004) |

Omnis Mundi Creatura is a single released by electro-medieval/darkwave band Helium Vola. It was released in 2001 by Chrom Records.

The lyrics of the song are entirely in Latin. They are copied from a 12th-century text by the neo-Platonist Alain de Lille:

Omnis mundi creatura quasi liber et pictura nobis est in speculum: nostrae vitae, nostrae mortis, nostri status, nostrae sortis fidele signaculum.

[All the world's creatures, as a book and a picture, are to us as a mirror: in it our life, our death, our present condition and our passing are faithfully signified.]

== Track listing ==
1. "Omnis Mundi Creatura (Album Version)" – 6:06
2. "Minne Und Treue" – 4:44
3. "Fama Tuba" – 4:36
4. "Omnis Mundi Creatura (Radio Version)" – 4:09

== Credits ==
- Ernst Horn - Keyboards & production
- Sabine Lutzenberger - vocals
- Additional singers - Gerlinde Sämann, Susan Weiland, Andreas Hirtreiter, Tobias Schlierf
- Lyrics - Traditional
- Composed by Ernst Horn
