= Qntal II =

Studio album by Qntal
- Released: 1995
- Genre: Dark wave; electronic; neoclassical dark wave; Medieval music
- Length: 53:52
- Label: Chrom Records, Noir

Qntal chronology
Qntal I (1992)	Qntal II (1995)	Qntal III: Tristan und Isolde (2003)

Qntal II is the second album of the German dark wave band Qntal, released in 1995. It features lyrics by Walther von der Vogelweide and other medieval songs combined with modern electronic sound.

The album was re-released by Noir Records in 2007.

== Track listing ==
No.	Title	Length
1.	"Introitus"	1:03
2.	"Palästinalied"	5:59
3.	"Frühling"	5:08
4.	"Hymni Nocturnales"	5:08
5.	"Vos Attestor"	5:23
6.	"Herbst"	4:12
7.	"Abaelard"	5:40
8.	"Virgo Splendens"	5:40
9.	"Trobar Clus"	5:11
10.	"Sine Nomine"	2:14
11.	"Ab Vox D'angel"	6:17
12.	"Epilog"	2:04
