= Indicatrix =

Indicatrix may refer to:

== Differential geometry ==
- Dupin indicatrix, a conic section which describes the local shape of a surface
- Tissot's indicatrix, which describes and visualizes the distortion of a map
- Tangent indicatrix, an object in differential geometry related to a closed space curve

== Optics ==
- Indicatrix, a special case of the index ellipsoid in the study of crystals and refractive indices

== See also ==
- Indicator, the more common masculine form of the word
