= White Lies (Deine Lakaien album) =

Studio album by Deine Lakaien
- Released: January 2, 2002
- Genre: Experimental, avant-garde, classical
- Length: 57:51
- Label: Chrom Records

Deine Lakaien chronology
Kasmodiah (1999)	White Lies (2002)	1987 (2003)

White Lies is the seventh studio album released by the group Deine Lakaien, released in 2002.

== Track listing ==
1. "Wunderbar" – 4:15
2. "Generators" – 4:45
3. "Where You Are" – 4:10
4. "Prayer" – 4:57
5. "Stupid" – 3:46
6. "Kiss" – 4:00
7. "Silence in Your Eyes" – 4:37
8. "Hands White" – 5:52
9. "Lost" – 5:59
10. "Fleeting" – 4:05
11. "Life is a Sexually Transmitted Disease" – 5:03
12. "One Minus One" – 4:44

=== Double LP bonus tracks ===
1. "May Be" – 4:12
2. "Generators (Whitemix)" – 3:58
3. "Life Is (Single Version)" – 4:04
4. "Generators (Club Version)" – 4:51

== Remixes ==
1. "Where You Are (VNV Nation Remix)" - 5:04
