= Kasmodiah =

Studio album by Deine Lakaien
- Released: 1999
- Genre: Electronica; Dark wave
- Length: 56:31

Deine Lakaien chronology
Winter Fish Testosterone (1996)	Kasmodiah (1999)	White Lies (2002)

Kasmodiah is an album written by Deine Lakaien. It was released in 1999.

== Track listing ==
1. "Intro" – 0:45
2. "Return" – 4:24
3. "Kiss The Future" – 4:06
4. "My Shadows" – 4:39
5. "Into My Arms" – 5:21
6. "Overpaid" – 3:34
7. "Venus Man" – 4:06
8. "The Game" – 4:24
9. "Kasmodiah" – 3:52
10. "Lass mich" – 4:46
11. "Sometimes" – 4:35
12. "Fight" – 5:36
13. "Try" – 6:23
