= Qntal I =

Studio album by Qntal
- Released: 1992
- Genre: Dark wave; electronic; neoclassical dark wave; Medieval music
- Length: 53:56
- Label: Chrom Records, Noir

Qntal chronology
Qntal I (1992)	Qntal II (1995)

Qntal I is the debut album of the German dark wave band Qntal.

The album features a mix of medieval lyrics in languages like Latin, Middle High German and Middle French combined with electronic music of the late 1980s Dark Scene.

In 2007 it was re-released on Noir Records.

== Track listing ==
No.	Title	Length
1.	"Un Vers de Dreyt Nien"	2:22
2.	"Ad Mortem Festinamus"	6:09
3.	"Anc Non Lo Vi"	0:52
4.	"Por Mau Tens"	4:16
5.	"Floris e Blanchaflor"	5:22
6.	"Unter Der Linden"	3:44
7.	"Rossinhol"	4:52
8.	"Non Sofre Santa Maria"	4:27
9.	"Doussa Res"	4:43
10.	"Jherusalem"	3:54
11.	"Sanctus"	2:25
12.	"Black Death"	10:58
