= Indicator lamp =

An indicator lamp (or indicator light) is an illuminated device that is intended to visually convey a single status to the user of a piece of equipment.

Indicator lamp may refer to:

- Direction indicator light, a turn signal in automotive lighting
- Check engine light, a tell-tale warning light in automobiles
- Tell-tale (automotive), a more generic class of indicators
- A specific style of indicator light fixture or component, such as a:
  - Neon glow lamp, a miniature gas-discharge lamp
  - Digitron / cold cathode display / Nixie tube, an electronic device used for displaying numerals or other information using glow discharge
  - Light-emitting diode

== See also ==
- Search Wiktionary for indicator lamp or indicator light
