= Adaro (band) =

German medieval folk rock band

- Genres: Medieval folk rock, ethereal wave
- Years active: 1997–2006
- Members: Christoph Pelgen; Konstanze Kulinsky; Jürgen Treyz; Henrik Mumm; Jörg Bielfeldt
- Past members: Davide Piai (Ulli) Ulrich Stotz

Adaro was a German medieval folk rock band active from 1997 to 2006.

== Style ==
While their first CD, Stella Splendens, was based mainly on Spanish songs from the 13th and 14th century, the later works incorporated late medieval songs from the Minnesang tradition by artists such as Hans Sachs, Walther von der Vogelweide and Oswald von Wolkenstein.

The album Minnenspiel (2002) has been lauded for being a fresh, original work in the Mittelalter rock genre featuring very melodic and modern sound structures. The German Sonic Seducer magazine noted the contrast between the clear Heavenly Voices style of singer Konstanze Kulinsky and Christoph Pelgen's smooth male vocals, as well as the perfect mastering of the instruments on this record.

The 2004 album Words never spoken - Extended Edition which includes the tracks of the Words never spoken EP (1999) was noted to have a rather light style reminiscent of Pop rock.

== Discography ==
- 1997: Stella Splendens (Akku Disk)
- 1999: Words never spoken (EP, Akku Disk)
- 2002: Minnenspiel (SPV)
- 2004: Schlaraffenland (Inside Out)
- 2004: Words never spoken - Extended Edition (Inside Out)
