= Siba (singer) =

Brazilian singer (born 1969)

Sérgio Roberto Veloso de Oliveira (born Recife, 16 February 1969), known as Siba, is a popular Brazilian folk-rock singer and songwriter. Sergio Veloso, or Siba, founded the band Mestre Ambrósio which was popular in the 1990s. After 2000 he turned to folk music with the band Fuloresta, backed by traditional brass musicians, and then in the late 2000s to experimental and electric music with Avante (2012). In 2015 Siba returned to more political themes with De Baile Solto. His album Coruja Muda was considered one of the 25 best Brazilian albums of the second half of 2019 by the São Paulo Association of Art Critics.

== Discography ==
with band Mestre Ambrósio

- 1996 - Mestre Ambrósio
- 1997 - pt:Fuá na casa de Cabral
- 1999 - pt:Baião de Viramundo - Tributo a Luiz Gonzaga
- 1999 - Songbook de Chico Buarque
- 2001 - pt:Terceiro Samba

Solo and collaboration

- 2002 - Fuloresta Fuloresta do Samba
- 2003 - Barachinha No Baque Solto Somente
- 2007 - Fuloresta Toda Vez Que eu Dou Um Passo o Mundo Sai do Lugar
- 2009 - Fuloresta Canoa Furada (EP)
- 2009 - Roberto Corrêa "Violas de Bronze"
- 2012 - Siba Avante
- 2015 - Siba De Baile Solto
