= Joel Frederiksen =

German opera singer

Joel Frederiksen is an American bass singer and lutenist based in Germany, and director of the early music Ensemble Phoenix Munich. He has released award-winning CDs with Harmonia Mundi France and Sony/Deutsche Harmonia Mundi. He studied for a master's degree in Early Music at Oakland University where he was the recipient of numerous awards including "Distinguished Musicianship", "Matilda Award" and the "Distinguished Alumni Achievement Award". From 1990 to 1999 while living in New York City he was a member of the Waverly Consort and the Boston Camerata.

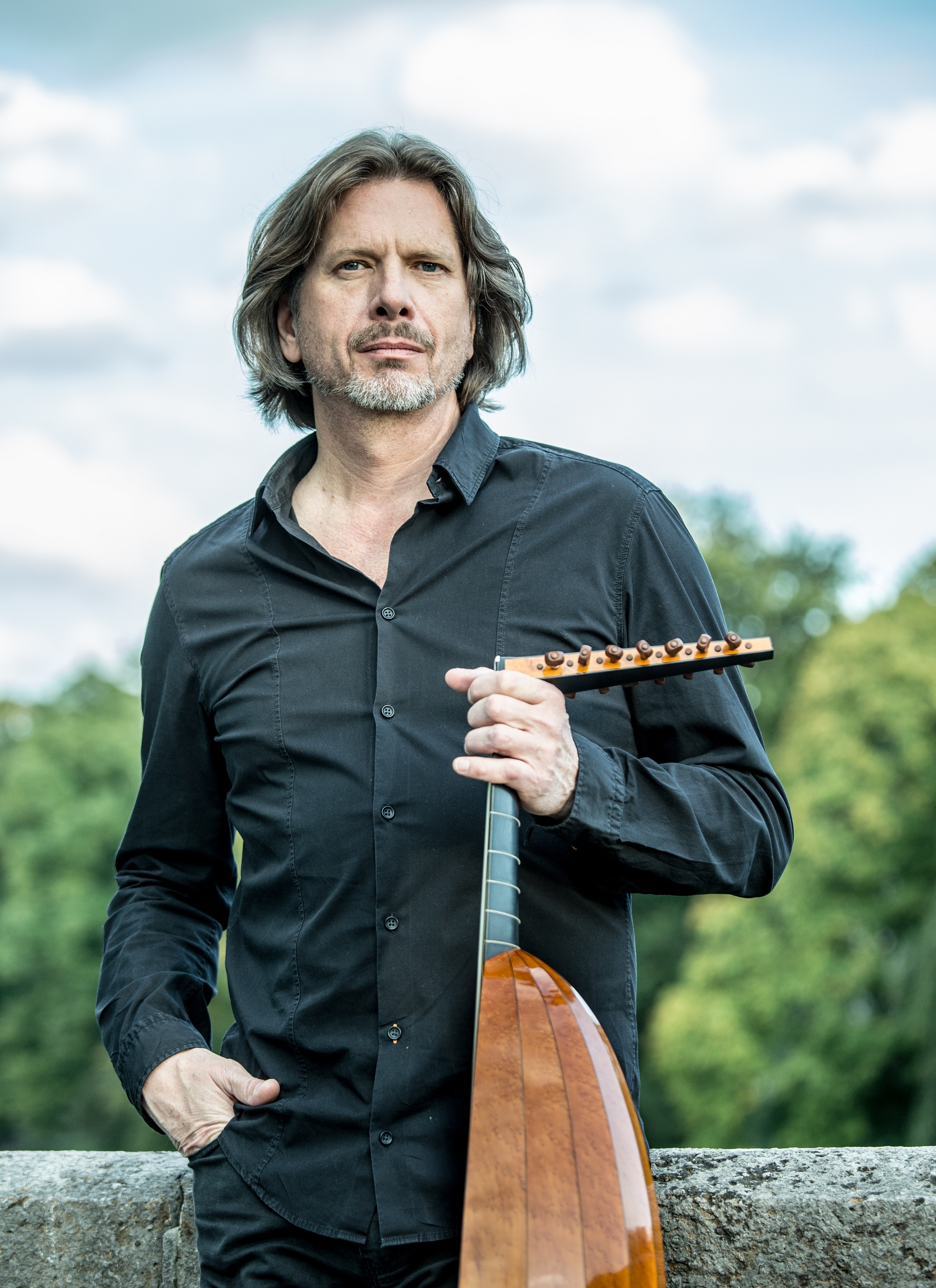
Joel Frederiksen

== Discography with Ensemble Phoenix Munich, Joel Frederiksen, Director ==
- A Day with Suzanne - A Tribute to Leonard Cohen with French Renaissance Chanson (Sony/Deutsche Harmonia Mundi, January 13, 2023)
- Walther von der Vogelweide - Courtly Songs of the Middle Ages (Sony/Deutsche Harmonia Mundi, May 2023)
- Un niño nos es naçido: A Child for us is born - Christmas music of Spain and Latin America from the 16th and 17th centuries (Sony/DHM November 2018)
- Tell me true love - Music of John Dowland (Sony/DHM October 2016)
- Reflektionen - New Interpretations of Oswald von Wolkenstein (Sony/DHM April 2013)
- Requiem for a Pink Moon: An Elizabethan Tribute to Nick Drake (1948-1974) (Harmonia Mundi France May 2012) (ECHO Klassik 2013)
- Rose of Sharon: 100 Years of American Music 1770-1870 (Harmonia Mundi France May 2011)
- O felice morire: Aria & Madrigali - Firenze, 1600 - Music for bass by Caccini, Kapsberger, Monteverdi (Harmonia Mundi France August 2008)
- The Elfin Knight: Ballads and Dances from Renaissance England (Harmonia Mundi France 2007/ Harmonia Mundi France GOLD 2018)
- Orpheus, I am: English, French, and Italian Music from the Renaissance and Early Baroque (EPM Productions 2003)
