= Alexander Veljanov =

Macedonian singer

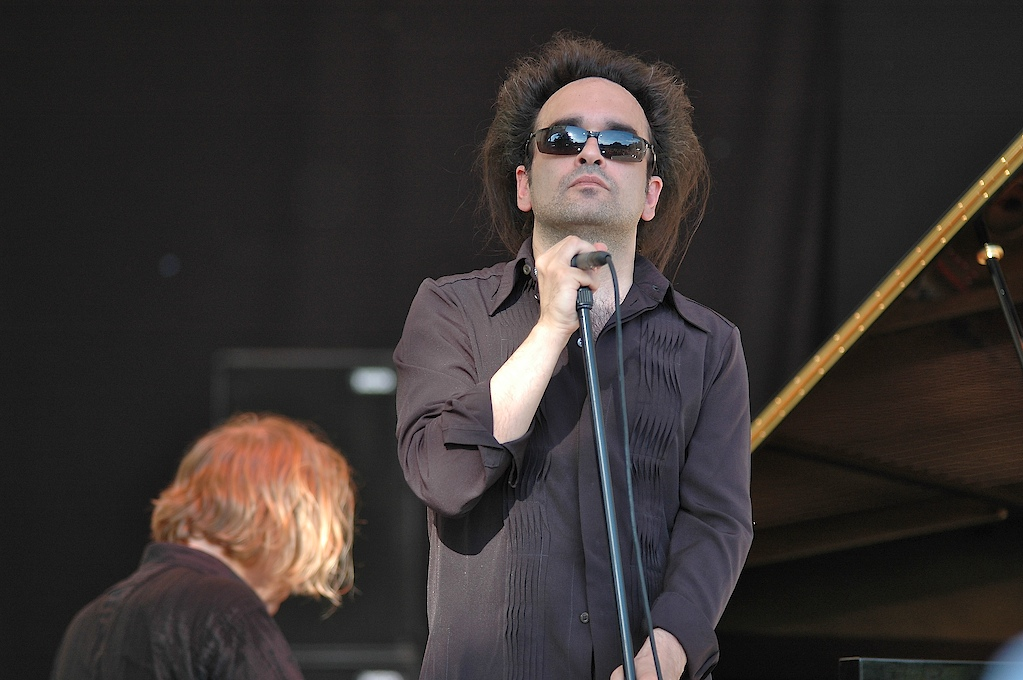
- Veljanov performing with Ernst Horn (background) in 2007.

Background information
- Born: 1964 or 1965 (age 60–61)
- Origin: North Macedonia
- Occupations: Singer, songwriter
- Years active: 1985 - present
- Member of: Deine Lakaien
- Formerly of: Run Run Vanguard
- Website: http://veljanov.de

Alexander Veljanov (Macedonian: Александар Вељанов, [alɛksˈandar ˈvɛljanɔf]) is a Macedonian singer. He became famous through singing in the darkwave band Deine Lakaien which he founded with Ernst Horn in 1985.

== Biography ==
Veljanov studied theatre and film in Munich and Berlin. He interrupted his studies in 1991 to fully concentrate on music, especially Deine Lakaien. Until 1993 he was a member of the rock band Run Run Vanguard. He is active as a singer and songwriter not only for Deine Lakaien, but also for several side and solo projects. During his career, he has performed as a guest singer with many other artists and bands as well.

Alexander Veljanov has lived and worked in Berlin, Munich and London. He guards his private life very carefully; in interviews, he rarely speaks about himself and the year of his birth remains a mystery. Nonetheless, in the interview to Swiss on-line magazine Art-Noir on 23 February 2011, he mentioned that "he is now 46".

His latest album Porta Macedonia has covered and sampled songs from the iconic Macedonian group Mizar.

== Solo discography ==
=== Run Run Vanguard ===
- 1993: Run Run Vanguard - Suck Success (Album)

=== Alexander Veljanov ===
- 1998: Veljanov - Secrets of the Silver Tongue (Album)
- 1998: Veljanov - The Man With a Silver Gun (Mini CD)
- 1998: Veljanov - Past and Forever (Mini CD)
- 2001: Veljanov - The Sweet Life (Album)
- 2001: Veljanov - Fly Away (Mini CD)
- 2006: Veljanov - Kaleidoscope: A Singles Collection (Compilation)
- 2008: Veljanov - Nie mehr/Königin aus Eis (Mini CD)
- 2008: Veljanov - Porta Macedonia (Album)

=== Collaborations ===
- 1991: The Perc Meets the Hidden Gentleman - Lavender (Album), "The Composition of Incense"
- 1993: Das Holz - contribution to "The Lizard King: A Tribute to Jim Morrison Wave & Electro Cover Versionen", "Spanish Caravan"
- 1994: Estampie - Ludus Danielis (Album), "Abacuc"
- 1995: Sleeping Dogs Wake - Hold me under the Stars (MCD), "Hold me"
- 1996: Estampie - Crusaders (Album), "Ahi, amors", "Chaterai por mon corage", "Imperator Rex Greacorum", "Maugréz tous sainz", "Palästinalied", "Quant amors trobet partir"
- 1998: Das Holz - Drei (Album), "Alice" + "Jolene"
- 2000: Estampie - Ondas (Album), "O Fortuna"
- 2002: Stendal Blast - "Nur ein Tag" (MCD)
- 2004: Schiller - Leben (Album), with "Desire"
- 2006: Edgar Allan Poe Projekt - Visionen (Double Album CD2), with "Lied Für Annabel Lee"
