= Indicator (Deine Lakaien album) =

Studio album by Deine Lakaien
- Released: 2010
- Genres: Experimental, avant-garde, dark wave, electronic
- Labels: Chrom Records, Ministry of Sound

Deine Lakaien chronology
| April Skies (2005) | Indicator (2010) | Acoustic II (2013) |

Indicator is the ninth studio album released by the group Deine Lakaien, released in 2010.

== Track listing ==
1. "One Night"
2. "Who`ll Save Your World"
3. "Gone"
4. "Immigrant"
5. "Blue Heart"
6. "Europe"
7. "Along Our Road"
8. "Without Your Words"
9. "Six O'Clock"
10. "Go Away Bad Dreams"
11. "On Your Stage Again"
12. "The Old Man Is Dead"
