= Deine Lakaien =

German musical project

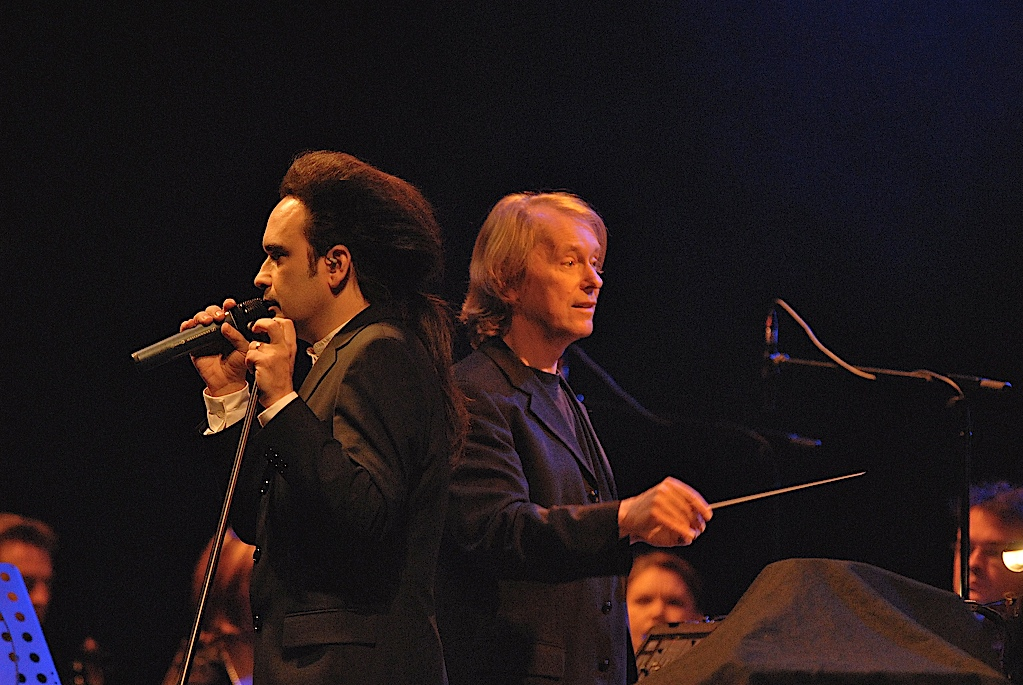
- Alexander Veljanov (left), Ernst Horn (right) performing with the Neue Philharmonie Frankfurt in Berlin, 19 February 2007

Background information
- Origin: Germany
- Genres: Avant-garde, electronic, neoclassical, dark wave
- Years active: 1985–present
- Labels: Chrom, Indigo, Columbia/Sony Music, Capitol, EMI, Prophecy
- Members: Principal: Alexander Veljanov (vocals); Ernst Horn (instruments); Other: Goran Trajkoski (since 2014): E-guitar, electronics, back up vocalist; Slobodan Kajkut (since 2014): drums
- Past members: Other Christian „Komo“ Komorowski (1991–1999): violin Michael Popp (1991–2001): E-guitar, medieval instruments Robert Wilcocks (2002–2011): E-guitar: Tobias „B. Deutung“ Unterberg (since 2002): cello; Yvonne „Ivee Leon“ Fechner (since 2002): violin, back up vocalist; Katharina „Sharifa“ Garrard (since 2002): violin, back up vocalist
- Website: http://www.deine-lakaien.com/

Deine Lakaien is a German band project active since 1985. It is formed by the vocalist Alexander Veljanov and by the composer and multi-instrumentalist Ernst Horn. The group unites influences from dark wave with pop music and elements of avant-garde.

== History ==
=== The beginning (1985–1989) ===
Deine Lakaien was founded in 1985 by Ernst Horn and Alexander Veljanov. Ernst Horn had just quit his position as a conductor at the Statestheater of Baden in Karlsruhe, while keeping his freelance work as pianist and composer for dramas at the "Bayerisches Staatsschauspiel" in Munich being engaged in avant-garde music of the 20th century. Alexander Veljanov, born in Republic of North Macedonia, was enrolled for film and theatre studies at the University of Music and Theatre Munich in 1985. He was part of the gothic subculture and mainly interested in Dark Wave. Alexander Veljanov described the first meeting with the about 10 years older Ernst Horn like this:

Two quite different men were standing face to face and the difference in age could not be overlooked. As we started talking about music, the ice melt quickly, though our taste in music could not have been more different.

— Alexander Veljanov, Der Tagesspiegel, January 2007

Ernst Horn was dissatisfied with his occupation in the past and wanted to do something more modern. He had recorded a few pieces for a new project in winter 1984 already. Only a singer was missing. In 1985 he advertised in a newspaper "Vocalist wanted who enjoys experimenting". After Alexander Veljanov contacted Ernst Horn responding to the ad, both met in Munich and founded Deine Lakaien within the same year.

Their debut album Deine Lakaien, that was distributed by themselves, was released in 1986 an edition of 500 records, which Ernst Horn financed personally. Though the musicians were looking for record stores all over Germany to sell the album, only few showed interest. Thanks to some stores a few 100 records could be sold eventually. The track Colour-Ize got played in local discos and became an underground-hit. The success of Deine Lakaien remained locally restrained. Colour-Ize was released in 1990 on the first Zillo-Sampler German Mystic Sound Sampler Volume I. At this time, the band was already under contract.

Despite the uncertain future they recorded a demo-tape in 1987, which was called Silver Tape due to the silver wrapping. With an edition of 50 pieces of the Silver Tape Deine Lakaien tried for years to attract interest of a label. A fan of Deine Lakaien contacted Carl Erling in 1989. Finally, Deine Lakaien signed a contract with him in 1990 and with the new founded sublabel ClassX took the band. From the Silver Tape only the pieces Days gone by, Reincarnation, and Love Me to the End were used for the next album. All the other pieces were dismissed by the band, though ClassX offered to release the Silver Tape without changes. The Silver Tape was re-released with the name 1987 in 2003.

=== The road to success (1990–1995) ===
Deine Lakaien was the first European band which got a record contract from Gymnastic Records and the uncertain times were over: In January 1991 the second album Dark Star was released and sold more than 5000 within the next months. The EP 2nd Star with more pieces and remixes was published already in November. The debut album got re-released end of 1991 and the band went on their first tour, playing in front of up to 800 people in Bochum. Since Ernst Horn and Alexander Veljanov wanted to give concerts without playback and bandtracks, two musicians reinforced the live ensemble: Violinist Christian „Komo“ Komorowski and Michael Popp, multi-instrumentalist and specialist for medieval music. Alexander Veljanov knew Christian Komorowski from the band Love Sister Hope, Michael Popp and Ernst Horn met each other at the Residence Theater in Munich. Together they founded the band Qntal also in 1991. Due to its tremendous success the Dark Star-Tour was continued in 1992, and with Dark Star-Tour '92 the first Live-album was released.

Deine Lakaien gave a concert in the Vier-Linden in Hildesheim already on 11 October 1991 that was recorded for the radio show Grenzwellen another followed on 19 February 1992 in the Hunky Dory in Detmold. Ecki Stieg, moderator of Grenzwellen, suggested an "Event on his own account" after the successful collaboration. Ernst Horn thought it would be a private party and developed a concept to perform pieces of Deine Lakaien with a prepared piano. The event shaped up as a festival with several bands in a hall. Though the audience was much larger than expected, the show was perceived very well. Thus, in December 1992 Deine Lakaien went on the Dark Moon-Tour, a first acoustic tour, together with Stephen Brown and Blaine L. Reininger from Tuxedomoon.

Deine Lakaien gave several more acoustic concerts in 1993. However, the musicians were mainly occupied with the recordings of the third album. Veljanov published the album Suck Success with his Side-project Run Run Vanguard in March 1993. Forest Enter Exit was released on 29 October 1993. It was the first album of Deine Lakaien which got into the charts. In November and December 1993 the first Forest Enter Exit-tour took place, which was continued in 1994. The concert on 10 December 1993 in the Durlach-Hall in Karlsruhe was filmed and published in 1995 as VHS. The first single, Mindmachine, was released in 1994. The second large-scale Acoustic tour with the instrumental group Das Holz as supporting act happened in 1995. Due to this occasion, the live-CD Acoustic was released. The second album of Qntal, Qntal II, was released, too. Alexander was working together with the English band Sleeping Dogs Wake, who got in touch with Deine Lakaien as their supporting act on the Forest Enter Exit tour.

=== The second decade (1996–2005) ===
To celebrate the 10th anniversary of the band, the VHS First Decade was published in 1996 with live-recordings and video clips. The album Winter Fish Testosterone was released in the same year. During March, April, October and November, the Winter Fish Testosterone tour took place, with Qntal as supporting act. The musicians stayed on stage during the entire concert, only Qntal singer Sigrid Hausen, left the stage during Un vers de dreyt nien and was replaced by Alexander Veljanov. ClassX was dismantled in autumn 1996 and replaced by Chrom Records. Deine Lakaien took a break to have time for solo activities.

The album Kasmodiah was recorded in 1998. Christian Komorowski and Michael Popp were present in the studio for the first time. They took part in the videos of Return and Into My Arms, and they became part of the official band. The album was released in 1999 together with the singles Return and Into My Arms, and Deine Lakaien toured together with Summit. For the release of Kasmodiah, Deine Lakaien worked together not only with Chrom Records but for the first time with the Major label Columbia Records. In 2000, Christian Komorowski and Michael Popp left the band. Ernst Horn parted from Qntal and founded Helium Vola.

Besides several side- and solo-activities, two acoustic concerts were given in 2001 - the first after six years - just after the recordings for the next album were completed. White Lies was released in January 2002. The single Generators had been published in October 2001. Two versions of Where you are were released in November 2002. The live-musicians Tobias "B. Deutung" Unterberg from The Inchtabokatables, Rober Wilcocks from Sleeping Dogs Wake and Summit, as well as Yvonne "Ivee Leon" Fechner and "Sharifa" joined the band for the tour in March and November 2002. The concert in the Lindenpark in Potsdam on 29 November 2002 was taped and released on DVD in 2003.

Only some bad bootlegs from the Silver Tape were circulating, because it never had been released. After Ernst Horn listened to a bootleg, where somebody added own pieces between the original tracks, Deine Lakaien decided finally to release the album after 16 years with the title 1987. The album April Skies was released in 2005 and the band was on tour again in April 2005. The band Vanilla Ninja used material from the video of the Deine Lakaien single Mindmachine from 1994 without consent for their own single Cool Vibes in 2005.

=== Present (since 2005) ===
In the following years, Deine Lakaien wanted to celebrate the 20th anniversary of the band with special events. The first was The concert that never happened before on 12 August 2005 at the Capitol in Hannover. For the first time in band history, Ernst Horn and Alexander Veljanov performed with electronic equipment only. They played songs of the first decade. In 2006, the video of the concert was released on DVD as limited edition. Still back in 2005, two Double-CD-editions were released: Dark Star combined with 2nd Star and Forest Enter Exit combined with Mindmachine. Only few concerts were given in 2006, amongst others one acoustic performance in the Neue Nationalgalerie with the exhibition Melancholia. Genius and Mania in arts and two concerts each in Russia and in Spain. In the summer 2006 A Fish called prince was released as new piece by Deine Lakaien on the sampler Where's Neil when you need him?. This sampler was a tribute to Neil Gaiman, when the film adaptation of his novel Stardust was released under the name Stardust.

The highlight of this anniversary was the tour 20 years of electronic avantgarde, which started in February 2007. Deine Lakaien performed together with the orchestra Neue Philharmonie Frankfurt at places like the Gasteig (Munich Philharmony) and the Alte Oper in Frankfurt. The concert on 18 February in the König Pilsener Arena in Oberhausen was recorded and released on 8 June in different versions with up to three DVDs and two CDs. More concerts were given in summer and autumn 2007. Deine Lakaien gave concerts with the usual line up in October 2007 in Germany, The Netherlands, France, Switzerland and Austria. Supporting act was Lola Angst. In 2008, Ernst Horn and Alexander Veljanov had a break to have time for their solo projects and gave only one concert at the Amphi festival in Cologne on 19 July, as well as an acoustic concert in Beijing. Two more concerts followed in China summer 2009, this time with band.

Deine Lakaien went on Acoustic tour in Germany again in December 2009, in January 2010, as well as in May 2012. The single Gone was released on 3 September 2010 and contained the additional songs Kraken and A Fish called Prince (acoustic version). Two weeks later, the album Indicator was released as an ordinary as well as limited edition. Robert Wilcocks left the live band after the Indicator tour in October 2010 on his own account.

After touring acoustic, Deine Lakaien recorded their 8th studio album Crystal Palace that was released in August 2014. The band returns to its origins with this album as completely electronic production without contributing guest musicians. Therefore, Slobodan Kajkut (drums) and Goran Trajkoski (E-guitar, electronics) joined Ernst Horn and Alexander Veljanov on the following tour. Both musicians accompanied Veljanov on his Porta Macedonia tour in 2009.

The band celebrated their 30th anniversary in 2016 with a kind of "best-of" album "XXX. The 30 Years Retrospective", which also contained previously unreleased studio and live material in the 4CD version. The following two years Deine Lakaien played several "XXX - The 30 Years Tour" concerts in special concert halls including the Berlin Philharmonie, the Cologne Philharmonie and the Dresden Kulturpalast. On this tour Horn and Veljanov were not only accompanied by all the current live musicians, i.e. apart from Kajkut and Trajkoski also B. Deutung, Ivee Leon and Katharina Garrard, but also presented their solo projects Helium Vola and Veljanov. A live recording of the tour was released, which also included selected footage of the concert at Laeiszhalle. In 2019 Deine Lakaien performed together with the solo projects as part of the Acoustica Tour. Apart from Goran Trajkoski, Igor Zotic supported the band and the solo project Veljanov. Alexander Veljanov performed on two Helium Vola tracks as a duet with Sabine Lutzenberger.

Due to the Corona pandemic, the band's 10th studio album could not be released in 2020 as originally planned and the tour planned for it also had to be postponed. Instead, Deine Lakaien gave a streaming concert on 16 July 2020, where they presented their cover version of "Because the night" (by Patti Smith and Bruce Springsteen) as a forerunner of the new album. The double album Dual, which contains half original compositions and half cover versions, was released on 16 April 2021. It was described by the band themselves as "by far the most elaborate studio album" in the band's history.

== Style ==
=== Name of the band ===
The name Deine Lakaien (which translates to "Your Lackeys") was suggested by Alexander Veljanov. It is a reference to a line of the song "Die Genaue Zeit" by Einstürzende Neubauten. Deine Lakaien was supposed to be an electronic project from the very beginning. However, both musicians thought that the Dark Wave movement had reached a dead end. Thus, they wanted a name without any connection to the scene. On the other hand, they wanted a German name, though it was clear at that time that the lyrics would be mainly English.

=== Music ===
The style of Deine Lakaien is mainly classified as Dark Wave. The majority of their studio albums are produced electronically, but there are exceptions: In Kasmodiah (1999) the musicians Michael Popp and Christian Komorowski join Deine Lakaien. White Lies (2002) was recorded with Patrizia Düringer (violin), Jost Hecker (cello), Uli Widenhorn (guitar), Riccardo Delfino (hurdy-gurdy) and Sabine Lutzenberger (vocals). In April Skies (2005) the actual live musicians take part.

The music is influenced by classical music and several artists of the 1970s and 1980s like Ultravox, Kraftwerk, Bauhaus and Joy Division. Stylistic diversity is an important characteristic of their music. On the early album Forest enter Exit, are collected such different pieces like Walk to the Moon – a quiet, emotional, mainly piano accompanied ballad, Nightmare – a mixture of slow passages and dissonant avant-garde parts, Resurrection Machine and Brain Fic – two technoid songs. Later albums are more uniform in character. Kasmodiah and White Lies are relatively calm; the newest album April Skies is livelier. This character is supported by the use of an electric guitar and influences of rock music.

=== Lyrics ===
Both musicians of Deine Lakaien contribute about half of the lyrics. At the beginning, mainly Ernst Horn was responsible for the lyrics, but for Winter Fish Testosterone the main part was written by Alexander Veljanov . Later, Ernst Horn's contribution to the lyrics increased again. He commented in an interview:

I have two main subjects: The totally depressive everything-in-vain subject, and on the other hand the philosophic, political.

— Ernst Horn in an interview with laut.de

Dark Star from 1991 is a concept album about love, while the Silver Tape from 1987 deals with death. The debut from 1986 is about someone, who moves from the country side into the city and fails. Later albums do not have a concept anymore. The lyrics contain a lot self-mockery, and dark humor.

Most of the songs of Deine Lakaien have English lyrics. There are only few exceptions of German (Lass Mich, Album: Kasmodiah; Bei Nacht, Single: One Night) or French (Vivre, Album: April Skies; Europe, Album: Indicator) lyrics. Though they have German titles, the songs Frühlingstraum (Album: Dark Star) and Wunderbar (Album: White Lies) are in English (the German word „wunderbar“ in the mentioned song is used in the chorus). The song The old man is dead of the album Indicator contains German text fragments.

=== Concerts ===
Through the years, Ernst Horn and Alexander Veljanov developed different ways of presenting their music live. The guiding idea was to differ significantly from the typical "Synth-Duo" with keyboard, DAT, and vocals.

The first concept presenting the music of Deine Lakaien included Ernst Horn with his synthesizers (later a piano was added), Christian „Komo“ Komorowski with violin, and Michael Popp with electric guitar and various medieval instruments in addition to the vocals by Alexander Veljanov. This was the lineup of most of the concerts between 1991 and 2001. Concerts of this decade are recorded on the album Dark Star-Tour '92 as well as on the video cassettes First Decade and Forest Enter Exit. After the breakup with their live musicians, Ernst Horn and Alexander Veljanov found a new lineup in 2002 with Tobias „B. Deutung“ Unterberg on the violoncello, Robert Wilcocks with electric guitar, as well as the violinists Yvonne „Ivee Leon“ Fechner and „Sharifa“, who are also vocalists.

The first "Acoustic"-concert, where Alexander Veljanov was accompanied by Ernst Horn on the grand piano alone, happened in 1992. The piano was prepared as by John Cage to mimic the usually electronic sounds. Extensive "Acoustic"-Tours followed in 1992 and 1995. The Live-CD Acoustic was recorded on the latter. Every now and then, Deine Lakaien give "Acoustic"-concerts until today.

The Concert That never Happened Before in January 2005 was the only concert with vocals and pure electronics. The concert was released on DVD with the same title.

Deine Lakaien did a tour with orchestra for the first time in 2007. The live-band played together with 40 musicians of the Neuen Philharmonie Frankfurt in different concert venues and concert halls throughout Germany. It was very important for the band to differ from bands like Metallica, who had their songs just rearranged for the S&M concerts:

It's dumb to just play one's songs and to pour some sticky syrup of classical music onto them, this is really sad.

— Alexander Veljanov

Ernst Horn was able to rewrite the pieces for orchestra due to his background in classical music. The orchestra did not play every piece, there were in fact also pure electronic songs. Ernst Horn was mainly inspired by 20th-century classical music after the second world war, including unusual use of the instruments like knocking on them or playing col legno. Ernst Horn was mainly conducting, but played piano and keyboard as well.

These different live-instrumentations are important for the band to elaborate the theme of a song:

It is not like just removing one violin, but these are really reinterpretations, which construe the character of a song again and again.

— Alexander Veljanov

== Discography ==
=== Albums ===
- Deine Lakaien, 1986
- Dark Star, 1991 (reissued in 2005 combined with '2nd Star' EP)
- Forest Enter Exit, 1993
- Winter Fish Testosterone, 1996
- Kasmodiah, 1999
- White Lies, 2002
- April Skies, 2005
- Indicator, 2010
- Crystal Palace, 2014
- Dual, 2021
- Dual+, 2021

=== Live ===
- Dark Star Live, 1992
- Acoustic, 1995
- Live in Concert, 2003
- 20 Years of Electronic Avantgarde, 2009 (Orchestral recordings)
- Acoustic II, 2013

=== Compilations ===
- 1987, 2003 (Early material)
- XXX. The 30 Years Retrospective, 2016

=== Singles and EPs ===
Year	Single	Peak chart positions	Album		
Year	Single	GER	Album		
1991	"2nd Star"	—	EP only		
1994	"Mindmachine"	—	Forest Enter Exit		
1999	"Return"	85	Kasmodiah		
1999	"Into My Arms"	64	Kasmodiah		
2001	"Generators"	58	White Lies		
2002	"Where You Are / In the Chains Of"	80	White Lies		
2005	"Over and Done"	51	April Skies		
2010	"Gone"	—	Indicator		
2011	"One Night"	—	Indicator		
2011	"Special Indicator EP"	—	Indicator		
2014	"Farewell / Where the Winds Don't Blow"	—	Crystal Palace		
2020	"Because the Night"	—	Dual		
2020	"Because of Because"	—	Dual	—	"—" denotes releases that did not chart.

=== Video/DVD ===
- Mindmachine, 1994 (Video Single)
- Forest Enter Exit, 1994 (Live Video)
- First Decade, 1996 (Video Compilation)
- Live In Concert, 2003 (Live DVD)
- The concert that never happened before. (2006) (Live DVD)
- 20 Years Of Electronic Avantgarde, 2009 (2 DVDs of orchestral recordings - also available as 3-DVD + 2-CD box set)
