= Caccini =

Caccini (pronounced [katˈtʃiːni]) is an Italian surname from Florence and Northwest Italy, possibly derived from a medieval given name. Notable people with the surname include:

- Francesca Caccini (1587–1640s), Italian singer, composer and musician
- Giovanni Battista Caccini (1556–c. 1612), Italian sculptor
- Giulio Caccini (1551–1618), Italian composer, father of Francesca
- Settimia Caccini (1591–1638?), Italian singer and occasional composer, sister of Francesca
- Tommaso Caccini (1574–1648), Italian Dominican friar who denounced Galileo from the pulpit

== See also ==
- Palazzo Caccini, a building in Florence, Italy
- Caccinia, a genus of flowering plants
- Caccin (disambiguation)
