= Ensemble Micrologus =

Ensemble Micrologus is an Italian group that performs vocal and instrumental medieval music, including both religious and secular pieces from the 12th to the 16th century in their repertoire.

Through research into manuscripts, organology, and iconography, and a familiarity with ethnographic research on the musical traditions of the Mediterranean, they revive the sound of the Middle Ages, playing reconstructions of ancient instruments as well as using period wardrobe and scenery. They perform more than forty concerts worldwide annually, introducing one or two new shows every year, as well as collaborating in movies and theater productions, such as the soundtrack of the Academy Award-winning Mediterreneo. In 2007 and 2008 they toured with Myth, a theater-dance show produced by Belgian choreographer Sidi Larbi Cherkaoui. They also teach medieval music courses at the Festival of Urbino, the Royaumont Abbey, and the Cité de la Musique in Paris.

== Members ==
The group was founded in 1984 by musicians who had participated for several years in the Calendimaggio medieval festival in Assisi (Umbria). The four founder members were:

- Patrizia Bovi (vocals and harp),
- Adolfo Broegg (1961–2006) (lute, psaltery and citola),
- Goffredo Degli Esposti (flute, bombarde and bagpipes)
- Gabriele Russo (viela, rebec and lyre).

Additional performers include Ulrich Pfeifer (vocals and hurdy-gurdy).

== Awards ==
Over the past 26 years they recorded more than 20 performances on the labels Opus 111 (later bought by Naïve) and Zig Zag Territoires, which have received numerous awards:

- 1996 - Diapason d'Or de l'Année for the album Landini e la Musica Fiorentina
- 1999 - Diapason d'Or de l'Année for the album Alla Napolitana (in collaboration with Cappella della Pietà de' Turchini)
- 2000 - Best recording of the year from Goldberg Magazine, for Cantico della Terra

Other recordings that have received awards are Napoli Aragonese (2001), Laudario di Cortona (2001), El Llibre Vermell de Montserrat (2003), and Le Jeu de Robin et Marion by composer Adam de la Halle (2004).
