= Studio der frühen Musik =

German early-music ensemble (1960–1980)

- Origin: Munich, Bavaria, Germany
- Genre: Early music
- Years active: 1960–1980
- Past members: Thomas Binkley; Sterling Jones; Andrea von Ramm; Nigel Rogers; Willard Cobb; Richard Levitt

Studio der frühen Musik was an early-music ensemble active from 1960–1980 and based in Munich.

The leader of the group was Thomas Binkley, and the activity of the group coincided with the years he was teaching at the Schola Cantorum Basiliensis. Core members of the group were Binkley (lute), Sterling Jones (vielle) and Andrea von Ramm (mezzo-soprano, rebec, hurdy-gurdy, and harp), who had previously organised an earlier Studio der frühen Musik in Cologne. Added to these three members was a male singer: the tenors Nigel Rogers (1960–1964) and Willard Cobb (1964–1970), and the countertenor Richard Levitt (1970–1979). The activity of the group ceased when Binkley returned to America to found the Early Music Institute at the Indiana University School of Music in 1979.

An important predecessor to the ensemble was New York Pro Musica, founded in 1952 by Noah Greenberg. However, Studio der frühen Musik produced a "radically different sound" and anticipated other ensembles such as the Early Music Consort of London of David Munrow and Christopher Hogwood (founded 1967, disbanded in 1976 following Munrow's death) and the Clemencic Consort, founded in 1969 by recorder player René Clemencic. The end of Studio der frühen Musik's activity coincided with the watershed in medieval performance moving to a cappella performance typified by Gothic Voices, founded by Christopher Page in 1980.
