= Qntal =

German dark wave band

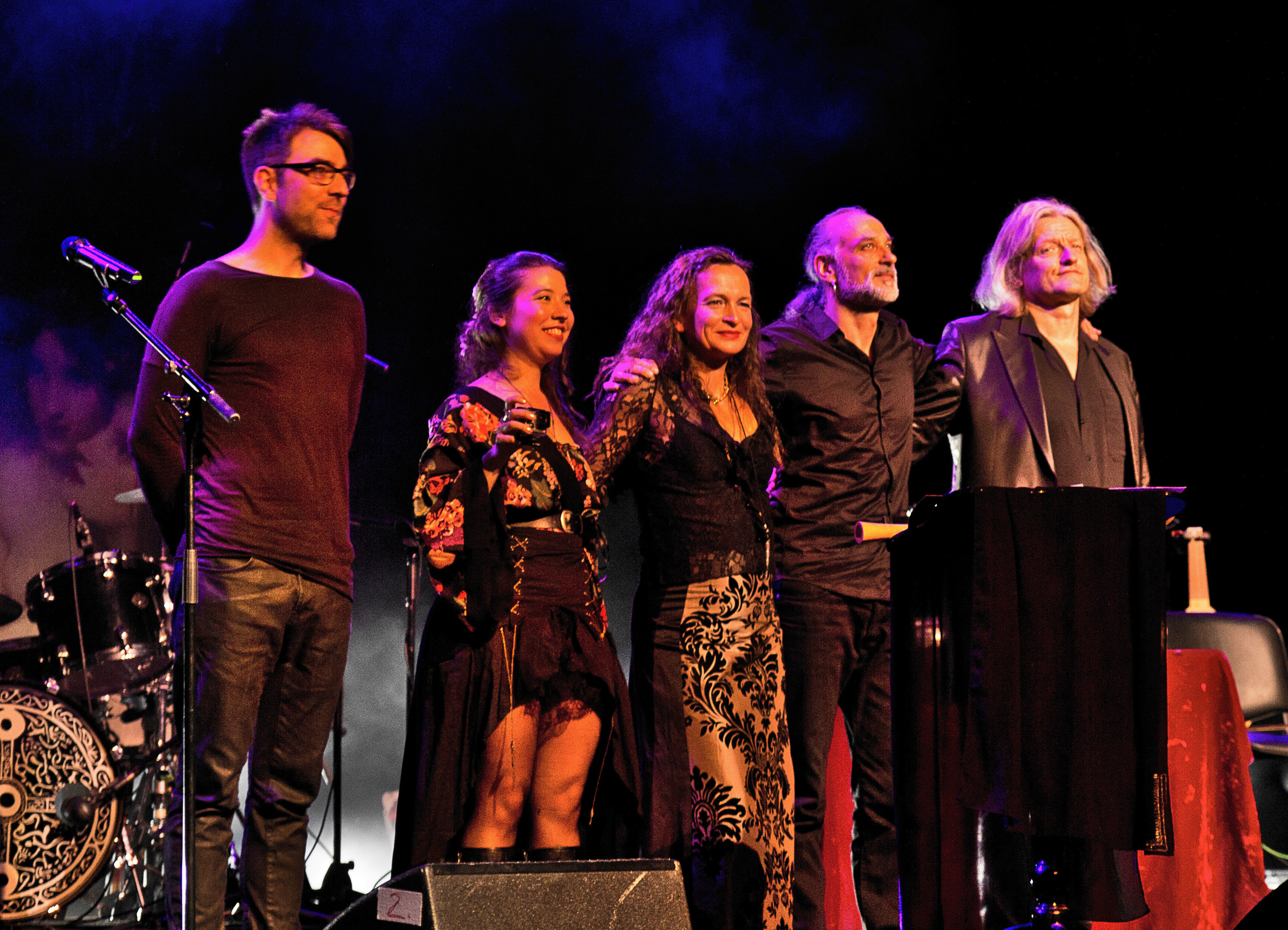
- Qntal at the 2015 Wave-Gotik-Treffen

Background information
- Origin: Germany
- Genres: Dark wave; electronic; neoclassical dark wave; ethereal wave
- Years active: 1991–present
- Labels: Gymnastic Records, Stars in the Dark, Noir Records, Drakkar Entertainment
- Spinoff of: Estampie
- Members: Sigrid Hausen (Syrah); Michael Popp; Sarah M. Newman (Mariko); Leon Rodt; Markus Köstner
- Past members: Ernst Horn; Philipp Groth (Fil)
- Website: www.qntal.de

Qntal is a German dark wave band founded in 1991 by Michael Popp and Ernst Horn. They later added vocalist Syrah (Sigrid Hausen) to complete the band.

The band has roots in Estampie, an acoustic band based on "authentic" Early music, whereas Qntal is a dark electronic "crossover" project. Michael Popp and Syrah are the principal members. Horn left the group in 1999, to concentrate on his other band, Deine Lakaien. He later formed Helium Vola in 2001. Philipp Groth (a.k.a. Fil) then joined Qntal. In 2008, singer and violist Sarah M. Newman (Mariko) left the New York–based band Unto Ashes to work with Qntal and Estampie in Germany.

The band's lyrics are primarily drawn from historical sources. Throughout their first three albums, lyrics were primarily in Latin, medieval German, Galician-Portuguese and a few other European tongues. On Qntal IV, the band added a few songs in English to their body of work. Two tracks from this album, Cupido and Flamma, reached the 2005 DAC, peaking at № 1 and № 8 respectively.

"Qntal" is an unknown word that appeared in one of Syrah's dreams. Pronounced by her as [kɑn-tʌl].

Qntal has headlined at significant goth and industrial music festivals such as Wave-Gotik-Treffen and M'era Luna. Qntal's debut U.S. concert took place in September 2004 at Dracula's Ball in Philadelphia. In 2007, 2008, and 2011 the band was featured in the Bad Faerie Ball at the Baltimore FaerieCon.

== Discography ==
=== Studio albums ===
Year	Title	Label	Peak positions
Year	Title	Label	GER
1992	Qntal I	Gymnastic Records	—
1995	Qntal II	Gymnastic Records	—
2003	Qntal III: Tristan und Isolde	Stars in the Dark / Noir Records	—
2005	Qntal IV: Ozymandias	Drakkar Entertainment / Noir Records	71
2006	Qntal V: Silver Swan	Noir Records	74
2008	Qntal VI: Translucida	Drakkar Entertainment	77
2014	Qntal VII	Drakkar Entertainment	—
2018	Qntal VIII: Nachtblume	Drakkar Entertainment	—
2022	Qntal IX: Time Stands Still	Drakkar Entertainment	—

=== EPs ===
Year	Title	Label
2003	Nihil	Stars in the Dark / Vielklang Musikproduktion
2004	Illuminate	Noir Records

=== Compilations ===
- 2008 – Purpurea: The Best Of, Drakkar Entertainment

=== Singles ===
- 2002 – O, Tristan
- 2003 – Entre Moi
- 2005 – Cupido
- 2005 – Flamma
- 2006 – Von den Elben
- 2008 – Sumer
- 2017 – Music on the Waters
- 2018 – Die finstere Nacht
- 2018 – Nachtblume
- 2022 – Winterly Waves

=== Special releases ===
- 2006 – Qntal V: Silver Swan 2 CD; Noir Records Special Edition featuring artwork by Brian Froud

=== Compilation appearances ===
- 1993 – "Por Mau Tens" on German Mystic Sound Sampler Volume IV, Zillo
- 1993 – "Ad Mortem Festinamus" on We Came To Dance - Indie Dancefloor Vol. III, Sub Terranean
- 2005 – "Ecce Gratum (Club Mix)" on Asleep by Dawn Magazine Presents: DJ Ferrets Underground Mix #1, Asleep by Dawn Magazine
- 2005 – "Entre Moi Et Mon Amin" on Sleepwatching, Vol. 1 DVD, Asleep by Dawn Magazine
- 2006 – "Von Den Elben" music video on Asleep By Dawn - DJ Ferret's Underground Mix #2 CD/DVD, Asleep by Dawn Magazine

== Members ==
=== Current members ===
- Sigrid "Syrah" Hausen (since 1991) – Vocals
- Michael Popp (since 1991) – Vocals, vielle, saz, shawm, oud, tar
- Mariko (since 2010) – Violist, backing vocals
- Markus Köstner (since 2005) – Live drummer

=== Former members ===
- Ernst Horn (1991–1999)
- Philipp "Fil" Groth (2002–2014) – Keyboards, vocals, guitars, programming
