= Thomas Binkley =

American lutenist and early music scholar (1931–1995)

Thomas Binkley (Cleveland, Ohio, December 26, 1931 – Bloomington, Indiana, April 28, 1995) was an American lutenist and early music scholar.

Thomas Eden Binkley studied at the University of Illinois Urbana-Champaign (BM. 1956, PhD. 1959) and the Ludwig-Maximilians-Universität München (1957–58). He taught at the Schola Cantorum Basiliensis in Basel (1973–77). He was then founding director of the Indiana University Early Music Institute at Bloomington, Indiana from 1979 until his death from cancer at the age of 63. For twenty years (1960–1980), he led the Studio der frühen Musik in Munich with Andrea von Ramm (1928–99) and Sterling Jones, producing an extensive discography of medieval music.

Binkley was effectively house artist for EMI Electrola in the first years of the EMI Reflexe series in Germany. The distinctive Dalíesque covers for the series were designed by Roberto Patelli (b. 1925) an Italian graphic artist resident in Cologne.
