= Ernst Horn =

German musician

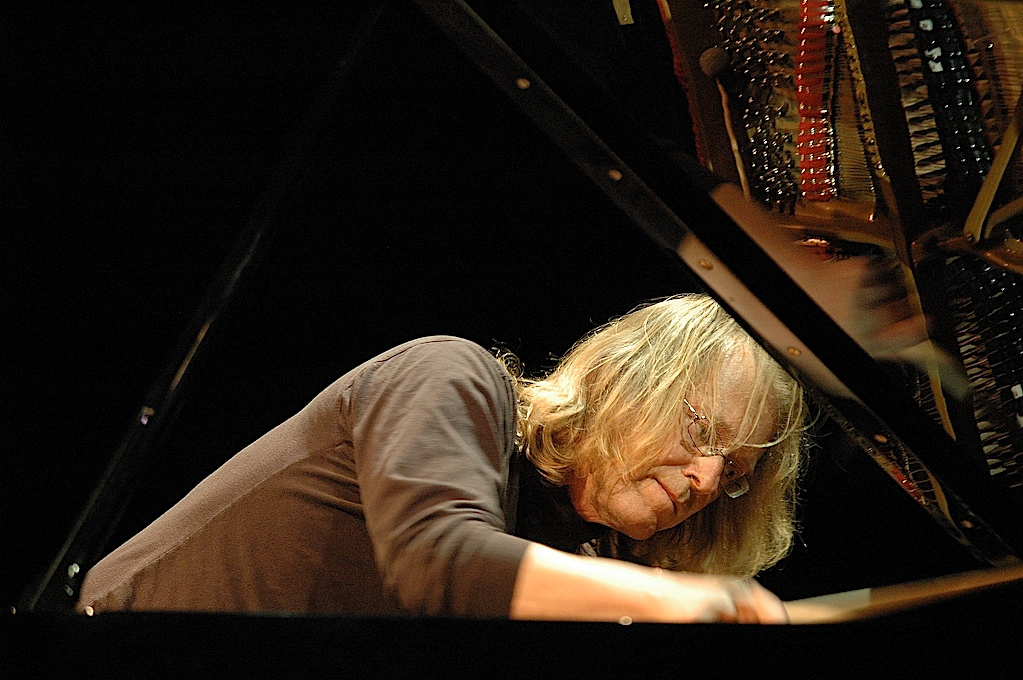
- Ernst Horn performing on a prepared piano in Berlin.

Background information
- Born: 1949 (age 76–77)
- Origin: Munich, Germany
- Genres: Avant-garde, Neoclassical, Darkwave
- Occupations: Conductor, composer
- Instruments: Piano, percussion
- Years active: 1985 – present
- Website: www.ernsthorn.de

Ernst Horn (born 1949 in Munich) is a German musician who played a crucial part in founding the bands Deine Lakaien, Qntal and Helium Vola.

== Biography ==
Ernst Horn studied conducting, piano, and percussion in Munich, Freiburg and Hamburg. Afterwards, he worked as a conductor at the state theatres of Karlsruhe and Oldenburg, as well as a composer and as a pianist for dramas at the Bavarian State Theatre in Munich. He gave up his career as a conductor in 1985 to become a composer and specialist for electronic music. In the same year, he founded the band Deine Lakaien together with Alexander Veljanov, which is his most famous project since then. The popularity of this band has far exceeded the borders of the German speaking countries. In addition to his main occupation as musician and composer of electronic music, Ernst Horn composes and plays music for dramas and radio plays.

Horn created his own style with structured electronic compositions far away from the mainstream. His first solo-work Einzelhaft won the Reader Tape Contest of the Keyboard Magazine in 1988. Usually, Horn combines electronic elements with other styles of composition and/or samples. The radio play "Greed Freedom", where the medieval style of a hymn gets connected to spoken word samples, is a good example. It also shows Horn's interest in picking up political and social issues. Another feature that is used here are the voices of children. This element of style is use frequently by Horn as, e.g., on the Helium Vola album "Liod", or in the piece "Acht", which shows the good sense of humor of this artist as well.

In commissioned compositions for the Neue Philharmonie Frankfurt ("Spiegelarien", 2009) and within the framework of the Leipzig Bach Festival ("B.A.C.H. – Alternative Compositions on Historical Basics", 2012), Ernst Horn combined works of old masters like G. F. Handel and J. S. Bach with his own compositions, which are influenced by 20th-century classical music.

Ernst Horn lives and works in Munich. Fellow Municher Rudy Ratzinger (Wumpscut) dedicated a song to him.

== Discography (solo) ==
- 1989: Johnny Bumm – Wurstsemmeln/ Sauerkraut [12" Vinyl- Maxi + Maxi-CD]
- 1991: The Skies over Baghdad [CD-Album]
- 1998: Johnny Bumm's wake [CD-Album]
- 2003: Lili Marleen, Baghdad 2/91 [Mini-CD-Album]

== Radio plays ==
- 1994: Johann Gottfried Seume – Einige Nachrichten zu den Vorfällen in Polen im Jahre 1794 [Sendung im BR]
- 1995: Velimir Chlebnikov – Die Zukunft des Radio [Sendung im BR]
- 1997: Carlfriedrich Claus – Basale Sprech- Operationsräume (Remix) [Sendung auf Bayern 2]
- 2008: Greed / Freedom [Sendung auf Bayern 2]
- 2009: Klinik [CD "Klinik/ Muttersterben: Michael Lentz Hörspiele"]

== Remixes ==
- 1994: Project Pitchfork – Renascence (Opera Mix) [Maxi-CD "Project Pitchfork – Renascence"]
- 1999: Wolfsheim – Heroin, She Said (Ernst Horn-Remix) [CD-Sampler "Zillo Mystic Sounds 8"]
- 1999: Das Ich – He Mensch (remixed by Ernst Horn) [CD-Album "Das Ich – re_laborat"]
- 1999: Silence – Scream (remix by ernst horn) [Maxi-CD "Silence – Son Of Sin"]
- 2000: Walter Ruttmann – Sympathie für Schulze (Remix) [CD- Sampler "Walter Ruttmann Weekend Remix"]
- 2002: VNV Nation – Beloved (Deine Lakaien- Remix) [Maxi- CD "VNV Nation – Beloved.1"]
- 2006: Silence – Scream, Greeneyes (Ernst Horn- Remix) [CD- Sampler "Key-Anthology/Rarities"]

== Further songs ==
- 1988: Ernst Horn – Einzelhaft (Keyboard Soundpage Contest Winner) [Vinyl, 7" Flexi-disc]
- 1995: Ernst Horn – Acht [CD- Sampler "Dem Rhythmus sein Bruder"]
- 2000: Ernst Horn – The Cliffs Of Norway [CD- Sampler "Subout by Waldorf"]
- 2002: Dracul fest. Ernst Horn – Leben [CD- Sampler "Nachtschwärmer 5"]

== Works as producer ==
- 1998: Estampie – Materia Mystica[CD- Album]
