= Adorni =

Adorni is an Italian surname. Notable people with the surname include:

- Agustín Adorni (born 1990), Argentine footballer
- Anna Maria Adorni Botti (1805–1893), Italian Roman Catholic nun
- Davide Adorni (born 1992), Italian footballer
- Lorenzo Adorni (born 1998), Italian footballer
- Manuel Adorni (born 1980), Argentine politician
- Vittorio Adorni (1937–2022), Italian cyclist

== See also ==
- Palazzo Adorni
- Palazzo Adorni Braccesi
- Adorno (surname)
