= Adorno (surname) =

Adorno is an Italian surname. Notable people with the surname include:

- Adorno family, Italian noble family of the Republic of Genoa (includes a list of members bearing the name)
- Aldo Adorno (born 1982), Paraguayan footballer
- Ana E. Cucurella-Adorno, Puerto Rican academic
- Andrea Adorno (born 1980), Italian Army soldier
- Caterina Fieschi Adorno (1447–1510), Italian Catholic saint and mystic
- Eduard Adorno (1910–2000), German politician
- Gretel Adorno (1902–1993), German chemist and intellectual figure in the Frankfurt School
- Guadalupe Adorno (born 2000), Paraguayan-Argentine field hockey player
- Jean-Luc Adorno (born 1961), Monegasque swimmer
- Luisa Adorno (1921–2021), Italian writer and teacher
- Milciades Adorno (born 2005), Paraguayan footballer
- Omar Adorno (born 1972), Puerto Rican boxer
- Rolena Adorno (born 1942), American humanities scholar
- Rubén Adorno (born 1941), Puerto Rican basketball player
- Theodor W. Adorno (1903–1969), influential German sociologist and philosopher of the Frankfurt School

In addition, the surname is the namesake of the following places:

- Adorno traffic light, traffic light in Frankfurt, Germany
- Palazzo Adorno, multiple palaces in Italy
- 21029 Adorno, minor planet

== See also ==
- Adorni
