= Palazzo Adorno =

Palazzo Adorno may refer to:

- Palazzo Botta Adorno, neoclassical palace in Pavia, Italy
- Palazzo Cattaneo-Adorno, mannerist palace in Genoa, Italy

== See also ==
- Adorno (surname)
- Palazzo Adorni
