= Braccesi =

Braccesi is a surname. Notable people with the surname include:

- Alessandro Braccesi (1445–1503), Italian humanist, writer, and diplomat
- Lorenzo Braccesi (1941–2025), Italian historian of classical antiquity

== See also ==
- Palazzo Adorni Braccesi, historic building in Florence, Italy
