= Palazzo Anselmi Ristori =

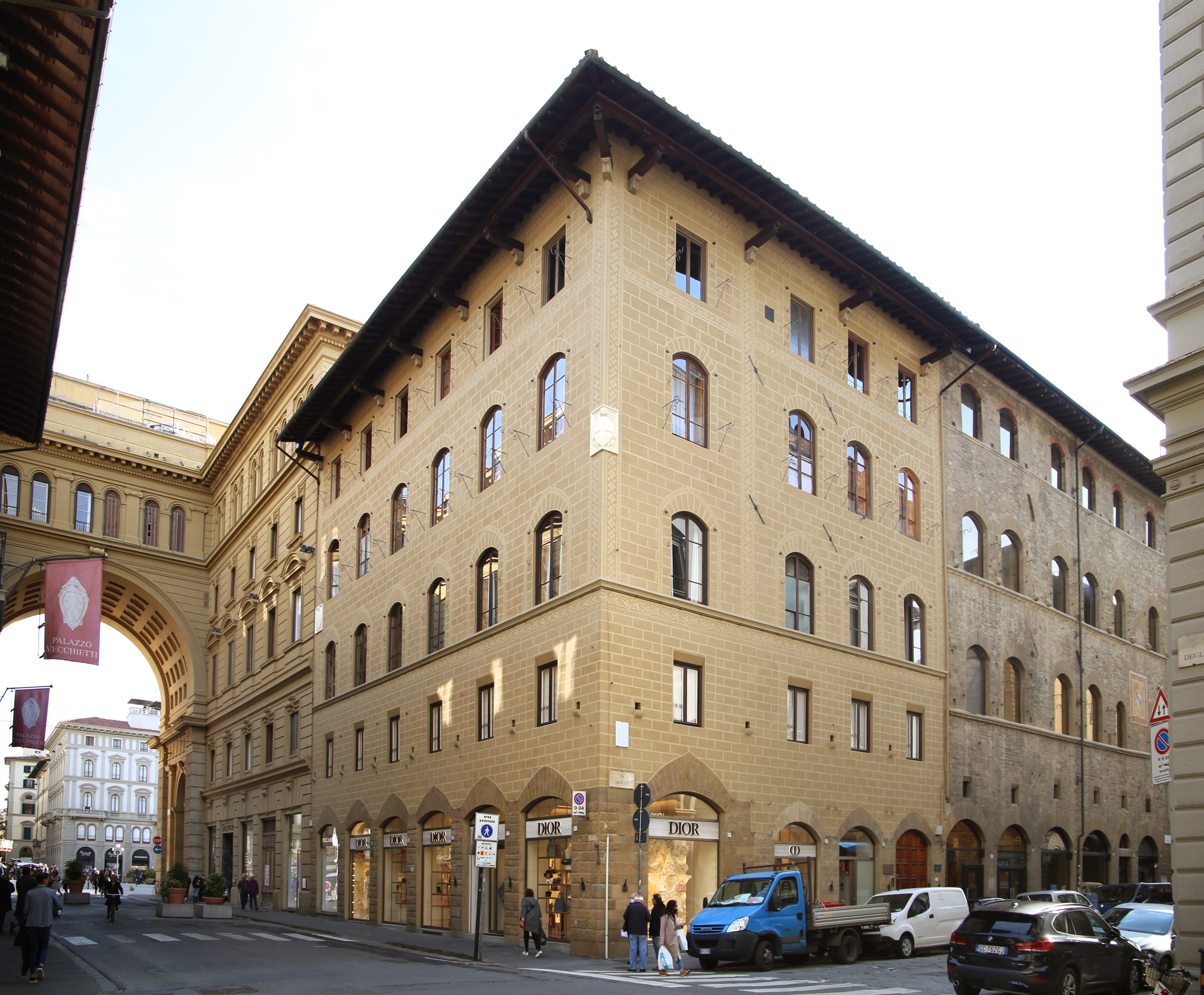
- Facade Palazzo Anselmi Ristori
- Interactive map of the Palazzo Anselmi Ristori area

General information
- Status: In use
- Type: Palace
- Architectural style: Mannerist
- Location: Florence, Toscana, Italy, 6, via de' Sassetti angolo via dei Vecchietti
- Coordinates: 43.771471°N 11.252898°E

Palazzo Anselmi Ristori is a building in the historical centre of Florence, located between via de' Sassetti 6 and via degli Strozzi 9r-11r-13r-15r-17r-19r.

== History and description ==
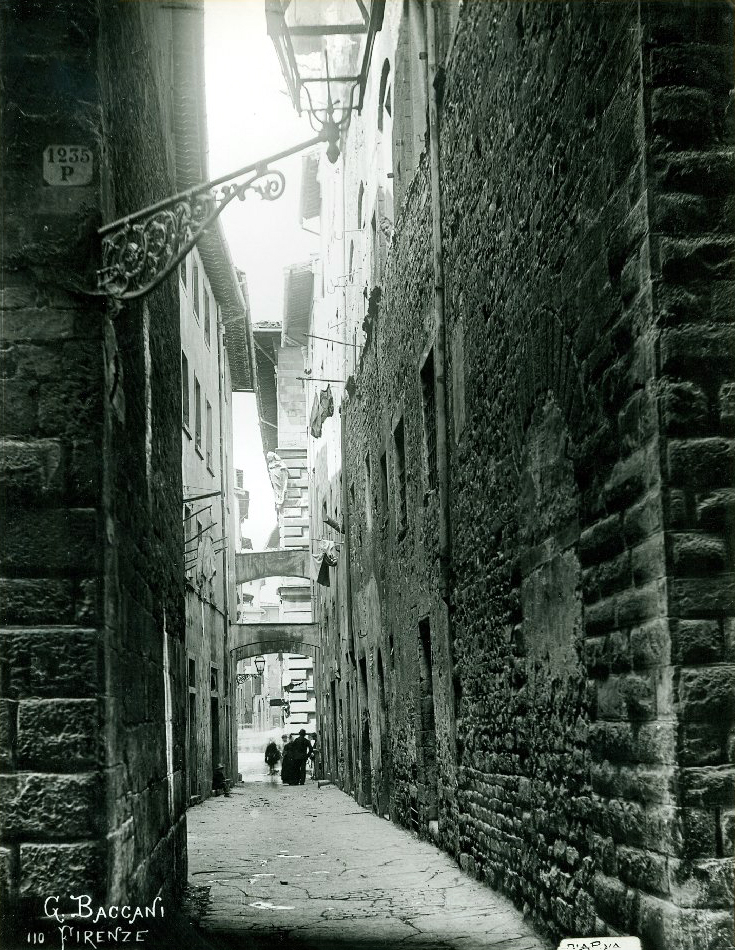
Vicolo della Torre de' Sassetti towards the Canto dei Diavoli.

Walther Limburger (1910) indicates the building as an ancient construction that was much restored in 1893. In fact, here stood the old houses of the Anselmi and the Sassetti, which passed to the Ristori family and then in the 19th century to the Alinari, who until the 1970s kept their photography shop here in the corner. As part of the work of «restoration» of the old centre and, more specifically, the extension of Via degli Strozzi (circa 1895) our building was partially demolished on the side of this street, then erected by the firm "Simonelli e C. " the new façade in the style that, with its graffitied drafts, the horseshoes at the bottom and the many sting irons flanking the simple windows at the top, must have appeared to many more than plausible in harking back to a medieval architecture that in this glimpse of via de' Sassetti is repeatedly recalled and that in the palazzo Davanzati standing out in the background has one of its best known examples. Not so for Guido Carocci who, from the pages of Arte e Storia judged the building to be «mean and the details badly chosen and worse applied. The splayed windows of the mezzanine and the rectangular ones of the third floor are not in relation to the rest of the building; the false drafts of the window surrounds are badly divided; the graffiti friezes placed in a perpendicular direction are a completely new invention; the windows without the recurring frame have never been seen in the comparable buildings of the 15th century…».

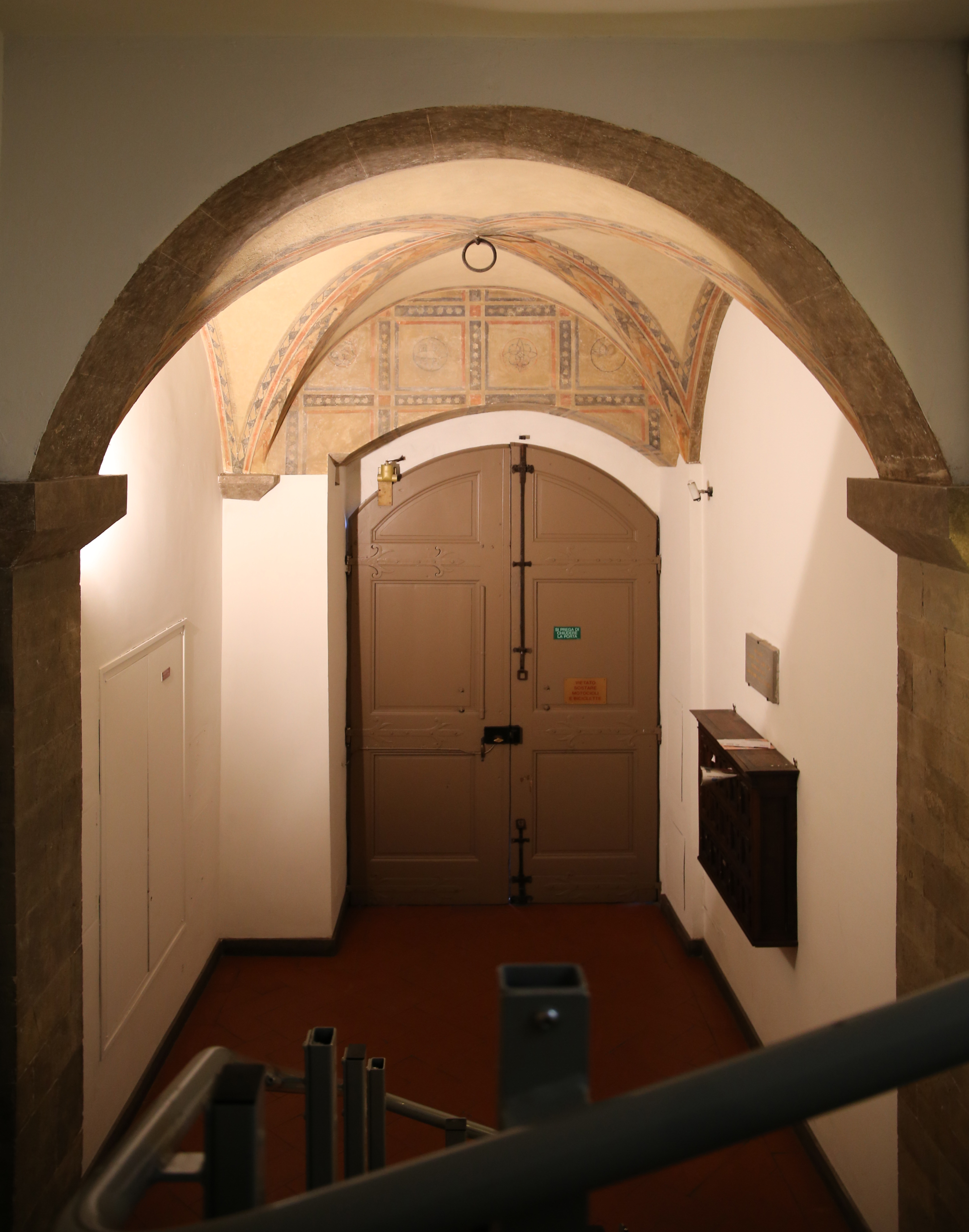
Entrance hall of palazzo Anselmi Ristori

Below are remains of the original structures, as they are in the entrance hall of the palace with ribbed vaults decorated with fourteenth-century motifs, from which the original staircase was accessed. The internal courtyard decorated with graffito is lost. On the left edge of the front on Via degli Strozzi there is a shield (indicated as fifteenth-century, but what we see today is evidently a cast) with the coat of arms of the Anselmi (blue, erased by five pieces of silver). On the corner with Via de' Sassetti is that of the Ristori of the San Giovanni district (golden, with the blue cross set aside by four red roses), placed in 1893.

All the fronts, which photographs from the 1960s show to be in a state of serious deterioration, were restored in 1975—1976 to a design by engineer Leonetto Materassi (an intervention awarded a prize by the Giulio Marchi Foundation in 1977, as a plaque in the entrance hall also reminds us), and again underwent conservation work between 2006 and 2007, to a design and supervision of works by architect Giulia Cellie.

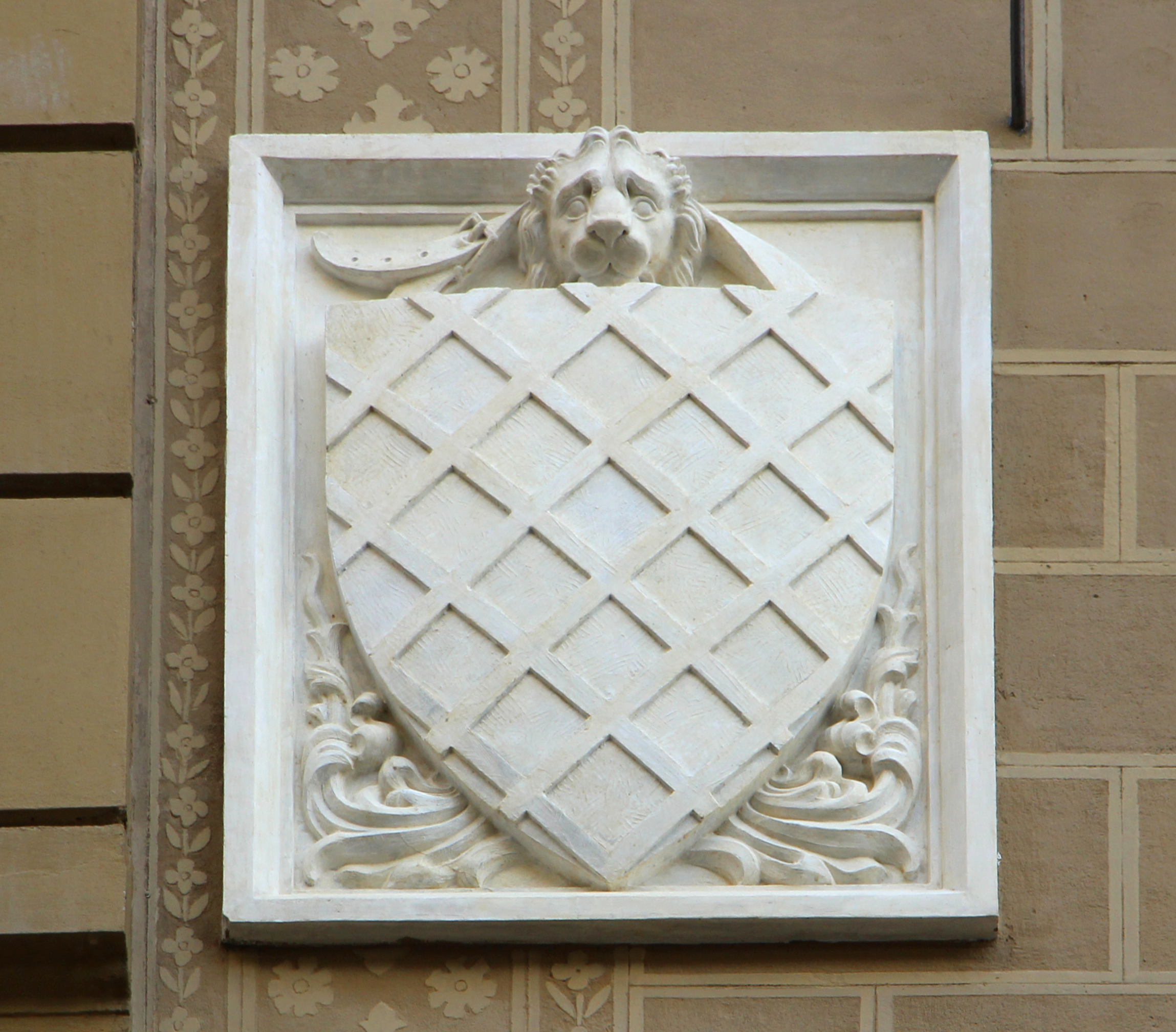
Anselmi coat of arms

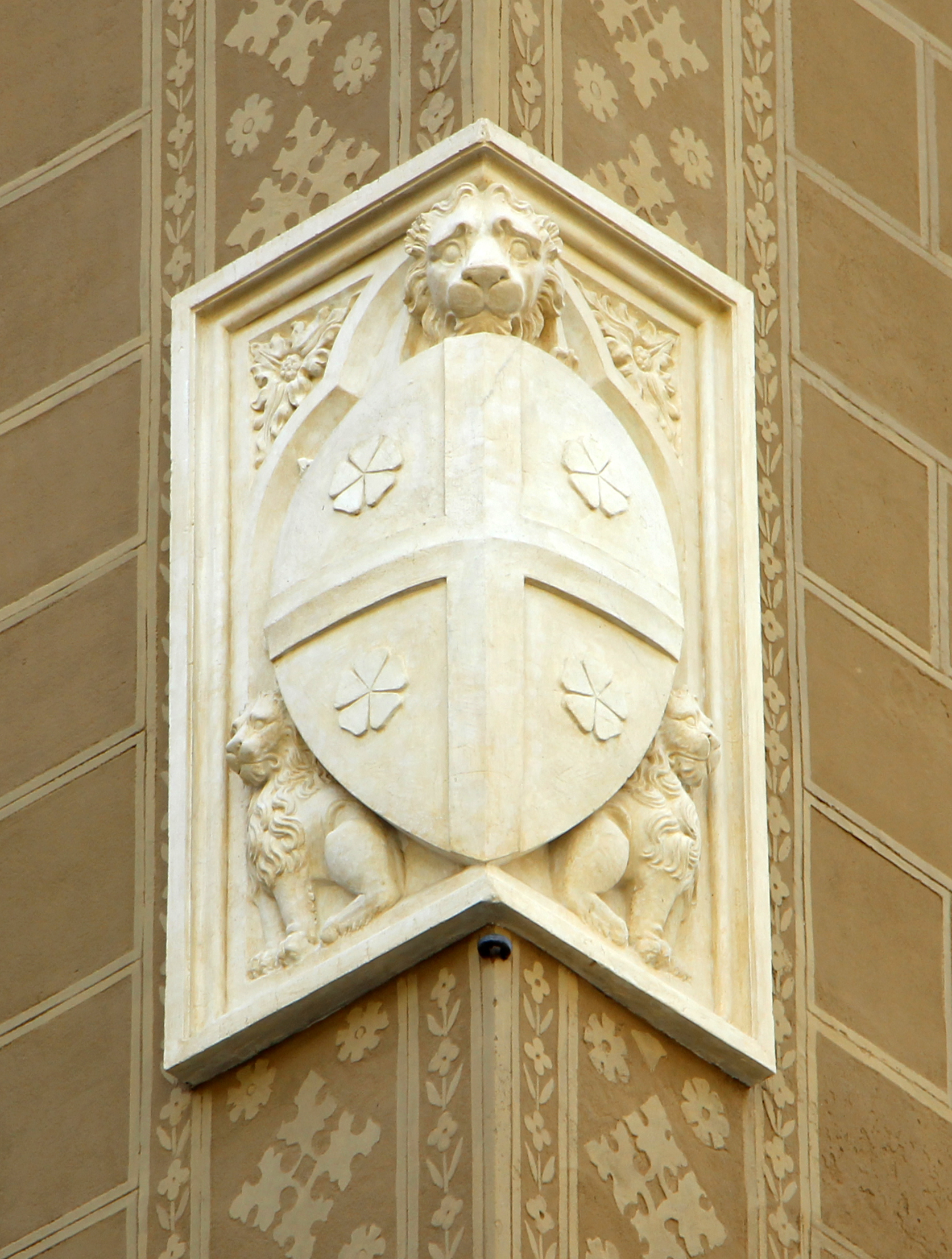
Ristori coat of arms

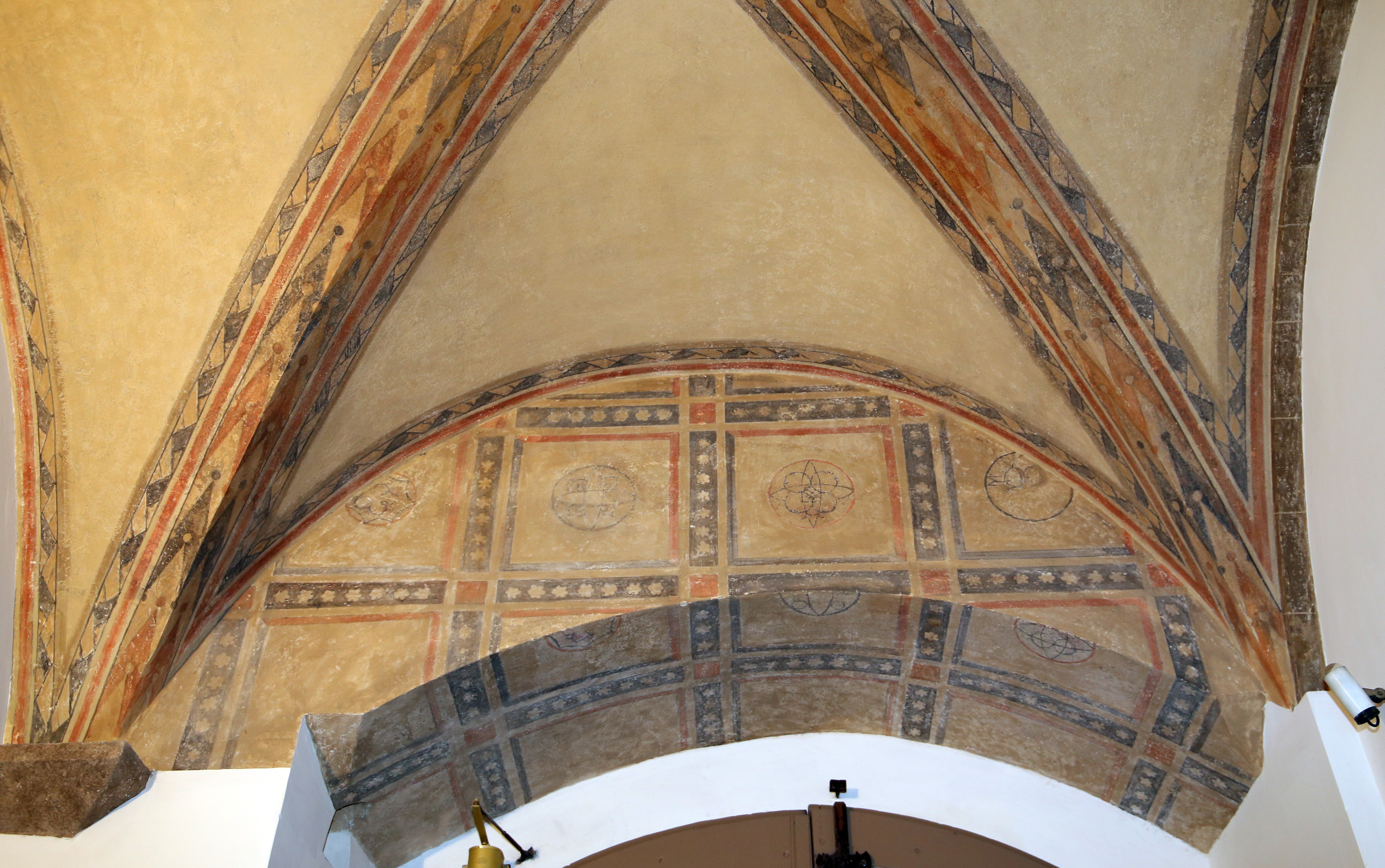
Traces of medieval frescoes in the entrance hall

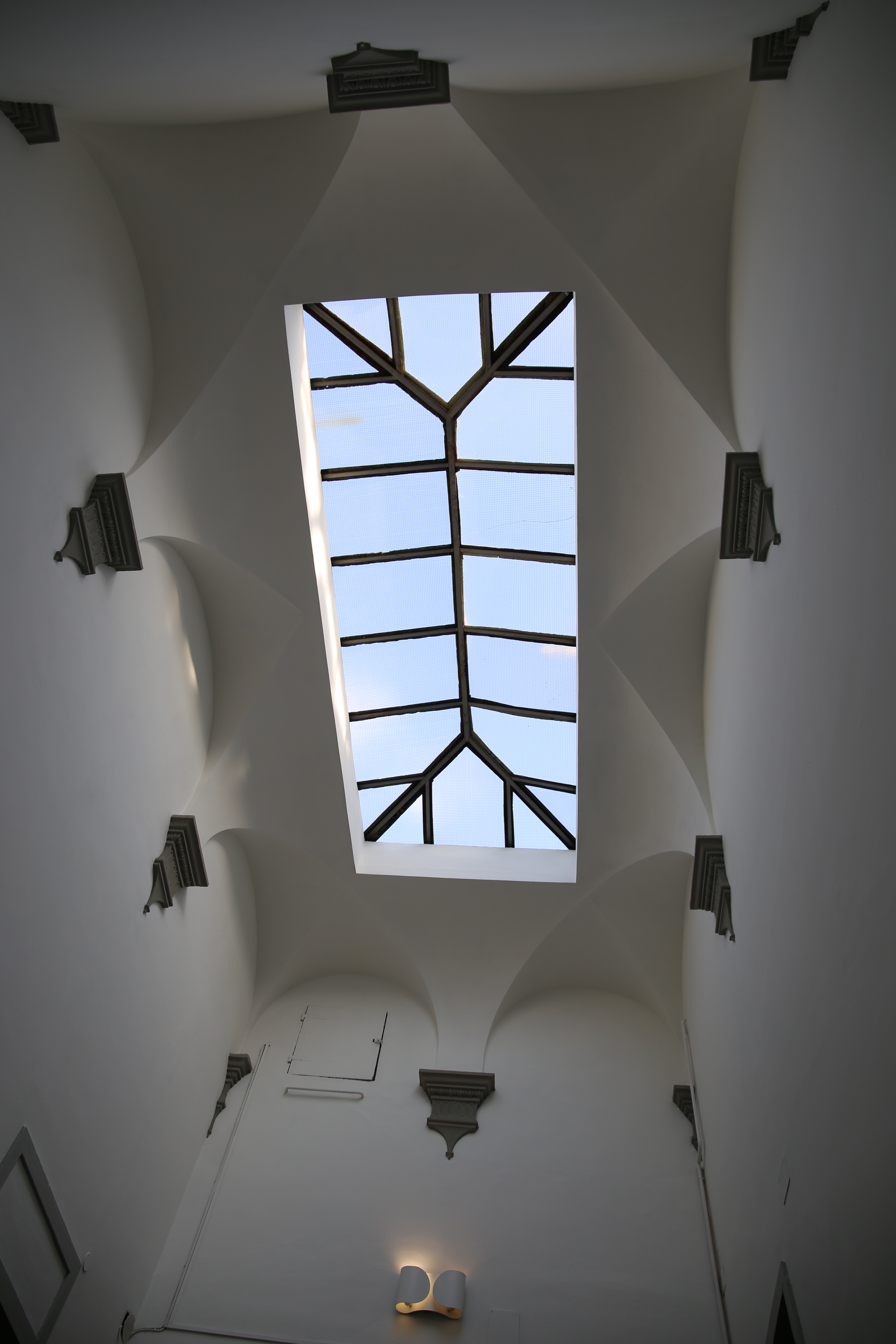
Stairwell skylight

== Bibliography ==
=== Italian sources ===
- Le case Anselmi e Sassetti, in "Arte e Storia", XII, 1893, 5, p. 38;
- Ancora del palazzo Sassetti, in "Arte e Storia", XII, 1893, 6, p. 46;
- Walther Limburger, Die Gebäude von Florenz: Architekten, Strassen und Plätze in alphabetischen Verzeichnissen, Lipsia, F.A. Brockhaus, 1910, n. 41;
- I Palazzi fiorentini. Quartiere di San Giovanni, introduzione di Piero Bargellini, schede dei palazzi di Marcello Jacorossi, Firenze, Comitato per l’Estetica Cittadina, 1972, p. 67, n. 108;
- Piero Bargellini, Ennio Guarnieri, Le strade di Firenze, 4 voll., Firenze, Bonechi, 1977-1978, III, 1978, p. 350; IV, 1978, p. 135;
- Il centro di Firenze restituito. Affreschi e frammenti lapidei nel Museo di San Marco, a cura di Maria Sframeli, Firenze, Alberto Bruschi, 1989, p. 237.
- Franco Cesati, Le strade di Firenze. Storia, aneddoti, arte, segreti e curiosità della città più affascinante del mondo attraverso 2400 vie, piazze e canti, 2 voll., Roma, Newton & Compton editori, 2005, II, p. 634.
- Restauro delle facciate di palazzo 'Alinari' già degli Anselmi a Firenze (Cellie), in "Opere Nuove", 4, allegato a "Opere. Rivista Toscana di Architettura", V, 2007, 16, pp. 66-67.
