= Palazzo Caccini =

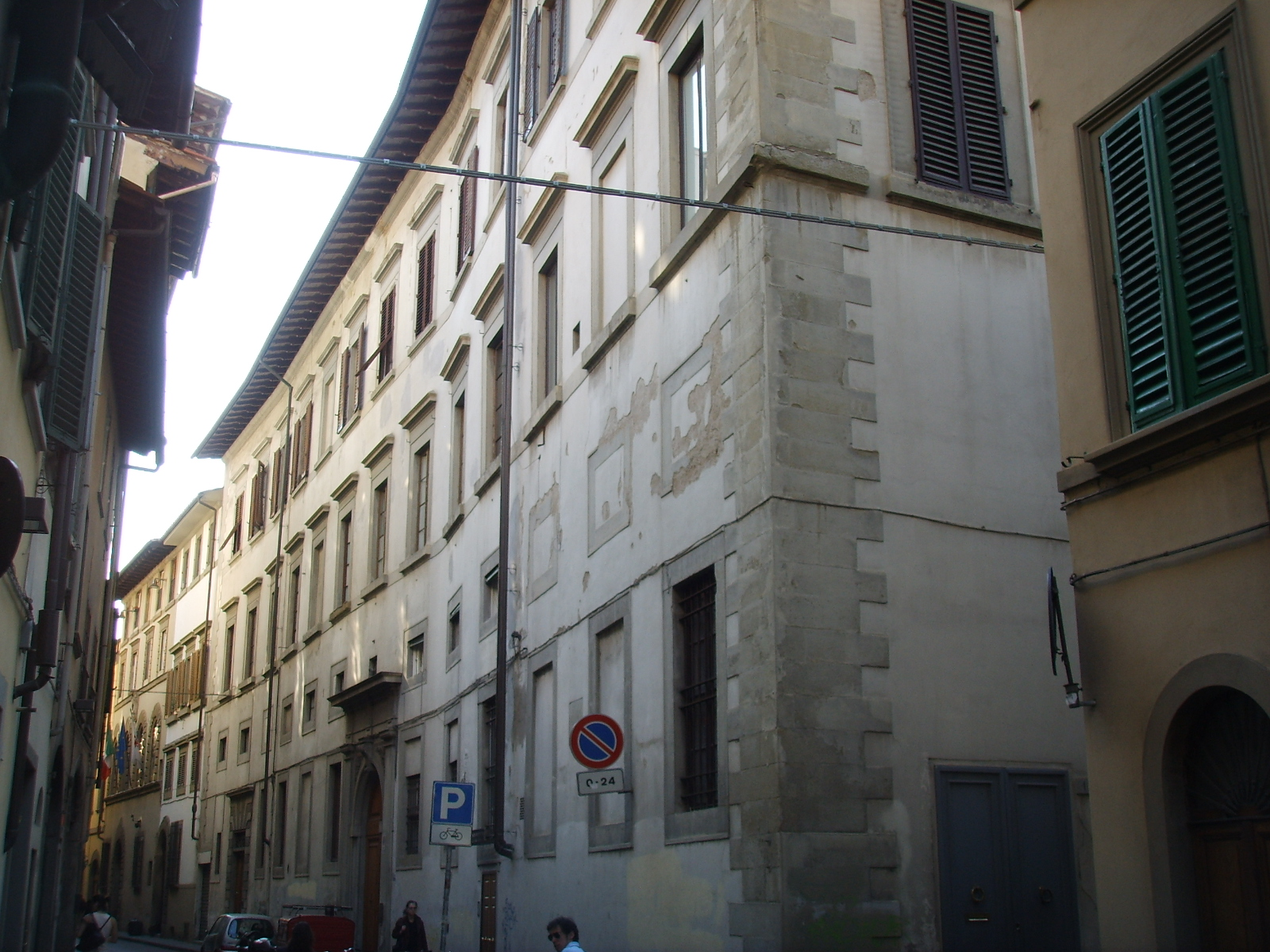
- Palazzo Caccini

General information
- Status: In use
- Type: Palace
- Architectural style: Mannerist
- Location: Florence, Toscana, Italy, 31 via Borgo Pinti
- Coordinates: 43.773419°N 11.263108°E
- Construction started: 15th century

Palazzo Caccini (also known as Palazzo del Corona) is located in Florence at Borgo Pinti 31–33, on the corner of Via Nuova dei Caccini.

== History and description ==
In the 15th century this was the home of the Ferrantini family, known for having been chosen – evidently because of the nobility and spaciousness of the rooms – to host the Patriarch of Constantinople and the twenty-three Orthodox bishops during the Council of Florence of 1439.

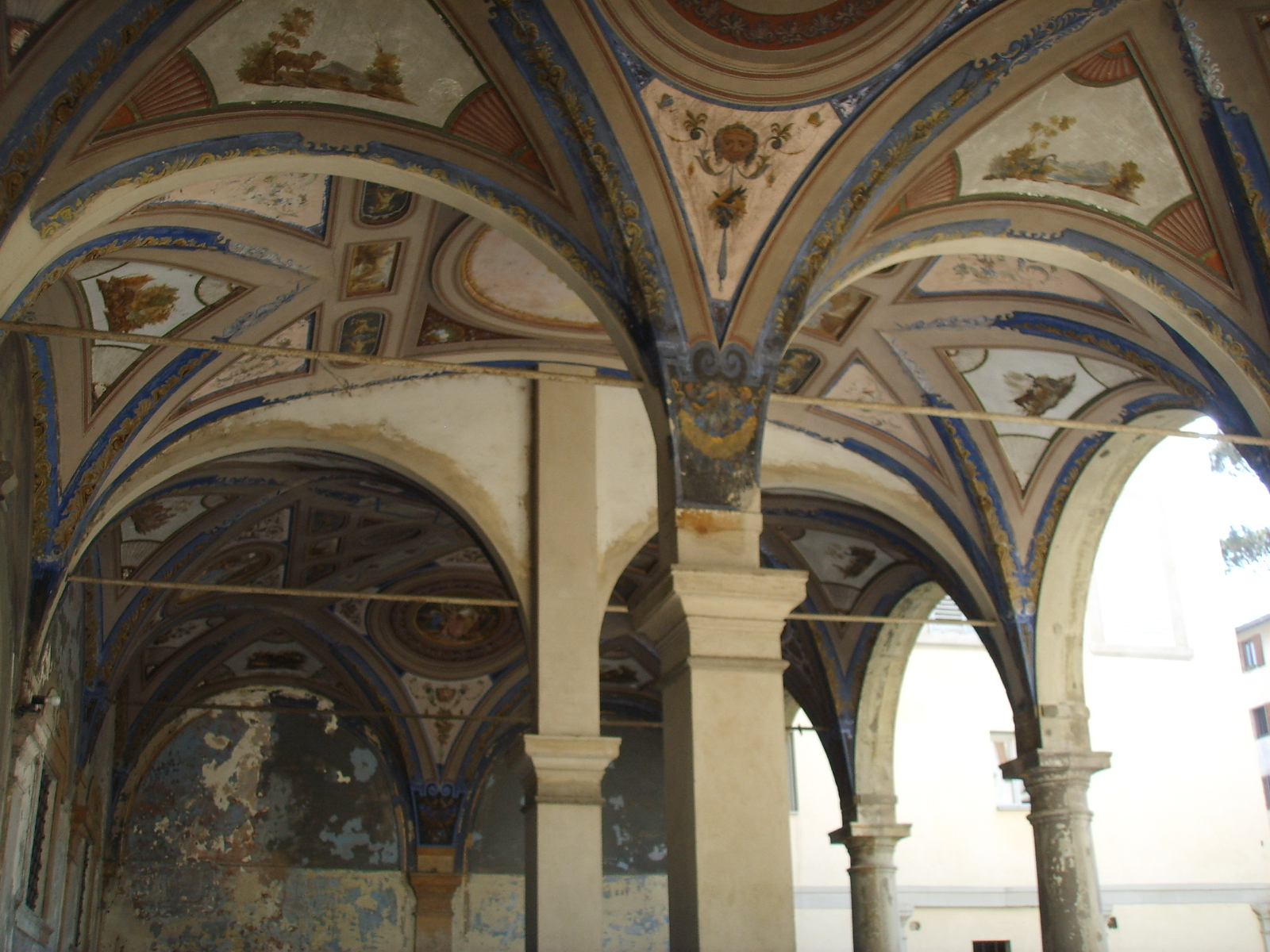
The Lodge

Passed down through hereditary lineage to the Caccini, it was progressively enlarged by them (during the years of prior Francesco Domenico), until a unitary renovation was carried out that literature places between 1561 and 1564 circa and refers to Giovanni Caccini, an intimate of the Medici family (but not to be confused with the architect Giovanni Battista Caccini of Montopoli in Val d'Arno), however assisted by Giorgio Vasari. All that remains of Caccini are the initials G. C. A. [rchitect or Alexandri (son of Alexander)] F.[iorentino or fecit]. carved on some architraves on the ground floor.

The portal (later transformed) is attributed to Bartolomeo Ammannati, but has no relation with the 18th-century relief by Ferdinando Ruggieri that refers to the Palazzo del Cavalier Vernaccia, at the time owner and united to the Caccini by marriage ties. Restoration of the façade in 2022 revealed that the portal of house no. 31 is in the Ammannatesque style, and that the drawing of the portal of house no. 33 is attributable to Pasqui, when he redesigned the façade. The façade, with its slightly broken lines, organised on three floors plus a mezzanine for no less than thirteen axes, is the result of restoration work carried out by the architect Leopoldo Pasqui around 1843, as attested by Federico Fantozzi.

Behind the palace, thanks to Matteo Caccini, a large garden was developed in the early 17th century, known for the rare and exotic plants cultivated (including the first onions, the tuberi della patata), and especially for the flowering plants with species from all the then known world, which for a long time made the garden more famous than the palazzo itself. All that remains of the garden today is a green area, which borders the back of the Teatro della Pergola. After the Caccinis, the palazzo passed to the del Vernaccia family, to the Riccardi and, in the 19th century, to the Del Corona family, the Pasqui Cartoni family and then to the Geddes da Filicaia. Arthur Schopenhauer lived here for a time. The current ownership of the palazzo, divided into flats, is divided between many parties.

«The series of windows in the two upper orders of the façade contributes to the harmony of the façade and helps, together with the slightly curved position and the contrast with the narrowness of the old village. Passing through the central doorway, one enters the five-light ground-floor loggia overlooking the garden, which has four singularly shaped windows with large volutes on the upper sides and interesting frescoes with grotesques and allegorical figures that revolve around the theme of the liberal arts, while in the centre delicate putti hold the coat of arms of the Da Filicaia».

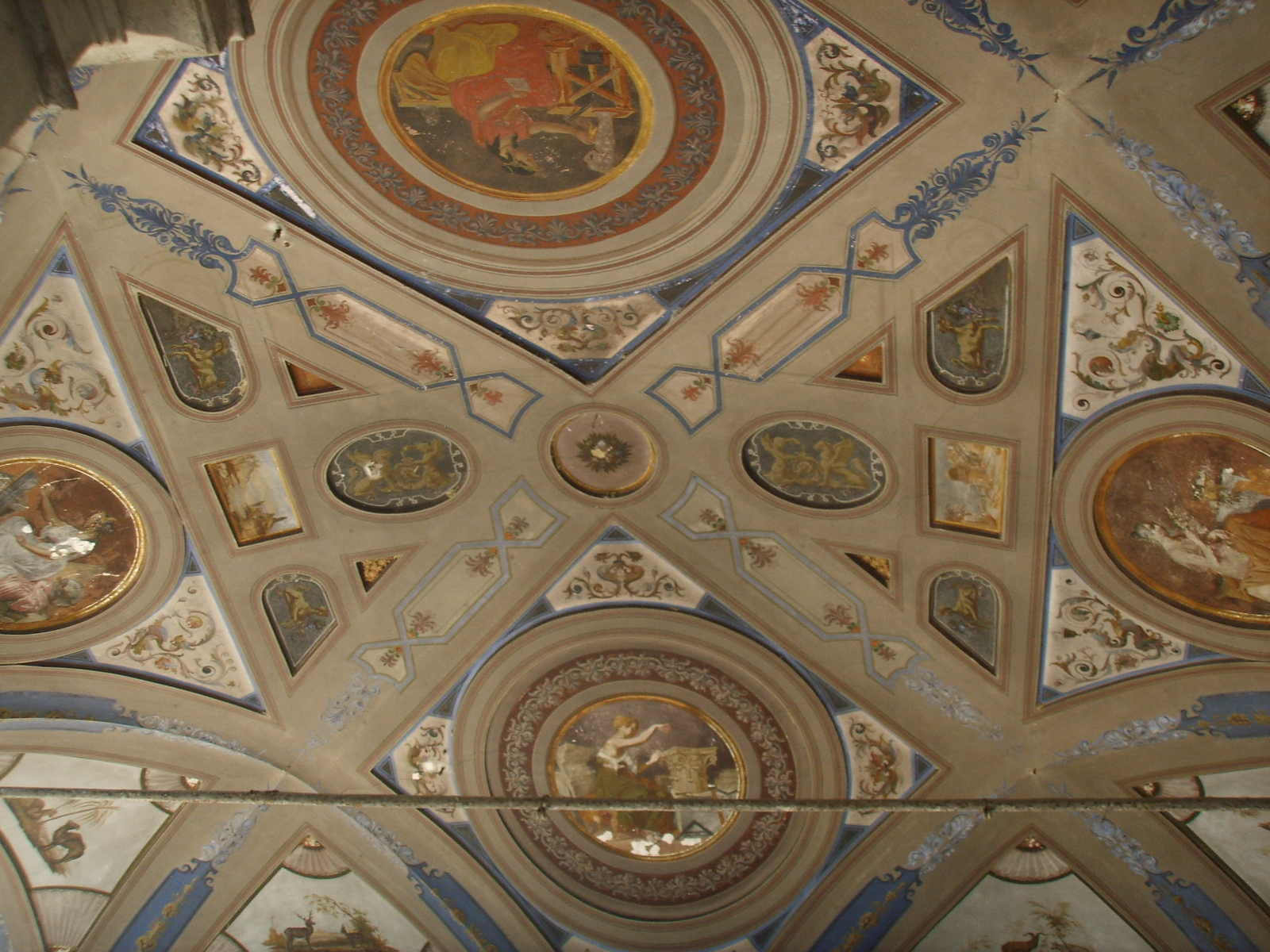
The Lodge

On Via Nuova de' Caccini (house numbers 7–21), the building has a modern addition, added by the architect Rolando Pagnini and built in the early 1970s, despite attempts to oppose the project by Italia Nostra and the momentary closure of the building site in July 1971.

== See also ==
- Palazzo degli Sporti

== Notes ==
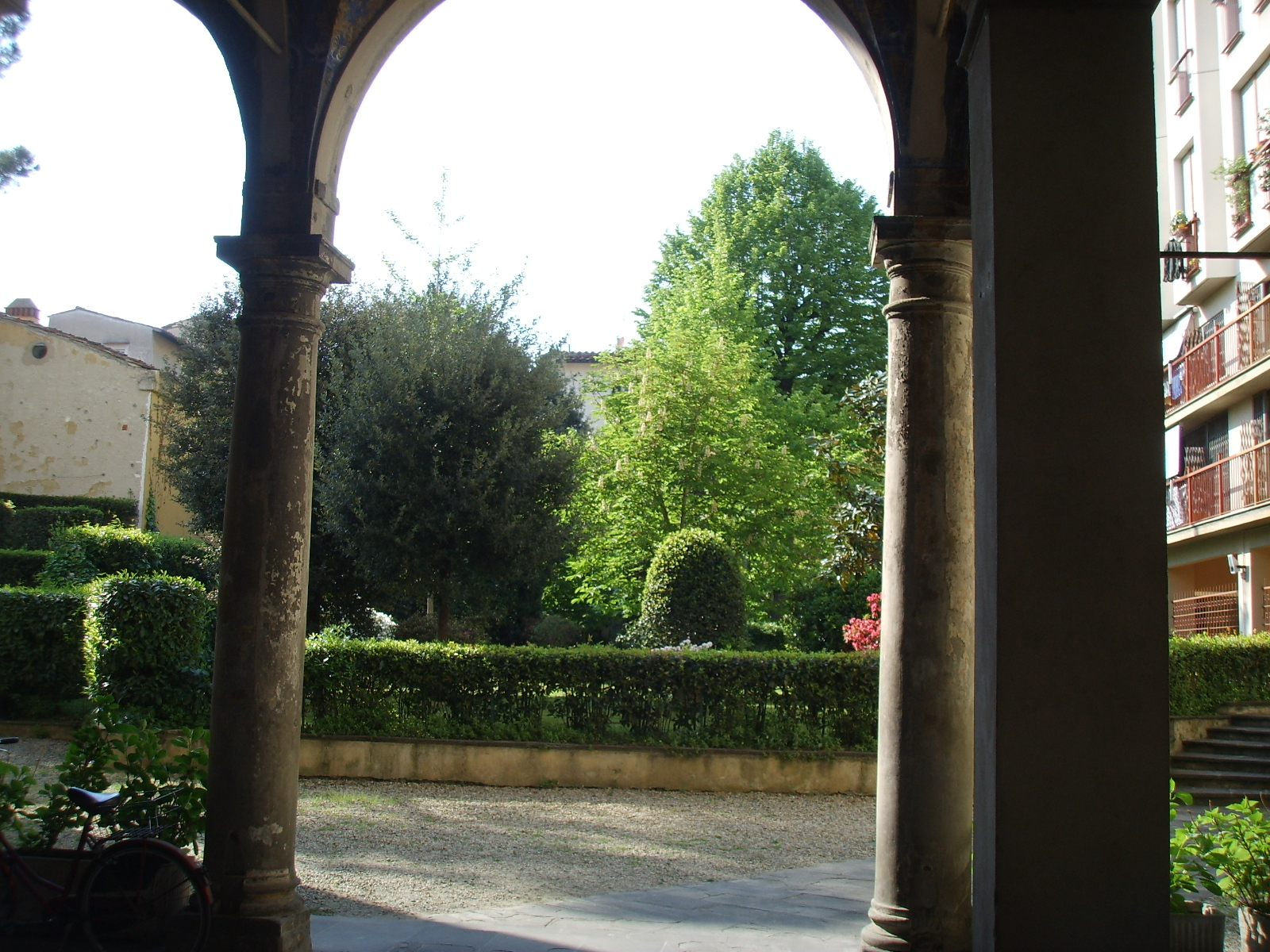
Garden

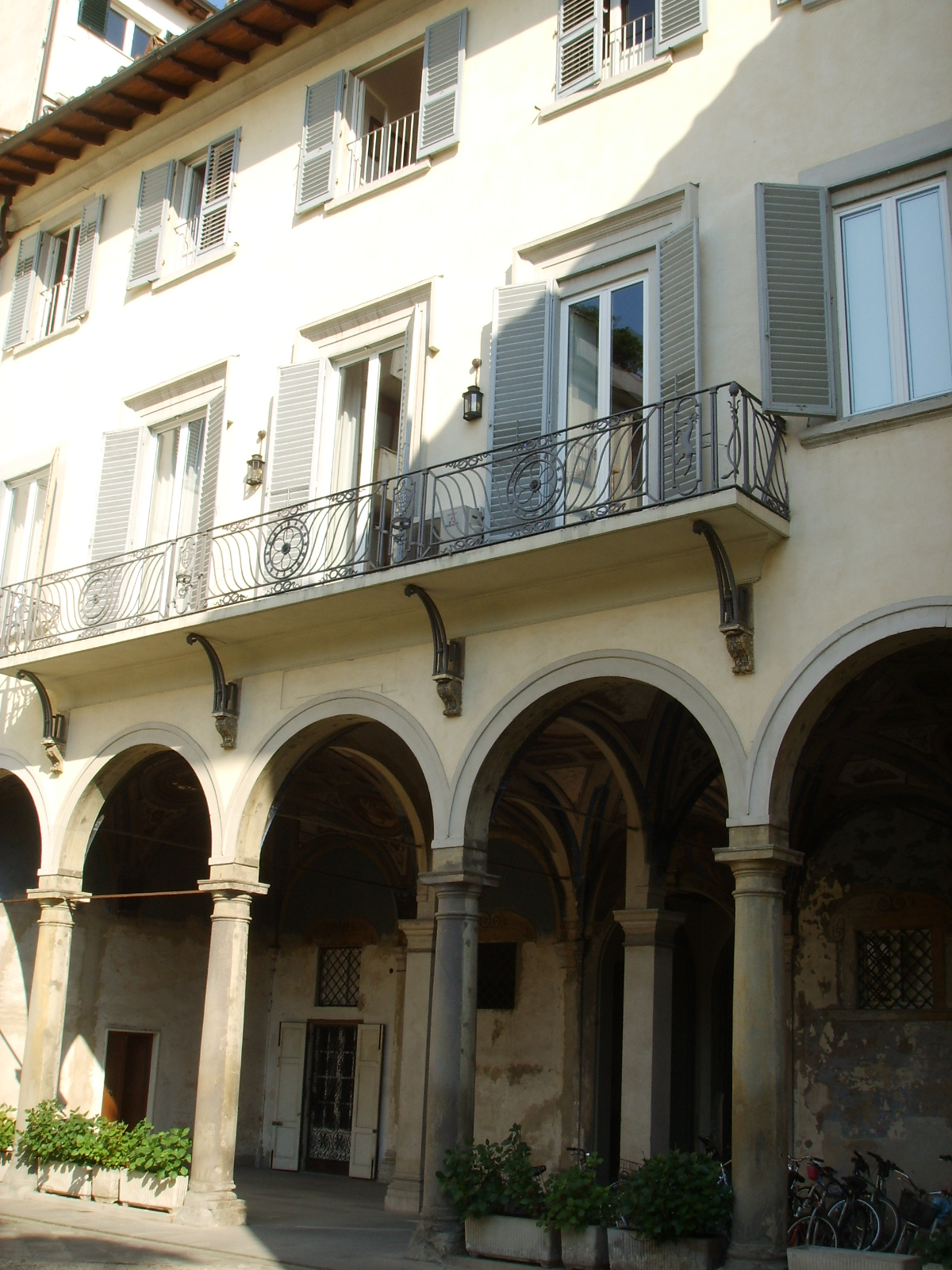
View from the garden

== Bibliography ==
=== Italian sources ===
- Ferdinando Ruggieri, Studio d’architettura civile sopra gli ornamenti di porte, e finestre, colle misure, piante, modini, e profili, tratte da alcune fabbriche insigni di Firenze erette col disegno de’ più celebri architetti, 3 voll., Firenze, nella Stamperia Reale presso Gio. Gaetano Tartini e Santi Franchi, 1722–1728, II, 1724, tavv. 61–65;
- Guida della città di Firenze e suoi contorni con la descrizione della I. e R. Galleria e Palazzo Pitti, Firenze, presso Antonio Campani, 1828, p. 90;
- Federico Fantozzi, Nuova guida ovvero descrizione storico artistico critica della città e contorni di Firenze, Firenze, Giuseppe e fratelli Ducci, 1842, p. 372, n. 123;
- Federico Fantozzi, Pianta geometrica della città di Firenze alla proporzione di 1 a 4500 levata dal vero e corredata di storiche annotazioni, Firenze, Galileiana, 1843, pp. 172–173, n. 412;
- Giuseppe Formigli, Guida per la città di Firenze e suoi contorni, nuova edizione corretta ed accresciuta, Firenze, Carini e Formigli, 1849, p. 87;
- Nuova guida della città di Firenze ossia descrizione di tutte le cose che vi si trovano degne d’osservazione, con piante e vedute, ultima edizione compilata da Giuseppe François, Firenze, Vincenzo Bulli, 1850, pp. 372–373;
- Emilio Bacciotti, Firenze illustrata nella sua storia, famiglie, monumenti, arti e scienze dalla sua origine fino ai nostri tempi, 3 voll., Firenze, Stabilimento Tipografico Mariani e Tipografia Cooperativa, 1879–1886, III, 1886, p. 443;
- Walther Limburger, Die Gebäude von Florenz: Architekten, Strassen und Plätze in alphabetischen Verzeichnissen, Lipsia, F.A. Brockhaus, 1910, n. 202;
- Augusto Garneri, Firenze e dintorni: in giro con un artista. Guida ricordo pratica storica critica, Torino et alt., Paravia & C., s.d. ma 1924, p. 215, n. XLIX;
- Dovrà decidere il Pretore se la costruzione è regolare, in "La Nazione", 29 luglio 1970;
- Polemica sui restauri, in "La Nazione", 19 ottobre 1972;
- Leonardo Ginori Lisci, I palazzi di Firenze nella storia e nell’arte, Firenze, Giunti & Barbèra, 1972, I, pp. 503–505;
- Piero Bargellini, Ennio Guarnieri, Le strade di Firenze, 4 voll., Firenze, Bonechi, 1977–1978, II, 1977, p. 334; III, 1978, pp. 116–117;
- Guida ai giardini urbani di Firenze, a cura di Vincenzo Cazzato e Massimo De Vico Fallani, Firenze, Regione Toscana, s.d. ma 1981, pp. 34–35;
- Mariachiara Pozzana, Firenze: giardini di città, con acquerelli e disegni di Mauro Falzoni, Firenze, FMG Studio Immagini, 1994, pp. 45–46;
- Toscana esclusiva, pubblicazione edita in occasione dell’iniziativa Firenze: cortili e giardini aperti, 18 e 25 maggio 2003, a cura dell’Associazione Dimore Storiche Italiane, Sezione Toscana, testi a cura dell’Associazione Culturale Città Nascosta, Firenze, ADSI, 2003, pp. 16–17;
- Franco Cesati, Le strade di Firenze. Storia, aneddoti, arte, segreti e curiosità della città più affascinante del mondo attraverso 2400 vie, piazze e canti, 2 voll., Roma, Newton & Compton editori, 2005, II, p. 482;
- Touring Club Italiano, Firenze e provincia, Milano, Touring Editore, 2005, p. 421;
- Claudio Paolini, Case e palazzi nel quartiere di Santa Croce a Firenze, Firenze, Paideia, 2008, pp. 164–165, n. 253;
- Andrea Papi, Alcune notizie sulla "Casa Grande" dei Caccini, Paragone Arte n. 86 (713), 2009, pp. 71–75, tav. 46–48;
- Arte moderna e contemporanea nelle dimore storiche, supplemento alla rivista Dimore Storiche, n. 69/1, 2009, pp. 36–37;
- Claudio Paolini, Architetture fiorentine. Case e palazzi nel quartiere di Santa Croce, Firenze, Paideia, 2009, pp. 236–237, n. 337.
- Marco Calafati, Palazzo Caccini. Giorgio Vasari, in Ammannati e Vasari per la città dei Medici, a cura di Cristina Acidini e Giacomo Pirazzoli, Firenze, Polistampa, 2011, p. 198.
