= Sassetti =

Sassetti is a surname of Italian origin. Notable people with the surname include:

- Andrea Sassetti (born 1960), Italian shoe designer and businessman
- Bernardo Sassetti (1970–2012), Portuguese jazz pianist and film composer
- Filippo Sassetti, (1540–1588), Italian merchant
- Francesco Sassetti (1421–1490), Italian banker
- João Sassetti (1892–1946), Portuguese fencer

== See also ==
- Sassetti Chapel, a chapel in the basilica of Santa Trinita, Florence, Italy
