= Palazzo degli Sporti =

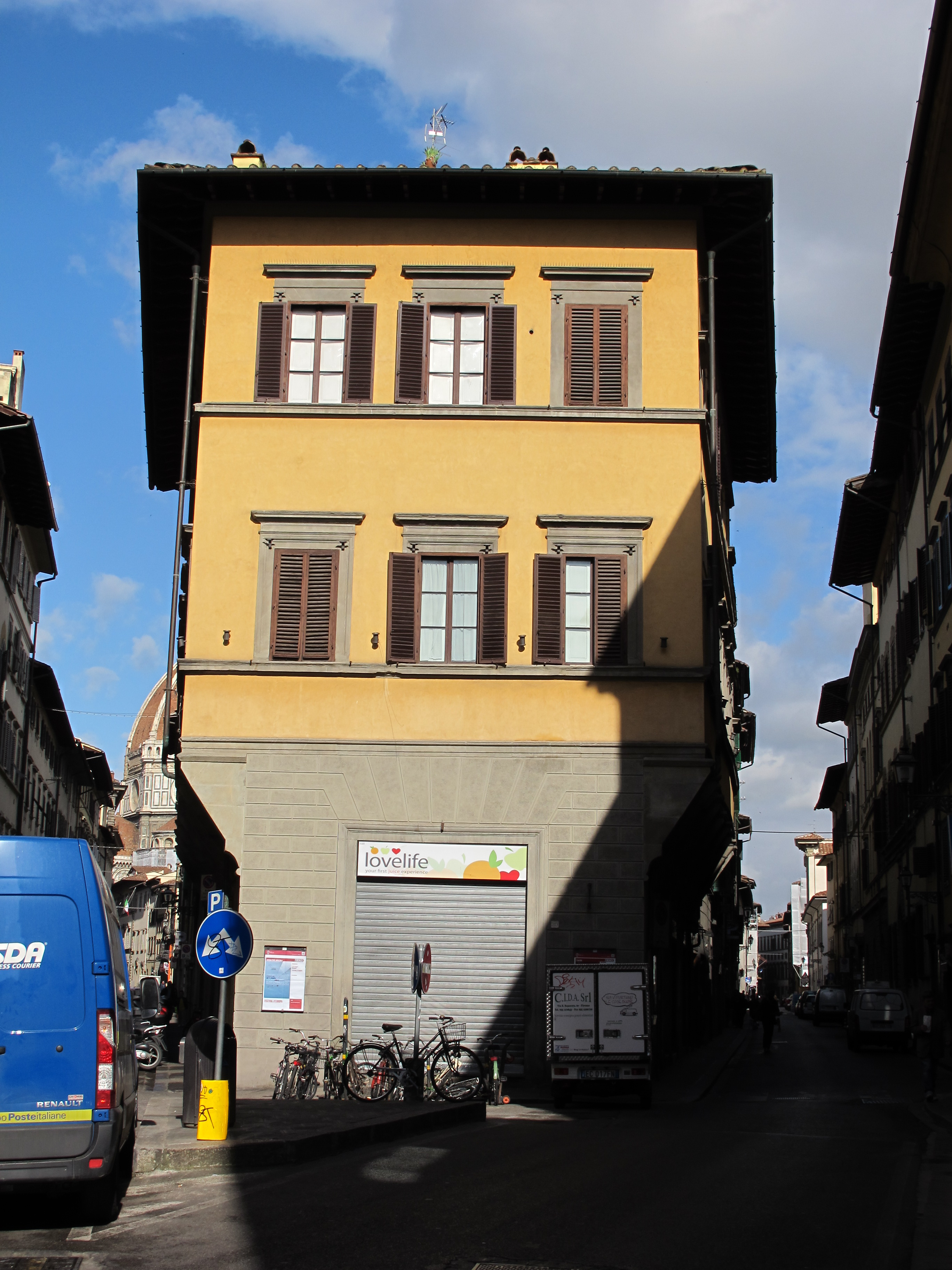
- Palazzo degli Sporti
- Interactive map of the Palazzo degli Sporti area
- Alternative names: Palazzo Busini Ugolini

General information
- Status: In use
- Type: Palace
- Architectural style: Mannerist
- Location: Florence, Toscana, Italy, 10, via dell'Oriuolo angolo via Sant'Egidio
- Coordinates: 43.771939°N 11.261606°E
- Construction started: 15th century (ca. 1532)

Palazzo degli Sporti, or Busini Ugolini, is a civic building in the historical centre of Florence, located between Via dell'Oriuolo 10 and Via Sant'Egidio in Florence, in front of an unnamed small square near the San Pierino arch that leads to Borgo Pinti.

The palace appeared in a 1901 list drawn up by the Italian General Directorate of Antiquities and Fine Arts (what is now known as Direzione generale Archeologia, belle arti e paesaggio) as a monumental building to be considered a piece of national artistic heritage.

== History and description ==
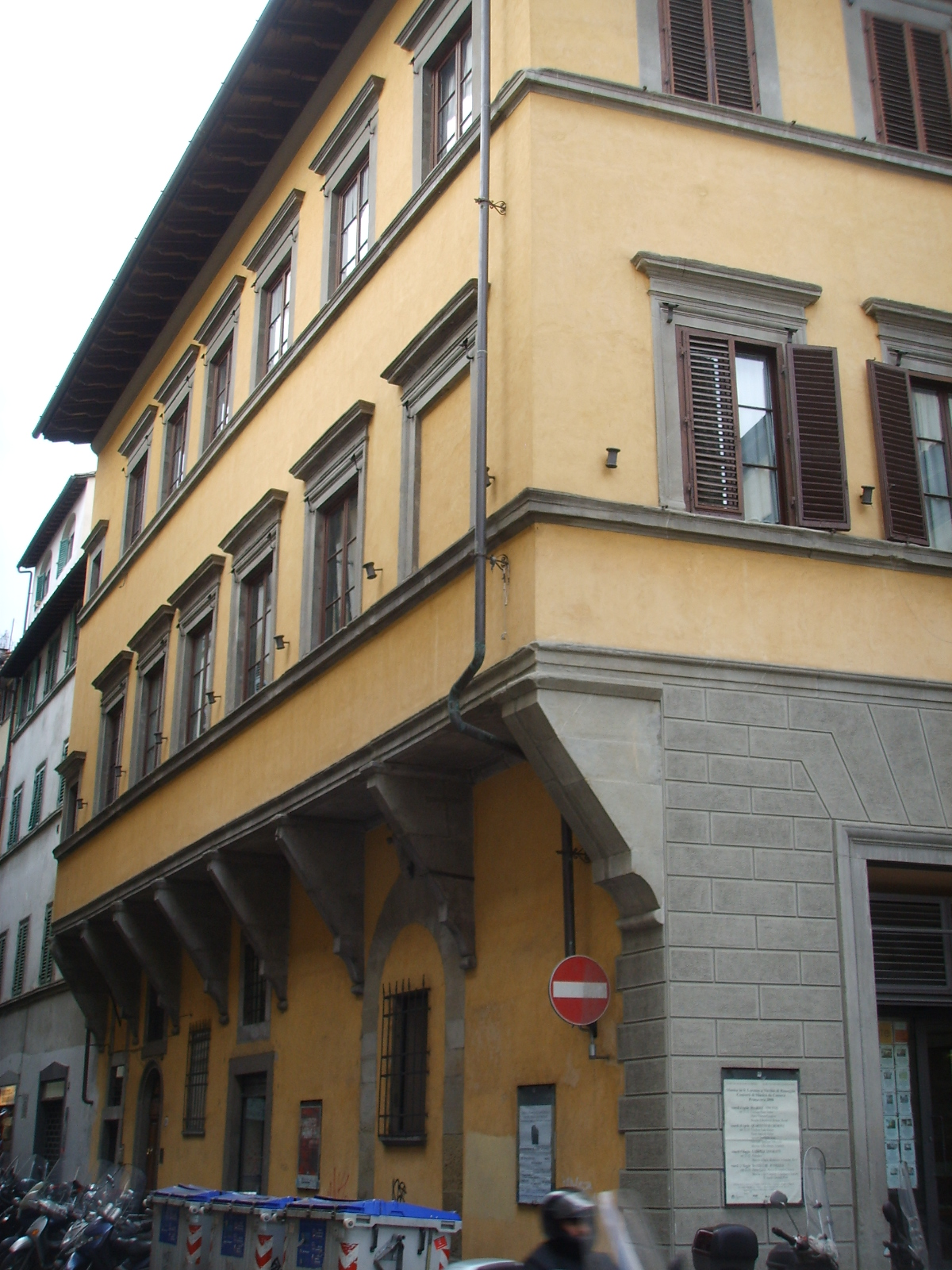
The 'sporti' on corbels along via dell'Oriuolo

The three-storey building, dating back to the 16th century, overlooks both Via dell’Oriuolo and Via Sant’Egidio with its façades with «sporti» on corbels, which are such a distinctive feature that they have given the building its current name. This area houses the ancient homes of the Albizi family which were sold in 1508 when they were almost ruins by Filippo di Michele da Nipozzano (Albizi) to Anton Francesco degli Albizi. Luca, his son, built the palace in its present form around 1532. Over a course of time, the property passed from the Albizi family to the Orlandi family (who were creditors of the Albizi family), then to the Busini family who later inherited it from a nun of the family of the monastery of Santa Caterina al Monte, known as San Gaggio. This proprietorship is marked by the Wheel flanked by the palms of martyrdom that recurs on the doors, now closed, looking both onto via Sant’Egidio and via dell’Oriuolo, as a symbol of St. Catherine of Alexandria.

In the 19th century, the palazzo underwent a chamfer renovation towards Piazza Salvemini to attenuate the sharpness of the sprone which, due to the projections on brackets, made it resemble the prow of a ship. The new façade on this short side, with the exception of the ground floor treated with faux rusticated ashlar in a manner decidedly typical of that period, does not, however, interrupt the unity of the design of the elevations of the upper floors, indicating that the chamfer must have affected only a low building body that presumably determined the sprone with a terrace.

In this house, in 1631, the Bolognese man of letters Agostino Coltellini formed a sodality with the aim of bringing together «in virtuous conversation» the young people who had emerged from the school of Humanities, which from 1635 became the Academy of Apatists. A tradition attributes, without foundation, the palace to Michelangelo Buonarroti, or doubtfully to Baccio d'Agnolo.

The building is currently in good condition following a recent restoration.

== Bibliography ==
=== Italian sources ===
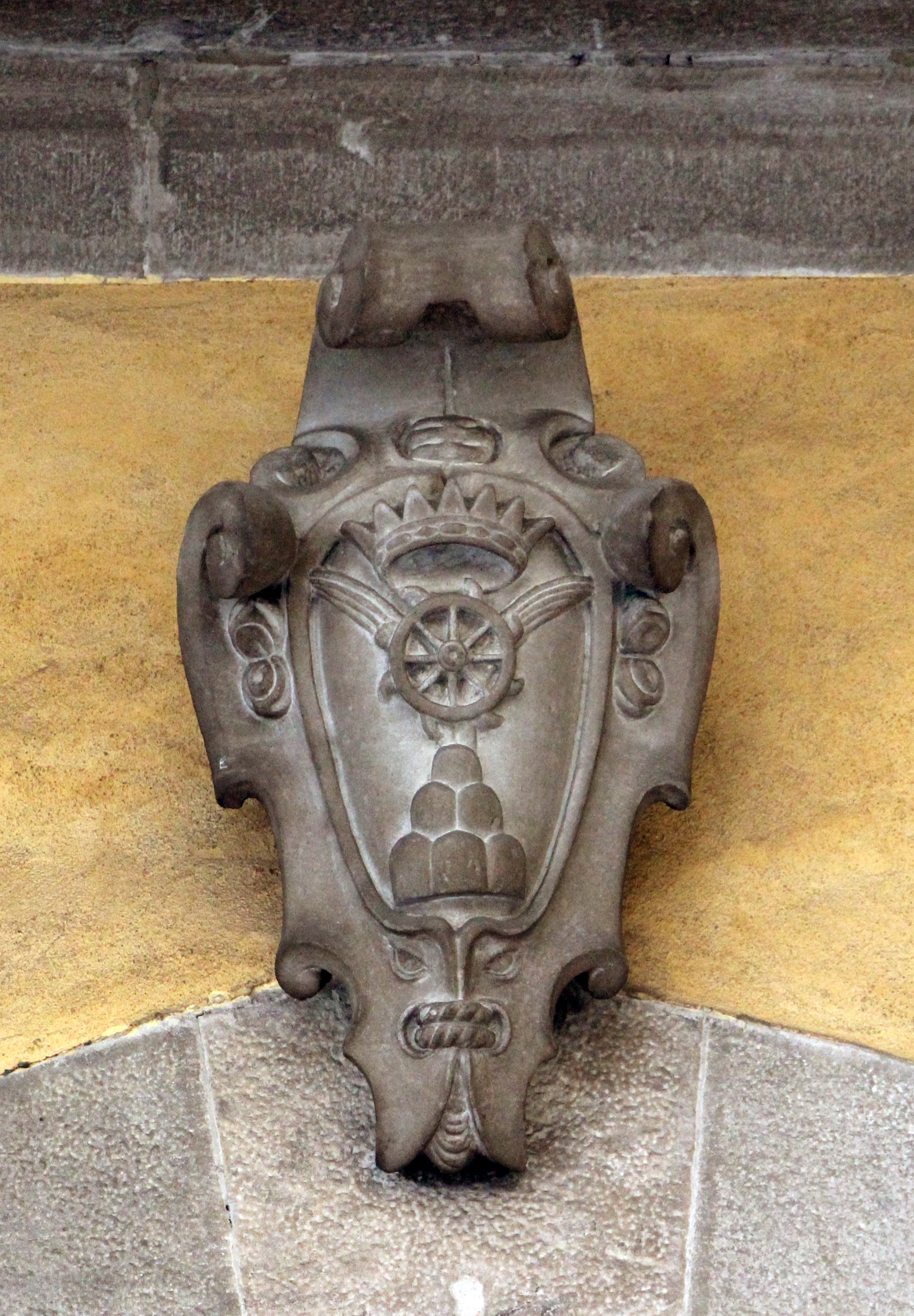
Coat of arms of the Monastery of San Gaggio

- Marco Lastri, Casa degli Sporti in via dell'Orivolo, luogo di fondazione dell'Accademia degli Apatisti, in L'Osservatore fiorentino sugli edifizi della sua Patria, quarta edizione eseguita sopra quella del 1821 con aumenti e correzioni del Sig. Cav. Prof. Giuseppe Del Rosso, Firenze, Giuseppe Celli, 1831, III, pp. 87–90;
- Federico Fantozzi, Nuova guida ovvero descrizione storico artistico critica della città e contorni di Firenze, Firenze, Giuseppe e fratelli Ducci, 1842, p. 370, n. 119;
- Federico Fantozzi, Pianta geometrica della città di Firenze alla proporzione di 1 a 4500 levata dal vero e corredata di storiche annotazioni, Firenze, Galileiana, 1843, p. 154, n. 356;
- Nuova guida della città di Firenze ossia descrizione di tutte le cose che vi si trovano degne d’osservazione, con piante e vedute, ultima edizione compilata da Giuseppe François, Firenze, Vincenzo Bulli, 1850, p. 235;
- L’illustratore fiorentino. Calendario storico per l’anno ..., a cura di Guido Carocci, Firenze, Tipografia Domenicana, 1880, pp. 119–120;
- Emilio Bacciotti, Firenze illustrata nella sua storia, famiglie, monumenti, arti e scienze dalla sua origine fino ai nostri tempi, 3 voll., Firenze, Stabilimento Tipografico Mariani e Tipografia Cooperativa, 1879–1886, III, 1886, p. 395;
- Carl von Stegmann, Heinrich von Geymüller, Die Architektur der Renaissance in Toscana: dargestellt in den hervorragendsten Kirchen, Palästen, Villen und Monumenten, 11 voll., München, Bruckmann, 1885–1908, X, p. 6;
- Ministero della Pubblica Istruzione (Direzione Generale delle Antichità e Belle Arti), Elenco degli Edifizi Monumentali in Italia, Roma, Tipografia ditta Ludovico Cecchini, 1902, p. 252;
- Guido Carocci, I Tabernacoli di Firenze, in "Arte e Storia", XXIV, 1905, 11/12, pp. 87–89.
- Walther Limburger, Die Gebäude von Florenz: Architekten, Strassen und Plätze in alphabetischen Verzeichnissen, Lipsia, F.A. Brockhaus, 1910, n. 136;
- L’illustratore fiorentino. Calendario storico per l’anno ..., a cura di Guido Carocci, Firenze, Tipografia Domenicana, (1915) 1914, pp. 79–81;
- I Palazzi fiorentini. Quartiere di San Giovanni, introduzione di Piero Bargellini, schede dei palazzi di Marcello Jacorossi, Firenze, Comitato per l’Estetica Cittadina, 1972, p. 196, n. 376;
- Piero Bargellini, Ennio Guarnieri, Le strade di Firenze, 4 voll., Firenze, Bonechi, 1977–1978, I, 1977, p. 327; II, 1977, p. 349;
- Franco Cesati, Le strade di Firenze. Storia, aneddoti, arte, segreti e curiosità della città più affascinante del mondo attraverso 2400 vie, piazze e canti, 2 voll., Roma, Newton & Compton editori, 2005, II, pp. 435, 570;
- Claudio Paolini, Case e palazzi nel quartiere di Santa Croce a Firenze, Firenze, Paideia, 2008, pp. 133–134, n. 199;
- Claudio Paolini, Architetture fiorentine. Case e palazzi nel quartiere di Santa Croce, Firenze, Paideia, 2009, pp. 202–203, n. 279.
