= Rubén Adorno =

Puerto Rican basketball player

Rubén Adorno (born 3 August 1941 in Corozal) is a Puerto Rican former basketball player who competed in the 1964 Summer Olympics and in the 1968 Summer Olympics.
