= Adorno traffic light =

Traffic light in Frankfurt, Germany

Coordinates: 50°07′06″N 8°39′11″E

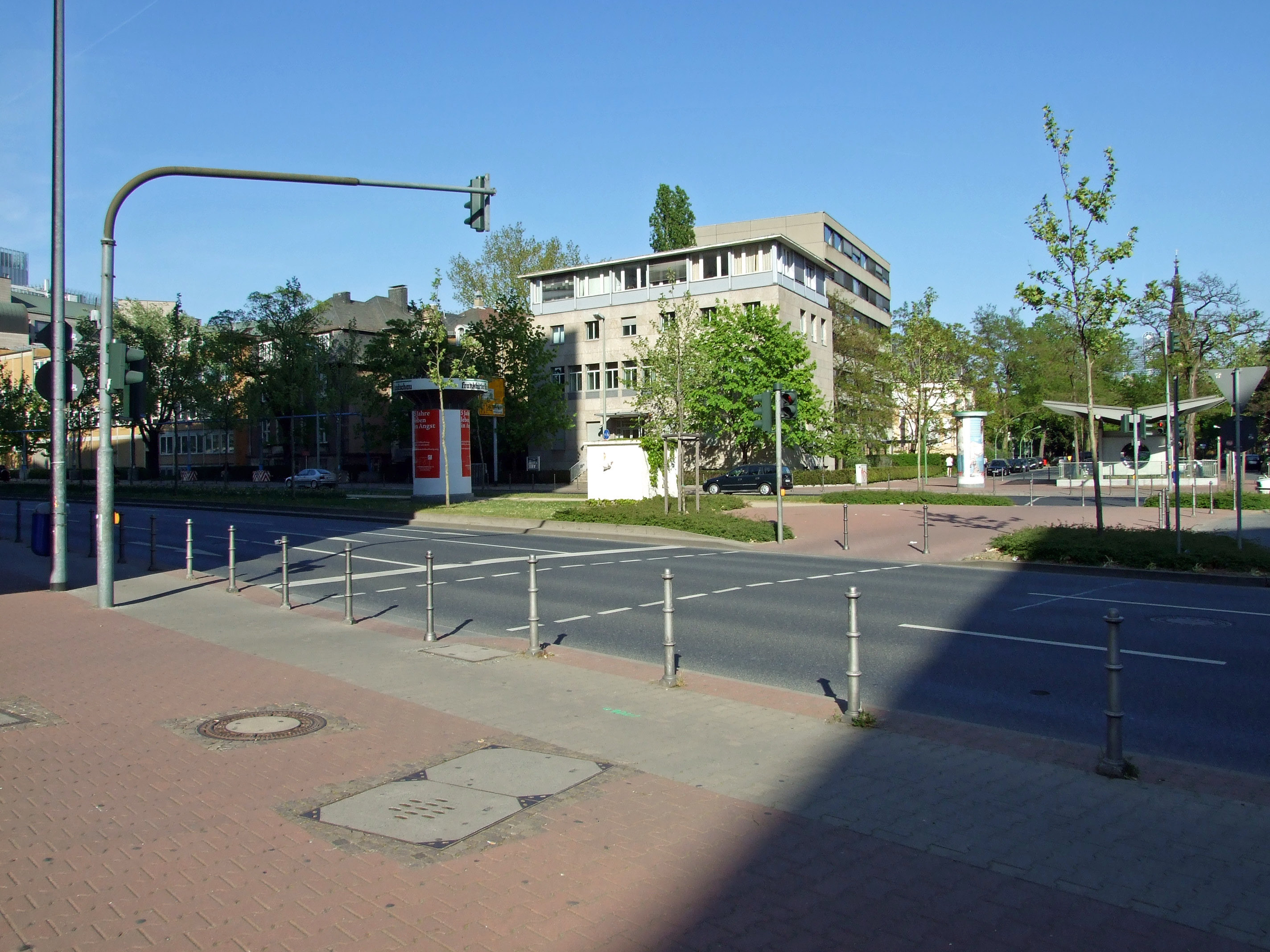
Adorno traffic light next to the Institute for Social Research in Frankfurt

The Adorno traffic light (German: Adorno-Ampel) is a traffic light artefact in Frankfurt, which has become one of the city's landmarks. The traffic light is located on Senckenberganlage, a street which divides the Institute for Social Research from Goethe University Frankfurt. Local intellectual figure Theodor W. Adorno requested its construction after a pedestrian death in 1962, and it was finally installed posthumously 25 years later.

== History ==
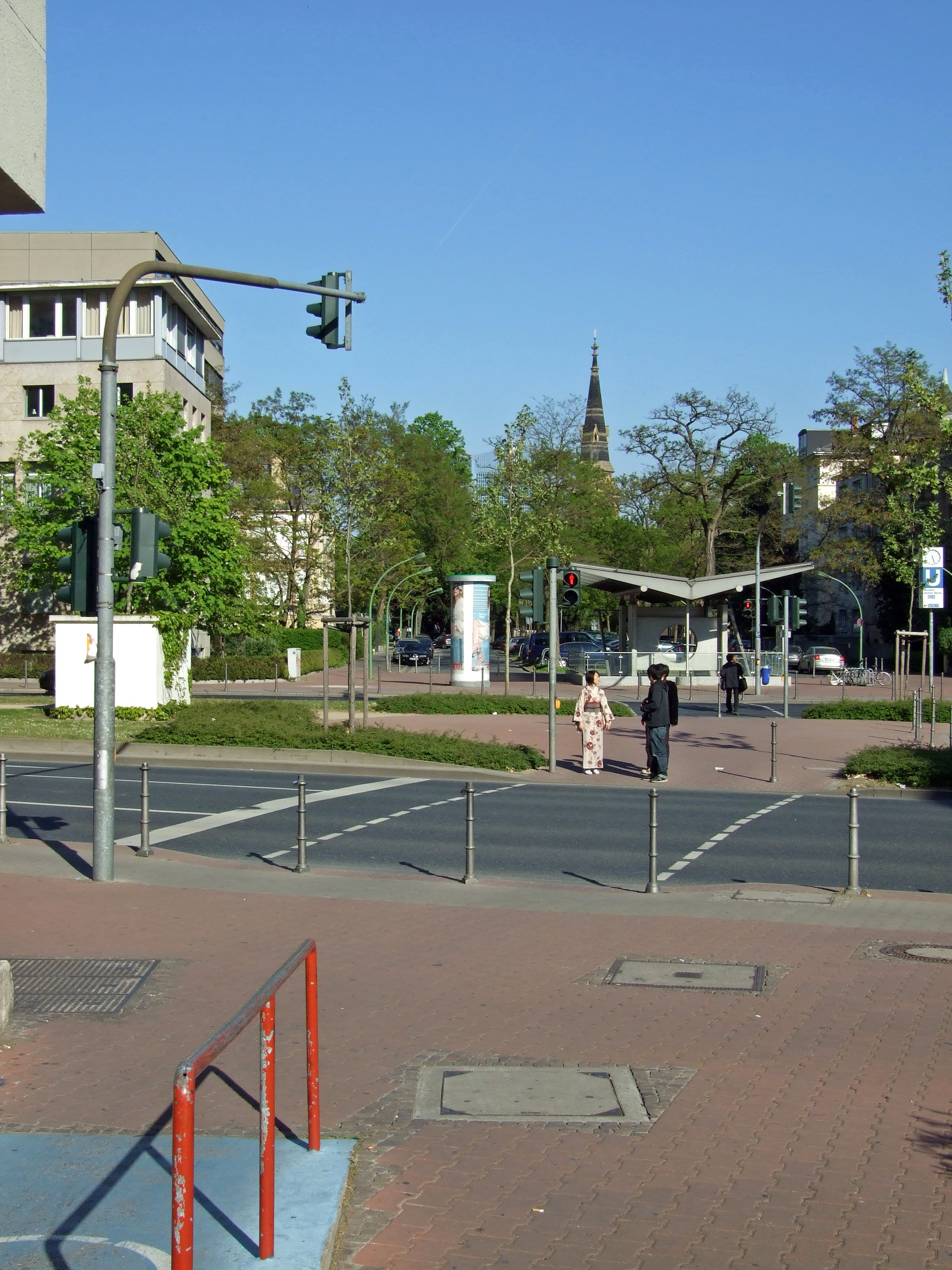
Adorno traffic lights

In 1951 the Institute for Social Research moved into a new building on Senckenberganlage.

On March 12, 1958, Adorno wrote a letter to the University outlining dangers of crossing the street, which led to police chief Gerhard Littmann marking a pedestrian crossing.

On November 29, 1961, Adorno demanded "a bridge for pedestrians over the Senckenberganlage or a diversion of all traffic".

In 1962 a person was killed in a traffic accident in the Senckenberganlage area, which led to Adorno writing to the Frankfurter Allgemeine Zeitung demanding "traffic lights in the whole university area":

When crossing the Senckenberganlage, near the corner of Dantestrasse, one of our secretaries was run over and seriously injured after a passer-by had had a fatal accident at the same place a few days earlier. On the way to university you have to run across the street in an unworthy manner as if you were running for your life. Should a student, or a professor, find himself in the state that is actually appropriate for him, namely in thought, then there is an immediate threat of death.

— Theodor W. Adorno

Adorno's demand was fulfilled 18 years after his death. In 1985 Jürgen Habermas (director of the institute) campaigned for the traffic lights. In 1987, Habermas' successor, Ludwig von Friedeburg, placed a pedestrian traffic light at the Senckenberg plant, which was named the "Adorno traffic light" after its proponent.

The Adorno traffic light has developed into a tourist attraction in Frankfurt.

== Literature ==
- Michael Maaser : A bridge over the Senckenberganlage. Adorno and the University of Frankfurt . In: Research Frankfurt . No. 3-4 / 2003, ISSN 0175-0992, p. 48–51 ( uni-frankfurt.de [PDF; 1.4 MB; accessed on February 21, 2019]).
- Wolfram Schütte (Ed.): Adorno in Frankfurt. A kaleidoscope with texts and pictures . 1st edition. Suhrkamp, Frankfurt am Main 2003, ISBN 3-518-58379-4, pp. 236–240: The Adorno traffic light; P. 241: Frankfurter Rundschau, June 6, 1987: […] traffic light as Adorno memorial .
- Richard Deiss: Adorno traffic light and suspension railway elephant. 222 little traffic anecdotes on everything that moves us . BoD, Norderstedt 2010, ISBN 978-3-8334-9584-7 .
- Frank Berger, Christian Setzepfandt : 101 non-locations in Frankfurt . New edition. Societäts-Verlag, Frankfurt am Main 2011, ISBN 978-3-7973-1248-8 . [7]
- Stuart Walton: Neglected or Misunderstood. Introducing Theodor Adorno . Zero Books, Winchester (United Kingdom) 2017, ISBN 978-1-78535-382-6, pp. 31–32 (English, limited preview in Google Book Search).
