= Omar Adorno =

Puerto Rican boxer

Personal information
- Nationality: Puerto Rican
- Born: 1 August 1972 (age 52); Morovis, Puerto Rico
- Height: 1.60 m (5 ft 3 in)
- Weight: 51 kg (112 lb)

Sport
- Sport: Boxing

Omar Adorno (born 1 August 1972) is a Puerto Rican boxer. He competed in the 1996 Summer Olympics.
