= Palazzo Adorni =

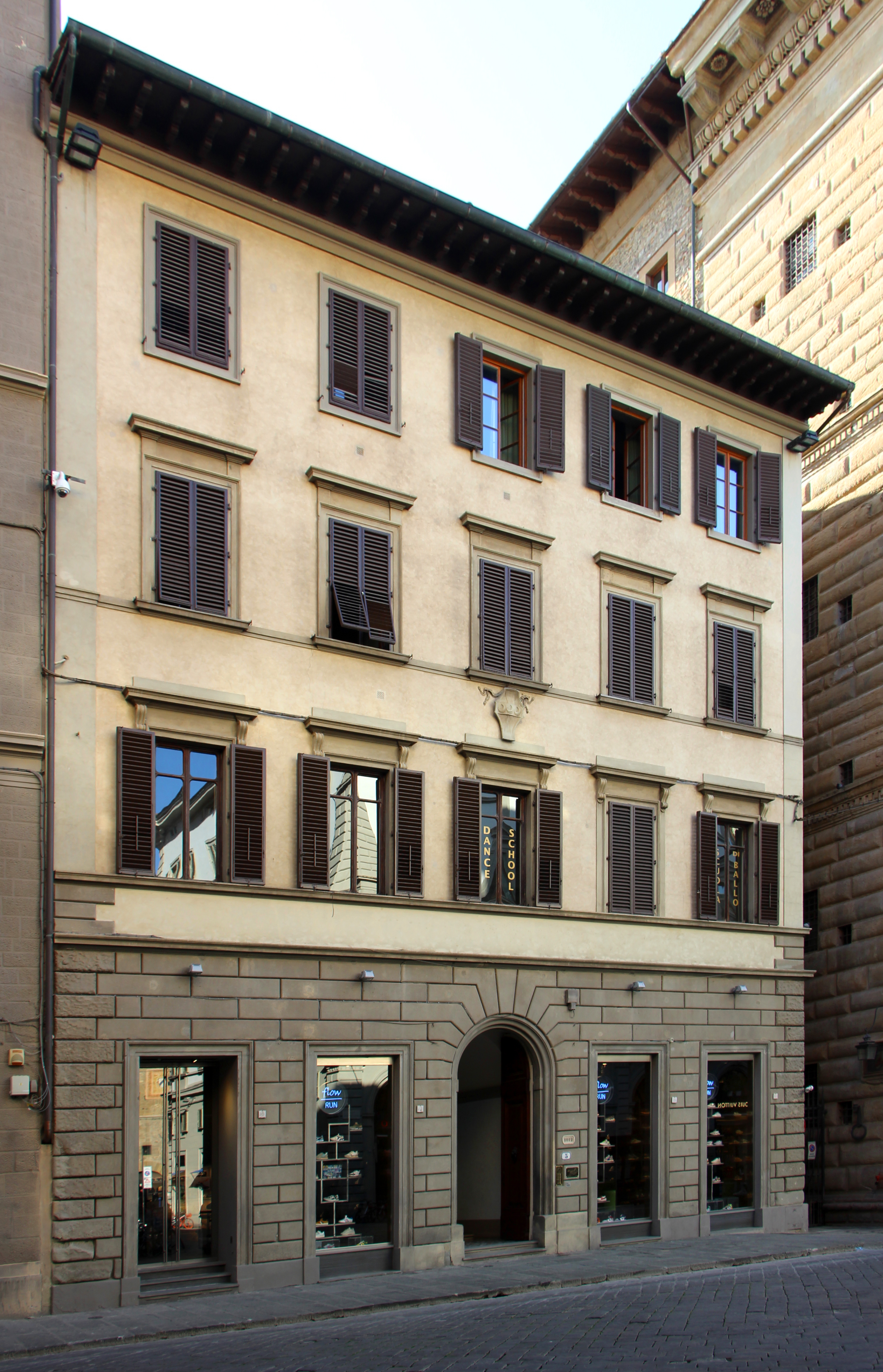
- Facade Palazzo Adorni
- Interactive map of the Palazzo Adorni area

General information
- Status: In use
- Type: Palace
- Architectural style: Mannerist
- Location: Florence, Tuscany, Italy, 5, Piazza degli Strozzi
- Coordinates: 43.77105°N 11.252086°E
- Construction started: 15th century

Palazzo Adorni is a building in the historical centre of Florence, located at Piazza degli Strozzi 5.

== History and description ==
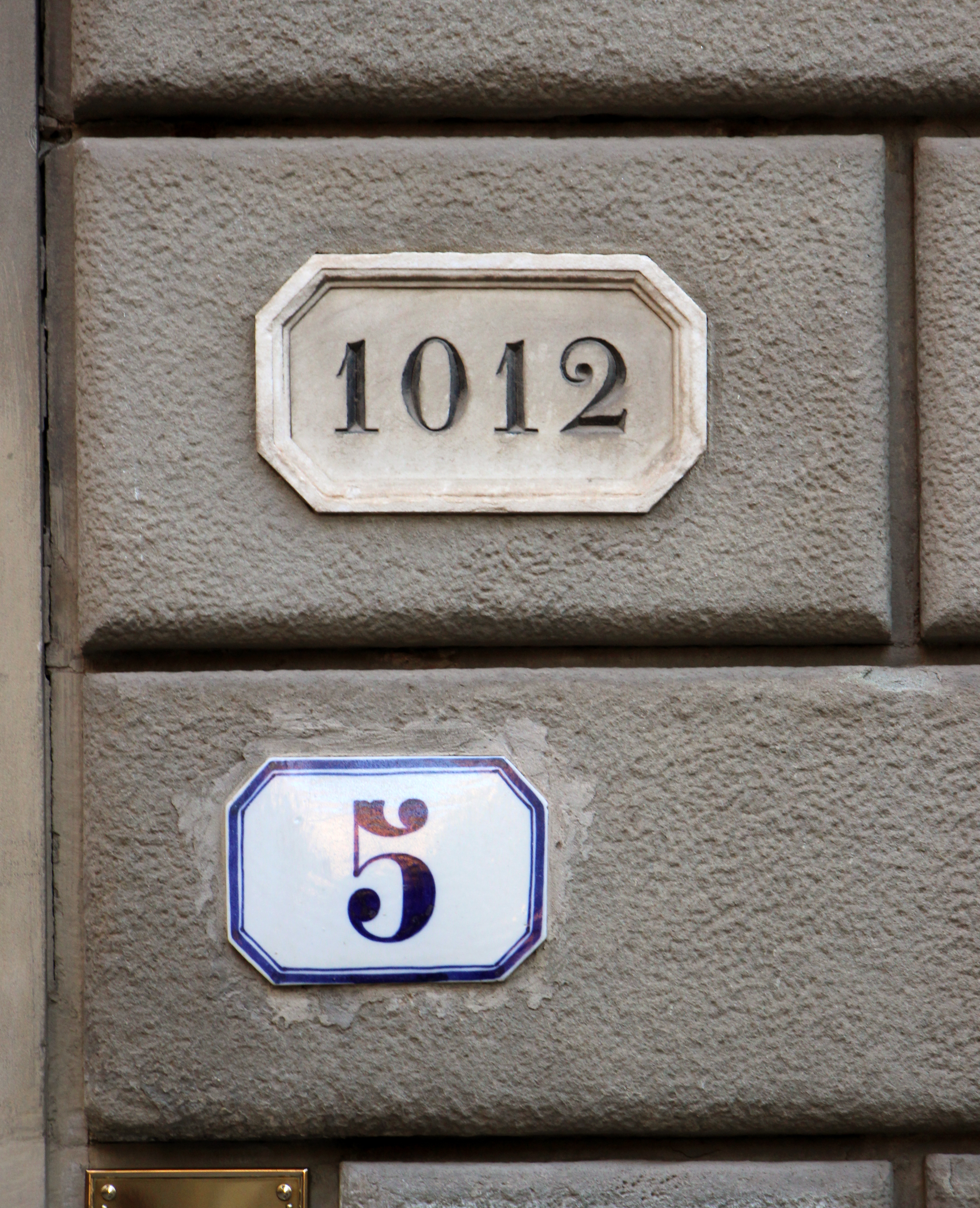
Napoleonic and current civic numbering

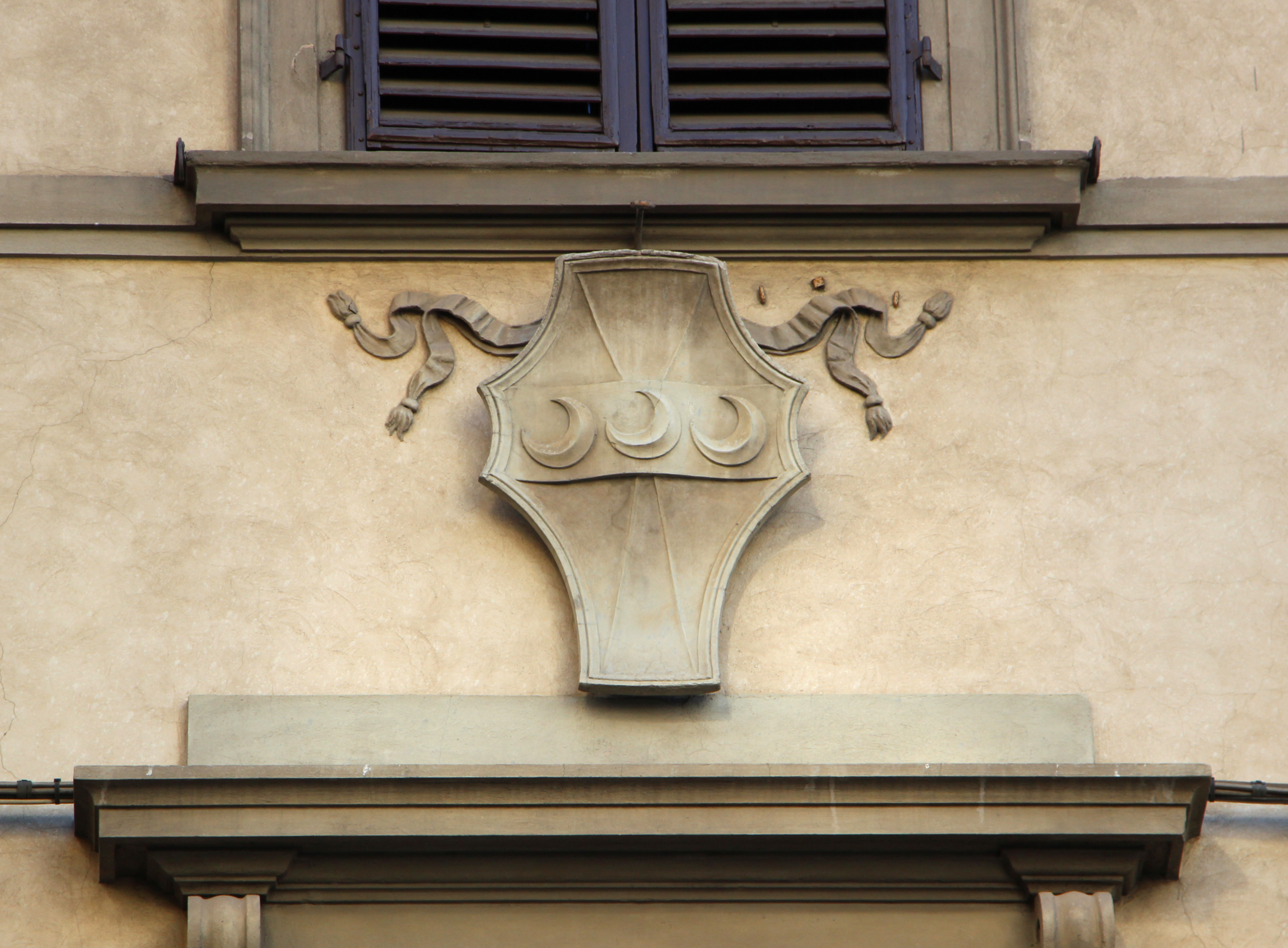
The Strozzi coat of arms

This is a four-storey building arranged on five axes, of late 19th-century style which, in deference to the character of the square (and also because of its proximity to the Palazzo Strozzi, from which it is separated by a chiasso), flaunts a bugne facing in artificial stone throughout the height of the ground.

At the centre of the front is a shield with the coat of arms of the Strozzi family, without enamels (at the fascia charged with three growing faces in band), to which the building belonged, as on the other hand did all the factories on this side of the piazza.

Of its original design, a relief datable to around 1495 regarding the buildings around the square, traced back to Giuliano da Sangallo and Benedetto da Maiano (a reproduction is preserved in the Historical Archive of the City of Florence).

Next to the current house number is a marble plaque with the Napoleonic numbering, which identifies it as 1012: it is one of the few still visible in the city, and the fact that it is engraved in a marble plaque, rather than painted on the door, was typical of the most aristocratic residences.

With regard to the alley of the Strozzi that separates the building from the monumental bulk of Palazzo Strozzi, Bargellini and Guarnieri's repertory remembers: 'The present Palazzo Adorno is divided from Palazzo Strozzi by an alleyway that reaches as far as Via de' Tornabuoni, but which once, halfway down, joined the alleyway of which the last section remains, in Vicolo de' Soldanieri, on the side of Via Porta Rossa. From the surveys made by architect Emilio Dori, the alley widened into a small square now covered and occupied by a café. The Committee for Aesthetics worked at the time, for the reopening of both Vicolo degli Strozzi and the continuation of Vicolo de' Soldanieri, as well as the clearing of the small square, with the creation of a very evocative environment. Incredibly, this project was stubbornly opposed by the owners of Palazzo Strozzi".

== See also ==
- Palazzo Adorni Braccesi
- Palazzo Caccini

== Sources ==
=== Italian sources ===
- Piero Bargellini, Ennio Guarnieri, Le strade di Firenze, 4 voll., Firenze, Bonechi, 1977–1978, IV, 1978, p. 134.
