= Palazzo Adorni Braccesi =

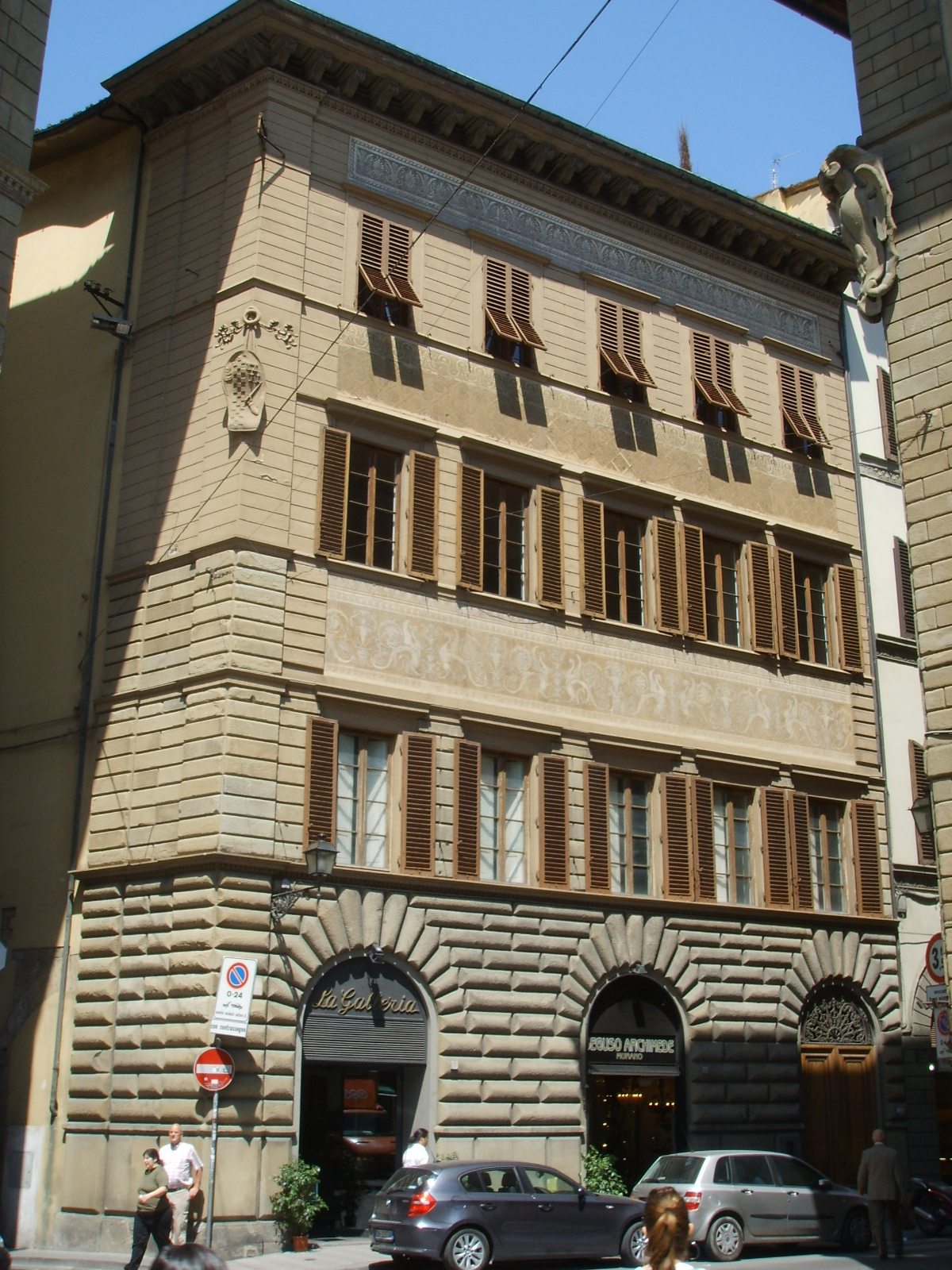
- Palazzo Adorni Braccesi
- Interactive map of the Palazzo Adorni Braccesi area

General information
- Status: In use
- Type: Palace
- Architectural style: Mannerist
- Location: Florence, Tuscany, Italy, 1 via de' Rondinelli
- Coordinates: 43.772944°N 11.251425°E
- Construction started: 15th century

Palazzo Adorni Braccesi is located in Florence in Via de' Rondinelli 1, separated from the narrow Via del Trebbio by Palazzo Antinori.

== History ==
The palace dates back to the 15th century and bears the coat of arms of the Adorni counts on its cantonment. In the 19th century, the Adorni Braccesi family had it considerably remodelled.

The façade is characterised by four orders. On the ground floor it presents a solid rusticated rustic (projecting) type, above a smooth plinth, with three round-headed portals, framed by large stone bosses arranged in a diamond pattern. Beyond the string-course cornice is the first row of windows with architrave. The second floor has a graffito-painted frieze between the stringcourse and the stringcourse, with five windows similar to those on the first floor. The top floor has a simpler frieze at the base, frameless openings and an upper frieze with palmettes and plant elements. The whole is crowned by an eaves cornice with sculpted corbels. On the sides, the corners are highlighted by the slightly protruding smooth ashlar.

== Other images ==
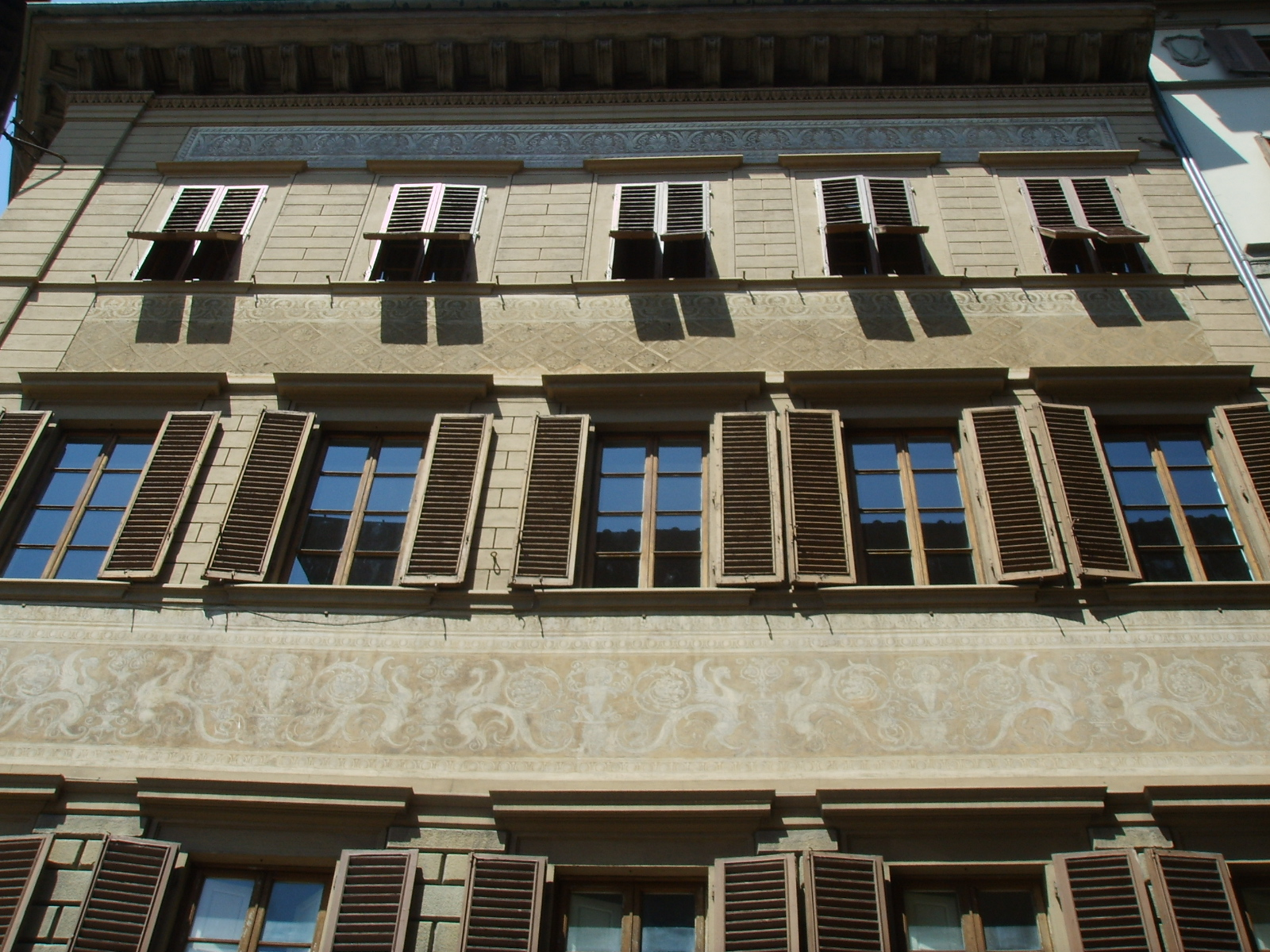
The graffiti on the facade

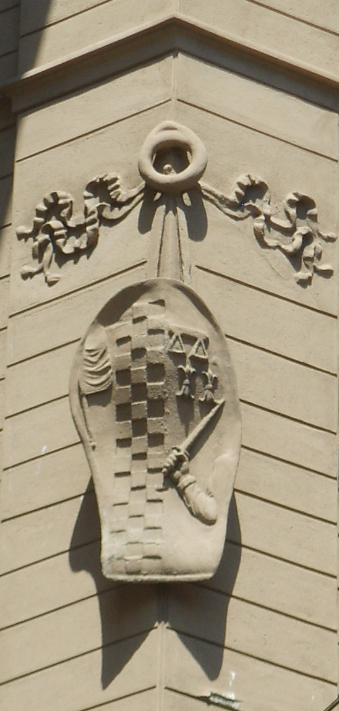
The coat of arms

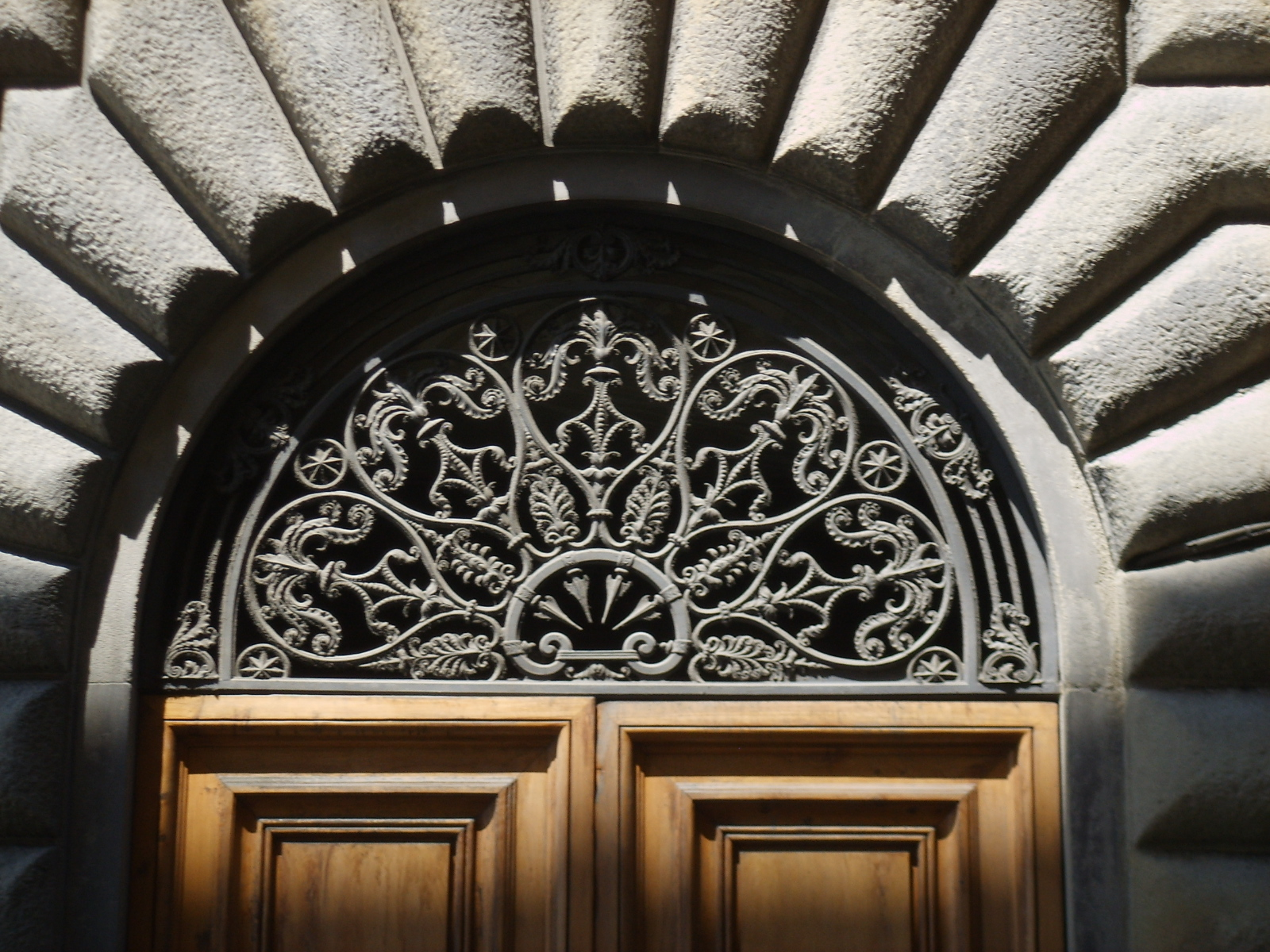
Wrought iron lunette of a portal

== See also ==
- Palazzo Adorni
- Palazzo Anselmi Ristori

== Sources ==
=== Italian sources ===
- Francesco Cesati, La grande guida delle strade di Firenze, Newton Compton Editori, Roma 2003.
- Il ritratto romano del palazzo già Adorni Braccesi e i reimpieghi di materiali antichi a Cascina ISBN 9788889053300.
