= Lorenzo Adorni =

Italian footballer

Personal information
- Date of birth: 1 December 1998 (age 27)
- Place of birth: Parma, Italy
- Height: 1.80 m (5 ft 11 in)
- Position: Right back

Team information
- Current team: SSD Futura Fornovo Medesano

Youth career
- 2011–2015: Parma

Senior career*
Years	Team	Apps	(Gls)
2015–2019	Parma	12	(0)
2016–2019	→ Monza (loan)	48	(1)
2019–2021	Vis Pesaro	4	(0)
2020	→ Imolese (loan)	0	(0)
2021–2022	Fossano	50	(7)
2022	Tolentino	13	(0)
2022–2023	Nola	12	(0)
2023	Borgo San Donnino	1	(0)
2023–	SSD Futura Fornovo Medesano		
- * Club domestic league appearances and goals as of 26 September 2026

Lorenzo Adorni (born 1 December 1998) is an Italian footballer who plays as a right back for SSD Futura Fornovo Medesano.

== Club career ==
On 31 January 2019, Gubbio announced that he will join the club on loan. However, the league was not satisfied with the paperwork filed by Gubbio, and he had to return to Monza and finish the season there.

On 17 July 2019, he signed a 2-year contract with Vis Pesaro. On 31 January 2020, he moved to Imolese on loan until the end of the season. On 24 February 2021, his contract was terminated by mutual consent.

== Honours ==
=== Club ===
Monza

- Serie D: 2016-17
- Scudetto Dilettanti: 2016-17
