= Alinari =

Alinari is an Italian surname. Notable people with the surname include:

- Giuseppe, Leopoldo and Romualdo Alinari, Italian photographers
  - Fratelli Alinari, Italian photography company founded by Alinari brothers
- Luca Alinari (1943–2019), Italian painter
- Vittorio Alinari (1859–1932), Italian photographer, son of Leopoldo
