= Anna Maria Adorni Botti =

Italian religious sister (1805–1893)

Blessed Anna Maria Adorni Botti
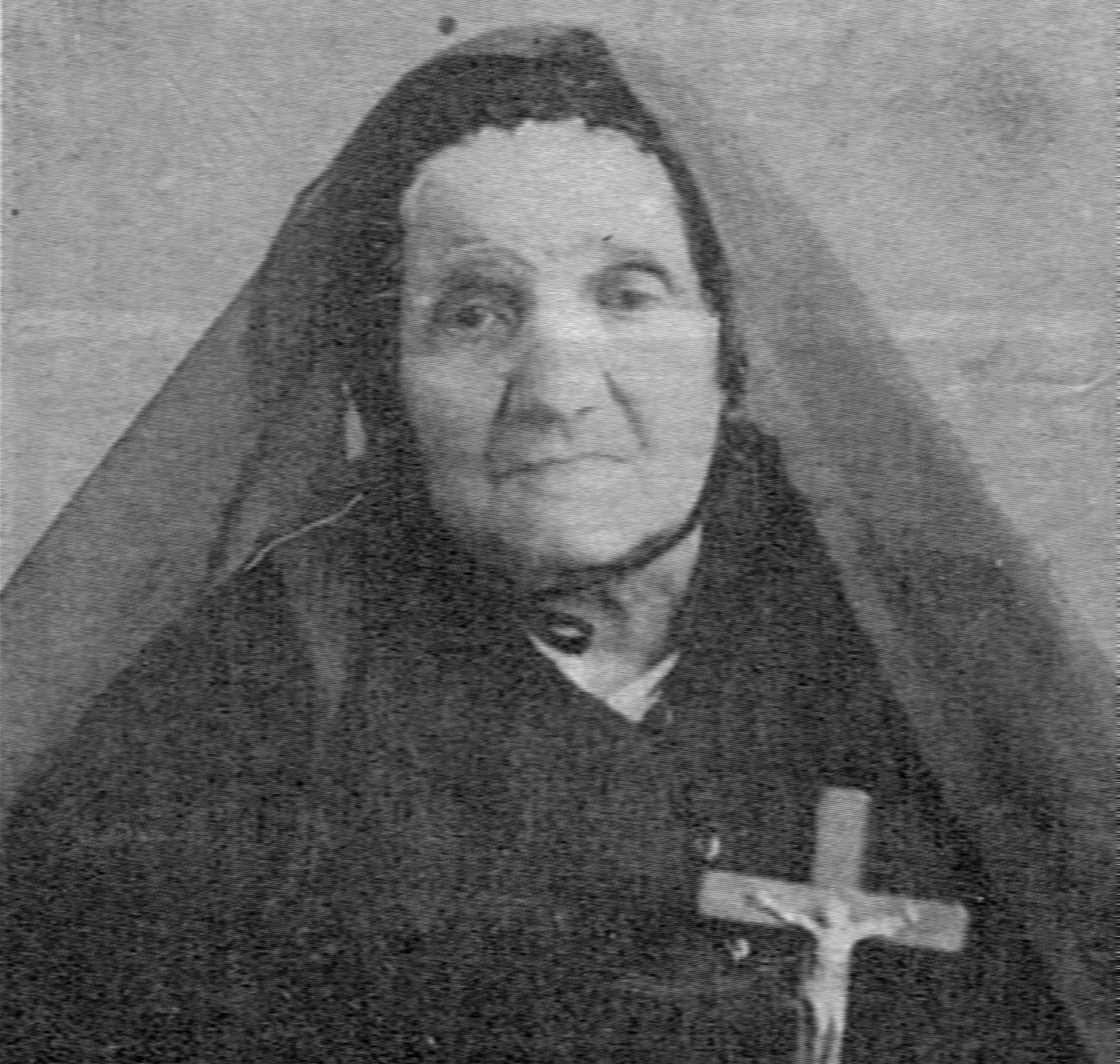
- Born: 19 June 1805; Fivizzano, Massa, Grand Duchy of Tuscany
- Died: 7 February 1893 (aged 87); Parma, Kingdom of Italy
- Venerated in: Roman Catholic Church
- Beatified: 3 October 2010, Parma Cathedral, Italy by Archbishop Angelo Amato
- Feast: 7 February

Anna Maria Adorni Botti (19 June 1805 – 7 February 1893), born Anna Maria Adorni, was an Italian religious sister of the Handmaids of the Immaculata, a congregation she established in 1857. Botti's vocation was to the religious life, and as a child believed she was destined for the missions and later as a Franciscan religious sister. After being widowed, she did pastoral work in Parma, where she established and ran the congregation of the Handmaids of the Immaculata until her death.

Botti was beatified on 3 October 2010 in the Parma Cathedral. Archbishop Angelo Amato presided over the beatification on behalf of Pope Benedict XVI who had approved the cause.

== Life ==
Anna Maria Adorni was born in Fivizzano on 19 June 1805 to Matteo Adorni and Antonia Zanetti; she was baptized the following 23 June. At the age of seven - in 1812 - left her home with a friend to join the missions but this never materialized as she was bought back home. However the religious calling within her blossomed, and she was resolved to live her life in the service of God.

At the age of fifteen in 1820 she lost her father and then moved with her mother to Parma; it was around this time that she wanted to become a Franciscan sister but respected the opposition of her mother who required Adorni's aid. On 18 October 1826 Adorni married Antonio Domenico Botti, and the couple had six children; five of those children died during their childhood and left a sole son, Leopoldo. The latter went on to become a Benedictine.

On 23 March 1844, her husband died and left her widowed. She began to visit prisoners and also educate street girls while roaming the streets of Parma and with a group of people who shared her ideals formed a union - known as the Institute of the Good Shepherd - that received the approval in 1847 of both the Bishop of Parma Giovanni Antonio Neuschel and the Duchess of Parma Maria Luigia; she rented an apartment for that union to use and then on 18 January 1856 made use of an old convent that the Augustinian nuns first ran. The role of that union was for its members to aid women in difficult times.

On 1 May 1857, she, alongside eight companions, established a new religious congregation. In 1859, Botti made her solemn vows. The congregation received formal approval in 1893. On 25 March 1876, the Bishop of Parma, Domenico Villa, granted formal approval to the establishment of the Institute of the Good Shepherd and her congregation as the Handmaids of the Immaculata. The rule was confirmed on 28 January 1893 after receiving the approval of Villa's successor, Andrea Miotti.

In 1892, Botti's health declined, and for a brief period confined to her bed. She died in 1893.

== Beatification ==
The beatification process commenced on 29 February 1940 in a diocesan process in the Diocese of Parma - the beginning of the process granted her the posthumous title of Servant of God - and saw the accumulation of her writings and a thorough investigation of her life and her work. The process concluded on 5 April 1943 in Parma, thus concluding the first process. The decree on her writings - to evaluate if her writings adhered to Church teachings but also to further investigate her life - was approved on 3 December 1944.

This process took place despite the fact that the Congregation of Rites - under Pope Pius XII - did not grant formal approval to the beatification cause until 11 January 1952. Following this a second process opened in Parma that spanned from 25 March 1953 until 10 March 1956; this process and the one prior were validated on 30 October 1959.

After an intensive investigation led in Rome she was proclaimed to be Venerable on 6 February 1978 after Pope Paul VI recognized the fact that she had lived a model Christian life of heroic virtue and exercised both the cardinal virtues and the theological virtues.

The miracle required for her beatification was investigated in the diocese of its origins in two separate processes: the first one spanned from 29 February 1940 and closed on 5 April 1943 - this occurred on a concurrent level to the first diocesan process. The second process of the healing was from 5 March 1953 until 10 March 1956, when the second diocesan process closed. It wasn't until several decades later, on 19 June 2006, that the Congregation for the Causes of Saints ratified those two processes and began their own investigation in Rome.

On 27 March 2010, her beatification was granted approval after Pope Benedict XVI determined that the healing was indeed a legitimate miracle. Archbishop Angelo Amato - on behalf of the pope - presided over the beatification on 3 October 2010 in the Parma Cathedral. The postulator assigned to the cause is Father Guglielmo Camera.
